= 2019 in Israel =

- Decades: 1990s; 2000s; 2010s; 2020s
- See also: History of Israel; Timeline of Israeli history; List of years in Israel

The following lists events in the year 2019 in Israel.

== Incumbents ==
- President – Reuven Rivlin
- Prime Minister – Benjamin Netanyahu
- President of the Supreme Court – Esther Hayut
- Chief of the General Staff – Aviv Kohavi
- Government of Israel – 34th government of Israel

== Events ==
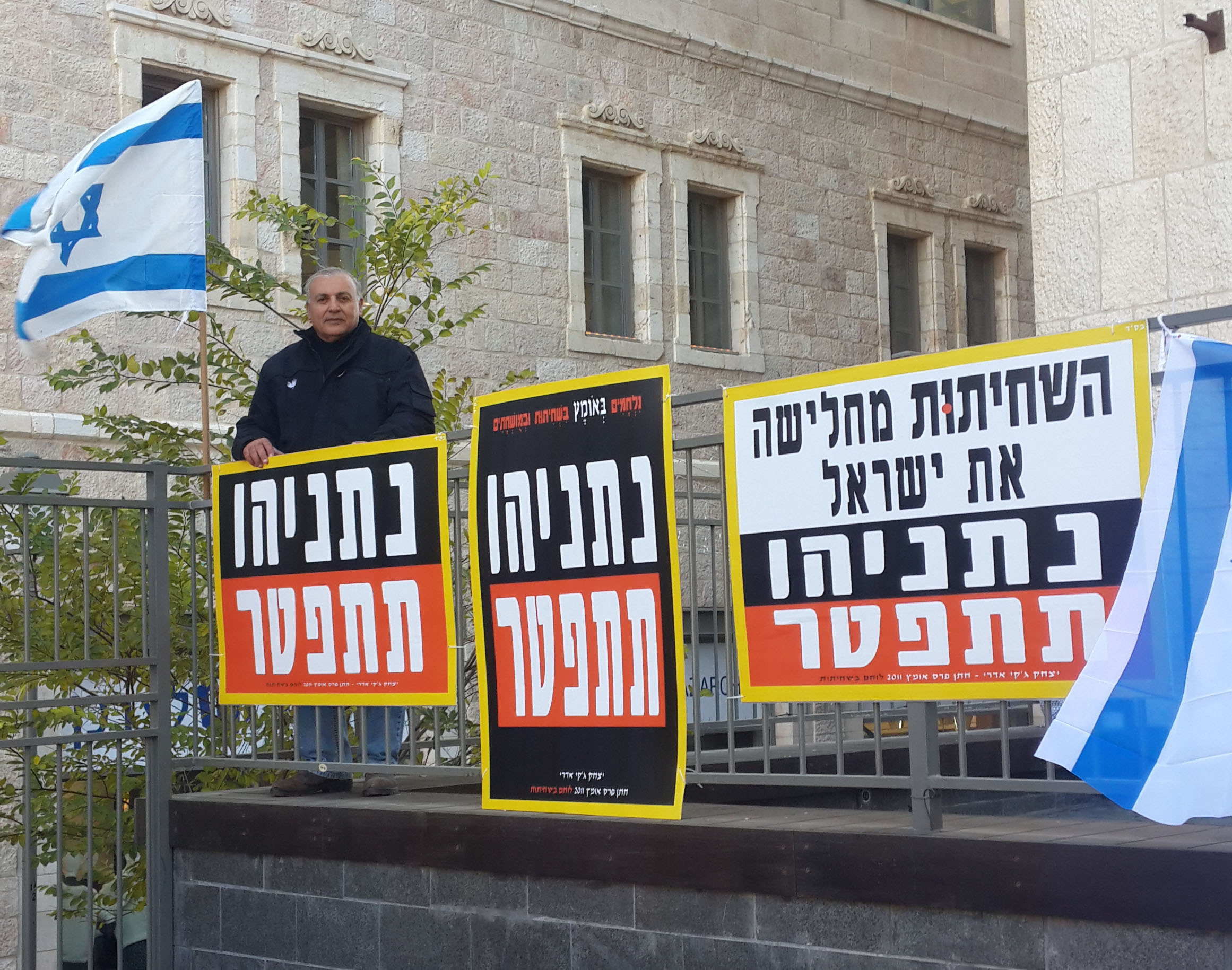
December: Protesters marched against Prime Minister Benjamin Netanyahu.

=== January ===
- January 9 – Former Israeli minister Gonen Segev pleads guilty to spying for Iran, in exchange for an 11-year prison sentence.
- January 24 – 2019 Judo Grand Prix Tel Aviv began

=== February ===
- February 13 – Venezuelan disputed interim President Juan Guaidó states that he is working to restore ties with Israel, which were broken by Hugo Chávez's anti-Israeli policy, while also weighing whether to relocate the nation's embassy into Jerusalem.
- February 17 – Israeli Prime Minister Benjamin Netanyahu appoints intelligence minister Israel Katz to take over the foreign minister portfolio. Netanyahu retains his defence minister and health minister roles. Israel's parliamentary elections are scheduled for 9 April 2019.
- February 18 – A summit between Israel and the Visegrád Group (the Czech Republic, Hungary, Poland and Slovakia) is cancelled following Poland's reaction and withdrawal as a result of Israeli officials' statements on the Holocaust alleging Polish involvement. Prime Minister Benjamin Netanyahu says Israel will hold bilateral talks with the three prime ministers attending.
- February 21 – Retired IDF Chief Benny Gantz and Yesh Atid chairman Yair Lapid agree to combine their prime ministerial campaigns in the April 9 Knesset election against incumbent Benjamin Netanyahu.
- February 26 – A Jewish Israeli teen is convicted of membership of a terror organisation, arson, and racially aggravated assault. He is the second Jewish person convicted of terror group membership ever in Israel in connection to crimes against Palestinians. His conviction was announced today, but occurred last week in secrecy.
- February 27 –
  - Israeli Prime Minister Benjamin Netanyahu tells Russian President Vladimir Putin that Israel will "continue to take action against Iran in Syria".
  - Ukraine withdraws from this year's Eurovision Song Contest in Tel Aviv, Israel, after Ukrainian entrant Maruv said she refused to be used as a "political tool" after being asked to sign a contract saying she wouldn't hold any concerts in Russia in the lead up to the event.
  - Shin Bet arrest lawyer Tarek Barghout, an attorney who has represented "terror" suspects, and a Palestinian man named Zakaria Zubeidi for what it calls "their involvement in serious and current terrorist activities."
- February 28 – The Attorney General of Israel Avichai Mandelblit says that after more than two years of investigations he has decided to indict Prime Minister Benjamin Netanyahu on charges of bribery, fraud and breach of trust.

=== March ===
- March 10 – Two Israelis killed in Addis Ababa-departed, en-route to Nairobi, Kenya Ethiopian Airlines Flight 302 crash in Bishoftu.
- March 11 – U.S. Senator Lindsey Graham visits the Israeli-occupied Golan Heights, saying he will start an effort to recognize the Golan as part of the State of Israel.
- March 14 – Two rockets are fired from the Gaza Strip at Tel Aviv, Israel; neither rocket was intercepted by the IDF's Iron Dome system.
- March 15 – 2019 Tel Aviv rocket strike
  - In response to a possible accidental launching of two rockets from the Gaza Strip towards Tel Aviv the day before, Israel launches hundreds of counter strikes directed at the town of Khan Yunis.
- March 22 –
  - U.S. President Donald Trump signs Proclamation on Recognizing the Golan Heights as Part of the State of Israel.
  - Syria has not publicly responded to President Trump's decision, with Ahmed Aboul Gheit, Secretary-General of the Arab League, declaring this action irrelevant and illegal.
- March 24 – In Washington, D.C., the leaders of Romania and Honduras announce they will recognize Jerusalem as Israel's capital, following the lead of the United States.
- March 25 –
  - Seven people are moderately injured after a rocket attack destroys a home in Mishmeret, Israel. The Israel Defense Forces claim that Hamas is responsible for any attack from Gaza.
  - As a result, Israeli Prime Minister Benjamin Netanyahu cuts his four-day trip to the United States short after meeting with U.S. President Donald Trump.
  - In retaliation Israeli Air Force jets strike multiple targets in the Gaza Strip, including the office of senior Hamas official Ismail Haniyeh, and Hamas' military intelligence headquarters in Gaza City.
  - U.S. President Donald Trump signs a proclamation formally recognising the disputed Golan Heights as sovereign Israeli territory.
  - Syria's Foreign Affairs Ministry condemns Trump's move as a "flagrant violation of the sovereignty of Syria".
- March 26 – A senior Hamas official claims that Iranian leaders ordered the March 25, 2019 rocket attack on Mishmeret, injuring seven Israelis, which was carried out by the IJMP and funded by Iran, claiming that the goal was to jeopardize Prime Minister Benjamin Netanyahu's chances of getting reelected in the April 9 elections.
- March 30 –
  - Israel Cleantech Ventures' Gro Intelligence reports that at least 400,000 hectares (1 million acres) of U.S. farmland were flooded from the early March blizzard storm that affected nine major grain-producing states.
  - Commemorating the one year anniversary of the Gaza border protests, tens of thousands of Palestinians gather on the border to commemorate the weekly gatherings, with Israeli Border Patrol killing four Palestinian protesters and injuring more than 300.
- March 31 – During the 30th Arab League summit held in Tunisia, leaders condemn the United States' claim that the Golan Heights belong to Israel, and stated the establishment of a Palestinian state is essential for stability.

=== April ===
- April 9 – April 2019 Israeli legislative election
- April 11 – Israeli spacecraft Beresheet crashes on the moon.

=== May ===
- 3–6 May – May 2019 Gaza–Israel clashes
- 14–18 May – The Eurovision Song Contest 2019 is held at the Expo Tel Aviv in Israel.
  - 18 May – Kobi Marimi represents Israel at the Eurovision Song Contest with the song "Home".

=== July ===
- 1 July - Israeli strikes on multiple Iranian and Syrian military targets outside Damascus and Homs, kills 16 and injures 21.
- 2–3 July – Following the fatal shooting of 18-year-old Solomon Teka, an Ethiopian–Israeli man by an Israeli police officer in Kiryat Haim, Haifa on June 30, Ethiopian Jews launch countrywide riots and clashes across Israel which results in more than 130 arrested and 111 police officers injured.
- 6 July - Five IDF soldiers are injured in a vehicle-ramming attack in Hizma, East Jerusalem, West Bank with the suspect currently at large.
- 17 July - At the request of Israel and the United States, Argentina officially declares Hezbollah a terrorist organization, freezing assets and expelling all members of the organization from the country. It also holds it responsible for the 1994 attack against AMIA.
- 19 July - Israeli drone strike on a base near Amirli, Iraq, belonging to the Iranian-backed Popular Mobilization Forces injuring two Iranians, with a second strike on a weapons depot destroyed several ballistic missiles. Iran confirmed on July 30 that the attack killed senior Islamic Revolutionary Guard Corps (IRGC) commander Abu Alfazl Sarabian.
- 27 July -
  - Israeli and Hezbollah exchange barrages of gunfire and artillery at the border of the Golan Heights, after a "security incident" with both claiming that the other crossed the border without confrontation, with two dozen explosions heard in Lebanon; with an Israeli shell smashing in a civilian home, narrowly missing a family in their residence without injury.
  - An Israeli airstrike on Iraq targets Camp Ashraf, suspected of stockpiling a consignment of ballistic missile launchers of IRGC officers and PMF personnel, with at least 40 killed. According to Iraqi and Iranian sources the attacks were carried out by Israeli F-35 aircraft.

=== August ===
- August 12- An Israeli airstrike on a PMF weapons depot in southern Baghdad killed one civilian and injured 29. A spokesman for Iraq's Interior Minister confirmed that the explosion was not caused by an internal failure. The Iraqi air control closed its airspace to all unauthorized flights on 13 August, including to the US coalition with Iraqi Prime Minister also ordering all military camps and munitions warehouses to be moved outside Iraqi cities.
- August 17 - Israeli airstrikes targeted the 30th Brigade's headquarters, which is affiliated with the Popular Mobilization Force].
- August 20 - An Israeli airstrike on a PMF arms depot on 20 August close to the Balad Air Base. A PMF source said the arms depot was specifically targeted by an aerial bombardment.
- August 25
  - Two Israeli drones crash in Dahieh, Beirut, Lebanon, with one crashing into the roof of the Hezbollah Media Center, with the second one exploding 45 minutes later and also damaging the building. It is the first such incident between Israel and Lebanon since the 2006 Lebanon War.
  - Two Israeli drone strikes on a PMF convoy near the Syrian–Iraqi border town of Al-Qa'im, kills six, including a senior commander, occurs as Hezbollah leader Hassan Nasrallah was delivering a speech in response to the alleged Israeli attack on their Dahieh stronghold.
- 26 August
  - Israeli drones attack a Popular Front for the Liberation of Palestine (PFLP) position in Qousaya, Lebanon.

=== September ===
- September 10 -
  - 10 September, Israeli airstrike targets a warehouse suspected to be used by Popular Mobilization Forces near the city of Hit in Al Anbar Governorate, northwest of Baghdad. As result of the explosions, 21 Iraqi militants of the Popular Mobilization Forces were killed. Prime Minister of Israel Benjamin Netanyahu proposes to annex parts of the West Bank and the Jordan Valley. Prime Minister of the State of Palestine Mohammad Shtayyeh replies that "Netanyahu is the chief destroyer of the peace process".
- September 12 – Facebook suspends a chatbot on Israeli Prime Minister Benjamin Netanyahu's official page for violating its hate speech policy. Netanyahu says the mistake was made by a volunteer employee.
- September 15 –
  - The Cabinet of Israel legalizes the outpost settlement of Mevo’ot Yericho, in the occupied West Bank.
  - Turkish Foreign Minister Mevlüt Çavuşoğlu, referring to Israeli Prime Minister Benjamin Netanyahu's proposed annexation of the West Bank announces Israel is turning into "a racist, apartheid regime."
- September 17 – Israeli voters head to the polls after the last election failed to form a government, with exit polls showing the incumbent right-wing Likud are barely losing to the centrist Blue and White alliance.
- September 22 –
  - An Israeli drone strike targets an Iraqi base near Syria suspected to be of the "Liwa al-Tafuf" 13th Brigade of the Popular Mobilisation Units.
  - The Joint List recommends Benny Gantz as the next Prime Minister of Israel. This is the first time an Arab-led political party recommends a candidate for prime minister since they recommended Yitzhak Rabin in 1992.
- September 25 – Israeli President Reuven Rivlin formally gives Benjamin Netanyahu the mandate to form the next Israeli government by October 24, after 55 members of the Knesset recommended the latter, compared with 54 recommendations for Benny Gantz, giving the ultimatum that if Netanyahu fails, the mandate could be transferred to Gantz.

=== October ===
- October 2 - Israeli Prime Minister Benjamin Netanyahu faces a pretrial hearing regarding the charges against him in Case 4000, one of the three corruption cases in which the Israeli Attorney General Avichai Mandelblit decided to indict him, pending a hearing.
- October 23 - President of Israel Reuven Rivlin tasks Leader of the Opposition Benny Gantz to try to form government after the failing of current Prime Minister Benjamin Netanyahu.
- October 29 -
  - Jordan recalls its ambassador to Israel when the latter refuses to release two Jordanian citizens whom Foreign Affairs Minister Ayman Safadi says have been held illegally for months without charges. They were arrested in August for crossing into the West Bank to attend a family wedding.
  - WhatsApp sues Israeli cyber intelligence firm NSO Group for allegedly spying on 1,400 users on four continents. Among those affected were diplomats, journalists, and government officials. If moved forward, it could set a major legal precedent for cybersecurity.
- October 31 - A rocket is fired from the Gaza Strip, exploding in an open field in southern Israel. The IDF retaliates by launching strikes against two Hamas military posts.

=== November ===
- November 6 – Israel releases two Jordanian citizens it held in detention since August, after the Jordanian government successfully negotiated for their release on Monday.
- November 10 – Israel returns the territory of the "Island of Peace" to Jordan.
- November 11 –
  - Israel Defense Forces announces the assassination of PIJ's Al-Quds Brigades, Baha Abu al-Ata leader, in an airstrike on a building in the Gaza Strip. PIJ confirms the death of Baha Abu al-Ata and his wife, vowing to "shake the Zionist entity to its core" in response.
  - Israeli Air Force strikes a downtown Damascus residence believed to be of a PIJ militant, killing one of the militant's son.
- 12 November – Israeli airstrikes on Gaza kills seven including PIJ commander Bahaa Abu el-Atta and injures 45 with 19 Israelis injured in retaliatory rocket attacks.
- 13 November – Israeli airstrikes kills 22 in Gaza including 20 militants, an Islamic Jihad rocket commander and five relatives and injures dozens in Gaza followed by more than 200 rockets fired from Gaza.
- 14 November – IDF Arabic-language spokesperson Avichay Adraee claims that an Israeli airstrike has killed PIJ commander Rasmi Abu Malhous and nine family members but the commander is claimed to be nonexistent.
- 12–14 November – 39 are killed and 111 are injured in clashes of the Al-Quds Brigades of the Palestinian Islamic Jihad with Israeli forces in Gaza.
- 16 November – Israeli airstrikes are launched on Gaza after continued rocket attack barrages.
- November 21 – Israeli Prime Minister Benjamin Netanyahu is indicted on charges of bribery, fraud and breach of trust.
- 18 November – The Trump administration announces that the U.S. no longer considers Israeli settlement of the West Bank as illegal per se under international law. The announcement is praised by Israeli Prime Minister Benjamin Netanyahu, and condemned by the European Union, the Palestinian National Authority, and Jordanian Foreign Affairs Minister Ayman Safadi.
- 20 November -
  - Israeli airstrikes of Syria targets dozens of Quds Force targets in Damascus and surrounding towns in response to a missile intercepted the previous day over the Golan Heights. The Syrian Observatory for Human Rights reports 23 are killed, including several Iranian fighters.
  - Blue and White Alliance leader Benny Gantz's mandate to form a new government expires. As both he and Prime Minister Benjamin Netanyahu failed to form one, Israel will likely face a third election in two years.
- 21 November - Prime Minister of Israel Benjamin Netanyahu is officially indicted by Attorney General Avichai Mandelblit for bribery, fraud, and breach of trust. Netanyahu protests the allegations as being part of a political "witch-hunt" against him.
- 23 November - Iranian Vice President Eshaq Jahangiri warns regional states of dire consequences, claiming the protests are "directly linked to the United States, Saudi Arabia, and Israel."
- 25 November - Hossein Salami, commander-in-chief of the Revolutionary Guards delivers a televised speech toward Israel, Saudi Arabia, the United States and those who are protesting against the government in which he says "We will destroy you" if they cross Iran's red line.
- 26 November - Ayoob Kara, former Minister of Communications announces that in a U.S.-backed peace plan, Israeli citizens will be allowed to visit the Gulf States for "business and political purposes", starting next year.
- 28 November - Israel reestablish diplomatic relations with Bolivia after ties were suspended over a decade ago as a consequence of Operation Cast Lead. Bolivian transitional government Foreign minister announces President Evo Morales took the decision in 2009 "without thinking about the economic and commercial consequences".

=== December ===
- 4 December - An Israeli airstrike targets an IRGC weapons depot in Abu Kamal District, Deir ez-Zor Governorate, Syria, with the U.S. denying any involvement.
- 12 December – The Israeli parliament votes to dissolve itself and schedules an unprecedented third election in a year for 2 March 2020, which is unprecedented in Israel's history due to the apparent inability of any of the major parties to be able to form a governing coalition that would be decisive under the laws of Israel's parliamentary system.
- 20 December – International Criminal Court investigation in Palestine announced by ICC chief prosecutor Fatou Bensouda to investigate alleged breaches by both sides in the Israeli–Palestinian conflict.
- 23 December – The UK-based SOHR determines that an Israeli missile attack near Damascus killed three Iranians.
- 25 December – Israeli Prime Minister Benjamin Netanyahu is briefly brought to a bomb shelter during an election rally in Ashkelon, after a rocket is fired from Gaza Strip with no casualties reported.
- 26 December – Israeli Prime Minister Benjamin Netanyahu survives a primary challenge from former Education Minister Gideon Sa'ar with 72% of the vote.
- 31 December – Israel started extraction from the Leviathan gas field.

== Deaths ==
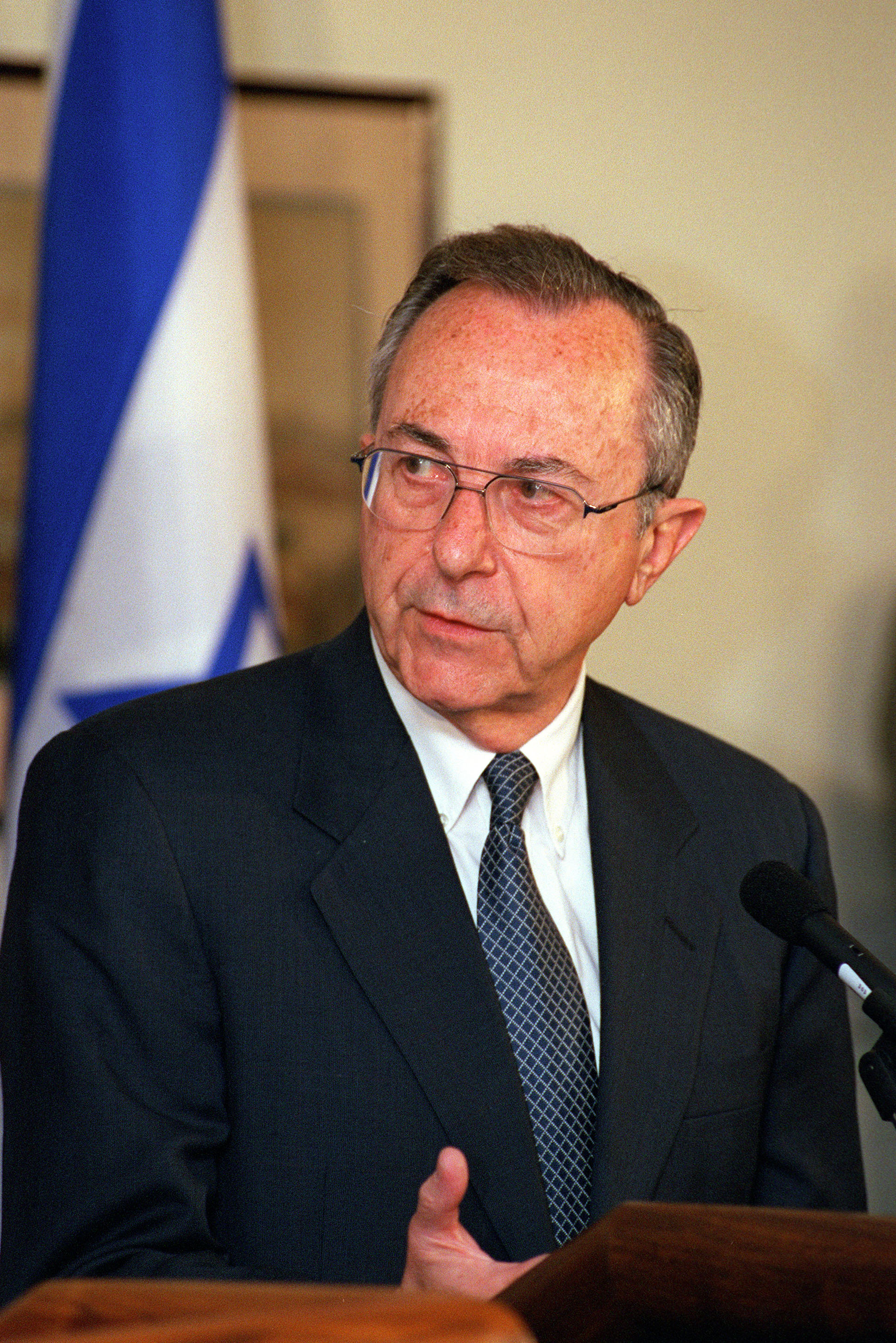
Moshe Arens

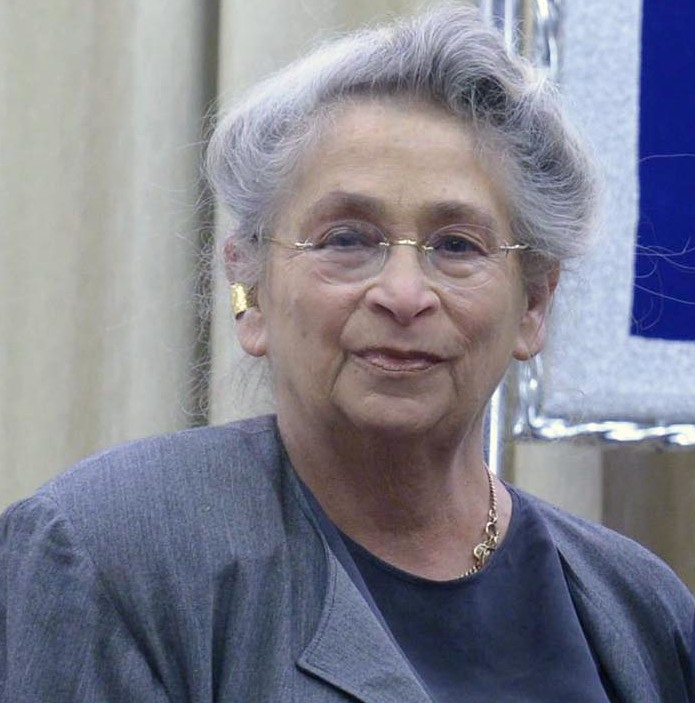
Nechama Rivlin

- 7 January – Moshe Arens (b. 1925), aeronautical engineer, diplomat and politician.
- 25 January – Meshulam Riklis (b.1923), Turkish-born Israeli businessman.
- 1 February – Yosef Sorinov (b. 1946), footballer.
- 6 February – Yechiel Eckstein (b. 1951), Israeli-American rabbi.
- 14 February – Michael Nudelman (b. 1938), politician.
- 17 February – Ami Maayani (b. 1936), composer.
- 26 February – Yizhak Sadai (b. 1935), composer.
- 11 March – Yona Atari (b. 1933), singer and actress.
- 11 March – Danny Ben-Israel (b. 1944), musician.
- 23 March – Rafi Eitan (b. 1926), spy and politician.
- 2 May – Micha Lindenstrauss (b. 1937), judge and State Comptroller.
- 4 June – Nechama Rivlin (b. 1945), First Lady of Israel (2014-2019).
- 7 July – Ora Namir (b. 1930), politician and diplomat.
- 18 October – Meir Shamgar (b. 1925), jurist and former Chief Justice of the Supreme Court.
- 8 December – Herbert Pundik (b. 1927), Danish-Israeli journalist and author.
- 18 December – Geulah Cohen (b. 1925), politician and activist.

== See also ==
- 2018–2022 Israeli political crisis
- Timeline of the Israeli–Palestinian conflict in 2019
