= May 2019 Gaza–Israel clashes =

Events in the Gaza-Israel conflict

Gaza–Israel clashes (May 2019)
- Part of the Gaza–Israel conflict
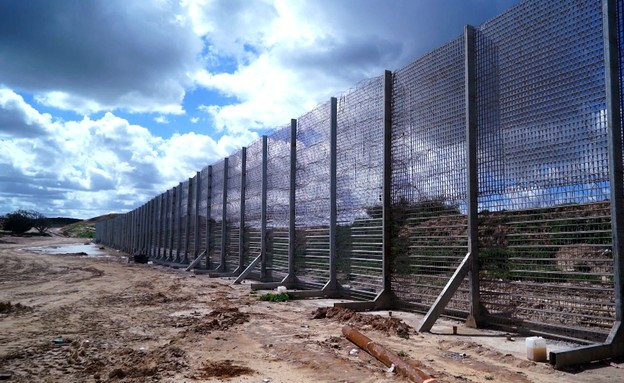
- Picture of the Gaza–Israel barrier
Date	3–6 May 2019 (3 days)
Location	Israel–Gaza barrier
Result	War avoided, status quo maintained

Belligerents
Gaza Strip: Hamas; Palestinian Islamic Jihad; National Resistance Brigades	Israel

Commanders and leaders
Yahya Sinwar; Hamed Ahmed Abed Khudri †	(Israel) Benjamin Netanyahu

Units involved
Izz ad-Din al-Qassam Brigades; Al-Nasser Salah al-Deen Brigades	Israel Defense Forces: Israel Air Force

Casualties and losses
Per Palestinians: 25 killed (~10 militants), 154 wounded Per ITIC: 23 killed (17 militants)	4 civilians killed, 123 civilians wounded, 2 soldiers wounded

A Gaza–Israel conflict escalation began on 3 May 2019 after two Israeli soldiers were injured by sniper fire from the Gaza Strip during the weekly protests at the Gaza–Israel border. In response, the Israeli Air Force carried out an airstrike, killing two Palestinians. Following this, hundreds of rockets were launched from Gaza at Israel, while the Israeli Air Force struck numerous targets within the Gaza Strip. In addition, Israel increased its troop presence near the Israel–Gaza barrier.

A ceasefire facilitated by Egyptian mediators went into effect on 6 May.

== Exchanges of fire ==
=== Friday, 3 May ===
On 3 May, during the weekly protests at the Gaza–Israel border, two Israeli soldiers were injured in an attack by a Gazan sniper who, according to Israel Defense Forces (IDF), was connected to Palestinian Islamic Jihad (PIJ). In response, the Israel Air Force targeted a nearby Hamas post with an airstrike, killing two people and injuring two others. The men killed were identified as Abdullah Ibrahim Mahmoud Abu Salouh, 33 and Alaa Ali Hasan al-Boubli, 29. Hamas pledged to respond to the "Israeli aggression". In addition, two other Palestinians were killed and 60 wounded, 36 of them by Israeli gunfire.

=== Saturday, 4 May ===
According to IDF, more than 250 rockets were launched from Gaza into Israel, causing serious injury to at least one person.

The Israeli Air Force and IDF struck more than 120 sites in the Gaza Strip. According to the Health Ministry of the Gaza Strip, these airstrikes killed four people – two men, and a woman with a toddler. According to Palestinian officials, the woman and toddler who died were identified as Falestine Abu Arar, 37, and her niece Siba Abu Arar, 14-months old. Thirteen other Palestinians were reportedly injured during the day. The IDF denied responsibility, stating that the woman and toddler were killed by Palestinian rocket fire. Al-Risala News run by Hamas also denied the claims against the IDF, saying that the PIJ was responsible for the deaths.

=== Sunday, 5 May ===
At least 200 more projectiles were launched from Gaza towards Israel, killing four people and injuring several others. An Israeli man was killed when a rocket struck in front of his home. The man was identified as Moshe Agadi, a 58-year-old father of four. A rocket fired overnight damaged an empty kindergarten in Sderot, after landing in its yard and exploding. Later that day, a rocket directly struck a factory in the city of Ashkelon, leaving a man dead and two others injured. A Kornet anti-tank missile hit a private van in the kibbutz community of Yad Mordechai, killing the Israeli driver. Three people were injured in the Eshkol Regional Council – two lightly when a mortar shell landed in a yard, and a Thai worker was moderately wounded by a rocket that exploded in a field where he was working. A 35-year-old man was killed by shrapnel from a rocket that hit his Ashdod home later that day.

In response, the IDF struck over 210 sites in the Gaza Strip during the day. A Hamas commander was killed by an airstrike during the day while travelling in a car down a street, marking the first targeted killing carried out by Israel in several years. The man was identified as Hamed Ahmed Abed Khudri, and was accused of transferring funds from Iran to Gaza. Palestinian factions threatened to use long-range rockets to attack Israel if the "aggression" continues. During the day, Israel deployed the 7th Armored Brigade and the Golani Brigade to the Gaza–Israel border. Later that day, an Israeli airstrike killed 3 people in the northern Gaza town of Beit Lahiya, including a pregnant woman, according to the Health Ministry of the Gaza Strip. The woman was identified as 33-year old Amani al-Madhoun.

=== Monday, 6 May ===
In the early morning of 6 May, a ceasefire agreement mediated by Egypt in its capital city Cairo was reached, taking effect at 4:30 A.M (1:30 UTC). At 7:00 A.M., Israel announced all restrictions for residents of the south were lifted, and schools opened normally.

== International response ==
EU High Representative Federica Mogherini called for armed Palestinians in the Gaza Strip to end rocket shootings towards Israeli territory, holding that attacks lead to suffering on both sides, and that the EU seeks security and stability in the region. She also backed Egypt in its pertinent role in the ceasefire mediation effort. U.S. President Donald Trump backed Israel's right to self-defense. He called on the Gazan people to "end the violence".

== See also ==
- 2019 in Israel
- 2019 Tel Aviv rocket strike
- Gaza–Israel clashes (November 2018)
- List of battles since 2001
- Military operations of the Israeli–Palestinian conflict
