= Gaza–Israel conflict =

Part of the Israeli–Palestinian conflict

- Part of the Israeli–Palestinian conflict and the Arab–Israeli conflict
- Map of the Gaza Strip
Date	15 May 1948 – present (78 years, 6 months and 4 days)
Location	Gaza Strip and Israel
Status	Ongoing
Territorial changes	Egypt captures the Gaza Strip in 1948; Palestinian fedayeen fighters from 1948–1956 conduct cross-border raids into Israel; Israel occupies the Gaza Strip during the Suez Crisis in 1956 but subsequently withdraws following intense US pressure; Israel reoccupies the Gaza Strip in 1967 during the Six-Day War; The Second Intifada lasts from 2000 to 2005; Israel disengages from the Gaza Strip in 2005; Israel implements the ongoing Gaza blockade after Hamas seizes control in 2007; Many wars occur in the Gaza Strip since 2007 with the most recent war ongoing since 2023

Belligerents
All-Palestine Protectorate (Note: (1948–1959)); Palestinian fedayeen; (Palestine) Palestinian Authority (Note: (1994–2007)) (Palestine) Hamas-ruled Gaza Strip (Note: (2007–present)); Gazan Salafi-jihadist groups (Note: (2009–present))	Israel Israeli-backed groups: Popular Forces (Note: From May 2024. Popular Forces have been described as a Salafi Jihadist organization with alleged ties to the Islamic State. Several senior leaders in the Popular Forces also allied with the Islamic State in the Sinai.); Popular Army – Northern Forces; Fatah-affiliated groups; Counter-Terrorism Strike Force; Shuja'iyya Popular Defense Forces; Khanidak clan (disputed); Al-Mujaida clan (disputed)

Casualties and losses
56,000–80,000+ killed	1,944+ killed

The Gaza–Israel conflict is a localized part of the Israeli–Palestinian conflict beginning in 1948, when about 200,000 of the more than 700,000 Palestinians who fled or were expelled from their homes settled in the Gaza Strip as refugees. Since then, Israel and Palestinian militant groups have fought 15 wars in the Gaza Strip. The number of Palestinians killed in the Gaza war (ongoing since 2023) (73,000+) is higher than the combined death toll of all other wars in the Israeli–Palestinian conflict.

Israel fought three wars in the Egyptian-administered Gaza Strip: the 1948 Palestine war, the Suez Crisis during which Israel first occupied Gaza for a period of four months, and the Six-Day War in 1967 during which Israel captured Gaza from Egypt. During the first Israeli occupation, 1% of the Gaza Strip's population was killed, tortured, or imprisoned by Israel. Following two periods of low-level Palestinian insurgency, a major uprising against Israeli rule erupted in 1987, starting a period of unrest known as the First Intifada. The 1993 Oslo Accords brought a period of relative calm which was nevertheless disrupted by various events, including Israeli settler violence, suicide attacks by Palestinian militant groups, the Cave of the Patriarchs massacre, and the assassination of Yitzhak Rabin.

In 2000, the Second Intifada began. In 2005, towards the end of the Second Intifada, Israel disengaged from Gaza. Shortly thereafter, Hamas won the 2006 election in Gaza and seized control of the Strip in 2007. That same year, Israel imposed a land, air and sea blockade of the Gaza Strip, turning it into an "open-air prison". The blockade was widely condemned as a form of collective punishment, while Israel defended it as necessary to stop Palestinian rocket attacks. Hamas considered it a declaration of war.

The 2008–2009 Israeli invasion of Gaza resulted in more than 1,000 deaths and widespread destruction of homes, schools and hospitals. A 2012 Israeli operation also killed more than 100 people. In 2014, Israel invaded Gaza in a major war that resulted in the deaths of 73 Israelis (mostly soldiers) and 2,251 Palestinians (mostly civilians). The invasion resulted in "unprecedented" destruction, damaging 25% of homes in Gaza City and 70% of homes in Beit Hanoun. After 2014, notable events in the conflict included the "Great March of Return" (2018–2019) and clashes in November 2018, May 2019 and November 2019. The 2021 crisis saw 256 Palestinians and 15 Israelis killed.

On 7 October 2023, Palestinian militants attacked Israel, killing 1,195 people (mostly civilians), committing war crimes, taking hostages, and beginning the Gaza war. Israel responded by invading and bombing the Gaza Strip, killing more than 73,000 Gazans as of September 2026 and causing a humanitarian crisis and famine. Many scholarly sources and international organizations have concluded that Israel's actions in Gaza constitute genocide.

== Background ==
The Green Line of the 1949 Armistice Agreements that formally ended the 1948 Palestine war formally established the territories of the Gaza Strip and the State of Israel in what had been Mandatory Palestine at the start of the war.

Israel and Gaza have fought six wars since their establishment.

== Military engagements ==
=== 1948 Palestine War ===
In Operation Barak, part of Plan Dalet, the Zionist offensive in the civil war phase aiming to capture territory in advance of the establishment of the State of Israel, the Givati Brigade of the Haganah attacked, depopulated, and demolished Arab villages north of Gaza.

On 22 December, large IDF forces started Operation Horev. Its objective was to encircle the Egyptian Army in the Gaza Strip and force the Egyptians to end the war. The operation was a decisive Israeli victory, and Israeli raids into the Nitzana area and the Sinai Peninsula forced the Egyptian army into the Gaza Strip, where it was surrounded. Israeli forces withdrew from Sinai and Gaza under international pressure and after the British threatened to intervene against Israel.

The Green Line established in the 1949 Armistice Agreements at the end of the war, which delineated the boundaries of the Gaza Strip, corresponded to the military front of the 1948 war. The All-Palestine Protectorate (September 1948 – 1959) was established in the territory under the control of the Kingdom of Egypt and, after the Egyptian revolution of 1952, the Republic of Egypt.

=== Suez Crisis ===
Israel occupied the Gaza Strip for four months during the Suez Crisis in 1956. During this occupation, 930–1,200 Palestinians were killed, most notably in the Khan Younis massacre and Rafah massacre. In total, about 1% of the population of the Gaza Strip was either killed, wounded, tortured or imprisoned by Israel. In 1957, Israel withdrew from the Gaza Strip after American pressure.

=== 1967 war ===
In the 1967 war, Israel occupied Gaza Strip, along with Sinai, Golan Heights and the West Bank. During the war, and shortly after, between 40,000 and 45,000 civilians fled or were expelled from the Gaza Strip. Many Palestinian civilians were killed as they fled. On 11 June, a grenade killed 8 Gaza civilians and a shooting killed another 10.

After the 1967 war, several Israeli leaders argued against turning the Armistice Demarcation Lines into permanent borders on the grounds of Israeli security:

- Prime Minister Golda Meir said the pre-1967 borders were so dangerous that it "would be treasonable" for an Israeli leader to accept them (The New York Times, December 23, 1969).
- The Foreign Minister Abba Eban said the pre-1967 borders have "a memory of Auschwitz" (Der Spiegel, November 5, 1969).
- Prime Minister Menachem Begin described a proposal for a retreat to the pre-1967 borders as "national suicide for Israel."

=== First Intifada ===
During the First Intifada, in the Gaza Strip alone, 142 Palestinians were killed, while no Israelis died: 77 were shot dead, and 37 died from tear-gas inhalation. Seventeen died from beatings at the hand of Israeli police or soldiers.

==== Israel–Gaza barrier ====
Israel completed the initial Gaza–Israel barrier in 1996. It has helped reduce infiltration from Gaza Strip into Israel. Special permits to enter Israel for medical purposes were also greatly reduced, which has made travel for Palestinians difficult.

Daniel Schueftan, in his 1999 book, Disengagement: Israel and the Palestinian Entity ("The Need for Separation: Israel and the Palestinian Authority"), reviews new and existing arguments underlying different separation stances, in order to make the case for separation from the Palestinians, beginning with those in the West Bank and Gaza. Schueftan favors the "hard separation" stances of politicians like Yitzhak Rabin and Ehud Barak.

Yitzhak Rabin was the first to propose the creation of a physical barrier between the Israeli and Palestinian populations in 1992, and by 1994, construction on the first barrier—the Israel–Gaza barrier—had begun; it is actually a wire fence equipped with sensors. Following an attack on Bet Lid, near the city of Netanya, Rabin specified the objectives behind the undertaking, stating that:

This path must lead to a separation, though not according to the borders prior to 1967. We want to reach a separation between us and them. We do not want the majority of the Jewish residents of the state of Israel, 98% of whom live within the borders of sovereign Israel, including a united Jerusalem, to be subject to terrorism."

=== Second Intifada ===
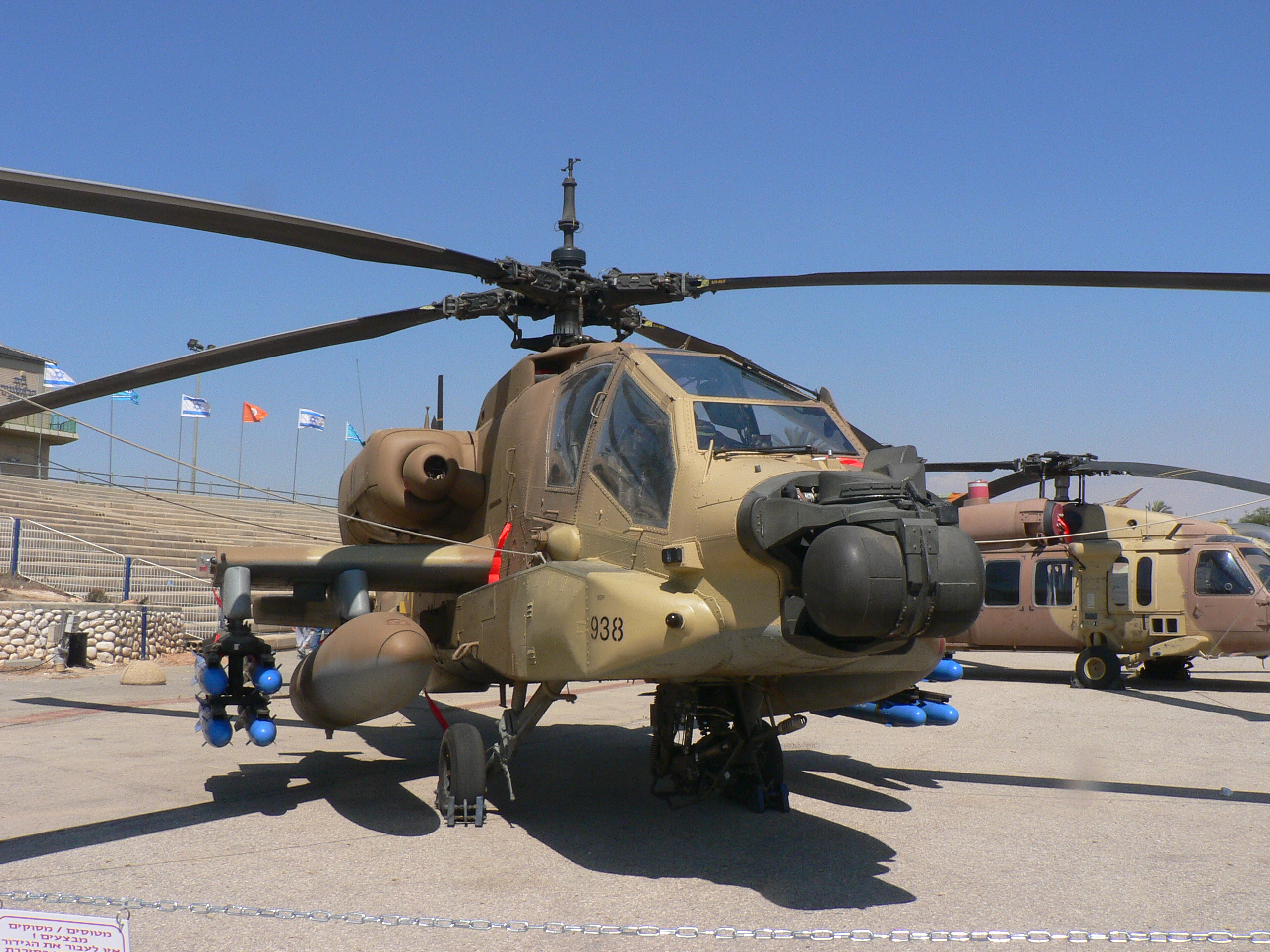
The Israeli Air Force (IAF) AH-64 Apache were used as platform for shooting guided missiles at Palestinian targets and employed at the targeted killings policy against both militants and political leaders.

The Second Intifada, also known as the al-Aqsa Intifada, began in September 2000. Many Palestinians considered the Intifada to be a struggle of national liberation against Israeli occupation imposed on them following the 1967 War, whereas many Israelis considered it to be a terrorist campaign.

Palestinian tactics ranged from carrying out mass protests and general strikes, as in the First Intifada, to mounting suicide bombing attacks and firing Qassam rockets into southeastern Israeli residential areas. Israeli tactics ranged from conducting mass arrests and locking up Palestinians in administrative detention to setting up checkpoints and building the Israeli Gaza Strip barrier and West Bank barrier to carrying out assassinations targeting militants and leaders of Palestinian organizations.

After the 2006 Palestinian legislative election, Israel negotiated with Mahmoud Abbas and the PLO, but simultaneously targeted and bombed Hamas activists and militants and arrested Hamas's elected legislative council politicians.

The death toll, both military and civilian, over the entire period in question (2000–2007) is estimated to be over 4,300 Palestinians and over 1,000 Israelis; 64 foreign citizens were also killed (54 by Palestinians, and 10 by Israeli security forces).

==== Israel's unilateral disengagement ====
Israel implemented its Disengagement Plan in August–September 2005, withdrawing its civilian and military presence from the Gaza Strip, and retaining control over the Gaza airspace, maritime access and borders even with Egypt according to the 2005 agreement with the Palestinian authority. Qassam rockets were fired regularly prior to the Israeli disengagement and the frequency of Qassam attacks increased after the Disengagement from Gaza. Palestinian militants have targeted a number of military bases and civilian towns in Southern Israel.

Since 2001, Palestinian militants have launched thousands of rocket and mortar attacks on Israel from the Gaza Strip, killing, injuring and traumatizing Israeli civilians.

In July 2006, Israel briefly re-occupied parts of northern Gaza Strip and used the occupied areas as bases for raids into Jabalya and Beit Lahya. Hamas responded by launching rockets.

==== Ascendancy of Hamas ====
When the Islamic party Hamas won the January 2006 Palestinian legislative election, gaining a majority of seats in the Palestinian Legislative Council, the conflict between Israel and Gaza intensified. Israel sealed its border with the Gaza Strip, largely preventing the free flow of people and many imports and exports. Palestinians shot Qassam rockets at Israeli settlements located near the Gaza borders, and staged cross-border raids aimed at killing or capturing Israeli soldiers. In one such raid, on 25 June 2006, Palestinians captured Israeli soldier Gilad Shalit, leading to massive retaliation by the Israeli army which included air strikes against Hamas targets.

In June 2007, internal fighting broke out between Hamas and Fatah, and Hamas fully consolidated its power by staging an armed coup d'état and taking control of the Gaza Strip. Following the internecine fighting that occurred between 7 and 15 June 2007, also known as the Battle of Gaza in which 118 Palestinians were killed and over 550 were wounded, the entire Gaza Strip came under full control of a Hamas government.

As a response to the Hamas takeover, Israel sharply restricted the flow of people and goods into and out of Gaza. About 70% of Gaza's workforce became unemployed or without pay, and about 80% of its residents lived in poverty.

Since Hamas' takeover, Palestinian armed groups in Gaza and Israel continued to clash. Palestinian armed groups fired rockets into Israel, killing Israeli civilians, including children, and wounding others, as well as causing damage to infrastructure; and Israel launched attacks and shelled Gaza with artillery, killing Palestinian combatants as well as civilians, including children, and causing devastating damage to infrastructure. According to Human Rights Watch, the Palestinian deliberate attacks against civilians violated international humanitarian law. Because Hamas exercised power inside Gaza, it was responsible for stopping unlawful attacks even when carried out by other groups.

=== 2006–2007 ===
Large-scale conventional warfare beyond the peripheries of the Gaza Strip began when Palestinian militants abducted Corporal Gilad Shalit, and Israel responded by launching Operation "Summer Rains" on 28 June 2006. The operation became the first major mobilization within the Gaza Strip since Israel unilaterally disengaged from the region between August and September 2005.

The Gaza beach blast was an event on 9 June 2006 in which eight Palestinians were killed—including nearly the entire family of seven-year-old Huda Ghaliya—and at least thirty others were injured in an explosion on a beach near the municipality of Beit Lahia in the Gaza Strip. The incident received considerable attention from news media worldwide, with blame for the explosion hotly disputed in the following weeks.

Israel maintains that it mobilized thousands of troops in order to suppress Qassam rocket fire against its civilian population and to secure the release of Gilad Shalit. It is estimated that between 7,000 and 9,000 Israeli artillery shells were fired into Gaza between September 2005 and June 2006, killing 80 Palestinians in 6 months. On the Palestinian side, over 1,300 Qassam rockets have been fired into Israel from September 2000 to 21 December 2006. Israeli forces also continued to search for tunnels, used by militants to smuggle weapons, as well as monitor operations at checkpoints (with some assistance from the European Union at Rafah) for security reasons, specifically possible weapons transfers and uninhibited return of exiled extremist leaders and terrorists. As of 18 October 2006, Israel has discovered 20 tunnels used for illegal arms smuggling under the border of the Gaza Strip and Egypt.

Israel had said it would withdraw from the Strip and end the operation as soon as Shalit was released. The Palestinians had said that they were willing to return Shalit in exchange for the release of some of the Palestinians held in Israeli jails. The Palestinians and others have also said the assault was aimed at toppling the democratically elected Hamas-led government and at destabilizing the Palestinian National Authority, citing the targeting of civilian infrastructure such as a power station and the captures of government and parliament members. Some 300 Palestinians had been targeted by the IDF in the Gaza Strip since the kidnapping of Corporal Gilad Shalit.

In July 2006, first reports emerged about mystery injuries after Israeli attacks. Previously unseen injuries included severely damaged internal organs, severe internal burning and deep internal wounds often resulting in amputations or death. Bodies arrived severely fragmented, melted and disfigured. There were speculations about a new experimental weapon, particularly Dense inert metal explosives (DIMEs).

Attempting to curb Qassam rocket attacks fired at Southern Israel by Palestinian militants from the northern Gaza Strip, Israel launched Operation "Autumn Clouds" on 1 November 2006.

On 8 November 2006, a day after Israel's withdrawal following Operation "Autumn Clouds", Israel Defense Forces shells missed their target—possibly due to a "technical malfunction"—and hit a row of houses in the Gaza Strip town of Beit Hanoun, killing 19 Palestinians and wounding more than 40. Israeli Defense Forces launched an investigation into the Beit Hanoun November 2006 incident (and later apologized for the incident), and the then-Israeli President Ehud Olmert offered humanitarian assistance to those affected.

The 2006 Franco–Italian–Spanish Middle East Peace Plan was proposed after Israel invaded the Gaza Strip in Operation "Autumn Clouds" by Spanish premier José Luis Rodríguez Zapatero during talks with French president Jacques Chirac. Italy's prime minister Romano Prodi gave his full support to the plan.

On 26 November, a ceasefire was signed by Palestinian organisations and Israel, and Israel withdrew its troops while the Palestinian Authority forces deployed to stop Qassam rocket launchings. Following the truce over 60 Qassam rockets were fired from the Gaza Strip at Israel, and one Palestinian (armed with guns and grenades) was killed by the IDF. On 19 December, the Palestinian Islamic Jihad began taking open responsibility for the Qassam rocket firing, because they said Israel killed two of their members in Jenin.

A series of battles between Palestinian militants in Hamas-governed Gaza and the Israel Defense Forces (IDF) that began in mid-May 2007, with the inter-Palestinian violence flaring in the meantime. Palestinians fired more than 220 Qassam rocket attacks on Israel (Sderot and the western Negev) in more than a week. The Israeli Air Force fired missiles and bombs at the launching sites. The fighting came amid serious Palestinian factional violence and reports of growing level of humanitarian crisis in the region. Hamas said they will continue to retaliate against Israeli strikes.

=== 2007–2022 ===
In September 2007, Israel declared Gaza "hostile territory." Historian Jean-Pierre Filiu finds this assertion "absurd", given that up to this point Israel had already fought 9 wars against Gaza. The declaration allowed Israel to prevent the transfer of electricity, fuel, and other supplies into Gaza. Hamas considered this a declaration of war, while Israel stated its purpose was to pressure Hamas into ending Qassam rocket attacks (which Israel said were intensifying). Israel's decision to cut fuel supplies to Gaza were widely condemned (including by the European Union) as "collective punishment."

Israel has also arrested Hamas officials in the West Bank, including two cabinet members. Such arrests have been strongly condemned by international organizations and politicians.

By January 2008, according to a United Nations study, the economic effects of Israel's blockade on Gaza reached a critical threshold. Finally, on 17 January 2008, Israel sealed the border completely following a rise in rocket attacks. The breach of the Gaza-Egypt border began on 23 January 2008, after gunmen in the Gaza Strip set off an explosion near the Rafah Border Crossing, destroying part of the former Israeli Gaza Strip barrier. The United Nations estimates that as many as half the 1.5 million population of the Gaza Strip crossed the border into Egypt seeking food and supplies.

==== Operation "Hot Winter" ====
On 27 February 2008, Palestinian militants fired more than 40 Qassam rockets into southern Israel and the Israeli army fired three missiles at the Palestinian Interior Ministry in Gaza destroying the building. On 28 February 2008, Israeli aircraft bombed a police station near the Gaza City home of Hamas leader Ismail Haniyeh, killing several children. The Israeli military says its air and ground operations against militants firing rockets from northern Gaza have hit at least 23 armed Palestinians, while Palestinian sources have reported higher death tolls and say many civilians have also been killed.

Israel began its air and ground operations on 29 February. The IDF's offensive in Gaza has killed more than 100 Palestinians in less than a week. Palestinians fired 150 rockets at Israel which killed three Israelis. The United States called for an end to clashes between Israel and the Palestinians. The Palestinian president, Mahmoud Abbas, has accused Israel of "international terrorism", saying its assault on Gaza constitutes "more than a holocaust." On 3 March Abbas suspended all contact with Israel over its assault on Gaza as the Israeli government sent warplanes to hit more targets early on Monday and vowed to continue its offensive. The European Union condemned what it called "disproportionate use of force" by the Israeli military in Gaza after 54 Palestinians were killed in the highest casualty toll for a single day since fighting erupted in 2000. United Nations Secretary-General Ban Ki-moon also issued a condemnation of what he termed Israel's "excessive and disproportionate" response, and called on Israel "to cease such attacks", while denouncing the ongoing rocket attacks on Sderot and Ashkelon.

In the Muslim world, demonstrators took to the streets to protest the IDF attacks. Iran's Supreme Leader Ayatollah Ali Khamenei called on Muslims to rise up and their leaders to hit Israel "in the face with their nations' anger." In Lebanon, hundreds of Hezbollah supporters gathered at the Fatima Gate at the border between Lebanon and Israel, shouting "Death to Israel" and waving Lebanese and Palestinian flags. In Egypt, thousands of students held protests at universities across the country calling on Arab leaders to stop Israeli aggression and support the Palestinians. Some protesters burned Israeli and American flags. About 10,000 protesters, mainly from Jordan's mainstream Muslim Brotherhood and smaller opposition groups, took to the streets in one of the country's most vocal and largest anti-Israeli demonstrations in recent years. Saudi Arabia meanwhile compared the IDF offensive to "Nazi war crimes" and called on the international community to stop what it called the "mass killings" of Palestinians. Turkey's Prime Minister Recep Tayyip Erdogan said that the IDF attacks can have "no humanitarian justification" and added that Israel was rejecting a "diplomatic solution" to the dispute. Most Israeli tanks and troops pulled out of northern Gaza 3 March 2008, and an Israel Defense Forces spokesman confirmed that the Israeli military was ending offensive operations there after five days.

On 29 February 2008, the Israeli military launched Operation "Hot Winter" (also called Operation "Warm Winter") in response to Qassam rockets fired from the Strip by Hamas. The Israeli army killed 112 Palestinians, and Palestinian militants killed three Israelis. More than 150 Palestinians and seven Israelis have been injured.

There was widespread international alarm at the scale of the operation, with the US state department encouraging Israel to exercise caution to avoid the loss of innocent life, and the European Union and the United Nations criticising Israel's "disproportionate use of force". The European Union also demanded an immediate end to Palestinian militant rocket attacks on Israel and urged Israel to halt activities that endanger civilians, saying they were "in violation of international law."

==== 2008 Hamas–Israel ceasefire ====
Monthly rocket hits in Israel in 2008, according to Israeli military-tied Meir Amit Intelligence and Terrorism Information Center.

The 2008 Hamas–Israel ceasefire was an Egyptian-brokered six-month Tahdia (an Arabic term for a lull) "for the Gaza area", which went into effect between Hamas and Israel on 19 June 2008. Hamas' obligation was to stop the rocket attacks on Israel. During the initial 5-months of the ceasefire, and after a shaky start during the initial week, these attacks from Gaza decreased significantly for a total of 19 rocket and 18 mortar shell launchings, compared to 1,199 rockets and 1,072 mortar shells in 2008 up to 19 June, a reduction of 98%. Mark Regev, spokesman for the Israeli Prime Minister acknowledged that "there were no Hamas rockets during the ceasefire before November the 4th". Israel's obligation was to cease attacks on Gaza and once the ceasefire held, to gradually begin to ease its punishing blockade of Gaza. The agreement called on Israel to increase the level of goods entering Gaza by 30 percent over the pre-lull period within 72 hours and to open all border crossings and "allow the transfer of all goods that were banned and restricted to go into Gaza" within 13 days after the beginning of the ceasefire. The increase in supplies of food, water, medicine and fuel did improve, but the increase was only to an average of about 20 percent of normal levels, compared to the Hamas compliance in reducing rocket fire by 98%. Two months later the volume of goods arriving was too low to significantly improve living conditions, preventing UNRWA from replenishing its stores. Israel told U.S. officials in 2008 it would keep Gaza's economy "on the brink of collapse".

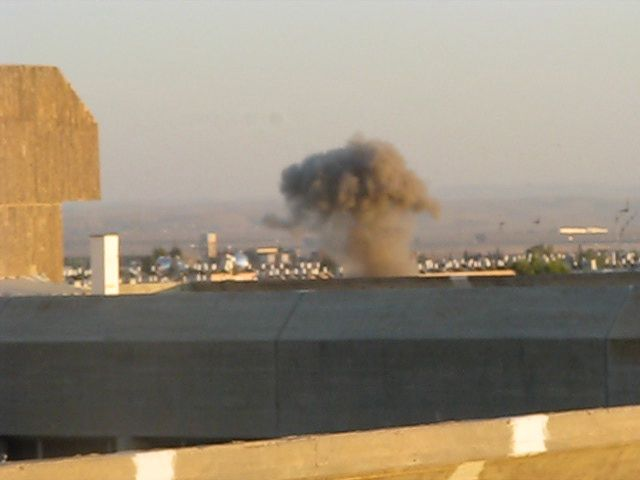
A Grad rocket hitting Beersheba, January 2009

On 4 November 2008 Israel broke the ceasefire with an attack on Gaza. The Israeli military claimed the target of the raid was a tunnel that they said Hamas was planning to use to capture Israeli soldiers positioned on the border fence 250m away. Hamas officials differed, however, claiming that the tunnel was being dug for defensive purposes, not to capture IDF personnel, according to Dr Robert Pastor (of the Carter Institute), and an IDF official confirmed that fact to him. Hamas replied to the Israeli attack with a barrage of rocket fire. With this incursion into Gaza territory and its non-compliance with the easing of the embargo, Israel had failed to comply with two aspects of the June 2008 ceasefire.

When the six-month truce officially expired on 19 December, Hamas launched 50 to more than 70 rockets and mortars into Israel over the next three days, though no Israelis were injured. On 21 December, Hamas said it was ready to stop the attacks and renew the truce if Israel stopped its "aggression" in Gaza and opened up its border crossings. On 27 and 28 December, Israel implemented Operation Cast Lead against Hamas. Egyptian President Hosni Mubarak said "We warned Hamas repeatedly that rejecting the truce would push Israel to aggression against Gaza."

=== First Gaza War (2008–2009) ===
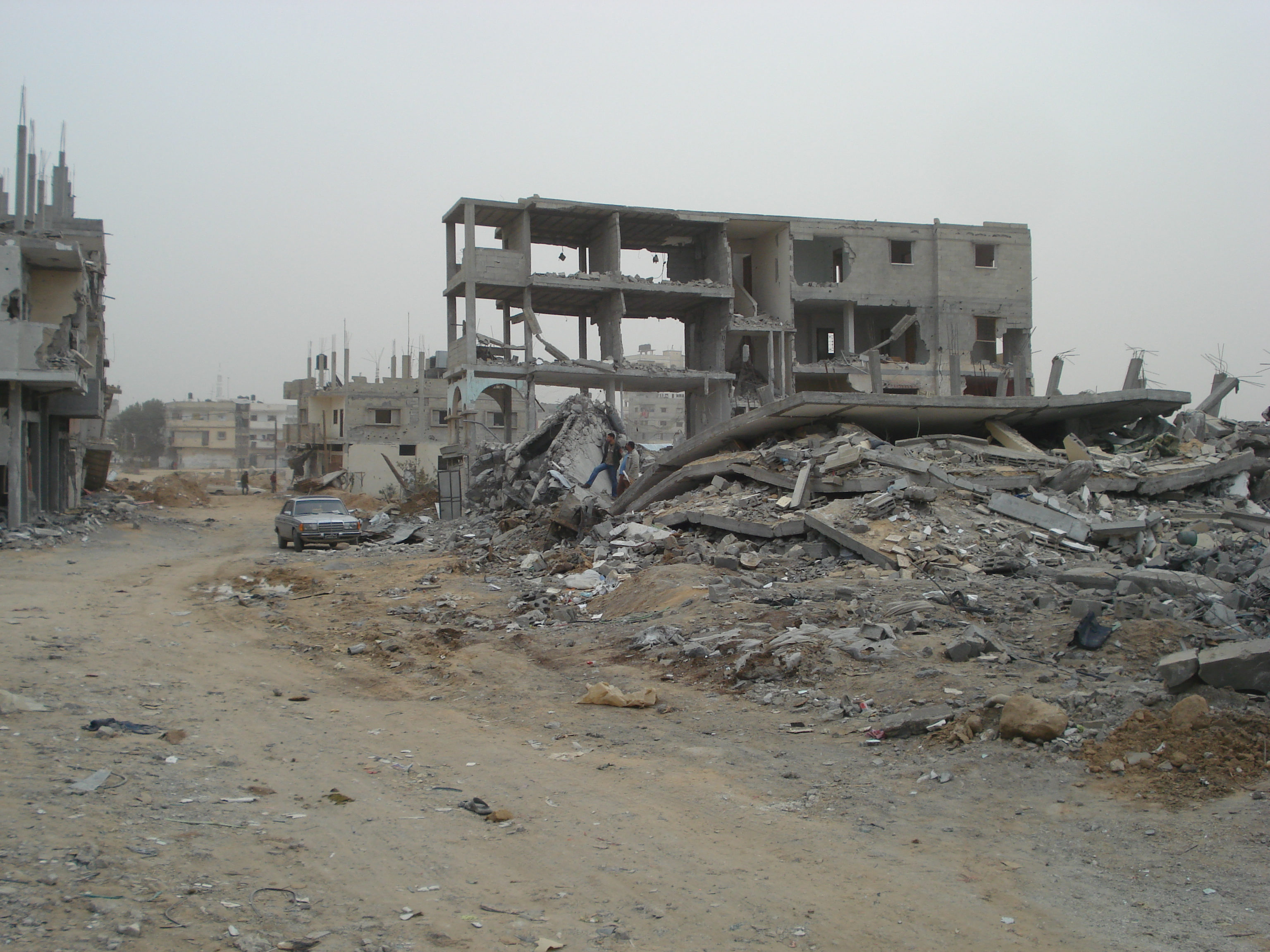
Destroyed buildings in Gaza City, January 2009

The Gaza War started when Israel launched a large military campaign in the Gaza Strip on 27 December 2008, codenamed Operation "Cast Lead" (Hebrew: מבצע עופרת יצוקה), with the stated aim of stopping Hamas rocket attacks on southern Israel and arms smuggling into Gaza. The conflict has also been called the Gaza massacre in the Arab world (Arabic: مجزرة غزة). A fragile six-month truce between Hamas and Israel expired on 19 December 2008. The Israeli operation began with an intense bombardment of the Gaza Strip, targeting Hamas bases, police training camps, police headquarters and offices. Civilian infrastructure, including mosques, houses, medical facilities and schools, were also attacked, as Israel stated that many of them were used by combatants, and as storage spaces for weapons and rockets. Hamas intensified its rocket and mortar attacks against targets in Israel throughout the conflict, hitting previously untargeted cities such as Beersheba and Ashdod. On 3 January 2009, the Israeli ground invasion began. During the war Hamas would execute many Palestinians and Fatah members during a period of political violence. Human rights groups and aid organisations have accused Hamas and Israel of war crimes. An estimated 1,166–1,417 Palestinians and 13 Israelis died in the conflict. The conflict came to an end on 18 January after first Israel and then Hamas announced unilateral ceasefires. On 21 January, Israel completed its withdrawal from the Gaza Strip. On 2 March, it was reported that international donors had pledged $4.5 billion in aid for the Palestinians, mainly for rebuilding Gaza after Israel's offensive. This war was considered to be the largest, most devastating and deadliest military operation in Gaza since the Six-Day War in 1967 and until the 2014 Gaza war.

=== March 2010 events ===
On 26 March 2010, two Israeli soldiers and two Hamas militants were killed during clashes on the Gaza Strip's southern border. Two other soldiers were wounded during the fighting which broke out east of the town of Khan Younis. They are the first Israeli soldiers to have been killed in hostile fire in or around Gaza since Israel's major offensive there in January 2009, according to the BBC.

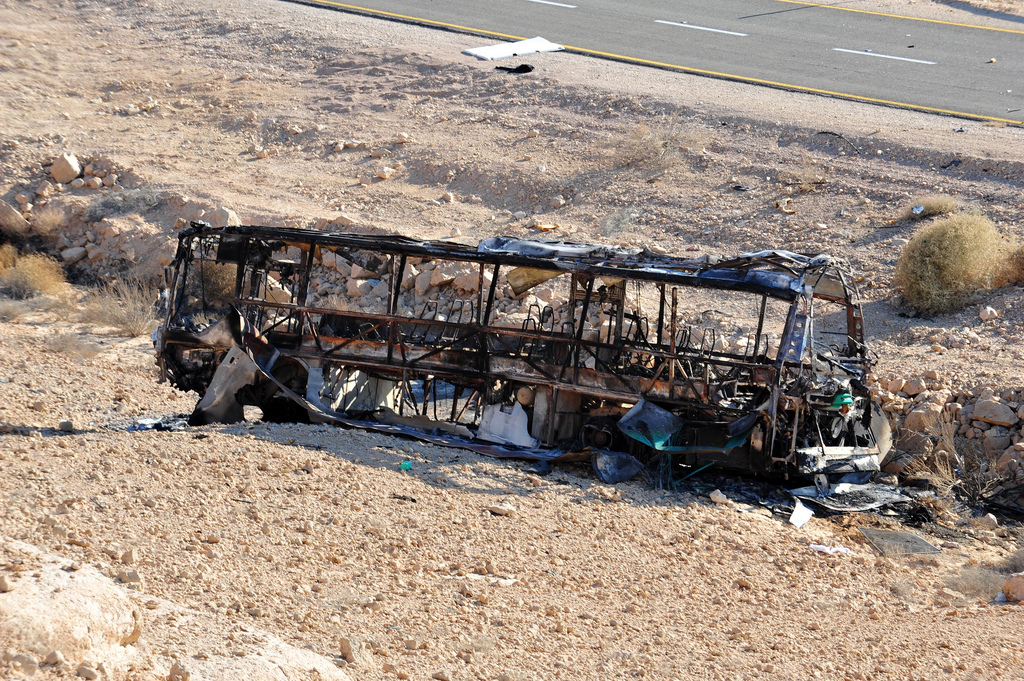
Charred remains of an Israeli bus hit in the 2011 attacks

=== 2011 cross-border attack ===
On 18 August 2011, a series of cross-border attacks was carried out in southern Israel near the Egyptian border, by a squad of militants. The militants first opened fire at civilian bus. Several minutes later, a bomb was detonated next to an Israeli army patrol along Israel's border with Egypt. In a third attack, an anti-tank missile hit a private vehicle, killing four civilians.

=== Operation "Returning Echo" ===
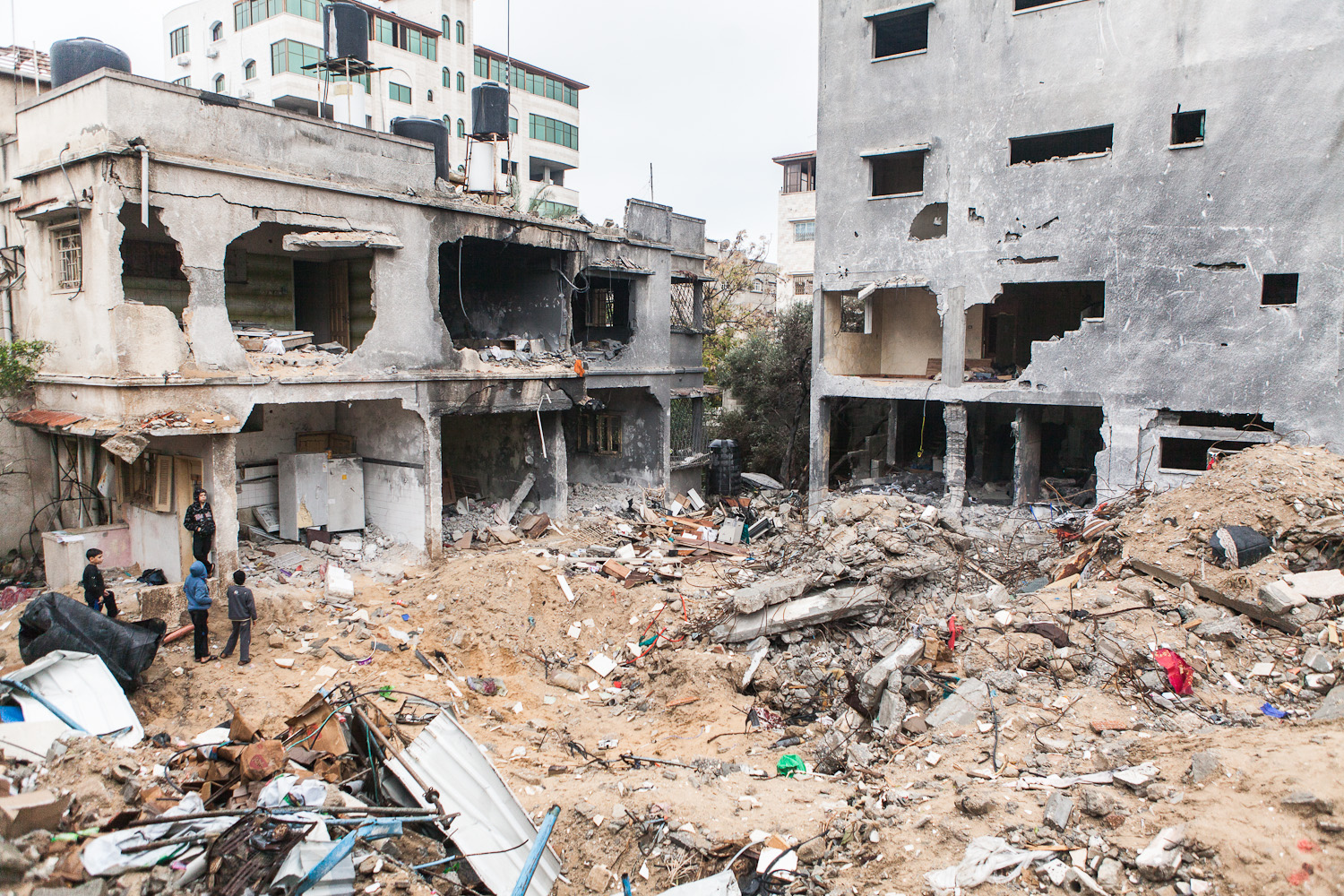
Destroyed house in Gaza City, December 2012

During the second week of March 2012, Israeli Defense Forces (IDF) initiated Operation "Returning Echo". It was the worst outbreak of violence covered by the media in the region since the 2008–09 Operation "Cast Lead" (the Gaza War).

=== 2012 Gaza War ===
US Ambassador to Israel's tour of attack tunnel

Rocket attacks fired at Israel from the Gaza Strip, 2001–2021.

Attacks by Israel and Gazans grew intense late in October 2012. An Israeli air strike killed Ahmed Jabari, chief of the Hamas military wing in Gaza. During the operation, four Israeli civilians and one soldier were killed by Palestinian rocket fire, according to Palestinian Centre for Human Rights 158 Palestinians had been killed, of which: 102 were civilians, 55 militants and one was policeman. Thirty children and 13 women were among the killed, while the Israel Defense Forces presented statistics showing that out of 177 Palestinians killed, 120 were militants. Most of the fighting was by bombs, aerial attacks, artillery, and rockets; the rockets being primarily used by the Palestinians and air strikes primarily by the Israelis. Attacked locations include Beersheva, Tel Aviv, Ashdod, Ofakim, Gaza, the rest of the Gaza Strip, the Shaar Hanegev, and Eshkol Regional Council. The United States, United Kingdom, Canada, Germany and other Western countries expressed support for Israel's right to defend itself, and/or condemned the Palestinian rocket attacks on Israel. Iran, Egypt, Turkey, North Korea and several other Arab and Muslim countries condemned the Israeli operation.

=== 2014 Gaza War ===
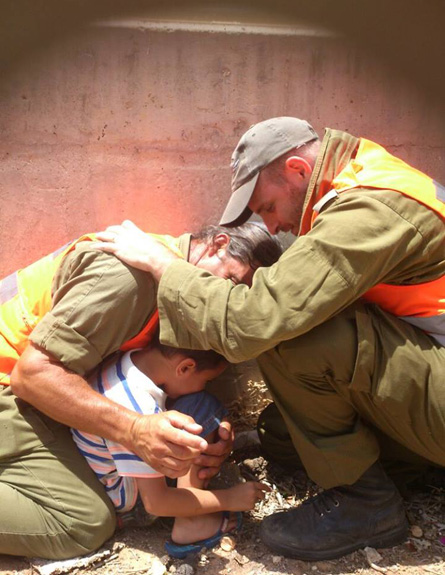
Israeli soldiers shielding a 4-year-old boy during a rocket attack, July 2014

In 2014, fighting intensified between Israel and Hamas, leading to another full-scale Gaza War, this one far deadlier than the previous in 2008–2009. The IDF launched Operation Protective Edge on 8 July 2014, in response to Hamas rocket attacks, which were launched following an earlier Israeli air strike against Gaza and on 17 July 2014, Israel troops entered the Gaza Strip. UN OCHA says 2,205 Palestinians (including at least 1,483 civilians) and 71 Israelis (including 66 soldiers) and one foreign national in Israel were killed in the conflict. The war came to an end after 50 days of conflict when a ceasefire was agreed upon on 26 August 2014.

=== 2018 Border Protest ===
During the 2018 Land Day protests, 168 Palestinians have been killed and thousands were injured during clashes with Israeli troops at the Gaza-Israel border.

=== Clashes in November 2018 ===
Violence flared up again on 11 November 2018 when seven Palestinian militants were killed during a botched raid by the Israel Defense Forces in the southeastern Gaza Strip. One IDF officer was killed and another was injured. Over a dozen rockets were subsequently fired from Gaza, three of which were shot down. After a series of intense fire exchanges, ceasefire was agreed upon on 13 November 2018.

=== March 2019 ===
On 25 March, seven people were injured in Israel after a rocket attack destroyed a home in Mishmeret. The Israel Defense Forces confirmed that Hamas was responsible for the attack. The Israeli Air Force sent jets to strike multiple targets in the Gaza Strip, including the office of senior Hamas official Ismail Haniyeh, and Hamas' military intelligence headquarters in Gaza City.

=== May 2019 ===
On 3 May, two Israeli soldiers were injured by a Palestinian Islamic Jihad sniper from in the Gaza Strip during the weekly protests at the Gaza–Israel border. In response, the Israeli Air Force carried out an air strike, killing four Palestinians. In addition, two other Palestinians were killed and 60 wounded, 36 of them by Israeli gunfire.

Following this, Gazan militants launched hundreds of rockets at Israel. In response, the Israeli Air Force struck numerous targets within the Gaza Strip. In addition, Israel increased its troop presence near the Gaza–Israel border.

=== November 2019 ===
The 2019 Gaza–Israel clashes code-named by Israel as Operation Black Belt, took place in November 2019, between the Israel Defense Forces (IDF) and Palestinian Islamic Jihad (PIJ) following the targeted killing of senior PIJ commander Baha Abu al-Ata in Gaza, and the attempted killing of senior PIJ commander Akram al-Ajouri in Damascus, Syria by the IDF. PIJ responded with rocket fire into Israel, including long-range rockets fired towards Tel Aviv, leading to several civilians being wounded. In response to the rocket fire, Israel carried out air strikes and artillery shelling in the Gaza Strip, killing and wounding several militants as well as civilians. A ceasefire went into effect after 48 hours of clashes, though it was breached by some Palestinian militants.

=== April 2021 ===
On 15 April, Israeli military conducted military strikes targets in Gaza after a rocket was fired at southern Israel. Targets included an armaments production facility, a tunnel for smuggling weaponry and a Hamas military post.

=== May 2021 ===
Hamas demanded Israel remove its forces from Al-Aqsa Mosque by 10 May at 6 p.m. Minutes after the deadline passed, Hamas fired more than 150 rockets into Israel from Gaza. In response, Israel launched air strikes in the Gaza strip on the same day.

=== August 2022 ===
On 5 August 2022, Israel launched air strikes on Gaza after a senior Palestinian Islamic Jihad militant had been arrested in the West Bank four days earlier, due to fears of retaliation.

== 2023–present ==
=== April 2023 ===
In the aftermath of the 2023 Al-Aqsa clashes, Palestinian militant groups fired rockets into Israel from the Gaza Strip and Lebanon.

=== May 2023 ===
On 9 May 2023, Israel conducted a series of air strikes on the Gaza Strip, called Operation Shield and Arrow Palestinians launched Rocket attacks against Israel until a Ceasefire was agreed upon on 13 May 2023.

=== October 2023–present war ===
Map of the Gaza war

On 7 October 2023, Palestinian militant groups, mainly Hamas and Palestinian Islamic Jihad, with other groups such as the Popular Front for the Liberation of Palestine, launched a major attack on Israel from the Gaza Strip. The attack included rocket barrages and vehicle-transported attacks across the border on Israeli communities and forces, causing many casualties; 828 civilians and 367 soldiers were killed. In response, the government of Israel declared a state of emergency and war; The Israeli military retaliated by conducting a counteroffensive and an extensive aerial bombardment campaign on Gaza followed by an invasion. The first day was the deadliest in Israel's history, while the war is the deadliest for Palestinians in the larger Israeli–Palestinian conflict.

== International response ==
United Nations
Secretary General Ban Ki-moon stated he believed that the Qassam rocket attacks by factions in Gaza were "completely unacceptable." He also said he believed that the Palestinian Authority should "take the necessary steps to restore law and order, and for all factions to abide by the ceasefire." Ban also stated he was "deeply concerned by the mounting number of civilian casualties from Israeli military operations in Gaza." The Secretary General also called on Israel "to abide by international law and to ensure that its actions do not target civilians or put them under risk." Ban had appointed Michael Williams to the Middle East for talks with both sides. Williams soon said "I'm troubled when I see Israeli soldiers arresting Palestinian legislators. I'm troubled that the education minister was arrested," after Israel arrested several Hamas officials in the West Bank. Williams met with Palestinian President Mahmoud Abbas and Foreign Minister Ziad Abu Amr in Gaza City. After continuing Israeli attacks and arrests, and the continuing rocket fire from Gaza, Williams said that "I'm very troubled by the level of violence here [...] I think the UN, the international community in general, have been very concerned about the level of intra-Palestinian violence, but also by the Israeli attacks which I know have caused civilian deaths, considerable numbers." Following the discovery of mass graves, UN human rights chief Volker Türk called for an independent investigation on the intentional killing of civilians by the IDF.

United States
After the death of a woman from a rocket attack in Sderot, a representative for the U.S. Government reaffirmed the position that Israel has the right to self-defense. State Department spokesman Sean McCormack also stated that his country is aware of the difficulty of targeting terrorists without civilian casualties. He added that Israel must "take all possible actions in order to avoid any civilian casualties, to avoid any undue damage to the Palestinian infrastructure and always to consider the effects of their actions on the political process, the Israeli-Palestinian track and moving that forward." The Republican plan, approved by the United States House of Representatives, allocates $14.5bn in military aid for Israel. Also, Israel has received the highest amount of military assistance from the US compared to any other nation since World War II, with aid exceeding $124 billion.

Turkey
In response to the 2014 Israel–Gaza conflict, to the interdiction of the activity of the Moslem Brothers in Egypt and to what he interpreted as Egyptian support for Israel, Turkish Prime Minister Recep Tayyip Erdoğan called Egyptian President Abdel Fattah el-Sisi an "illegitimate tyrant". He also stated that "If Israel continues with this attitude, it will definitely be tried at international courts."

Bolivia
In July 2014, Bolivia declared Israel a "terrorist state", tightening visa restrictions for Israelis seeking to travel to Bolivia. In 2019 relations were restored following a political crisis which saw the temporary ousting of the MAS-IPSP, with an Israeli delegation visiting Bolivia in 2020. Following the events of October 2023, the Bolivian government announced on 1 November that it was severing diplomatic ties with Israel. Foreign Minister Freddy Mamani called Israel's response "disproportionate" and President Luis Arce described the actions as "war crimes", with the Bolivians calling for an immediate ceasefire.

Indonesia
The Indonesian people and government were very concerned for Gaza during the conflict. They donated humanitarian aid and some volunteered to come to Gaza and work on the ground. Indonesia also built a hospital in Gaza named "Indonesia hospital", which opened in 2015. Its construction was not impacted during the fighting and remained on schedule. This hospital was bombed by Israel three years later.

Egypt
The Egyptian President Abdel Fattah el-Sisi is not allowing a refugee camp on the Sinai Peninsula of Egypt because he says it would allow the Palestinians to launch terrorist attacks from there against Israel, and Egypt would get blamed for it. Egypt has closed their border from Gaza to Egypt but are allowing humanitarian aid to flow into Gaza from Egypt during the Gaza war.

South Africa

=== Other responses ===
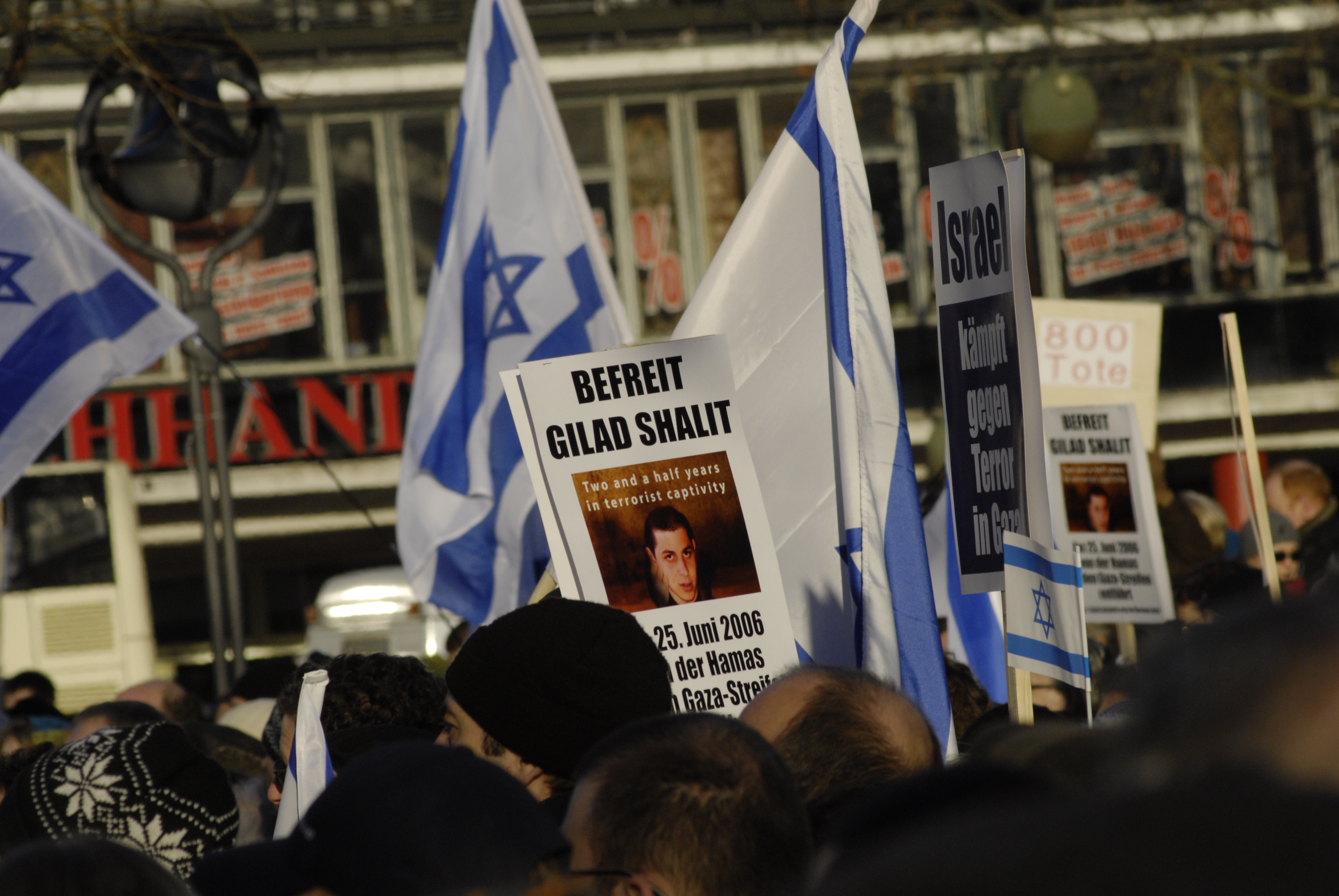
Pro-Israel-Demo in Berlin in 2009

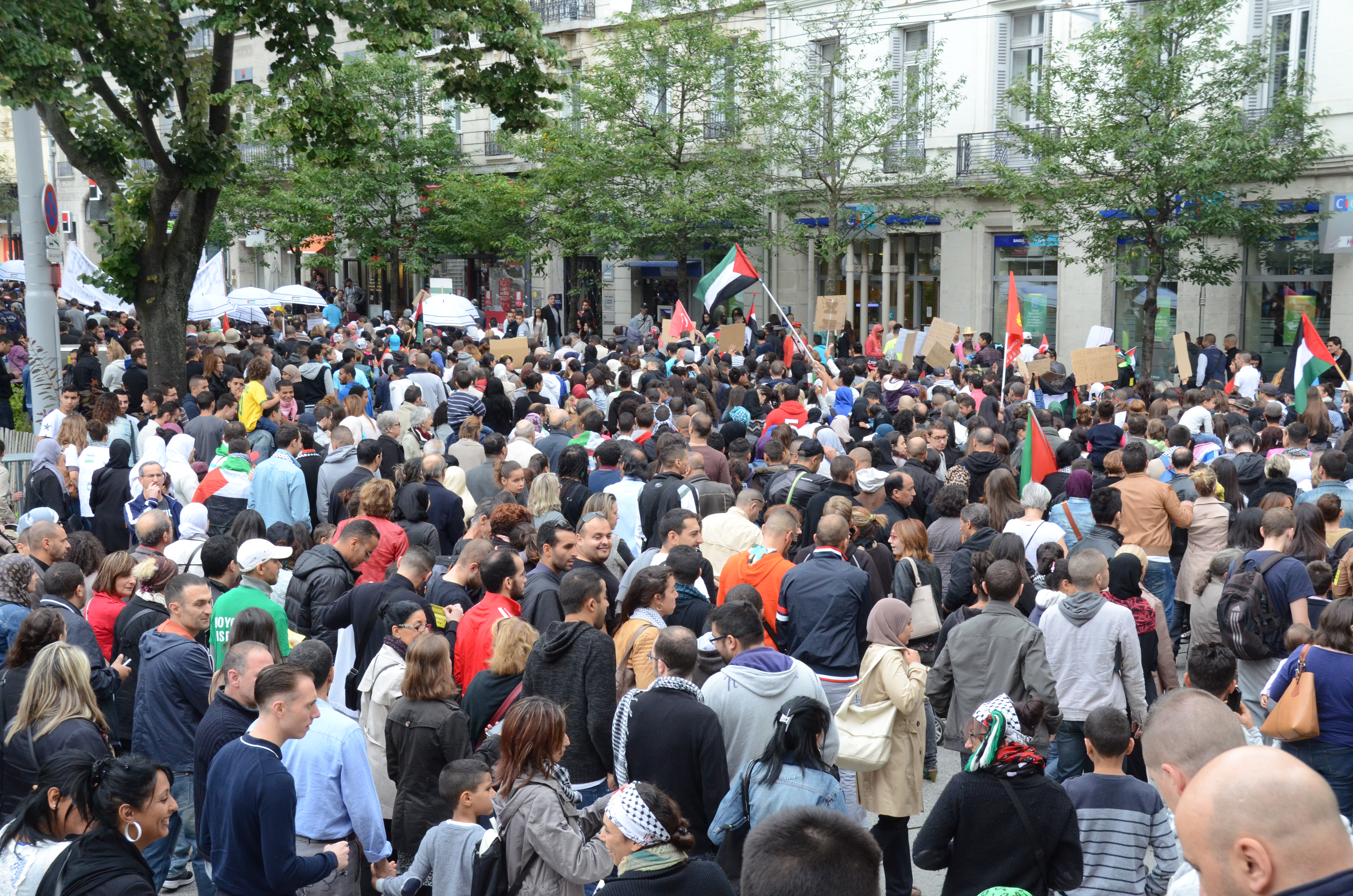
Pro-Palestinian demonstration in Paris, France in 2014

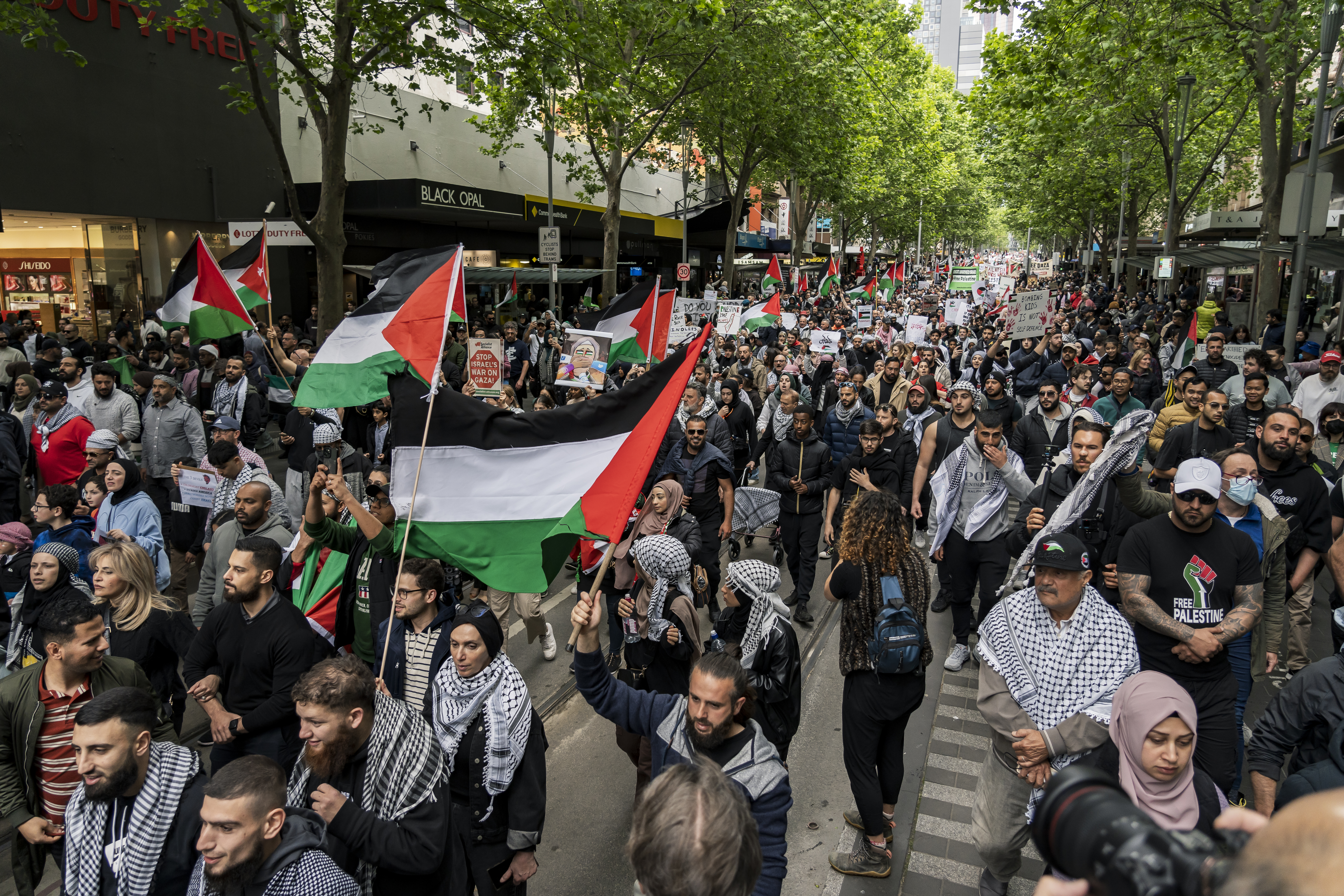
Pro-Palestine protest in Melbourne, Australia in October 2023

On 31 July 2014 on the 23rd day of the 2014 Israel–Gaza conflict, Ireland's Foreign Minister Charlie Flanagan said he shared "the horror and revulsion of senators and very many of our citizens at the horrendous scenes we have witnessed since the start of the Israeli military operation." The Irish government, he said, condemned "both the unacceptably high civilian casualty rate resulting from disproportionate military action on Israel's part as well as the firing of rockets by Hamas and other militants into Israel." On 5 August 2014 a member of the British cabinet resigned over the UK government's approach to the 2014 conflict.

During the US Presidential campaigns of 2016, Democratic candidate Bernie Sanders criticized Israel for its treatment of Gaza, and in particular criticized Netanyahu for "overreacting" and causing unnecessary civilian deaths. In April 2016 the Anti-Defamation League called on Sanders to withdraw remarks he made to the New York Daily News, which the ADL said exaggerated the death toll of the 2014 Israel–Gaza conflict. Sanders said "over 10,000 innocent people were killed", a number far in excess of Palestinian or Israel sources' estimates. In response, Sanders said that he accepted a corrected number of the death toll as 2,300 in the course of the interview and that he would make every effort to set the record straight. The transcript of the interview failed to note that Sanders said "Okay" to the corrected number presented by the interviewer during the course of the interview.

Public opinion poll conducted on 23–28 October 2023 by the polling company iPanel in collaboration with Tel Aviv University found that 57.5% of Israeli Jews believed that the Israeli military was using "too little" firepower during the retaliatory strikes in Gaza, while 36.6% believed the amount of firepower was "appropriate", 4.2% were not sure, and only 1.8% said the IDF was using "too much" firepower. In contrast, 50.5% of Israeli Arabs believed that the Israeli military was using "too much" firepower in Gaza. The Direct Polls survey published in December 2023 found that 83% of Israelis supported encouraging the voluntary emigration of residents of the Gaza Strip. Public opinion poll conducted in December 2023 by the Israel Democracy Institute found that 87% of Jewish Israelis supported the war in Gaza. Seventy-five percent of Jewish Israelis rejected the Biden administration's calls to change the IDF's strategy to one that "reduces the heavy bombing of densely populated areas."

=== Analysis ===
Some analysts believe the conflict has drawn in Egypt, Iran, Turkey, and Qatar, supporting different sides of the conflict in light of the regional standoff between Iran and Saudi Arabia on one hand and between Qatar and Saudi Arabia on the other, as well as crisis in Egyptian–Turkish relations.

== Impact ==
=== Gaza ===
Israeli and Palestinian deaths preceding the Gaza war. Of the Palestinian deaths 5,360 were in Gaza, 1,007 in the West Bank, 37 in Israel. Most were civilians on both sides.

According to NGOs and the UN, the recent wars and the blockade have led to worsening living conditions in Gaza, and it could become unlivable by 2020.

==== 2023 ====
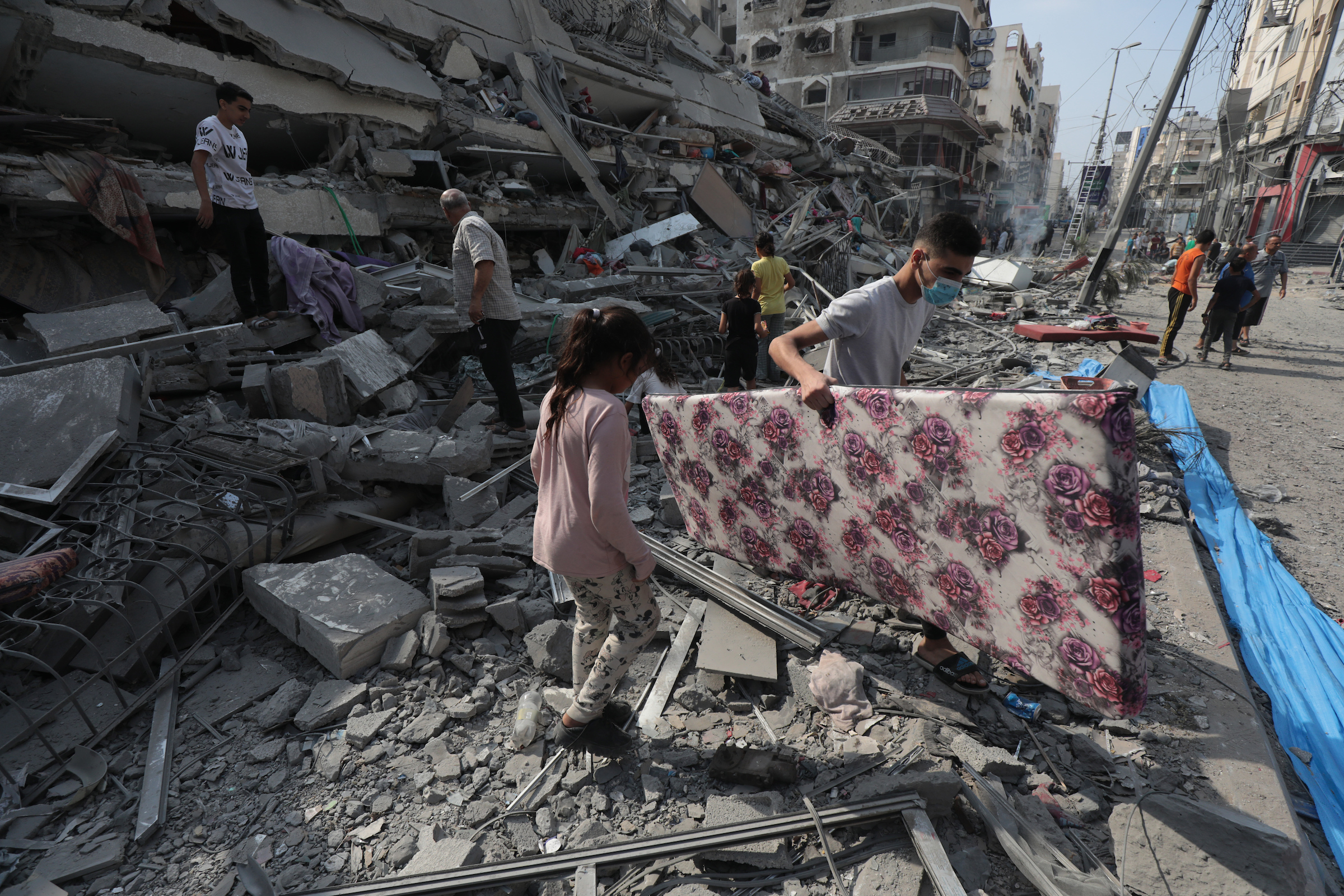
Residents inspect the ruins of an apartment destroyed by Israeli air strikes.

The humanitarian situation in Gaza has been termed a "crisis" and a "catastrophe." As a result of Israel's siege, Gaza faces shortages of fuel, food, medication, water, and medical supplies. UN Humanitarian Aid chief Martin Griffiths said, "the noose around the civilian population in Gaza is tightening." On 13 October, UNRWA commissioner Philippe Lazzarini said, "The scale and speed of the unfolding humanitarian crisis is bone-chilling."

On 16 October, doctors warned of an impending disease outbreak due to hospital overcrowding and unburied bodies. The same day, the World Health Organization stated there were only "24 hours of water, electricity and fuel left" before "a real catastrophe." On 18 October, the United States vetoed a UN resolution urging humanitarian aid to Gaza. The World Health Organization stated the situation in Gaza was "spiraling out of control."

On 20 October, Doctors Without Borders stated it was "deeply concerned for the fate of everyone in Gaza right now." On 21 October, a joint statement by UNICEF, WHO, UNDP, UNFPA, and WFP stated, "the world must do more" for Gaza. On 22 October, UNRWA announced it would run out of fuel within three days, resulting in "no water, no functioning hospitals and bakeries."

Since 7 October 2023, IDF has been accused of the extrajudicial killing of Palestinian unarmed detainees, doctors, and workers, making threats of mutilation, death, arson, and rape, torturing of Palestinians detained without legal charges. It has also been accused of using excessive force against dozens of schools and hospitals, theft, and cruel and unnecessary treatment of Palestinians. During the fighting, far-right Channel 14 kept logs going of buildings destroyed and terrorists killed, with all Palestinian casualties labeled as terrorists. On Channel 14, the Hamas surprise attack was framed as caused by a "leftist cancer," by a Likud party member, while Shimon Riklin, a Channel 14 journalist and anchor, publicly backed war crimes.

=== Israel ===
Due to the conflict, Israel has stepped up its defense measures in the southern communities and cities of Israel. This includes building fortifications on existing structures and bomb shelters and developing an alarm system (Red Color).

=== Humanitarian situation after the October 2025 ceasefire ===
Following the October 2025 ceasefire, the United Nations World Food Programme (WFP) reported that an average of 560 tonnes of food entered the Gaza Strip each day. However, due to extensive infrastructure damage and the closure of several key crossings, aid deliveries have not reached the famine-stricken northern areas. Only a small fraction of aid convoys have reached the central and southern regions, while access to northern Gaza has remained largely impossible. The UN humanitarian coordinator warned that thousands of trucks per week would be required to stabilize food supplies and prevent widespread starvation. In a related statement, UN Women estimated that more than one million women and girls in Gaza were facing food insecurity, with around 250,000 in urgent need of nutritional support.

A spokesperson for the UN World Food Programme announced that aid distribution has not yet begun in Gaza City because two border crossings in the northern part of the Gaza Strip—Zikim and Aruz—remain closed. These are precisely the areas where the humanitarian crisis is most severe.

== List of Gaza–Israel military conflicts ==
List of Gaza–Israel military conflicts
Number (Note: Follows the numbering scheme given in Jean-Pierre Filiu's The Twelve Wars on Gaza)	Conflict	Period	Arabs killed	Israelis killed	Infrastructure damaged or destroyed	Population displaced	Other impact
1	1948 Palestine war and 1948 Arab–Israeli War	1948–1949				200,000 Arabs fled or were expelled by Israel into Gaza	Creation of Gaza Strip as an entity
2	Palestinian Fedayeen insurgency	1949–1956	216 (Up to 1955)	8 (Up to 1955)			Conflict over Palestinian "infiltrators" – often refugees trying to return home
3	Israeli occupation of Gaza during the Suez Crisis	1956–1957	1,231–1,446 (Note: 1,231 dead plus 215 disappeared)	172+ killed			1% of the total population of Gaza Strip was either killed, wounded, tortured or imprisoned by Israel.
4	Conquest of Gaza during the Six-Day War	1967			90% of UNRWA schools	~45,000 civilians (10% of Gaza's population) fled or were expelled by Israel	
5	1967–1971 Gazan insurgency	1967–1971	39 civilians, 71 combatants	9 civilians, 8 soldiers			Israel detained approximately 10,000 Gazans without trial between 1967 and 1970.
6	Three-way conflict between Israel, Palestinian nationalists and Islamist militants	1979–1983					
7	First Intifada	1987–1993	523, 78,338 hospitalized				42% of Gaza's children reported being assaulted by the IDF
8	Second Intifada	2001–2005	~3,000				
9	Post-disengagement incursions into Gaza	2005–2007	359 civilians, 309 combatants (Note: 309 figure comes from source giving total casualties of 668)	4 soldiers, 4 civilians			
10	First Gaza War	2008–2009	1,181 civilians, (Note: 1,181 figure comes from source giving total casualties of 1,417) 236 combatants	10 soldiers, 3 civilians	46,000 homes, 34 hospitals and clinics, 214 schools, 52 mosques and churches	100,000 people made homeless	80% of agricultural produce and equipment destroyed
11	2012 Gaza War	2012	103 civilians, 55 combatants	4 civilians, 2 soldiers	97 schools, 49 mosques and churches, 15 hospitals and clinics	350–700 families	
12	2014 Gaza War	2014	2,251 killed (65% civilians)	67 soldiers, 6 civilians	203 mosques and 2 churches, 25% of homes in Gaza city	520,000 (30% of Gaza's population) internally displaced	
13	2021 Israel–Palestine crisis	2021	128 civilians, 128 combatants	14 civilians, 1 soldiers	15,000 homes, 58 schools, 9 hospitals, 19 clinics	113,000 internally displaced	
14	Gaza war	2023–present	46,000–70,000+	876+ civilians, 756+ soldiers			

== See also ==
- Israeli disengagement from Gaza
- Israeli–Lebanese conflict
- List of modern conflicts in the Middle East
- Outline of the Gaza war
- Palestinian political violence
- Reactions in Iran to the Gaza War (2008-2009)
- Sinai insurgency § Alleged Israeli involvement
- Sinai insurgency § Gaza Strip
