= Miska, Tulkarm =

Miska مسكة
- Village
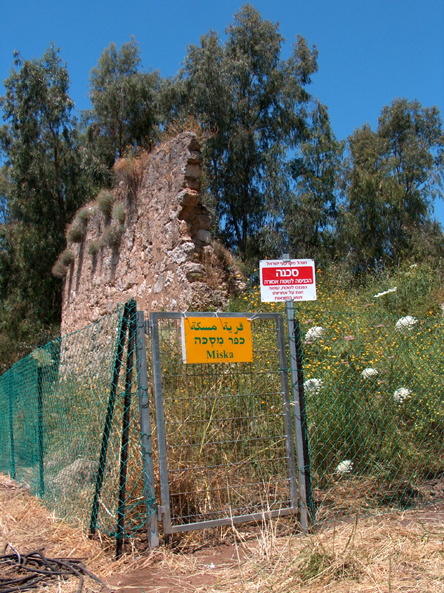
- Remains of the village mosque, 2007
- Etymology: The water-hole
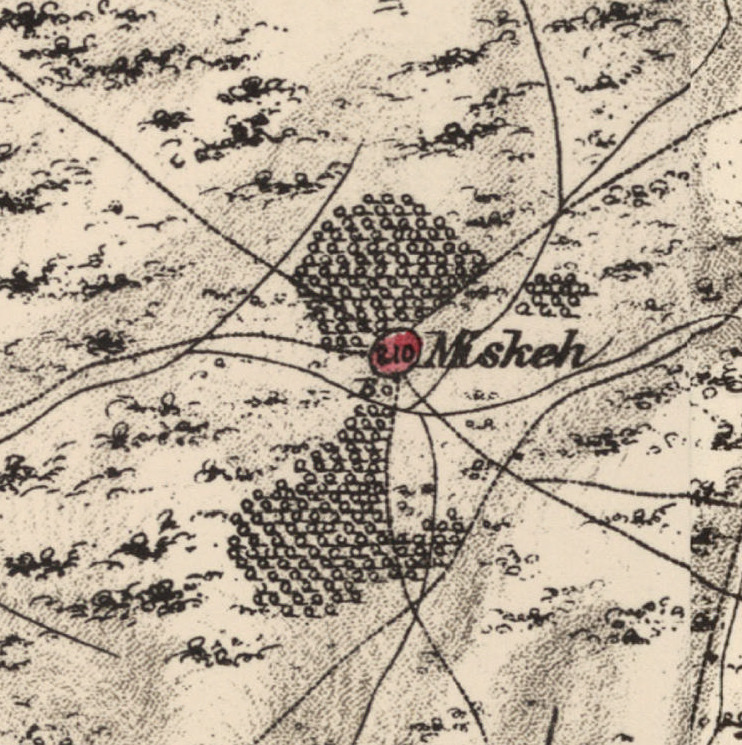
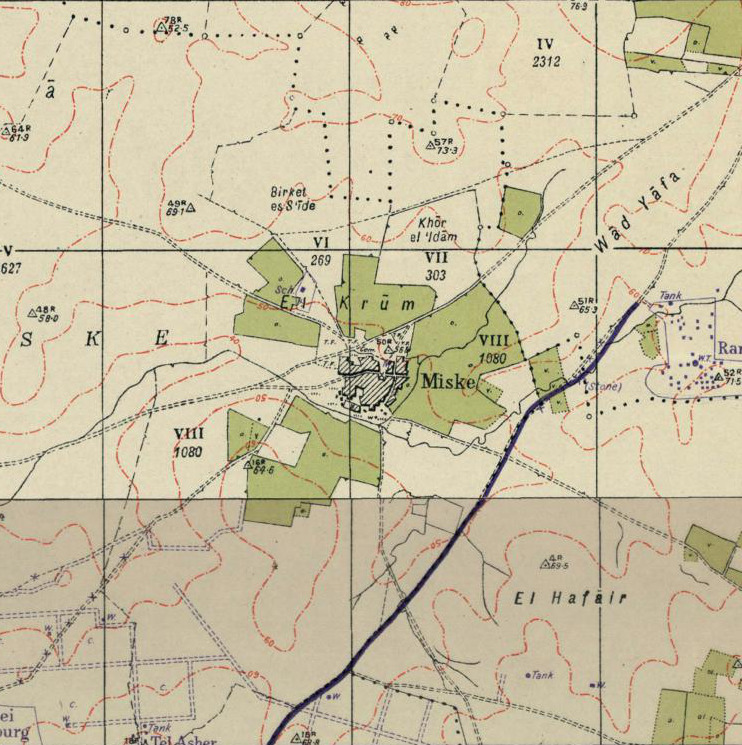
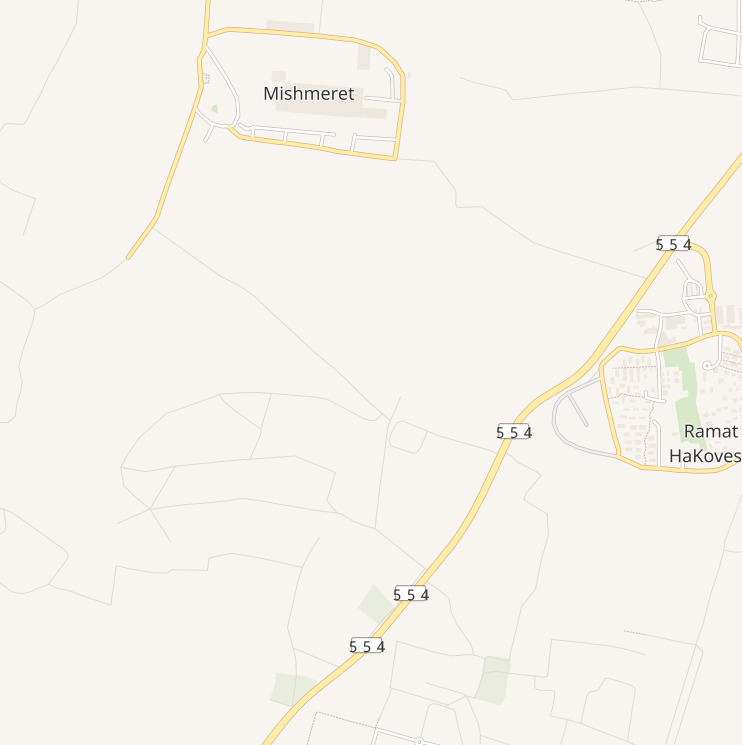
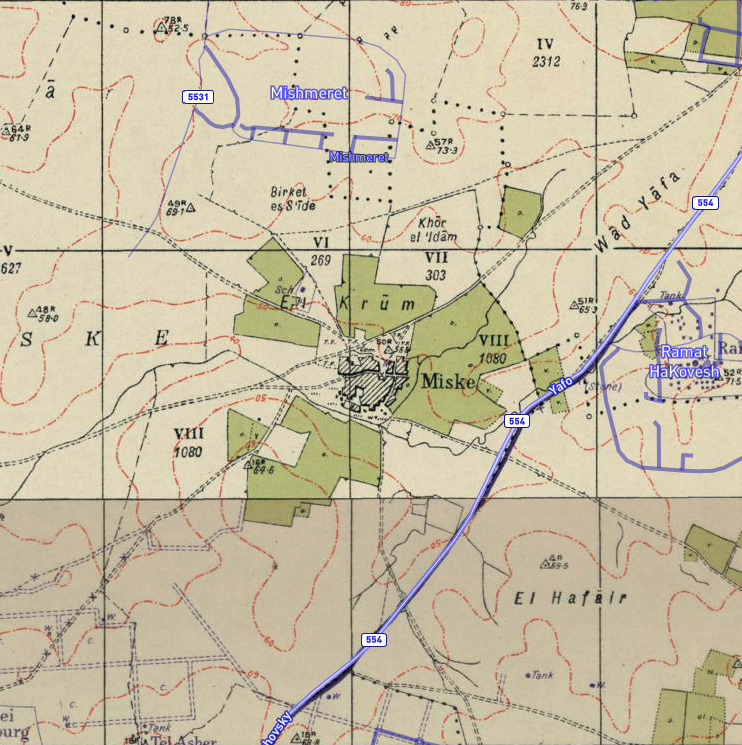
- 1870s map 1940s map modern map 1940s with modern overlay map A series of historical maps of the area around Miska, Tulkarm (click the buttons)

- Location within Mandatory Palestine
- Coordinates: 32°13′04″N 34°55′29″E
- Palestine grid: 143/180
- Geopolitical entity: Mandatory Palestine
- Subdistrict: Tulkarm
- Date of depopulation: 15 April 1948

Area
  - Total: 8,076 dunams (8.076 km^{2}; 3.118 sq mi)

Population (1948)
  - Total: 880
- Cause(s) of depopulation: Expulsion by Yishuv forces
- Current Localities: Sde Warburg, Mishmeret

Miska (Arabic: مسكة), also pronounced as Miski, was a Palestinian village, located fifteen kilometers southwest of Tulkarm, depopulated in 1948.

== History ==
Miska was founded by descendants of the Arabian tribe of Miskain during the 7th century Islamic conquest of Palestine.

According to the Arab geographer Yaqut, writing in the 1220s, Miska was known for its fruit, especially the misk (musk) apple variety which was said to have been transferred to Egypt by the Fatimid vizier Abu Muhammad al-Yazuri, who died in 1058.

=== Ottoman era ===
The French commander Jean Baptiste Kléber and his troops passed by the village on their way to Napoleon's siege of Acre in 1799. Pierre Jacotin named the village Meski on his map from the same campaign.

In the 1860s, the Ottoman authorities granted the village an agricultural plot of land called Ghabat Miska in the former confines of the Forest of Arsur (Ar. Al-Ghaba) in the coastal plain, west of the village.

In 1870, Victor Guérin visited and estimated that the population of Miskeh was 300. He further noted that "In the court of the medhafeh (guest-house) I saw a column and a marble chapter, apparently of Byzantine work. Round the houses are gardens, planted principally with fig-trees, among which here and there rise palms."

In 1870/1871 (1288 AH), an Ottoman census listed the village in the nahiya (sub-district) of Bani Sa'b.

In 1882, the PEF's Survey of Western Palestine (SWP) described Miska an adobe village of small size, with olives to the north and south, and a well to the south.

=== British Mandate era ===
In the 1922 census of Palestine conducted by the British Mandate authorities, Meskeh had a population of 443; all Muslims, increasing in the 1931 census to 635, still all Muslim, in a total of 123 houses.

In the 1945 statistics the population of Miska and Sde Warburg was 880 Arabs and 180 Jews, while the total land area was 8,076 dunams, according to an official land and population survey. Of this, Arabs used 1,115 dunams for citrus and bananas, 304 dunams for plantations and irrigable land, 3,245 for cereals, while 88 dunams were classified as built-up areas.

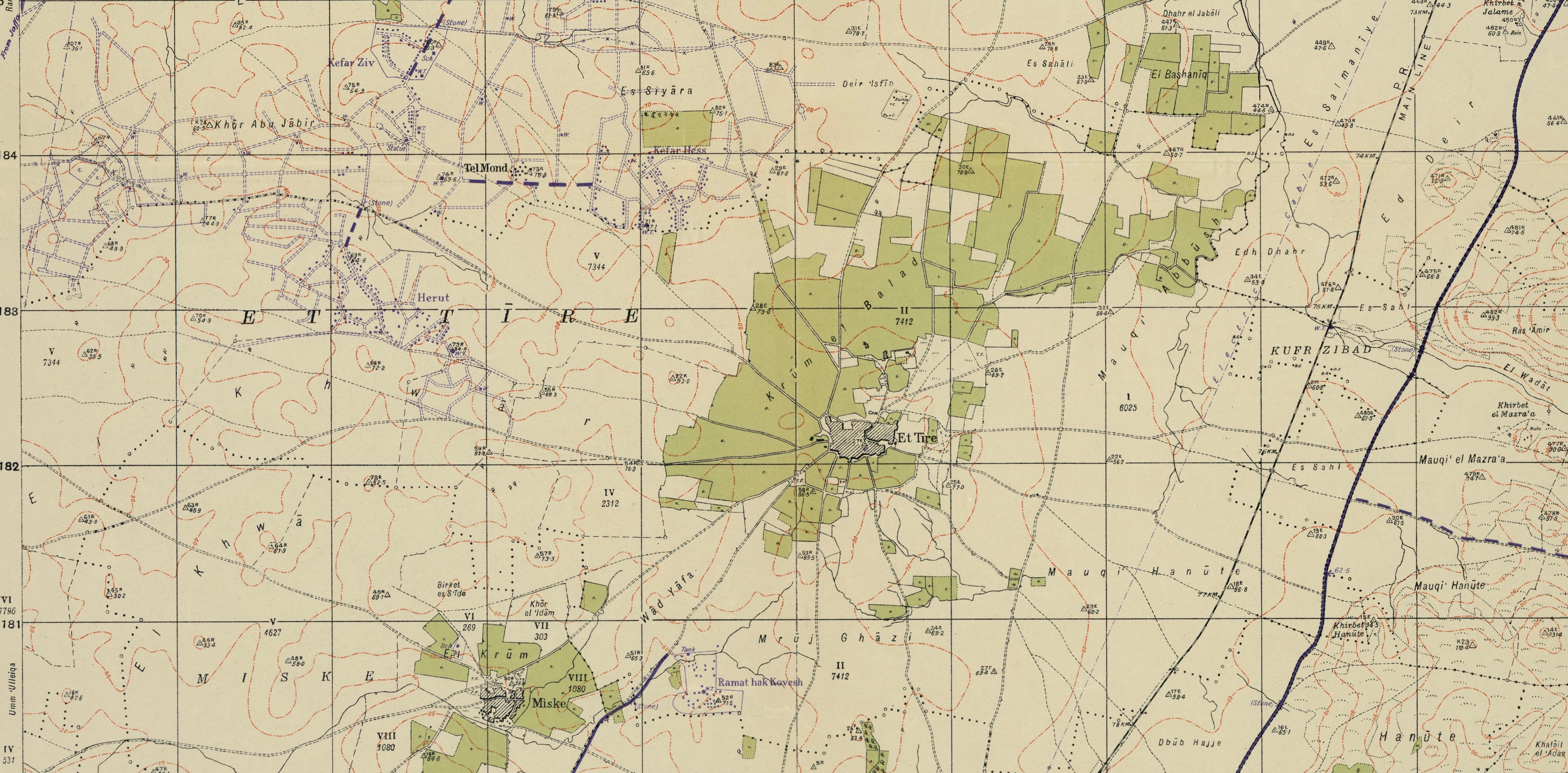
Miska (Miske) 1942 1:20,000

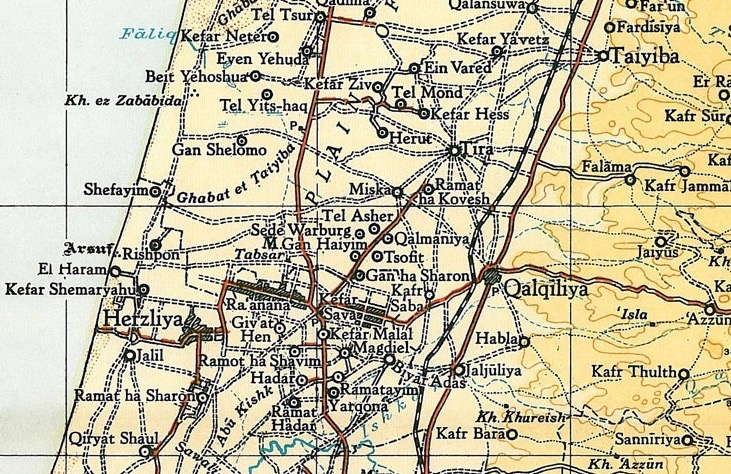
Miska 1945 1:250,000

=== 1948 and after ===
On 15 April 1948, Miska's Arab inhabitants were expelled on the order of the Haganah, the primary Jewish force prior to the outbreak of the 1948 Arab–Israeli War. The village, with the exception of a boy's elementary school and a mosque, was destroyed on the orders of Yosef Weitz, a Jewish National Fund official.

On 16 June 1948, David Ben-Gurion, almost certainly based on a progress report from Yosef Weitz, noted Miska as one of the Palestinian villages that they had destroyed.

Sde Warburg was established in 1938 on land that traditionally belonged to the village. Mishmeret was established in 1946, to the northwest of the village site, on village land. Ramat HaKovesh, founded 1932, is about 1 km due west of the village site, though not on village land.

The Palestinian historian Walid Khalidi described the village in 1992: "The site is covered with citrus groves; cactuses grow along the perimeter of these groves. The two-room school still stands and is used as housing for the watchmen who guard the orchards. The mosque serves as a storehouse for bales of hay and agricultural tools. The large cement fragments of a demolished enclosure built around the village well are visible. Most of the surrounding land has been planted by Israelis with citrus trees."

The school buildings were destroyed by order of the Israel Land Administration in 2006 following commemoration activities at the site organised by Palestinian Citizens of Israel and Israeli NGO Zochrot.

== See also ==
- Depopulated Palestinian locations in Israel

== Bibliography ==
- Barron, J. B., ed. (1923). Palestine: Report and General Abstracts of the Census of 1922. Government of Palestine.
- Conder, C.R.; Kitchener, H.H. (1882). The Survey of Western Palestine: Memoirs of the Topography, Orography, Hydrography, and Archaeology. Vol. 2. London: Committee of the Palestine Exploration Fund.
- Department of Statistics (1945). Village Statistics, April, 1945. Government of Palestine.
- Guérin, V. (1875). Description Géographique Historique et Archéologique de la Palestine (in French). Vol. 2: Samarie, pt. 2. Paris: L'Imprimerie Nationale.
- Hadawi, S. (1970). Village Statistics of 1945: A Classification of Land and Area ownership in Palestine. Palestine Liberation Organization Research Center.
- Karmon, Y. (1960). "An Analysis of Jacotin's Map of Palestine" (PDF). Israel Exploration Journal. 10 (3, 4): 155–173, 244–253. Archived from the original (PDF) on 2019-12-22.
- Khalidi, W. (1992). All That Remains: The Palestinian Villages Occupied and Depopulated by Israel in 1948. Washington D.C.: Institute for Palestine Studies. ISBN 0-88728-224-5.
- Mills, E., ed. (1932). Census of Palestine 1931. Population of Villages, Towns and Administrative Areas. Jerusalem: Government of Palestine.
- Morris, B. (2004). The Birth of the Palestinian Refugee Problem Revisited. Cambridge University Press. ISBN 0-521-00967-7.
- Palmer, E.H. (1881). The Survey of Western Palestine: Arabic and English Name Lists Collected During the Survey by Lieutenants Conder and Kitchener, R. E. Transliterated and Explained by E.H. Palmer. Committee of the Palestine Exploration Fund.
- Pappe, I. (1999). The Israel/Palestine Question. Routledge. ISBN 0-415-16947-X.
