= List of Palestinian rocket attacks on Israel in 2019 =

This is a list of Palestinian rocket and mortar attacks on Israel in 2019. All of the attacks originated in the Gaza Strip, unless stated otherwise. This list does not include reports of deaths and injuries caused by Hamas rocket and mortar attacks that fell within Gaza.

== March ==
On 14 March 2019, two rockets were launched from the Gaza Strip towards Tel Aviv. The incident was the first rocket strike against Tel Aviv since the 2014 Israel–Gaza conflict. One rocket was intercepted by the Iron Dome.

On 25 March 2019, a rocket was launched from Gaza and hit a house in Mishmeret injuring seven people. The rocket was probably a domestically produced J80 rocket, and flew some 120 kilometers from Rafah in the south of Gaza to Mishmeret, along with incendiary balloons.

== May ==
During the first week of May, 600 rockets were fired at Israel by Hamas or other terrorist organizations. The escalations started after 50 rockets were fired at Israel from Gaza on 4 May. Three Israelis were killed by the rockets and more than 100 Israeli civilians were injured.

== June ==
Following five weeks of quiet, a barrage of incendiary balloons on 12 June sparked 6 wildfires and damaged farmlands. Another balloon carried a bomb which exploded over an Israeli city but didn't cause injuries. In response, Israel announced a naval closure that would prevent fishermen from sailing out of Gaza. In retaliation the following night, several missiles were launched from Gaza: one was intercepted by Iron Dome over a city in the Eshkol Region, while a later missile during the day struck a yeshivah in Sderot and caused major damage but no injuries. Israel then bombed a Hamas underground facility in the southern Gaza Strip.

== September ==
Seven Palestinian civilians were wounded after a rocket was launched from Gaza Strip that fell short, hitting a house in the Strip.

== November ==
On 12 November, the Palestinian Islamic Jihad (PIJ) fired 190 rockets into Israel from the Gaza Strip, including long-range rockets fired towards Tel Aviv, leading to several civilians being wounded. This was in response to the targeted killing by Israel of senior PIJ commander Baha Abu al-Ata in Gaza. In response, Israel carried out airstrikes and artillery shelling in the Gaza Strip, killing and wounding several militants as well as civilians.

One of the rockets hit Palestinian Independent Commission for Human Rights (ICHR) in Gaza after going astray from the launcher.
