= 2019 Beirut drone crash =

- Part of Iran–Israel proxy conflict and the Hezbollah–Israel conflict
- Type: Loitering munition
- Location: Dahieh, Beirut, Lebanon; 33.886944°N 35.513056°E
- Date: 25 August 2019
- Executed by: Israel (alleged by Lebanon); Iran (alleged by Israel)
- Outcome: Hezbollah Media Center damaged
- Location of Beirut in Lebanon

Lebanese and Hezbollah officials reported that at 2:30 a.m. local time (23:30 GMT) on 25 August 2019, two drones crashed into the Dahieh district of Beirut, Lebanon. According to Lebanese officials, Israel launched a drone attack. Hezbollah denied exploding or targeting the drones. It was the first such incident between Israel and Lebanon since the 2006 Lebanon War.

== Background ==
In July 2019 Israel targeted the Iranian-backed Popular Mobilization Forces (PMF) bases in Iraq. Several Iraqi, Iranian and Israeli officials have attributed the attacks to Israel, but Israel initially did not confirm nor deny its role. Israeli Prime Minister Benjamin Netanyahu hinted responsibility for the attacks on 20 August 2019, claiming that "Iran is not immune anywhere". Israel confirmed responsibility for the strikes on 22 August 2019, which was later followed by a US confirmation.

A senior researcher at the Israeli Institute for National Security Studies stated that an upcoming election and indications that the United States may start talks with Iran, could be reasons why Israel had "stepped up the pressure".

== Reaction ==
The Israeli military said it does not comment on "foreign reports".

Hezbollah leader Hassan Nasrallah labeled the attack as a "suicide mission" and announced that other Israeli drones will be targeted over Lebanon.

Ron Ben-Yishai reported for Ynet that the drones were Iranian-made, apparent by their models.

Amos Harel, writing for Haaretz, stated that the attack was attributed to Israel and damaged an Iranian-supplied planetary mixer used for making "propellants that can improve the engine performance of missiles and increase their accuracy." The Guardian cites sources saying that Israel sent the drones to "disrupt efforts by Hezbollah to fit advanced guidance systems to rudimentary rockets."

== Aftermath ==
Israeli jets made low altitude flights over Sidon, according to the Lebanese National News Agency. Hezbollah leader Hassan Nasrallah said he would down Israeli drones over Lebanon skies from now on. Lebanese Prime Minister Saad Hariri said the drones amounted to an open attack on the country's sovereignty.

According to the Lebanese National News Agency, Israeli aircraft attacked a PFLP-GC base in Qousaya Lebanon the following day.

== See also ==
- Hezbollah
