= 2019 Tel Aviv rocket strike =

- Part of: Israeli–Palestinian conflict; Gaza–Israel conflict
Date	March 14, 2019
Location	Tel Aviv, Israel

A rocket strike occurred on March 14, 2019, when two rockets were launched from the Gaza Strip towards Tel Aviv. The incident was the first rocket strike against Tel Aviv in the Israeli–Palestinian conflict since the 2014 Gaza war.

At 21:07 IST on Thursday, March 14, 2019, two long-range rockets (Note: The Jerusalem Post describes the projectiles as "two missiles".) were launched from the Gaza Strip towards Tel Aviv. Sirens began blaring and the missile defense system, Iron Dome, was activated to intercept the rockets. The Israel Defense Forces originally reported that one of the rockets was intercepted but later acknowledged that neither of the rockets were shot down and landed in unpopulated areas. The Israel Police found the remnants of a rocket in Holon, a city near Tel Aviv. No casualties or damage to property was reported. Israel later reported that the two rockets were mistakenly launched.

A few hours after the strike, Israel announced the launch of counter strikes in the Gaza Strip. The Israeli military was focused on the town of Khan Yunis located 24 kilometres (15 miles) south of Gaza City. Israel reported that it attacked 100 targets which the military said included "an underground rocket manufacturing site and drone development center." Four people were injured in the attack. Hamas had evacuated its buildings in expectation of an Israeli retaliatory attack.

Following the Israeli counter strike the next day, six more rockets were launched from Gaza towards towns along the border. The Iron Dome was able to intercept five of the rockets in this volley.

The fighting subsided by 08:00 IST Friday, March 15. However, organizers of the Gaza border demonstrations, March of Return, announced that the day's protests were canceled due to safety concerns. This was the first time the weekly demonstrations were cancelled since they began on March 30, 2018.

Less than two weeks later, on 25 March 2019, a rocket was launched from Gaza and hit a house northeast of Tel Aviv in Mishmeret. 7 family members including a sixty year old woman who suffered blast injuries, minor burns and shrapnel wounds, a 12-year old girl and two babies. As a result of the missile, Netanyahu cut short his visit to Washington.
