= 2019 Israeli airstrikes in Iraq =

Airstrikes by Israel against Iran-aligned forces in Iraq

- Part of the Iran–Israel proxy conflict
Date	19 July – 22 September 2019 (2 months and 3 days)
Location	Iraq

Belligerents
Israel	(Iraq) PMF; Iran (IRGC)

Strength
F-35I Adir (Alleged by Israel); IAI Harop(alleged by Iran)	Unknown

Casualties and losses
None	47 killed 2 injured
- 1 civilian killed 29 civilians injured

Location of the airstrikes in Iraq

During the 2019 Israeli airstrikes in Iraq, Israel bombed of Iranian-backed Popular Mobilization Forces (PMF) bases in Iraq starting on 19 July 2019. The strikes targeted Iranian proxy groups and IRGC operatives.

== Timeline ==
=== Amirli strike ===
On 19 July 2019 drones bombed a base near Amirli, Iraq, belonging to the Iranian-backed Popular Mobilization Forces. An airstrike targeting a base housing advisers from Iran and Lebanon wounded two Iranians, while a second strike hit a weapons depot, causing a large fire and the destruction of several ballistic missiles. Iran confirmed on July 30 that the attack killed senior Islamic Revolutionary Guard Corps (IRGC) commander Abu Alfazl Sarabian.

=== Camp Ashraf strike ===
On 27 July, Camp Ashraf, one of the biggest bases in Iraq, was attacked by what Iraqi military sources described as one or more Israeli Air Force jets. The attack struck a consignment of ballistic missile launchers and living quarters of IRGC officers and PMF personnel. Some sources reported that up to 40 people were killed in the attack. According to Iraqi and Iranian sources the attacks were carried out by Israeli F-35 aircraft.

=== Southern Baghdad strike ===
Explosions rocked a PMF weapons depot in southern Baghdad on 12 August killing one and injuring 29 civilians. A spokesman for Iraq's Interior Minister said that an examination of the warehouse showed that the explosion was not caused by an internal failure but by a third party that attacked the warehouse and caused a fire.

Iraq closed its airspace to all unauthorized flights on 13 August, including to the US coalition. Iraqi Prime Minister also ordered all military camps and munitions warehouses to be moved outside Iraqi cities following the explosions that killed one civilian and wounded 29.

=== 30th Brigade's headquarters strike ===
On 17 August, unidentified warplanes targeted the 30th Brigade's headquarters, which is affiliated with the Popular Mobilization Forces.

=== Balad strike ===
Blasts hit a PMF arms depot on 20 August close to the Balad Air Base. A PMF source said the arms depot was specifically targeted by an aerial bombardment.

=== Al-Qa'im ===
On 25 August 2019 a PMF convoy was hit by two drones near the Syrian–Iraqi border town of Al-Qa'im, killing six, including a senior commander. PMF blamed Israel for the attack. It came as Hezbollah leader Hassan Nasrallah was making a speech in response to an alleged Israeli attack at their stronghold in Dahieh, Lebanon.

=== Hit strike ===
On 10 September, loud explosions were reported at a warehouse near the city of Hit in Al Anbar Governorate, northwest of Baghdad. Sky News Arabic reported that after the blast, shells were launched into neighboring areas, indicating an arms depot may have been hit. Al-Arabiya also reported that the warehouse was used to store weaponry and belonged to the Popular Mobilization Forces. al-Arabiya quoted an Iraqi officer claiming there was a drone in the area at the time of the explosions. As result of the explosions, 21 Iraqi militants of the Popular Mobilization Forces were killed.

=== Tafuf Brigade strike ===
On 22 September, violent explosions caused by airstrikes took place at a base belonging to "Liwa al-Tafuf" 13th Brigade of the Popular Mobilisation Units. An Iraqi security official told The New Arab that drones may have been used in the attack.

== Responsibility ==
On 22 August 2019 Israeli Prime Minister Benjamin Netanyahu hinted stated on 20 August 2019 that "Iran is not immune anywhere". On 22 August, Netanyahu, confirmed that Israel had been carrying out operations against Iran in Iraq, saying "We are working against Iranian consolidation—in Iraq as well." US officials later confirmed that Israel was behind the attacks.

== See also ==
- Operation Opera
- Israeli–Syrian ceasefire line incidents during the Syrian civil war
