= Sde Warburg =

Moshav Shitufi in central Israel

Sde Warburg: שְׂדֵה וַרְבּוּרְג (Hebrew)
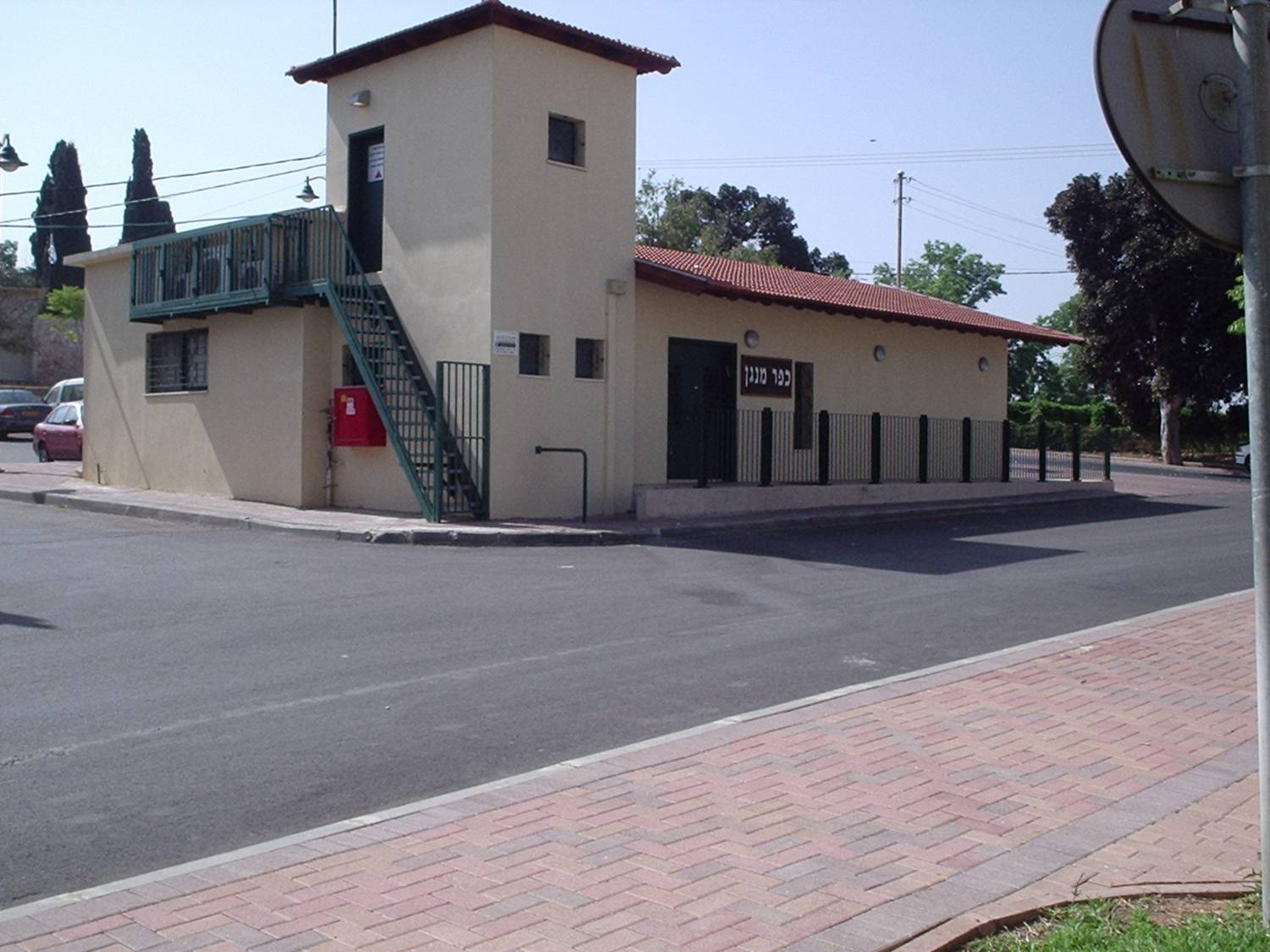
- Etymology: Warburg Field
- Location within Central Israel Location within Israel
- Coordinates: 32°12′13″N 34°54′26″E
- Country: Israel
- District: Central
- Subdistrict: Petah Tikva
- Council: Drom HaSharon
- Affiliation: Agricultural Union
- Founded: 1938
- Population (2024): 1,318

Sde Warburg (Hebrew: שְׂדֵה וַרְבּוּרְג) is a moshav shitufi in central Israel. Located to the north of Kfar Saba, it falls under the jurisdiction of Drom HaSharon Regional Council. In 2024 it had a population of 1,318.

== History ==
Before the 20th century the area formed part of the Forest of Sharon. It was an open woodland dominated by Mount Tabor Oak, which extended from Kfar Yona in the north to Ra'anana in the south. The local Arab inhabitants traditionally used the area for pasture, firewood and intermittent cultivation. The intensification of settlement and agriculture in the coastal plain during the 19th century led to deforestation and subsequent environmental degradation.

The moshav was established in 1938 as a Tower and Stockade settlement by immigrants from Germany and was named after Botanist and Zionist leader Otto Warburg.

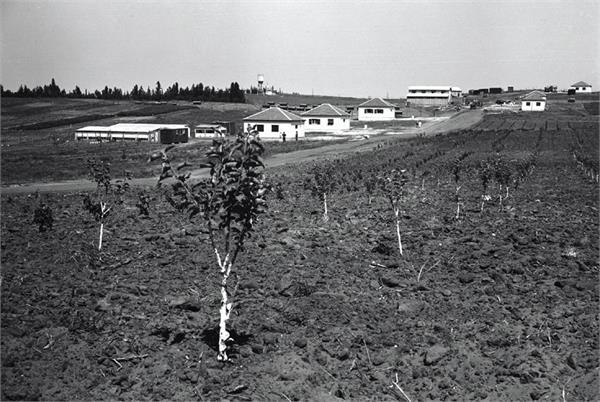
Sde Warburg 1938

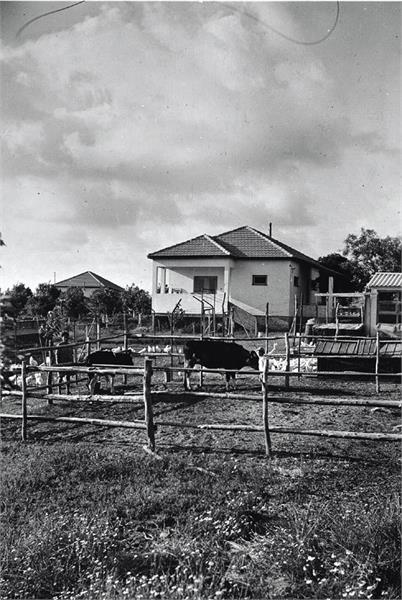
Sde Warburg 1943

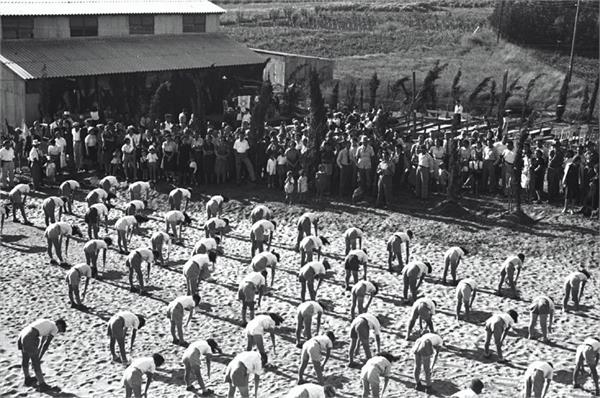
Sde Warburgh 5th anniversary celebrations 1943

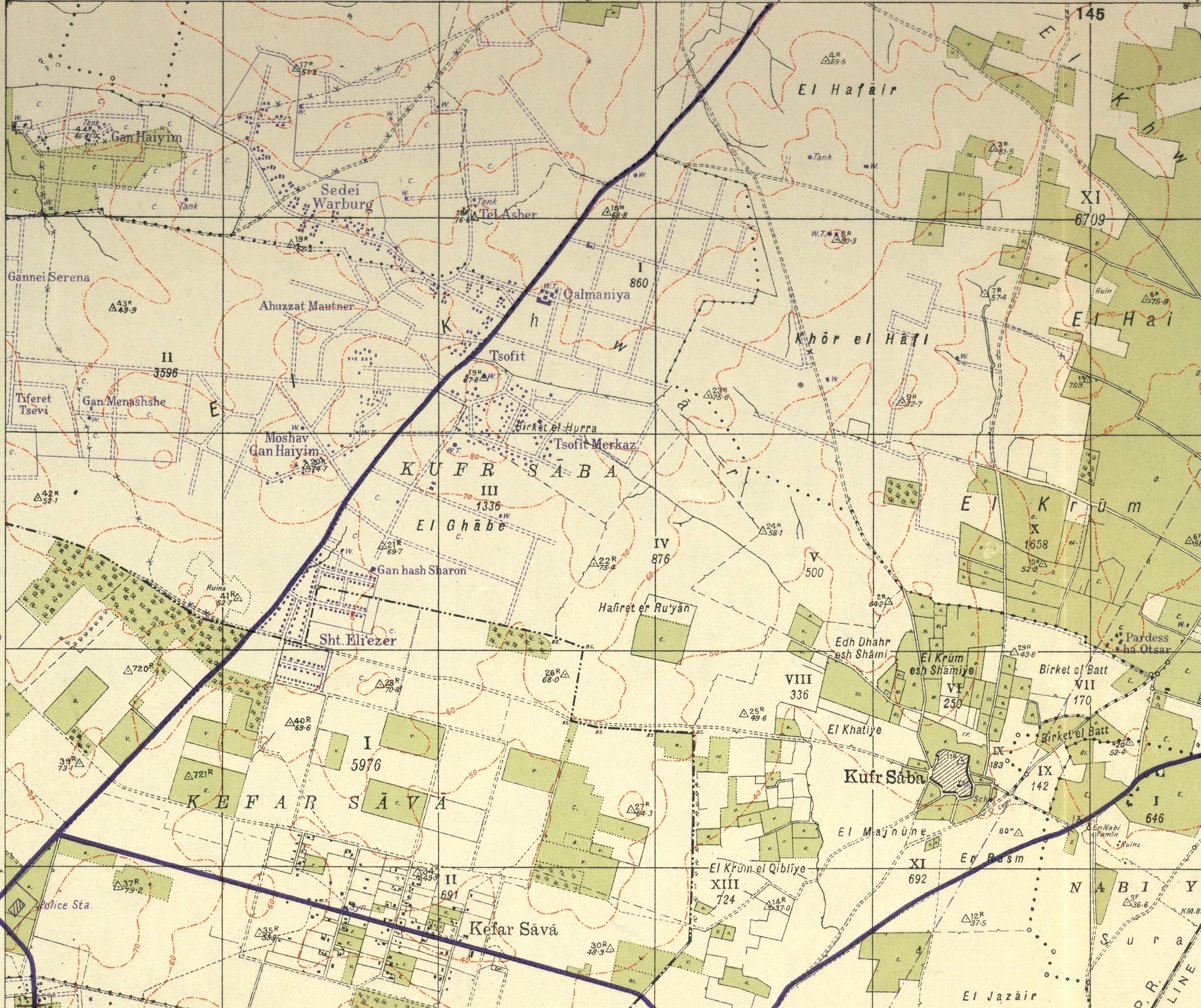
Sde Warburg (Sedie Warburg) 1942 1:20,000

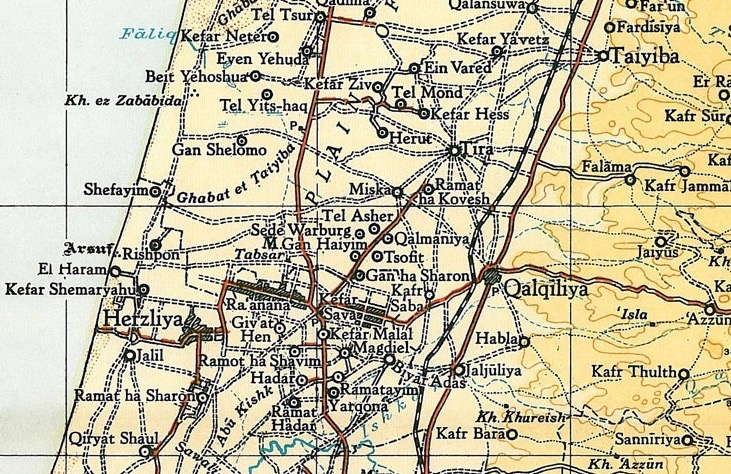
Sde Warburg (Sede Warburg) 1945 1:250,000

== World record ==
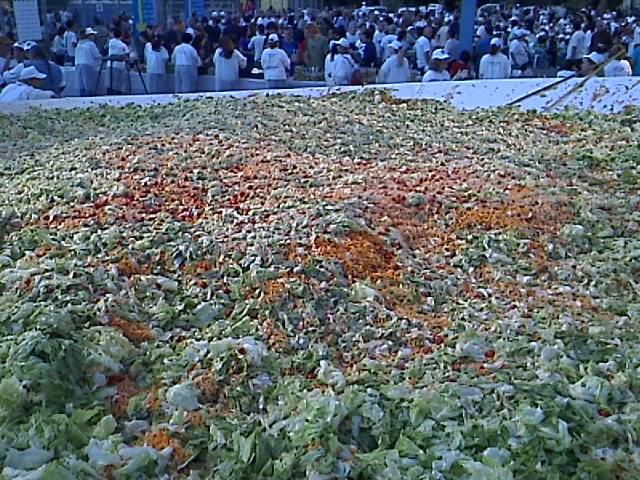
World's largest lettuce salad

Sde Warburg held the Guinness World Record for the largest lettuce salad, weighing 10,260 kg. The event, held on 10 November 2007, was part of the 70th anniversary celebration of the founding of the moshav. The salad was sold to participants and onlookers alike for 10 NIS per bowl, raising 100,000 NIS (over $25,000) to benefit Aleh Negev, a rehabilitative village for young adults suffering from severe physical and cognitive disabilities.
