= Mishmeret =

Moshav in central Israel

Mishmeret: מִשְׁמֶרֶת (Hebrew)
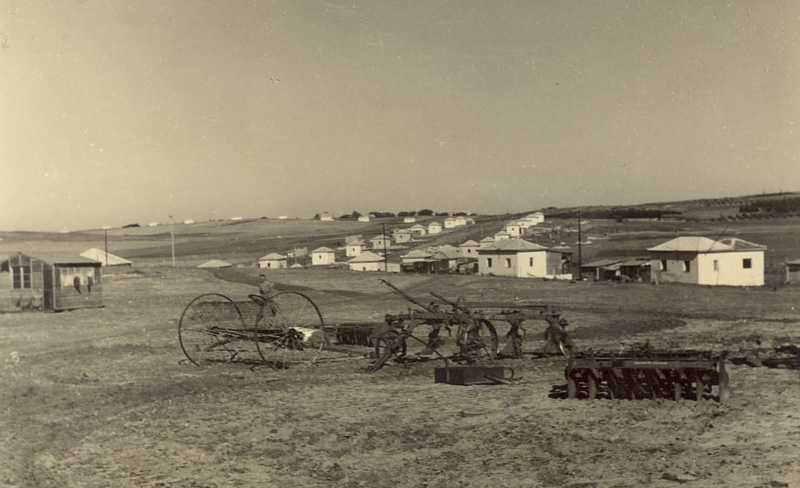
- Mishmeret circa 1951

- Location within Central Israel Location within Israel
- Coordinates: 32°13′43″N 34°55′17″E
- Country: Israel
- District: Central
- Subdistrict: HaSharon
- Council: Lev HaSharon
- Affiliation: Moshavim Movement
- Founded: 1946
- Founder: Demobbed soldiers
- Population (2024): 1,029

Mishmeret (Hebrew: מִשְׁמֶרֶת, lit. 'Position' or 'Post') is a moshav in central Israel. Located in the Sharon plain near Netanya and the HaSharon Junction and covering 3,800 dunams, it falls under the jurisdiction of Lev HaSharon Regional Council. In 2024 it had a population of 1,029.

== History ==
Before the 20th century the area formed part of the Forest of Sharon. It was an open woodland dominated by Mount Tabor Oak, which extended from Kfar Yona in the north to Ra'anana in the south. The local inhabitants traditionally used the area for pasture, firewood and intermittent cultivation. The intensification of settlement and agriculture in the coastal plain during the 19th century, under the Ottoman empire led to deforestation and subsequent environmental degradation.

Mishmeret was founded in 1946 by demobilised soldiers from the British Army near the Arab village of Miska, which was depopulated in April 1948. During the 1948 Arab–Israeli War the community moved to Herut, and was re-established after the war on its present site.

The layout of Mishmeret follows a pattern widespread at the time of its establishment: Homes were built along both sides of the village roads with fields and farmyards behind each one. The Hebrew term is "kfar magevet” (towel village), denoting its elongated shape.

In March 2019 a house in the moshav was hit by a rocket fired from the Gaza Strip.

== Economy ==
Today the moshav farms chickens, flowers, exports sweet potatoes and other vegetables.

In 2015 the Haaretz newspaper cited Mishmeret as an example of a "luxury" moshav.
