= Ibrahim Hamidi =

Syrian journalist

Ibrahim Hamidi ابراهيم حميدي
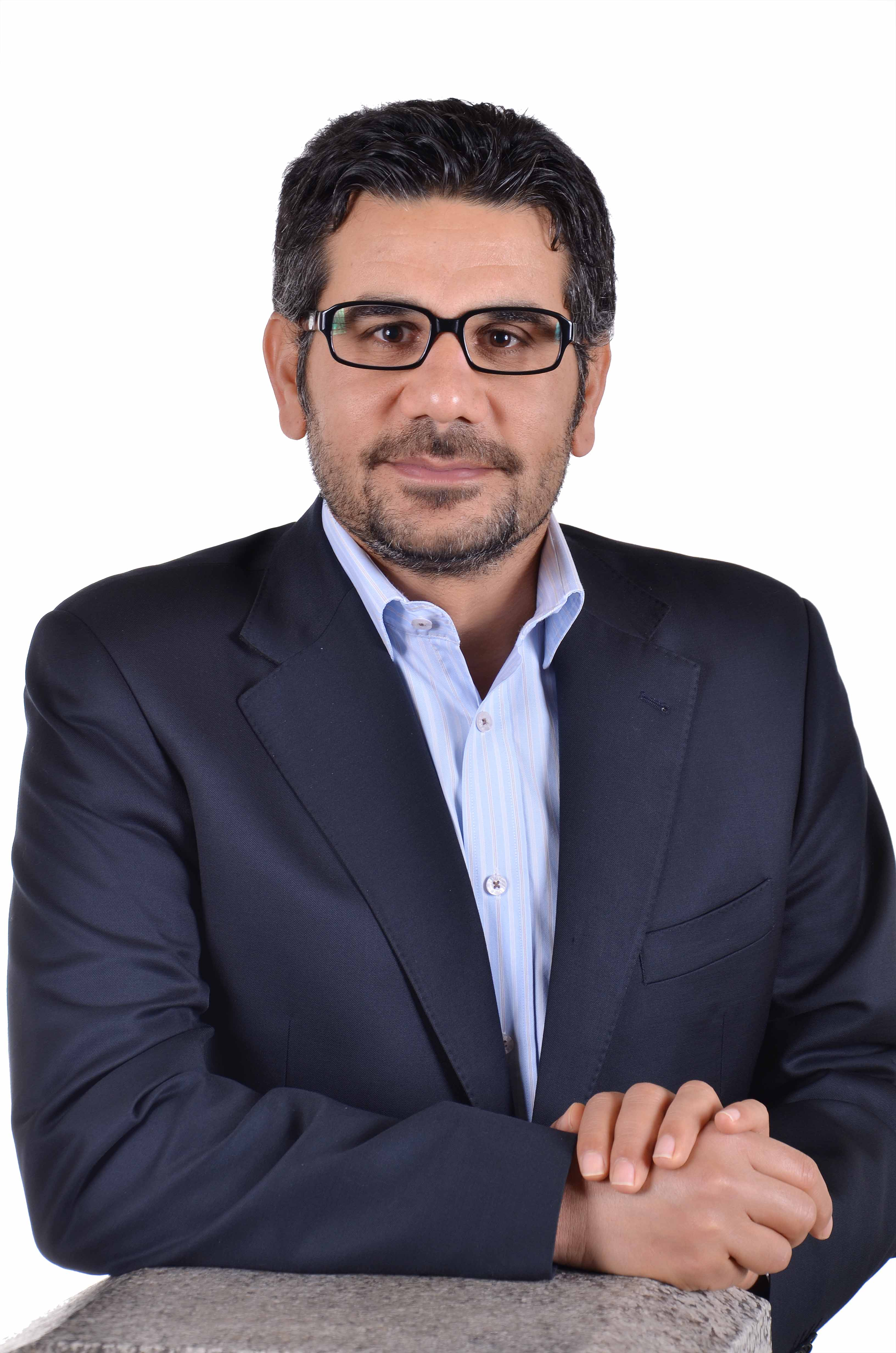
- Born: 1969 (age 56–57); Idlib Governorate, Syria
- Occupation: Journalist
- Writing career
- Subjects: Syria and the Middle East

Ibrahim Hamidi (Arabic: ابراهيم حميدي; also transliterated Ebrahim Humaydi) is a London-based Syrian journalist who is the editor-in-chief for Al Majalla magazine, and a senior diplomatic editor for the Arabic daily Asharq Al-Awsat, and who contributes to severalinternational media outlets and think tanks. Previously, he served as head of the Lebanese Broadcasting Corporation (LBC) office in Damascus, and of the Damascus bureau of Arab daily newspaper Al-Hayat, and as a senior writer for Forward Magazine in Damascus. Hamidi's work focuses on strategic issues in the Middle East, with special insight into Syria's internal and regional politics. He is also a Research Fellow and co-founder of the Syrian Studies Center at the University of St Andrews in Scotland. Hamidi is also a co-founder of the Arab Investigative Journalism Program (ARIJ).

Hamidi is married to writer and novelist Dima Wannous.

== Early life ==
Hamidi was born in 1969 in Idlib Governorate. In 1986, Hamidi was able to move to Damascus to study journalism at Damascus University through a government stipend. His English professor at the time, Abdullah Dardari, was also a correspondent for the London-based Arab daily al-Hayat. Dardari, who later became Deputy Prime Minister of Syria in 2005, helped Hamidi find work as a secretary at his al-Hayat bureau in Damascus.

== Career ==
Hamidi replaced Dardari as al-Hayat correspondent when the latter left to work for the United Nations Development Programme (UNDP). His 1996 coverage of the Arab League Summit in Cairo and the US presidential election, was highly acclaimed and helped bring him to a prominent place between Syrian journalists. Hamidi also delved into the Kurdish issue, interviewing Abdullah Öcalan, leader of the Kurdistan Workers' Party (PKK). Syrian authorities responded by suspending his journalism credentials but he continued to meet and interview Kurdish politicians, most of whom, like Jalal Talbani and Massoud Barzani, rose to power in Iraq after downfall of Saddam Hussein in 2003. Hamidi also conducted interviews with high-profile Palestinian leaders including Fathi Shaqaqi, head of the Islamic Jihad Movement in Palestine who was assassinated in Malta days after his interview with al-Hayat, his successor Ramadan Shalah, and Khaled Mashal, head of the political bureau of Hamas. As an independent correspondent his credentials have been suspended by the Syrian government several times.

Hamidi went on to cover the death of Syrian President Hafez al-Assad and the subsequent inauguration of his son Bashar al-Assad as president. His coverage of the following period, known as the Damascus Spring, and his interviews with Syrian opposition figures earned him the reprimand of the Syrian government and his journalist credentials were suspended several times. In 2002 he reported on Syria's preparations for the Iraq War. The government accused him of spreading "false information" and he was arrested on 23 December 2002. He remained in solitary confinement until 25 May 2003 and was later acquitted in court in 2005.
