= Peter Deutsch =

American politician (born 1957)

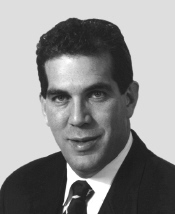

Member of the U.S. House of Representatives from Florida's 20th district
- In office January 3, 1993 – January 3, 2005
- Preceded by: Dante Fascell (redistricted)
- Succeeded by: Debbie Wasserman Schultz

Member of the Florida House of Representatives from the 90th district
- In office November 2, 1982 – November 3, 1992
- Preceded by: Franklin B. Mann
- Succeeded by: John Rayson

Personal details
- Born: Peter Russell Deutsch; April 1, 1957 (age 69) New York City, New York, U.S.
- Party: Democratic
- Spouse: Lori Deutsch
- Children: 2
- Education: Swarthmore College (BA); Yale University (JD)

Peter Russell Deutsch (born April 1, 1957) is an American politician who served as the U.S. representative from Florida's 20th congressional district from 1993 to 2005. Deutsch is a member of the Democratic Party.

== Early life and education ==
Deutsch was born in the borough of the Bronx in New York City in 1957.

He graduated from the Horace Mann School in 1975 and attended Swarthmore College, graduating with a Bachelor of Arts degree in 1979. In college, he worked as an intern for the Senate Judiciary Committee. Deutsch graduated from Yale Law School with a Juris Doctor in 1982.

== Early career ==
After graduating from Yale, Deutsch moved to Broward County, Florida, where he was a lawyer in private practice. He founded the nonprofit Medicare Information Program of Broward County, while working to help Medicare recipients in the area, and served as the group's director during 1982.

=== Florida House of Representatives ===
In 1982, Deutsch was elected for the first of five two-year terms in the Florida House of Representatives, where he wrote legislation protecting seniors from illegal nursing home evictions.

== United States Congress ==
In the 1992 election cycle, Deutsch was elected to the United States House of Representatives. He was reelected in 1994, 1996, 1998, 2000, and 2002. Several times, including in 2000 and 2002, he ran for reelection unopposed. In the House he became the ranking member of the Subcommittee on Oversight and Investigations of the Energy and Commerce Committee, which investigated amongst other things the Enron scandal, the Firestone Tire issue, NIH Conflicts and Martha Stewart’s ImClone stock trading case. Deutsch served from January 3, 1993, to January 3, 2005.

During the Florida election recount after the 2000 presidential election, Deutsch led many of the recount efforts in Broward County and brought the motion to the floor of the Senate to contest the results of the 2000 election, an effort that had been seconded by Alcee Hastings.

== 2004 U.S. Senate race ==
In 2004, Deutsch declared his candidacy for the Democratic nomination for the Senate seat being vacated in 2005 by retiring Democratic Senator Bob Graham. Although Deutsch consistently led opinion polls in the Miami-Fort Lauderdale metropolitan area, and had the largest amount of cash on hand for most of the race, he lagged in statewide opinion polls behind rival Betty Castor, whose fundraising dramatically accelerated during the summer of 2004 with the help of EMILY's List, which contributed close to $4.5 million in television and advertising dollars. The Castor campaign was accused of inappropriate coordination with EMILY's List, and a lawsuit was filed with the Federal Election Commission.

In May 2004, Deutsch hired Roy Teicher, a former television writer, newspaper reporter and editor, as his communications director. In June 2004, he hired Sanford Dickert, CTO for the John Kerry for President Campaign, as his Director of Internet Strategy. In June, he came under heavy criticism from the Castor campaign after American Democracy Project, a 527 group run by Bernie Friedman, began attacking Castor's handling of the Sami al-Arian incident. On March 2, 2006, Al-Arian entered a guilty plea to a charge of conspiracy to help the Palestinian Islamic Jihad, a "specially designated terrorist" organization. He was sentenced to 57 months in prison, and ordered deported following his prison term. Deutsch denied any involvement in the ADP efforts and denounced their tactics in public.

Later in the campaign, Senator Bob Graham and Florida’s other senator Bill Nelson proposed a pledge between Castor, Deutsch, and Alex Penelas to refrain from negative campaigning; Deutsch agreed to the pledge, but added a clause allowing him to raise "legitimate" electability issues. Deutsch released an ad questioning the veracity of Castor's statements on the investigation and suspension of al-Arian.

Deutsch was defeated by Castor in the Democratic primary on August 31, winning only three counties (Miami-Dade, Broward, and Monroe). Castor went on to lose the Senate election to Republican nominee Mel Martinez. Deutsch was unable to run for reelection to the House because of his Senate campaign, and was succeeded by the new Democratic candidate, Debbie Wasserman Schultz.

== Post-congressional career ==
In the 2024 Presidential election, Deutsch endorsed Republican Donald Trump. The announcement was made during a call by the Trump campaign marking the one year anniversary of the October 7 Hamas attack on Israel. Deutsch said the former president's stance on foreign affairs was the deciding issue for him, although he also expressed agreement with his stance on immigration and school choice.

== Personal life ==
Deutsch currently resides in Ra'anana, Israel, with his family. However, he has not taken Israeli citizenship, does not speak Hebrew, and frequently visits Florida. He also founded Ben Gamla Charter School in Hollywood, Florida. Deutsch and his wife Lori have two children.

== Electoral history ==
Florida's 20th congressional district: Results 1992–2002
| Year | Democrat | Votes | Pct | Republican | Votes | Pct | | 3rd Party | Party | Votes | Pct |
|---|---|---|---|---|---|---|---|---|---|---|---|
| 1992 | Peter Deutsch | 130,959 | 55% | Beverly Kennedy | 91,589 | 39% | | James M. Blackburn | Independent | 15,341 | 6% |
| 1994 | Peter Deutsch | 114,623 | 61% | Beverly Kennedy | 72,525 | 39% | | | | | |
| 1996 | Peter Deutsch | 159,256 | 65% | Jim Jacobs | 85,777 | 35% | | | | | |
| 1998 | Peter Deutsch | ** | | (no candidate) | | | | | | | |
| 2000 | Peter Deutsch | 156,765 | 100% | (no candidate) | | | * | | | | |
| 2002 | Peter Deutsch | ** | | (no candidate) | | | | | | | |

Write-in and minor candidate notes: In 2000, write-ins received 187 votes.

**According to Florida law, no totals need be submitted when there is no opposition.

== See also ==
- List of Jewish members of the United States Congress

U.S. House of Representatives
| New constituency | Member of the U.S. House of Representatives from Florida's 20th congressional district 1993–2005 | Succeeded by Debbie Wasserman Schultz |
U.S. order of precedence (ceremonial)
| Preceded by Dan Kildee as Former U.S. Representative | Order of precedence of the United States as Former U.S. Representative | Succeeded by Robert Wexler as Former U.S. Representative |
