= List of Palestinian rocket attacks on Israel in 2007 =

The following is a list of rocket and mortar attacks on Israel in 2007 by Hamas and other Palestinian militants from the Gaza Strip. 2007 marked the beginning of Palestinian militants' firing of Katyusha rockets at Israeli cities, previously practiced only by Lebanese militant group Hezbollah. A total of 2,807 rockets and mortars were fired at Israel in 2007.

== March ==
March 18, 2007
al-Quds Brigades Palestinians fire five Qassam rockets from the Gaza Strip to Israel in three different barrages after a relative period of calm. One of the rockets landed in Ashkelon's southern industrial zone, near a strategic facility. The rest of the rockets landed south of Ashkelon and in open areas in the western Negev. There were no reports of injuries.

== May ==
May 16, 2007
Thirty Qassam rockets were fired at the Western Negev, leaving two residents of Sderot injured. Ten others suffered from shock.
May 17, 2007
Two people in Sderot were slightly injured by one of the ten rockets that landed on Israeli territory. In response to these attacks, an Israeli air attack against a Hamas security building killed at least one Hamas militant and injured more than 40.
May 18, 2007
In a Qassam rocket attack on Sderot three people were injured. Twenty rockets were fired at a kibbutz in Sderot. In response, an Israeli air strike on a Hamas building killed at least five Hamas members.
May 20, 2007
Ten rockets were fired from Gaza with four landing in southern Israel, but no injuries were reported, according to an Israeli spokesman, whilst an Israeli strike killed eight members of Khalil al-Hayya's family and one other, and injured at least 15 others.
May 21, 2007
Shir-El Feldman, 32, was killed and two others wounded in a Qassam rocket strike on Sderot.
A first round of five rockets were fired towards Sderot, one striking the city, two landing south of Ashkelon, and two striking the western Negev. A Qassam rocket that struck Sderot killed an Israeli woman, the first fatality from a rocket attack in the country since November. Another man was moderately injured from the attack. The rocket struck a commercial center near a bakery in Sderot. Israeli civilians burned tires in the street after the attack, though the protest was interrupted by the Red Dawn rocket early-warning siren.
A second round of three rockets was later fired towards Israel, which landed near a kibbutz in the western Negev. A third series launched two more rockets towards Israel. No injuries were reported from these further attacks.
May 22, 2007
Hamas militants say that they have fired several rockets towards Israel, a total of ten, according to various groups. A total of seven rockets landed in western Negev, but caused no injuries.
May 23, 2007
Militants fired eight rockets at southern Israel, but no injuries were reported. One rocket that was fired, landed in an open area of Sderot. No injuries or damage were reported from the rocket landing. Later, two rockets hit the Sderot area, one of them inside the city. One woman suffered from shock after the attack. Two more rockets landed south of Ashkelon, one of which killed a horse in Kibbutz Nir Am.
A total of nine Qassam rocket were fired from Gaza, by Palestinians, towards the Israeli western Negev. Two of the rockets landed near kibbutzim in the area of Eshkol Regional Council, and the rest landed near Sderot and the area of Sha'ar HaNegev Regional Council. After one of the rockets landed, a fire broke out close to one of the kibbutzim. Some of these rockets landed in Israel without warning, due to a malfunction in the Red Dawn system that notifies of incoming rocket fire.
May 24, 2007
In the northern Gaza Strip, a mortar was fired towards Israel. The mortar round landed near the Erez Crossing. No injuries were reported, but the structure was somewhat damaged.
May 25, 2007
Seven Qassam rockets were fired towards Israel's western Negev from the Gaza Strip. The first five Qassams landed in open areas close to the southern town of Sderot and south of Ashkelon. No casualties were reported from these, though a wheat field near Sderot caught fire due to a Qassam landing. Two rockets were later fired towards the Israeli town of Sderot. One of them landed near a house inside the town. This Qassam lightly wounded four people from shrapnel, and ten other nearby residents suffered from shock. The other rocket landed in Sderot's industrial area, damaging some equipment in a facility.
May 26, 2007
Five Qassam rockets were fired at Israel from the Gaza Strip, though no people were injured.
May 27, 2007
Two Qassam rockets landed in Sderot, Israel. Oshri Oz, 36, was killed when a Qassam rocket struck near his car and fatally wounded him. The Qassam hit the street, it caused shrapnel to hit Oshri Oz's car, and he crashed into a wall. He got out of the car, but died of his wounds at Barzilay Medical Center in Ashkelon. One other man was wounded and other residents suffered from shock. Another Qassam rocket later hit Sderot injuring one Israeli civilian.
May 28, 2007
Seven rockets struck Sderot in southern Israel, but no injuries were reported.
May 29, 2007
Seventeen Qassams hit the Negev, three landed in Sderot. The Popular Resistance Committees and the Democratic Front for the Liberation of Palestine claimed responsibility for the attacks.
May 30, 2007
Six Qassam rockets were fired from the Gaza Strip hit western Negev. One rocket hit a power line and an apartment building in Sderot. Some residents experienced and were treated for shock after the attack. The Qassam also caused a temporary blackout in some parts of the city, because of the hit on the power line. Another apartment building was hit, causing six people to experience shock, though no people were inside at the time. The latter had a claim of responsibility by the militia of the Popular Resistance Committees.
May 31, 2007
Militants in the Gaza Strip fired three Qassam rockets into Israel, but caused no injuries.

== June ==
June 1, 2007
Four Qassam rockets were fired towards Israel from the Gaza Strip. Two of the rockets landed near a Negev kibbutz, causing some damage to a garage. Another rocket hit a kibbutz south of Ashkelon and caused serious damage to a warehouse. The fourth rocket landed in the Gaza Strip.
June 3, 2007
Four IDF soldiers were injured, one moderately and three lightly, near the Erez crossing in the northern Gaza Strip. They were hurt after three mortar rounds hit their location. Hamas claimed responsibility. The injured soldiers, and six who suffered shock, were evacuated to Barzilay Medical Center in Ashkelon. Two other mortar shells landed in other areas of the Gaza Strip.
June 5, 2007
Two Qassam rockets were fired towards Israel from the Gaza Strip. One landed near Sderot and one landed inside the Gaza Strip; neither caused injuries.
June 6, 2007
Hamas fired eight mortar shells at the Erez Crossing, damaging the site, and causing a fire on the Gaza side of the border. Two Israeli trauma centers were opened in southern Israel near Gaza.
June 18, 2007
A Qassam rocket fired from Gaza struck a factory, containing hazardous materials, in Sderot. The attack resulted in a leak of gaseous caustic soda and prompted the response of police, fire-fighting forces, and teams specialized in dealing with hazardous materials who sealed the leak and removed the poisonous materials.
June 20, 2007
Nine Qassam rockets struck the western Negev injuring three with shrapnel and causing shock in at least seven reported cases. In Sderot, rockets damaged two homes and a synagogue. Two of the rockets struck near Kibbutz Nir Am, injuring no one but causing a power outage in the area by damaging a high-tension wire. Islamic Jihad claimed responsibility for four of the rockets.

== July ==
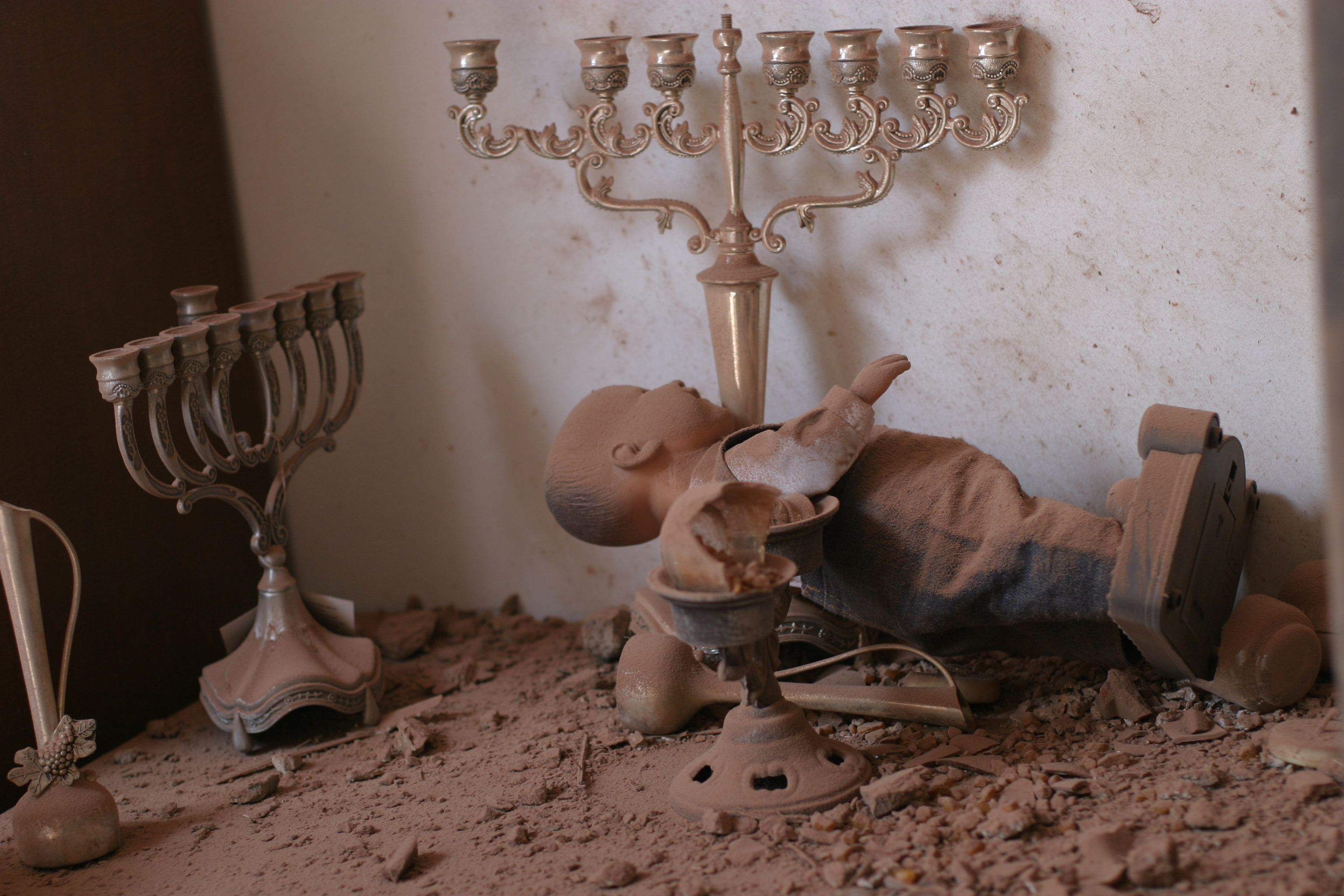
A house in Sderot hit by a Qassam rocket, 2007

July 5, 2007
Three mortars shells and two Qassam rockets were fired into Israel, causing no damage and injures. Hamas and Islamic Jihad both claimed responsibility.
July 8, 2007
Five Qassam rockets struck the Western Negev with three striking near Sapir College. The attack did not result in any reported casualties and caused damage to a building undergoing construction. The Izz ad-Din al-Qassam Brigades, the armed wing of Islamic Jihad Movement in Palestine, claimed responsibility for the attack.
July 8, 2007
Five Qassam rockets were fired into Israel. Four landed in open areas, but one landed near a college in Sderot. Nobody was injured. Islamic Jihad claimed responsibility.
July 9, 2007
Three Qassams were fired into Israel, causing damage but no injuries. Palestinian Islamic Jihad claimed responsibility
July 10, 2007
11 mortar shells were fired into Israeli territory in three separate barrages. Two buildings contained damage, but there were no casualties. One mortar shell landed near the Kerem Shalom Crossing. Palestinian Islamic Jihad claimed responsibility.
July 12, 2007
Despite the presence of Israeli forces in the Gaza Strip, Islamic Jihad managed to fire a Qassam rocket to Sderot. Nobody was injured.
July 19, 2007
Four Qassam rockets struck southern Israel, damaging several buildings and causing five people to suffer from shock - one of whom required hospitalization.
July 26, 2007
More than 10 mortar shells and Qassam rockets were fired at Israel this week, causing some damage and injuring three.

== August ==
August 1, 2007
Four Qassam rockets fired into Israel, causing some damage.
August 4, 2007
Three Qassam rockets were fired at Sderot, injuring three people.
August 6, 2007
A rocket launched from northern Gaza landed in a kindergarten schoolyard in Sderot, moments after the completion of a Monday afternoon meeting between Prime Minister Ehud Olmert and Palestinian President Mahmoud Abbas. The Al-Quds Brigades, the military wing of Islamic Jihad, took credit for the attack, which caused damaged to nearby buildings, including two other kindergartens and a public elementary school. The Red Color system was activated.
August 17, 2007
In a rocket barrage, three Qassams and 13 mortar shells were fired into Israel by the Palestinian Islamic Jihad. No casualties or damage were reported.
August 20, 2007
Six members of the armed wing of Hamas fired Qassams and mortar shells into Israeli territory. They were killed while driving back when their vehicle was blown up by an Israeli missile.
August 21, 2007
Two Qassam rockets were fired into Israel, one hitting a kindergarten, injuring and shocking some people.
August 22, 2007
A Qassam rocket landed in Sderot late in the evening, causing no reported damage or casualties.
August 23, 2007
Eight Qassam rockets hit in the Negev. Two landing in Sderot caused minor injuries, anxiety, and damage to a house.
August 27, 2007
A Qassam rocket was fired into Israeli territory. The launcher was destroyed minutes later by an Israeli missile.
August 28, 2007
A Sderot resident was moderately injured by shrapnel from a Qassam rocket which fell on his house in his bedroom. The rest of the family was hiding in the bomb shelter after the Color Red system was activated. The Al Aqsa Martyrs Brigades claimed responsibility for the attack. Seven other Qassams were fired, causing some damage and two people suffer shock.
August 29, 2007
Four Qassam rockets were fired into Israel.
August 30, 2007
Three Qassam rockets fired by Palestinian militants in the Gaza Strip struck open areas in the western Negev. There was no damage or injuries in either of the attacks.

== September ==
September 3, 2007
Seven Qassam rockets hit in the Negev. One landed in the courtyard of a Sderot day-care center, damaging a building and causing shock to twelve people, including some infants. Islamic Jihad claimed responsibility.
September 10, 2007
Two Qassam rockets were fired at the Zikim Army Base in Israel near the Gazan Border from Beit Hanun. One of them landed safely in the Negev, but the other landed near unfortified barracks (Zikim military base) at the base where Israeli recruits were sleeping. This resulted in at least 66 wounded, with at least 10 moderately to seriously. 69 soldiers were wounded by the rocket; 60+ of them had only light-to moderate shrapnel wounds, but four of them were injured seriously. One of the four had to have his leg amputated, and another was in a critical condition. Both Islamic Jihad and PRC claimed responsibility. Despite Hamas' lack of direct responsibility, they called the act a Victory from God
In retaliation, Israeli choppers flew over the Strip, firing missiles at militant bases, wounding four Islamic Jihad members. The attack harmed both male and female soldiers. Al-Quds Brigades and Islamic Jihad both claimed responsibility for the attacks.
September 18, 2007
Four Qassams rained down on Israeli Gaza border communities. Nobody claimed responsibility.
September 26, 2007
Militants launched more than 12 rockets and 20 mortar shells at Sderot. Hours later, missiles hit a jeep as it crossed a crowded intersection in the Zeitoun neighborhood of Gaza City, killing at least five members of the Army of Islam. The IDF said the jeep was carrying rockets ready for firing.
September 27, 2007
A Qassam launching cell was spotted in the area while Hamas militants were preparing to fire another Qassam rocket. Soldiers opened fire and killed one of them, the rest were able to flee.

== October ==
October 7, 2007
In a rocket barrage fired by Palestinian militants, eight mortar shells, three Qassam rockets and one Katyusha rocket landed inside Israeli territory. One studio was completely burned down by a mortar shell in Kerem Shalom. The Katushya rocket landed 400 meters from Netivot, 11 km away from the Gaza Strip. It was the first rocket to hit the Netivot area. In the previous week ten Qassam rockets and 20 mortar shells hit the Negev. Nobody was injured in the attacks.
October 22, 2007
More than 15 Qassam rockets were fired into Israel on October 21 and 22, according to the IDF.
October 23, 2007
Eleven Qassam rockets and eight mortar shells hit the Negev. At least five struck Sderot, with one hitting an apartment building. The Salah al-Din Brigades claimed responsibility.
October 24, 2007
A rocket barrage hit the Western Negev, with five Qassam rockets and several mortar shells. None of the rockets inflicted injuries, although a house was burnt down and two people suffered from shock in Sderot.
October 25, 2007
Ten Qassam rockets were launched, causing no injuries nor damage.
October 26, 2007
Seven Qassam rockets were fired into Israel. One woman in Sderot suffers from shock.
October 31, 2007
Eight mortar shells were fired into Israel, some of them fired from a school yard. The IAF had them in sight, but could not fire, an IDF statement reported.

== November ==
November 1, 2007
In an unprecedented rocket barrage, eight mortar shells and 13 Qassam rockets were fired at the Western Negev within an hour.
November 4, 2007
Three Qassams were fired into Israel, causing a blackout. Palestinian Islamic Jihad claimed responsibility.
November 15, 2007
Two members of the Fatah-affiliated Al Aqsa Martyrs Brigades were killed by the IAF while launching Qassams.
November 21, 2007
A rocket barrage of five Qassam rockets and 18 mortar shells hit the Western Negev, including several kibbutzim, Sderot and Ashkelon. A woman in Ashkelon was treated for shock.
November 26, 2007
A Hamas operative was killed as he and his cell were launching Qassams at Sderot. Three Qassams landed inside Israeli territory.

== December ==
December 2, 2007
A mortar barrage hits a kibbutz, causing some damage.
December 3, 2007
Three more Hamas fighters were killed while trying to launch mortars near Beit Lahiya. They were killed by Armored Corps soldiers.
Four IDF soldiers were hurt as a mortar shell exploded near their base, in Nahal Oz.
December 5, 2007
Three Hamas militants were killed overnight while launching mortars at Sderot. One of the mortars hit a residential building, causing a woman shock and a lot of damage.
December 12, 2007
About 20 Qassams were lobbed into Israel, lightly injuring three Israeli civilians. 15 people were treated for shock.
December 13, 2007
Two more Qassams were fired into Israel; they moderately injured a woman in Sderot.
Hours after the strike, Israel retaliated with an airstrike in the Gaza Strip, causing three deaths. IDF and Palestinian medics both confirmed all the deaths were militants. Palestinian Islamic Jihad confirmed they lost three of their men, but medics said the three belonged to the small Fatah offshoot which fired two Qassam rockets into Israel hours earlier. Later it became clear that a top commander of the Palestinian Islamic Jihad, Sami Tafesh, was killed together with two members of the launching rocket squad of the Al Aqsa Martyrs Brigades.
December 16, 2007
Shrapnel from a rocket lightly to moderately wounded a two-year-old boy. His mother was treated for shock. The rocket directly hit a house in Kibbutz Zikim.
December 18, 2007
Militants from various Palestinian groups fired at least 15 Qassam rockets and mortars, causing only some damage.
December 20, 2007
Five Qassam rockets struck Israel at open areas near Sderot and Ashkelon. One of the rockets landed in a schoolyard in Sderot, where 12 pupils had to be treated for shock. The Red Color alert was alarmed and children ran to shelter to protect them from shrapnel.
December 31, 2007
A barrage of 14 mortar bombs and one Qassam rocket landed in open areas in the northern and southern Negev. No damage or injuries were sustained.
