= Sabireen Movement =

Palestinian Shi'a Islamist militant group

- Arabic: حركة الصابرين نصراً لفلسطين; Ḥarakah aṣ-Ṣābirīn Naṣran li-Filasṭīn
- Flag used by the group
- Leader: Hisham Salim
- Dates active: 25 May 2014 – March 2019
- Split from: Palestinian Islamic Jihad
- Headquarters: Shuja'iyya, Gaza Strip
- Active regions: Palestinian Territories
- Ideology: Khomeinism; Anti-Zionism
- Wars: the Gaza–Israel conflict
- Website: alsabireen.ps

The Sabireen Movement, officially the Movement of the Patient ones in Support for Palestine – Hisn (Arabic: حركة الصابرين نصراً لفلسطين - حِصن), was a Shiite Palestinian militant group that operated from 15 May 2014 to March 2019.

The movement was formed by a number of Palestinian Islamic Jihad (PIJ) leaders who converted to Shiism and were dissatisfied with the PIJ's leadership and with Hamas's position in the Yemeni Civil War, where it supported the Saudi-led intervention, and the Syrian Civil War, where it supported the opposition. The group was described as an Iranian attempt to replace Hamas with a Shiite movement that shared its stance on Syria, and was added to the American list of Specially Designated Global Terrorist Organizations.

The movement claimed to have expanded into the West Bank in 2016, but it was effectively destroyed by Hamas in 2019, when Hamas arrested its leader, Hisham Salem, and only released him after the movement's members gave up their arms. Salem was granted asylum in Iran, while ordinary members either returned to Sunni Islam and rejoined the PIJ or joined the Shiite Harakat Hezbollah al-Nujaba in Iraq.

== History ==
Inspired by the Fathi Shaqaqi’s works on Islamic Revolution in 1979, the earliest form of the group can be traced back to 2010 as a reformist movement in Gaza calling for a revolution inspired by the Iranian Revolution. While Hamas supported the Syrian rebellion, the Sabireen Movement has praised Iran's involvement as well as Hezbollah's, the group has sent condolences to Hezbollah fighters killed in Syria as well as by Israeli airstrikes against Hezbollah, and has called on the residents of the Yarmouk Camp to fight ISIL's presence in the suburb.

After leaving Palestinian Islamic Jihad and converting to Shia Islam, Salim has called on his followers to do the same and convert and has also encouraged followers who have already become Shia to proselytize in the Gaza Strip. According to the State Department in September 2015 the group fired rockets into Israeli territory, and in January 2016 Salim announced the group had expanded into the West Bank by establishing cells there, the next month in response to the announcement the Palestinian Authority arrested five men in Bethlehem as part of a cell belonging to the group.

In 2015, Hamas denounced the movement as "against the people of Gaza", and interrogated some of its followers. On February 19, an explosive device blasts at the residence of Sheikh Hisham Salem in Beit Lahia, Gaza Strip, resulting in Salem lightly wounded. No one claimed responsibility for the bombing.

In early 2018 the Trump administration designated the group as a Specially Designated Global Terrorist Organization under an executive order. A Washington, DC–based pro-Israel think tank called The Washington Institute for Near East Policy asserted that the group's formation could be a bid by Iran to replace Hamas as a proxy with Sabireen given Hamas' stance on Syria and the religious divide between the two.

In 2019, Hamas arrested more than 70 Sabireen members and confiscated their weapons, effectively ending the existence of the organisation. The reasoning behind such move was that Hamas wanted to maintain peace with Israel, while Sabireen Movement refused any attempts at reconciliations.

In 2021, Tehran Times "alleged" that Hisham Salim was granted asylum in Iran, while ordinary members of the group repented and converted to Sunni Islam and joined Al-Quds Brigades and/or some members had merged with Iraqi Harakat Hezbollah al-Nujaba that operates charity in the Gaza Strip.

== Ideology ==
Upon creation, the movement did not introduce itself as a Shiite movement. Its secretary general says it does not represent a certain sect, stressing that sectarianism only serves the enemies' best interests. He also denies that the movement only consists of Shiites and does not accept Sunni members.

In January 2016, Hisham Salim, founder of the Harakat al-Sabireen, told the Palestinian Ma'an News Agency that the group, like Hezbollah, is directly funded by the Iranian government, but stressed that his group was non-sectarian, non-religious and certainly not a "Shiite movement."
