= American Democracy Project (Florida group) =

American Democracy Project is a 527 group. As of 2006 it was headed by Bernie Friedman and based in Broward County, Florida.

ADP was founded during the 2004 Senate election "to investigate the reasons that the University of South Florida became known as 'Jihad University' in the 1990s during the tenure of then-USF President Betty Castor," then a candidate for the Democratic nomination. Its investigations have centered on Castor's response to USF professors Sami Al-Arian and Ramadan Abdullah Shallah in the mid-1990s. Al-Arian later pleaded guilty to conspiracy to contribute services to or for the benefit of the Palestine Islamic Jihad, a Specially Designated Terrorist organization, and was sentenced to 57 months in prison.

Friedman, a long-time friend of Castor's rival for the Democratic nomination, U.S. Rep. Peter Deutsch, has been accused of using the ADP as a "front group" to stage attacks on Castor on behalf of the Deutsch campaign. Deutsch has denied this accusation.

ADP launched a website in July, castortruth.com, outlining several documents and details that were uncovered after ADP filed their request for documents in Betty Castor's possession.

On the same day, Castor's campaign launched a second website, castorfacts.com, containing documents supporting Castor's claim that she did everything possible to deal appropriately with Al-Arian, while simultaneously debunking Friedman and one of castortruth.com's contributors, John Loftus. Also, castorfacts.com pointed out that Al-Arian had a relationship with George W. Bush during the 2000 presidential campaign, and for some time leading up to the September 11, 2001 attacks: the point was to "show that Republicans can't exploit this issue" in the general election.

== Controversy over ADP's tactics ==
=== Whether ADP was connected to the Deutsch campaign ===
527 groups such as ADP are legally barred from coordinating with political campaigns. However, it was reported that Bernie Friedman and Peter Deutsch were close friends who attend the same synagogue and often had lunch together. The Tampa Tribune went as far as to criticize Deutsch for "trying to hide behind a phony political action group."

Deutsch and Friedman both maintained that they were not coordinating with each other. On July 14, Deutsch stated that he did not approve of the ADP's tactics, but that he could not make ADP stop its attacks because such a request would constitute illegal coordination. Despite Deutsch's statements, several major newspapers in Florida treated ADP as a wing of the Deutsch campaign, and have blamed Deutsch for ADP's actions.

=== Whether ADP's claims were justified ===
Several publications and officials defended Castor:

- On June 29, Senator Bob Graham, who had previously remained outside of the Castor-Deutsch infighting, released a statement that "Betty Castor acted appropriately as President of the University of South Florida to deal with Sami Al-Arian."
- On July 1, the Jewish Journal published an editorial titled "Shame on Deutsch – Castor smeared."
- Also on July 1, the Tallahassee Democrat wrote that "Deutsch is indulging in low-down hindsight politics."
- On July 2, the Daytona Beach News-Journal called the charges against Castor "groundless" and a "cheap shot," comparing ADP's practices to red-baiting.
- On July 11, former FBI Tampa bureau chief Al Robinson was quoted in the St. Petersburg Times as saying that Castor "asked for more information but was not told anything."

However, others stated that the ADP's allegations are true:

- On July 4, the Boca Raton News wrote that "these charges are justified and Deutsch need make no apology for bringing this ugly situation to the forefront of this campaign. Castor should be held accountable for not reacting to the Al-Arian terrorist links with the fervor it deserved. Standing by and watching while the public university you lead becomes a bastion for terrorist activities is not acceptable."
- On July 11, the Boca Raton News wrote that Jewish Journal publisher Bruce Warshal, "has become a joke – and his upcoming endorsement of Castor in spite of this ugly affair and comments she has made regarding Israel will be laughed at by readers of his publication."
- Former federal prosecutor John Loftus states that Castor "...had the full resources of the University to help her. She chose to avoid her duty as a public officer. In an act of moral cowardice, she wrote her staff 'I am deeply concerned by implications that the University should 'investigate' entities or people and be the arbiter of what political, social or religious ideology is "good" or "evil."' Her Vice President agreed that Al Arian's organization was an 'important cultural group' that was 'part of the USF diversity commitment.'"
