= Al-Quds Brigades =

Palestinian paramilitary organisation

Al-Quds Brigades سرايا القدس
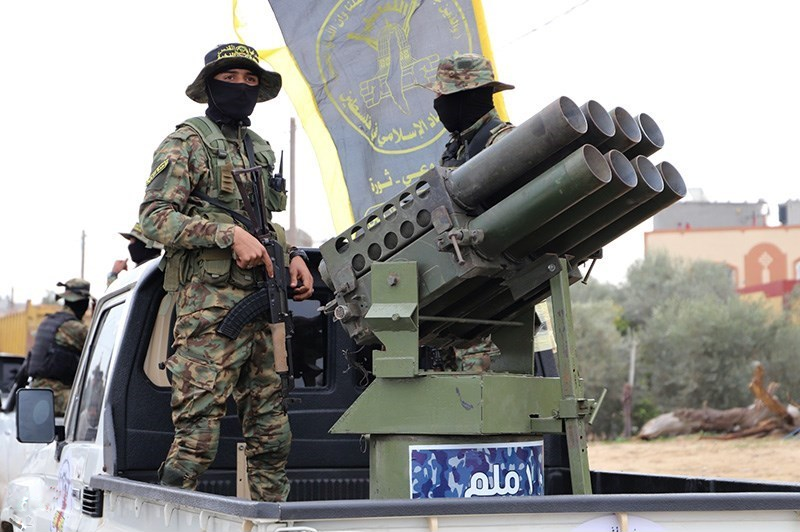
- Members of the Al-Quds Brigades parade through the Gaza Strip (2022)
- Spokesperson: Abu Hamza X
- Dates active: 1981–present
- Active regions: Gaza Strip, West Bank, Southern Lebanon
- Ideology: Sunni Islamism; Jihadism; Vanguardism; Palestinian nationalism Anti-Zionism
- Status: Active
- Size: 12,000
- Part of: (Palestine) Palestinian Joint Operations Room; Palestinian Islamic Jihad
- Website: saraya.ps

Al-Quds Brigades (Arabic: سرايا القدس, romanized: Sarāyā al-Quds, lit. ''Jerusalem Companies'') is a paramilitary organization and the armed wing of the Islamist Palestinian organization Palestinian Islamic Jihad Movement (PIJ), which is the second largest armed group in the Gaza Strip after Hamas. The Al-Quds Brigades (AQB) leader is Ziyad al-Nakhalah, based in Damascus, Syria. Before he was killed in 2019, the head of AQB in the Gaza Strip was Baha Abu al-Ata.

AQB's parent organization, PIJ, is devoted to the establishment of an Islamic state and the settlement of Palestinians in what it considers their rightful homeland (i.e., within the geographic borders of the pre-1948 Mandatory Palestine). It refuses to participate in political processes or negotiations about a swap of Israeli and Palestinian settlements. The PIJ is funded mostly by Iran, having previously received funding from Ba'athist Syria as well, before the fall of the Assad regime in 2024.

In 2026, the Al-Quds Brigades consented to the Board of Peace's disarmament plan for Gaza.

== History ==
Al-Quds Brigades was founded in 1981 by Fathi Shaqaqi and Abd Al Aziz Awda in Gaza, and has been active in the West Bank and the Gaza Strip, especially in the town of Jenin. Awda was designated a "Specially Designated Terrorist" by United States on 23 January 1995, and Shiqaqi was assassinated in Malta on 26 October 1995.

The group undertook numerous attacks on Israeli civilians, including suicide bombings; and has suffered extensive operations against its infrastructure carried out by the Israel Defense Forces (IDF), which resulted in severe losses to the group, and it appeared significantly weakened by 2004.

On 1 March 2006, Abu al-Walid al-Dahdouh, an AQB commander, was targeted and killed by an Israeli air strike in Gaza City as he drove past the Palestinian finance ministry. On 30 August 2006, the AQB West Bank leader, Hussam Jaradat, was shot and killed by undercover IDF in Jenin on 30 August 2006.

In the Gaza Strip, al-Quds Brigades continued its militant activities, including the indiscriminate firing of al-Quds rocket attacks out of populated civilian areas. Al-Quds Brigades promotes the military destruction of Israel, including the indiscriminate firing of rocket, mortar fire and suicide bombings.

In March 2014, over 100 rockets were launched into southern Israel by PIJ and other Islamist groups. On 14 March, Ramadan Shalah, the then leader of PIJ, announced that the attack was coordinated with Hamas.

Baha Abu al-Ata, the head of AQB in the Gaza Strip, was killed in a targeted killing in Gaza City on 12 November 2019, allegedly after having given orders for the launching of rockets into Israel. At the same time, Syrian media reported that another senior PIJ commander, Akram al-Ajouri, survived an airstrike in Damascus, but his son and daughter were killed. The next day, AQB launched more than 220 rockets into southern and central Israel, and on the next day the IDF struck several PIJ targets in the Gaza Strip killing two Palestinians, identified as 38-year-old Khaled Moawad Faraj, AQB's field commander, and 32-year-old Alaa Ashtyawu. Later that day, three more AQB members were killed in an Israeli Air Force airstrike while attempting to launch rockets into Israel. A ceasefire was agreed for 14 November, by which time AQB had launched over 400 rockets into Israel and a total of 36 Palestinians had been killed, including 25 members of PIJ or other factions in the Strip. This time, Hamas made no effort to stand with or assist PIJ.

Jihad Shaker al-Ghannam (secretary of the al-Quds Brigades' Military Council), Khalil Salah al-Bahtini (commander of its Northern Region), and Tariq Ibrahim Ezzedine (one of the heads of military action) were killed by an Israeli airstrike in May 2023.

The AQB has participated in the ongoing Gaza war, fighting alongside Hamas' Al-Qassam Brigades and other allied Palestinian factions.

In 2026, the Al-Quds Brigades agreed to the Board of Peace disarmament plan for Gaza.

== Organization ==
The Al-Quds Brigades has brigades in both the Gaza Strip and West Bank; it is most dominant in the latter territory.

In the Gaza Strip, its documented brigades are the North Gaza Brigade, the Gaza (Gaza City) Brigade, and the Central Camps Brigade.

In the West Bank, ACLED identified nine brigades in December 2023: the Nablus Brigade; the Jenin Brigade; the Jaba Brigade; the Tulkarm Brigade, the Jericho Brigade, the Balata Brigade, the Qabatiya Brigade, the Birqin Brigade, and the Tubas Brigade. Other brigades include the Nur Shams Brigade and the Ramallah Brigade.
