= Joseph Daaboul =

Lebanese poet (1959–2021)

- Born: 1959; Lebanon
- Died: 2021 (aged 61–62)
- Occupations: Poet, proofreader
- Notable work: "The Sea is a Rose of Vision" (Arabic title: Al-Bahar Wardat Al-Ro’yaa).

Joseph Daaboul (Arabic: جوزيف دعبول; 1959–2021) was a Lebanese poet and proofreader. Born in the northern Lebanese province of Aakkar, he acquired a degree in Arabic literature from the Lebanese University, he started his career in education and went to journalism. He worked as a proofreader for "AlMaseeira magazine" and then in "Al-Hayat newspaper", based in London. After closing because of financial problems, he moved to "Independent Arabia" in 2019 to work in the same field. He died from COVID-19.

== His poetry ==
Daaboul spent his life between books and magazines, so when he decided to share his poetry experience, it was different and elegant, because he wrote prose poems as one unit, and other prose poems as free poetry. It’s an extreme language that frees Daaboul from all the rules, patterns and methods that encircled poetry. He wrote about love magically, imagining a life and living it, away from his bitter reality. Using his vocabulary, he painted freedom without customs or traditions. In a number of his poems, he paid tribute to Kubani’s resistance against ISIS, and the resistance of the "Syrian Democratic Forces" against the Turkish invasion of Afrin about three years ago. He also wrote a lengthy poem about Barin Kobani, a Kurdish fighter whose body was mutilated by Turkish fighters during Ankara's attempt to control Afrin, denouncing the brutality of pro-Ankara Syrian armed group. He was influenced by the German philosopher Nietzsche, he advises to read the books of mythology and to take our understanding of it to what we think today. He said about the comparison between the library and the internet: "The library is a sea of paper and the internet is a sea of light, and I like to dive into them together because they are vast sources of science and knowledge."

== A collection of his poems ==
- "The Idiot" (Arabic title: Al-Akbaal), published by Dar AlNahda AlArabia.
- "The Sea is a Rose of Vision" (Arabic title: Al-Bahar Wardat Al-Ro’yaa), published by Dar AlNahda AlArabia.
- (Arabic title: Al-Laho Puriqati), published by Dar Alf Laylah wa Laylah, Translated to Persian.
