= American Democracy Project =

American Democracy Project may refer to:

- American Democracy Project (Florida group)
- American Democracy Project (AASCU initiative)
