= Dima Wannous =

Syrian writer and translator (born 1982)

Dima Wannous (Arabic: ديمة ونوس; born 1982 in Damascus, Syria) is a Syrian literary writer and journalist. She studied French literature at Damascus University and the University of Paris - Sorbonne. She also studied translation in France and has lived in Beirut, where she worked for the newspapers Al-Hayat and As-Safir. She has also worked for broadcast media (radio and TV).

== Life and career ==
Wannous first became known with Tafasil (Details), a short story collection released in 2007, which describes the Syrian society focussing on different characters with "ironic-grotesque overtones" and showing how they bow to power. She published her debut novel Kursi (The Chair) in 2008. In 2009, she was named one of the Beirut39, a group of 39 Arab writers under the age of 40 chosen through a contest by Banipal magazine and the Hay Festival.

Her 2017 novel Kha'ifoun (The Frightened Ones), describes the life of a young woman in Damascus during the Syrian civil war who receives a manuscript from a former lover who had fled to Germany. The book was shortlisted for the 2018 International Prize for Arabic Fiction, and has been translated into English, German, Dutch, Spanish, Turkish, and Norwegian.

Her narrative style has been described as "sober and often painfully precise".

Dima Wannous is the daughter of Syrian playwright Saadallah Wannous. She is married to the Syrian journalist Ibrahim Hamidi and both live in London.

== See also ==
- Syrian literature - Literature in the context of war and imprisonment
