= Ziyad al-Nakhalah =

Leader of the Palestinian Islamic Jihad

- زياد النخالة
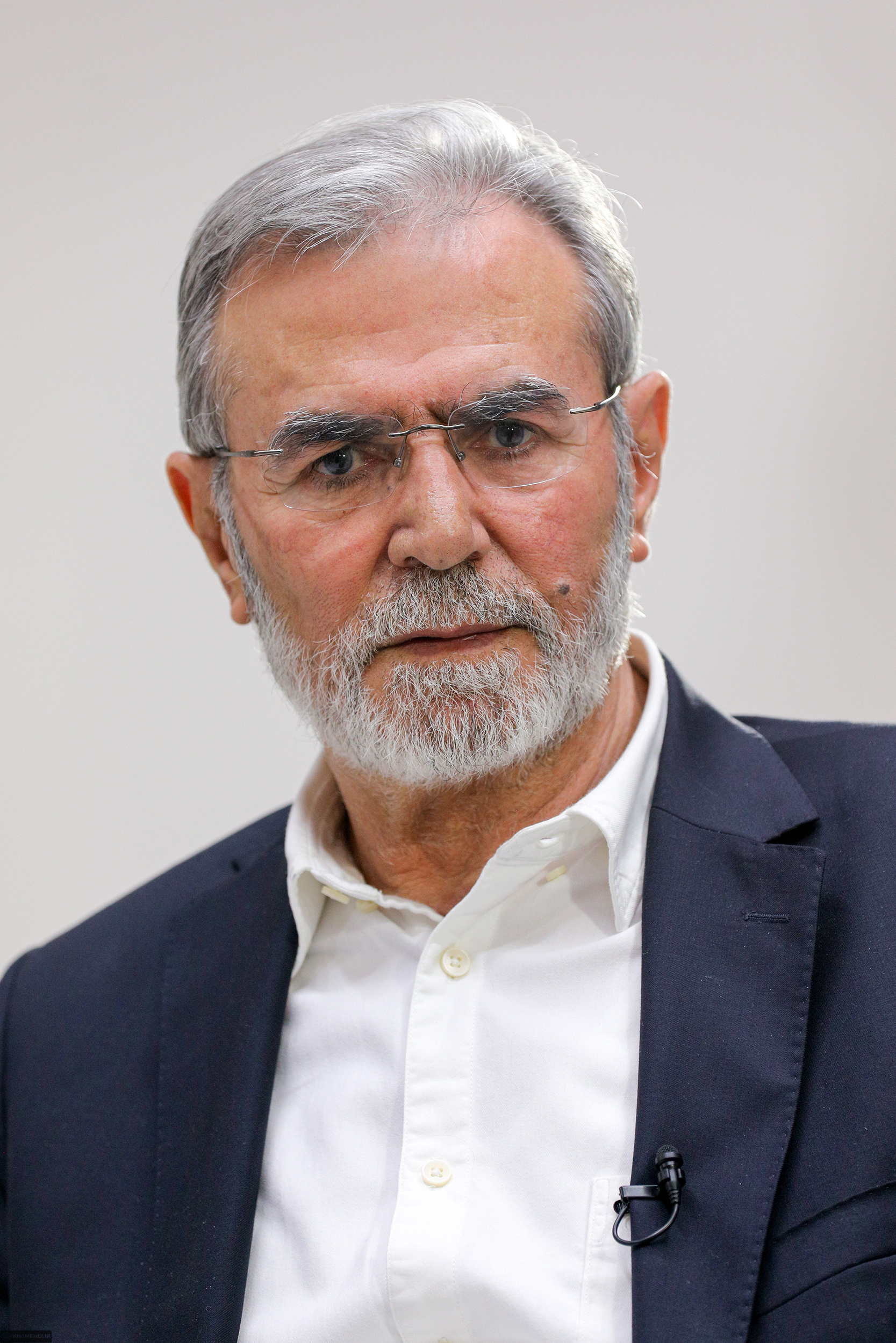
- al-Nakhalah in 2024

Secretary-General of the Islamic Jihad Movement in Palestine
- Incumbent
- Assumed office 28 September 2018
- Preceded by: Ramadan Shalah

Personal details
- Born: 6 April 1953 (age 73) Khan Yunis, All-Palestine Protectorate, Republic of Egypt
- Party: Palestinian Islamic Jihad

Ziyad al-Nakhalah (sometimes Ziad Nakhale; Arabic: زياد النخالة; born 6 April 1953) is a Palestinian politician who is the leader of the Palestinian Islamic Jihad (PIJ).

Nakhalah was born in Khan Yunis, Gaza Strip in 1953, then under Egyptian control. His father was killed during the 1956 Khan Yunis massacre. He finished his primary and secondary education in Khan Yunis and Gaza City. He then attended the Teachers' Institute in Gaza, earning a teaching diploma. In 1971, al-Nakhalah was sentenced to life imprisonment in Israel but was released in a prisoner swap in 1985.

After his release, he was tasked with establishing the PIJ's military wing in the Gaza Strip, the Al-Quds Brigades. Al-Nakhalah was detained again by Israel in April 1988 for his role in the First Intifada and was exiled to Lebanon in August with other PIJ leaders. Nakhalah became deputy secretary general of PIJ in 1995, and was elected secretary general of PIJ in 2018.

On 23 January 2014, Nakhalah was listed as a Specially Designated Terrorist by the United States, resulting in his property and interests in the United States being frozen. Since 28 September 2018, the PIJ has been declared a terrorist organization by several countries.

== Biography ==
Ziyad al-Nakhalah was born on 6 April 1953 in Khan Yunis, Gaza Strip, then under Egyptian occupation. His father was killed by the Israeli army in 1956 during the Khan Yunis massacre. Al-Nakhalah trained as a teacher in Gaza City.

In 1971, al-Nakhalah was sentenced to life imprisonment in Israel because of his militant activities with the Arab Liberation Front. He was one of the 1,150 security prisoners released by Israel on 21 May 1985 in a prisoner swap under the Jibril Agreement.

After his release from Israeli prison, then-PIJ secretary-general Fathi Shikaki tasked al-Nakhalah with establishing in the Gaza Strip the group’s military wing, the Al-Quds Brigades. Al-Nakhalah was detained again by Israel in April 1988 for his role in the First Intifada against the Israeli occupation, and was exiled to Lebanon in August 1988 with other PIJ leaders.

Al-Nakhalah became deputy secretary general of PIJ in 1995.

On 23 January 2014, Nakhalah was designated a Specially Designated Terrorist by the United States, resulting in his property and interests in the United States being frozen. The US also offered a $5-million reward for information leading to his capture.

Nakhalah was elected secretary general of PIJ on 28 September 2018, succeeding Ramadan Shalah, who suffered a series of strokes in April 2018.

During September 2023, al-Nakhalah met with Hezbollah leader Hassan Nasrallah, Hamas senior leader Saleh al-Arouri, and PFLP deputy secretary-general Jamil Mezher in Lebanon. Israeli media framed the meetings as indicative of an upcoming escalation in the Gaza Strip or West Bank.

In February 2025, al-Nakhalah visited Tehran, where he met with Iranian officials and praised Iran as the "home of the resistance," highlighting its support for allied armed groups in the region.

=== Assassination attempts ===
In January 2024, Israeli airstrikes targeted a building in Damascus, Syria, where he was believed to be staying, but he was not present at the time.

On 13 March 2025, the IDF struck the home of Ziyad al-Nakhalah in Dummar, Damascus, Syria, which it said served as a PIJ headquarters. Although the home was empty, one person was reportedly killed in the strike.
