= Abdel-Rahman Ayas =

Lebanese researcher, writer, journalist and translator

Abdel-Rahman Ayas (born 22 February 1968 in Beirut) is a Lebanese researcher, writer, journalist and translator. He finished elementary studies at the Islamic Charitable Purposes Association, intermediate and secondary studies at the Beirut Baptist School, and graduate studies at the American University of Beirut.

He worked in many newspapers and magazines, in both Arabic and English, including Monday Morning (Lebanon), The Middle East Reporter (Lebanon), The Daily Star (Lebanon), Al-Nouqad (Lebanon) and Al-Hayat. He chairs the Department of Economics in Al-Hayat since 2010; he joined the newspaper as an economic writer in 2005. His translations include The Gun and the Olive Branch by the British journalist David Hirst (journalist), which tells the story of the Palestinian cause, and The Roaring Nineties by the American economist Joseph Stiglitz, which tells the story of the short-lived boom in the United States during the second half of the 1990s. He also translated Austerity (book) by the British economist Mark Blyth, which tells the story of the 2008 financial crisis. He has other writings, research and translations.
