= Abu Hamza (spokesperson) =

Spokesperson of al-Quds Brigades from 2019 to 2025

Naji Abu Sayf
- ناجي ماهر أبو سيف

Spokesman of Al-Quds Brigades
- In office 29 March 2019 – 18 March 2025

Personal details
- Born: 10 April 1995 Al-Shati camp, Palestine
- Died: 18 March 2025 (aged 29) Gaza Strip, Palestine
- Cause of death: Assassination by airstrike
- Party: Palestinian Islamic Jihad

Military service
- Branch/service: Al-Quds Brigades
- Rank: Spokesperson

Naji Maher Abu Sayf (10 April 1995 – 18 March 2025), known by the Nom de guerre Abu Hamza, was a Palestinian militant who served as the spokesperson of the Al-Quds Brigades of Palestinian Islamic Jihad, a Islamist Palestinian political party and paramilitary organization, until his assassination in March 2025.

In March 2019, Abu Hamza stated that if Israel killed protesting Palestinian civilians, it would bring "anything other than war" in reference to Al-Quds Brigades intervention.

Abu Hamza and his wife, Shaima Abu Saif, were both killed in central Gaza during a night air raid during the Gaza war on 18 March 2025.

== See also ==
- Abu Obaida
