= Abu al-Walid al-Dahdouh =

Palestinian militant (died 2006)

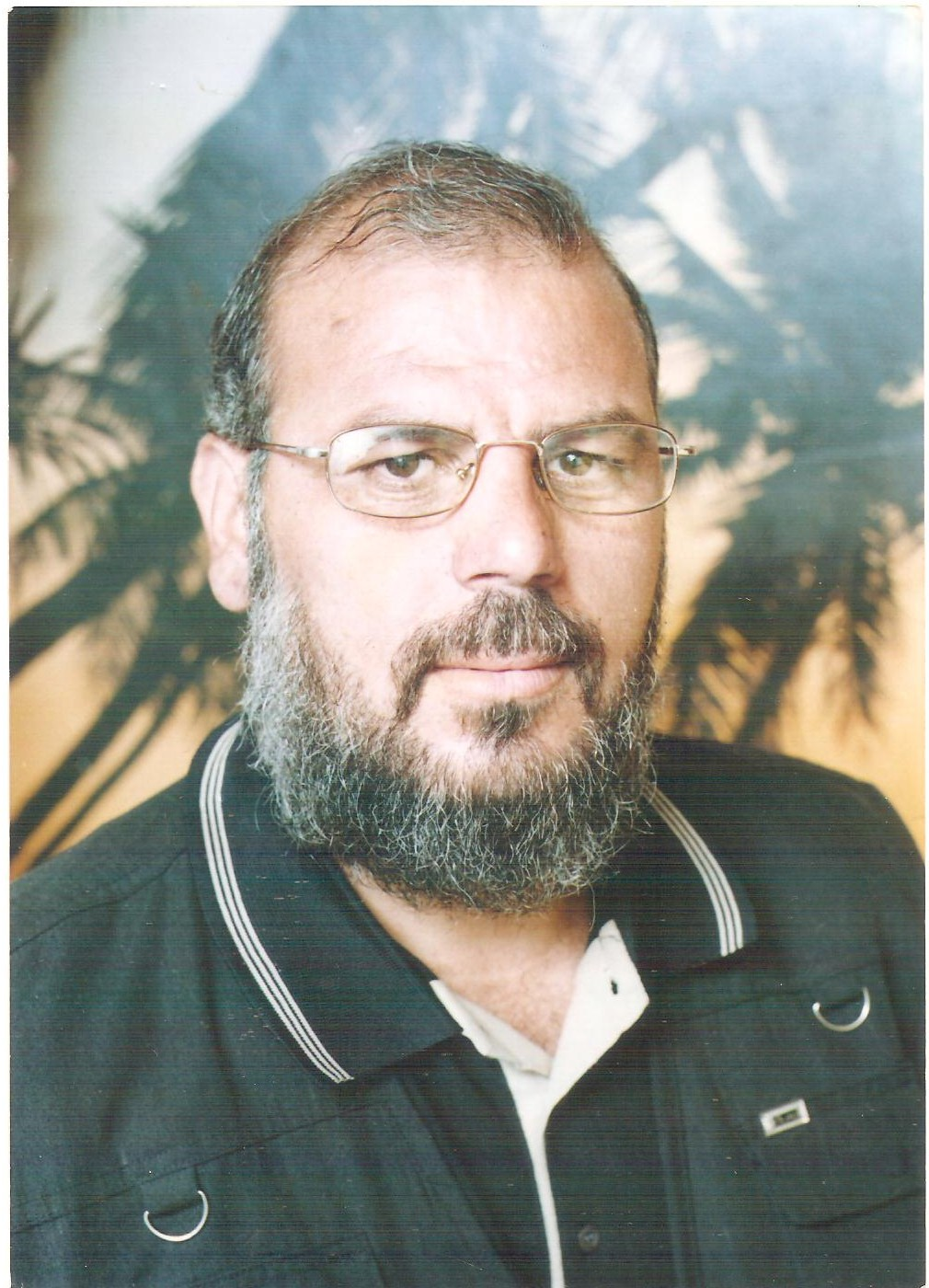
- Khaled Shaaban Ibrahim Al-Dahdouh, a Palestinian fighter, was the commander-in-chief of the Al-Quds Brigades in the Gaza Strip and the commander-in-chief of the resistance in Gaza
- Born: May 22, 1965; Gaza, Palestine
- Died: March 1, 2006 (aged 40); Gaza City, Gaza Strip
- Military career
- Allegiance: Islamic Jihad Movement in Palestine
- Branch: Al-Quds Brigades
- Nickname: Khaled

Abu al-Walid al-Dahdouh (Arabic: أبو الوليد الدحدوح) (22 May 1965 – 1 March 2006) was a senior leader of the Palestinian militant group Islamic Jihad and a commander of the group's military wing, the Al-Quds Brigades. He was killed by an Israeli airstrike in Gaza City on 1 March 2006 as he drove past the Palestinian finance ministry. The attack took place hours after militants fired a rocket towards the Israeli coastal town of Ashkelon.

== Early life and education ==
Al-Walid was born on May 22, 1965, in the Zeitoun neighborhood of Gaza City. He was the third of his siblings, and received his primary education through high school in the Zeitoun neighborhood.

== Role in the resistance ==
Khaled, known as Abu al-Walid, was one of the most prominent commanders of al-Quds Brigades, the military wing of the Islamic Jihad movement in the Gaza Strip during the Intifada. He was on the list of those wanted by the occupation, especially after the assassinations of the commanders of the Quds Brigades, and was subjected to five assassination attempts.

Khaled headed Saraya's manufacturing unit in Gaza, as well as its technical unit, and was behind many of the military operations carried out by the military wing against Israeli targets in the Gaza Strip during the intifada, especially rocket fire and storming Israeli military sites and settlements before the Israeli withdrawal from Gaza.

Khaled was widely respected in the Gaza Strip, with a strong network of relationships with all the leaders of the military arms of the resistance movements, as well as strong ties with Palestinian families, and he was one of the main coordinators of Saraya's operations in the West Bank as well.

== Assassination attempts ==
Khaled was the target of several unsuccessful assassination attempts, the last of which was several months before his assassination, when he survived an assassination attempt during which two of his comrades in the manufacturing unit of the Al-Quds Brigades were killed.

== Death ==
Khaled was killed on March 1, 2006, following a gruesome assassination. While he was walking near the Palestinian Ministry of Finance building in the Tel al-Hawa neighborhood, a car bomb parked on the side of the road exploded, killing him instantly, and his body was blown to pieces and scattered over a large area.
