= Abdul Aziz Awda =

Palestinian militant leader (born 1946 or 1950)

- عبد العزيز عودة
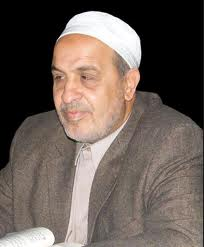
- Awda in 2013
- Born: December 20, 1950 (age 75) (according to FBI); 1946 (age 79–80) (according to OFAC); Jabalia, All-Palestine Protectorate
- Education: Cairo University (bachelor's); Zagazig University (master's)
- Occupation: Imam
- Known for: Co-founder and spiritual leader of the Islamic Jihad Movement in Palestine

Abdul Aziz Awda, (Note: Also rendered as 'Abd al-'Aziz 'Auda, 'Abd al-Aziz 'Odeh, Abd Al-Aziz Uda, Abdel Aziz Odeh, and Adbal Aziz Odeh.) also known as Sheik Awda (born 1946 or 20 December 1950), is a Palestinian cleric who, along with Fathi Shaqaqi, founded the Palestinian Islamic Jihad (PIJ), a Palestinian Islamist paramilitary organization based in Damascus, Syria and the Gaza Strip.

Awda and Shaqaqi, both natives of the Gaza Strip, met as students in Egypt. They founded the PIJ between the late 1970s and early 1980s, dissatisfied with the secular and/or passive nature of most Palestinian nationalist organizations, such as the Palestine Liberation Organization and the Muslim Brotherhood. Upon his return to Gaza in 1981, Awda became an imam at a mosque, where he promoted "Islam, jihad, and Palestine", leading to his arrest for incitement in 1984 and his deportation in 1987 during the prelude to the First Intifada.

Awda, based in Beirut, Lebanon after his deportation, continued to support the PIJ alongside Shaqaqi, who was deported in 1988, traveling abroad to garner potential support and to speak at conferences hosted by Sami Al-Arian, another member of the PIJ. However, Awda's relationship with Shaqaqi deteriorated in the 1990s, and after Shaqaqi's assassination in 1995, his successor, Ramadan Shalah, allegedly expelled Awda from the organization, though this series of events is denied by the Federal Bureau of Investigation, which believes he is still involved with the PIJ. He was allowed to return to Gaza with the assent of the Palestinian Authority in 1999 and the consent of Israel in 2000.

Awda was listed as a Specially Designated Terrorist by the U.S. Treasury Department on 23 January 1995. A little over eight years later, on 20 February 2003, Awda and seven other high-ranking PIJ members were charged by a grand jury based in Tampa, Florida with racketeering, conspiracy to commit murder and provide material support to terrorists, and numerous Travel Act violations. Awda was among the second group of fugitives to be added to the FBI Most Wanted Terrorists list on 24 February 2006, along with Shalah. He has additionally been alleged to have had ties to other Islamic extremists such as the conspirators in the 1993 World Trade Center bombing and the subsequent New York City landmark bomb plot.

== Early life and education ==
The FBI states that Awda was born on 20 December 1950 in Jabalia, a village just south of the city of Beit Lahia, in the Gaza Strip. However, the U.S. Treasury Department's Office of Foreign Assets Control (OFAC) lists 1946 as his year of birth. Awda's family was originally from the Beersheba district in southern Mandatory Palestine, and came to Gaza in 1948, living in the Jabalia refugee camp.

Awda obtained a bachelor's degree in Arab and Islamic studies at Dar al-Ulum, part of Cairo University in Egypt, and a master's degree in Sharia law at Zagazig University in Zagazig, a city north of Cairo, where he met future PIJ co-founder Fathi Shaqaqi. Awda and Shaqaqi's time in Zagazig, a hotspot of radical Islamism, particularly Qutbism, proved to be influential on their beliefs. The two were among a group of Palestinian student activists in Egypt who found themselves dissatisfied with the state of the Palestinian cause, finding the Palestinian Liberation Organization (PLO) to be too nationalistic and the Muslim Brotherhood to be too passive and unconcerned with Palestine. This dissatisfaction led the group to break away from the Muslim Brotherhood, which they had been members of during the 1970s. The Iranian Revolution was a major influence on Awda's political outlook and the Palestinian Islamic Jihad's ideology, serving as proof that violent revolt was the key to expelling Western influence and establishing an Islamic state.

Awda eventually departed Egypt, returning to Gaza in 1981. (Note: Rahamim Emanuilov and Andrey Yashlavsky claimed that Awda and Shaqaqi were forced to leave Egypt together after the assassination of Anwar Sadat. Meir Hatina gave a different account, stating that Awda was exiled from Egypt in 1975 due to his involvement with radical Islamism, spending the next six years as a teacher in the United Arab Emirates.) In Gaza, Awda worked as a professor of Sharia at the Islamic University of Gaza (IUG) and as an imam at the al-Qassam Mosque, located in the Nuseirat Camp. (Note: The mosque was destroyed by an Israeli airstrike during the 2014 Gaza war.)

== Palestinian Islamic Jihad activity ==
=== Foundation and deportation ===
Awda and Shaqaqi founded the Islamic Jihad Movement in Palestine between the late 1970s and early 1980s. (Note: The year of the Palestinian Islamic Jihad's foundation is disputed, with possible years including 1980 (according to Ziad Abu-Amr and Yehudit Barsky), 1981 (according to Lara Marlowe and the Australian government), and 1983 (according to Emanuilov and Yashlavsky). While most sources place the PIJ's foundation in the 1980s, Sherifa Zuhur and Holly Fletcher have written that the movement was created in the 1970s. Hayley Gillooly wrote that the PIJ was founded at some point between 1979 and 1980.) Awda became the organization's spiritual leader upon its foundation. Based in the al-Qassam Mosque, Awda promoted the cause of "Islam, jihad, and Palestine" — Islam as an ideological foundation for and jihad as a means of liberating Palestine — at his Friday sermons, and garnered much respect in Gaza for his preaching and speaking skills. Mosques were important recruitment locations for the PIJ and the al-Qassam Mosque in particular was retrospectively referred to as a "jihadist center" by the PIJ in 1989. However, the PIJ's differences with the Muslim Brotherhood's Palestinian branch led to harassment and attacks on Awda and other PIJ leaders, including a physical assault in 1983 that left Awda hospitalized. These difficulties forced the Palestinian Islamic Jihad's leadership, including Awda, to meet in the homes of sympathizers, most importantly that of Mahmud al-Khawaja, who would go on to direct the PIJ's militant activities.

Beginning in August 1983, when PIJ members murdered a yeshiva student in Hebron, resulting in mass arrests and Awda's banning from the IUG campus, he and the Palestinian Islamic Jihad became the focus of greater scrutiny from the Israeli government. In 1984 he was arrested and spent eleven months in prison for incitement. Although Awda avoided directly associating himself with PIJ attacks, he continued to promote its cause and convened with three of its members prior to an attack in October 1986. After a series of clashes between the Israel Defense Forces and six PIJ members, beginning with their escape from prison on 18 May 1987 and ending with their deaths in Shuja'iyya on 6 October, Awda praised them and called on his fellow Palestinians to follow the principle of martyrdom. As violence and tensions between Palestinians and the Israeli government rose, Awda's ability to motivate and mobilize demonstrators became a cause for concern. On 17 November 1987, Commander Yitzhak Mordechai ordered his deportation from Gaza, sparking protests at the IUG and the al-Qassam Mosque. (Note: Abu-Amr and Hatina have speculated that the reason Awda and other arrested PIJ members were deported in the late 1980s instead of being imprisoned, as was the practice before, was to prevent the organization's leaders from recruiting new members from among their fellow inmates.) Awda protested the decision, denying membership in any extremist organizations and arguing that he was promoting jihad as self-defense rather than violence. Shaqaqi would be deported as well on 1 August 1988.

=== Travels, organizational tensions, and alleged expulsion ===
After Awda and Shaqaqi's deportation, the two moved the PIJ's headquarters to Beirut, Lebanon, assisted by the Iranian embassy and members of Hezbollah. The move marked the start of a deepening of ties between the PIJ and Iran, as the country and Hezbollah began to provide financial and logistical support to the PIJ, and Awda and Shaqaqi would meet with the Iranian Embassy and Hezbollah members multiple times. Awda and Shaqaqi publicly expressed support for the Iranian Revolution, and Awda defended Iran's continuation of the Iran-Iraq War in a column published in Al-Fajr on 23 August 1987. Awda traveled abroad frequently to garner support, with destinations including Iran, the United Arab Emirates, and Chicago, Illinois, the latter of which he traveled to multiple times in order to attend and speak at conferences of the Islamic Concern Project, a nonprofit headed by fellow PIJ member Sami Al-Arian.

Despite Awda's activity in support of the PIJ, he along with other founding members became increasingly frustrated with Shaqaqi's style of leadership in the 1990s. In 1993, Awda supported a statement from another member, Salih 'Abd al-'Al, condemning Shaqaqi's leadership abilities. In a column in al-Mujahid, a PIJ-produced periodical, published on 12 March 1993, Awda indirectly criticized Shaqaqi's sidelining of other founding members, referencing how Muhammad's companions were involved in his decision-making, making the whole group feel like equals. The PIJ's poor finances were a major point of contention, with Awda being convinced by PIJ treasurer Taysir al-Khatib not to send money to Shaqaqi when the latter requested it. However, Musa Abu Samir, the PIJ's leader in Lebanon, has alleged that the main source of the dispute between Awda and Shaqaqi was the latter's attempt to include Palestinian Christians in the organization; Awda wished the PIJ to be Muslim-only, resulting in his suspension from the organization. On 26 October 1995, Shaqaqi was assassinated in Malta by Mossad agents, and was replaced as secretary-general of the PIJ by Ramadan Shalah. According to Abu Samir, Awda's relationship with Shalah, a supporter of Shaqaqi, was similarly poor, and the new secretary-general expelled Awda entirely from the organization almost immediately after taking office. This is denied by the FBI, which states that Awda is still involved with the PIJ. Awda was allowed to return to Gaza by the Palestinian Authority in April 1999, with Israel consenting to the decision in March 2000. After his return, Awda resumed his position as imam at the al-Qassam Mosque.

== Terrorist designation and criminal charges ==
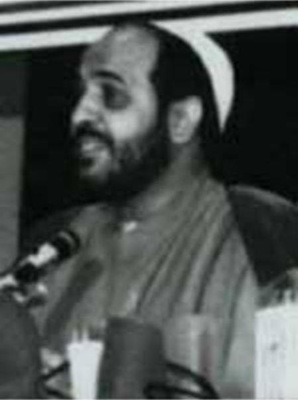
Image of Awda used in his wanted poster

The indictment of Omar Abdel-Rahman and eleven others issued by the United States District Court for the Southern District of New York referred to Awda as a co-conspirator in the 1993 World Trade Center bombing and New York City landmark bomb plot, having met with indicted and later convicted plotters Mahmud Abouhalima, Clement Rodney Hampton-El, and El Sayyid Nosair on 3 January 1989, and Abdel-Rahman himself at Kennedy International Airport whilst traveling to a conference in Chicago in 1990. Awda was not indicted despite the allegation.

Awda was among the first group of people to be listed as Specially Designated Terrorists (SDTs) by the OFAC, having been named in the list of SDTs prepared on 23 January 1995, the same day that the category was created. The search warrant issued to justify the FBI raid of the SAAR Foundation on 21 March 2002 claimed that SAAR was providing money to the PIJ, listing Awda among other high-ranking PIJ members like Shalah and designated terrorists such as Osama bin Laden.

On 20 February 2003, Awda was one of eight people, including Al-Arian, al-Khatib, and Shalah, charged under the Racketeer Influenced and Corrupt Organizations Act for their roles in the PIJ. The indictment issued by the United States District Court for the Middle District of Florida accused the eight of coordinating and engaging in various racketeering activities, such as bombings, extortion, and money laundering, beginning in 1984. In addition to one count of racketeering, Awda was charged with one count of conspiracy to murder, maim, or injure persons outside the United States, one count of conspiracy to provide material support to terrorists, and 40 counts of Travel Act violation. Awda and Shalah were added to the FBI Most Wanted Terrorists list on 24 February 2006.

== See also ==
- Gaza–Israel conflict
- Islam in Palestine
- Palestinian political violence

== Sources ==
- Abu-Amr, Ziad (1994). Islamic Fundamentalism in the West Bank and Gaza: Muslim Brotherhood and Islamic Jihad. Indiana University Press. ISBN 0-253-30121-1.
- Barsky, Yehudit (2002). Terrorism Briefing: Islamic Jihad Movement in Palestine (PDF). American Jewish Committee.
- Gillooly, Hayley (2006–2007). "The Palestinian Islamic Jihad: True Religious Terrorism in the Middle East". Law and Society Journal at the University of California, Santa Barbara. 6: 15–24. – via HeinOnline (subscription required)
- Hatina, Meir (2001). Islam and Salvation in Palestine: The Islamic Jihad Movement. Moshe Dayan Center for Middle Eastern and African Studies. ISBN 9789652240484.
- Skare, Erik (2021). A History of Palestinian Islamic Jihad: Faith, Awareness, and Revolution in the Middle East. Cambridge University Press. ISBN 9781108845069.
