= Bernie Friedman =

American lawyer

Bernie Friedman is an attorney in Hollywood, Florida, and a major political figure in South Florida, often called the "sixth commissioner" of Hollywood.

Formerly president of the College Democrats of America, he worked for Rep. Larry Smith during the 1980s before joining the law firm of Becker & Poliakoff in Hollywood.

Friedman has been accused of ethics violations because of his dual role as attorney for condominium developers and lobbyist for the city of Hollywood, and because of his extensive fundraising for political candidates in South Florida.

He is currently chairman of the American Democracy Project.

In 2012, Bernie Friedman suffered from a near death experience, when according to Mr Friedman, a crazy local news reporter allegedly tried to kill him by pushing him down an escalator just to get a story.
