= Fathi Shaqaqi =

Palestinian political and militant leader (1981 to 1995)

Fathi Shaqaqi فتحي الشقاقي

Secretary-General of the Islamic Jihad Movement in Palestine
- In office 1981–1995
- Preceded by: Office established
- Succeeded by: Ramadan Shalah

Personal details
- Born: Fathi Ibrahim Abdul Aziz Shaqaqi; 4 January 1951 Rafah, All-Palestine Protectorate
- Died: 26 October 1995 (aged 44) Sliema, Malta
- Cause of death: Gunshot wound
- Party: Islamic Jihad Movement in Palestine
- Children: 3
- Education: Birzeit University (B.Math.); Mansoura University (M.D.)
- Profession: Math teacher Pediatrician

Fathi Ibrahim Abdulaziz Shaqaqi (Arabic: فتحي إبراهيم عبد العزيز الشقاقي, romanized: Fatẖī Ibrāhīm ‘Abd ul-‘Aziz ash-Shaqāqī; 4 January 1951 – 26 October 1995) was a Palestinian physician, leader and the founder and Secretary-General of the Palestinian Islamic Jihad (PIJ), a Palestinian Islamist paramilitary organization.

Shaqaqi was born in the Gaza Strip to a refugee family and received his early education at a United Nations school. He studied physics and mathematics at Bir Zeit University and later medicine at Mansoura University in Egypt. Shaqaqi became a follower of Hassan al-Banna, founder of the Muslim Brotherhood, and Sayyid Qutb. Influenced by the Iranian Revolution, he wrote a book praising Ayatollah Khomeini's approach to an Islamic state.

In 1981, Shaqaqi co-founded Islamic Jihad with the goal of establishing a sovereign Islamic state across Israel and the Palestinian territories. The organization rejected political processes, focusing on achieving its goals through military means. As the PIJ leader, Shaqaqi masterminded several suicide bombings in Israel. He was assassinated by Mossad agents in Malta in 1995, leading to a weakening of the PIJ until its resurgence after the Arab Spring.

== Early life and career ==
Shaqaqi was born to a refugee family of eight children in the slums of a refugee camp in Rafah in the southern Gaza Strip. His family was originally from Zarnuqa near Ramlah, where they had lived for nearly five generations and his grandfather had served as the imam of the local mosque. His family descended from Muhammad Awhida al-Shaqaqi, an Ottoman soldier from Tarhuna in Libya, who was first sent to Syria where he got married, and later settled in Zarnuqa where he raised a family. The Shaqaqi family fled Zarnuqa during the 1948 Arab–Israeli War in fear of Israeli massacres, and were not allowed to return. His mother died when he was fifteen. Fathi Shaqaqi's brother Khalil, after teaching in several universities in the United States, Kuwait and Bahrain, moved after the Oslo Peace Accords to the West Bank and is founding director of the Nablus-based Palestinian Center for Policy and Survey Research, established in 1993.

Most of his early education was at the United Nations school. He attended Bir Zeit University in the West Bank, where he studied physics and mathematics. In 1970–1974, he taught mathematics at a school for orphans in East Jerusalem. In 1974 he moved to Egypt to study medicine at Mansoura University, specializing in pediatrics. Upon receiving his medical degree in 1981, he worked in a general practice at Augusta Victoria Hospital in Jerusalem. He later opened a medical clinic in Gaza.

== Leader of Islamic Jihad ==
During his studies at Birzeit University Shaqaqi became an admirer of Hassan al-Banna, founder of the Muslim Brotherhood, and Sheikh Ahmed Yassin, the founder of Hamas. While studying medicine in Egypt he was an acquaintance of Sheikh Omar Abdel-Rahman, leader of al-Gama'a al-Islamiyya and Egyptian Islamic Jihad, and Salah Sariya, a Salafi Palestinian executed in 1976 on the charge of having plotted the assassination of President of Egypt Anwar Sadat. He also became a follower of the ideas of Sayyid Qutb and Hassan al-Banna. He also read Marxist literature, including allegedly the entire works of Karl Marx, but kept untouched by socialism. The teachings of Qutb convinced Shkaki that the "corrupt and secular governments" of the Arab world had to be replaced by Islamic societies politically, socially and culturally. Shaqaqi came to believe that the PLO opposition to Israeli occupation was worthless and that only an Islamist organisations could achieve any political and military successes against Israel. By the later 1970s Shaqaqi broke with both the Muslim Brotherhood and secular Palestinian nationalist groups, dismayed that the former spoke too little about Palestine and the latter too little on Islam. As a university student in Egypt, Shiqaqi was inspired by the triumph of the 1979 Iranian Revolution. He wrote a short book praising Khomeini's approach to Islamic governance titled Khomeini, The Islamic Solution and the Alternative, published in Cairo four days after the victory of the revolution. In Shaqaqi's view the Khomeini victory "demonstrated that even against an enemy as powerful as the Shah, a jihad of determined militants could overcome all obstacles." The book sold 10,000 copies in just two days, before it was promptly banned by the Egyptian government and Shiqaqi briefly arrested. The Palestinian Islamic Jihad, of which Shiqaqi was a founding member, remains ideologically and militarily aligned with Iran, its largest supplier of weapons and aid.

In 1981, along with Abd Al Aziz Awda and five other Palestinian Islamist and Salafi leaders, he founded the Islamic Jihad Movement in Palestine. The aim of the organization was the establishment of a sovereign, Islamic Palestinian state within the geographic borders of pre-1948 Mandatory Palestine. Completely rejecting the political process, the organization professes that its goals can only be achieved through Islamic Jihad military means. While an adherent of Islamism, Shaqaqi would later state to British journalist Robert Fisk that "We are not talking about theology, we are talking about politics and military things," adding that "Islam would be the idea we would start with, Palestine the goal to liberate and Jihad would be the way, the method." He described the organization as a "crossing-point between nationalist and Islamism", and that his intentions were not to establish an Islamic state, but merely to "liberate all of Palestine." Fisk was surprised that Shaqaqi neither greeted him with "As-salamu alaykum" nor quoted the Quran. Speaking about his motives during the Fisk interview, Shaqaqi stated: "We are only defending our right to live in our homeland ... We lived in peace with Jews for centuries... I have no problem with Jews ... But I will fight occupation." In an interview with Charles Richards of The Independent in 1992, Shaqaqi stated that his aim was a Palestine from the river to the sea "where all religions can live together in one state under Islamic Quranic law." While nominally a Sunni organization, the PIJ has made every effort to play down the basic differences between Shia and Sunni, instead emphasizing the common elements of the entire Islamic nation. Regarding the Palestinian Christians as "our partners in history and destiny," Shaqaqi's organization also had Christian members.

The PIJ recruited former leaders of other Palestinian organisations such as the PLO. Many were recruited from the predecessor of the PIJ, originally known as the Popular Liberation Forces (Quwat at-Tahrir ash-Sha'biya) also referred to in some sources as the "Palestine Liberation Force", which was founded in 1964, in Gaza, by Ziad al-Husseini (also called Zaid al-Husseini) as an exclusively Fedayeen group supplementing the newly formed Palestine Liberation Army, which is the army of the PLO. The group was often in conflict with the Fatah of Arafat. In 1971, Israel killed al-Husseini and arrested all members of the groups but were later released during the 1980s. In 1981, Shaqiqi created a small secretive organization engaged in assassinations, mass shootings, bombings and suicide bombings against the Israeli military. Shaqaqi prohibited targeting innocent civilians, which however did not include Israeli settlers. After his killing all Israelis were deemed legitimate targets. An elitist group, its appeal is mainly among the educated youth. Shaqaqi was arrested in Gaza by Israel in 1983 for publishing the magazine "Islamic Vanguard", but released the following year. He was rearrested in 1986 and sentenced to four years in prison at Ashkelon and Nafah in the Negev desert. In 1988 he was deported to Southern Lebanon, allegedly at the orders of Yitzhak Rabin. Shaqaqi learned Hebrew while imprisoned in Israel, and kept a Hebrew dictionary on the bookshelf at his office in the Palestinian Yarmouk Camp on the outskirts of Damascus, which was decorated with a model of Al-Aqsa mosque, a lithograph of Hani Abed and framed photographs of suicide bombers Able to speak "flawless English," Shaqaqi stated to Fisk that "Before I am a politician and the leader of Islamic Jihad, I am a human being and a poet..." He was well read in the literature of Shakespeare, Dante, T. S. Eliot, Ezra Pound, E. M. Forster and other Western writers, quoting Hamlet in length during his interview with Fisk. Shortly after his expulsion to Lebanon in 1988, Shaqaqi met Ruhollah Khomeini in Tehran, who pledged financial and military support for his organization. While in Lebanon the PIJ built up a very close relationship with the Shia Islamist group Hezbollah led by Hassan Nasrallah, and received military training from the Iranian Revolutionary Guards. In 1990, he settled in Damascus under the protection of President of Syria Hafez al-Assad.

As the leader of the PIJ, Shaqaqi masterminded several suicide bombings in Israel. He was a key player in setting up the National Alliance in January 1994, a coalition of eight PLO groups, Islamic Jihad and Hamas rejecting the Oslo process. The PIJ is considered by Israel to be one of the most extreme and violent organisation in its operational methods and commitment to the destruction of Israel. By 1995 it was according to Fisk "perhaps the fiercest of all Israel's modern-day enemies."

== Assassination ==
Shaqaqi was shot five times on 26 October 1995 in front of the Diplomat Hotel in Sliema, Malta by a hit team said to be composed of two Mossad agents. The assassination happened a few days after Shaqaqi conducted an interview with journalist Ibrahim Hamidi of Al-Hayat Newspaper. Shaqaqi had been travelling under the false name Dr. Ibrahim Ali Shawesh. He was on his way back from Tripoli after visiting Libyan leader Muammar Gaddafi who promised to help finance Shaqaqi's factions. His assassination produced disarray in Islamic Jihad since no competent successor could replace Shaqaqi. Islamic Jihad sources in Gaza confirmed that Shiqaqi had been traveling from Libya to his home in Damascus and made a stopover in Malta.

Accounts vary in details. In the Telegraph version by Gordon Thomas, two men, Gil and Ran, arrived in Malta on a late-afternoon flight, after receiving new passports provided by fellow agents in Rome and Athens (sayan), and checked into the Diplomat Hotel where Shaqaqi was residing. Another local sayan who owned a car rental agency provided Ran with a Yamaha motorcycle, which he told hotel staff he planned to use for touring the island. At the same time, a freighter from Haifa radioed the Maltese harbour authorities that it had developed engine trouble and would need to anchor off the island for repairs. A team of Mossad communications technicians on board sent the agents instructions through an encrypted radio system in Gil's suitcase. The two kidon operatives then drove up on the motorcycle and pulled up while Shaqaqi was walking along the waterfront and one of them, Gil, shot him six times in the head, a 'kidon signature'. Ronen Bergman writes that Shaqaqi was out shopping, and was shot twice in the forehead and twice in the back of the head, with a semi-automatic pistol fitted with a silencer and a device to catch the spent cartridges, and that the motorbike had been stolen the day before.

== Legacy ==
Shaqaqi left behind a wife and three children, two boys and a girl. He was succeeded as Secretary-General of the PIJ by fellow co-founder Ramadan Shallah. His funeral in Damascus on 1 November 1995 was attended by some 40,000. The assassination of Shaqaqi, who was regarded as a highly charismatic and capable leader, and the subsequent crackdown on the PIJ by Israel and the Palestinian National Authority led to a significant weakening of the organization. Following the Arab Spring the group has enjoyed a revival in its military and political strength with increased Syrian and Iranian support, and in some Gaza precincts, Shaqaqi's picture is more prominent than that of the Hamas prime minister.

== See also ==
- Palestinian political violence
