= Ramadan Shalah =

Palestinian militant and politician (1958–2020)

- رمضان شلح
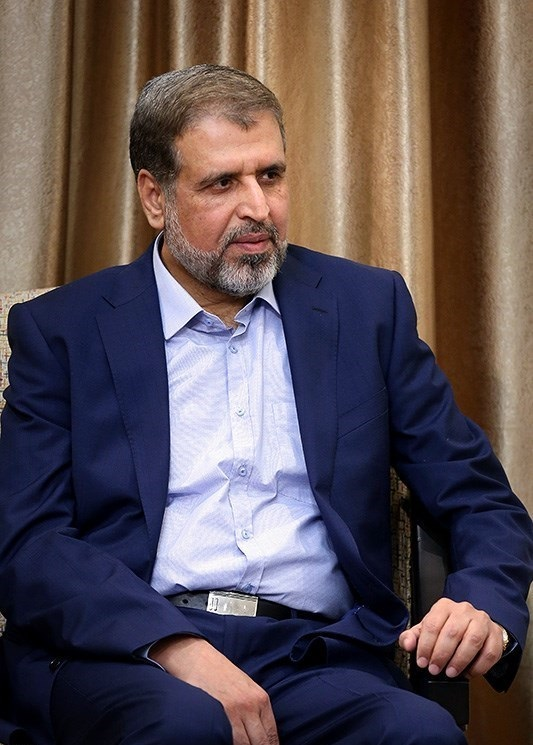
- Ramadan Shalah in 2016

Secretary-General of the Islamic Jihad Movement in Palestine
- In office 27 October 1995 – 27 September 2018
- Deputy: Ziyad al-Nakhalah
- Preceded by: Fathi Shaqaqi
- Succeeded by: Ziyad al-Nakhalah

Personal details
- Born: Ramadan Abdullah Mohammad Shalah; 1 January 1958 Shuja'iyya, Gaza City, All-Palestine Protectorate, Republic of Egypt
- Died: 6 June 2020 (aged 62) Beirut, Lebanon
- Resting place: Yarmouk Camp, Syria
- Party: Islamic Jihad Movement in Palestine
- Education: Durham University (Ph.D.)
- Profession: Professor of Economics

Ramadan Abdullah Mohammed Shalah (Arabic: رمضان عبد الله محمد شلح; 1 January 1958 – 6 June 2020) was a Palestinian militant and politician who served as the leader of Palestinian Islamic Jihad (PIJ) from 1995 to 2018.

On becoming secretary-general of PIJ, Shalah was designated a Specially Designated Terrorist (SDT) by the United States on 27 November 1995. In 2006, he was placed on the United States FBI Most Wanted Terrorists list.

In April 2018, Shalah suffered a series of strokes, and on 28 September 2018 was replaced by Ziyad al-Nakhalah as PIJ leader.

During the 23 years of his leadership of PIJ, the group undertook numerous attacks on Israeli civilians, including suicide bombings; and has suffered extensive operations against its infrastructure carried out by the IDF, which resulted in severe losses to the group, and it appeared significantly weakened by 2004.

== Early life ==
Shalah was born in Shuja'iyya, a neighborhood in Gaza City. Shalah earned a Ph.D. in banking and economics from the University of Durham in England.

Professor Sami Al-Arian helped bring Shalah to the University of South Florida, in Tampa, Florida, where Shalah taught as an adjunct professor. Al-Arian and Shalah founded an Islamic think tank, World and Islamic Studies Enterprise (WISE). Shalah left the organization in 1995 to head Palestinian Islamic Jihad (PIJ).

In February 2003, al-Arian, Shalah and five others were indicated by the United States Department of Justice for supporting the PIJ and relatives of operatives who committed attacks against civilians in Israel. Al-Arian pled guilty to helping PIJ and was sentenced to 57 months in prison. Al-Arian said he was shocked to learn Shalah was "anything other than a scholar."

== Palestinian Islamic Jihad activity ==
Shalah became PIJ secretary-general 1995 after the assassination of its previous leader Fathi Shiqaqi in Malta. On becoming secretary-general of PIJ, the United States named Shalah a Specially Designated Terrorist and offered a $5 million reward for information leading to his arrest or conviction on 27 November 1995.

In 2003, Shalah, Abd Al Aziz Awda, and six others were indicted in a 53 count indictment in the United States District Court for the Middle District of Florida on Racketeer Influenced and Corrupt Organizations Act (RICO) charges of alleged involvement in racketeering activities for PIJ, a US-designated international terrorist organization, which had conducted suicide bombings that killed Israeli and American civilians. Shalah was wanted for conspiracy to conduct the affairs of the PIJ through a pattern of racketeering activities such as bombings, murders, extortion, and money laundering.

For that indictment, Shalah then became one of six alleged and indicted terrorist fugitives among the second and most recent group of indicted fugitives to be added to the United States FBI Most Wanted Terrorists list on 24 February 2006, along with Abd Al Aziz Awda.

== Death ==
In 2018, Shalah was transferred from his home in Damascus to a hospital in Beirut. He died on 6 June 2020 in Lebanon after a long illness that included two years in a coma. His funeral was held in Damascus and was attended by Ziyad al-Nakhalah, who had replaced him as head of the PIJ movement.

== Books ==
His writings include:

- Iqtiṣādīyāt al-mālīyah al-ʻāmmah wa-al-niẓām al-mālī fī al-Islām, al-Jāmiʻāt al-Islāmiyah, 1984, 359 p. On Islamic economics, particularly public finance.
- al-Gharb wa-al-ṣirāʻ ʻalá Filasṭīn fī al-qarn al-ḥādī wa-al-ʻishrīn, Markaz Filasṭīn lil-Dirāsāt wa-al-Buḥūth, 1999, 35 p. On the West when it comes to the Palestinian struggle.
- Fī ʻayn al-ʻāṣifah : al-ḥiwār al-hāmm wa-al-shāmil alladhī ajratʹhu ṣaḥīfat al-Ḥayāh al-Landanīyah maʻa Amīn ʻĀmm Ḥarakat al-Jihād al-Islāmī fī Filasṭīn al-Duktūr Ramaḍān ʻAbd Allāh Shallaḥ, Bisan, 2003, 112 p. Interviews.
