= Specially Designated Terrorist =

Designation under U.S. law

A Specially Designated Terrorist (SDT) is a person who has been designated by the U.S. secretary of the treasury to be a specially designated terrorist under notices or regulations issued by the Office of Foreign Assets Control (OFAC), under the U.S. Treasury Department.

Executive Order 12947, issued by President Bill Clinton on January 23, 1995, prohibits financial transactions with SDTs. Twelve organizations and 18 people were identified in the Order as threatening disruption of the Middle East peace process. The U.S. secretary of the treasury and the U.S. attorney general were given the power to add other organizations and people to the list.

The U.S. government began to impose economic sanctions against international terrorists in 1995. On January 25, 1995, Hamas and Hezbollah were listed as SDTs.

Thus the original twelve organizations were (as written in the Executive Order):

- Abu Nidal Organization (ANO)
- Democratic Front for the Liberation of Palestine (DFLP)
- Hizballah
- Islamic Gama’at (IG)
- Islamic Resistance Movement (HAMAS)
- Jihad
- Kach
- Kahane Chai
- Palestinian Islamic Jihad – Shiqaqi faction (PIJ)
- Palestine Liberation Front – Abu Abbas faction (PLF-Abu Abbas)
- Popular Front for the Liberation of Palestine (PFLP)
- Popular Front for the Liberation of Palestine – General Command (PFLP–GC)

Mousa Abu Marzook was added in August 1995. On August 20, 1998, President Clinton expanded the list by Executive Order 13099. Osama bin Laden was added in 1998, and on December 4, 2001, the Holy Land Foundation was also designated. On February 28, 2006, Sami Al-Arian signed a plea agreement in which he agreed to plead guilty to one count of conspiracy to contribute services to or for the benefit of the Palestinian Islamic Jihad, a SDT organization, in violation of 18 U.S.C. § 371; he was sentenced to 57 months in prison. Ziyad al-Nakhalah, the leader of the Palestinian Islamic Jihad, was designated a SDT in January 2014.

The SDT list appears in the Federal Register, which is updated regularly.

== Consequences ==
All of the assets of all SDTs were frozen. In addition, transfers of "funds, goods, or services" to SDTs were prohibited. Also, any U.S. entity that holds any funds in which any interest is held in an SDT was required under the law to report its interest to appropriate U.S. authorities. The sanctions apply to any entity "owned or controlled by", or acting on behalf of, an SDT. They also apply to foreign branches of U.S. entities, but not to subsidiaries formed under non-U.S. law.

== See also ==
- Specially Designated Global Terrorist
- United States State Department list of Foreign Terrorist Organizations
- United States and state-sponsored terrorism
