= Al-Hayat =

Pan-Arab newspaper in London (1946–2020)

Al Hayat الحياة
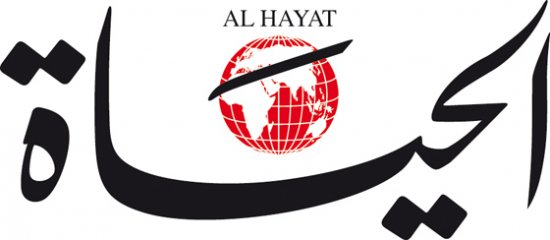
- Type: Daily newspaper
- Format: Broadsheet
- Owners: Khalid bin Sultan; Dar al-Hayat
- Editor: Saud Al Rayes
- Founded: 1946
- Ceased publication: March 2020
- Headquarters: London
- Circulation: 150,000 (as of 2009)
- Price: Varies by country Less than US$1.00 throughout the Arab world
- ISSN: 0967-5590
- Website: alhayat.com ^{archived}

Al-Hayat (Arabic: الحياة, lit. 'life') was an Arabic newspaper founded in 1946. Based in Beirut until 1976, the publication moved to London after its refounding in 1988. It was a pan-Arab newspaper owned by Saudi Prince Khalid bin Sultan, that had a circulation estimated over 200,000. It was the newspaper of record for the Arab diaspora and the preferred venue for liberal intellectuals who wished to express themselves to a large public. Founded in 1946, the paper closed in March 2020 after years of financial problems.

Though rather pro-West and pro-Saudi with respect to articles concerning the Arabian Peninsula, it was quite open to various opinions concerning other regional questions. Al-Hayat printed in London, New York, Frankfurt, Dubai, Riyadh, Jeddah, Dammam, Beirut and Cairo. The newspaper operated offices in London, Paris, Washington, New York, Moscow, Riyadh, Jeddah, Beirut, Cairo, Baghdad, Dubai, Amman, and Damascus, among others.

The newspaper was "regarded as by far and away the best and most intensely read Arab newspaper", according to a 1997 article in The New York Times. A 2005 article in the same paper described Al-Hayat as a "decidedly Arab nationalist paper". The newspaper was distributed in most Arab countries, and most of its editors were from Lebanon, where Al-Hayat was very popular. It was more critical of the Saudi government than its main rival, Asharq Al-Awsat.

The newspaper's motto was "Life is belief and struggle" (Arabic: إن الحياة عقيدة وجهاد), a line taken from a poem by Egyptian poet Ahmed Shawki.

== History ==
=== Origins: Lebanese daily ===
The original Al-Hayat started as a Lebanese daily newspaper. It was founded by Kamel Mrowa, a Lebanese publisher, journalist, writer and ideologue, in Beirut on 28 January 1946. (He named his daughter, Hayat Mrowa (now Hayat Palumbo, Lady Palumbo), after the newspaper.) The paper had a pro-Shia stance, but was one of the critics of the Shia leader Musa Al Sadr. It had also an anti-Gamal Abdel Nasser and conservative stance. On 16 May 1966 as Mrowa checked final proofs for the next day's edition, an assassin walked into Al-Hayat Beirut offices and shot him to death. Although the assassin's motive was never conclusively determined, investigators linked the shooting to the newspaper's criticism of the Arab nationalist movement. The publication survived 13 bombing attempts before the Lebanese Civil War finally forced it to shut down in 1976.

=== Refounding and new ownership ===
Al-Hayat was restarted by Jamil Mrowa and Adel Bishtawi in 1988. The paper was bought in 1988 by the Saudi Prince Khalid bin Sultan. Owing to the newly relaunched newspaper's majority Christian Lebanese and Christian Palestinian management, critics dubbed Al-Hayat "a newspaper of minorities in the service of a prince," especially after publishing criticisms by Kurds and Shiites opposed to Saddam Hussein. "Its ownership by Prince Khalid has meant that the paper treads softly when it comes to disquieting news about Saudi Arabia, a notable exception to its independent stand," according to a 1997 article in The New York Times.

=== Al Hayat in the 1990s ===
In May 1993, the newspaper scooped every other news organization by breaking the news about the secret Oslo talks between Palestinians and Israelis. Al-Hayat also initiated a joint news-gathering operation in the mid-1990s with the Saudi-connected Lebanese Broadcasting Corporation. In 1996 the Beirut offices of Al Hayat were closed.

By 1997, Al-Hayat received criticism from its Arab readers for establishing a bureau in Jerusalem. As of that year, the newspaper had a daily circulation of about 200,000 and was staffed by Muslim, Christian and Druze editors and reporters who formed "a highly professional team", according to a report in The New York Times. The Times report described the newspaper as a source of "iconoclastic interviews" and "having the most influential cultural pages anywhere in the Arab world, and opening opinion pages to radical reactionary Muslim fundamentalists and virulent anti-religious liberals, pro-Iraqi [under the Saddam Hussein regime) Arab nationalists as well as conservative gulf Arabs." Edward Said of Columbia University was a frequent contributor.

In January 1997, at least 14 letter bombs were mailed to the newspaper's headquarters in London and its bureaus in New York, Washington and Riyadh. Two security guards were wounded by one of the bombs as it exploded at the headquarters.

=== 2002 ban in Saudi Arabia ===
On 23 October 2002, Saudi censors banned Al-Hayat because the edition contained an open letter from 67 American intellectuals that defended the war on terror, and called upon their Saudi counterparts to condemn "militant jihadism" and to further delegitimize the concept by calling such actions un-Islamic. The publication was part of an exchange between American intellectuals—including Samuel P. Huntington, Francis Fukuyama, and Daniel Patrick Moynihan—and counterparts in the Europe and the Middle East over the moral foundation for the Bush administration's war against terrorism, with the first letter entitled "What We're Fighting For" published in February 2002 during the U.S. invasion of Afghanistan. A group of 153 largely conservative and Wahhabi Saudi scholars had responded in May 2002, in a column entitled "How We Can Coexist," arguing that while Islam does indeed forbid violence against innocent civilians, the root cause of the 11 September attacks was unjust American foreign policy. The American rebuttal, which prompted the one-day Saudi ban of Al-Hayat, insisted that the blame rested squarely upon the governments and societies of the region: "We ask you sincerely to reconsider the tendency ... to blame everyone but your own leaders and your own society for the problems that your society faces,"

=== 2007 ban in Saudi Arabia ===
In late August 2007, the Saudi government banned distribution of Al-Hayat within the Kingdom for less than a week. The ban was a culmination of weeks of extended tension between the newspaper and the Saudi information ministry, which the paper's staff alleged to have ordered Al-Hayat to drop columnist Abdul Aziz Suwaid, who had written a number of columns criticizing the government for inefficiencies, including a wave of mysterious deaths among camel populations. In addition to criticism of the agricultural ministry's handling of the camel's death, the paper had also run articles critical of the health ministry after the death of a girl following a medical operation. Other reports attributed the ban to the paper's disclosure that a Saudi extremist had played a key role in an Iraqi al-Qa'ida front group. Although the government and paper both refused to officially comment, a private distribution firm in the kingdom, the National Company of Distribution, told the Associated Press that it had been told not to distribute the paper. The Saudi edition of the newspaper—with a circulation of 200,000 in Saudi Arabia at the time—did not appear on newsstands for at least three days, with an anonymous source in the Riyadh office telling the Financial Times that the paper had been told it had "crossed a red line."

=== 2011 reporting on Hamas decampment from Syria ===
On 30 April 2011, Al-Hayat reported that Hamas had taken the decision to leave Syria, citing unnamed Palestinian sources. The article added that-while sources in Gaza reported the refusal of both Jordan and Egypt to host the organization—Qatar had agreed to host its political leadership (though not its military leadership, which the article stated would likely return to Gaza), and that Hamas's political leader Khaled Mashal would be departing Damascus shortly to take up residence in Doha. On 1 May, Al-Hayat published a short item noting that a member of Hamas's political bureau in Damascus had issued a statement denying any intent to leave Syria, quoted in the article as stating that Hamas "is still operating from Damascus, and what the media said in this regard is completely false."

The New York Times reported on the allegations the following day, citing the reports in Al Hayat as evidence of strained relations between Hamas and the Syrian government, as a result of the 2011 Syrian uprising. Anonymous Hamas officials cited pressure from the government to take a clear stance against the protests. While the political leadership again publicly denied any reports of an impending move—telling the Times "there is nothing to this report in Al Hayat that we are going to Qatar," and "it is absolutely not true"—a Syrian historian at an Ohio university, citing contact with sources in Damascus, said that the "Hamas leadership was definitely examining its options, looking at other countries in which it might settle."

=== 2020 closure ===
In 2018, the paper suspended its print edition and closed its offices in London, Cairo, Dubai, and Beirut. At some points, Al-Hayat failed to pay its staff their salaries for months at a time. In 2019, the paper stopped updating its website, and in March 2020 the editor-in-chief announced the paper's official closure.

Some Middle East watchers speculated that Al-Hayat's financial difficulties stemmed from the pressure campaign that Mohammed bin Salman, the crown prince of Saudi Arabia, was waging on his potential rivals. Al-Hayat owner Khalid bin Sultan Al Saud is the son of Sultan bin Abdulaziz, the former crown prince of Saudi Arabia and younger brother of King Salman. Other sources argue that Al-Hayat simply failed to compete in a challenging media environment.

== Organization ==
Al-Hayat was organized under the larger umbrella of Dar al-Hayat (Arabic: دار الحياة "Publishing House of Life"). Its website www.daralhayat.com hosted the content of three different publications: Al-Hayat (International Edition), published daily in a 24-page spread; Al-Hayat KSA (Saudi Edition) published over 48 pages on weekdays and 36 pages on weekends; and a weekly woman's magazine Laha (Arabic: لها "For Her").

=== Masthead ===
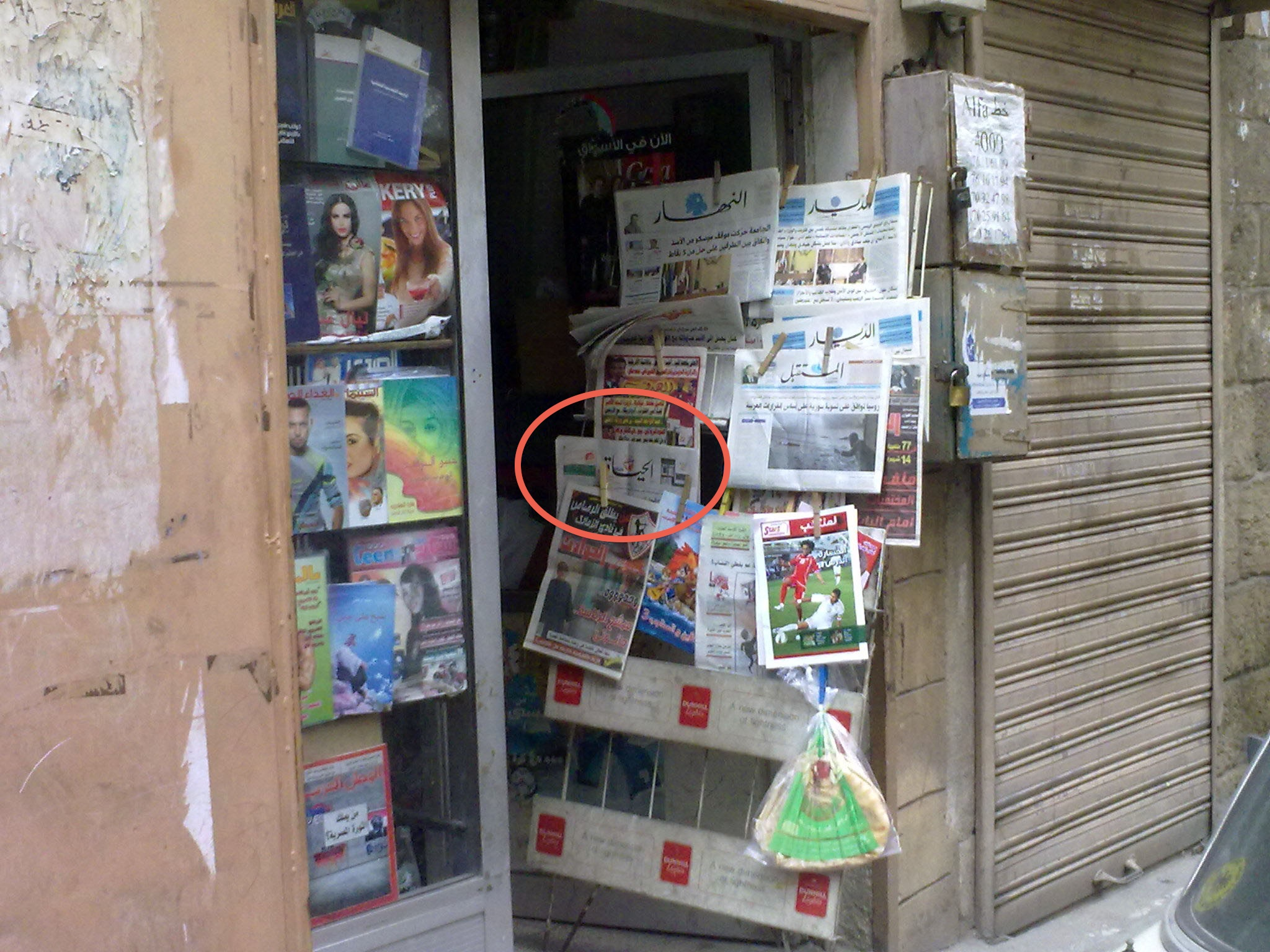
Al-Hayat on display in Tripoli, Lebanon, 2012

While Saud Al Rayes held the position of editor in chief, Jameel Theyabi was the assistant editor in chief of the Saudi Edition, which was launched in 2005, and has increased circulation in Saudi Arabia from 20,000 to almost 200,000. Additionally, Hassan Haidar served as managing editors in Britain, Zouheir Qoseibati in Lebanon, Raja Rassi as director general and Gilbert Mayni as finance controller.

=== Bureaus ===
Although Al Hayat was headquartered in London—the principal location for its editorial, administrative, distribution, and subscriptions offices—the paper also maintained offices in Paris, Washington, DC, New York City, Moscow, Riyadh, Jeddah, Dammam, Beirut, Cairo, Baghdad, and Damascus.

The three offices in Saudi Arabia reflected the paper's focus on the country as well as the regional division into central (Riyadh), west (Jeddah), and eastern (Dammam) editions.

In June 2018, the Beirut bureau closed due to financial difficulties and the Al-Hayat stopped printing its Lebanese edition.

=== Contents ===
The international 24-page edition generally contained eight pages of political news (with marked differences from the front page focus of the Saudi edition). The publication also included standard sections such as the features page, the opinion page, an extensive business section (4 pages), a culture and arts page, and a sports section (2 pages), in addition to other rotating sections on youth, as well as a miscellaneous section. On Sundays, the paper published a special supplement called Trends (Arabic: تيارات literally, "Currents"), which published two additional pages of criticism and analysis from a variety of viewpoints.

=== Prominent columnists ===
Many columnists contributed to the op-ed pages of Al-Hayat ever since it has been relaunched in 1988. Among them are Hazem Saghieh, Abdulwahab Badraghan, Zouhair Koussaibati, Hassan Haidar, Raghida Dargham, Randa Takieddine, Walid Choucair, Salim Nassar, Abdel-Rahman Ayas, Khalid al-Dakhil, a political sociologist and writer, Jamal Khashoggi, who used to be the editor-in-chief of another Saudi paper, Al Watan. Among Saudi female columnists in the Saudi-Gulf edition are Dalia Gazaz, Badriyah Al- Bisher, and Thuraia Al Shihri. The assistant editor in chief of the Saudi-Gulf edition of Al Hayat in 2013 is Jameel Al-Dhiyabi. Jihad Al Khazen, who was also the founding editor in chief of the rival pan-Arab newspaper Asharq Alawsat, writes a twice weekly column called "Ayoon wa Azan" (Arabic: عيون وآذان "Eyes and Ears") featured on the back page. George Semaan, the former editor in chief writes a political column weekly. Their columns along with selections from other regular columnists are routinely translated into English and made available on the paper's website.

== Editions ==
=== International edition ===
Al-Hayat was established by its founder Kamel Mroueh in Beirut on 28 January 1946 as an independent international Arabic daily political newspaper. Its publisher reaffirmed those origins on reviving it in 1988, with London as its base. It collects news through a network of correspondents worldwide and is printed in Arab and Western cities linked by satellite to the London offices. Normally 32 pages, it sometimes expands with supplements and special editions.

It was a pioneer among Arabic newspapers in form, mixed news and commentary, professional editing and use of modern communication technology. Like other newspapers, it competed with television news, social media and fast-paced internet information sources.

=== Saudi edition ===
In 2005, Al-Hayat inaugurated a Saudi edition based in Riyadh. Its three daily editions cover local affairs in Jeddah, Riyadh and Dammam in addition to international news from the Arab world.

=== Digital edition ===
Al Hayat started a digital service in October 2002, with a web site accessible worldwide. In May 2012, the digital service began serving mobile media, tablets and mobile phones with interactive features.

=== Information Center House ===
The Information Center was established in 1988 with the re-location of Al-Hayat newspaper to London. Then the center was moved to Beirut in 2000.

All outputs of Dar Al-Hayat be it in publication form or electronic were indexed and archived and available them available.

==== Archives and documentation ====
- Lebanese Al-Hayat newspaper in the form of image pages: 1946–1976
- Al-Hayat in the form of image pages: 1988–
- Al-Hayat newspaper – International Edition: Archives of letter: 1994
- Al-Hayat newspaper – International Edition: PDF pages: 2000–
- Al-Hayat newspaper – Riyadh edition: Archives: 2007–
- Al-Hayat English language edition. April 2006–
- Magazine center-stalled publication: electronic archive: 1994–2004
- Laha supplement magazine: Archives: 2008–
