= Palestinian Islamic Jihad =

Palestinian political party paramilitary force

Islamic Jihad Movement in Palestine حركة الجهاد الإسلامي في فلسطين
- PIJ logo
- Other name: Palestinian Islamic Jihad
- Founders: Abd Al Aziz Awda; Fathi Shaqaqi
- Leaders: Fathi Shaqaqi (1981–1995) X Ramadan Shalah (1995–2018); Ziyad al-Nakhalah (2018–present)
- Dates active: October 1981 – present
- Split from: Egyptian Islamic Jihad
- Country: Palestine
- Active regions: Palestine; Lebanon; Syria
- Ideology: Palestinian nationalism Islamic nationalism Sunni Islamism; Islamic fundamentalism Sunni-Shia unity Anti-Zionism; Vanguardism; Anti-semitism
- Size: 4,000 (July 2026)
- Part of: Palestinian Joint Operations Room; Alliance of Palestinian Forces; Axis of Resistance

The Islamic Jihad Movement in Palestine (Arabic: حركة الجهاد الإسلامي في فلسطين, Ḥarakat al-Jihād al-Islāmi fi Filastīn), commonly known simply as Palestinian Islamic Jihad (PIJ), (Note: Also known as: Abu Ghunaym Squad of the Hizballah Bayt Al-Maqdis, al-Awdah Brigades, al-Quds Brigades, al-Quds Squads, Islamic Holy War, Islamic Jihad, Islamic Jihad–Palestine Faction, Islamic Jihad in Palestine, Islamic Jihad of Palestine, Islamic Jihad Palestine, Palestine Islamic Jihad–Shallah Faction, Palestine Islamic Jihad–Shaqaqi Faction) is an Islamist Palestinian paramilitary organization formed in 1981.

PIJ formed as an offshoot of Egyptian Islamic Jihad and was influenced ideologically in its formation by the Islamic Revolution in Iran. It is a member of the Alliance of Palestinian Forces, which rejects the Oslo Accords and whose objective is the establishment of a sovereign Islamic Palestinian state. It calls for the military destruction of Israel and rejects a two-state solution. The organization's financial backing has historically come mainly from Iran, Syria and Hezbollah. Since 2014, PIJ has seen its power steadily increase with the backing of funds from Iran. PIJ has notably participated in the ongoing Gaza war (2023–present), fighting alongside Hamas and other allied Palestinian factions.

The armed wing of PIJ is Al-Quds Brigades (also known as "Saraya"), also formed in 1981, which is active in the West Bank and the Gaza Strip, with its main strongholds in the West Bank being the cities of Hebron and Jenin. Its operations have included suicide bombings, attacks on Israeli civilians, as well as the firing of rockets into Israel, targeting civilians. PIJ has been designated a terrorist organization by the United States, the European Union, the United Kingdom, Canada, Australia, New Zealand, Israel, and Japan.

PIJ is considered by Israel the most extreme Palestinian militant organization in its methods and its ideology.

In 2026, PIJ militants consented to the Board of Peace's disarmament plan for Gaza.

== History and background ==
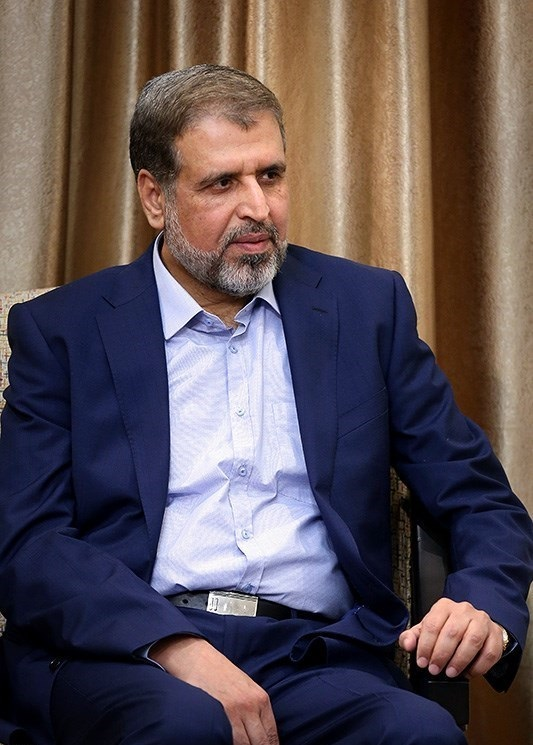
Ramadan Abdullah Mohammad Shallah was wanted by the FBI for conspiracy to conduct the affairs of the designated international terrorist organization known as the "Palestinian Islamic Jihad".

=== Establishment ===
PIJ was formally established in Gaza in 1981 by six Palestinian activists, most notably: Fathi abd al-Aziz Shaqaqi, a Rafah-based physician, Shaykh Abd al-Aziz Awda, an Islamic preacher from the Jabaliyya refugee camp, as well as Ramadan Shalah, Bashir Moussa. Based in Egypt, Shaqaqi and Awda were originally members of the Muslim Brotherhood. Their views on the necessity of the destruction of Israel led them in 1979 to establish the Egyptian Islamic Jihad branch Egyptian Islamic Jihad-Shaqaqi Faction and conduct militant operations out of Egypt. After the assassination of Anwar Sadat, the Egyptian president the Shaqaqi faction was expelled from Egypt due to Egypt uncovering the groups connections to the perpetrators. Shaqaqi and Awda returned to Gaza where they formally established PIJ, from where it continued its operations.

The aim of the organization was the establishment of a sovereign Islamic Palestinian state within the geographic borders of pre-1948 Mandatory Palestine. Completely rejecting the political process, the organization professes that its goals can only be achieved through military means. PIJ began its armed operations against Israel in 1984. Palestinian Islamic Jihad only announced its existence publicly on December 11th 1987, but its existence was already widely known.

=== Intifada era ===
During the First Intifada PIJ would use both terrorism and civil resistance, initially the PIJ had only 300 members but they had far more ideological supporters which gave them disproportionate influence for their size. Early in the Intifada it seemed likely that the group would merge with the PLO largely due to their mutual initial disapproval of violence at the time. But this never happened because the UNLU disliked the PIJ and prevented the merger, though the groups still cooperated periodically. In the first month of the Intifada it was very active in organizing and calling for protests but after the start of 1988 the groups decreased in activity and was crippled in March 1988 when the IDF arrested many of the leaders and members. It took the group until Fall of 1988 to regroup and after it did it took on a more militant approach and ended its relationship with the PLO.

In 1988, its leaders were exiled by Israel to Lebanon. While in Lebanon, the group received training, support and other backing from Hezbollah and its backers in Iran, and developed a close relationship with the organization. In 1990, the headquarters of PIJ moved to the Syrian capital, Damascus, where it continues to be based, with offices in Beirut, Tehran, and Khartoum. PIJ masterminded several suicide attacks in Israel. From the late 80's to mid 90's PIJ had a rivalry with Hamas as they competed for sway over more radical Palestinians, though as time went on they would grow closer.

By 1993 PIJ had reached its strongest point yet, but the establishment of the Palestinian Authority and the Oslo Accords marked a severe downturn in the groups fortunes. Renewed hope in peace among Palestinian led to a crash in the popularity of PIJ, which continued to advocate a violent approach, while security co-operation between Israel and the PA led to many PIJ members and leader being killed or imprisoned, by the late 1990's the movement had been nearly wiped out. The Second Intifada though allowed for a resurgence in the group, growing lawlessness and a breakdown in Israel-PA cooperation eased military pressure while the Palestinian populace had shifted to a more violent mentality. But as Israeli counterinsurgency efforts picked up steam the Second Intifada came to an end the group was once again but on the defensive, being temporarily eliminated from the West Bank by 2005.

=== Post-Intifadas ===
During the 2006 Palestinian legislative elections and subsequent Battle of Gaza, PIJ believed that internal division would weaken the Palestinian movement and that Palestinian violence's only legitimate target was Israel and so worked with the PFLP and DFLP to mend ties between Fatah and Hamas.

In February 2012, the Hamas government in the Gaza Strip distanced itself from PIJ. During the March 2012 Gaza–Israel clashes, which followed the Israeli assassination of Popular Resistance Committees leader, Zuhir al-Qaisi, who bragged of kidnapping Gilad Shalit, PIJ and PRC opened attacks on Israel. Hamas refrained from joining PIJ and PRC in attacking Israel. Over a hundred Palestinians were killed or injured in the ensuing violence, but no Hamas targets were killed. The subsequent ceasefire was negotiated between Israel and the militant groups, not Hamas.

In May 2015, London-based Arabic newspaper Asharq al-Awsat reported that Iran had stopped funding PIJ due to the group's neutrality over the Saudi Arabian-led intervention in Yemen, throwing PIJ into a severe financial crisis. Iran had expected PIJ to condemn the intervention led by Saudi Arabia, Iran's chief regional rival. Palestinian newspaper al-Quds reported that Iran began supporting an offshoot of PIJ called as-Sabirin (Arabic for "the patient ones"), headed by Islamic Jihad veteran Hisham Salem.

Under the former leadership of Ramadan Shalah, the group would receive approximately US$70 million per year from the Islamic Revolutionary Guard Corps of Iran.

In 2021 the Jenin Brigade, an umbrella group of various militant groups in Jenin, of which PIJ is a part of would be founded. In 2022 the Tulkarm Brigade, Nablus Brigade, Tubas Brigade, Nur Shams Brigade, Qabatiya Brigade would be founded as similar local umbrella groups. And in 2023 the Ramallah Brigade would be founded, which unlike the other brigades only consisted of PIJ.

In 2026, PIJ militants agreed to the Board of Peace disarmament plan for Gaza.

=== United States PIJ interactions ===
On 20 February 2003, University of South Florida computer engineering professor Sami Al-Arian was arrested after being indicted on a terrorism-related charge. U.S. attorney general John Ashcroft alleged at a press conference that Al-Arian was the North American head of the Palestinian Islamic Jihad. On 6 December 2006, Sami Al-Arian was sentenced to 57 months in prison, pursuant to a plea bargain. In November 2006 he was found guilty of civil contempt for refusing to testify before a federal grand jury and served 21 months in prison on that conviction. On 27 June 2014, the US Federal Government dropped all charges against Al-Arian. On 23 January 1995, the founder of PIJ, Abd Al Aziz Awda, was indicted under United States law and added in 2006 to the United States FBI Most Wanted Terrorists list.

On June 30th 2026 Catherine Beth Washburn the leader of Direct Action Movement for Palestinian Liberation an anti-Zionist domestic extremist group was arrested for donating $30,116 to PIJ. She expressed extremist, antisemitic, and anti-Zionist views.

== Ideology, motives and beliefs ==
=== Goals and Methods ===
In a series of by-laws PIJ identified it's aims as such:

1. The Islamization of Palestinian identity
2. The instigation of general popular revolution amongst Palestinians against Israel
3. The realization of the Islamic unity through collective jihad
4. The destruction of Israel

The group also identified its methods as such:

1. The creation of a "state of terror, instability, and panic in the souls of Zionists and especially the groups of settlers, forcing them to leave their homes"
2. The creation of a "psychological barrier between Jews and the Muslim Palestinian people” and the “conviction that coexistence is impossible.”

=== Anti-Zionism ===
Palestinian Islamic Jihad's ideological foundations lie in a synthesis of Palestinian Nationalism, which it viewed as too secular, and Jihadi Islamism, which it viewed as not focused enough on Palestine, combining the two into a Islam focused Palestinian Nationalism. Yehudit Barsky, a Middle East counterterrorism specialist, explains that the PIJ views itself as “revolutionary vanguard" who have taken up the responsibility of purifying the Islamic world by eliminating all western influence within it. They believe that Israel is the primary western outpost in the Muslim World through which it disseminates its anti-islamic influence. In these goals the PIJ believes that terrorism and the intentional killing of civilians are acceptable practices and that "Jihad is the solution to liberate Palestine and topple the Infidel regimes".

In his 2007 book Facts and Stances PIJ’s second secretary-general Ramadan Abdallah Shallah, explained the three reasons Palestine is the groups primary focus in what it views as an international Islamic struggle.

the religious and legal dimension, which presents Palestine in the religion as a blessed land in the text of the Qur’an This dimension also shows the inevitability of confrontation between us and the Jews, and this is what is confirmed by the Qur’an and the sunna, in particular by surat al-isra’...

The second is the historical dimension that places the Zionist offensive within the context of war, the Jews as historical enemies, and their cunning against the religion since the emergence of the [Arabic script] until the present day. it also includes the Western enemies since the Battle of Muta and Tabuk via the crusader wars down to the inculcation of the Zionist entity into the heart of the umma, Palestine. That is, the Zionist entity as the spearhead of the Western project, and as the culmination of its recent attack on the Islamic East, which began as the campaign of Napoleon in the late eighteenth century...

The third is the de facto dimension, appearing through what "Israel" represents in current reality as a colonialist base and military barracks to protect Western and American interests in the region, and through what is caused by its presence and role in the region. "Israel" is thus a threat not only to Palestine but also to the whole umma.

In 2009 interview with Al-Jazeera, Ramadan Abdullah Shallah rejected the two-state solution, said "the one-state solution is better than the two-state solution" and accused the Palestinian Authority of being complicit with the Israeli occupation.

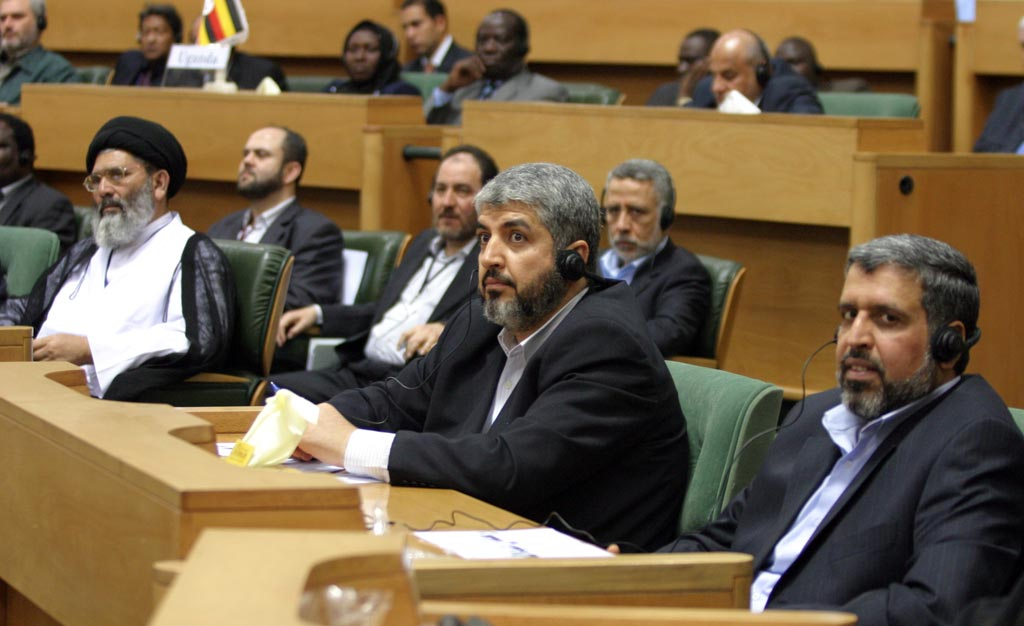
PIJ's founder Ramadan Shalah (right) and Hamas leader Khaled Mashal in Tehran, Iran, 14 April 2006

In a 2002 book, Yonah Alexander wrote that PIJ calls for the destruction of Israel, rejects the option of a peaceful settlement with Israel, and advocates the use of guerrilla tactics to achieve that aim. Israel's eradication is viewed as an essential prerequisite for addressing the challenges facing the Muslim world. It envisions laying the groundwork for a future scenario in which a significant Islamic Arab army engages in military confrontation to achieve Israel's destruction. The PIJ has been accountable for some of the deadliest suicide attacks in Israel.

Unlike Hamas, which engages in unofficial talks with Israel in matters such as ceasefire negotiations and prisoner exchanges. PIJ absolutely and entirely rejects any negotiations with Israel.

=== Islamic Fundamentalism ===
The group is a Sunni Jihadist movement but includes other religious beliefs. PIJ is a proponent of Sunni-Shia unity and reconciliation, believing that the divisions between the two sects are only a minor issue to be ignored to focus on the conflict against Israel and the West.

After the destruction of Israel, PIJ ideology calls for the restoration of an Islamist caliphate in the style of the Rashidun and Umayyad Caliphates. Some PIJ thinkers have said that this caliphate would then go on to destroy the West, but the group as a whole has not adopted this idea. PIJ ideas for after the destruction of Israel are much less developed compared to other aspects of their beliefs.

== Organization ==
Palestinians Islamic Jihad is governed by a council of 15 members headed by a secretary-general whom the council elects. 9 of the council members are elected from within the organization reportedly every four years, 2 are appointed by the secretary-general, and 4 are chosen by the other 11 members.

PIJ leadership has been based in Syria since 1989, though rumors exist that the leadership relocated to Iran in 2012, though this is denied by the group. A US report claims that PIJ leadership is dispersed throughout the middle east, though with many being based in Lebanon.

The groups military wing, the al-Quds Brigades is divided into geographically based brigades each of which is overseen by a regional staff command. The brigades are then further subdivided into cells each of which is operated by a single member of the brigades regional staff command.

== Activities ==
=== Militant activities ===
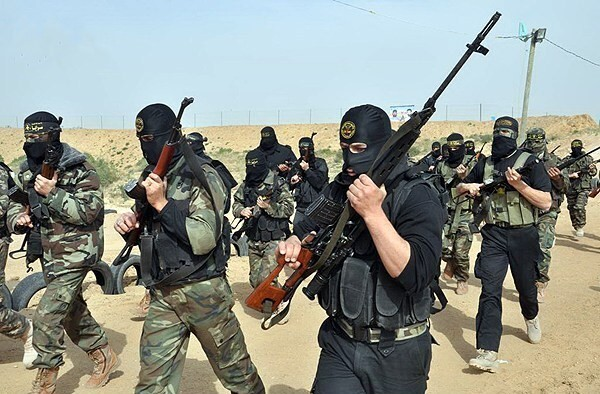
Training of al-Quds Brigades snipers in Gaza, 25 December 2013

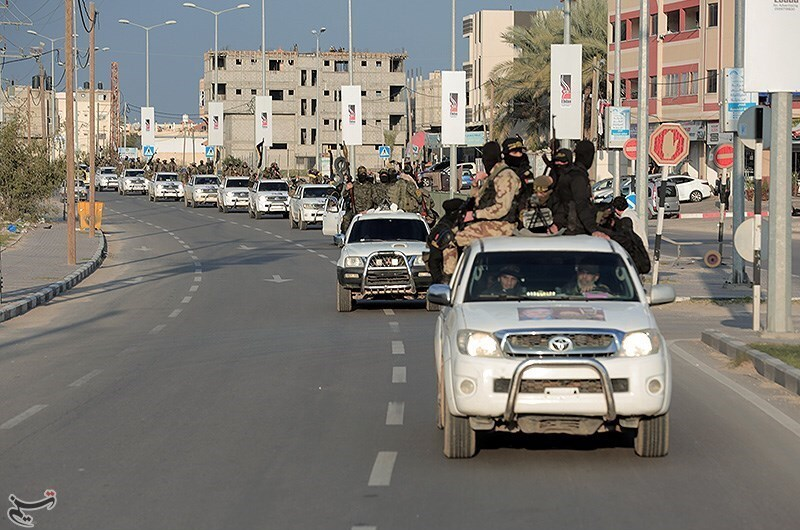
Al-Quds Brigades weapons exhibition/parade, Gaza Strip, 7 January 2022

The Palestinian Islamic Jihad pledges that armed resistance will continue as long as Israel maintains the occupation and conducts military operations against Palestinians. Nonetheless, it states "the decision to end resistance belongs to that of the people". PIJ has employed suicide bombing as a tactic in realization that Palestinian military capabilities are outmatched by Israeli sophisticated weaponry. Its objectives are to "maximum[ize] amount of loss to the Israeli military". PIJ states that their policy is that targeting innocent civilians is prohibited. However, it allows for targeting Israeli civilians in response to Israeli targeting of Palestinian civilians. Nevertheless, PIJ states that in such scenarios they prioritize targeting the Israeli military over targeting civilians. Finally, PIJ states they reject any use of force against non-Israelis. PIJ has also deployed its own rocket, similar to the Qassam rocket used by Hamas, called the al-Quds rocket.

==== List of attacks ====
- August 1987: The PIJ claimed responsibility for a shooting that killed the commander of the Israeli military police in the Gaza Strip.
- July 1989: Attack of Egged bus 405 along the Jerusalem–Tel Aviv highway, at least 14 people killed (including two Canadians and one American) and dozens more wounded. Though intended to be a suicide attack, the perpetrator survived.
- 4 February 1990: A bus carrying Israeli tourists in Egypt was attacked. The attack left 11 people, including 9 Israelis, dead and 17 others injured.
- February 1992: In the Night of the Pitchforks, PIJ members killed three Israeli soldiers asleep in their base, using knives, axes and a pitchfork.
- 6 April 1992: An Israeli Army convoy was ambushed in Hula, South Lebanon. Two soldiers were killed and five wounded. The target had been Major-General Yitzhak Mordechai, head of Israel's Northern Command, who had left the convoy earlier. Three of the attackers were killed.
- December 1993: David Mashrati, an Israeli reserve soldier, was shot and killed by a terrorist at the Holon Junction. The PIJ claimed responsibility for the attack.
- April 1994: A PIJ member attacked a group of Israelis waiting for a bus at the city of Ashdod, killing one and injuring others.
- January 1995: Bomb attack near Netanya killing eighteen soldiers and one civilian.
- April 1995: Bomb Attack in Netzarim and Kfar Darom. The first bomb killed 8 people including American student, Alisa Flatow, and injured over 30 on an Israel bus; the second attack was a car bomb that injured 12 people.
- March 1996: A Tel Aviv shopping mall is the site of another bombing killing 20 and injuring 75.
- November 2000: A car bomb in Jerusalem at an outdoor market killed two people and injured ten.
- March 2002: A bomb killed seven people and injured approximately thirty aboard a bus travelling from Tel Aviv to Nazareth.
- June 2002: Eighteen people are killed and fifty injured in an attack at the Megiddo Junction.
- July 2002: A double attack in Tel Aviv killed five people and injured forty.
- November 2002: Twelve soldiers and security personnel killed in an ambush in Hebron.
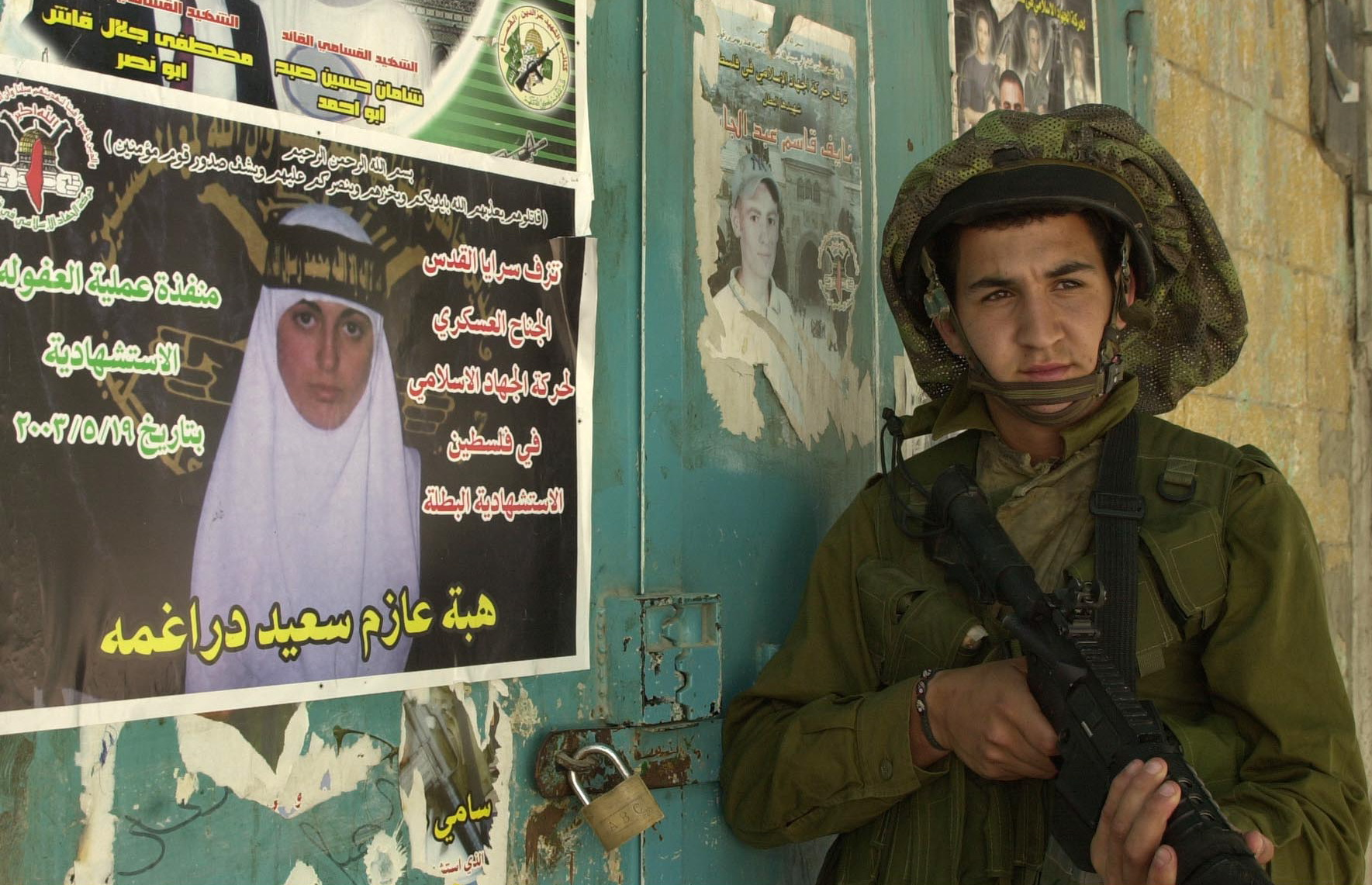
  After the Afula mall bombing, PIJ stated that the suicide bomber was a 19-year-old Palestinian female student named Hiba Daraghmeh.
- May 2003: Three people killed and eighty-three injured in a suicide bombing at a shopping mall in Afula.
- August 2003: A bomber killed 21 people and injured more than 100 people on a bus in Jerusalem.
- October 2003: PIJ affiliated suicide bomber Hanadi Jaradat detonated an explosive belt inside a restaurant in Haifa, killing 21 Israelis and wounding 60 others.
- October 2005: Palestinian suicide bomber detonated an explosive device in a Hadera market, killing seven people and injuring 55, five of them severely.
- April 2006: A bomb in a Tel Aviv eatery killed eleven and injured 70.
- January 2007: Both the al-Aqsa Martyrs' Brigades and the PIJ claim responsibility for a suicide bombing at an Eilat bakery that killed three.
- June 2007: In a failed assault on an IDF position at the Kissufim crossing between Gaza and Israel in a possible attempt to kidnap IDF soldiers, four armed members of the al-Quds Brigades (the military wing of Islamic Jihad) and the al-Aqsa Martyrs' Brigades (the military wing of Fatah) allegedly used a vehicle marked with "TV" and "PRESS" insignias penetrated the border fence and assaulted a guard tower in what Islamic Jihad and the army said was a failed attempt to capture an Israeli soldier. IDF troops killed one militant, while the others escaped. The use of a vehicle that resembled a press vehicle evoked a sharp response from many journalists and news organizations. The Middle East director for Human Rights Watch Sarah Leah Whitsonn responded, "Using a vehicle with press markings to carry out a military attack is a serious violation of the laws of war, and it also puts journalists at risk." The FPA responded by saying,

Armored vehicles marked with TV are an invaluable protection for genuine journalists working in hostile environments. The FPA has long campaigned for the continued availability of armored vehicles for its members, despite official opposition in some quarters. The abuse of this recognized protection for the working journalist is a grave development and we condemn those that carried it out. Such an incident will reduce the protection offered by marked vehicles.

During a press conference, an Islamic Jihad spokesperson Abu Ahmed denied that they had put press markings on the jeep used in the attack and said, "The Al-Quds Brigades used an armoured jeep resembling military armoured jeeps used by the Zionist intelligence services."

- On 26 March 2009, two Islamic Jihad members were imprisoned for a conspiracy "to murder Israeli pilots and scientists using booby-trapped toy cars".
- On 15 November 2012, Islamic Jihad fired two Fajr-5s at Tel Aviv from Gaza, one landing in an uninhabited area of the suburbs and the other in the sea.
- On 24 June 2013, six rockets were fired into Israel; major news outlets reported that the Islamic Jihad were behind the attacks.
- In March 2014 over 100 rockets were launched into southern Israel by PIJ and other Islamist groups. On 14 March Shalah announced that the attack was coordinated with Hamas.
- PIJ participated in the October 7 attacks, the impetus of the ongoing Gaza war, and has fought alongside Hamas and other allied Palestinian factions in subsequent battles inside the Gaza Strip.
- PIJ took responsibility for a ramming and stabbing attack in the Gush Etzion Junction on 18 November 2025.

=== Social services ===
Islamic Jihad also control dozens of religious organizations in the Palestinian territories that are registered as NGOs and operate mosques, schools, and medical facilities that offer free services. Like other Islamic associations, these are heavily scrutinized by the Palestinian National Authority who have shut some of them down. In one Islamic Jihad kindergarten graduation, children dressed up in military uniforms, waved guns, shouted anti-Israel slogans, and spoke of blowing themselves up to kill "Zionists".

Islamic Jihad also operates dozens of summer camps for children. They have opened up 51 summer camps which attracted approximately 10,000 children in 2010.

We teach the children the truth. How the Jews persecuted the prophets and tortured them. We stress that the Jews killed and slaughtered Arabs and Palestinians every chance they got. Most important, the children understand that the conflict with the Jews is not over land, but rather over religion. As long as Jews remain here, between the [Jordan] river and the [Mediterranean] sea, they will be our enemy and we will continue to pursue and kill them. When they leave we won't hurt them.

=== Funding ===
According to an Australian government report, PIJ's primary source of funding is Iranian support, but the groups also received support from Ba'athist Syria and receives donations from Palestinians. Iran has used its support for the PIJ as leverage against Hamas, when Hamas refused to support Ba'athist Syria in the Syrian Civil War Iran sent two million dollars of aid to PIJ instead of Hamas.

=== Child Soldiers ===
PIJ has used minors for its operations. On 29 March 2004, 15-year-old Tamer Khuweir of Rifidia, a suburb of the Palestinian city of Nablus in the West Bank, was captured by Israeli forces as he planned to carry out a suicide mission. His older brother claimed he was brainwashed and demanded the Palestinian Authority investigate the incident and arrest those responsible for it.

== Notable PIJ members ==
=== Secretaries-General ===
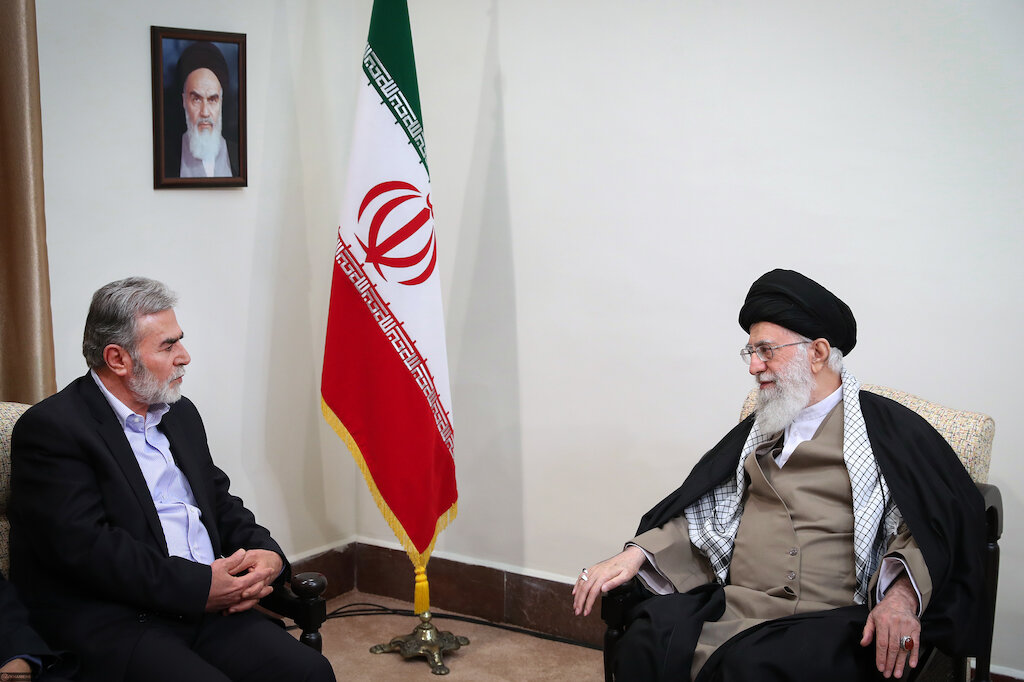
PIJ's Secretary-General Ziyad al-Nakhalah (left) with Iran's Ayatollah Ali Khamenei in Tehran, Iran, 31 December 2018

- Fathi Shaqaqi: founder of PIJ, 1981–1995, assassinated by Mossad gunmen.
- Ramadan Shalah: founder of PIJ, 1995–2018.
- Ziyad al-Nakhalah: 2018–present.

=== Other members ===
- Mahmoud Tawalbe: senior leader in Jenin, killed during Operation Defensive Shield by an IDF Caterpillar D9, 2002.
- Hanadi Jaradat: female suicide bomber, committed the Maxim restaurant suicide bombing, 4 October 2003.
- Mohammed Dadouh: senior commander in Gaza, assassinated by Israeli missile, 21 May 2006.
- Mahmoud al-Majzoub: member of the Shura Council, killed by car bomb, 26 May 2006.
- Husam Jaradat: senior commander in Jenin, cousin of Hanadi Jaradat, assassinated in the Jenin refugee quarters, 30 August 2006.
- Baha Abu al-Ata: leader killed by an Israeli missile strike in Gaza, 12 November 2019.
- Akram al-Ajouri: leader who survived an Israeli airstrike in Damascus, 12 November 2019, but his son and daughter were killed.
- Tayseer Jabari: military leader who succeeded Baha Abu al-Ata, killed on 5 August 2022 during Operation Breaking Dawn.
- Abu Hamza (spokesperson): Saraya Al Quds spokesman, killed together with his wife on 17 March 2025.

== See also ==
- Black September
- Israeli–Palestinian conflict
- List of Palestinian Islamic Jihad suicide attacks
- March 2012 Gaza–Israel clashes
- Palestinian political violence
