= List of modern conflicts in the Middle East =

List of Middle Eastern conflicts since 1914

Middle East
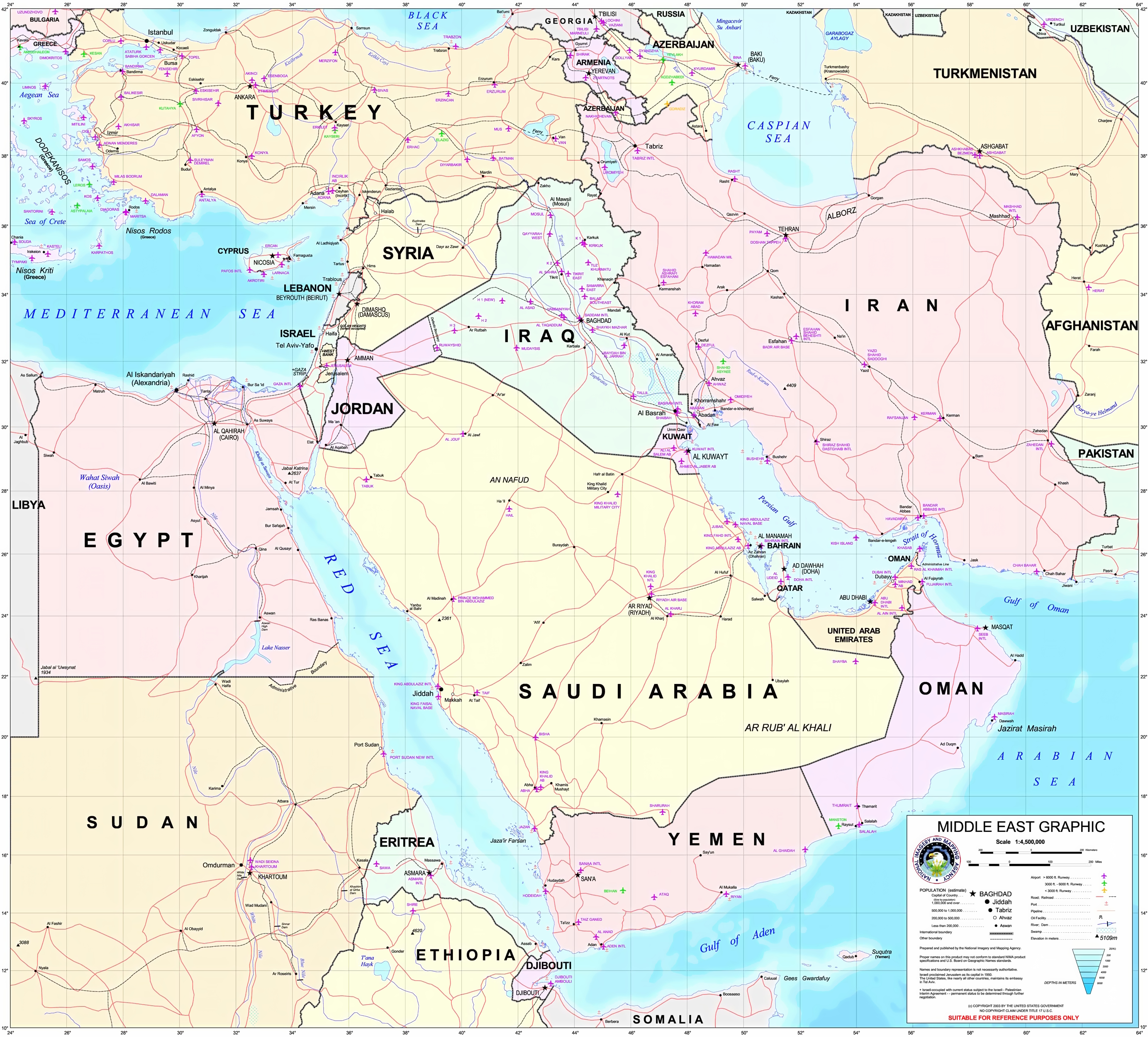
- Countries (2018): Bahrain, Cyprus, Egypt, Iran, Iraq, Israel, Jordan, Kuwait, Lebanon, North Cyprus*, Oman, Palestine*, Qatar, Saudi Arabia, Syria (DFNS), Turkey, United Arab Emirates, Yemen
- *Not a UN member

This is a list of modern conflicts ensuing in the geographic and political region known as the Middle East. The "Middle East" is traditionally defined as the Fertile Crescent (Mesopotamia), Levant, and Egypt and neighboring areas of Arabia, Anatolia and Iran. It currently encompasses the area from Egypt, Turkey and Cyprus in the west to Iran and the Persian Gulf in the east, and from Turkey and Iran in the north, to Yemen and Oman in the south.

- Conflicts are separate incidents with at least 100 casualties, and are listed by total deaths, including sub-conflicts.
- The term "modern" refers to the First World War and later period, in other words, since 1914.

== List of conflicts ==
Date	Conflict	Location	Casualties
1902–1932	Unification of Saudi Arabia^{[a]}	Riyadh; Hejaz; Kuwait; Nejd (Jordan) Transjordan; Mandatory Iraq; Nejd and Hejaz	8,000–9,000
1909–1910	Zaraniq rebellion	Ottoman Empire	830+
1914–1918	Middle Eastern theatre of World War I^{[p]}	Ottoman Empire; Persia; Egypt Nejd and Hasa; Jabal Shammar; Kuwait; Lahej; Armenia; Azerbaijan	Ottoman Empire deaths including civilians: 2,825,000–5,000,000; Allied killed, wounded, captured or missing: 1,000,000–1,500,000; Persians died by famine or disease, excluding influenza: 2,000,000
1918–1922	Simko Shikak revolt	Persia	1,000–5,500
1919	1919 Egyptian revolution	Egypt	3,000
1919–1923	Turkish War of Independence^{[b]}	Ottoman Empire; Greece; Armenia; Soviet Union	882,100–2,075,600+
1919–2003	Iraqi–Kurdish conflict^{[c]}	Mandatory Iraq; Kingdom of Iraq; Iraq; Kingdom of Kurdistan	139,000–320,000 killed
1920	Franco-Syrian War	Arab Kingdom of Syria; OETA	5,000
1920	Iraqi Revolt	Mandatory Iraq	2,050–9,000
1921–1948^{[l]}	Sectarian conflict in Mandatory Palestine	Mandatory Palestine	7,813
1923	Adwan Rebellion	(Jordan) Transjordan	100
1925–1927	Great Syrian Revolt (Druze War)	Greater Lebanon; State of Syria; Jabal Druze; Alawite State	8,000–12,000
1925	Sheikh Said rebellion	Turkey	15,000–250,500
1930	Ararat rebellion	Turkey Republic of Ararat	4,500–47,000
1933	Simele massacre	Kingdom of Iraq	3,000
1934	Saudi–Yemeni war (1934)	Saudi Arabia; Mutawakkilite Kingdom of Yemen	2,100
1935	Goharshad Mosque rebellion	Iran	151
1935–1936	1935–1936 Iraqi Shia revolts	Iraq	500
1935	1935 Yazidi revolt	Iraq	200
1936	1936–1939 Arab revolt in Palestine		
1937	Dersim rebellion	Turkey	40,000–70,000
1939–1945	Mediterranean and Middle East theatre of World War II: Italian invasion of Egypt; Bombing of Bahrain in World War II; Italian bombing of Mandatory Palestine in World War II; Anglo-Iraqi War; Syria–Lebanon campaign; Anglo-Soviet invasion of Iran	Iraq; Iran; French Mandate for Syria and the Lebanon; Mandatory Palestine	≈16,000
1946	Jewish insurgency in Mandatory Palestine		
1946	Egyptian Student Riots	Egypt	100–300
1946	Iran crisis of 1946^{[e]}	Iran; Republic of Mahabad; Azerbaijan People's Government	2,000
1948–	Arab–Israeli conflict^{[f]}	Egypt; All-Palestine Government; Egypt; United Arab Republic; Syrian Republic; Ba'athist Syria; Jordan; Lebanon; Israel; Palestinian Authority	73,000–84,000
1948	Al-Waziri coup	Mutawakkilite Kingdom of Yemen	4,000–5,000
1948	Al-Wathbah uprising	Iraq	300–400
1952	1952 Egyptian revolution	Egypt	1,000
1953	1953 Iranian coup d'état	Iran	300–800
1954–1960	Jebel Akhdar War	Muscat and Oman	100–523
1955–1959	Cyprus Emergency	Cyprus	400–600
1956	Suez Crisis	Egypt	
1956–1960	Yemeni–Adenese clan violence	Aden	1,000
1958	1958 Lebanon Crisis	Lebanon	1,300–4,000
1958	1958 Iraqi Revolution	Arab Federation	100
1959	1959 Mosul uprising	(Iraq) Iraqi Republic	2,000–4,000
1962–1970	North Yemen civil war^{[g]}	North Yemen; Saudi Arabia; Egypt	100,000–200,000
1962–1975	Dhofar War	Oman	10,000
1963	1963 Riots in Iran	Iran	100
1963	Ramadan Revolution	Iraq	1,000
1963	1963 Syrian coup d'état	United Arab Republic; Syria	820
1963–1967	Aden Emergency	Federation of South Arabia; South Yemen	2,096
1963	November 1963 Iraqi coup	Iraq	250
1964	1964 Hama riot	Syria	70–100
1966	1966 neo-Ba'athist coup d'état in Syria	Syria	400
1966	1966 Arif Abd ar-Razzaq second coup	Iraq	80–100
1967	Six-Day War	Israel; Egypt; Syria; Jordan	19,700
1970–1971	Black September	Jordan	2,000–25,000
1972	Yemenite War of 1972	South Yemen North Yemen	100+
1973	Yom Kippur War	Israel; Egypt; Syria	20,500
1974	Turkish invasion of Cyprus	Cyprus	1,500–5,000
1974	Shatt al-Arab clashes	Iran	1,000
1975–1990	Lebanese Civil War^{[h]}	Lebanon	150,000
1976–1980	Political violence in Turkey (1976–1980)	Turkey	5,000–5,388
1978–1982	NDF Rebellion	North Yemen	100+
1978–2025	Kurdistan Workers' Party insurgency	Turkey; Iraqi Kurdistan; Iraq	30,000–100,000
1979	Second Yemenite War	South Yemen North Yemen	1,000+
1978–1979	Iranian Revolution	Iran	3,164–60,000
1979–1980	Consolidation of the Iranian Revolution^{[i]}	Iran	10,171
1979–	Iran–Saudi Arabia proxy conflict	Saudi Arabia; Iran	
1979–1983	Saudi Eastern Province unrest	Saudi Arabia	182–219
1979	Grand Mosque seizure	Saudi Arabia	307
1979–1982	Islamist uprising in Syria	Syria	40,000+
1980	1980 Turkish coup d'état	Turkey	127–550
1980	1980 Sadr uprising	Iraq	1,000–30,000
1980–1988	Iran–Iraq War^{[j]}	Iran; Iraq; Kuwait	1,000,000–1,250,000
1986	South Yemen Civil War	South Yemen	5,000–12,000
1986	1986 Egyptian Conscription Riot	Egypt	107
1986	1986 Damascus bombings	Syria	204
1987	Iranian pilgrim riot (Mecca massacre)	Saudi Arabia	402
1987–1988	ANO Executions	Lebanon; Syria	170
1989–1996	KDPI insurgency (1989–1996)	Iran	168–503
1990–1991	Gulf War	Iraq; Kuwait; Saudi Arabia	40,000–57,000
1991	1991 Iraqi uprisings	Iraq	50,000–100,000
1994	1994 civil war in Yemen	Yemen	7,000–10,000
1995–	Islamic Insurgency in Saudi Arabia	Saudi Arabia	300
1998	Bombing of Iraq (December 1998) (Iraqi no-fly zones)	Iraq	2,000
1999	1999 Shia uprising in Iraq	Iraq	100–200
2003–2011	Iraq War^{[k]}	Ba'athist Iraq; Iraq	460,000–1,033,000; See also: Casualties of the Iraq War
2004	Qamishli massacre (2004)	Syria	30–100
2004–2014	Shia insurgency in Yemen	Saudi Arabia; Yemen	8,500–25,000
2004–	Iran–PJAK conflict	Iran	588–747
2006–	Fatah–Hamas conflict	Palestinian Authority; Gaza Strip	600+
2006	2006 Lebanon War	Lebanon; Israel	≈1600
2006–	Iran–Israel proxy conflict	Iran; Israel	≈2000
2007	Nahr al-Bared fighting	Lebanon	480
2008	2008 Lebanon conflict	Lebanon	105
2009–2015	South Yemen Insurgency	Yemen	2,100+
2010–2015	Yemeni al-Qaeda crackdown	Yemen	3,000+
2011	2011 Bahraini uprising	Bahrain; Saudi Arabia	100+
2011–	Insurgency in Bahrain	Bahrain	22+
2011–2014	Egyptian Crisis (2011–2014)^{[m]}	Egypt	7,000+
2011–	Yemeni crisis (Note: See Outline of the Yemeni Crisis, revolution, and civil war (2011-present) for further articles.)	Yemen	9,000+
2011–2024	Syrian civil war^{[n]}	Syria	503,064–613,407+
2011–2017	Syrian civil war spillover in Lebanon	Lebanon	≈800
2013–2017	War in Iraq (2013–2017)^{[n]}	Iraq	155,500–165,500+
2014–	Yemeni civil war (Note: See Outline of the Yemeni Crisis, revolution, and civil war (2011-present) for further articles.): Saudi-led intervention in Yemen (2015)	Yemen; Saudi Arabia; United Arab Emirates	377,000+
2016–2023	Western Iran clashes	Iran; Iraq; Kurdistan Region	74–156
15–16 July 2016	2016 Turkish coup attempt	Turkey	270–350
2017	2017 Iraqi–Kurdish conflict	Iraq	+305
2017–	Islamic State insurgency in Iraq (2017–present)	Iraq	4,000+
2023–	Gaza war (Note: See Outline of the Gaza war for further articles.)	Israel; West Bank; Gaza Strip	85,000+
2023–	Israel–Hezbollah conflict (2023–present): 2024 Israeli invasion of Lebanon; 2026 Lebanon war	Israel; Lebanon	2600+
2023–	Red Sea crisis	Yemen; Israel	40+
2024	2024 Iran–Israel conflict	Iran; Israel; Jordan; Syria; Iraq; Yemen; Lebanon	20+
2025	Twelve-Day War	Iran; Israel; United States	1,100+
2026	2026 Kurdish–Iranian crisis	Iran; Iraq; Kurdistan Region	N/A
2026	2026 Iran war	Iran; Israel; United States	32,000–36,000+

== Casualties breakdown ==
[a].Unification of Saudi Arabia (combined casualties 7,989–8,989+)

Battle of Riyadh (1902) – 37 killed.
Battle of Dilam (1903) – 410 killed.
First Saudi–Rashidi War (1903–1907) – 2,300+ killed.
Annexation of Al-Hasa and Qatif (1913) – unknown.
Battle of Jarrab (1915) – unknown.
Battle of Kanzaan (1915) – unknown.
First Nejd–Hejaz War, 1918–1919 – 8,392+ killed
Kuwait–Najd War (1921) – 200–800 killed.
1921 Ikhwan raid on Iraq – 700 killed.
Conquest of Ha'il – unknown.
Ikhwan raids on Transjordan 1922–1924 – 500-1,500 killed.
Second Nejd–Hejaz War (1924–1925) – 450 killed.
Ikhwan revolt (1927–1930) – 2,000 killed.

[p].Middle Eastern theatre of World War I (combined casualty figure 2,825,000–5,000,000) of:

- Caucasus campaign
- Persian campaign
- Gallipoli campaign
- Mesopotamian campaign
- Sinai and Palestine campaign
- Arab Revolt
- South Arabia
- Armenian genocide – c 1.5 million dead
- Sayfo – 150,000–300,000 dead
- Great Famine of Mount Lebanon – 200,000 dead

[b].Turkish War of Independence (combined figure 882,100–2,075,600+):

Greco-Turkish War – 70,000–400,000 casualties
Franco-Turkish War – 40,000 casualties.
Turkish–Armenian War – 60,000–432,500 casualties.
Revolts during the Turkish War of Independence - more than 27,082+ casualties (Note: Those casualties are only included Pontic uprising, Koçgiri rebellion and Revolt of Ahmet Anzavur.)
Turkish-Georgian War (Red Army invasion of Georgia)- 20,000 casualties.

665,000-1,156,000 Greek, Armenian, Turkish etc. civilian massacred during the war.

[c].Iraqi–Kurdish conflict (combined casualty figure 138,800–320,100) of:

Mahmud Barzanji revolts – unknown.
Ahmad Barzanji revolt (1931) – unknown.
1943 Iraqi Kurdish revolt (1943) – unknown.
First Iraqi–Kurdish War (1961–1970) – 75,000–105,000 killed.
Second Iraqi–Kurdish War (1974–1975) – 9,000 killed.
600,000 displaced
PUK insurgency (1976–1978) – 800 killed.
1983–1986 Kurdish rebellions in Iraq – 50,000–198,000 killed.
Battle of Sulaymaniyah (1991) – 700–2,000 killed.
Iraqi Kurdish Civil War (1994–1997) – 3,000–5,000 killed.
2003 U.S. invasion of Iraq – several hundred killed (≈300) on the Kurdish front, at least 24 Peshmerga soldiers killed.

[d].Middle Eastern theatre of World War II (combined casualty figure 12,338–14,898+) of:

Anglo-Iraqi War – at least 560 killed.
Farhud 175–780 killed.
Syria–Lebanon campaign 10,404–12,964 killed.
Anglo-Soviet invasion of Iran 100 – 1,062 killed.
Bombing of Palestine in World War II 137 deaths.
Bombing of Bahrain in World War II – unknown.

[e].Iran crisis of 1946 (combined casualty figure 1,921+):

Azerbaijan People's Republic crisis – 421 killed.
Republic of Mahabad crisis – ≈1,000 killed.
Civil interregnum – 500 killed.

[f].Arab–Israeli conflict (combined casualty figure 76,338–87,338+):

Arab–Israeli War (1948–1949) – 14,400 casualties.
Palestinian Fedayeen insurgency and Reprisal operations (1950s) – 3,456 casualties
Suez Crisis (1956) – 3,203 killed.
Israeli–Palestinian conflict (1965–present) – 24,000 killed

Palestinian insurgency in South Lebanon – 2,600–20,000 killed

1978 South Lebanon conflict
1982 Lebanon War

First Intifada – 2,000 killed
Second Intifada – 7,000 killed
Gaza–Israel conflict – 3,500+ killed

Six-Day War (1967) – 13,976 killed.
War of Attrition (1967–1970) – 6,403 killed.
Yom Kippur War (1973) 10,000–21,000.

[g].North Yemen civil war (combined 100,000–200,000 casualties):

1962 Coup d'état
Ramadan offensive
Haradh offensive
1965 Royalist offensive
Siege of Sanaa (1967)

[h].Lebanese Civil War (combined 39,132–43,970+ mortal casualties):

1975 Beirut bus massacre – 27 killed.
Hundred Days' War – 160 killed.
Karantina massacre – 1,000–1,500 killed.
Damour massacre – 684 killed.
Battle of the Hotels – 700 killed.
Black Saturday (Lebanon) – 200–600 killed.
Tel al-Zaatar massacre – 1,778–3,278 killed.
1982 Lebanon War – 28,280 killed.
Sabra and Shatila massacre – 762–3,500 killed.
War of the Camps (1986–1987) – 3,781 killed.
Mountain War – 1,600 killed.
War of Liberation (1989–1990) – unknown.
October 13 massacre – 500–700 killed, 260 civilians massacred.

[i].Consolidation of the Iranian Revolution (combined fatalities count 12,000):

1979 Kurdish rebellion in Iran – 10,171+ killed and executed.
1979 Khuzestan insurgency – 112+ killed.
1979 Khorasan uprising – unknown.
1979 Azeri uprising – unknown.
1979 Baluchistan uprising – 50 killed.
Iran hostage crisis – 9 killed.
1979–1980 Tehran clashes – unknown.

[j].Iran–Iraq War (combined death count 645,000–823,000+):

Iraqi invasion 1980
Mujahedin al-Halq uprising 1981–1982
Battle of Khorramshahr (1982) – 17,000 killed
Operation Fath ol-Mobin 1982 – 50,000 mortal casualties
Operation Ramadan 1982 – 80,000 killed
1983–1986 Kurdish rebellion in Iraq (including the Anfal campaign) 50,000–198,000 killed
Operation Before the Dawn 1983 – 6,000+ killed
Operation Dawn 3 – 162,000 killed
Operation Dawn 5 1984 – 50,000 killed
Operation Dawn 6 1984 – unknown
Operation Kheibar 1984 – 49,000 killed
Tanker War 1984
Operation Badr (1985) – 30,000–32,000
War of the Cities 1985–1987
First Battle of al-Faw 1986 – unknown
Operation Karbala-4 1986 – 15,000 killed
Siege of Basra – 85,000 killed
Operation Nasr 4 – unknown
Operation Karbala 10 – unknown
Operation Mersad 1987 – 4,900 killed
1988 executions of Iranian political prisoners 2,000 – 30,000 executed

[k].Iraq War 2003–2011 (combined casualty figure of 192,361–226,056+):

2003 U.S. invasion of Iraq – 35,000 killed
Iraqi insurgency (2003–06) – 15,000 killed
Civil war in Iraq 2006–2008 – 30,000–40,000 killed
Iraqi insurgency (2008–2011) – 5,000–10,000 killed

Withdrawal of U.S. troops from Iraq – ≈1,000 killed

Iraqi insurgency (post-U.S. withdrawal) – 54,000+ killed
War in Iraq (2013–2017) – 53,361–72,056 killed

[l].Sectarian conflict in Mandatory Palestine (combined casualties 7,813)

1921 Jaffa riots – 95 killed
1929 Palestine riots – 251 killed.
1933 Palestine riots – 20 killed.
Arab Revolt in Palestine – 5,000 killed.
Jewish insurgency in Mandatory Palestine (1944–47) – 338 British and around 100 Palestinian Jews killed.
1947–48 Civil War in Mandatory Palestine – 2,009 killed by 1 April 1948.

[m].Egyptian Crisis (combined casualties 5,000+)

2011 Egyptian revolution – 846 killed
Sinai insurgency – 2,800+ killed

[n].Syrian civil war (combined casualties 503,064–613,407)

- Civil uprising phase of the Syrian civil war –
- Early insurgency phase of the Syrian civil war –
- 2012–2013 escalation of the Syrian civil war –
- Inter-rebel conflict during the Syrian civil war – 5,641–6,991 killed
- ISIL expansion
- Foreign involvement in the Syrian civil war
  - US intervention in the Syrian civil war
  - Russian intervention in the Syrian civil war
- Battle of Aleppo and Operation Euphrates Shield
- Eastern Syria campaign
- Idlib demilitarization (2018–2019)
- Northwestern Syria offensive (April–August 2019) and 2019 Turkish offensive into north-eastern Syria

[o].Iran–Israel proxy conflict (combined casualties ≈2,000)

- 2006 Lebanon War – 1,641 killed
- Iran–Israel conflict during the Syrian civil war – several dozen killed

== See also ==
- Arab Spring
- List of extrajudicial killings and political violence in Lebanon
- British foreign policy in the Middle East
- List of Middle East peace proposals
- 1913 in the United States
- Lists of wars in World (by date, region, type of conflict)
  - Lists of wars and conflict by region
    - Lists of battles (Orders)
  - List of active rebel groups
    - List of rebel groups that control territory
  - List of number of conflicts per year
    - List of battles by casualties
- Africa :
  - List of conflicts in Africa (Military history of Africa)
    - List of modern conflicts in North Africa (Maghreb)
    - Conflicts in the Horn of Africa (East region)
- Americas :
  - List of conflicts in North America
    - Lists of wars involving the United States
  - List of conflicts in Central America
  - List of conflicts in South America
- Asia :
  - List of conflicts in Asia
  - List of conflicts in the Near East (pre-modern)
  - List of conflicts in the southern Levant
- Europe :
  - List of conflicts in Europe
    - Post-Cold War European conflicts
- Ongoing conflicts in World :
  - List of ongoing armed conflicts
  - List of wars: 2003–2019
    - Ongoing military conflicts
