= List of conflicts in the southern Levant =

List of conflicts

This is a list of conflicts in the southern Levant arranged chronologically from ancient to modern times. This region has also been referred to historically as the Land of Canaan, the Land of Israel, the Holy Land, the Promised Land, and Palestine. This region has been ruled over by many nations, including the Canaanites, Israelites, Judeans, Romans, Rashidun Caliphates, Crusaders, Ottoman Empire, British Empire, and today, Israel and Palestine. In addition to wars and battles, there may also be periods of violent, civil unrest included in this list, such as: massacres, riots, rebellions, and revolutions.

== 1050 BCE–551 BCE ==
Started	Ended	Name of conflict	Belligerents	
Started	Ended	Name of conflict	Victorious party (if applicable)	Defeated party (if applicable)
c. 1025 BCE	c. 1025 BCE	Battle of Michmas	United Kingdom of Israel	Jebusites
c. 1010 BCE	c. 1010 BCE	Siege of Jebus	Kingdom of Israel	Jebus
Early 9th century BC	Early 9th century BC	Battle of Zephath	Kingdom of Judah	Twenty-second Dynasty of Egypt with Kushite contingents
c. 874 BCE	c. 874 BCE	Israelite–Aramean War Part of war in the Hebrew Bible	Kingdom of Israel (Samaria)	Kingdom of Aram-Damascus
736 BCE	732 BCE	Syro-Ephraimite War	Neo-Assyrian Empire; Kingdom of Judah	Kingdom of Aram-Damascus; Kingdom of Israel
701 BCE	701 BCE	Sennacherib's campaign in Judah	Kingdom of Judah: Phoenicia; Philistia; Supported by Kushite Egypt	Neo-Assyrian Empire
701 BCE	701 BCE	Siege of Azekah	Neo-Assyrian Empire	Kingdom of Judah
701 BCE	701 BCE	Siege of Lachish	Neo-Assyrian Empire	Kingdom of Judah
701 BC	701 BC	Assyrian siege of Jerusalem	Kingdom of Judah	Neo-Assyrian Empire
c. 655 BC	c. 655 BC	Fall of Ashdod Part of the Wars of Neo-Assyria	Twenty-sixth dynasty of Egypt	Neo-Assyrian Empire
609 BC	609 BC	Battle of Megiddo (609 BC) Part of the Medo-Babylonian conquest of the Assyrian Empire	Twenty-sixth Dynasty of Egypt	Kingdom of Judah
601 BCE	586 BCE	Judah's revolts against Babylon	Neo-Babylonian Empire; Supported by: Kingdom of Moab; Kingdom of Ammon; Chaldea	Kingdom of Judah; Supported by: Twenty-sixth Egyptian dynasty
c. 597 BC	c. 597 BC	Siege of Jerusalem (597 BCE) Part of Judah's revolts against Babylon (601–586 BC)	Neo-Babylonian Empire	Kingdom of Judah
589 BC	587 BC	Siege of Jerusalem (587 BC) Part of the Jewish–Babylonian War	Neo-Babylonian Empire	Kingdom of Judah

== 550 BCE–1 BCE ==
Started	Ended	Name of conflict	Belligerents	
Started	Ended	Name of conflict	Victorious party (if applicable)	Defeated party (if applicable)
336 BC	323 BC	Wars of Alexander the Great	Macedonian Empire • Hellenic League	Achaemenid Empire Balkans: Illyrians; Thracians; Polis; Western and Central Asia: Bactria; Sogdia; Uxiians; India: Pauravas; Aśvaka; Guraens; Mallians; Oxydracians; Amvastha
332 BC	332 BC	Siege of Gaza; Part of the Wars of Alexander the Great	Macedon; Hellenic League	Achaemenid Empire; Arab mercenaries
322 BC	281 BC	Wars of the Diadochi	First War (321–319 BC): Antipatrid dynasty; Antigonid dynasty; Ptolemaic dynasty; Second War (318–316 BC): Antigonid dynasty; Antipatrid dynasty; Ptolemaic dynasty; Lysimachid Thrace; Third War (315-311BC): Antigonid dynasty; Polyperchon; Babylonian War (311–309 BC): Antigonid dynasty; Fourth War (307–301 BC): Antigonid dynasty	First War (321–319 BC): Perdiccas's faction; Second War (318–316 BC): Polyperchon's faction; Epirus; Third War (315-311 BC): Ptolemaic Egypt Nabateans; Antipatrid Macedon; Lysimachid Thrace; Caria; Babylonian War (311–309 BC): Seleucid Empire; Fourth War (307–301 BC): Ptolemaic Egypt; Antipatrid Macedon; Lysimachid Thrace; Seleucid Persia
312 BC	312 BC	Battle of Gaza (312 BCE); Part of the Wars of the Diadochi	Ptolemaics; Seleucids	Antigonids
167 BCE	141 BCE	Maccabean Revolt	Maccabees	Seleucid Empire
167 or 166 BCE	167 or 166 BCE	Battle of the Ascent of Lebonah Part of the Maccabean Revolt	Judean rebels	Seleucid army
166 BC or 165 BC	166 BC or 165 BC	Battle of Beth Horon (166 BCE) Part of the Maccabean Revolt	Judean rebels	Seleucid army
165 BC	165 BC	Battle of Emmaus Part of the Maccabean Revolt	Maccabees	Seleucid Empire
164 BC	164 BC	Battle of Beth Zur Part of the Maccabean Revolt	Maccabees	Seleucid Empire
163 BCE	163 BCE	Maccabee campaigns of 163 BC Part of the Maccabean Revolt	Maccabean rebels	Seleucid Empire
163 BCE	163 BCE	Battle of Dathema Part of the Maccabean Revolt	Maccabees	Seleucid Empire
162 BC	162 BC	Battle of Beth Zechariah Part of the Maccabean Revolt	Maccabean army	Seleucid Empire
161 BC	161 BC	Battle of Adasa Part of the Maccabean Revolt	Jewish rebels	Seleucid Empire
160 BCE	160 BCE	Battle of Elasa Part of the Maccabean Revolt	Seleucid Empire	Maccabean rebels
107 BCE	88 BCE	Civil War of Ptolemy Lathyros	Egypt (Ptolemy IX Soter) Cyprus Phoenicia	Egypt (Cleopatra III) Judea (103–93) Nabatea (103–93)
93 BC	93 BC	Battle of Gadara	Nabataean Kingdom	Hasmonean dynasty
93 BCE	87 BCE	Judean Civil War Part of the Pharisee-Sadducee conflict	Sadducees	Pharisees: Seleucid Empire (89-88 BCE)
67 BCE	63 BCE	Hasmonean Civil War Part of the Pharisee-Sadducee conflict Part of the Third Mithridatic War	Hyrcanus supporters: Pharisees; Nabataean kingdom	Aristobulus supporters: Sadducees; Mercenaries Roman Republic
63 BC	63 BC	Siege of Jerusalem (63 BCE) Part of the Hasmonean civil war	Roman Republic	Hasmonean Kingdom
37 or 36 BC (Note: Josephus simultaneously dates the siege and capture to when Agrippa and Gallus were consuls at Rome (37 BC), and to 27 years after Pompey's capture of the city in 63 (36 BC). Emil Schürer (1891) tried to reconcile the two conflicting statements by proposing that Josephus counted the years inclusively, placing the siege in 37, and a majority of scholars have concurred with this view. Filmer, Steinmann and others argued that Josephus's reckoning of dates by Roman consuls is unreliable and conflicts with external evidence, and that 36 should be preferred.)	37 or 36 BC	Siege of Jerusalem (37 BCE) Part of the Antony's Parthian War	Herodian dynasty Roman Republic	Hasmonean dynasty

== 1–999 ==
Started	Ended	Name of conflict	Belligerents	
Started	Ended	Name of conflict	Victorious party (if applicable)	Defeated party (if applicable)
66 CE	66 CE	Jerusalem riots of 66	Roman governor Gessius Florus	Jewish residents of Jerusalem
66 AD	74 AD	First Jewish–Roman War; Part of the Jewish–Roman wars	Roman Empire	Judean provisional government Supported by: Adiabene volunteers; Peasantry faction; Idumeans (69–70); Radical factions: Zealots; Idumeans (68); Sicarii
70 CE	70 CE	Siege of Jerusalem (70 CE); Part of the First Jewish–Roman War	Roman Empire	Jewish rebels
116 CE	118 CE	Kitos War; Part of the Second Jewish–Roman War	Roman Empire	Jews
132 AD	136 AD	Bar Kokhba revolt Part of the Jewish–Roman wars	Roman Empire	Jews of Judaea
351AD	352 AD	Jewish revolt against Constantius Gallus; Part of the Roman civil war of 350–353	Roman Empire	Jews of Israel
484	573	Samaritan revolts	Byzantine Empire: Dux Palaestinae troops; Arcadiani; Ghassanids	Samaritan rebels; Jewish rebels (556 and 572 revolts)
c. 602	c. 628	Byzantine–Sasanian War of 602–628; Part of the Roman–Persian wars	Byzantine Empire: Western Turkic Khaganate	Sasanian Empire: Avars; Sasanian Iberia; Jewish and Samaritan rebels
614	614	Siege of Caesarea Maritima (614); Part of the Byzantine–Sasanian War of 602–628	Byzantine Empire	Sasanian Empire
614 CE	617/625 CE	Jewish revolt against Heraclius; Part of the Byzantine–Sasanian War of 602–628	Byzantine Empire	Sasanian Empire; Jewish allies
614 CE	614 CE	Sasanian conquest of Jerusalem; Part of the Jewish revolt against Heraclius Part of the Byzantine–Sasanian War of 602–628	Byzantine Empire	Sasanian Empire; Anti-Heraclian Jews
634 CE	638 CE	Muslim conquest of the Levant; Part of the Arab–Byzantine wars	Rashidun Caliphate	Byzantine Empire; Ghassanids; Tanukhids; Banu Judham; Banu Lakhm

== 1000–1499 ==
Started	Ended	Name of conflict	Belligerents	
Started	Ended	Name of conflict	Victorious party (if applicable)	Defeated party (if applicable)
1096	1099	First Crusade; Part of the Crusades	Crusader armies Army of Raymond of Saint-Gilles; Army of Godfrey of Bouillon; Army of Robert Curthose; Army of Robert II of Flanders; Army of Hugh the Great; Armies of Bohemond of Taranto; Armies of the People's Crusade; Byzantine Empire	Muslim States; Seljuk Empire; Emirate of Rum; Danishmendids; Fatimid Caliphate
1099	1099	Siege of Jerusalem (1099); Part of the First Crusade	Crusaders	Fatimid Caliphate
1101	1101	Battle of Ramla (1101); Part of the Crusades	Kingdom of Jerusalem	Fatimid Caliphate
1102	1102	Battle of Ramla (1102); Part of the Crusades	Fatimid Caliphate	Kingdom of Jerusalem
1104	1104	Siege of Acre (1104); Part of the Crusades	Kingdom of Jerusalem; Republic of Genoa	Fatimid Caliphate
1122	1124	Venetian Crusade; Part of the Crusades	Republic of Venice; Kingdom of Jerusalem; County of Tripoli	Fatimid Caliphate; Seljuk Empire; Burid dynasty
1147	1150	Second Crusade; Part of the Crusades and the Reconquista	Seljuk Empire; Fatimid Caliphate; Almoravids	Kingdom of France; Holy Roman Empire; Byzantine Empire; Kingdom of England; Kingdom of Sicily; Kingdom of Portugal; County of Barcelona; León–Castile; Kingdom of Jerusalem; County of Tripoli; Principality of Antioch; Knights Templar
1177	1177	Battle of Montgisard; Part of the Crusades	Kingdom of Jerusalem; Knights Templar	Ayyubid dynasty
1179	1179	Battle of Marj Ayyun; Part of the Crusades	Ayyubid Dynasty	Kingdom of Jerusalem; Knights Templar
1179	1179	Battle of Jacob's Ford; Part of the Crusades	Ayyubid Dynasty	Kingdom of Jerusalem
1182	1182	Battle of Belvoir Castle; Part of the Crusades	Kingdom of Jerusalem	Ayyubid Dynasty
1183	1183	Battle of Al-Fule; Part of the Crusades	Kingdom of Jerusalem	Ayyubids
1187	1187	Battle of Cresson; Part of the Crusades	Ayyubids	Knights Templar; Knights Hospitaller; Kingdom of Jerusalem
1187	1187	Battle of Hattin; Part of the Wars of the Crusader States	Ayyubid Sultanate	Kingdom of Jerusalem; County of Tripoli; Knights Templar; Principality of Antioch; Knights Hospitaller; Order of St. Lazarus; Order of Mountjoy
1187	1187	1187 Siege of Jerusalem	Ayyubid Sultanate	Kingdom of Jerusalem; Knights Hospitaller; Knights Templar; Order of St. Lazarus; Order of Mountjoy; County of Tripoli
1192	1192	Third Crusade; Part of the Crusades	Angevin Empire; Kingdom of France; Holy Roman Empire; Kingdom of Hungary; Republic of Genoa; Kingdom of Navarre; Republic of Pisa; Kingdom of Jerusalem; Principality of Antioch; Knights Templar; Knights Hospitaller; Teutonic Order	Ayyubid Sultanate; Sultanate of Rum; Nizari Ismaili state (the Assassins); Byzantine Empire; Cyprus
1197	1198	Crusade of 1197; Part of the Crusades	Holy Roman Empire; Kingdom of Cyprus; Duchy of Brabant; Duchy of Austria; Landgraviate of Thuringia; County Palatine of the Rhine; Duchy of Merania; Bishopric of Passau; Bishopric of Hildesheim; Bishopric of Halberstadt; County of Gorizia	Ayyubids
1202	1204	Fourth Crusade; Part of the Crusades	Crusaders from: Kingdom of France; Holy Roman Empire; Republic of Venice	In Europe: Byzantine Empire; Kingdom of Hungary; Holy Land: Ayyubid dynasty
1227	1229	Sixth Crusade; Part of the Crusades	Holy Roman Empire; Teutonic Knights; Kingdom of Sicily	Ayyubids of Egypt; Ayyubids of Damascus
1228	1243	War of the Lombards	Kingdom of Cyprus; Anti-Imperial faction in the Kingdom of Jerusalem: Acre; Beirut; Arsuf; Caesarea Republic of Genoa Knights Templar Papacy	Holy Roman Empire; Pro-Imperial faction in the Kingdom of Jerusalem: Tyre; Jerusalem Principality of Antioch and County of Tripoli Republic of Pisa Knights Hospitaller Teutonic Knights
1244	1244	Siege of Jerusalem (1244)	As-Salih Ayyub	Kingdom of Jerusalem
1248	1254	Seventh Crusade; Part of the Crusades	Ayyubid Dynasty: Mamluk Sultanate; Bahri dynasty; Khwarazmians	Kingdom of France; Kingdom of Jerusalem; Knights Templar; Knights Hospitaller; Kingdom of Navarre
1256	1270	War of Saint Sabas	Republic of Venice; Supported: County of Jaffa and Ascalon; Knights Templar	Republic of Genoa; Support: Philip of Monfort; John of Arsuf; Knights Hospitaller; Byzantine Empire
1271	May 1272	Ninth Crusade; Part of the Crusades	Mamluk Sultanate; Bahris	Kingdom of England; Kingdom of Cyprus; Kingdom of Jerusalem; Antioch-Tripoli; Military orders: Knights Templar; Knights Hospitaller; Teutonic Order; Ilkhanate
1291	1291	Siege of Acre (1291)	Mamluk Sultanate: Ayyubid remnant emirate of Hama	Kingdom of Jerusalem (in union with Cyprus); Knights Templar; Knights Hospitaller; Teutonic Order; Order of St. Thomas; Order of St. Lazarus

== 1500–1899 ==
Started	Ended	Name of conflict	Belligerents		
Started	Ended	Name of conflict	Victorious party (if applicable)	Defeated party (if applicable)	
1516	1517	Second Ottoman–Mamluk War; Part of the Ottoman wars in the Near East	Ottoman Empire; Mamluk defectors	Mamluk Sultanate	
1658	1667	Druze power struggle (1658–1667)	Ottoman Empire: Ottoman Syria; Pro-Ottoman Druze clans	Ma'n dynasty	
1730s	1775		Zahir al-Umar revolt	Ottoman Empire	Emirate of Palestine
1798	1801	French campaign in Egypt and Syria Part of the War of the Second Coalition	Ottoman Empire: Egypt; Mamluks; Regency of Algiers; Great Britain (1798–1800); United Kingdom (1801); Irregular and auxiliary forces: Nablus tribesmen; Bedouin tribesmen (1798–1799, 1801); Albanian bashi-bazouks	French Republic	
1799	1799	1799 Siege of Jaffa; Part of the French invasion of Egypt and Syria during the War of the Second Coalition	(French First Republic) French Republic	Ottoman Empire	
1799	1799	1799 Siege of Acre; Part of the French Campaign in Egypt and Syria during the War of the Second Coalition	Ottoman Empire (Kingdom of Great Britain) Great Britain	(French First Republic) French Republic	
1799	1799	1799 Battle of Mount Tabor; Part of the French Campaign in Egypt and Syria during the War of the Second Coalition	(French First Republic) French Republic	Ottoman Empire: Mamluks; Nablus Tribesman	
1831	1833	First Egyptian–Ottoman War; Part of the campaigns of Muhammad Ali of Egypt	Egypt; Supported by: Shihab dynasty Soran Emirate	Ottoman Empire Russian Empire (1833)	
1834	1835	Syrian Peasant Revolt; Part of the campaigns of Muhammad Ali of Egypt	Egypt	Alawite clans Urban notables of: Nablus; Jerusalem; Hebron; Safed	
1838	1838	1838 Druze revolt Part of the Campaigns of Muhammad Ali of Egypt	Egypt Eyalet; Shihab's forces supported by: Anaza tribe; Wuld Ali tribe; Sulut tribe of Laja (since March 1838)	Druze clans supported by: Sulut tribe of Laja (until March 1838); Maydan quarter of Damascus	
1839	1841	Second Egyptian–Ottoman War; Part of the campaigns of Muhammad Ali of Egypt	(Ottoman Empire) Ottoman Empire; Allies: (United Kingdom of Great Britain and Ireland) United Kingdom (Austrian Empire) Austria (Russian Empire) Russia (Kingdom of Prussia) Prussia	(Ottoman Egypt) Egypt; Allies: France; Spain	
1860	1860	1860 Syrian Civil War	Rural Druze clans: Abu Nakad clan; Imad clan; Talhuq clan; Jumblatt clan; Supported by: al-Atrash clan; Harfush clan; Rural Sunni and Shia Muslim militiamen; Sardiyah tribe; Ottoman government	Maronites and allies: Rural Maronite militiamen; Zahalni militiamen; Shihab dynasty; Supported by: French expeditionary forces	

== 1900–1999 ==
Started	Ended	Name of conflict	Belligerents	
Started	Ended	Name of conflict	Victorious party (if applicable)	Defeated party (if applicable)
1915	1918	Sinai and Palestine campaign Part of the Middle Eastern theatre of World War I	United Kingdom and Empire; India; Australia; New Zealand; Newfoundland; South Africa; Rhodesia; Egypt; Sudan; Cyprus; Jewish Legion; Hejaz; France; Italy	Ottoman Empire; Germany; Austria-Hungary
1916	1918	Arab Revolt Part of the Middle Eastern theatre of World War I	Hejaz; Supported by: United Kingdom; France	Ottoman Empire; Supported by: Jabal Shammar; Germany
1918	1918	Battle of Megiddo (1918) Part of the Middle Eastern theatre of World War I	British Empire: United Kingdom; India; Australia; New Zealand; South Africa; Hejaz; France	Ottoman Empire; German Empire
1920	1948	Intercommunal conflict in Mandatory Palestine: Battle of Tel Hai; 1920 Jerusalem riots; 1921 Jaffa riots; 1929 Palestine riots; 1933 Palestine riots; 1948 Kfar Etzion massacre; Part of the Israeli–Palestinian conflict and precursor to the 1948 Palestine War	(Israel) Jewish National Council (Yishuv); Haganah; POSH; Peulot Meyuhadot; Irgun (1931–48); Lehi (1940–48)	Arab Higher Committee (Palestinian Arabs): Fasa'il (1936–39); Army of the Holy War (1947–48); Arab Liberation Army (1947–48); Central Committee of National Jihad in Palestine (1937–39); Jihadist groups: Black Hand (1929–1935); United Kingdom: British Army; Palestine Police Force; Jewish Settlement Police; Jewish Supernumerary Police; Special Night Squads
1936	1939	1936–1939 Arab revolt in Palestine Part of the intercommunal conflict in Mandatory Palestine, the decolonisation of Asia, and the precursor to the Israeli–Palestinian conflict	United Kingdom: British Army; Palestine Police Force; Jewish Settlement Police; Jewish Supernumerary Police; Special Night Squads; NDF (from 1937): Arab "peace bands"; Jewish National Council: Haganah; Fosh; Peulot Meyuhadot; Irgun	Arab Higher Committee (1936–October 1937): Local rebel factions (fasa'il); Volunteers from Arab world; Central Committee of National Jihad in Palestine (October 1937–1939): Bureau of the Arab Revolt in Palestine (late 1938–1939); Society for the Defense of Palestine
1940	1941	Italian bombing of Mandatory Palestine in World War II Part of the Mediterranean and Middle East theatre of World War II	Italy	United Kingdom: Palestine; Yishuv
1944	1948	Jewish insurgency in Mandatory Palestine Part of the intercommunal conflict in Mandatory Palestine and the decolonisation of Asia	Jewish National Council: Irgun (1944–1948); Lehi (1944–1948); Haganah (1945–1946); Palmach; Hish; Him	United Kingdom: British Army; Royal Navy; Royal Air Force; Royal Marines; Palestine Police Force
1947	1948	1947–1948 civil war in Mandatory Palestine Part of the intercommunal conflict in Mandatory Palestine, the 1948 Palestine War and the decolonisation of Asia	(Israel) Jewish National Council; Haganah; Palmach; Irgun; Lehi; Foreign volunteers; Allied Bedouin tribes	Arab Higher Committee; (All-Palestine Protectorate) Army of the Holy War; Arab Liberation Army; Jordan; Arab Legion; United Kingdom; Mandatory Palestine
1948	1949	1948 Arab–Israeli War Part of the 1948 Palestine war and the Arab–Israeli conflict	Israel Before 26 May 1948: (Israel) Yishuv; Paramilitary groups: Haganah; Palmach; Hish; Him; Irgun; Lehi; Allied Bedouin tribes After 26 May 1948: Israel Defense Forces; Minorities Unit; Foreign volunteers: Mahal	Arab League: Egypt; All-Palestine Protectorate (Note: After 22 September 1948); Holy War Army; Transjordan; Iraq; Syria; Lebanon (Note: Lebanon had decided to not participate in the war and only took part in the battle of al-Malikiya on 5–6 June 1948.); Saudi Arabia; Yemen Irregulars: Arab Liberation Army; Al-Najjada; Holy War Army
1949	1956	Palestinian Fedayeen insurgency Part of the Israeli–Palestinian conflict and Arab–Israeli conflict	Israel	Palestinian Fedayeen Supported by: All-Palestine Protectorate; Kingdom of Egypt (until 1953); Republic of Egypt (from 1953); Syria; Jordan
1950s	1960s	Reprisal operations (Israel) Part of the Palestinian Fedayeen insurgency (during the Arab–Israeli conflict)	Israel	All-Palestine: Palestinian fedayeen; Supported by: Kingdom of Egypt (1950–1953); Egypt (1953–1958); Egypt (UAR) (1958–1970); Jordan; Syria
1967	1967	Six-Day War Part of the Arab–Israeli conflict and the Cold War	Israel	Egypt; Syria; Jordan; Iraq; Minor involvement: Lebanon
1967	1970	War of Attrition Part of the Arab–Israeli conflict and the Cold War	Israel	Egypt; Soviet Union; Kuwait; PLO; Jordan; Syria; Cuba
1973	1973	Yom Kippur War Part of the Arab–Israeli conflict and the Cold War	Israel	Egypt; Syria; Expeditionary forces Saudi Arabia Algeria Jordan Libya Iraq Kuwait Tunisia Morocco Cuba North Korea
1978	1978	1978 South Lebanon conflict Part of the Palestinian insurgency in South Lebanon, the Lebanese Civil War, and the Israeli–Lebanese conflict	Israel; SLA	PLO
1982	1985	1982 Lebanon War Part of the Israeli–Palestinian conflict	Israel; Lebanese Forces; South Lebanon Army	PLO; Syria; Others: Lebanese National Resistance Front; Al-Mourabitoun; PKK
1985	Ongoing	Iran–Israel proxy conflict Part of the post–Cold War era, the Arab–Israeli conflict, the Iran–Saudi Arabia proxy conflict, and the Iran–Turkey proxy conflict	Iran Proxies: Hezbollah; Hamas (2006–2011; 2017–present); Popular Front for the Liberation of Palestine (PFLP) (2013–present); Palestinian Islamic Jihad (PIJ); Popular Front for the Liberation of Palestine – General Command (PFLP–GC) (2013–present); Sabireen Movement; Houthis; Popular Mobilization Forces; National Defence Forces (until 2024); Islamic Resistance in Iraq; Liwa Fatemiyoun; Husseiniyoun; Liwa Zainebiyoun; Al-Ashtar Brigades; Support: Syria (until 2024)	Israel Proxies: South Lebanon Army (until 2000); National Council of Resistance of Iran; (Democratic Autonomous Administration of North and East Syria) Autonomous Administration of North and East Syria; Fursan al-Joulan (2013–19); Popular Forces of Palestine (2024–); Kurdistan Freedom Party (2025–); Support: United States; United Kingdom; France; Jordan; Palestinian Authority
1982	2000	South Lebanon conflict (1985–2000) Part of the Israeli–Lebanese conflict, the Iran–Israel proxy conflict, and the Israeli–Palestinian conflict	Hezbollah; Amal; Lebanese Communist Party; Jammoul; PFLP–GC	Israel; South Lebanon Army
1987	1993	First Intifada Part of the Israeli–Palestinian conflict	Israel	Al-Qiyada al-Muwhhada; Fatah; Popular Front for the Liberation of Palestine; Democratic Front for the Liberation of Palestine; Palestinian Communist Party; Hamas; Palestinian Islamic Jihad

== 2000–2024 ==
Started	Ended	Name of conflict	Belligerents	
Started	Ended	Name of conflict	Victorious party (if applicable)	Defeated party (if applicable)
2000	2005	Second Intifada; Part of the Israeli–Palestinian conflict	Israel	Palestinian Authority; PLO; Fatah; Popular Front for the Liberation of Palestine; Democratic Front for the Liberation of Palestine; Hamas; Palestinian Islamic Jihad; Popular Resistance Committees
2000	2006	2000–2006 Shebaa Farms conflict Part of the Israeli–Lebanese conflict and the Iran–Israel proxy conflict	Israel	Hezbollah
2006	Ongoing	Fatah–Hamas conflict	Hamas; (Palestine) Gaza Strip (after June 2007); Supported by: Iran	Fatah; (Palestine) Palestinian Authority; Al-Aqsa Martyrs' Brigades (until 2007) (Note: The Al-Aqsa Martyrs' Brigades was Fatah's armed wing, and while still aligned with Fatah in terms of political ideology, is now a member of the Palestinian Joint Operations Room and allied with Hamas. The AAMB separated from Fatah after Mahmoud Abbas' 2007 decree banning all militias following the Battle of Gaza. Nonetheless, it sometimes still presents itself as the party's armed wing, an association rejected by Fatah leadership.); Supported by: United States (alleged); United Kingdom (covert)
2006	2006	2006 Lebanon War; Part of the Israeli–Lebanese conflict, the Iran–Israel proxy conflict and the war on terror	Israel	Hezbollah Allies: Amal; Popular Guard; PFLP-GC
2007	2007	Hamas' takeover of Gaza; Part of the Fatah–Hamas conflict	Hamas	Fatah; Palestinian Authority; Supported by: United States (alleged by Hamas)
2008	2009	Gaza War; Part of the Gaza–Israel conflict	Israel; Israel Defense Forces; Israel Security Agency	Gaza Strip; Hamas; (Hamas) Ezzedeen al-Qassam Brigades; Popular Front for the Liberation of Palestine; (Popular Front for the Liberation of Palestine) Abu Ali Mustapha Brigades; Islamic Jihad Movement in Palestine; (Palestinian Islamic Jihad) Al-Quds Brigades; Al-Aqsa Martyrs' Brigades; Popular Resistance Committees
2014	2014	2014 Gaza War; Part of the Gaza–Israel conflict	Israel	Gaza Strip; Hamas; Palestinian Islamic Jihad; Popular Front for the Liberation of Palestine; Democratic Front for the Liberation of Palestine; Popular Resistance Committees; Abdullah Azzam Brigades; Jaysh al-Ummah; Al-Aqsa Martyrs' Brigades
2018	2018	November 2018 Gaza–Israel clashes Part of the Gaza-Israel conflict	Israel	Gaza Strip: Hamas; Islamic Jihad; PFLP; al-Aqsa Martyrs' Brigades; PRC
2019	2019	May 2019 Gaza–Israel clashes Part of the Gaza–Israel conflict	Israel	Gaza Strip: Hamas; Palestinian Islamic Jihad; National Resistance Brigades
2019	2019	November 2019 Gaza-Israel clashes Part of the Gaza–Israel conflict	Israel	Palestinian Islamic Jihad
2021	2021	2021 Israel–Palestine crisis Part of the Israeli–Palestinian conflict	Israel; Israel Defense Forces; Israeli Air Force; Israel Police; Israel Border Police; Shin Bet; Jewish Israeli protesters	Gaza Strip; Hamas; Palestinian Islamic Jihad; Popular Front for the Liberation of Palestine; Al-Aqsa Martyrs' Brigades; Smaller militant groups (Note: Besides Hamas and the Palestinian Islamic Jihad, FDD's Long War Journal identified the following militant groups as having fought in the 2021 conflict: Jihad Jibril Brigades, Humat al-Aqsa, Jaysh al-Ummah, Katibat al-Sheikh al-Emireen, Mujahideen Brigades, Abdul al-Qadir al-Husseini Brigades, and two al-Aqsa Martyrs Brigades splinter factions.); Protesters in Israel and Palestine: Arab Israeli protesters; Palestinian protesters in the West Bank and Jerusalem; Jordanian, Lebanese, and Syrian protesters (see international)
2022	2022	2022 Gaza–Israel clashes Part of the Israeli–Palestinian conflict	Israel: Israel Defense Forces; Israeli Air Force	(Palestine) Gaza Strip: Islamic Jihad Movement in Palestine (PIJ)
2023	2023	May 2023 Gaza–Israel clashes Part of the Gaza–Israel conflict	Israel	Islamic Jihad; Popular Front for the Liberation of Palestine
2023	2023	October 7 attacks: Alumim massacre; Be'eri massacre; Kfar Aza massacre; Netiv HaAsara massacre; Nir Oz attack; Nova music festival massacre; Psyduck music festival massacre; Zikim attack; Gaza war hostage crisis; Sexual and gender-based violence in the October 7 Hamas-led attack on Israel Part of the Israeli–Palestinian conflict, the Gaza war, and the Middle Eastern crisis	Hamas Allied political factions: Palestinian Islamic Jihad; Popular Resistance Committees; Popular Front for the Liberation of Palestine; Democratic Front for the Liberation of Palestine; Al-Aqsa Martyrs' Brigades; Palestinian Mujahideen Movement; Palestinian Freedom Movement	Israel
2023	Ongoing	Gaza war Part of the Gaza–Israel conflict, the Israeli–Palestinian conflict, and the Middle Eastern crisis (2023–present)	Israel (Note: See List of military aid to Israel during the Gaza war and American involvement) Israeli allies: Popular Forces (Note: Popular Forces have been described as a Salafi Jihadist organisation with alleged ties to the Islamic State. Several senior leaders in the Popular Forces also allied with the Islamic State in the Sinai.) (Note: From May 2024)	Hamas Palestinian allies: Palestinian Islamic Jihad Popular Front for the Liberation of Palestine Democratic Front for the Liberation of Palestine Al-Aqsa Martyrs' Brigades Palestinian Mujahideen Movement Palestinian Freedom Movement Popular Resistance Committees Popular Front for the Liberation of Palestine – General Command; (Palestine) Abdul al-Qadir al-Husseini Brigades Jaysh al-Ummah
2023	Ongoing (Note: Despite the ceasefire calling for Israel's full withdrawal, Israel only partially withdrew, maintaining an occupation force in parts of Southern Lebanon.)	Israel–Hezbollah conflict (2023–present); Part of the Hezbollah–Israel conflict, the Middle Eastern crisis (2023–present) and the Iran–Israel conflict during the Syrian civil war	Israel	Hezbollah Allies: Amal Islamic Group SSNP-L Hamas PIJ Popular Resistance Committees Popular Front for the Liberation of Palestine Islamic Resistance in Iraq (Yemen) Houthis Iran Syria (until 2024) Islamic Azz Brigades
2023	Ongoing	Red Sea crisis Part of the Iran–Israel proxy conflict, the Middle Eastern crisis (2023–present), and the Yemeni civil war (2014–present)	Houthi Yemen (Note: Political legitimacy of all Houthi-led government bodies has been rejected by the United Nations, rival Yemeni factions, the Gulf Cooperation Council, and the United States.): Houthis; Axis of Resistance; Iran (Note: Multiple sources indicate that the Iranian government has deployed military personnel to Houthi-controlled Yemen who are actively involved in attacks on commercial shipping.); Hezbollah; Islamic Resistance in Iraq	Israel Prosperity Guardian: United States; United Kingdom; Australia; Bahrain; Canada; Denmark; New Zealand; Norway; Seychelles; Singapore; Sri Lanka; Aspides: European Union; Belgium; Estonia; Finland; France; Germany; Greece; Italy; Latvia; Netherlands; Sweden; Independent Patrols: China; Egypt; India; Pakistan; Saudi Arabia
2024	2024 (Note: First phase: 1–19 April 2024 (18 days) Second phase: 31 July – 26 October 2024 (2 months and 26 days))	2024 Iran–Israel conflict Part of the Middle Eastern crisis (2023–present)	Iran; Supported by: Axis of Resistance: Ba'athist Syria; Houthis; Hezbollah; Islamic Resistance in Iraq; Badr Organization; True Promise Corps	Israel; Supported by: United States; United Kingdom; France; Jordan; Intelligence: Saudi Arabia; United Arab Emirates
