= Battle of Dilam =

1903 battle during the unification of Saudi Arabia

- Part of the Unification of Saudi Arabia
Date	27 January 1903
Location	Ad-Dilam, Emirate of Jabal Shammar (present-day Riyadh Province, Saudi Arabia)
Result	Saudi victory

Belligerents
Emirate of Jabal Shammar Supported by: Ottoman Empire	Third Saudi State; Emirate of Riyadh

Commanders and leaders
Abdulaziz bin Mutaib	Ibn Saud

Strength
4,000	3,500

Casualties and losses
250	160

The Battle of Dilam was a battle fought on 27 January 1903 between the Third Saudi State under Ibn Saud and the Emirate of Jabal Shammar under Abdulaziz bin Mutaib during the Unification of Saudi Arabia. The battle took place at Ad-Dilam, south of Riyadh, and ended in a Saudi victory.

== Background ==
A year after the Battle of Riyadh, Ibn Saud attempted to draw the Rashidis away from Riyadh with a campaign of misinformation. When his plan succeeded, Saud deployed 1,000 fighters in Riyadh before leaving the city with another 3,500 to capture Dilam. The Rashidis followed Ibn Saud to Dilam in order to finish him off and regain control of the town.

Ibn Saud had however borrowed money from Riyadh merchants and spent it purchasing ammunition and hiring specialist riflemen from Kuwait. Ibn Saud's forces took up fixed positions around Dilam, waited until the Rashidis were very close and then poured fire on them, forcing them to retreat. Further Rashidi attacks were met the same way. The next morning the Rashidi forces withdrew. They did not know that Ibn Saud's stock of ammunition was nearly depleted, and that further attacks might well have forced a Saudi retreat instead.

During the battle, the Rashidis suffered 250 casualties and lost control of southern Nejd.

== See also ==
- Unification of Saudi Arabia
- List of wars involving Saudi Arabia
- List of modern conflicts in the Middle East
