= Italian bombing of Mandatory Palestine in World War II =

Italian bombing of Mandatory Palestine
- Part of the Mediterranean and Middle East theatre of World War II
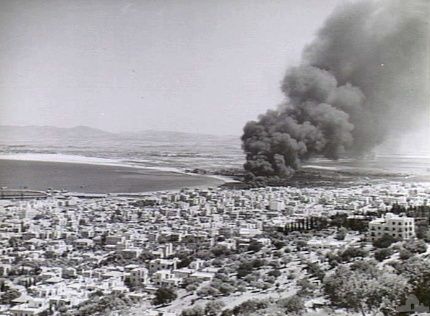
- Haifa refinery destroyed by airstrikes
Date	15 July 1940 – 3 September 1942
Location	Mandatory Palestine
Result	Italian victory

Belligerents
Italy (Nazi Germany) Germany; Vichy France	United Kingdom: Palestine; Yishuv; Australia

Casualties and losses
2 Italian aircraft lost and 1 damaged 2 Vichy French aircraft lost 3 German aircraft damaged	224–236 civilians and military and police personnel killed
- Most of the 80 bodies were beyond recognition

The Italian bombing of Mandatory Palestine in World War II was part of an effort by the Royal Italian Air Force (Regia Aeronautica) to strike at the United Kingdom by attacking those parts of the British Empire in the Middle East. The Luftwaffe and Vichy French Air Force also conducted attacks on Palestine.

== Background ==
On 10 June 1940, the Kingdom of Italy declared war on the French Republic and the United Kingdom. The Italian invasion of France was short-lived and the French signed an armistice with the Italians on 25 June, three days after France's armistice with Germany. This left the British and the forces of the Commonwealth of Nations for the Italians to contend with in the Middle East.

Successively on 19 October 1940, four Italian SM.82s bombers attacked American-operated oil refineries in the British Protectorate of Bahrain, damaging the local refineries. The raid also struck Dhahran in Saudi Arabia, but caused little damage.

== Bombing campaign ==
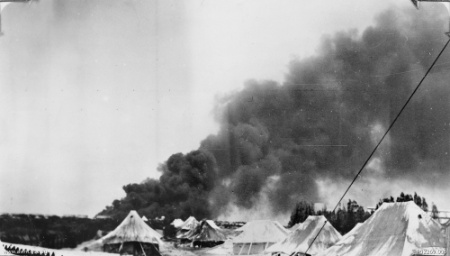
Smoke billowing from burning oil tanks after the first Italian raid on Haifa, 15 July 1940.

Italian bombers began attacking Mandatory Palestine in July 1940, continuing until June 1941. German and Vichy French bombers also attacked Palestine, although on a smaller scale. The attacks were primarily centered around Haifa, which was home to port facilities and oil installations, although Tel Aviv was also hit extensively and suffered the deadliest raid of the war. Other coastal towns such as Acre and Jaffa were also hit. The Italian raids were largely the initiative of Cesare Maria De Vecchi, the governor of the Italian Aegean Islands. De Vecchi was eager for his forces to see action and had a fair amount of autonomy in selecting targets.

The first Italian air raid occurred on 15 July 1940 when five Italian aircraft led by Major Ettore Muti struck the Iraq Petroleum Company installation in Haifa, setting three oil tanks on fire and damaging a power station, temporarily disrupting the city's electricity supply. Two Arab civilians were severely injured, one of whom later died. The second raid came on 24 July 1940, this time at the wish of the Supreme Command in Rome. Italian SM.79 bombers attacked eastern Haifa, aiming for the oil refineries and storage facilities. A total of 28 Arab and 15 Jewish civilians were killed along with one British constable. Most of the casualties were workers at a Shell Company installation but some were also hit on a street a few kilometers away from the refineries. The Italians claimed a huge success which the British did not deny. Time magazine, describing one of the raids, wrote that where the British oil pipeline from Kirkuk reached tidewater, "Ten big Italian bombers, flying at great altitude from the Dodecanese Islands, giving the British bases at Cyprus a wide berth, dropped 50 bombs on the Haifa oil terminal and refinery." The bombing started fires which burned for many days afterwards, and the refinery's production was blocked for nearly one month. British fighters from a base on Mount Carmel were too late to overtake the Italians returning to their base in Italian Dodecanese. After the first two attacks, many American citizens who worked at the oil refineries left Haifa. The Zionist leadership believed that local air defenses were insufficient, with the Jewish Agency requesting that the British transfer more aircraft to Haifa to defend the city. In a conversation with the Jewish Agency's Political Secretary, Moshe Sharett, the Chief Secretary of the Mandatory government explained that all aircraft in Egypt were being used to the fullest and could not be transferred. Italian aircraft carried out additional raids on Haifa on 6 and 27 August and on 6 and 8 September which were fairly ineffective and caused no fatalities.

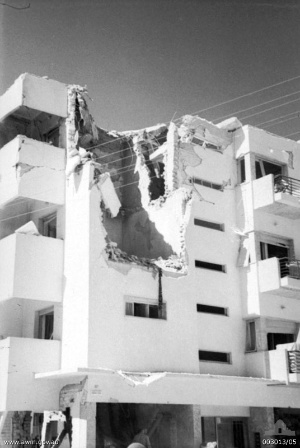
Building in Tel Aviv severely damaged by the September 1940 air raid on the city

On 9 September 1940, Italian aircraft bombed Tel Aviv in what was the deadliest air raid in Palestine during the war. Six Italian CANT Z.1007 Alcione bombers that had been launched from Rhodes dropped four tons of bombs on the city, which hit a residential area. According to historian Alberto Rosselli, the Italian bombers had been on their way to the strategic port and refineries of Haifa, but were intercepted by British aircraft. Forced to go back, the Italians received orders to drop their bombs on the port of Tel Aviv, but in attempting to avoid the attacking British planes they dropped the bombs by mistake on a civilian area near the port. De Vecchi reported to Rome that his aircraft had bombed installations and warehouses at the port of Jaffa. According to most accounts, 137 people were killed in the attack. Of the victims, most were Jews but some Arabs were also killed. Another analysis puts the figure at 125: 117 Jews, 7 Arabs, and one Australian soldier. Most of the victims had been standing in line to buy kerosene, which was heavily in demand during the war. One of the aircraft was lost on the way back to base.

Following this raid, the British recognized the need to strengthen air defenses in Palestine. Reluctant to divert anti-aircraft units from Britain or the port of Alexandria and Suez Canal in Egypt, the British decided to recruit Palestinian Jews as anti-aircraft gunners, a measure they had been reluctant to implement until then. On 13 September 1940, the British authorities secretly informed the Jewish Agency that a few dozen Jews would be allowed to join the British Army as anti-aircraft gunners. In October 1940, the British Army formally established the 1st Palestine Light Anti-Aircraft Battery. Men from the Haganah Jewish paramilitary organization were recruited. After a few months of training, it was deployed in early 1941, defending Haifa, the electricity plant at Naharayim, and the Dead Sea Works. The unit would play a role in the defense of Palestine for the rest of the period that air raids on Palestine were carried out. It would also be deployed alongside British forces elsewhere in the Mediterranean theater and its gunners were later recruited into the artillery regiment of the Jewish Brigade.

Meanwhile, the raids continued. On 21 September 1940, another Italian attack on Haifa was conducted, with the pilots reporting that they hit the oil refinery zone and military warehouses. An oil tank containing barrels of benzene was set on fire. Several bombs hit an Arab neighborhood in eastern Haifa, killing 40 Arab civilians and wounding 78. The attack caused work at the refinery to be temporarily suspended. Another Italian raid on Haifa targeting the refineries and port was launched on 26 September. From the photographs taken during the raid, the Italians correctly concluded that the lack of fires meant that work had stopped at the refinery. During the raid many of the bombs landed in the sea and one Italian bomber was hit by anti-aircraft fire, although it managed to return to base. Another Italian raid was launched against Haifa on 29 September. After this Italian air raids on Palestine did not occur for several months. The sole air attack on Palestine during this time occurred on the night of 17–18 January 1941, when a single German aircraft dropped several bombs between Jaffa and Ramla, causing little damage and no casualties.

The air attacks resumed after the Germans took the lead in the air war in the eastern Mediterranean. The first major German air raid took place on the early morning of 10 June 1941, when some 20 German aircraft that had taken off from Rhodes attacked Haifa. The attack caused little damage and injured a few Arab civilians. The Jewish anti-aircraft gunners of the 1st Palestine Light Anti-Aircraft Battery went into action for the first time, reportedly hitting three aircraft. Much of Haifa's Arab population temporarily fled in the aftermath of the raid. This was followed by another German raid against Tel Aviv and Haifa on the night of 11–12 June 1941. In Tel Aviv a nursing home was hit, killing 13 people and injuring 14. In Haifa one soldier was killed and a woman died of a heart attack as a result of the raid. In addition, a lone Vichy French Martin Maryland bomber attempted to attack Haifa on the same day and was chased by two Royal Australian Air Force fighters before being shot down by anti-aircraft fire.

Another two Vichy French air attacks took place on 2 July 1941. In the first attack, three bombers attacked Palestine, only managing to hit a prisoner of war camp for German and Italian prisoners, killing two prisoners and wounding 35. Later that same day, four bombers set out to attack Haifa and were engaged by anti-aircraft guns. One was shot down, and one of its crewmembers survived and was taken prisoner. After this there were several more ineffectual German and Italian raids throughout the rest of 1941 and 1942, focusing on Haifa but also hitting Kiryat Motzkin and Acre. The raids caused some property damage but no casualties. During one raid mines were also dropped in Haifa's harbor. The last such raid took place in September 1942. In addition, an Italian aircraft was shot down over Palestine by a British aircraft while on a reconnaissance mission in July 1941.

== Gallery ==
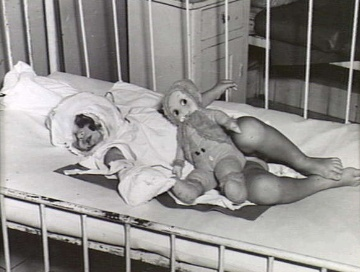
A casualty of the Italian bombing of Tel Aviv in hospital on 10 September 1940.

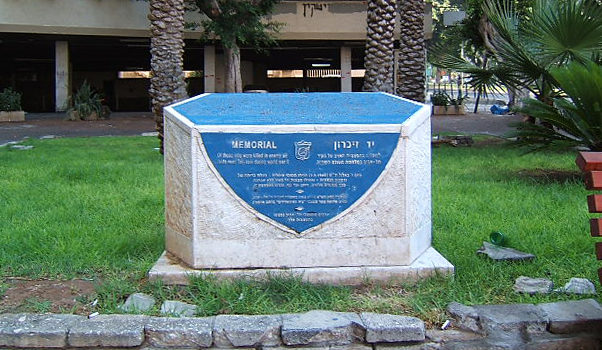
Memorial in Tel Aviv to the victims of the Italian raid on the city on 9 September 1940.

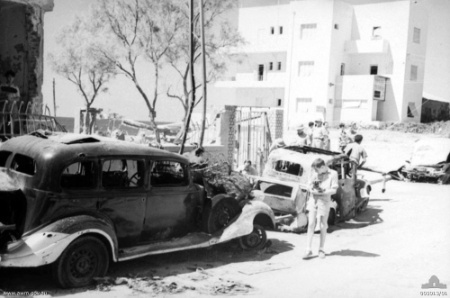
Damaged cars in Tel Aviv following the Italian bombing.

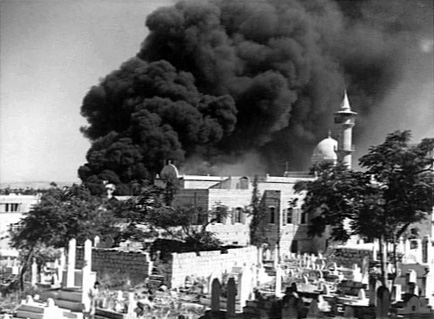
Destruction of Muslim graveyard and the Istiklal Mosque by Italian bombers during the bombing of Haifa, September 1940.

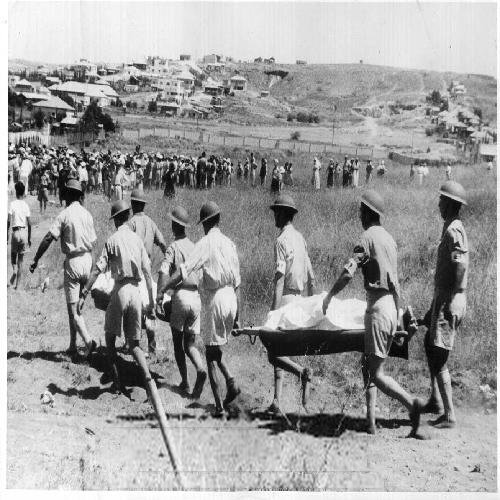
Funeral of victims of the bombing of Tel Aviv.

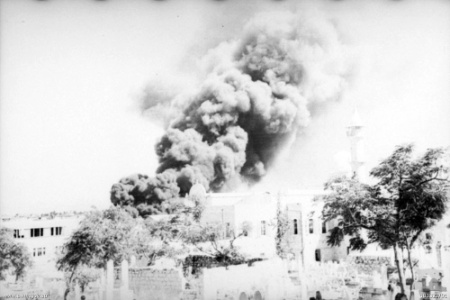
Oil tanks burning in Haifa as a result of bombing in October 1940.

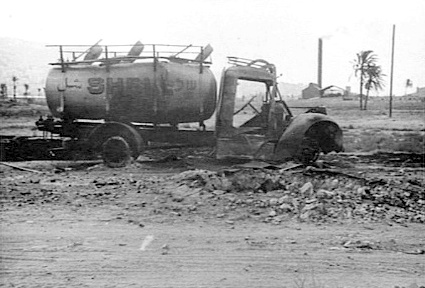
A burnt-out oil tanker truck after an Italian air raid on Haifa in July 1940.

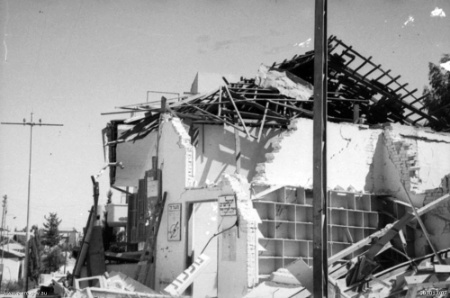
A ruined building in Tel Aviv in September 1940.

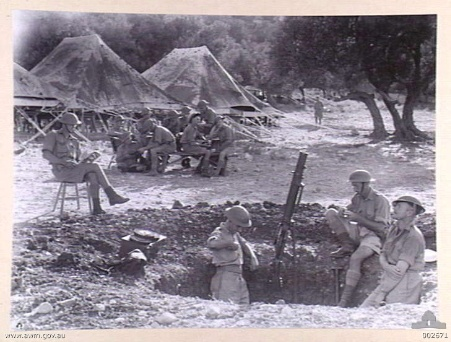
Anti-aircraft unit in Haifa in August 1940.

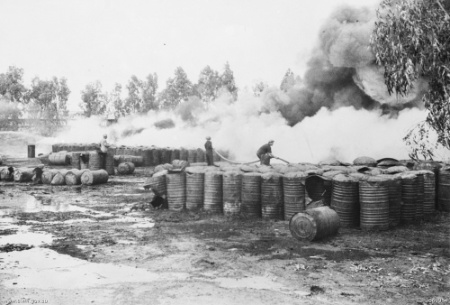
Firefighters work to extinguish a blaze at an oil installation after an Italian raid on Haifa in July 1940.

== See also ==
- Italian Royal Air Force (Regia Aeronautica)
- Bombing of Bahrain in World War II
