= Savoia-Marchetti SM.82 =

1939 bomber-transport aircraft family

SM.82
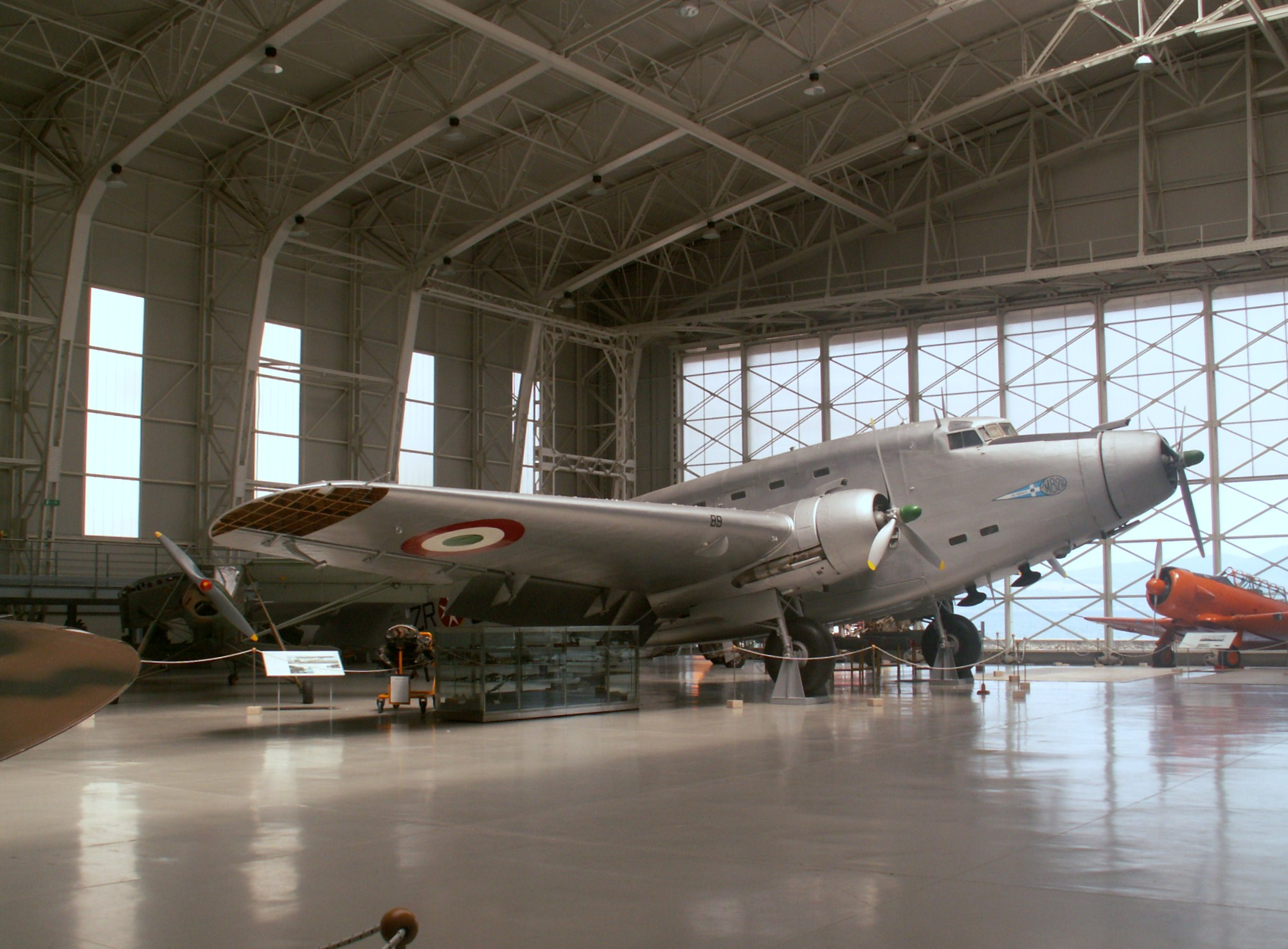
- Savoia Marchetti SM.82 at the Italian Air Force Museum

General information
- Type: Heavy bomber/transport
- Manufacturer: Savoia-Marchetti
- Primary users: Regia Aeronautica Luftwaffe; Aeronautica Nazionale Repubblicana; Aeronautica Militare
- Number built: 726 + 1 prototype

History
- Manufactured: 1939–1944
- Introduction date: 1940
- First flight: 1939
- Retired: After 1960

The Savoia-Marchetti SM.82 Marsupiale is an Italian bomber and transport aircraft of World War II. It was a cantilever, mid-wing monoplane trimotor with a retractable, tailwheel undercarriage. There were 875 (plus one prototype) built, the first entering service in 1940. Although able to operate as a bomber with a maximum bombload of up to 8,818 lb (4000 kg), the SM.82 saw very limited use in this role. The SM.82 was the foreign aircraft used in largest number by the Luftwaffe, which operated several hundreds of this aircraft, as a transport. Post-war about 30 SM.82s continued in service with the Aeronautica Militare Italiana, many remaining in service until the early 1960s.

== Development ==
The SM.82 was developed from the earlier SM.75 Marsupiale civil transport as a heavy bomber and military transport. Although having the same configuration of the SM.75, the SM.82 was larger. The aircraft was quickly developed and the prototype first flew in 1939. Although underpowered and slow, it was capable of carrying heavy loads, including the L3 light tank and a complete disassembled CR.42 fighter (these loads demanded special modifications). It had both cargo and troop transport capability, with room for up to 40 men and their equipment.

Deliveries to the Regia Aeronautica began in 1940. However, production rates were slow, with only 100 aircraft delivered in 1940, and another 100 in 1941, so that there were never enough of these aircraft in service. By 1942 production doubled to 200 a year, while in 1944 almost 300 were produced, by which time the factory was under the control of the Germans.

In 1939 it set a world's closed circuit distance record when it covered 10,000 km at an average speed of 239.67 km/h, remaining in the air for 56.5 hours. The aircraft saw extensive service throughout all the various African campaigns.

== Design ==
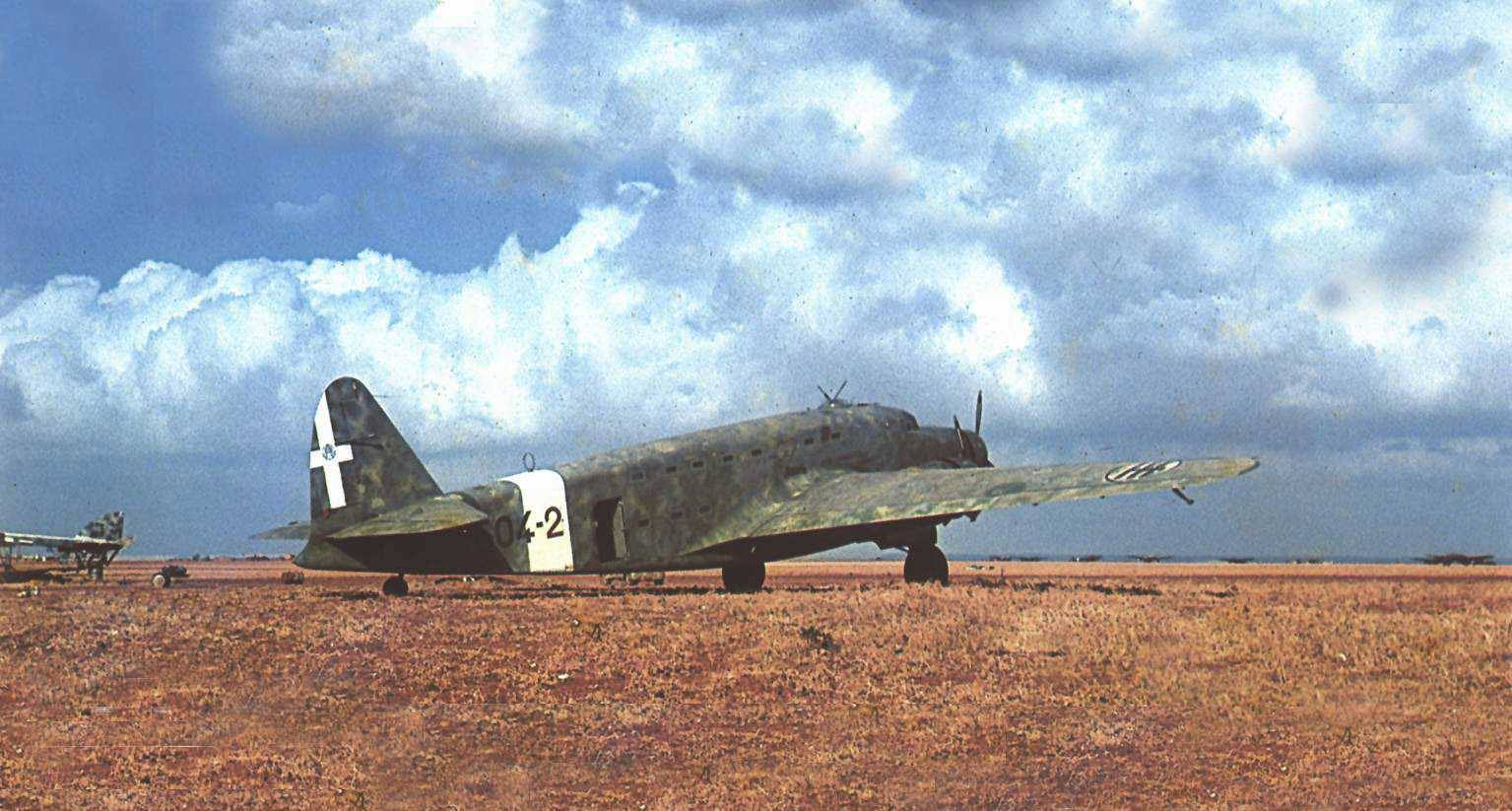
Rear starboard view of SM.82

The SM.82's fuselage was of mixed-construction, with welded-steel tube framework, with 22 frames and four longerons, skinned with metal forward, and plywood and fabric elsewhere. The wings were constructed almost entirely of wood, having three T-section spars, and 42 ribs in each. The flaps were made from a single piece of wood, while the ribs were of light and flexible poplar. The skin was of fabric-covered plywood, doped to be water-resistant. The ailerons (+13/-28°) occupied about half of the wing's trailing edge while Handley Page slats occupied the leading-edge. The tail had a conventional spruce structure and a plywood skin, while the rudder and elevators were a fabric-covered metal framework.

Inside, there were two levels. The upper level held seats for 32. The lower level was used for freight or to carry bombs when used in the bombing role, with two large duralumin bomb bay doors. The floor was made of wood, with nine detachable panels, that helped with the accommodation (through the bomb bay doors) of heavy loads. The cockpit held four: two pilots, with the first (on the left) with an armoured seat, a mechanic and an engineer/gunner.

Internal equipment comprised a radio-transmitter (AR8 and AR350), a fire extinguisher system, and an electrical generator. The instruments included altimeters, thermometers, compass, clock, and a Telefunken P63N radio goniometer.

The SM.82 was fitted with three 641 kW (860 hp) Alfa Romeo 128 RC.18 radial engines with aluminium and steel three-blade constant speed propellers 3.6 m (11 ft 9 in) in diameter. These engines were the ultimate evolution of the license-built Bristol Pegasus.

The aircraft had six self-sealing fuel tanks in each wing, three between the second and third spar, with a total of 1,276 L (337 US gal). Between the first and second spar there were another three fuel tanks with 653 L (173 US gal). Another tank in the nose, with 167 L (44 US gal) of 100 octane fuel (rather than 87) for the electric generator. The total weight of fuel amounted to 4,403 kg (9,707 lb), plus 136 L (36 US gal) of oil.

The SM.82 had both defensive and offensive armament. For offensive purposes it could carry a very wide range of ordnance, up to 4,000 kg (8,820 lb).

- 4 × 800 kg (1,760 lb)
- 8 × 500 kg (1,100 lb)
- 8 × 250 kg (550 lb)
- 27 × 50 kg (110 lb) or 100 kg (220 lb) bombs
- 25 × 100 kg (220 lb) cluster bombs, each containing 56 bomblets, though these were rarely used.

Control over bomb release was in the retractable ventral bombardier's gondola, equipped with a Jozza bombsight and also fitted with a rear-facing 7.7 mm (.303 in) Breda machine gun. Accommodation for the bombardier was far from ideal, being cramped, unheated, unpressurized, and not connected to the oxygen system. The 1 mm steel structure was also highly vulnerable to enemy fire.

For protection, only the first pilot's seat was armoured, while the self-sealing fuel tanks were proofed, theoretically, against 12.7 mm (.50 in) rounds, but did not have Carbon dioxide pressurization to prevent explosions if they were hit by tracer, incendiary or explosive rounds. No other armour was fitted. All this made it extremely vulnerable to enemy fire.

The main defensive weapon was a Caproni-Lanciani rotating dorsal turret, armed with a Scotti 12.7 mm (.50 in) machine gun with 350 rounds. This weapon was theoretically more powerful and lighter than the Breda-SAFAT, but reliability was a concern, and projectile dispersion was so wide as to reduce the theoretical range of 400 m (1,310 ft) to around 200 m (660 ft) in practice. Additional 7.7 mm (.303 in) Breda-SAFAT machine guns were mounted in each side and in the bombardier's gondola, with four 215-round magazines each. The gondola's machine gun was of little use given the cramped accommodation, and was often not fitted, even in the SM.82 equipped for the bombing role. German machine-guns were used in the Luftwaffe versions, with the 13 mm (.51 in) MG 131 in the turret. 7.92 mm (.312 in) MG 17s were used in some aircraft.

The SM.82's performance was modest, with a cruising speed only 250 km/h (160 mph) at 3,000 m (9,840 ft), even without the bombardier's gondola under the nose (which added more drag) it was slow, while its silhouette was large and easy to spot. The ceiling was seldom over 5,000 m (16,400 ft). This left the SM.82 well inside the operational altitude of most fighters of the time, as well as the effective range of heavy and medium anti-aircraft guns. In comparison, the B-17 had a typical ceiling of 6,000–8,000 m (19,690–26,260 ft),(note that the B-17 and B-24 Liberator both had unusually high operating ceilings for the time, as compared to other bomber and transport aircraft).

In operation, when faced with a fighter opposition, the SM.82 suffered a devastating loss rate. On 24 November 1942, three Beaufighters downed seven SM.82s, a 100% loss. Later on 10 April 1943, 10 out of 20 in formation were downed by a single pass of a P-38 Lightning squadron. At altitude, the SM.82 was almost a fixed target for both flak and fighter opposition.

== Operational history ==
=== Early missions ===
The first missions were to transport Italian troops to Libya, together with their heavy equipment, but the first two squadrons had only three SM.82s each. The first flights were made the beginning of June 1940, transporting 360 men of 61° Infantry Regiment.

Initially, the aircraft were organized in 149° Gruppo, with a SM.73 and SM.75. On the 17 June 1940 the first mission for all five aircraft of the Gruppo, transported ten anti-tank guns and 17 radio-communication units.

By 24 June, there were 11 aircraft employed in transporting men and equipment to Africa. Within a few weeks a further 25 were delivered. On 24 June, the first SM.82 was lost during a resupply mission in the desert.

In July 1940, a series of bombing missions to Gibraltar was organized, with 1,000 kg (2,200 lb) of bombs in each aircraft. The first bombing mission was on 17 July 1940 with three SM.82s taking off from Guidonia at 1940, and flying 1,600 km (995 mi) to arrive over Gibraltar eight hours later at 0340. Another mission was launched from Sardinia to shorten the journey, then another on 20 August, this time by 32° Wing. However one of the two aircraft, carrying a 1,000 kg (2,210 lb) bombload, was shot down. The other two aircraft in 32° Wing were reassigned to transport squadrons.

In mid-1940, 41° Group was sent to Rhodes with three SM.82s, and other four in October, for the special mission to the British-controlled oil refineries at Manama in the Persian Gulf. This meant a flight of 4,200 km (2,610 mi), lasting 15 hours at 270 km/h (170 mph), that was for the time arguably a record for a bombing mission. Four SM.82s took off from Rhodes, under the command of Ettore Muti. Each aircraft carried a load of 1,500 kg (3,310 lb). This long-range action was successful, taking the target totally by surprise, and the SM.82s landed without problems at Zula. This raid caused the Allies some concern, forcing them to upgrade their defences. This, more than the limited amount of damage caused, further stretched Allied military resources.

The scarcity of SM.82s hampered further long-range missions, though some actions were carried out. Six single aircraft night bombing missions were mounted, mainly against Alexandria, in October and November 1940. All these missions were performed by SM.82s of 114° Gruppo, but all of their aircraft were destroyed or damaged by the time of Operation Compass in December 1940.

=== East African Campaign ===
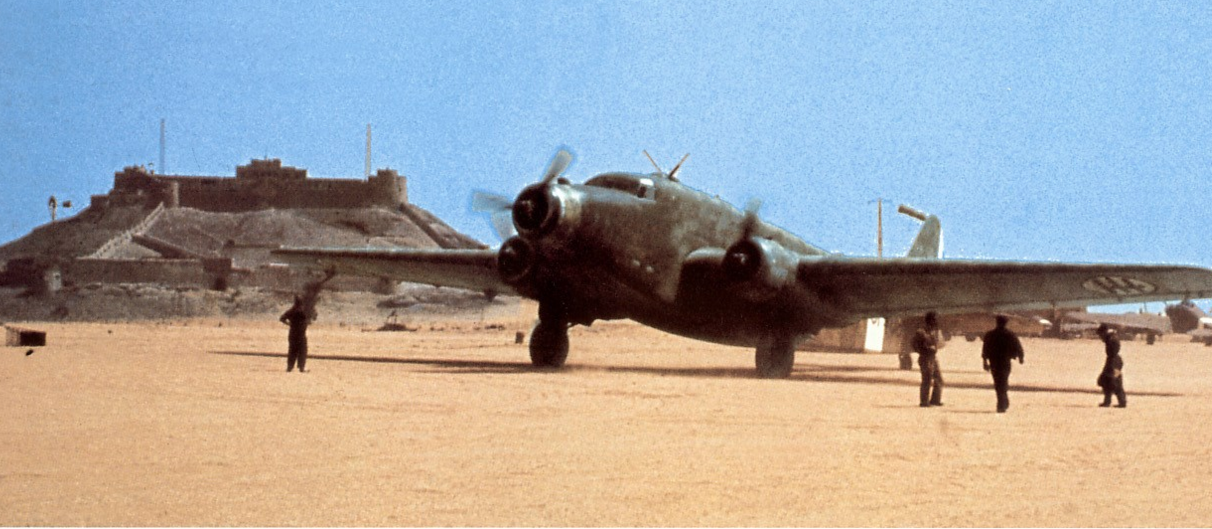
A SM.82 at Fezzan, southern Libya

The need for transport aircraft meant that, apart from occasional special operations, like dropping paratroops, the SM.82s were used solely in this role; especially to maintain contact with Eastern Africa which was more and more isolated from the rest of the Italian forces.

Italy at that time had control of part of East Africa (AOI, Africa Orientale Italiana), and needed a long-range supply aircraft to support its troops fighting the East African Campaign.

149° Gruppo flew many missions over the Adriatic, and to Ethiopia, despite the fact that the pilots were convinced that given the strong, contrary winds, the slow SM.82s would be unable to return to Libya.

The missions to eastern Africa were carried out with a 1,300 L (340 US gal) auxiliary tank fitted, and the first mission was successfully performed on 27 July 1940, between Benghazi (Libya) and Asmara (Eritrea). However, on the fourth mission aircraft MM.60277 overran the airstrip and was largely destroyed by fire. 149° Gruppo flew 330 missions with its S.82s, S.75s and S.83s. By the end of 1940, the SM.82s had logged 5,187 hours flight time, with 16,267 passengers and 2,247 tonnes of materials.

On 24 August 1940, the first delivery of a Fiat CR.42 fighter was made to Eastern Africa. By April 1941, 51 CR.42s and 51 reserve engines had been delivered, but despite this effort the AOI fell to the Allies in May 1941.

In March 1941, 32° Wing received some new SM.82s, and organized five bombing missions over Gibraltar in June and July, always with only one aircraft. On 1 April 1942, another attack was made by three aircraft that dropped 18 160 kg (353 lb) bombs. All this accounted for just eight attacks in almost two years on this key British position, with around twenty aircraft (between one and three each time), and a little more than a tonne of bombs delivered by each aircraft.

=== North Africa ===
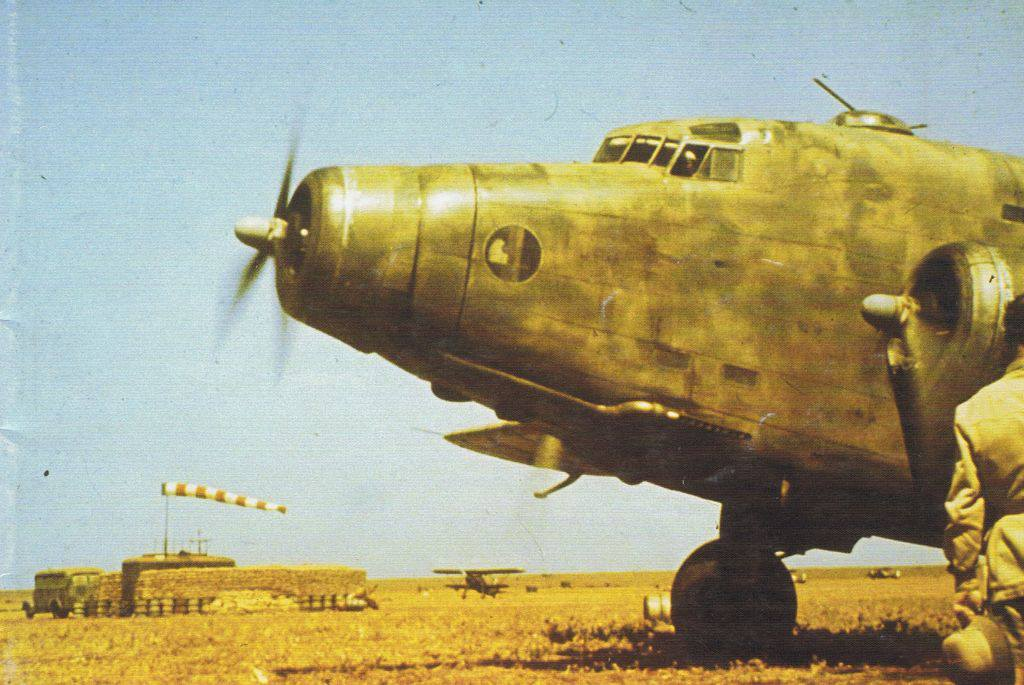
A SM.82 at an airfield in North Africa

The Special Bombing Section was constituted, with only two SM.82s, on 10 April 1941, and another five aircraft were delivered later. They performed only a few missions as bombers, including two over Alexandria in May and June, before being used as transports.

On 1 March 1941, 146° Gruppo was formed with 17 SM.82s, one SM.79 and one Ca.164. 146° Gruppo, along with 145° and 149° Gruppo, were mainly involved in transport missions to North Africa. In May 1941 during the Anglo-Iraqi War the Iraqis requested help from Axis air forces, and SM.82s flew several missions via Syria carrying a total of 18 tonnes of equipment and 25 persons.

In July 1941 37° Gruppo was equipped with SM.82s. In 1942, 18° Wing, and then 44°, 45°, and 48° Wing were equipped with the aircraft. From the end of 1942, these aircraft flew many supply missions across the Mediterranean, until Operation Flax in April 1943 ended the air bridge to Axis forces in Tunisia.

The SM.82 suffered many losses. In December 1941, six were destroyed by Bristol Blenheims at Castelvetrano airfield in a single night. In the last months of the North African campaign, SM.82s were used to send troops and materials, even though it was clear that this campaign was lost after El Alamein. Around 100 SM.82 were shot down or destroyed on the ground between November 1942 and April 1943.

Among other episodes, on 2 November 1942, seven (or six depending on source) SM.82s were forced to land (or crashed) by only three Beaufighters. On 12 November 1942, six Beaufighters downed an entire formation of five SM.82s. On 22 November, ten SM.82s were attacked by three Beaufighters, causing much damage and killing or wounding many of the troops inside the unarmoured aircraft. On 10 April 1943, another seven were downed, four more on 16 April, and finally on 19 April 1943 twelve SM.82, one SM.75, and three Fiat G.12s were downed or forced to land.

Attacks on airfields destroyed five SM.82s at Benina airfield (19 km/12 mi east of Benghazi), three at Tunis on 22 January 1943, and three on 24 March. At Castelvetrano, 11 SM.82s were destroyed on 13 April. During the attacks on Rome on 19 July 1943, eight S.82s were destroyed and seven damaged at Urbe airfield, and four SM.82s were destroyed, and 14 damaged over Ciampino. Both in the air or on the ground, SM.82s were easy targets.

145° Group, usually a transport unit, was also equipped with some bomber versions and attacked enemy targets in Marmarica and Egypt in four night raids in June 1942. On 3 July a single aircraft bombed the El Haman airfield in Libya.

Another four aircraft flew from Rodi airfield to bomb Alexandria, but after only four missions, all four aircraft were taken out of service. In July 1943 there were bombing missions over Sicily, to interdict enemy landings, like the one that dropped 20 cluster bombs (100 kg/220 lb and 28 bomblets each) over Comiso.

These missions were only a nuisance to the Allies, even if they forced them to assign first line air defences and interceptors to counter the threat. This was the main reason for the Italians to mount these missions, although only a total of 100 sorties were flown in three years of war, with an average of 1,000–1,500 kg (2,200–3,310 lb) bombload, and the use of some of the best aviators of the Regia Aereonautica. The most successful missions for the SM-82 were in the paratrooper transport role. Several special paratrooper models were made, but all were used by simply putting wooden planks in the bomb bay to stand on. Over 15 combat air drops were made successfully with few losses in Italy, Africa, Greece and Russia.

=== Luftwaffe ===
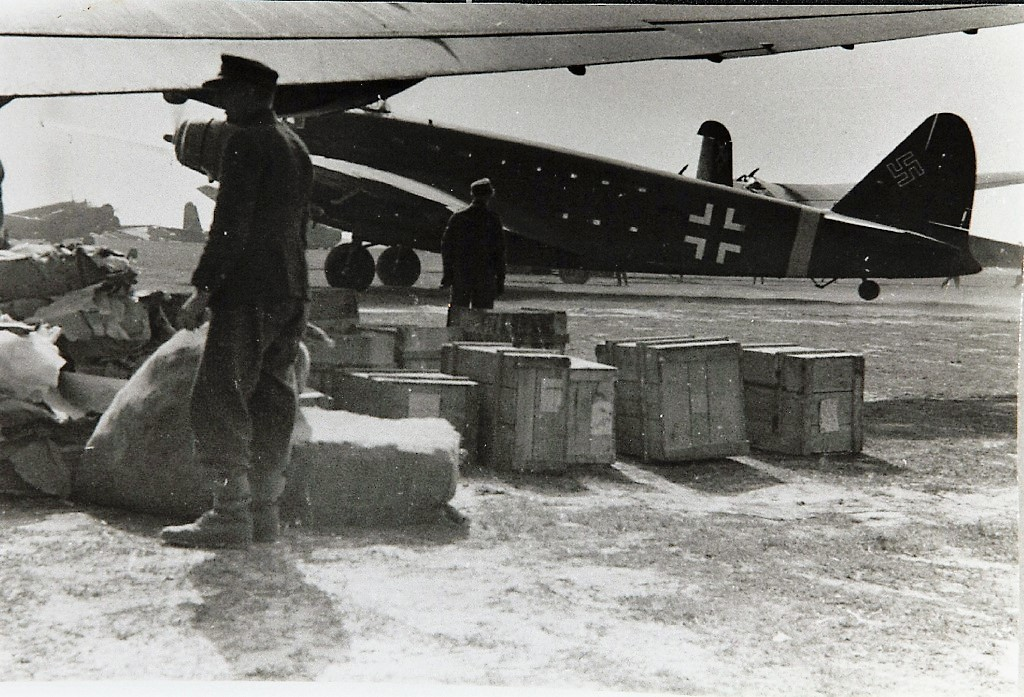
SM.82 of the Luftwaffe

Between 1942 and Spring 1943, FliegerTransportGruppe "Savoia" operated 100 Savoia-Marchettis. After September 1943, SIAI kept on producing SM.82 for Luftwaffe, delivering 299 planes. Other Marsupiali were captured after the 8 September armistice. These aircraft had better capabilities as transports than the Junkers Ju 52, the standard transport aircraft of the Luftwaffe, though the Ju 52 was much more robust, being all metal. Under German insignia, the Savoia-Marchettis were operated mostly by 6th Luftflotte and ReichLuftflotte on Eastern front and in Northern Germany, up to the end of war, but little is recorded of the activities of these aircraft in the last 18 months of the war as most were ad-hoc units. Records were either not kept or were destroyed.

=== After the armistice ===
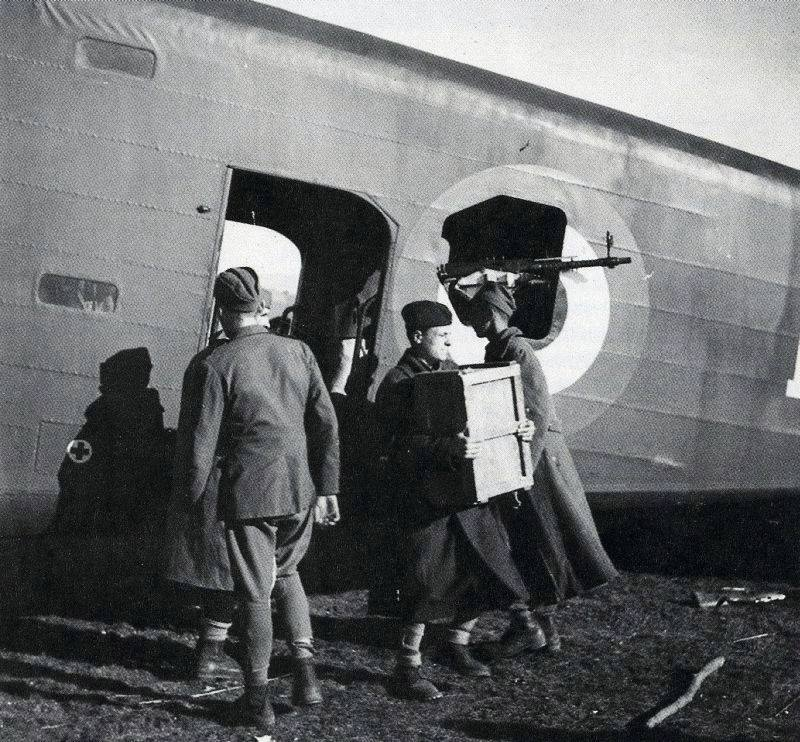
Co-Belligerent Air Force SM.82

After the Armistice of 8 September 1943, only 29 aircraft were operated by the Italian Co-Belligerent Air Force in Southern Italy.

The Aeronautica Nazionale Repubblicana of the Italian Social Republic, the fascist puppet state installed by Germany in northern Italy, operated about 60 aircraft, 40 of which assigned to 2° Gruppo A.T. "M.O. Trabucchi" that flew on Eastern front.

After the conflict, about 30 SM.82s continued in service with the Aeronautica Militare until the early 1960s.

=== Civil transport ===
Even with the outbreak of the war long-range civilian routes did not end. The civil aircraft had 14 seats, 1,306 L (345 US gal) of additional fuel, and 350 kg (770 lb) of military equipment removed. They flew to Brazil via Spain and West Africa. Between 11 September 1940 and the entry of Brazil into the war in 1941, 68 flights were made. Two aircraft, I-BAIA and I-BRAZ, were lost in December 1940. Some S.82s were used in militarized service, with Special Air Services and the task of personnel transport, including the civilian evacuations in 1941.

== Variants ==
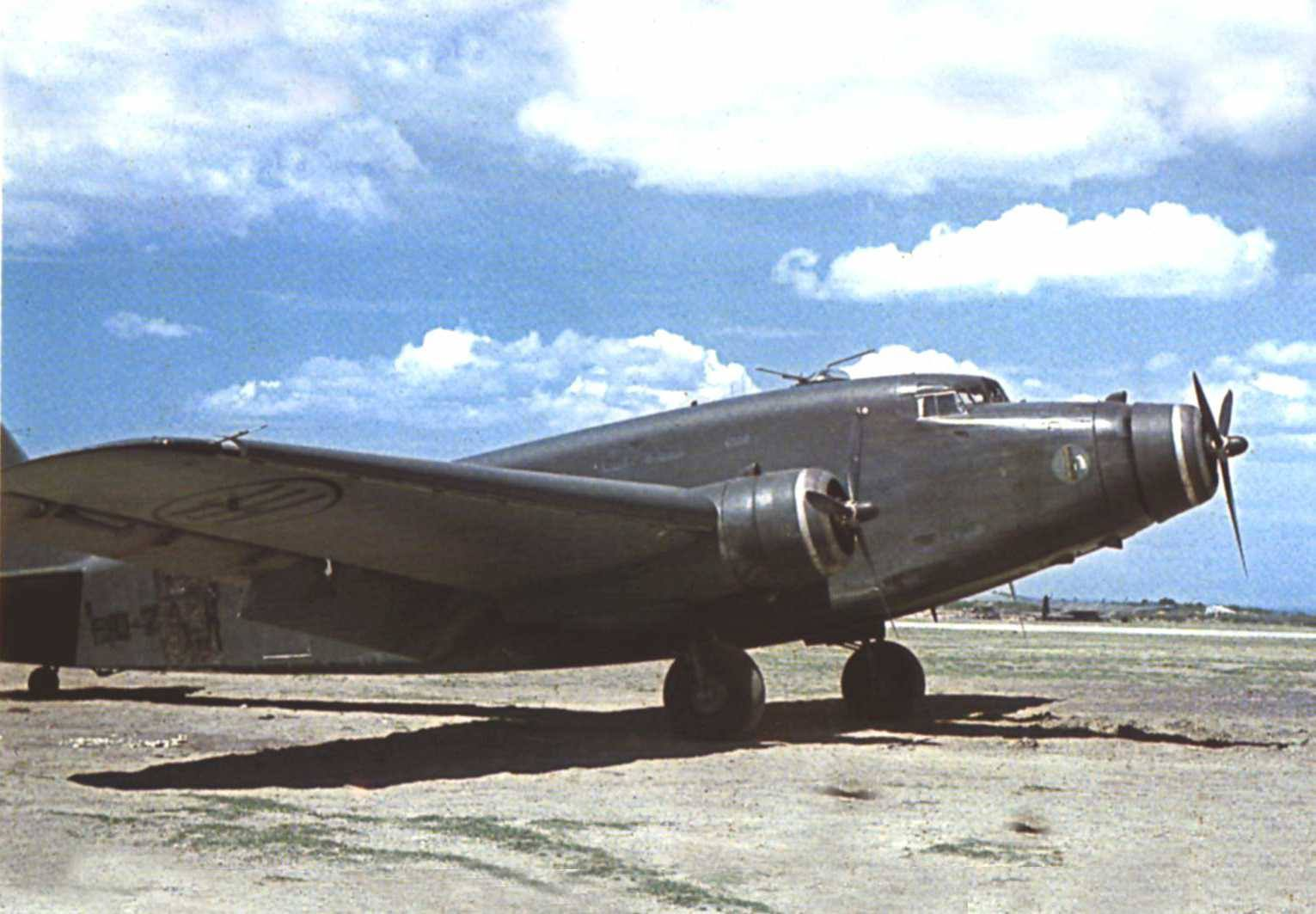
Savoia-Marchetti SM.82

Although the basic design of the SM.82 remained the same there were many configurations and modifications in the 10 series manufactured from 1940 to 1945.

SM.82
This was the standard version, a transport aircraft with 32 seats, or room for up to 50 men, produced in the following series:

- I, 50 aircraft (MM.60260-60319) (December 1939 – December 1940)
- II, 20 aircraft (MM.60320-60339) (December 1940 – February 1941)
- III, 30 aircraft (MM.60483-60512) (March 1941 – June 1941)
- IV, 50 aircraft (MM.60586-60635) ( July 1941 – December 1941)
- V, 62 aircraft (MM.60721-60782) (January 1942 – August 1942)
- VI, 102 aircraft (MM.60783-60884) (July 1942 – December 1942)
- VII, 102 aircraft (MM.61175-61276) (March 1942 – July 1943)
- VIII, 10 aircraft (MM.61314-61323) (July 1943 – December 1943)
- VIII, 80 aircraft (MM.61398-61477) (July 1943 – November 1943)
- IX, 120 aircraft (MM.61513-61632) ( November 1943 – April 1944)
- X, 100 aircraft ordered, but only 87 built (MM.61782-61881) (April 1944 – September 1944)

SM.82 (Bomber)
With a bombardier's gondola and bomb racks. 68 aircraft were ordered, and others were modified to this standard, at least partially.
SM.82 Carro armato
Four aircraft were modified to carry the L3/35 light tank.
SM.82 Trasporto caccia
With modified ventral doors to accommodate a disassembled FIAT CR.32, then adapted for a FIAT CR.42. Only two aircraft (MM.60293 and MM.60294) were so ordered, and when used to deliver the aircraft to East Africa (a total of 51 aircraft) were fitted with two auxiliary fuel tanks (1,300 L/340 US gal each), and one additional oil tank (200 L/50 US gal).
SM.82 Trasporto motori
Two aircraft used to transport aircraft engines (MM.60290 and MM.60292) to Africa.
SM.82P
21 aircraft of the VIII series, modified for the use of paratroops.
SM.82 tanker
Two aircraft to transport up to 3,000 L (790 US gal) of fuel. Weight: 11,300–18,700 kg (24,910–41,230 lb).
SM.82bis
80 aircraft of series VIII, for night bombing, with 887 kW (1,190 hp) Piaggio P.XI engines. They were also fitted with the AR.128 engine, some in the S.82P and the S.82T versions.
SM.82 LATI
For international airlines. With ten seats, automatic pilot, toilet, enhanced radios, two additional fuel tanks of 653 L (173 US gal) each increased the range to 4,800 km (2,983 mi) at 250 km/h (155 mph). Maximum weight: 19,000 kg (41,888 lb). Only a few were built.
SM.82LW
Version for the Luftwaffe, with turrets and radios. 231 were in service in early 1944 in the "Savoia Gruppen", and were widely used in long range transport missions.
S.82PD
An SM.75 modified for distance records, with 333 km/h (207 mph) over 1,000 km (620 mi) and 1,000 kg (2,200 lb), and 12,937 km (8,039 mi) in 57 h 32 min on 30 July-1 August 1939.
S.82PW
20 S.82s modified postwar with Pratt & Whitney R-1830 engines. Weight 12,100/18,700 kg (26,680/41,230 lb), max speed 381 km/h (237 mph), ceiling 6,000 m (19,690 ft). They served until 3 August 1960, and MM.61187 is preserved in its silver postwar colour scheme, in the Italian Air Force Museum at Vigna di Valle.

Experimental versions included MM.61408 with a central 1,007 kW (1,350 hp) Alfa Romeo 135 engine, while MM.60591 had three Piaggio P.XI from 31 October-7 November 1941. On 13 February 1942, Piaggio P.XIXs were installed. There were many other non-standard engine modifications; one was fitted with superchargers that gave a ceiling of the aircraft up to 10,000 m (32,810 ft), but the engines were worn out and the superchargers were removed.

== Operators ==
Germany

- Luftwaffe

Independent State of Croatia

- Zrakoplovstvo Nezavisne Države Hrvatske operated two aircraft as transports.

Kingdom of Italy

- Regia Aeronautica
- Italian Co-Belligerent Air Force

Sovereign Military Order of Malta

operated some surviving aircraft during a period in which Italy was forbidden from owning bomber aircraft post-WW2. They returned the planes in the early 1950s

Italian Social Republic

- Aeronautica Nazionale Repubblicana

Italy

- Italian Air Force operated some surviving aircraft until 1960

== Specifications (SM.82) ==
Data from The Concise Guide to Axis Aircraft of World War II

General characteristics

- Crew: 4
- Capacity: 40 troops
- Length: 22.9 m (75 ft 2 in)
- Wingspan: 29.68 m (97 ft 5 in)
- Height: 6 m (19 ft 8 in)
- Wing area: 118.6 m^{2} (1,277 sq ft)
- Empty weight: 10,550 kg (23,259 lb) (transport)

11,200 kg (24,692 lb) (bomber)

- Max takeoff weight: 18,020 kg (39,727 lb) (transport)

18,410 kg (40,587 lb) (bomber)

- Powerplant: 3 × Alfa Romeo 128 R.C.21 9-cylinder air-cooled radial piston engines, 708 kW (949 hp) each
- Propellers: 3-bladed constant-speed propellers

Performance

- Maximum speed: 347 km/h (216 mph, 187 kn)
- Cruise speed: 250 km/h (160 mph, 130 kn) at 3,000 m (9,800 ft)
- Stall speed: 110 km/h (68 mph, 59 kn)
- Range: 2,100 km (1,300 mi, 1,100 nmi)
- Service ceiling: 6,000 m (20,000 ft)

Armament

- Guns:

- 1 × 12.7 mm (.5 in) Scotti machine gun in dorsal turret
- 3 × 7.7 mm (.303 in) Breda-SAFAT machine guns in ventral and lateral positions

- Bombs:

- 4,000 kg (8,818 lb) bombload

== See also ==
Related development

- SM.75 Marsupiale

Aircraft of comparable role, configuration, and era

- Junkers Ju 52/3m

Related lists

- List of aircraft of World War II
- List of bomber aircraft
- List of Regia Aeronautica aircraft used in World War II

== Sources ==
- Catalanotto, Baldassare. SIAI SM. 82 (Ali d'Italia 14). Torino, Italy: La Bancarella Aeronautica, 2000
- Ciglić, B. (2020). Savoia Marchetti SM.79 The Yugoslav Story, Operational Record 1939–1947. Beograd: Jeroplan. ISBN 978-86-909727-5-3.
- Lembo, Daniele. "SIAI SM.82 Marsupiale" Aerei Nella Storia, Issue 22. Parma, Italy: West-ward Edizioni, 2002, p. 10–31. (in Italian)
- Mondey, David. The Concise Guide to Axis Aircraft of World War II. New York: Bounty Books, 1996. ISBN 1-85152-966-7.
- Mondey, David. The Hamlyn Concise Guide to Axis Aircraft of World War II. London: Bounty Books, 2006. ISBN 0-7537-1460-4.
- Pini, Giorgio and Setti, Fulvio. Savoia Marchetti SM 82 marsupiale (Le Macchine e la Storia – Profili 5). Modena, Italy: STEM-Mucchi spa., 1994 (in Italian)
