= Bombing of Bahrain in World War II =

Italian bombing of Bahrain
- Part of World War II
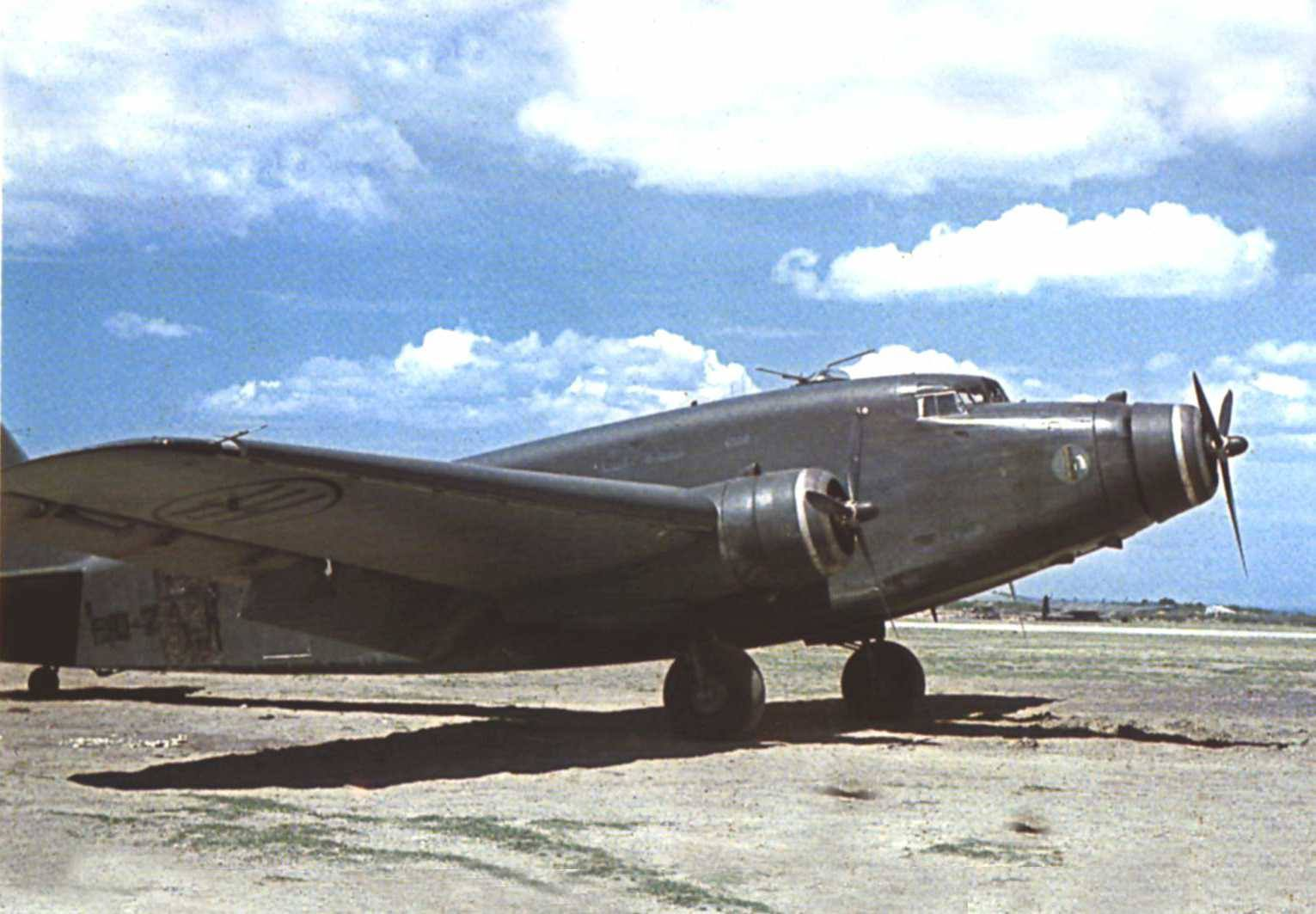
- SM.82s similar to those used in the Italian raid on Bahrain
Date	19 October 1940
Location	Bahrain and Dhahran, Saudi Arabia
Result	Italian victory

Belligerents
Italy	United Kingdom: Bahrain; Saudi Arabia

Commanders and leaders
(Kingdom of Italy) Ettore Muti	(United Kingdom) Charles Geoffrey Prior (Bahrain) Hamad ibn Isa Al Khalifa (Saudi Arabia) Ibn Saud

Strength
4 Savoia-Marchetti SM.82.	Few airplanes, exact number unknown

Casualties and losses
None	Damage to Bahrain oil facilities Dhahran slightly damaged

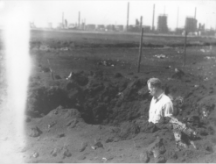
Aftermath of the bombing in Bahrain.

The bombing of Bahrain in World War II was part of an effort by the Italian Royal Air Force (Regia Aeronautica) to strike at the British interests wherever possible in the Middle East. It was successful in forcing the diversion of already-limited Allied resources to an obscure theater originally thought to be safe.

== Background ==
On 10 June 1940, the Kingdom of Italy declared war on the French Republic and the United Kingdom. The Italian invasion of France was short-lived and the French signed an armistice with the Italians on 25 June, three days after France's armistice with Germany. This left the British and the forces of the Commonwealth of Nations for the Italians to contend with in the Middle East.

In summer 1940, the Italian leader and Prime Minister Benito Mussolini received a plan to destroy the oil fields in Bahrain in order to disrupt the oil supplies to the British Navy. The plan was suggested by the Italian test pilot, Air Force Captain Paolo Moci.

== Bahrain and Dhahran ==
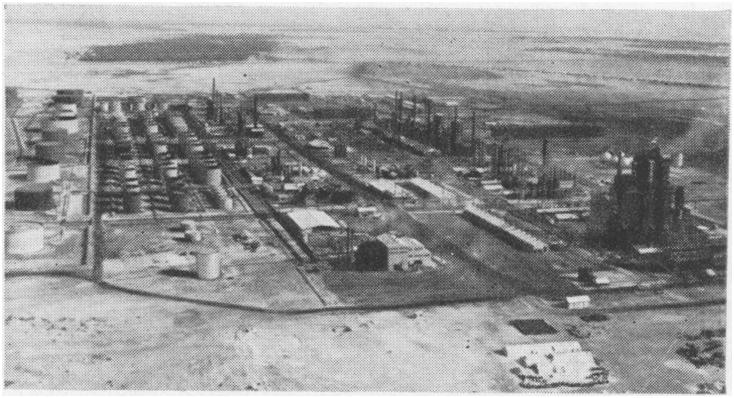
Aerial view of Bahrain Refinery, circa 1949.

Early on 19 October 1940, four Italian SM.82 bombers attacked and damaged the oil refinery of the Bahrain Petroleum Company (joint venture of Standard Oil of California and Texaco) in the British Protectorate of Bahrain. The raid also struck Dhahran in Saudi Arabia, but causing only some minor damage.

Indeed, in order to strike the British-controlled oil refineries at Manama in the Persian Gulf, these SM.82 bombers undertook a flight of 4,200 km (2,610 mi), lasting 15 hours at 270 km/h (170 mph), that was for the time arguably a record for a bombing mission. The force took off from the island of Rhodes, in the Aegean Sea, and each aircraft carried a bomb load of 1,500 kgs (3,310 lbs). This long-range action was successful, taking the target totally by surprise, and the SM.82s landed without problems at Zula, Eritrea. The Italian airplanes started their flight from Europe, attacked refineries in Asia and landed back in Africa (Italian Eritrea).

During the attack 132 bombs of 15 kgs each were dropped, that heavily damaged two refineries.

The raid caused the Allies some concerns, forcing them to upgrade their defenses. This, more than the limited amount of damage caused, further stretched Allied military resources.

The Italian Command intended to employ the special SM82s to bomb the English oil plants of Manama, in the Persian Gulf, in order to show the potential ability of the Italian air force. It was a long and difficult mission involving a 4,000 kilometre flight. Ettore Muti and his comrades spent four days working on a complete revision of the plans and established a complex flight plan. ... On October 18, at 5.10 pm, after filling both the normal and the supplementary tanks, they loaded three out of four SM82s with 1.5 tons of incendiary and explosive bombs weighing 15, 20 or 50 kilograms. Then the four three-engine bombers took off. In command of the first aircraft, which gained height with difficulty from the Rhodes-Gadurrà runway because it was overloaded with 19,500 kilograms, was Lieutenant Colonel Muti. He was assisted by Major Giovanni Raina and by Captain Paolo Moci, who had previous experience in flying planes overloaded up to 21 tons. ... The SM82s, after gaining height (a manoeuvre which took remarkable efforts because of the enormous weight of the aircraft) headed east, flying over Cyprus, Lebanon and Syria, bending to the southeast as they went past Jordan and Iraq until they reached the Persian Gulf. During the very long outward flight, the role of Muti's SM82 pathfinder proved its essential function in leading the squadron. ... At 2.20 am, just before reaching the Bahrain Islands, Lieutenant Colonel Federici's aircraft suddenly lost sight contact with Muti's SM82 and had to drop its bombs on different targets in the vicinity of Manama, while the other planes hit the fixed target. As bombardier Raina later told "the operation of spotting the target was easy thanks to the total illumination of the extractive and refinery plants" which were partially damaged by the bombs (half a dozen wells and some oil deposits were set on fire). As soon as they perceived the glares of the first explosions, the Italian planes made off along the escape route landing to the Zula runway (Eritrea) at 8 8:40.The whole Italian formation had flown 2,400 kilometres in 15.30 hours. At the Eritrean airport, along with a small crowd of Italian aviators, the brave pilots found the fourth SM82 squadron which, in the meantime, had come from Rhodes as a support plane on the way back, should one of the crafts make an emergency landing in the desert. — Alberto Rosselli

Rome declared that their bombers had set a new distance record, covering 3,000 miles on the outgoing trip from bases located in the island of Rhodes. American magazine Time wrote that the Italians insisted that the planes had been refueled from submarine tankers though in actuality, the planes had simply been loaded with fuel.

Ettore Muti, party secretary of the National Fascist Party, took part in the Bahrain raid and in at least one of the bombings of Haifa, where another refinery was the target.

The Bahrain raid was followed by other long-distance Italian raids on Ethiopia and Eritrea in 1942, and would have been repeated -with an advanced SM.82 bomber- in a raid on New York City in summer 1943 that never became true. Italians also flew from Rome to Tokyo in summer 1942.

== See also ==
- Italian bombing of Mandatory Palestine in World War II
- Italian Royal Air Force (Regia Aeronautica)

== Bibliography ==
- Lembo, Daniele. "SIAI SM.82 Marsupiale". Aerei Nella Storia, Issue 22. Parma, Italy: West-ward Edizioni, 2002, p. 10–31.
