= 1933 Palestine riots =

Period of violent riots and civil disorder in Mandatory Palestine

The 1933 Palestine riots (Hebrew: מאורעות תרצ"ד, Me'oraot Tartsad) were a series of violent riots in Mandatory Palestine, as part of the intercommunal conflict in Mandatory Palestine. The riots erupted on 13 October 1933 when the police broke up a banned demonstration organized by the Arab Executive Committee. The riots came as the culmination of Arab resentment at Jewish migration after it surged to new heights following the rise of Nazi Germany, and at the British Mandate authorities for allegedly facilitating Jewish land purchases. The second mass demonstration, at Jaffa in October, turned into a bloodbath when police fired on the thousands-strong crowd, killing 19 and injuring some 70. The "Jaffa massacre", as Palestinians called it, quickly triggered further unrest, including a week-long general strike and urban insurrections that resulted in police killing 7 more Arabs and wounding another 130 with gunfire.

== Background ==
The sectarian violence in Mandatory Palestine between Jewish and Arab communities began with the 1920 Syrian crisis and consequent defeat of the Arab Syrian nationalists in the Franco-Syrian War. Serious disturbances erupted in British controlled territory as a fallout of the war, but the return of hard line Palestinian Arab nationalists to Jerusalem from Damascus, led by Haj Amin al-Husseini, essentially shifted the conflict to local intra-communal topics. Serious eruptions of violence followed in 1921 and 1929.

Tensions between Jews and Arabs were driven by competing ideologies over the right to the land of Palestine. Jewish immigration and land ownership had been increasing from the Ottoman era, leading to fears amongst both Palestinian Christians and Muslims.

== The events ==
Report of the Commission of Inquiry

The events of October 1933 had five phases:

- Jerusalem, 13 October
- Jaffa, 27 October
- Haifa, 27–28 October
- Nablus, 27 October
- Jerusalem, 28–29 October

As a response to Zionist calls for unrestricted immigration and promulgation of an Immigration Bill that allowed for greater opportunities, the Arab Executive Committee (AEC) on 8 October called for a general strike and demonstration on 13 October. The acting High Commissioner reminded the AEC that political demonstrations had been banned since the 1929 riots but the AEC refused to call it off. On 13 October after mid-day prayers in Jerusalem a demonstration faced a contingent of unarmed police determined to break it up. Stones were thrown and baton charges were made, including one against a crowd of Muslim women. Five police and six demonstrators were injured.

The AEC considered the Jerusalem demonstration to be a success and decided to hold another in Jaffa on 27 October. After conferring with the High Commissioner, the District Commissioner informed the AEC that a long march would not be allowed and offered instead to accept a delegation. This offer was refused and the demonstration went ahead. Both the police and the demonstrators were confused about the route that the march would take. Some of the demonstrators were carrying sticks and iron bars. They faced a cordon of 100 unarmed police, many of them mounted. In the subsequent battle, two police were stabbed in the back and seriously wounded. At this point, the officer Faraday in charge brought in 15 armed police who had been held out of sight and multiple volleys were fired. On one occasion, the police "found it necessary" to fire into a cafe from which they were being attacked. In total, almost 150 shots were fired, killing 15 demonstrators and injuring 39. One Arab policeman died when heavy blocks were dropped on him. A six-year-old boy was killed by a stray bullet that passed through a tin fence.

News of the Jaffa events reached Haifa in the evening. A crowd began to pelt police with stones, who responded with batons and live fire. This continued at a higher pitch the following morning. In total, four rioters were shot dead and 10 wounded, while 16 police were injured. Haifa saw the only attack on Jews during the October events: the driver and passengers of a Jewish lorry were injured but rescued by other Arabs. There was also a small riot in Nablus on the 27th in which one demonstrator was killed by police fire. Three separate spontaneous incidents in Jerusalem during the next two days produced no serious casualties.

The total casualties during these events were: 1 policeman killed and 56 injured, 26 members of the public killed and 187 injured. As mentioned, the policeman was killed by a large stone; the public killed were all the result of gunshots. Contingents of the British military were on stand-by during the riots but did not see action.

Fifteen leaders of the unrest were sentenced to long prison terms, but on appeal were released on good behaviour bonds. Unlike in previous cases of serious unrest, the riots did not lead to a suspension of Jewish immigration.

A Commission of Inquiry was formed to examine the events, though its terms of reference were carefully crafted to prevent it from investigating government policy. The Attorney-General of Palestine Harry Trusted and the former Chief Justice of the Straits Settlements Sir James William Murison submitted their report in the following year. Opining that "an Arab crowd in Palestine is mercurial and excitable and when excited, dangerous", the report exonerated the police behaviour in all respects.

== Aftermath ==
The 1933 Palestine riots were a prelude to the 1936–1939 Arab revolt in Palestine, during which the Arab community of Mandatory Palestine, supported by foreign Arab volunteers, held a mass revolt against the British authorities, also targeting the Palestinian Jewish community.

== See also ==
- 1920 Palestine riots
- Anti-Zionism
- Arab nationalism
- Mohammad Amin al-Husayni
- Palestinian nationalism
