= Herzi Halevi =

Chief of General Staff of the Israeli Defense Forces (born 1967)

- הרצל הלוי
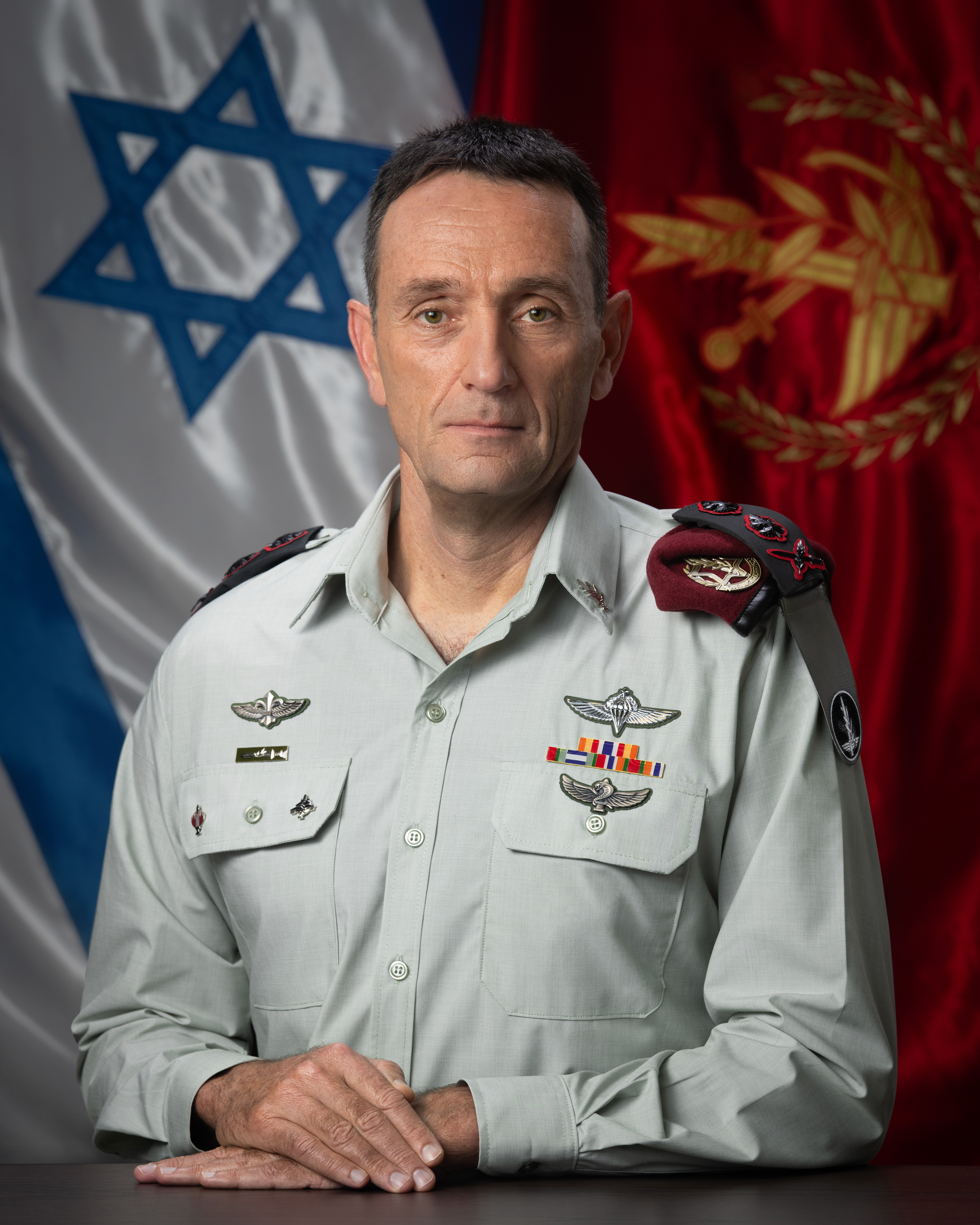
- Halevi in 2023
- Born: Herzl Halevi; 17 December 1967 (age 58); Jerusalem
- Education: Hebrew University of Jerusalem (BA); National Defense University (MA)
- Spouse: Sharon
- Children: 4
- Military career
- Allegiance: Israel
- Branch: Israel Defense Forces
- Service years: 1985–2025
- Rank: Rav Aluf (Chief of Staff; highest rank)
- Unit: Paratroopers Brigade
- Commands: Unit 269 – Sayeret Matkal; 35th Paratroopers Brigade; 91st Territorial Division; Military Intelligence Directorate; Southern Command; Chief of the General Staff
- Conflicts: Arab–Israeli conflict; Israeli–Lebanese conflict; South Lebanon conflict; 2006 Lebanon War; 2024 Israeli invasion of Lebanon; Israeli–Palestinian conflict; First Intifada; Second Intifada; 2021 Israel–Palestine crisis; Gaza–Israel conflict; Gaza War (2008-2009); 2012 Gaza War; 2014 Gaza War; Gaza war; Israeli invasion of Syria (2024–present); April 2024 Iranian strikes against Israel

Herzl "Herzi" Halevi (Hebrew: הרצל "הרצי" הלוי; born 17 December 1967) is a retired Israeli general who served as the Chief of the General Staff of the Israel Defense Forces from 16 January 2023 to 5 March 2025.

He previously served as the commander of the Israeli Southern Command, the chief of the Military Intelligence Directorate, the commander of the 91st (Territorial) Division, the commander of the 35th Paratroopers Brigade, and the commander of the Sayeret Matkal. Halevi was the first practicing Orthodox Jew to serve as the head of Israeli military intelligence.

== Early life and education ==
Herzl Halevi was born in Jerusalem. His father Shlomo was the son of Haim Shalom Halevi (Gordin), a member of the Irgun and the "Battalion of the Defenders of the Language", and Tzila, the daughter of Rabbi Dov-Ber HaCohen Kook and niece of Rabbi Abraham Isaac HaCohen Kook, the chief rabbi of Israel. He was named after his uncle who died in the battle for Jerusalem in the Six-Day War several months before his birth. Halevi's mother's family lived in Jerusalem for 14 generations, while his father's parents immigrated from Russia.

Halevi studied at Himmelfarb High School and was a member of the Tzofim religious scouts.

He holds a bachelor's degree in philosophy and business management from the Hebrew University of Jerusalem and a master's degree in international resource management from National Defense University in Washington, D.C., United States.

His brother, Amir Halevi, is the former Director General of the Israeli Ministry of Tourism.

== Military career ==
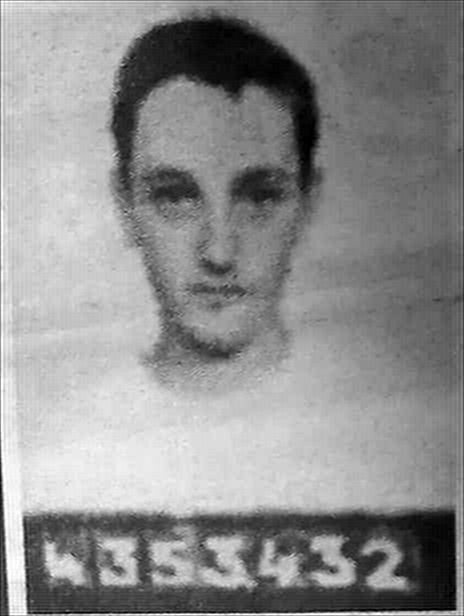
Halevi enlisting in the army, 1985

Halevi was drafted into the Israel Defense Forces (IDF) in 1985. He volunteered as a paratrooper in the Paratroopers Brigade. He served as a soldier and squad leader. In 1987, he became an infantry officer after completing an officer candidate school and returned to the Paratroopers Brigade as a platoon leader. Halevi led the brigade's anti-tank company in counter-guerrilla operations during the South Lebanon conflict. In 1993, he was assigned to Sayeret Matkal, the IDF's special forces unit, where he served as a company commander. Halevi later commanded the unit during the Second Intifada.

=== Colonel ===
On 11 September 2005, he was appointed commander of the Menashe Regional Brigade and on 22 August 2007, he was appointed commander of the Paratroopers Brigade and led it during 2008–2009 Gaza War and numerous other operations.

=== Brigadier general ===
In September 2009, Halevi was promoted to the rank of brigadier general (Tat-Aluf) and appointed commander of the Operational Division in the Military Intelligence Directorate and served in that position until 11 October 2011. On 6 November 2011, he was appointed as the commander of the 91st Division. In December 2012, the division won the "Chief of Staff's award for outstanding units" under his lead. He finished his role there in November 2013 and in 2014 became the commander of the IDF Command and Staff College.

=== Major general ===
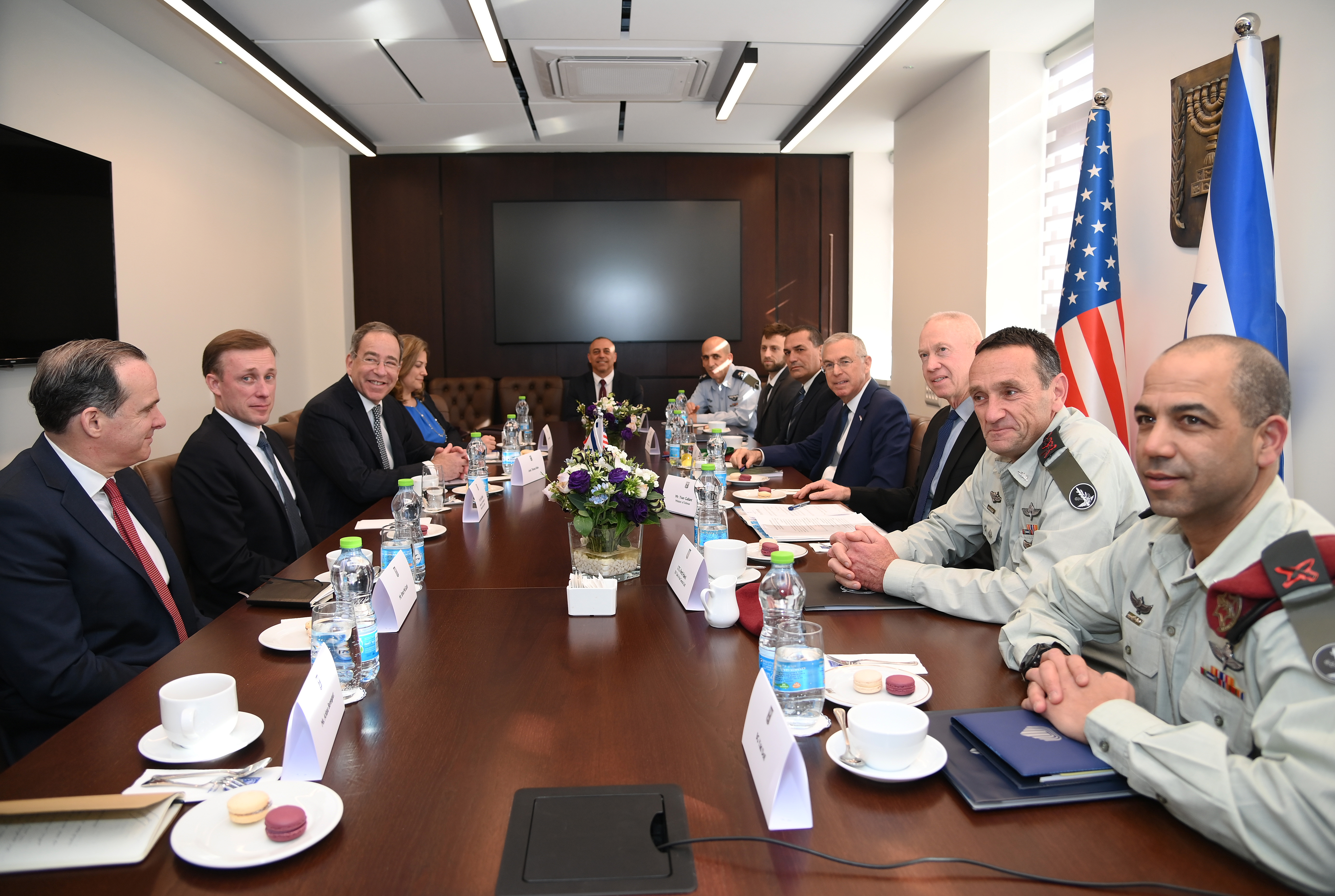
Halevi (2nd from r.) with Defense Minister Yoav Gallant (3rd from r.) meet U.S. National Security Adviser Jake Sullivan (2nd from l.), in January 2023

In September 2014, he was promoted to the rank of Major General (Aluf) and appointed chief of the Israeli Military Intelligence Directorate and served in that capacity until March 2018. In this position, he increased IDF cooperation with the Mossad and the Shin Bet, including the signing of a memorandum of understanding between the IDF and the Shin Bet that ended a long-standing dispute between the organizations over the sharing of intelligence and the allocation of resources. On 6 June 2018, Halevi became the commander of Israel's Southern Command, overseeing the IDF's activity around the Gaza Strip. Halevi commanded the IDF's Southern Command forces during the November 2019 Gaza–Israel clashes, when it fought against Palestinian Islamic Jihad (PIJ), following the targeted killing of senior PIJ commander, Baha Abu al-Ata, in Gaza.

=== Lieutenant general ===
On 11 July 2021, he was appointed the deputy chief of staff. Halevi was nominated as the incoming chief of staff by the defense minister, Benny Gantz, on 4 September 2022. The 36th Israeli government confirmed his appointment as the next Chief of Staff on 23 October 2022. He became the 23rd Chief of Staff on 16 January 2023 replacing outgoing Chief from Aviv Kohavi. He commanded the IDF during the current Gaza war.

On 12 September 2024, The Times of Israel reported that Halevi was "making preparations" to step down as Chief of Staff in December 2024. On 21 January 2025, he told Defense Minister Israel Katz that he intended to resign as Chief of Staff on 6 March and took responsibility for the IDF's failures during the October 7 attacks. Halevi formally resigned on March 5 and was succeeded by Eyal Zamir.

== Awards and decorations ==
Herzi Halevi was awarded three campaign ribbons for his service during three wars.

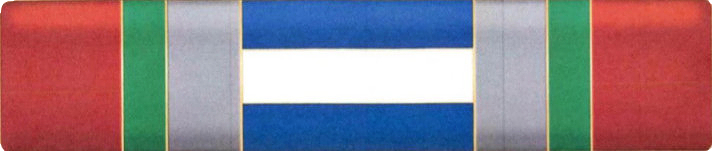

| 2006 Lebanon War | South Lebanon conflict (1985–2000) | 2014 Gaza War |

== Personal life ==
Halevi resides in Kfar HaOranim, an Israeli settlement in the West Bank. He is married to Sharon and has four children. He grew up religious and still attends synagogue on the Sabbath.
