= Tayseer al-Jabari =

Palestinian militant (1972–2022)

Tayseer Mahmoud al-Jabari
- Native name: تيسير محمود الجعبري
- Nickname: Abu Mahmoud (kunya)
- Born: 18 January 1972
- Died: 5 August 2022
- Cause of death: Assassination by Israeli airstrike
- Conflicts: Gaza-Israel conflict: 2012; 2014; May 2019; November 2019; 2021
- Alma mater: Islamic University of Gaza

Tayseer Mahmoud al-Jabari (Arabic:تيسير محمود الجعبري; January 18, 1972 – August 5, 2022) was a Palestinian militant and senior commander of the al-Quds Brigades, the military wing of the Palestinian Islamic Jihad (PIJ) movement. He succeeded Baha Abu al-Ata as the brigades' commander in the northern Gaza Strip, holding that position from the former's assassination in 2019 until his own assassination in 2022, which sparked the 2022 Gaza–Israel clashes.

== Early life ==
Tayseer Mahmoud al-Jabari was born on 18 January 1972. His family, the al-Jabari family, is also the family of assassinated al-Qassam Brigades leader Ahmed Jabari. His family lives in the Shuja'iyya neighborhood in the Gaza Strip.

== In the PIJ ==
According to Al Jazeera, Al-Jabari joined the PIJ in his childhood, and was a leader in the "Islamic League," the student wing of the PIJ. He graduated from the Islamic University of Gaza, specializing in the Shari'a, or Islamic Law.

=== Oslo Years ===
Al-Jabari is described as a founder of the Al-Quds Brigades, the military wing of the PIJ. He was an opponent of signing the Oslo accords, and was arrested several times by Palestinian Security Services in the years following the signing of the agreement.

=== Second Intifada ===
Al-Jabari was a leader in the al-Quds Brigades during the Second Intifada, also known as Al-Aqsa Intifada, and was responsible for multiple attacks on Israeli targets, including civilians.

=== Assassination attempts ===
Al-Jabari was a leader in the al-Quds brigades during the Gaza–Israel conflict. He was a target in two assassination attempts by the Israeli Military in the clashes of 2012 and 2014.

=== Commander in the Northern Gaza Strip ===
Al-Jabari was an assistant to Baha Abu al-Ata, the commander of the al-Quds Brigades in the Northern region of the Gaza strip. He replaced Abu al-Ata after he was killed by Israeli forces in November 2019.

==== 2021 Gaza-Israel clashes ====
In the 11-day Gaza-Israel clashes in 2021, al-Jabari was responsible for launching hundreds of rockets toward Israeli territory, according to the Israel Defense Forces (IDF). During that conflict, a PIJ cell led by him targeted an Israeli car traveling near the Gaza border, wounding one.

== Assassination ==
A video showing the targeted killing of Tayseer al-Jabari.

On 5 August 2022, Israel launched a military operation against the PIJ in the Gaza strip, which commenced with an airstrike that killed Tayseer al-Jabari. An Israeli military spokesman said that the attack came following the detection "threatening movements by militant forces."

The assassination of al-Jabari led to clashes that lasted for 66 hours and ended in a ceasefire. During the clashes, the PIJ targeted several Israeli cities, including Tel Aviv and Ashkelon.
