= Yacov Bengo =

IDF military personnel

- יעקב בנג'ו
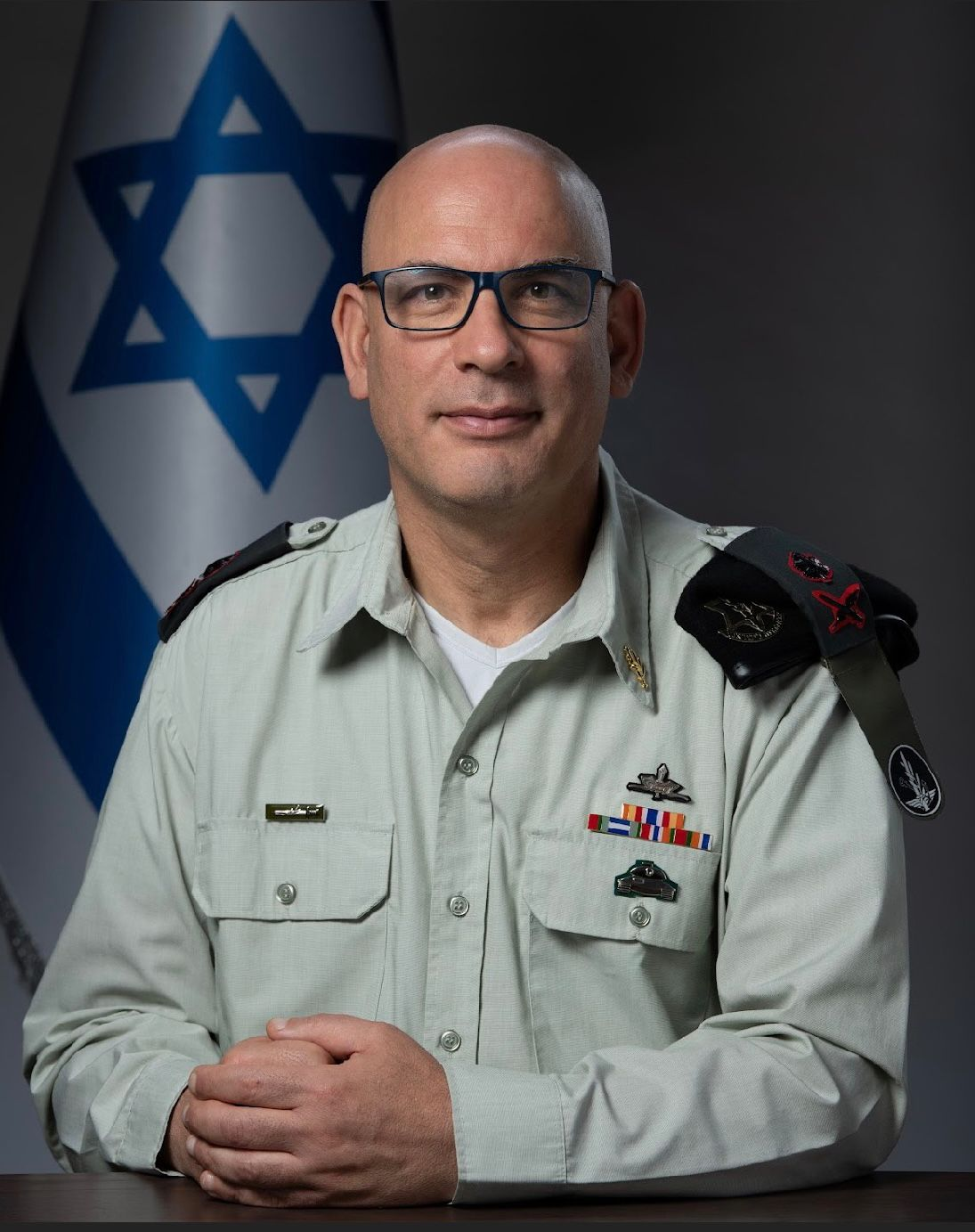
- Bengo in 2023
- Born: July 1971 (age 55)
- Education: Hebrew University of Jerusalem; Bar-Ilan University
- Military career
- Allegiance: Israel
- Branch: Israel Defense Forces
- Service years: 1/11/1989–1/8/2023
- Rank: Aluf (Major General)
- Commands: Commander of palsar 7; 75th "Romach"/"Lance" Armor Battalion; Commander of the Dekel Battalion; Commander of the Fires Training Center at the National Training Center; Head of the Land Branch (in the J8 Directorate); Commander of the 14th Armored Brigade (res); Commander of the 7th Armored Brigade (Israel); Head of the Operations department (in the J3 Directorate); Commander of the 146th Division (Israel) (res); Commander of the 36th Division (Israel); Head of the IDF Doctrine and Training Division (J7); Commander of the Northern Corps; Commander General of the Multi-Domain Joint Maneuver Array in the Ground Forces
- Conflicts: First Intifada; Second Intifada; 2006 Lebanon War; Operation Summer Rains; Operation Cast Lead; Operation Pillar of Defense; Operation Protective Edge; Operation Black Belt
- Awards: Selective Service System Service Medal

Yacov Bengo (Hebrew: יעקב בנג'ו; born July 1971) is a retired Israeli general who served as the head of the IDF's planning directorate (J8), the commander of the northern core, and held key positions including head of the Doctrine and Training Division (J7), commander of the 36th division, and commander of the 7th brigade. As of August 1, 2023, Bengo is in the private sector.

== Biography ==
With his recruitment to the IDF, Bengo conscripted in the Armored Corps in the 211th Brigade. He went through Advanced combat training and Tank commander training. He later completed the officer's course and became the commander for an armor platoon, after which he continued to serve in several command roles, amongst which were: Company commander in the 82nd Armor Battalion between 1993 and 1995, Commander of Palsar 7 between 1995 and 1997, Vice commander of the 75th Armor Battalion 1997–1998, and as commander of the 75th Armor Battalion between 2001 and 2003.

He later served as Instructor at the IDF Officers training School (B.H.D 1) until 2004, then as Instructor at the Tactical Command College (IDNC) until 2005.

He served as the head of the land branch in the IDF Planning Directorate until 2007.

In 2007 he was appointed as the commander of the 14th Armored Brigade, and as the head for the center of live fire training, serving both roles simultaneously until 2009, when he became the commander of the 7th Armored Brigade. leaving that role In 2011 to become Head of the IDF Operations Department (J33)

In 2013 he was promoted to Tat Aluf (brigadier general) and appointed as the commander of the 146th armored Division, then on 2015 he was appointed as the commander for 36th armored Division until the 18th of march 2018. later in the same year he became the Head of the IDF Doctrine and Training Division (J7).

In September 2019 he was promoted to the rank of Aluf and appointed as the commander of the northern core, while still simultaneously serving as the head of the Doctrine and Instructions division. Then in August 2020 he was also appointed as the commander for the multidimensional maneuvering command in the Ground Forces.

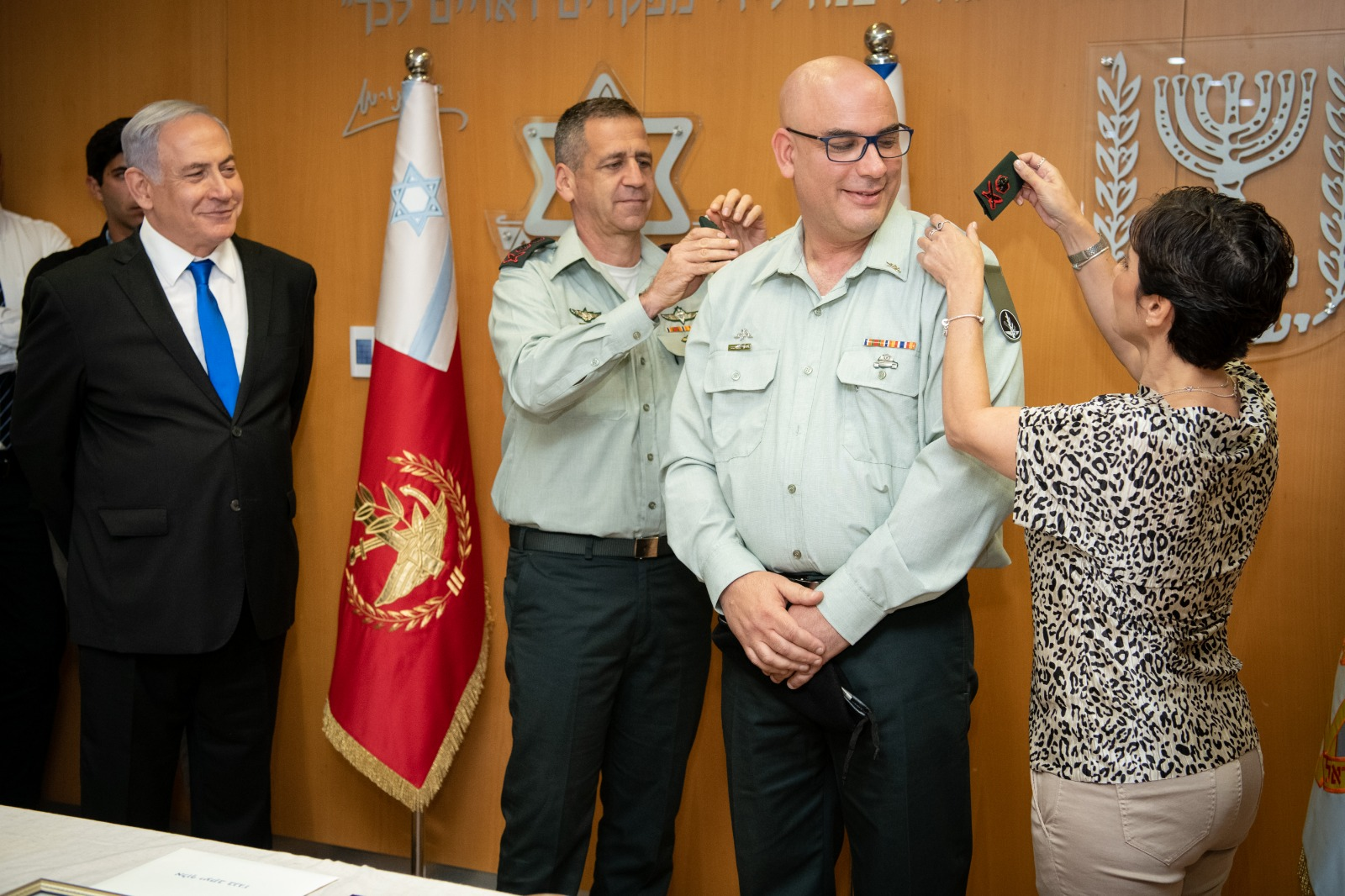
Bengo receiving the rank of major general from Aviv Kochavi, with his wife at his side. September 2019

In 2019 Bengo co-Published a book called "Operational Focus: an Approach to Describe, Plan, and Manage in Contemporary Military Operations" with Matania Tzachi, which presents a force application and build-up model in the strategic level. The book followed a series of articles he penned a couple years earlier.

In January 2022 he was appointed the IDF's planning directorate (J8), and served in this position until August 2023.

In 2024 he joined the Begin–Sadat Center for Strategic Studies as a researcher.

== Education and personal life ==
Bengo has a bachelor's degree and master's degree in political science from The Hebrew University, with his M.A. thesis being on the subject of "Nationalism and the nomadic paradigm A new way of analyzing an old phenomenon".

In June 2021 Bengo received his Ph.D. in general history from Bar-Ilan University for his thesis, which he did in the department of General History, with Dr Tal Tovy as his doctoral advisor, on the subject of: "The hidden methodology of the general theory of war".

Bengo is married and a father to two children.

== Books ==
Yacov Bengo, Cracking the Code: War’s Hidden Methodology, Maxwell Air Force Base: Air University Press, 2023, ISBN 978-1-58566-329-3.

Yacov Bengo and Zahi Matnya, The Operational Focus Approach [Hamikud Hamivzai: Hebrew], Israel, Modan, 2019.
