= Aviv Kohavi =

22nd Chief of Staff of the Israeli Defense Forces

- אביב כוכבי
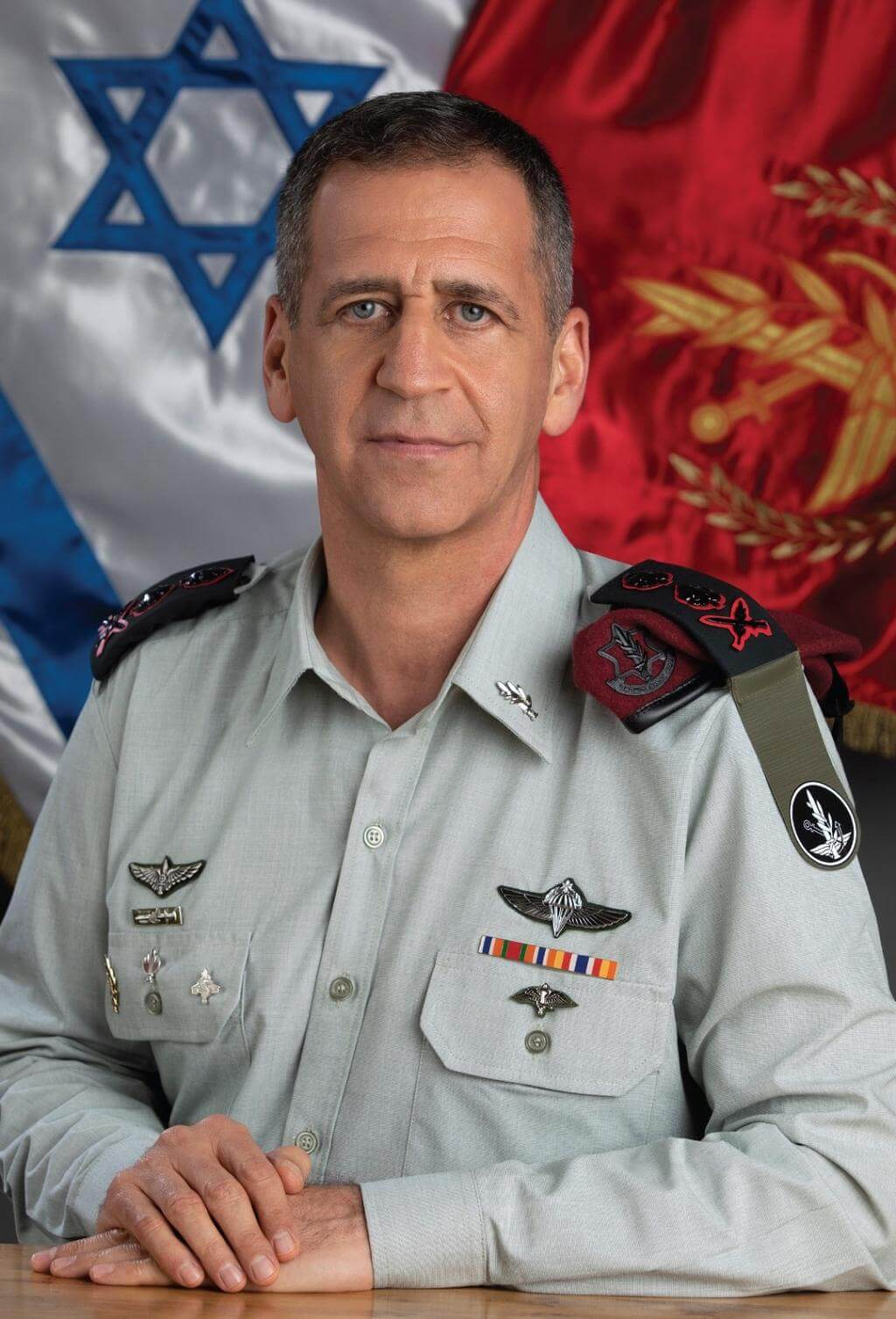
- Kohavi in 2019
- Born: 23 April 1964 (age 62); Kiryat Bialik, Israel
- Education: Bahad 1 Hebrew University of Jerusalem; Harvard University; Johns Hopkins University
- Military career
- Allegiance: Israel
- Branch: Israel Defense Forces
- Service years: 1982–2023
- Rank: Rav Aluf
- Commands: 101st "Peten" (Elapidae) paratroop battalion; 98th Paratroopers Division; 143rd (Territorial) Division; Operations Division of the IDF's Operations Directorate; Israeli Military Intelligence Directorate; Northern Command; Deputy Chief of General Staff; Chief of the General Staff
- Conflicts: First Lebanon War; Security Zone in Lebanon; First Intifada; Second Intifada; 2006 Lebanon War; Operation Summer Rains; Operation Cast Lead; Operation Pillar of Defense; Operation Protective Edge; Operation Black Belt; Operation Guardian of the Walls; Operation Breaking Dawn

Aviv Kohavi (Hebrew: אביב כוכבי; born 23 April 1964) is an Israeli former general who served as the 22nd Chief of General Staff of the Israel Defense Forces from 15 January 2019 to 16 January 2023. Before becoming Lieutenant General (Rav-Aluf), he was commander of the Gaza Division, commander of the Northern Command, commander of the Paratroopers Brigade and Military Intelligence Directorate.

== Early life and education ==
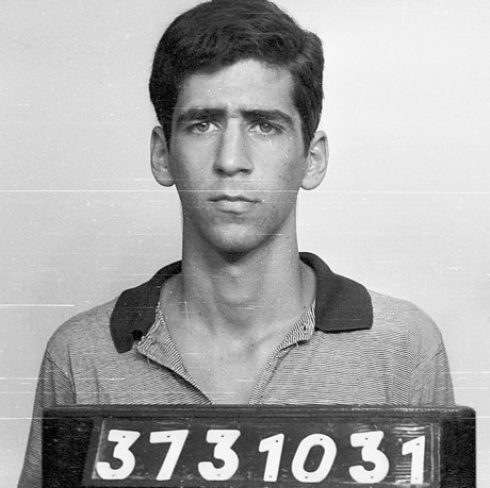
Kohavi enlisting in the army, 1982

Kohavi was one of three children born to Shaul and Riva Kohavi. His father was a shop owner and his mother was a physical education teacher. His maternal grandfather and some of his brothers immigrated to Israel from Russia before World War II. His paternal grandfather's family lived in Kraków, Poland. His grandfather, Romek-Abraham, immigrated to Israel in the 1920s, and was one of the pioneers of Highway 75 and one of the founders of Kiryat Haim.

He grew up in Kiryat Bialik in the Haifa District, and was a member of the HaMahanot HaOlim Labour Zionist youth movement. He studied at the Habonim school and ORT Kiryat Bialik school.

Kohavi has a bachelor's degree in philosophy from the Hebrew University of Jerusalem, a master's degree in public administration from Harvard University and a master's degree in international relations from Johns Hopkins University.

== Military career ==
Kohavi was drafted into the IDF in 1982. He volunteered as a paratrooper in the Paratroopers Brigade and was placed in the 890th Battalion. He served as a soldier and a squad leader. In 1985 he became an infantry officer after completing Officer Candidate School and returned to the Paratroopers Brigade as a platoon leader. During his career Kohavi led the Brigade's Anti-tank company.

Between 1993 and 1994, he led the 101st "Peten" (Elapidae) paratroop battalion in counter-guerrilla operations in South Lebanon. Afterwards he commanded a Regional Brigade in South Lebanon and a reserve Paratrooper Brigade. Later he commanded the training base of the brigade, was deputy commander of the brigade and commander of the reservist paratrooper 551 brigade.

=== Commander of the Paratroopers Brigade ===
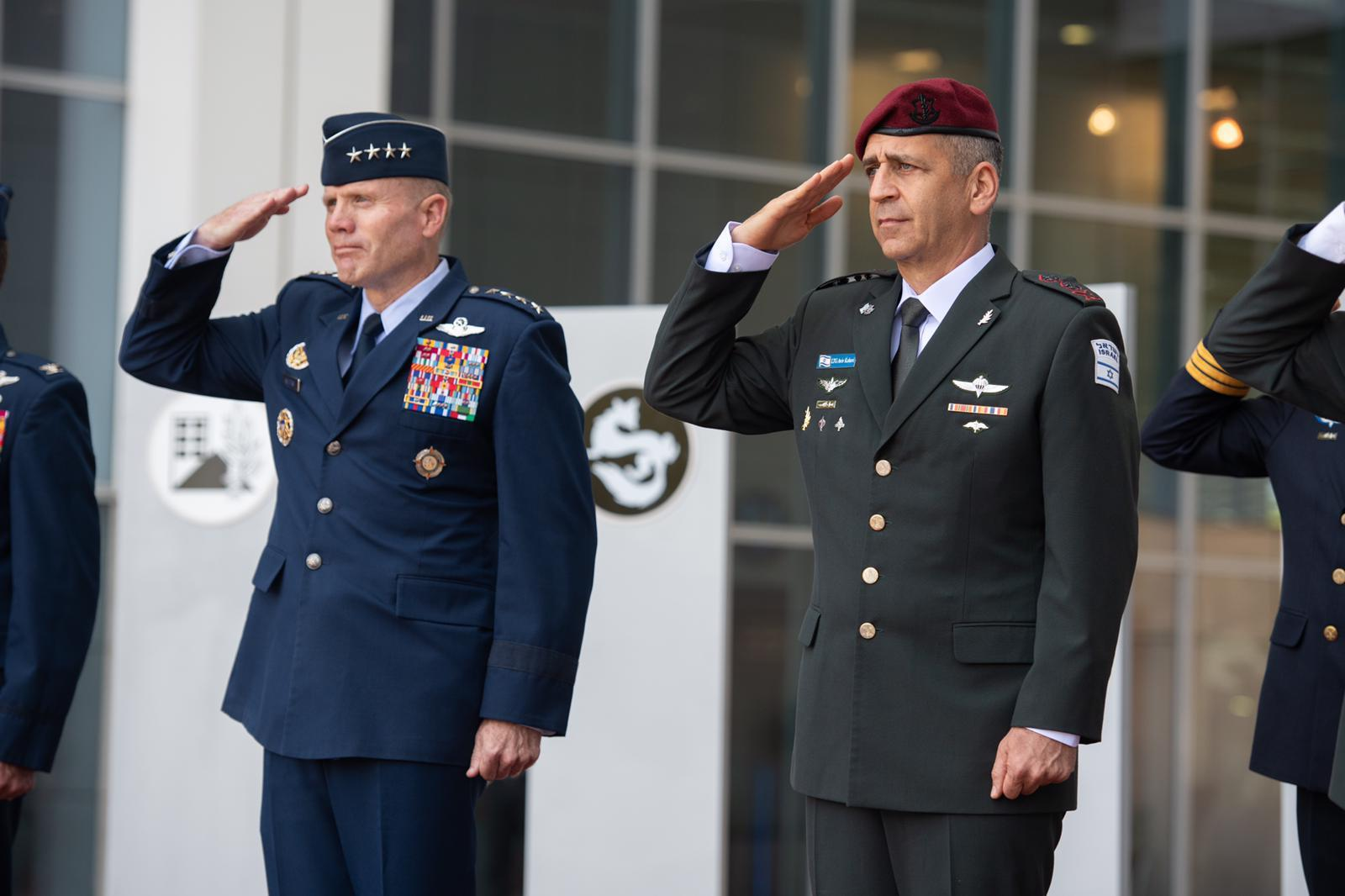
Lt. Gen. Aviv Kohavi with Supreme Allied Commander Europe Gen. Tod D. Wolters.

In 2001, Kohavi was appointed commander of the Paratroopers Brigade, a position he held until 2003. Together with a group of other commanders from the field units, including Moshe Tamir, Yair Golan, Gal Hirsch and Noam Tibon, he was one of the pushers to act against the sources of Palestinian militancy during the Second Intifada in the kasbahs and refugee camps, despite being crowded and complicated urban areas, and despite the hesitations of the IDF senior command. He successfully led the brigade in a takeover of the Balata refugee camp in Nablus in February 2002.

He then led the brigade in Operation Defensive Shield, and in other operations throughout the West Bank against Palestinian militant infrastructure, among them, the conquest of Bethlehem and the imposition of a siege on the Church of the Nativity, in which fifty armed wanted men fortified themselves, held about 200 hostages and waged gun battles against the IDF.

In 2002 during the Second Intifada while on the battlefield, Kohavi developed the use of a 5 kg hammer to break down walls and cross through homes in refugee camps to prevent his soldiers from being shot by snipers. This tactic has been copied by other armies, including the United States military.

=== Brigadier general roles ===
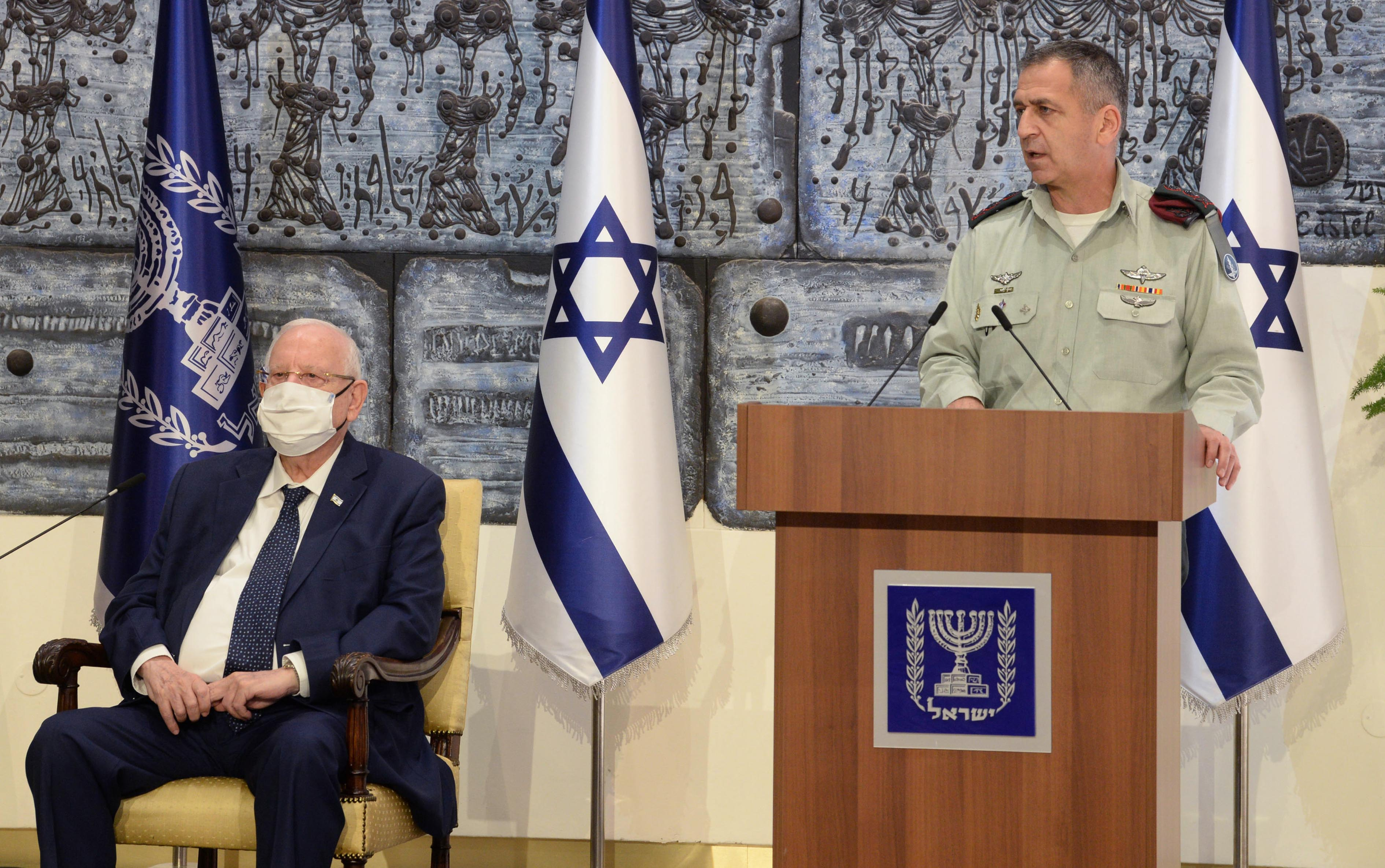
Kohavi with President Reuven Rivlin in 2020, to mark the anniversary of Atidim. In the background is an Israeli relief made of basalt ash.

In 2003, Kohavi was promoted to the rank of brigadier general and appointed commander of the 98th Paratroopers Division, and served until November 2004. On 30 November 2004, he was appointed commander of the Gaza Division, and led the division in operations against Qassam rocket launches and Palestinian militants infrastructure in the Gaza Strip, including Operation Summer Rains. During his service as division commander, two significant events occurred: the disengagement plan in September 2005 and the abduction of Gilad Shalit in June 2006.

In 2007, he was appointed head of the Operations Division of the IDF's Operations Directorate, a position he held until January 2010, during which time he participated in the planning of Operation Cast Lead. After that, he served as a project manager in the Planning Directorate.

=== Major general roles ===
Kohavi received the role of the chief of the Israeli Military Intelligence Directorate on 22 November 2010. During his tenure, he took part in the planning of Operation Pillar of Defense, Operation Full Disclosure, Operation Brother's Keeper and Operation Protective Edge.

In November 2014 he was appointed as the commander of the Northern Command. During his tenure, the barrier against Hezbollah on the border with Lebanon was built, at the same time the command forces conducted activities to thwart militant infrastructure from Syrian territory, along with promoting a good neighborhood project called Operation Good Neighbor on the Syrian border.

On 11 May 2017, he was appointed as Deputy Chief of the General Staff of the Israel Defense Forces. He served in this position until 13 December 2018.

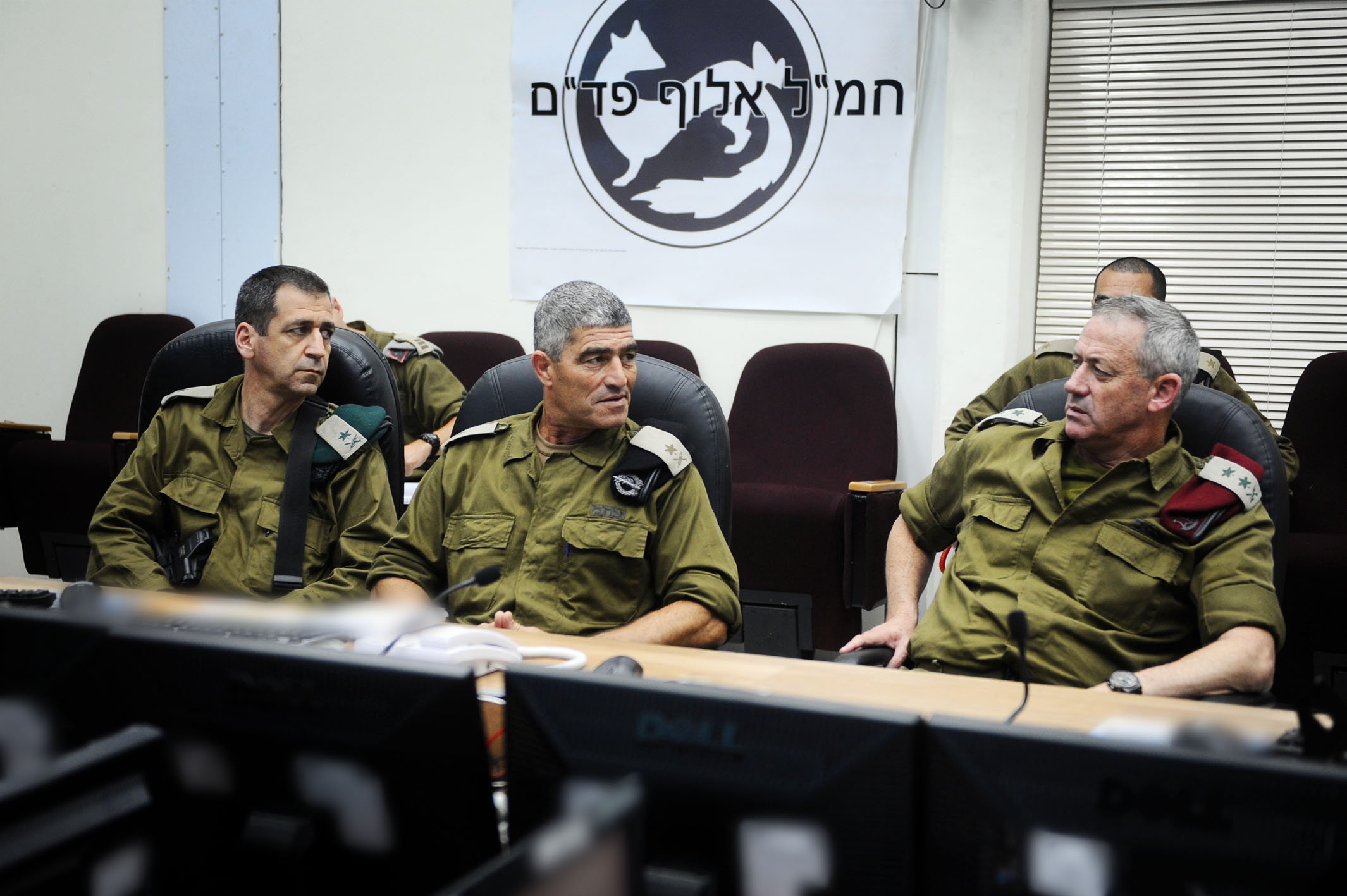
From right to left: Chief of Staff Benny Gantz, Commander of the Southern Command Tal Russo, and Chief of the Israeli Military Intelligence Directorate Aviv Kohavi

=== Chief of the General Staff ===
On 26 October 2018, Defense Minister Avigdor Lieberman recommended Kohavi's appointment as the 22nd IDF Chief of Staff, with the consent of Prime Minister Benjamin Netanyahu. On 25 November, the government approved his appointment. On 15 January 2019, he was promoted to the rank of Lieutenant General and began his service as Chief of Staff.

In November 2019 Kohavi commanded the IDF in Operation Black Belt, when it fought against the Palestinian Islamic Jihad (PIJ), following the targeted killing of senior PIJ commander Baha Abu al-Ata in Gaza. He also led Israel's military during Operation Guardian of the Walls in May 2021.

Later in May, Defense Minister Benny Gantz announced that he will request from the government to approve extending his tenure as IDF Chief of Staff by an additional year. In July, the government approved the extension of term. In August 2022, Kohavi led Israeli forces during Operation Breaking Dawn. On 16 January 2023, Kohavi handed over his role to Herzi Halevi and officially finished his active military service.

== Personal life ==
Kohavi is vegetarian, is married and is the father of three daughters. He lives in Adi in northern Israel.

Kohavi's brother is Zohar Kohavi, Head of Research at the left-wing "think tank" Zulat for Equality and Human Rights Institute.

== Awards and decorations ==
Aviv Kohavi was awarded three campaign ribbons for his service during three conflicts.

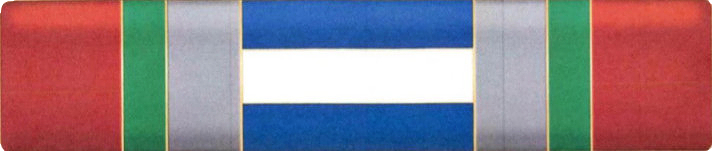

Second Lebanon War	South Lebanon Security Zone	Operation Protective Edge
