= Akram al-Ajouri =

Palestinian militant leader

- Born: Gaza
- Military career
- Allegiance: Islamic Jihad Movement in Palestine (PIJ)

Akram al-Ajouri (Arabic: أكرم العجوري) is a leader of Islamic Jihad Movement in Palestine (PIJ). Al-Ajouri is based in Damascus and was unsuccessfully targeted in an Israeli Defence Forces (IDF) airstrike on November 12, 2019, on the same day the IDF killed Baha Abu al-Ata. The IDF described al-Ajouri as a member of the PIJ's political bureau in Syria. However, the airstrike on a building in Mezzeh area killed his son and daughter, and six were injured. Clashes began between Gaza and Israel following his attempted killing and the killing of al-Ata. As of 14 November 2023, al-Ajouri is designated as a terrorist by the United States State Department.

== Military career ==
Since joining Jihad, Akram al-Ajouri has gradually risen through the ranks, initially holding ordinary positions before moving on to important positions, including being elected to the movement's political bureau abroad in late September 2018, as well as being a member of the movement's Shura Council and playing a role in financing and arming the movement.

According to Israeli media, Tel Aviv holds Akram al-Ajouri “fully responsible” for the periodic rocket fire from the Gaza Strip on settlements around the Strip, and links him to the Iranian regime, accusing him of having “distinguished and strong relations” with Quds Force commander Qassem Soleimani and Lebanese Hezbollah Secretary-General Hassan Nasrallah.

== Assassination attempts ==
After emerging as one of the most important members of the Islamic Jihad movement in Palestine, Israel attempted to assassinate him on November 12, 2019, when it bombed his home in Darayya, Syria, but failed to do so; his son Moaz was killed and six others were injured, while al-Ajouri was unharmed.

On 24 February 2020 it was reported that he was targeted by an Israeli strike in Damascus, Syria.

== International Sanctions ==
As of 14 November 2023, al-Ajouri is designated as a terrorist by the United States State Department.

On 13 December 2023, he was added to UK's International Counter-Terrorism List, making subject to a travel ban and assets freeze. This action was taken by the UK Foreign Office in response to the October 7 attacks on Israel by Hamas.
