= 2022 Gaza–Israel clashes =

2022 conflict between Israel and Gaza

- Part of the Israeli–Palestinian conflict
- Targeted killing of Tayseer al-Jabari, commander in the Islamic Jihad Movement in Palestine
Date	5–7 August 2022 (2 days)
Location	Gaza Strip and West Bank
Result	Ceasefire on 23:30 (UTC+3), 7 August 2022

Combatants
Israel: Israel Defense Forces; Israeli Air Force	(Palestine) Gaza Strip: Islamic Jihad Movement in Palestine (PIJ)

Commanders and leaders
(Israel) Yair Lapid; (Israel) Benny Gantz; (Israel) Aviv Kochavi	Ziyad al-Nakhalah; Tayseer al-Jabari †; Khaled Mansour †

Casualties and losses
2 IDF soldiers wounded 21 civilians treated for anxiety, 39 for injuries sustained while rushing to shelters	49 Palestinians killed, including 17 children, 350 civilians wounded 36 civilians killed (22 by Israel, 14 by misfired Palestinian rockets)

The 2022 Gaza–Israel clashes code-named as Operation Breaking Dawn lasted from 5 to 7 August 2022. The Israel Defense Forces (IDF) conducted some 147 airstrikes in Gaza and Palestinian militants fired approximately 1,100 rockets towards Israel. The operation, ordered by Prime Minister Yair Lapid and Defense Minister Benny Gantz without prior Cabinet discussion or approval, followed a raid in Jenin in the Israeli-occupied West Bank, in which Israeli forces arrested Bassam al-Saadi, a leader of the Palestinian Islamic Jihad (PIJ) in that area. On 6 August, Israel arrested 20 people in the West Bank of whom 19 were members of PIJ and a further 20 on 7 August according to an unnamed Israeli official.

The initial attack included the targeted killing of Tayseer al-Jabari, a military leader of the group. On the second day, the PIJ commander of the Southern area of the Strip, Khaled Mansour, was also targeted and killed. Islamic Jihad stated that the Israeli bombardments were a 'declaration of war' and responded with retaliatory rocket fire towards Israel.

The clashes resulted in the death of at least 49 Palestinians, including 17 children, according to the Gaza health ministry. The IDF stated that over a dozen of these deaths, including 12 of the children, were caused by failed PIJ rocket launches. This was disputed by the father of one of the victims, while other Gaza residents and journalists state they saw the misfires by PIJ and called for an investigation of the misfires. On 13 August, Haaretz reported that misfires killed 14 civilians, including seven children. Some 20% of rockets fell short and into Gaza.

The clashes ended with a truce that was confirmed by both sides on the night of 7 August 2022.

== Background ==
Both the Islamic Jihad Movement in Palestine (PIJ) and Hamas are designated terrorist organizations by Israel, the US, and the EU. However, the PIJ has usually been overshadowed by the larger Hamas movement which administers Gaza. PIJ has been growing in strength since the 2014 Gaza War, and receives weapons and funding from Iran. It is considered by Israel as one of the "most dangerous and radical Palestinian armed groups".

PIJ has a strong presence in West Bank cities like Jenin and Nablus. During the period between March and May, attacks by Israeli Arabs and Palestinians killed 17 Israelis, most of them civilians, and two Ukrainians. As a result, the IDF increased its raids against armed Palestinian factions throughout the West Bank. By July, at least 30 Palestinians were killed, including journalist Shireen Abu Akleh and 3 of those responsible for killings in Israel. On 1 August, Israeli forces arrested the PIJ West Bank leader Bassem al-Saadi. In the aftermath of that operation, amid heightened tensions, roads were closed in the south of Israel by the Israeli-Gaza border wall and reinforcements were sent south after threats of attack were made by PIJ sources in Gaza. The same day, Israeli communities in southern Israel were placed in lockdown by the military as a security precaution against potential attacks from Gaza, as, according to Israel, the PIJ had positioned anti-tank missiles and snipers at the border to kill Israeli civilians and soldiers.

Haaretz reported on 2 August that Egyptian intelligence officials "are holding talks with the leaders of the factions in Gaza in order to prevent escalation" and that "all parties told Cairo they aren't looking for escalation." On 3 August, Khaled al-Batsh, head of the politburo of the PIJ in Gaza said: "We have every right to bomb Israel with our most advanced weapons, and make the occupier pay a heavy price. We will not settle for attacking around Gaza, but we will bomb the center of the so-called State of Israel."

The operation was ordered by Prime Minister Yair Lapid and Defense Minister Benny Gantz without prior Cabinet discussion or approval.

Early on 5 August, Tor Wennesland, the United Nations Special Coordinator for the Middle East Peace Process, reportedly visited the home of al-Saadi in Jenin and met with his family members as part of efforts to prevent an escalation between Israel and the PIJ. Later that day, Wennesland issued a statement expressing concern over the "ongoing escalation between Palestinian militants and Israel", and calling on all sides to prevent further escalation.

== Wider commentary ==
As Israel was headed for a fifth election in four years, Israel's Interim Prime Minister, Yair Lapid, was seen by some Israelis as lacking a security background. The Associated Press stated that "His political fortunes could rest on the current fighting, either gaining a boost if he can portray himself as a capable leader or take a hit from a lengthy operation as Israelis try to enjoy the last weeks of summer." Hamas has stayed on the sidelines of the conflagration. According to The Times of Israel, a decision to launch a war or military operation that is thought almost certain to trigger a war requires approval by the security cabinet. Serious questions were raised in Israel about the appropriateness of Lapid making the decision to strike Gaza without prior consultation and discussion with members of his cabinet. He obtained a go-ahead only after obtaining a legal opinion from the Attorney-General Gali Baharav-Miara, who gave a green light only after being assured that the operation would not lead to war.

== Timeline ==
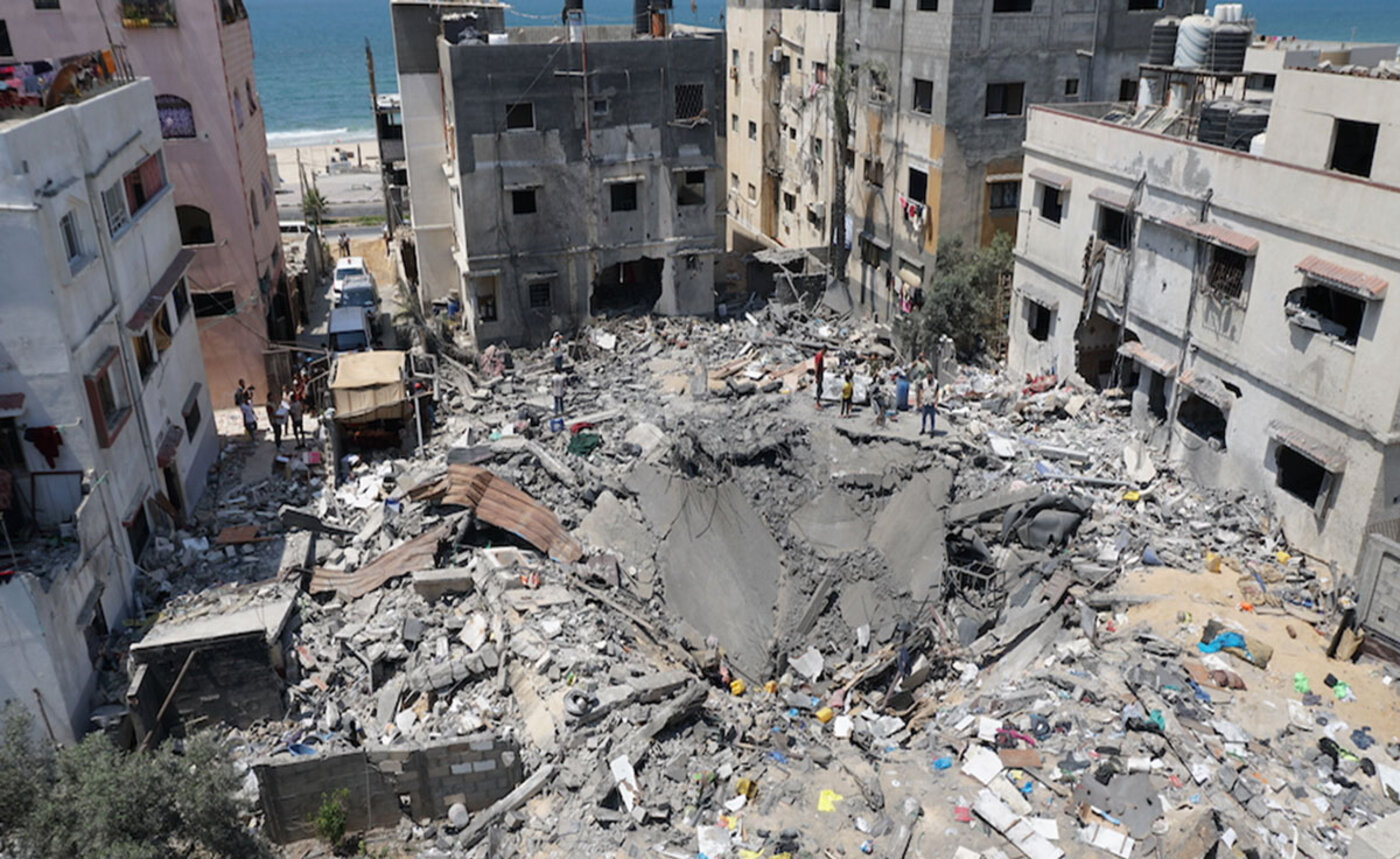
Destruction following the Israeli airstrike during the escalation in August 2022.

Israel began its attack on the Gaza Strip enclave in mid-afternoon on 5 August, with one targeting a building in the residential area where Tayseer Jabari, a PIJ military leader, lived. Palestinian medical sources said several people arrived at a hospital after Israeli raids. Among the people killed since the strikes started were four PIJ militants, a five-year-old girl and a twenty-three-year-old woman. At 9 pm, Islamic Jihad in response fired some 160 rockets towards Israel. During the early morning of 6 August, Israel arrested 20 people in the West Bank, of which 19 were Islamic Jihad members.

The operation was planned to last for one week but concluded after 66 hours. Israel characterized the airstrikes as a 'preemptive measure' to stop PIJ from taking revenge for the arrest of al-Saadi, calling it "a targeted campaign against PIJ". Middle East Eye reported that both Israeli and Palestinian analysts had called the attack 'unprovoked and strange'.

The next day, other airstrikes were launched on Gaza, killing five people, including two men in Khan Yunis and an elderly woman in Beit Hanoun who had just celebrated a wedding. The escalation continued as Israeli fighter jets dropped two bombs destroying the house of a PIJ member. Militants continued to fire rounds of rockets into Israel with no casualties reported.

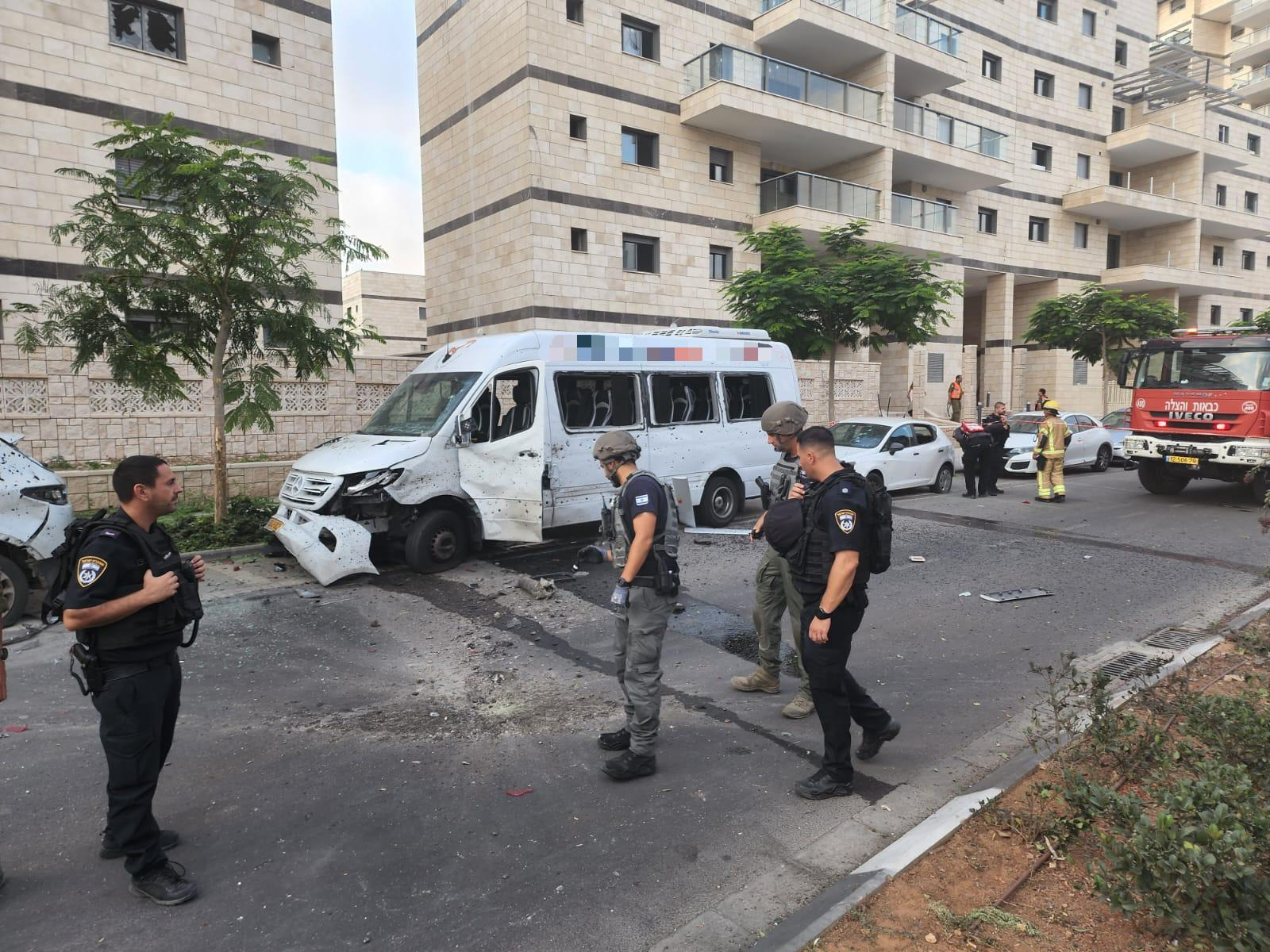
A direct hit of a Palestinian rocket in the Israeli city of Ashqelon, 6 August 2022

The Israeli Home Front Command warned civilians within a range of 80 km of Gaza to prepare for rocket fire. In response to the airstrikes, militants fired dozens of rockets into Israel, with the PIJ saying that it had fired more than a hundred. As of 6 August 2022, over 160 projectiles were fired at Israel and Israeli civilians rushed into shelters. The Barzilai Medical Center treated 13 people for injuries.

On 6 August, at least eight people, including four children, were killed by Israeli airstrikes on the Jabalia refugee camp. On that same day, two people were killed in an Israeli airstrike that targeted a residential building in the city of Rafah.

As of 7 August, UN humanitarian chief for the occupied Palestinian territories, Lynn Hastings, urged that "fuel, food, and medical supplies" be delivered to Gaza. Gaza's lone power plant is producing electricity for only a few hours per day while Gaza City's main hospital reported "acute shortages of medical supplies".

In a statement on 7 August, the PIJ confirmed the death of Khaled Mansour, its commander in the south of the Gaza Strip. That day, rockets were fired at areas in the vicinity of Jerusalem, causing no damage but signaling resolve. Sirens blared in Abu Ghosh, Mevaseret Zion and Kiryat Anavim, and an IDF spokesperson stated that rockets headed to Jerusalem were intercepted.

On 9 August, the IDF stated that the PIJ failed in its attempt to launch an Unmanned aerial vehicle towards the Tamar gas rig during the fighting.

On 10 August, the IDF said it hit 170 targets during the operation using jets, helicopters, drones, and artillery. The IDF stated the targets included 45 launching sites, 8 weapon caches, 17 observation posts, 8 military camps, 6 munition production facilities, 3 naval force targets, and 1 "attack tunnel".

== Palestinian rocket failures ==
According to the Israeli military, approximately a third of the 449 rockets fired by the Palestinians on Friday and Saturday failed to cross the boundary with Israel and fell inside Gaza.

The IDF said that "several people including children" were killed as a result of a Palestinian rocket launch failure in Jabalia, while Al Jazeera reported 4 children and the BBC multiple children dead at that location, saying that they were unable to independently verify the Israeli claim.

The Times of Israel reported on 8 August that the IDF believed PIJ "was responsible for at least 12 of the 15 deaths of children reported", 4 in Jabaliya on Saturday, 5 more also in Jabaliya and 3 others elsewhere, on Sunday, and that the military "did not produce any evidence for its claims related to the second two incidents."

On 8 August, the Associated Press reported that missiles fired by militants in Gaza that fell short may have resulted over a dozen Palestinian deaths. AP reporters examined the two explosions sites in Jabaliya that resulted in twelve fatalities, and found support for the claim that they were misfires. On 10 August, Al Jazeera reported that the father of one of the victims denied the Israeli claim in respect of the first Jabaliya incident and that Israel was still investigating the second. Subsequently, the IDF admitted responsibility for the second Jabaliya incident that killed 5 children. On 13 August, Haaretz reported that misfires killed 14 civilians, including seven children.

On 24 August, Al-Monitor published that the PIJ killed 15 Gazan civilians. The Al-Monitor journalist spoke with residents and journalist in Gaza. A journalist said he saw with his own eyes the local missile fall on the massacre in the Jabalia camp. A nearby resident told Al-Monitor that "Everyone knows that the missile that fell on Saturday was a local missile, but no one dares talk about it". Palestinians on social media said PIJ rockets were faulty and old. Those interviewed called for an investigation into the PIJ missile strikes that killed civilians in Gaza.

According to Tor Wennesland, the United Nations Special Coordinator for the Middle East Peace Process, Palestinian militants fired around 1,100 rockets of which "some 20 percent" fell within the borders of the Gaza strip. According to the IDF, it intercepts rockets headed towards Israeli populated areas with a 97% success rate using Iron Dome.

On 9 August, the Hamas Interior ministry, issued sweeping restrictions on journalists in Gaza forbidding the reporting of misfires killing Palestinians and instructing journalists to blame Israel. Following discussions with the Foreign Press Association, the restrictions were officially reversed by Salama Marouf, director of the government media office in Gaza. However, despite being reversed, they signal Hamas' expectations on media coverage and "could have a chilling effect on critical coverage" in Gaza .

== Diplomacy ==
Egypt was reported as mediating between the sides. Egyptian media reported it was preparing to host the PIJ in Cairo on 6 August 2022. Following Egyptian mediation, a ceasefire effective from 22:00 (1900 GMT) on 7 August was agreed according to Egyptian and Palestinian sources, although Israel and the PIJ did not officially confirm this.

A UN Security Council meeting was requested by the UAE, China, France, Ireland and Norway. The security council met on 8 August, after the ceasefire, but not statement was expected to be issued after the closed-door meeting. A report to the UNSC on 8 August by Wennesland confirmed that "a ceasefire had been agreed and would come into effect at 11:30 pm on 7 August. The ceasefire remains in place as I speak." and concluded "Ultimately, the underlying drivers of this and previous escalations remain. These cycles of violence will only cease when we achieve a political resolution of the conflict that brings an end to the occupation and the realization of a two-State solution on the basis of the 1967 lines, in line with UN resolutions, international law and previous agreements. I reiterate my call to the Israeli and Palestinian leadership, along with the international community, to strengthen diplomatic efforts to return to meaningful negotiations towards a viable two-State solution."

US President Joe Biden and the European Union welcomed the ceasefire and called for an investigation into civilian casualties. UN chief António Guterres also welcomed the ceasefire and reaffirmed the UN's commitment to the achievement of a two-state solution based on relevant United Nations resolutions.

== Possible war crimes ==
On 25 October 2022, Amnesty International called for an International Criminal Court probe into possible war crimes committed by both sides. The report focused mainly the Jabalia attack that killed 7 civilians as the likely result of a rocket misfire and the killing of 5 children at a cemetery likely to have been carried out by "an Israeli guided missile fired by a drone".

== See also ==
- Timeline of the Israeli–Palestinian conflict in 2022
