= Zulat for Equality and Human Rights =

Israeli non-profit research institute

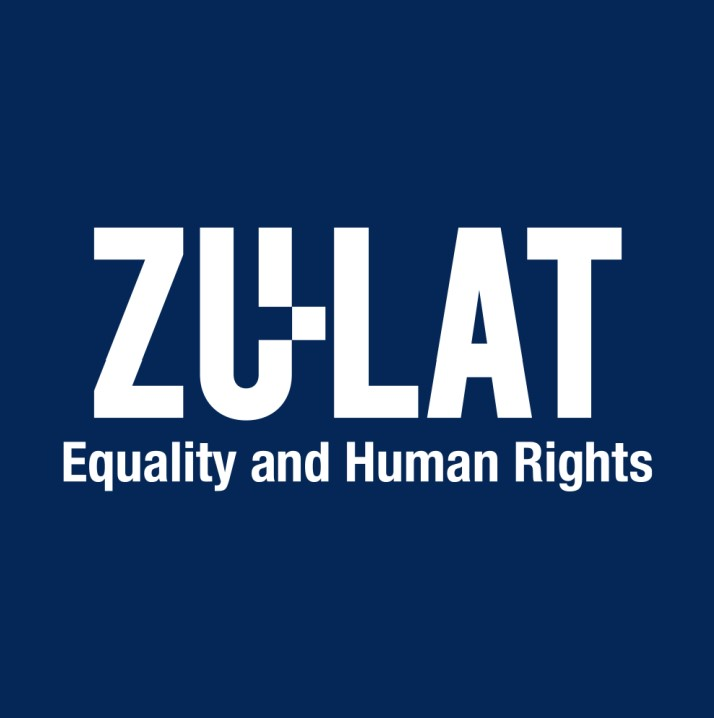
- Founded: 2019 by Zehava Galon, Ilan Baruch, and Tzali Reshef
- Founders: Tzali Reshef, Elias Metanes, Naomi Chazan, Yossi Yona, Nehama Karpol-Burak
- Type: Non-profit; NGO
- Location: Based in Tel Aviv, Israel
- Services: Research, Lobbying
- Fields: Human Rights
- Executive Director: Einat Ovadia
- Website: en.zulat.org.il

Zulat for Equality and Human Rights is an Israeli research institute operating as a nonprofit organization whose aim is to promote left-wing policies. It supports Israeli political and other bodies that work toward enhancing values and achieving goals identified with a left-liberal worldview: bolstering human rights, civil rights, equality, and partnership among all sectors of Israeli society. The advancement of these goals is primarily conducted in the political arena by means of information campaigns and Lobbying vis-a-vis decisionmakers in the Israeli Government and the Knesset, the creation of data resources by means of funding research, and the active presentation of information to decisionmakers in order to impact on the political echelon and on influencers in the Media.

== Background ==
Zulat is an NGO established in 2019 by Zehava Galon (former chairperson of the Meretz party), Ilan Baruch, and Tzali Reshef. According to its founders, its creation became necessary in response to similar bodies with a right-wing agenda.

== Methods ==
Zulat works to achieve its goals primarily in the political arena. The methods used include:

- Funding of research on political, social, and economic issues in order to acquire up-to-date and relevant information to promote its goals. Zulat's research focuses on such issues as regime and governance, Social equality, equality for Palestinian citizens of Israel, Gender equality, a free media, and the human rights of Palestinians in the West Bank.
- Publication of information and Zulat's positions to amplify awareness, mainly in the form of reports, public opinion polls, policy papers, and Position papers. The institute publishes surveys examining the views of the Israeli public on issues related to equality and human rights, and uses these publications to support legislative amendments, political reforms, and proposals for policy changes.
- Advocacy activities among decisionmakers, such as participation in debates of the Knesset Foreign Affairs and Defense Committee.

== Reports ==
- Pseudo Democracy: State of the Regime in Israel: Examines processes since the inception of the state to the present which, according to Zulat, have infringed upon the democratic character of the regime. It concludes that the Israeli regime conforms to a hybrid model combining democratic components alongside authoritarian ones, and shows that the authoritarian tendencies intensified during the 12 years of Binyamin Netanyahu's second tenure as prime minister. An appendix proposes 15 new laws and legislative amendments to curb this regression and strengthen the defenses of democracy.
- Fake News and the Violation of Human Rights: Challenges and Responses: Identifies and characterizes the human rights that are violated in Israel as a result of fake news, such as the right to privacy, the right to equality, the public's right to free elections, and the right to health. Focusing on the generators of fake news, it presents operative proposals to deal with the phenomenon while remaining sensitive to the need to protect freedom of expression. The report was discussed in the Constitution, Law and Justice Committee of the Knesset on 3 January 2022.
- Jerusalem From Gender Perspective and Human Rights Point of View: The report was written to mark the 20th anniversary of United Nations Security Council Resolution 1325, which ruled that women should be included in decision-making centers about peace and security issues, and the 54th anniversary of the occupation of the Palestinian territories. The author, Adi Granot, interviewed Jewish and Palestinian women living in Jerusalem about their different life experiences and reviewed the violation of their human rights under the reality of the occupation.
- The Human Rights of Older Persons in Times of COVID-19: Written upon the establishment of Zulat in the midst of the COVID-19 crisis, the report views the connection between the pandemic and human rights. It elaborates specifically on the violation of the rights of older persons, including the right to dignity, the right to participation, and the right to health. It asserts that imposing special restrictions on individuals and groups solely because of their age violates the human right to dignity and equality and constitutes ageism, and goes on to suggest ways to provide a social, cultural, and health response for the elderly population. The report was discussed by the Knesset's Special Committee on the Novel Coronavirus and for Examining the State's Preparations for Epidemics and Earthquakes on October 21, 2020.
- This Is No Annexation, This Is Apartheid: This report claims that at the height of the public debate in Israel on the annexation of the West Bank, the media and politicians laundered the language to hide the true meaning of annexation: apartheid. Appended to the report is a "glossary" offering "an alternative language more faithful to reality to replace the whitewashed annexation discourse."

== Policy papers ==
- Selective Enforcement: Repeal of Ban on Flag Hoisting: Under Article 82 of the Police Ordinance, flag hoisting may be banned if it is perceived to disrupt public safety. In practice, the law is enforced primarily in East Jerusalem's Palestinian neighborhoods and in demonstrations, in violation of human rights and freedom of protest. Therefore, Zulat proposes to delete this article from Israel's law books.
- Ensuring Freedom of Information: Accessing Facts and Figures of Interest to the Public: Zulat together with the Movement for Freedom of Information in Israel propose to amend Article 9(a)(3), whereby it would be up to the Freedom of Information Commissioner to disclose information of public interest and strike the necessary balance between the right to receive information and invasion of privacy, contrary to the standing practice of the past 20 years whereby the decision is made by the courts. Such an amendment would expand the commissioner's powers as well as freedom of information and the press.
- The Right to Vaccination: Dealing With Vaccine Hesitancy: At the height of the COVID-19 vaccination campaign, this paper cast a spotlight on the "vaccine hesitancy" phenomenon: people who are not necessarily opposed to vaccines but remain uncertain about their use. It showed that human rights issues, such as access to distinct and reliable information, had a decisive effect on a person becoming an "anti-vaxxer" and offered possible solutions.
- Establishing Human Rights Commissions and Strengthening Status of State Comptroller: Highlights the fact that more than 120 countries in the world have at least one national institution in charge of promoting and protecting human rights, but Israel is not one of them. It proposes to establish a national human rights commission and local ones, as well as to enshrine the State Comptroller's role as the chief protector of human rights in the existing Basic Law.
- A Camera on Every Policeman: Exposing Police Violence, Protecting the Rights of Protesters: Points out that although police officers wear body cameras at demonstrations, they are not required to activate them. It proposes to enact a law whereby officers would be required to switch on their bodycams to further deter police violence toward protesters.

== Position papers ==
- Fighting Violence Against Women: Support for Israel's Signing of Istanbul Convention: This paper was drafted in response to Interior Minister Ayelet Shaked's opposition to Israel's accession to the Istanbul Convention on Preventing and Combating Violence Against Women and Domestic Violence. It argues that Israel's accession will not only cause no harm, but will help the state combat violence against women. Zulat called on Justice Minister Gideon Sa'ar to join the treaty, asserting that the fear voiced by Minister Shaked that signing the convention might force Israel to throw open the gates and grant refugee status to any woman who has been persecuted in her country, as well as her apprehension about the Council of Europe's oversight mechanisms and about the infringement of Israel's sovereignty, are totally unfounded.
- Accepting Refugees From Ukraine: Government's Plan Illegal and Immoral: This report claims that the government's revised road map does not give enough thought to human rights issues and offers an alternative plan based on international law and moral considerations. Zulat's proposal calls for doing away with any discrimination between Jewish and non-Jewish refugees and taking into consideration their specific needs upon their temporary settlement in Israel.
- Citizenship and Entry into Israel Law: Ban on Discrimination in Family Reunifications: The paper criticizes the government's proposal (subsequently approved) to extend the temporary provision in the Citizenship and Entry into Israel Law, which negates family reunification in cases where one of the spouses is a Palestinian resident of the territories.
- Rights in Criminal Proceedings: Ensuring Principle of Equality in Justice Ministry's Proposed Basic Law: This report explains the importance of enshrining equality in every Basic Law, but especially in criminal proceedings, where there are inherent differences of power between the state and the defendant or suspect.
- 30th Anniversary of Basic Law: Human Dignity and Liberty: This report calls for the legislation of individual Basic Laws anchoring the civil and human rights that were omitted from the short list of rights recognized in Basic Law: Human Dignity and Liberty. These include the right to equality, the right to freedom of religion and conscience, and the right to freedom of expression. It also calls for enacting a Basic Law: Legislation that would separately anchor judicial review of ordinary and basic laws, thereby allaying political and public criticism of the Supreme Court.
- ‘Putting the Brakes’ on National Plan To Reduce Regulation: This document was submitted to the Knesset's Constitution, Law and Justice Committee as part of its discussions ahead of the establishment of the Regulatory Authority. It argues that the new body should take into consideration human rights aspects and deal with the obliviousness of state authorities toward issues that are not in their area of expertise.

== Conferences and training courses ==
Zulat holds online and in-person conferences related to its publications, in collaboration with other bodies. Together with New Israel Fund and the newspaper Haaretz, the first Israel Democracy Conference was held in November 2021 with President Yitzhak Herzog, Justice Minister Gideon Sa'ar, Defense Minister Benny Gantz, other government ministers, Knesset members, journalists, and representatives of civil society organizations in attendance.

Zulat supports the Solidarity Film and Human Rights Festival, and conducts training courses for Jewish/Arab journalists and public opinion influencers aimed at strengthening the human rights discourse in Israel.

== Legislative proposals ==
Following are some of the bills introduced by Zulat:

- Amendment of Police Ordinance (Repeal of Flag Hoisting Ban), 2022. Drafted by MKs Mossi Raz, Gaby Lasky, Ali Salalha, and Michal Rozin and placed on the Knesset agenda on June 6, 2022.
- Amendment of Police Ordinance (Mandatory Use of Bodycams at Demonstrations), 2021: Drafted by MKs Ahmad Tibi and Osama Saadi, it underwent preliminary reading on 12 January 2022 and was subsequently referred to the committee that prepares bills for their first reading.
- Amendment of Freedom of Information Law (Infringement of Right to Privacy), 2020: Drafted by MKs Gaby Lasky, Inbar Bezek, and Osama Saadi, who were subsequently joined by MKs Eitan Ginzburg and Ron Katz, it was placed on the Knesset agenda in November 2021.
- Accessibility of Female Sanitary Products in Public Buildings, 2022: New law proposed by MKs Naama Lazimi, Aida Touma-Sliman, Michal Rozin, and Gaby Lasky, placed on the Knesset agenda in June 2022.
- Amendment of Courts Law, 2022 (Establishment of Sex Offense Courts).
- Amendment of Knesset's Statutes (Integration of Principle of Equality in All Bills).
- Amendment of Citizenship Law (Ban of Discrimination in Family Reunifications of Palestinian Citizens of Israel), 2022.
- Amendments dealing with fake news phenomenon, 2021.
- Amendment of Commissions of Inquiry and Inspection Committees (Transparency of Proceedings), 2021.

== Staff ==
- Executive Director: Einat Ovadia.
- Head of Research: Dr. Zohar Kohavi, who is the brother of former Chief of General Staff of the Israel Defense Forces.
- Executive Board: former ambassador Ilan Baruch, Dr. Elias Mtanes, Nehama Karpol-Burak, Tzali Reshef, Shifra Shalit.
