= November 2019 Gaza–Israel clashes =

Series of rocket strikes conducted by Israel and the Gaza Strip

Gaza–Israel clashes (November 2019)
- Part of the Gaza–Israel conflict
- Map of Gaza Strip and Israel border
Date	12 – 14 November 2019 (2 days)
Location	Gaza Strip, Israel
Result	Ceasefire, wider confrontation avoided

Belligerents
Israel	Palestinian Islamic Jihad

Commanders and leaders
(Israel) Benjamin Netanyahu (Israel) Naftali Bennett (Israel) Aviv Kochavi	(Palestinian Islamic Jihad) Ziyad al-Nakhalah

Units involved
Israel Defense Forces; Israeli Air Force	(Palestinian Islamic Jihad) Al-Quds Brigades

Casualties and losses
None killed Several lightly wounded	39 killed 111 wounded

The Gaza–Israel clashes (November 2019) code-named by Israel as Operation Black Belt (Hebrew: מבצע חגורה שחורה), took place between the Israel Defense Forces (IDF) and Palestinian Islamic Jihad (PIJ) following the targeted killing of senior PIJ commander Baha Abu al-Ata in Gaza, and the attempted killing of senior PIJ commander Akram al-Ajouri in Damascus, Syria by the IDF. PIJ responded with rocket fire into Israel, including long-range rockets fired towards Tel Aviv, leading to several civilians being wounded. In response to the rocket fire, Israel carried out airstrikes and artillery shelling in the Gaza Strip, killing and wounding several militants as well as civilians.

A ceasefire went into effect after 48 hours of clashes, though it was breached by some Palestinian militants.

== Background ==
=== Palestinian Islamic Jihad and Baha Abu al-Ata ===
Palestinian Islamic Jihad is the second-largest militant group in Gaza after Hamas – the ruling military and political party. PIJ had financial problems in the year prior to the clashes. The group is funded by Iran, but these funds are reportedly insufficient and the leadership struggles to pay salaries to group members. In 2018 Ziyad al-Nakhalah was appointed leader of PIJ after his predecessor resigned due to bad health. Iran had put pressure on PIJ not to appoint Mohammed al-Hindi as Nakhalah's second-in-command because he wanted the group to form ties with more parties such as Turkey, Qatar and Egypt. Although he was not appointed as a deputy, he is regarded as such. Instead, Akram al-Ajouri, who was also a target of an Israeli attempted assassination on 12 November, was appointed. Within these power struggles in the group, Baha Abu al-Ata, the main target of the Israeli attack, stands out as a separatist. He is the commander of the PIJ's northern sector of the Gaza Strip and held responsible by Israel for rocket attacks on Israel.

=== Israel–Hamas talks ===
The clashes erupted during a time of talks between Israel and Hamas, the military and political leader of the Gaza Strip, on a future settlement to the conflict between the two. In the second half of October 2019, an envoy of the PIJ officials, headed by PIJ leader Al-Nakhalah, was invited to the Egyptian capital to discuss the future calm with Israel. Officials from abroad and from Gaza, including Abu al-Ata, whose killing sparked the November clashes, were invited. Egypt had made attempts to invite members of both the military and political branches of the group, in sight of its internal disputes. The PIJ officials reported that the talks were good and planted roots for further cooperation with Hamas and between both groups and Egypt for the sake of an agreement with Israel. The Egyptian government had made a gesture for the group when it released 25 imprisoned members of the group and let them return to Gaza, a move that was coordinated with Israel.

Ten days after the talks the PIJ fired rockets on Israeli communities near Gaza. Hamas and Egypt were angered with this act. This caused disagreements among the Egyptian side on the future of ties with the PIJ. Egypt also threatened to stop the mediation with Israel if Hamas could not restrain the PIJ. Israel held Abu al-Ata responsible for the rocket attacks.

=== Targeted killing of Baha Abu al-Ata ===
Before dawn on 12 November, the Israeli Air Force carried out a targeted killing airstrike on Baha Abu al-Ata in Gaza. The airstrike struck the top floor of an apartment building where he was sleeping, killing him and his wife. Two other people were injured. Simultaneously, Syrian state media stated that Israel had fired 3 missiles at a house in Damascus, targeting Akram al-Ajouri. The strikes failed to kill al-Ajouri, but 2 people including his son were killed and 6 others injured. Later that day, Israel confirmed the strike on al-Ata, saying that he was responsible for several attacks on Israel during 2019, including dozens of rocket launches during clashes in May 2019 and sniper attacks on Israeli soldiers. This attack marks a change in Israel's strategic policy against Gaza. In recent years, every time a group other than Hamas attacked Israel, the response was an attack on Hamas, which is held responsible for every attack from Gaza. This time, Israel has attacked the PIJ directly, while avoiding any attack on Hamas.

Immediately following the initial attacks and the return fire from Gaza, the Home Front Command put part of the Israeli population in partial lockdown depending on the area. Citizens from Southern and Central Israel were told to refrain from all congregation, to stay home from all workplaces deemed 'not critical' and in addition, all schools and universities were closed until further notice.

== Timeline ==
=== 12 November ===
Rocket fire began shortly after the targeted killings of PIJ leaders in Gaza and Syria. The rocket fire was retaliated by Israeli airstrikes and artillery shelling on Gaza. At the end of the day the IDF said it had carried out 20 airstrikes and 10 artillery shelling as a response to about 200 rockets fired from Gaza. According to IDF 90% of the rockets were intercepted by the Iron Dome defense system. Magen David Adom had treated 46 people, most of whom were wounded while running for shelter or of shock. Throughout the day, seeing how the backlash from Gaza was far lighter than anticipated, the restrictions set in place for the public, were slowly rolled back and people went back to work/school in the Center of Israel. In the South of Israel, rocket fire continued into the night.

During the day at al-Ata's funeral, senior Islamic Jihad official Khaled al-Batsh labeled the two Israeli strikes in Gaza and Syria a "declaration of war", and vowed that the group's response would "rock the Zionist entity". Hamas stated that the killing of al-Ata would not go unpunished.

=== 13 November ===
After six hours without any attacks from both sides between Tuesday and Wednesday, rocket fire from Gaza resumed with a morning barrage that reached Netivot in the south and Beit Shemesh in central Israel. The rockets were intercepted by the Iron Dome system. In one of the attacks, the IAF attacked a Palestinian rocket squad. The Palestinians reported that two people were killed and two injured in this attack. Among the sites hit by the IAF were rocket caches and a PIJ training base in Gaza City, which also housed a factory for rocket parts, the IDF claimed. The number of killed by IAF strikes in Gaza rose to 26 on this day. The IDF claimed that out of the first 24 Gazans who got killed, 20 were terrorists. The IDF provided names and pictures of only nine of them. Among those killed in Israeli airstrikes are a PIJ field commander and a Palestinian father and two of his sons. As a result of the fighting, the Friday Palestinian riots on the Gaza border were canceled.

By night, over 400 rockets were reportedly fired from Gaza on Israel since the beginning of the hostilities. 60% of the rockets hit open fields, while the IDF said the Iron Dome defense system has had a success rate of 90% against rockets that were projected to hit populated areas. Most of the rockets fired that day were aimed at the Israeli communities in the vicinity of Gaza, with a few reaching Ashdod, some 25 kilometers north of Gaza, and further. The PIJ spokesman Abu Hamza has claimed the group had hit sensitive Israeli military sites, a fact being censored by Israel, according to his account. He also claimed that Israel censored the damage caused to factories, headquarters, civilian houses in Gaza's vicinity and urban areas. Israeli media has released several pictures and videos of direct hits in Israeli communities. In a statement given by PIJ leader Ziyad al-Nakhalah, he did not mention any military sites that were hit, and said that despite the minor damage caused to the cities, the message was delivered, as many cities in Israel were "shut down" by the sirens.

At noon, a PIJ official stated that the group is not interested in a discussing a ceasefire with Israel at the moment and will only do so after the "message" to Israel is delivered. As the firing continued, PIJ leader Ziyad al-Nakhalah headed to Cairo in the evening to discuss ceasefire attempts with the Egyptians. United Nations Special Coordinator for the Middle East Peace Process, Nickolay Mladenov, also arrived at Cairo that night. An Israeli official had confirmed that talks are being held between Israel and the PIJ. Al-Nakhalah detailed the PIJ terms for a ceasefire in an interview to the Lebanese Al Mayadeen TV channel. He demanded Israel to take measures to ease the Blockade of the Gaza Strip, stop the targeted killings in the West Bank and Gaza Strip, and stop using live ammunition against violent protesters on the border fence with Gaza. Few hours after the interview was aired, a rocket barage from Gaza has reached the city of Rehovot, some 25 kilometers from Tel Aviv. The IAF attacked a PIJ naval base near Khan Yunis in the southern Gaza Strip in retaliation. Israeli sources claimed that the PIJ was trying to create a false impression of achievements. As rocket attacks continued in southern Israel by midnight, 8 people were killed in an Israeli attack in Deir al-Balah. Palestinian sources stated that among them were two women and five youth, all civilians.

=== 14 November ===
On 14 November PIJ said an Egyptian-brokered ceasefire with Israel had been agreed. The truce was in force from 5:30am local time (03:30 GMT), according to PIJ's spokesman, Musab al-Braim. He claimed that "Israel has surrendered to the conditions of the resistance". Despite these statements, less than an hour after the truce officially began a rocket barage was fired Israeli communities in the Gaza vicinity. Later, rockets were fired at Ashkelon and Netivot, where a shrapnel fell near a kindergarten. As the rocket attacks and air strikes ended, Israel has gradually lifted all of the security restrictions on its citizens until all communities were allowed to go back to normal life at noon. Later in the day, the truce was violated by Palestinian Islamic Jihad four times, leading the IDF to respond by striking Rafah.

== Casualties and damage ==
A total of 34 people were killed in Gaza during the 48 hours of clashes. According to Israel 25 of them were militants. The Palestinian Labour Minister in Gaza estimated the damage caused by Israel's attacks at half a million US Dollars. The IDF has reported that 450 rockets were fired from Gaza since the beginning of the clashes before dawn on 12 November.

== See also ==
- November 2018 Gaza–Israel clashes
- Gaza–Israel clashes (May 2019)
