= Baha Abu al-Ata =

Palestinian militant leader (1977–2019)

- بهاء أبو العطا
- Born: 25 November 1977; Shuja'iyya, Gaza City, Palestine
- Died: 12 November 2019 (aged 41)
- Military career
- Allegiance: Islamic Jihad Movement in Palestine
- Conflicts: Gaza–Israel conflict; November 2019 clashes †

Baha Abu al-Ata (Arabic: بهاء أبو العطا; 25 November 1977 – 12 November 2019) was a leader of the Islamic Jihad Movement (PIJ). On 12 November 2019, the Israel Defense Forces (IDF) killed Abu al-Ata and his wife in a targeted killing, four of their children and a neighbour were also reportedly injured. The killings triggered clashes between Israelis and Palestinians. Khalil Bathani became the new leader of PIJ.

== Al-Quds Brigades ==
Al-Ata was born on 25 November 1977 in Shuja'iyya. He joined Al-Quds Brigades, an armed wing of the Islamic Jihad Movement in Palestine, in 1990, later becoming its head. The Israeli Defence Forces (IDF) said, before his death, that Abu al-Ata commanded the PIJ's efforts in the northern region of the Gaza Strip, and was responsible for several attacks carried out against Israel in 2019, such as missile strikes towards the Israeli city of Sderot in August, and against the city of Ashdod in September. According to the IDF, Abu al-Ata planned to execute additional attacks in the future.

== Death ==
On 12 November 2019, the IDF killed Abu al-Ata in a targeted air strike. The operation was based on specific intelligence provided by Shin Bet. Clashes began between Gaza and Israel following his death.
