= Casualties of Israeli attacks on the Gaza Strip =

Mass civilian casualties of Israeli bombing, shelling and rocket attacks on the Gaza Strip have occurred in the Israeli–Palestinian conflict, in which Israeli bombing attacks on the Gaza Strip cause numerous civilian fatalities. (Note: 'Firing missiles and bombs at residential buildings in densely populated areas such as the Gaza Strip inevitably involves serious risk of harm to civilians. The danger is not hypothetical: in recent years Israel has already killed thousands of civilians, including hundreds of children, in airstrikes on their homes. (B'Tselem 2019)) The reason for such operations is purportedly to carry out targeted assassinations of militants from Hamas, Islamic Jihad and other groups seen to be a threat to Israel, whose Shin Bet data banks monitor thousands of Palestinians for targeting. Israel regards such cases as either unfortunate errors, (Note: Thousands of Palestinian civilians have been killed in such operations, according to Amira Hass: 'Thousands of Palestinian civilians have been killed or wounded by such "errors," not to mention the thousands of others who were killed or wounded intentionally after the IDF decided that it is proportionate to bomb homes with all of their residents inside because one of them was classified as a member of a Palestinian military organization, or that it's proportionate to fire at demonstrators with live ammunition.' (Hass 2019)) the consequence of civilians being allegedly used to shield militants, or as acceptable collateral damage.

== Massacres in 1956 ==
=== Khan Yunus massacres ===
Two militant leaders from the Gaza Strip — Ziyad al-Nakhalah of Palestinian Islamic Jihad and Abdel Aziz al-Rantisi of Hamas — report losing family members in the Khan Yunis massacre, that occurred during the Egyptian-Israeli war of 1956 (often referred to as the Suez Crisis). Ziyad al-Nakhalah was born on 6 April 1953 in Khan Yunis, Gaza Strip, then under Egyptian occupation. Nakhalah's father was killed by the Israeli army in 1956 during the Khan Yunis massacre. Al-Nakhalah trained as a teacher in Gaza City.

=== Rafah massacre ===
The Rafah massacre occurred on November 12, 1956, during Israel's occupation of the Sinai Peninsula and Gaza Protectorate following the Suez Crisis. The town of Rafah, lying on the Egypt–Gaza border, had been one of two invasion points during the initial incursion by the Israel Defense Forces into the Strip on November 1.

Israel neither denied nor acknowledged any wrongdoing, while admitting that a number of refugees were killed. Refugees, it is also claimed, continued to resist the occupying army.

The Palestinian version maintains that all resistance had ceased when the killings took place. According to survivor testimonies, IDF soldiers rounded up male individuals over fifteen years of age throughout the Gaza Strip in an effort to root out members of the Palestinian fedayeen and the Palestinian Brigade of the Egyptian Army. Israel proclaimed that the civilian population would be held collectively responsible for any attacks on Israeli soldiers during the occupation, which lasted from 1 November 1956 to 7 March 1957. Dozens of summary executions took place of Palestinians who had been taken prisoner, and hundreds of civilians were killed as Israeli forces combed through areas like Khan Yunis, and others died in several separate incidents. Calculations of the total number of Palestinians killed by the IDF in this four-month period of Israeli rule vary between 930 and 1,200 people, out of a population of 330,000.

== 2002 ==
On 22 July 2002 an Israeli F-16 dropped a one-ton bomb on the three-story apartment where Salah Shehade and his family, together with numerous other families, dwelt in the midst of the Daraj residential neighbourhood of Gaza City full of many other apartment blocks. The death toll amounted to 17 people, (Note: The original count was 15 until, the day after, two other children's bodies were dug out of the rubble (Cramer 2012, p. 38)) of whom 15 were civilians, 11 were children. In addition to Shehadeh and his bodyguard, and 15 residents killed, a further 150 were wounded by collateral damage. The then Israeli Minister for Defense, Benjamin Ben-Eliezer, stated that their information was that no civilians were in the building at the time. Dan Halutz, a year later, admitted that when taking the decision, both the government and the IDF were fully aware Shehadeh's wife was with him, but went ahead with the operation nonetheless.

=== Reactions ===
The then Prime Minister Ariel Sharon called the bombing "one of our most successful operations". Halutz in an interview where he called on NGOs like Gush Shalom to be incriminated for treason for exposing the realities, also stated no changes would be made in the decision-making and operational procedures that led to the bombing. In protesting the operation, 27 Israeli pilots signed a letter expressing their refusal to continue to participate in bombing flights over Gaza.

== 2006 ==
In a 2006 opinion essay in The Guardian, Jamila Abdallah Taha al-Shanti, a prominent female political leader in the Hamas movement, claimed that an Israeli air strike aimed at herself had instead killed her sister-in-law and over a dozen other people. International media confirmed that there had been an air strike on al-Shanti's home and that it killed Nahla Shanti and Abdel Majid Ghirbawi.

== 2009 ==
=== Zeitoun killings ===
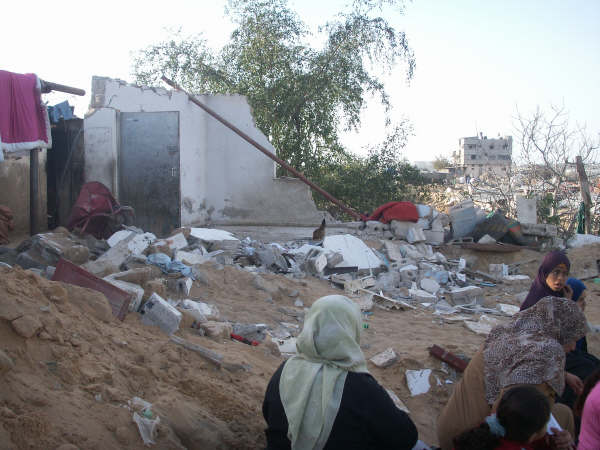
The Samouni house after bombing

The Zeitoun Incident took place on 5 January 2009 during Operation Cast Lead, after members of the Samouni extended family (Note: Eventually five Samouni families were gathered in the warehouse that was targeted:16 members of Talal Hilmi al-Samouni's family; Ibrahim al-Samouni (12 members); Rashad al-Samouni (11 members) and Nafiz al-Samouni (10 members), the four being order to relocate to the site where the family of Wael al-Samouni (11 members) lived. (Humaid 2019)) had been herded out of their homes and told to relocate to another building. In a dawn raid on the 4th, a raid into one Samouni house, using grenades and live fire, killed Ateya al-Samouni and severely wounded a four-year-old child, Ahmad, who was refused medical treatment. (Note: "The soldiers rejected entreaties to allow ambulances to approach to take Ahmad to the hospital. An ambulance dispatched from Al-Quds hospital was stopped just short of the house. The driver and a nurse were made to strip and lie on the ground, and then the ambulance was turned away. The boy died during the night." (Smith 2017, p. 138)) One of the Samoiuni men was fluent in Hebrew from working as a mechanic in Israel for 35 years and introduced the gathered members of Samouni family to Givati soldiers. The men were blindfolded and led away, and eventually 100 people, mostly women and children, were corralled into a cement block warehouse for storing fruit and vegetables. The day after the latter was subject to artillery fire and missiles from either a drone or an Apache helicopter overhead, killing 21 members of Wa'el al-Samouni's family while wounding dozens of others. The initial log at the al-Shifa hospital registered 39 al-Samouni members requiring emergency treatment.

The airstrike was ordered by Colonel Ilan Malka, then commander of the Givati Brigade, who had called up the attack after interpreting drone photographs of a cache of wooden boards the family had stacked to light a fire and heat water as rocket-propelled grenades. The men had ventured out that morning through the front door to scrounge up some firewood, and an Israeli military outpost lay a mere 80 metres away, troops were positioned on rooftops and patrols were regular with frequent interactions with local residents. When Samouni men tried to pull the injured from the ruins they were turned back with slogans, such as one – "Go back into death!" - in classical Arabic. Three days later, the IDF finally permitted Palestinian rescue teams to enter the area, and recovered 13 family members, several children, still alive. On their evacuation, the IDF bulldozed the house, and, after the conclusion of hostilities, family members came across hands and legs still poking out up from the rubble.

==== Aftermath ====
Malka was reprimanded later for using tank fire on heavily populated areas and was then appointed supervisor in the Israeli prison Service(Shabas), at least half of whose detainees are Palestinian. Despite investigations both by an internal command unit and a Military Police Investigation Unit, according to B'Tselem, no reason has ever been forthcoming for the shelling. In May 2012 Mag's Major Dorit Tuval stated that investigations excluded claims civilians were deliberately harmed or the victims of criminal negligence. For the period in question, they did indict a soldier for stealing a Palestinian civilian's credit card, another for using a 9-year-old boy as a human shield, and a third for the manslaughter of a Palestinian whose identity was not known.

=== al-Fakhura school ===
On 9 January 2014, at around 4 pm, Israel launched at a minimum four mortar shells which caused 35 dead at two different sites, in Jabalia, within 100 metres of each other, and an estimated 40 other casualties. One shell landing in the courtyard of the al-Deeb family home where, unable to purchase bread, the family had sat down to bake it, and killed 11 people gathered there, while the other three hit al-Fakhura street, killing another 24. Of the 11 members of the al-Deeb family, 4 were women and 4 children.

The 3 other mortar shellings struck the outside of the UNWRA school. (Note: Three of the Askar victims had evacuated their home on being averted by a telephone call that the IDF intended to destroy it with a missile. After relocating near the UNWRA school, the three - two sons, Imad (13) and his brother Khaled Abu Askar (19), together with their uncle, Arafat, were killed. According to the IDF news release, Imad (Abu Askar) and Hassan Abu Askar were terrorist operatives. (Goldstone 2009, pp. 150, 252))

=== Aftermath ===
Brigadier general Ilan Tal stated that the mortar crews had shot back to save their own lives.

The Goldstone Mission concluded that firing mortars into an area where 1,368 people were crowded, in a nearby UNWRA school, in order to kill a small number of militants - Israel later alleged a mortar had been fired at their forces from somewhere in that vicinity - cannot meet the terms of proportionality for warranting the military advantage gained thereby.

== 2014 ==
In what it called Operation Protective Edge launched on 8 July 2014, Israel announced it would strike houses of senior Palestinian activists in Gaza and residences which were deemed operative centres. To avoid casualties, it stated a roof knocking procedure and telephone warnings would be given in advance to alert civilians inside to evacuate within 5 minutes. In the first two days, 11 such homes were attacked with this method. According to the Israeli NGO B'Tselem this tactic contravenes International Humanitarian Law, (Note: "Bombing the homes of senior activists in armed groups violates international humanitarian law, which provides a narrow definition of what constitutes a legitimate target and permits aiming attacks only at targets that effectively assist military efforts, when damaging them can provide a military advantage. Treating these homes as legitimate targets is an unlawful, distorted interpretation of the concept, resulting in harm to civilians, whom this body of law is intended to protect." (B'Tselem 2014)) though some interpretations challenge that view. (Note: Dealing specifically with collateral damage from drones, Stuart Maslen writes:'With respect to armed drones, for the operator to have intended to target a civilian with a missile or bomb strike, it may be sufficient for jurisdiction under the ICC that the military action be conducted recklessly but not when it is the result only of negligence, much less when a civilian is hit by mere mistake.' (Casey-Maslen 2018, p. 230))

Israeli news outlet +972 magazine criticused Israel's "100-eyes-for-an eye spiral of violence".

=== Kaware family home ===
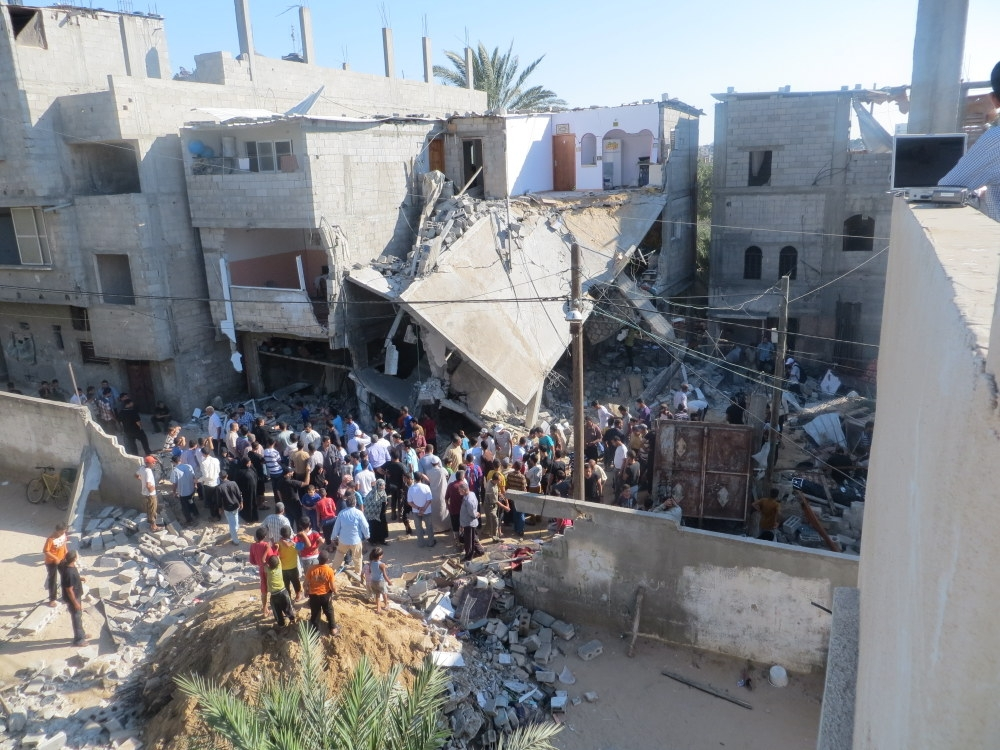
The Kaware house in Khan Yunis after bombing

At about 1:30 pm on 8 July 2014, the families in Ahmad Kaware's apartment block were informed of the imminent bombing of their 3-storey 7 apartment home, and were instructed to leave. One of the sons, 'Odeh Kaware,' was a member of Hamas's military wing. The family members, together with some neighbours waited outside. An hour and twenty minutes later, at 2:50 pm, a drone-launched missile was observed to have struck the building's solar heated water tank on the roof. Several family members and neighbours, after waiting some minutes, then entered the residence, and four reached the roof. Within ten minutes, at 3:00 pm., an F-16 fighter fired a missile which struck the building, causing it to collapse. In the IDF reconstruction, the pilot believed the building was empty when he fired. As the missile flew to its target, people were observed on the roof, but no technical means were available to avert the attack.

8 civilians were killed in the strike, including six children. 28 other people were injured, 10 of whom severely.

In its initial declaration the IDF stated that this and other homes bombed that day were attacked because they were the homes of militants. A later comuniqué, reportedly adjusting the justification in order to comply with international law distinctions, reframed the bombing as one aimed at operative military centres. (Note: "An IDF Spokesperson's announcement from yesterday, after the first round of attacks, stated only that 'among the targets attacked were four homes of activists in the Hamas terror organization who are involved in terrorist activity and direct and carry out high-trajectory fire towards Israel…'. In other words, the military itself acknowledged that the attacks were illegally aimed at homes that were not military targets. Only later was a new announcement made, in an attempt to retroactively adapt the described activity to the requirements of international law, stating that the targets were 'the homes of senior activists that function as command and control headquarters'." (B'Tselem 2014)) The Israeli army through its Military Advocate General's investigation was absolved of any malfeasance, writing that there was no fault in the actions of the IDF forces involved, and that despite the fact that the attack resulted in a regrettable outcome, it does not affect its legality post facto.'

=== Hamad family home ===
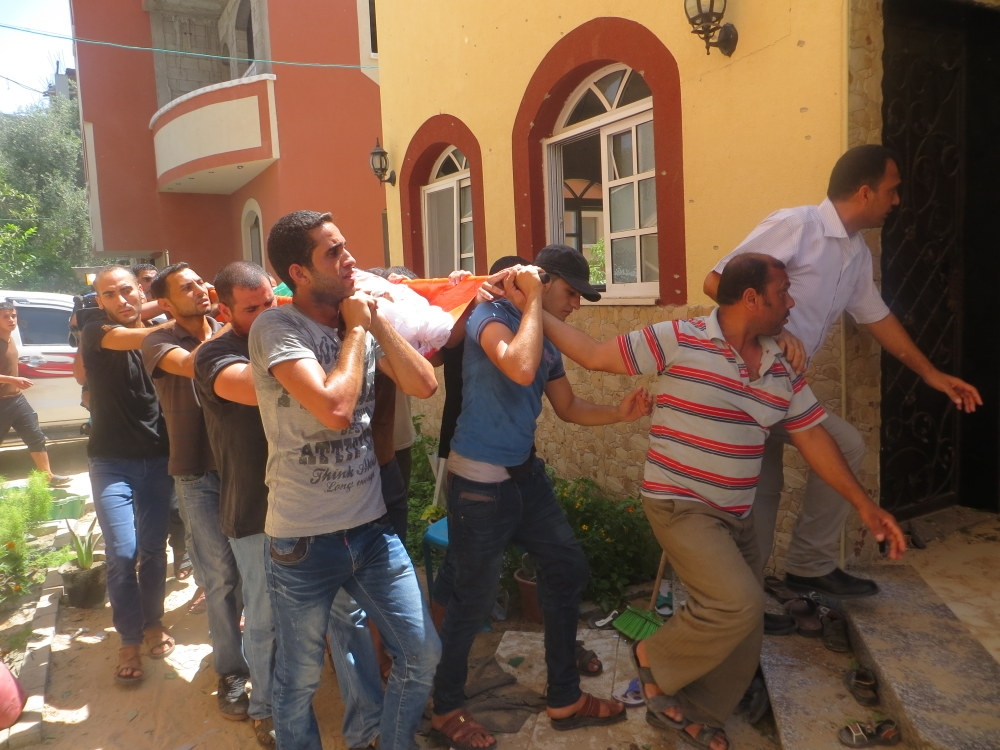
The Hamad house in after bombing

At 11:40 pm on the same day, 8 July 2014, just as the family had retired to bed, (Note: According to another source, the family were taking coffee. (al-Ghoul 2014)) the home of Hafez Hamad in Beit Hanoun was bombed without, according to B'Tselem, any prior warning. (Note: According to a Gazan writer, mobile phone networks are disactivated by Israel during drone operations because they cause electrical interference with Israeli operational communications. (Abu Saif 2015, p. 16)) Hamad was a member of Islamic Jihad's military wing, and the bombing was a targeted assassination. Six people, one militant and five civilians, were killed in the airstrike. In addition, three children were wounded.

=== Fun Time Beach café bombing ===
At 11.30 pm on 9 July 2014, during the opening phase of Israel's attack on the Gaza Strip, 9 youths gathered at the Fun Time Beach café run by the al-Sawalli family on the beachfront at al-'Izbeh, near Khan Younis to watch a match between Argentina and the Netherlands in the 2014 FIFA World Cup knockout stage were killed when an Israeli missile destroyed the shack.

=== Zoroub family ===
Around midnight on 1 August 2014, without prior warning, an Israeli airstrike struck the home of Rafat Oudeh Mohammed Zoroub in western Rafah killing 15 family members, 4 women and 11 children, A further 4 people in the building at the time were wounded.

=== Al-Dalu and Al-Deif families ===
On 19 August 2014, the Israeli air force struck a residential building, in what they claim was an attempted targeted killing of Mohammed Deif.

== 2018 ==
=== Rouzan al-Najjar ===
Rouzan al-Najjar was a Palestinian nurse/paramedic who lived in Khuzaa, a village near the Gaza Strip's border with Israel. Her family lived in an apartment within eyeshot of Israeli soldiers stationed over the border. Their area had a four-metre-high (13 ft) concrete wall installed to shield local residents from Israeli fire.

She was killed by the Israel Defense Forces (IDF) while volunteering as a medic during the 2018 Gaza border protests. She was fatally hit by a bullet shot by an Israeli soldier as she tried to help evacuate the wounded near Israel's border fence with Gaza. The IDF first denied that she was targeted, while not ruling out that she may have been hit by indirect fire. Israeli human rights group B'Tselem said that al-Najjar was shot intentionally.

After her death, the IDF released footage in which she purportedly admitted to participating in the protests as a human shield at the request of Hamas. The video was later found to be a clip from an interview with a Lebanese television station that had been edited by the IDF to take al-Najjar's comments out of context. In the unedited video, she didn't mention Hamas and called herself a "rescuing human shield to protect and save the wounded at the front lines", with everything following "human shield" trimmed out of the Israeli clip. The IDF was widely criticized for attempting posthumous character assassination by tampering with the video.

== 2019 ==
=== al-Madhun family ===
On late Sunday afternoon, 5 May 2019, a complex in the al-'Atatrah neighborhood comprising a grocery store and three residential units, owned and inhabited by the extended al-Madhun family in the western sector of Beit Lahiya were targeted for an airstrike. 3 members of the family, and a neighbour, were killed by the missile.

Another five children of the family were wounded, together with the neighbour's daughter. The purpose of the strike was to kill 'Abdallah al-Madhun the son, known to be a local operative for Islamic Jihad's armed wing, Saraya Al-Quds. Amani's fetus was later identified by the husband as one of the dead.

=== Zoroub Building strike ===
On 5 May 2019 at 5:40 pm in succession three Israeli missiles, including a GBU-39 series guided bomb, struck the lower floors of the six floor Zoroub building in Rafah. The Israeli army's Twitter account related that they had struck "terrorist operatives" at that time. According to Human Rights Watch, the three victims appear to have been civilians.

Local testimonies said that Islamic Jihad had had a media office in the building, until they moved to another location three months earlier. Human Rights Watch concluded from an investigation that there was no evidence for the building being a current military objective.

=== The al-Ghazali/al-Jidyan families ===
Three hours after the al-Madhun strike, at 8 pm on Sunday 5 May 2019 an Israeli airstrike on a building in the Sheikh Zayed residential complex of Beit Lahiya killed six civilians, including a police officer or legal advisor to the Gazan Interior Ministry, from two families resident on the top fifth floor.

9 other people were injured by the strike. According to testimony by the al-Jidyan couple's surviving son, Muhammad Abu al-Jidyan, no prior warning, either by telephone or roof knocking had been given. According to local reports, no militants were present in the building, while Human Rights Watch concluded that one militant was in the site at the time. He had just entered the building and was walking up the stairs when the strike was unleashed. He was not injured. (Note: "A local journalist told Human Rights Watch that a senior commander from Islamic Jihad said to him that he had just entered the residential building and was walking up the stairs when the strike took place. The commander was not injured, the journalist said." (HRW 2019))

=== Al-Sawarki family ===
After the Israeli targeted assassination of Baha Abu al-Ata triggered a round of fighting, Gazan militants responded and the incidents escalated. Over two days 34 Gazan militants were killed. Sources in Gaza claim 16 were civilians (Abuheweila & Halbfinger 2019) were killed, while 111 were injured and 63 Israelis required medical treatment. Just before hostilities ended, 9 members of the Malhous family, including five children and two women, related to the Bedouin Al-Sawarka clan, (Note: Transliterated Asoarka in some sources.) were killed when an IAF air raid deployed two fighters armed with four JDAMs to target two flimsy tin sheds in Deir al-Balah, one of several in a complex of rundown shacks and greenhouses, where the family lived. The result was a crater measuring 50 feet wide and 20 feet deep. The strike took place just hours before a ceasefire was due to take effect. The high resolution aerial photography available for such targeting should have revealed that what the Israeli military called a compound, to be nothing more than two shacks.

Israel defence officials later stated they were surprised by the casualties and admitted it had been a mistake. According to local sources they were a simple sheep and goat-herding folk who had resided there, in a shack devoid of water and electricity, for a long time, some claimed 20 years. It is no secret, Gazan sources say, that top commanders in the area do not live in squalor, as did the family of Abu Malhous. Initially, the IDF's Arabic-language spokesman, Avichay Adraee falsely claimed that the father Abu Malhous had been in command of Islamic Jihad's rocket squadrons in central Gaza. No such person is known to belong to the Islamic Jihad organization. The report was declared to be false by Haaretz, and admitted to be so later by Israeli Defence officials who looked into the matter. It was reported that Avichay Adraee based his statement on a rumour circulating among civilian users of an Israeli Telegram group, and that the army's original identification of the shack as terrorist infrastructure was based on rumours in social media. It emerged that Israeli intelligence hadn't reportedly (Note: However, in the wake of the publication of Yaniv Kubovich's Haaretz investigation, the IDF Spokesman released another statement, "The building was confirmed as a target several days before the attack." (Levy 2019)) controlled the target for a year prior to the strike, that no check had been conducted to ensure civilians were not present, and that the site had not been reexamined by Israeli intelligence agencies in the preceding months. Islamic Jihad identified the photo of the assumed Jihad militant provided by the IDF spokesman as the victim of the strike as that of another person, a commander in Rafah, who is still alive.

Military officials in Israel stated that "civilian casualties are unavoidable in Gaza's teeming neighborhoods." The IDF, promising an investigation, stated that they were still trying to figure out what the family had been doing on the site, but undertook to examine and review the case in detail. In December 2019, the Israeli investigation admitted a mistake had been made from an error in its data base that had failed to note that it was a civilian area with, in the IDF's view, some military use, for which Palestinian factions were to blame.

=== Reactions ===
Gideon Levy commented:

Had they been Israeli citizens, the state would have moved heaven and earth to avenge the blood of its famous little boy, and the world would have reeled in shock at the cruelty of Palestinian terror.

The European Union urged Israel to ensure that the investigation it conducts is "transparent", saying it would "closely follow it". Hamas, which controls the Gaza Strip, said that it would call on the International Criminal Court to look into the incident. Farhan Haq, speaking for the office of UN Secretary General António Guterres, urged Israel to move swiftly to investigate the incident. The European Union, undertaking to monitor the case, also called on Israel to ensure its investigation would be "transparent". The governing power of the Gaza Strip, Hamas, broached the idea of asking the International Criminal Court to examine the incident.

== 2021 ==
According to the Gazan Ministry of Health, there were 243 deaths and over 1910 injuries, including both civilians and militants, over the course of the May 2021 conflict. The death toll includes 65 children and 39 women. The injury count includes 560 children, 380 women, and 91 elderly. The U.N. claims 116 civilians were killed in IDF strikes. The IDF claims at least 225 militants were killed, but did not release a comprehensive civilian death toll. However, they did acknowledge 42 civilians were killed during their attacks on the underground tunnel network

=== Al-Wehda Street Airstrikes ===
After midnight on Sunday, May 16, 2021, the Israeli Air Force launched a series of airstrikes on Al-Wehda Street in the middle of the Gaza Strip and the Israeli bombing continued into the early hours of dawn. 46 civilians were killed, including ten women and eight children, in addition to fifty injuries with various wounds. The casualties were mostly women and children. Based on the statements of the survivors and the Palestinian Ministry of Health, all members of the al-Kulak family and the Abu al-Auf family were killed.

== 2023–present ==
Event	Total	Civilians		Children	
Event	Total	Total	%	Total	%
October 7 attacks	1,195	828	69.2% (Note: Calculated from referenced table data (828/1,195).)	36	3.01% (Note: Calculated from referenced table data (36/1,195).)
Israeli invasion and bombing of Gaza	74,370	~59,496 (Note: Calculated from referenced table data (80% of 74,370).)	~80%	21,976	29.55% (Note: Calculated from referenced table data (21,976/74,370).)
Israeli attacks in the West Bank	1,216			254	20.89% (Note: Calculated from referenced table data (254/1,216).)

As of 9 October 2026, at least 77,632 people (75,586+ Palestinians (Note: Calculated from referenced table data (74,370+1,216).) and 2,046+ Israelis) have been reported killed in the Gaza war (in all of Israel-Palestine) according to the Gaza Health Ministry (GHM) and Israeli Ministry of Foreign Affairs, including 270 journalists and media workers, 120 academics, and over 560 humanitarian aid workers, a number that includes 393 employees of UNRWA. A study by OHCHR found that 70% of the Palestinians killed in residential buildings or similar housing were women and children.

A February 2025 analysis of deaths in Gaza between October 2023 and 30 June 2024 concluded that trauma-related deaths were undercounted by the GHM by 41% during this period. It estimated that there had been 64,260 deaths from traumatic injury by June 2024, likely exceeding 70,000 by October 2024, with 59.1% of them being women, children and the elderly. The findings do not include non-trauma-related deaths. A comparable estimate up to May 2025 would be 93,000 (77,000 to 109,000), representing 4–5% of Gaza's pre-war population. Another casualty analysis published in February 2026 estimated 75,200 violent deaths up to 5 January 2025 – 34.7% higher than the GHM's casualty count at the time, and 56.2% women, children, and elderly individuals. The analysis estimated 8,540 excess non-violent deaths. An October 2025 analysis estimated 78,318 violent deaths (70,614 to 87,504) up to 31 December 2024, with a comparable estimate of between 100,000 and 126,000 violent deaths by November 2025.

A May 2025 investigation found that a classified IDF database listed 8,900 Palestinian fighters as dead or likely dead, or 17% of the 53,000 death toll at the time, which if correct would indicate that 83% of the dead were civilians—among conflicts since 1989, only the Srebrenica massacre (though not the Bosnian war overall), the siege of Mariupol, and the Rwandan genocide have seen a higher rate of civilian casualties. In response, the IDF said that the numbers in the article are incorrect.

A survey by the Palestinian Center for Policy and Survey Research (PCPSR) reported showed over 60% of Gazans have lost family members since the war began. Thousands of more dead bodies are thought to be under the rubble of destroyed buildings. The number of injured is greater than 100,000; United Nations agencies have reported that Gaza is now home to the highest number of child amputees per capita in the world.

The majority of casualties have been in the Gaza Strip. The GHM total casualty count does not distinguish Palestinian deaths by Israeli attacks from those by other means, like friendly fire, and describes all casualties as victims of "Israeli aggression". On 3 March 2026, the GHM published the names, gender and birth date of 72,004 individual Palestinians whose identities were confirmed and continues to attempt to identify all casualties.

The October 7 attacks on Israel killed 1,195 people, including 815 civilians. Casualties have also occurred in other parts of Israel, as well as in southern Lebanon, Syria, Yemen, and Iran. As reported by the Defense Ministry, the total number of Israeli fatalities as of October 2025 is 1,152. This figure encompasses soldiers, police personnel, Shin Bet operatives, and civilian security officials who died on duty, as well as those who succumbed to accidents, illness, or suicide. Notably, around 42% of the deceased were individuals under the age of 21. According to the Israeli Ministry of Defense's Rehabilitation Division, about 1,000 soldiers are wounded every month. In August 2024, the ministry predicted that it would have to account for 100,000 disabled IDF veterans by 2030 due to the war. An August 2025 report indicated that the rise in suicides among IDF soldiers was due to psychological trauma resulting from the prolonged conflict.

== See also ==
- Military operations of the Israeli–Palestinian conflict
- Gaza–Israel clashes (November 2019)
- Al-Dalu family killing (2012)
- Casualties of the Gaza War (2008–2009)
- Khan Yunis massacre
- Battle of Rafah (1949)
- Gaza genocide

== Sources ==
- Abu Saif, Atef (2015). The Drone Eats with Me: A Gaza Diary. Beacon Press. ISBN 978-0-807-04910-5.
- Abuheweila, Iyad; Halbfinger, David M. (15 November 2019). "In Strike That Killed 5 Children, Israel Said It Took Out Gaza Militant. Now It Isn't Sure". The New York Times.
- al-Ghoul, Asmaa (13 July 2014). "Israeli strike kills family having coffee". al-Monitor.
- "Army closes investigation into the killing of 21 members of the a-Samuni family in Gaza". B'Tselem. 1 May 2012.
- Bennett, Daniel (2013). Digital Media and Reporting Conflict: Blogging and the BBC's Coverage of War and Terrorism. Routledge. ISBN 978-1-136-68800-3.
- Bergman, Ronen (2018). Rise and Kill First: The Secret History of Israel's Targeted Assassinations. Random House. ISBN 978-0-679-60468-6.
- "'Black Friday': Carnage in Rafah During the 2014 Israel/Gaza Conflict" (PDF). Amnesty International. 25 July 2015.
- Blumenthal, Max (2013). Goliath: Life and Loathing in Greater Israel. Hachette UK. ISBN 978-1-568-58972-5.
- "Bombing family homes of activists in armed Palestinian groups violates international humanitarian law". B'Tselem. 9 July 2014.
- Casey-Maslen, Stuart (2018). "Autonomous Weapons Systems and International Criuminal Law". In Casey-Maslen, Stuart; Weizmann, Nathalie; Homayounnejad, Maziar; Stauffer, Hilary (eds.). Drones and Other Unmanned Weapons Systems under International Law. BRILL. pp. 217–249. ISBN 978-9-004-36326-7.
- Cramer, Richard Ben (2012). How Israel Lost: The Four Questions. Simon and Schuster. ISBN 978-1-471-10942-3.
- Davidovic, Jovana (2018). "Proportionality and Necessity in bello". In May, Larry (ed.). The Cambridge Handbook of the Just War. Cambridge University Press. pp. 167–184. ISBN 978-1-107-15249-6.
- "Deliberately targeting homes in Gaza, Israel kills 13 civilians, 2 of them minors". B'Tselem. 12 June 2019.
- "Field Report: Israel's Attacks on Civilians and Civilian Buildings in the Gaza: 03-06 May 2019". Palestinian Centre for Human Rights. 7 July 2019.
- "Gaza: Eight family members killed, 12 critical in Israeli raids". al-Jazeera. 14 November 2019.
- "Gaza: Unlawful Attacks in May Fighting". Human Rights Watch. 12 June 2019.
- Goldstone, Richard (25 September 2009). Report of the United Nations Fact-Finding Mission on the Gaza Conflict (PDF). United Nations General Assembly.
- Gross, Judah Ari (14–15 November 2019). "IDF falsely claims it hit nonexistent rocket chief in strike that killed family". The Times of Israel.
- Hass, Amira (18 November 2019). "Israeli Intelligence Is Doomed to Err – Because It Doesn't See Humans". Haaretz.
- Holmes, Oliver; Balousha, Hazem (14 November 2019). "Gaza attacks: tentative truce after Israel strike kills eight Palestinian family members". The Guardian.
- Humaid, Maram (9 January 2019). "'We overcame but never forgot': Samouni family recount 2009 war". Al-Jazeera.
- "Israel to probe 'unexpected' civilian casualties in Gaza strike". Ynet. AFP. 15 November 2019.
- "Israel vows to investigate civilian death claims". BBC News. 16 November 2019.
- "Israeli military clears forces of wrongdoing over Gaza war airstrikes". The Guardian. 24 August 2016.
- Kabariti, Ahmad (16 November 2019). "Sawarka relatives relate hellish destruction of family of 8 in what Israelis call a 'mistake'". Mondoweiss.
- Kubovich, Yaniv; Khoury, Jack (15 November 2019). "Outdated Intelligence, Social Media Rumors: Behind Israel's Killing of Gaza Family". Haaretz.
- Levy, Gideon (17 November 2019). "No One in Israel Knew They Were Committing a Massacre, and They Didn't Care". Haaretz.
- Macintyre, Donald (2017). Gaza: Preparing for Dawn. Oneworld Publications. ISBN 978-1-786-07107-1.
- McCarthy, Rory (19 January 2009). "Amid dust and death, a family's story speaks for the terror of war". The Guardian.
- North, James (16 November 2019). "'NY Times' report on killing of Gaza family is part damage control for Israel's military". Mondoweiss.
- Patel, Yumna (26 December 2019). "Israel admits 'mistake' in killing Gaza family, refocuses blame on Palestinian factions". Mondoweiss.
- "Israel says it is probing 'harm to civilians' from deadly Gaza airstrike". NBC News. Reuters. 16 November 2019.
- Smith, Thomas W. (2017). Human Rights and War Through Civilian Eyes. University of Pennsylvania Press. ISBN 978-0-812-24863-0.
- Tait, Robert (10 July 2014). "Half of Gaza's dead 'are women and children'". The Daily Telegraph.
- Terris, Daniel (2018). The Trials of Richard Goldstone. Rutgers University Press. ISBN 978-0-813-59997-7.
- "Testimony: 9 members of family killed at home when army bombs near UNWRA school, Jabalya refugee camp". B'Tselem. 7 January 2009.
- "Testimony: Soldiers Killed and injured dozens of persons from a-Samuni family in a-Zeitun neighborhood, Gaza". B'Tselem. 8 January 2009.
- "UN urges Israel to 'swiftly' investigate massacre of family in Gaza Alaraby". Alaraby. 16 November 2019.
