= Casualties of the Gaza War (disambiguation) =

Casualties of the Gaza War may refer to:

- Casualties of the Gaza war (2023–present)
- Casualties of the Gaza War (2008–2009)
