= Footnotes in Gaza =

2009 journalistic graphic narrative by Joe Sacco

- Author: Joe Sacco
- Illustrator: Joe Sacco
- Language: English
- Subject: Khan Yunis, Rafah, Suez War
- Genre: Comics journalism
- Publisher: Henry Holt and Company; Jonathan Cape
- Publication date: 2009
- Publication place: United States
- Media type: Print, paperback
- Pages: 418
- ISBN: 0-8050-7347-7

Footnotes in Gaza is a journalistic graphic narrative by Joe Sacco about acts of violence committed by Israelis against Palestinians in Gaza during the Suez Crisis. It was published in 2009 by Henry Holt and Company in the U.S. and Jonathan Cape in the UK.

The book describes the author's quest to get to the bottom of what happened in Khan Yunis and in Rafah in Gaza in November 1956. According to United Nations figures quoted in the book, Israeli forces killed 275 Palestinians in Khan Yunis on 3 November 1956 and 111 in Rafah on 12 November 1956.

Sacco bases his book on conversations with Palestinians in Rafah and the neighbouring town of Khan Younis, and interweaves the events of 1956 with the events in Rafah at the time of the interviews—the bulldozing of homes, the death of Rachel Corrie and the reactions to the outbreak of the Iraq War.

== Critical reception ==
The New York Times book Review quotes "Joe Sacco's brilliant, excruciating books of war reportage are potent territory.... He shows how much that is crucial to our lives a book can hold" Rachel Cooke called it "truly unique" in "combining as it does oral history, memoir and reportage with cartoons in a way that, when he started out, most people – himself included, at times – considered utterly preposterous."

Publishers Weekly wrote, "Having already established his reputation as the world's leading comics journalist, Sacco is now making a serious case to be considered one of the world's top journalists, period. His newest undertaking is a bracing quest to uncover the truth about what happened in two Gaza Strip towns in 1956. . . . Sacco's art is alternately epic and intimate, but it's his exacting and harrowing interviews that make this book an invaluable and wrenching piece of journalism."

== Awards ==
- 2009 Los Angeles Times Book Prize Graphic Novel Finalist
- 2010 Ridenhour Book Prize
- 2010 Eisner Award for Best Writer/Artist–Nonfiction
- 2011 Angoulême International Comics Festival Worldview Award ("Prix regards sur le monde")
- 2012 Oregon Book Award: Pacific Northwest College of Art Graphic Literature Award

== Editions ==
- Sacco, Joe (2009). Footnotes in Gaza, Jonathan Cape, ISBN 0-8050-7347-7. Jonathan Cape, ISBN 0-224-07109-2.
