= Khan Yunis massacre =

1956 massacre in the Gaza Strip

- Part of the Suez Crisis
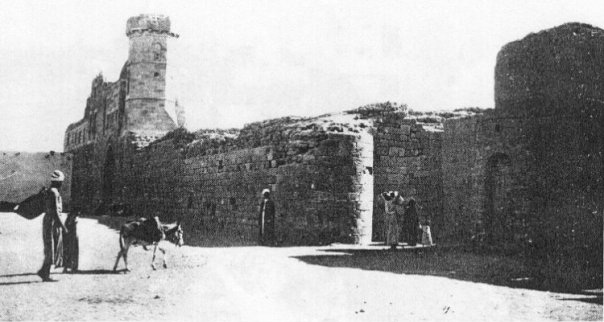
- Caravanserai of Khan Yunis, 1930s
- Location: 31.344°N 34.303°E, Khan Yunis, Gaza Strip
- Date: 3 November 1956
- Target: Male Arab villagers Suspected members of the Palestinian fedayeen
- Attack type: Massacre
- Deaths: 275+ (per UNRWA report)
- Perpetrator: Israel Defense Forces

The Khan Yunis massacre took place on 3 November 1956, perpetrated by the Israel Defense Forces (IDF) in the Palestinian town of Khan Yunis and the nearby refugee camp of the same name in the Gaza Strip during the Suez Crisis.

According to Benny Morris, during an IDF operation to reopen the Egyptian-blockaded Straits of Tiran, Israeli soldiers shot two hundred Palestinians in Khan Yunis and Rafah. According to Noam Chomsky's The Fateful Triangle, citing Donald Neff, 275 Palestinians were killed in a brutal house-to-house search for fedayeen (while a further 111 were reportedly killed in Rafah).

Israeli authorities say that IDF soldiers ran into local militants and a battle erupted.

== United Nations report ==
On 15 December 1956, the Special Report of the Director of the United Nations Relief and Works Agency for Palestine Refugees in the Near East Covering the Period 1 November 1956 to mid-December 1956 was presented to the General Assembly of the United Nations. The report told both sides of the "Khan Yunis incident". According to the UNRWA report, "the Director has received from sources he considers trustworthy lists of names of persons allegedly killed on 3 November, numbering 275 individuals". The Director's notes also acknowledge a similar incident, the Rafah massacre, immediately following that city's occupation.

== Refugee camp ==
Conflicting reports of skirmishes between the two peoples were also reported in the neighboring Khan Yunis Camp, which housed displaced Palestinian refugees. PLO official Abdullah Al Hourani was in the camp at the time of the killings. Al Hourani alleged that men were taken from their homes and shot by the Israeli Defense Forces. Hourani himself claimed to have fled from an attempted summary execution without injury.

== Aftermath ==
A curfew imposed on the citizens of Gaza prevented them from retrieving the bodies of their fellow villagers, leaving them strewn about the area overnight. Injured victims of the shootings would later be transported to Gaza City by the International Red Cross for medical treatment. Israel, bowing to international pressure, withdrew from Gaza and the Sinai in March 1957. Shortly thereafter, a mass grave was unearthed in the vicinity of Khan Yunis, containing the bound bodies of forty Palestinian men who had been shot in the back of the head.

Palestinian sources list the number at 415 killed, and a further 57 who were unaccounted for, or disappeared. According to the future Hamas leader Abdel Aziz al-Rantisi, an 8-year-old child in Khan Yunis at the time who witnessed one of the killings, of his uncle, 525 Gazans were killed by the IDF "in cold blood".

Israeli soldier Marek Gefen was serving in Gaza during the Suez Crisis. In 1982, Gefen, having become a journalist, published his observations of walking through the town shortly following the killings. In his account of post-occupation Khan Yunis, he said, "In a few alleyways we found bodies strewn on the ground, covered in blood, their heads shattered. No one had taken care of moving them. It was dreadful. I stopped at a corner and threw up. I couldn't get used to the sight of a human slaughterhouse."

== Cultural references ==
In 2009, Maltese-American comics journalist Joe Sacco published a 418-page account of the killings in Khan Yunis and Rafah, entitled Footnotes in Gaza. The graphic novel relies heavily on mostly directly retrieved eyewitness accounts. Reviewing the work for The New York Times, Patrick Cockburn wrote that, "[Sacco] stands alone as a reporter-cartoonist because his ability to tell a story through his art is combined with investigative reporting of the highest quality" and stated that "it is difficult to imagine how any other form of journalism could make these events so interesting."

Sacco acknowledges taking sides, writing "I don't believe in objectivity as it's practiced in American journalism. I'm not anti-Israeli ... It's just I very much believe in getting across the Palestinian point of view". Jose Alaniz, Adjunct Associate Professor of Comparative Literature at the University of Washington, said that Sacco uses subtle ways to manipulate the reader to make the Palestinian side seem more victimized and the Israelis more menacing.

=== Story told in Footnotes in Gaza ===
In 1956, Egyptian President Gamal Abdel Nasser ordered the nationalization of the Suez Canal, an important waterway that allowed trade to flow between the Mediterranean and the Indian Ocean, via the Red Sea. In a secret meeting at Sèvres on October 24, Britain, France and Israel agreed to launch a three-pronged offensive against Egypt. The attack began with an Israeli strike on Egyptian positions in the Sinai Peninsula on October 29. A day afterwards, Britain and France served an ultimatum on both Israel and Egypt, which was to function as a pretext for the subsequent operation by both powers to intervene and protect the Suez Canal. Both the United States and the Soviet Union demanded on October 30 that hostilities cease and that Israel withdraw its forces back to the armistice line.

The day after, French naval forces bombarded Rafah, while the RAF made bombing raids on Egyptian airfields. Israel announced it had conquered Rafah by November 1, and began shelling the Gaza Strip. Given the exercise of their veto rights in the UN Security Council by France and Britain, the two great powers were forced to obtain a resolution to that effect before the General Assembly, which duly passed a ceasefire motion on November 2, the same day that Egypt lost control of the Sinai peninsula and incursions into Egyptian-occupied Gaza via the city of Rafah occurred. At the beginning of the day the IDF broadcast that it knew of the identities of the fedayeen and would punish them for raiding Israel and that the civilian population would be held collectively responsible for such attacks. As a result, around 1,500 fedayeen fled the Strip with relatives for sanctuary to the West Bank, to Hebron and other places, or by skiffs across to Egypt. After killing or capturing all hostile militants in the latter two population centers, forces from the two ends of the Strip met in Khan Yunis on November 3. As opposed to the swift surrender of Egyptian forces in Gaza, the garrison in Khan Yunis under the command of General Yusuf al-Agrudi put up stiff resistance. Israel replied by bombing raids and artillery shelling on the town, which exacted heavy losses in civilian lives, and troops accompanied by an armoured column took the town on November 3.

Men suspected of having borne arms were executed on the spot, in their homes or places of employment, while all males from 15 years to 60 years of age were forced to muster. Two massacres of civilians then took place: The first occurred when citizens were machine-gunned down after being forced to line up against the wall of the Ottoman-era caravanserai in the city's central square. Local residents claim that the number of Palestinians shot dead in this action amounted to 100, according to oral memories collected by Joe Sacco. The other massacre took place in the Khan Yunis refugee camp. Although Israel's purpose was to root out the fedayin from Gaza, the massacres were largely wrought on civilians. According to Jean-Pierre Filiu, the process of identifying 'fedayin' was inexact, it sufficing to have a picture of Nasser on one's wall to become suspect, or be arrested because one had a similar name to someone on Shin Bet's suspect list. Occasionally local children were reported to have been used as human shields in areas where snipers were suspected of lying in wait, or where sites might have been booby-trapped.

According to one account from a fleeing fedayeen, Saleh Shiblaq, Israeli forces walked through the town on the morning of 3 November, forcing men out of their homes or shooting them where they were found. In 2003, Shiblaq told Sacco that all the old men, women, and children were removed from his household. Upon their departure, the remaining young men were sprayed with bursts of gunfire by Israeli soldiers. Adult male residents of Jalal Street were allegedly lined up and fired upon from fixed positions with Bren light machine guns, firing extraneously to the point that a stench of cordite filled the air.

== See also ==
- Media coverage of the Arab–Israeli conflict
- Occupation of the Gaza Strip by Egypt
- Kafr Qasim massacre
- Shafrir synagogue shooting attack
- List of massacres in the Palestinian territories
