= Casualties of the Gaza War (2008–2009) =

Human rights organizations and the United States Department of State estimated Palestinian casualties of the Gaza War (2008–2009) as "1,400 Palestinians killed, including more than 1,000 civilians", though Israel disagreed. The total Israeli casualties were 13, including three non-combatants and 10 combatants (four Israeli soldiers were killed in friendly fire incidents).

			PCHR	B'Tselem	Mezan	IDF	GHM
Total (non-combatants + combatants)			1,417	1,391	1,409	1,166	1,440 (Note: Does not include indirect deaths (e.g. Palestinians who died due to denial of healthcare resulting from the war).)
Non-combatants	Total unarmed civilians and police		1181	1025	1,172		
Non-combatants	Police not participating in hostilities		255 (Note: PCHR deems the 255 police officers killed in Israel's surprise attack as not taking part in hostilities, therefore non-combatants.)	248 (Note: Police totaling 248 were killed inside police stations and not known to be taking part in combat. B'Tselem categorizes any police officer killed in combat under "combatants".)			
Non-combatants	Unarmed civilians	Total unarmed civilians	926	777		295	
Non-combatants	Unarmed civilians	Women	116	110	111	49	114
Non-combatants	Unarmed civilians	Children	313	344	342	89	431
Combatants			236	350	237 (Note: Thirteen of the combatants were children.)	709 (Note: The IDF considers police officers to be combatants.)	
Unknown				32			
% combatants			17%	25%	17%	61%	
Name of every casualty published?			Yes	Yes	Yes	No	Yes
Notes							

== Other casualties ==
The World Health Organization reported that sixteen health personnel were killed and that 22 health personnel were injured over the course of the offensive. In response, the Israeli Defense Ministry stated that nine of the sixteen medical personnel killed were Hamas operatives, referring to publications on Hamas affiliated Web sites. The UNRWA reported that five of its staff members were killed and that eleven staff members were injured. The World Food Programme reported that one of its contractors was killed and that two were injured.

Hamas gunmen killed one Egyptian border guard and wounded another on December 28. Shrapnel from an Israeli air strike near the Rafah border crossing wounded two border guards and two Egyptian children. A Ukrainian woman married to a Palestinian and their daughter were killed by Israeli tank shelling on January 8; the couple's other daughter was wounded.

In 2009, the United Nations Mine Action Centre reported that 12 people have been killed and 27 injured in the Gaza Strip by unexploded ordnance since the ceasefire.

== Sources of casualty counts ==
Initial casualty counts came from the Gaza Health Ministry (GHM). Various international organizations accepted these counts, such as the United Nations Office for the Coordination of Humanitarian Affairs (OCHA) and the International Committee of the Red Cross (ICRC). Initial independent assessment was difficult because Israel would not allow media and human rights groups to enter Gaza. Israel disputed these figures, as the GHM is administered by Hamas. Later, the Al Mezan Centre for Human Rights verified the GHM casualty counts and found them to be accurate. Al Mazen Centre verified the casualty counts by interviewing the family members of each of the deceased, and verified names, ages and addresses.

Video of Israelis running to bomb shelters during a rocket attack in 2009.

Based on data collected by Amnesty International delegates in Gaza and on cases documented by local NGOs, Amnesty concluded that an overall figure of some 1,400 fatalities is accurate and that, in addition to some 300 children, 115 women and 85 men aged over 50, some 200 men aged less than 50 were unarmed civilians who took no part in the hostilities.

Israeli officials have stated that the Palestinian Ministry of Health (PMoH) significantly inflated the civilian death toll and played down the number of Hamas casualties. UN Emergency Relief Coordinator John Holmes has stated that the PMoH figures have not been seriously challenged. His report however was dated January 27, 2009, well before the Israeli Defense Forces released their final assessments which did indeed seriously challenge the PMoH figures.

In an interview published in the London-based Arabic newspaper Al Hayat (November 1, 2010), Hamas interior minister Fathi Hammad stated 200-300 members of the Al-Qassam Brigades (Hamas's armed wing) were killed. Hammad stated that Israel killed around 250 Gazan policemen on the first day of the war, and an additional 150 policemen later in the war. Israel considers Gazan policemen to be "terror operatives". Under international law, policemen are presumed to be civilians unless there is specific evidence of their participation in hostilities.

=== B'Tselem figures ===
B'Tselem wrote that the fact that a person is listed among the fatalities, or noting that a person was a civilian or that he or she was not taking part in hostilities at the time of death, does not indicate that a breach of law was committed, or that the person killed was innocent. The NGO stressed that the data does not, in and of itself, lead to legal or moral conclusions. Nevertheless, as of September 2009, B'Tselem said it did not receive satisfactory answers to about 20 cases that raise suspicion of breaches of laws of armed conflict that had been sent to Israel's Attorney General and the military's Judge Advocate General.

B'Tselem stated that their count was based on testimonies from eye-witnesses and relatives of the dead, cross-checked with investigations carried out by Palestinian and international human rights organizations. The NGO added that some difficulties in estimating the death toll could be attributed to the IDF's refusal to allow them into the Gaza Strip after the conflict had ended to supplement the work of field-researchers there. B'Tselem also noted that the IDF refused to release its list of casualties to allow B'Tselem to cross check the names against its own list.

B'Tselem wrote that its fatalities classification was based on the guidelines of the International Committee of the Red Cross (ICRC) published in June 2009. The ICRC opined that anyone who fulfills a "continuous combat function" should be considered a combatant even if he is not taking a direct part in hostilities at the moment he is killed and a person who does not fulfill a continuous combat function, but is killed when directly participating in hostilities, is also considered a combatant; persons who continuously accompany or support an organized armed group but whose function does not involve direct participation in hostilities maintain their status as civilians and are not legitimate objects of attack. ICRC spokesman said that the aim of its recommendations, which are not legally binding, was to provide the ICRC's view on to how implement the notion of 'direct participation in hostilities' in contemporary armed conflict. All 50 experts on the law of armed conflict, who provided advice to ICRC, had agreed that civilians who act as voluntary human shields should fit within the definition of persons who take direct part in hostilities, which would make them legitimate military targets, opposing to the view expressed in ICRC's publication.

In the article published in SPME, B'Tselem casualties findings were dubbed flawed due to the group's restrictive definitions of combatants, resulting in "misclassification biases". The authors also wrote that B’Tselem data show a high male to female ratio — greater than 4.0 – among teens and adults classified as non-combatants, suggesting that many dead male civilians could have been involved in combatant situations, either as shields, fighters, circumstantial helpers, sporadic helpers, or bystanders who were drawn into the goings on.

=== PCHR figures ===
The PCHR stated that the large number of civilians among the dead, as reckoned by their own Gaza informants, is proof that Israeli troops "used excessive and random force through the entire period of aggression, violating the principle of distinction between combatants and civilians". The NGO also contested the IDF figures, saying that it regarded them as a "deliberate manipulative attempt" to distort the reality of the attacks, and to "disguise Israeli illegal actions". The PCHR civilian count included Hamas members killed in what the PCHR assessed were non-combat situations. The PCHR's representative reaffirmed further its own figures, saying that extensive investigation and cross-checking was done in researching the numbers and identities of Palestinians killed; he assured that the fatalities list does not include deaths caused by "internal events" or natural causes, countering allegations from some Israeli security sources. The Israeli International Institute for Counter-Terrorism (ICT) compiled a report on their research of the casualties figures published by the Palestinian Center for Human Rights, supplemented by Hamas and Fatah websites and official Palestinian government online sources. The ICT said that many of those listed by PCHR as civilians, including civil policemen, were in fact hailed as militant martyrs by Hamas. The report went on to say that some of the civilians were Fatah members killed by Hamas and that among the youngsters counted as children by the PCHR, 18 combatants were identified. Based on their examination of age distribution of the casualties listed by PCHR, the ICT estimated that 63% to 75% of the Palestinians killed in Gaza War appear to have been specifically targeted, combat-aged males, and stated that PCHR's own data refutes the claim that Israel's attacks were indiscriminate.

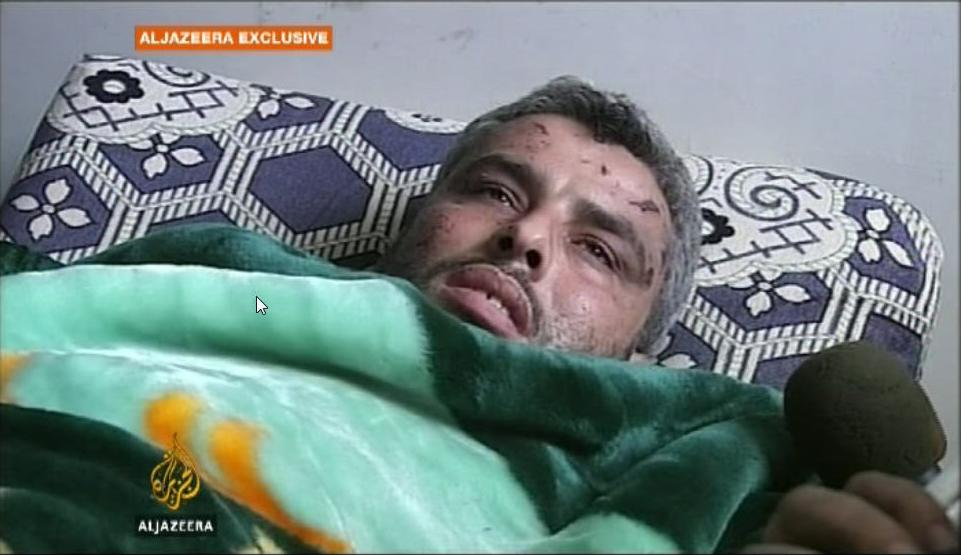
A Palestinian police officer injured during the conflict.

=== Police classification ===
The Goldstone Report concluded that the Gaza police forces were a civilian police force and "cannot be said to have been taking a direct part in hostilities and thus did not lose their civilian immunity from direct attack as civilians". The report did not "rule out the possibility that there might be individuals in the police force who retain their links to the armed groups" but finds no evidence that the police were part of the Gaza armed forces and that it "could not verify the allegations of membership of armed groups of policemen."

The NGO UN Watch stated that the Goldstone Report relies on the testimony of the Gaza police spokesperson Islam Shahwan and accepts the interpretation of his own words "face the enemy" as meaning "distributing food stuffs". In the initial response to the fact-finding mission's report, issued on September 24, 2009, the Israeli Government further added that "in seeking to support its assertion" that the police in Gaza were a civilian police force, not only did the committee reinterpret some of the evidence, but also ignored other explicit statements of the police officials, e.g. the alleged admission by Hamas police chief Jamal al-Jarrah that "the police took part in the fighting alongside the resistance".

Human Rights Watch stated that police are presumptively civilians but are considered valid targets if formally incorporated into the armed forces of a party to a conflict or directly participate in the hostilities. The IDF stated that it regards police under the control of Hamas in Gaza to be inherently equivalent to armed fighters, including them in the militant's count. The PCHR representative argued however that Israel wrongly classified 255 police officers killed at the outset of the war as militants, explaining that International Law regards policemen who are not engaged in fighting as non-combatants or civilians.

The Israeli Intelligence and Terrorism Information Center (ITIC) compiled a report saying that during Gaza War many supposedly civil policemen were at the same time operatives in Hamas's military wing. ITIC stated that Hamas' military wing recruits police officers for military operations and that police forces were drafted to fight Israel during the war in January 2009. One of ITIC bulletins also presented supposed evidence of Hamas policy to hide details of Hamas men who were killed or injured in the fighting.

B'Tselem in its fatalities' figures report wrote that it knew many police officers in the Gaza Strip are also members of the military wings of Palestinian armed groups, and might have taken part in hostilities against Israel. At the same time, the NGO did not possess concrete information on integration of police officers in the combat forces of Hamas and was unable to determine whether all the police officers were legitimate targets or whether the Palestinian police in Gaza, as an institution, is part of the combat forces of Hamas, all of whose members carry out a continuous combat function. For these reasons, police officers that were killed in an attack aimed at police or police stations, were listed by B'Tselem in a separate category.

== See also ==
- Casualties of Israeli attacks on the Gaza Strip
