= 1956 Rafah massacre =

Israeli killing of Palestinians in the Suez Crisis

Rafah massacre
- Part of the Israeli–Palestinian conflict and the aftermath of the Suez Crisis
- Location: Rafah, Gaza Protectorate
- Date: 12 November 1956
- Target: Male Palestinian Arab villagers Suspected members of the Palestinian fedayeen Egyptian Army
- Attack type: Massacre
- Deaths: ≈111 Palestinians
- Perpetrator: Israel Defense Forces

The Rafah massacre occurred on November 12, 1956, during Israel's occupation of the Sinai Peninsula and Gaza Protectorate following the Suez Crisis. The town of Rafah, lying on the Egypt–Gaza border, had been one of two invasion points during the initial incursion by the Israel Defense Forces into the Strip on November 1.

Israel neither denied nor acknowledged any wrongdoing, while admitting that a number of refugees were killed. Refugees, it is also claimed, continued to resist the occupying army.

The Palestinian version maintains that all resistance had ceased when the killings took place. According to survivor testimonies, IDF soldiers rounded up male individuals over fifteen years of age throughout the Gaza Strip in an effort to root out members of the Palestinian fedayeen and the Palestinian Brigade of the Egyptian Army. Israel proclaimed that the civilian population would be held collectively responsible for any attacks on Israeli soldiers during the occupation, which lasted from 1 November 1956 to 7 March 1957. Dozens of summary executions took place of Palestinians who had been taken prisoner, and hundreds of civilians were killed as Israeli forces combed through areas like Khan Yunis, and others died in several separate incidents. Calculations of the total number of Palestinians killed by the IDF in this four-month period of Israeli rule vary between 930 and 1,200 people, out of a population of 330,000.

== Background ==
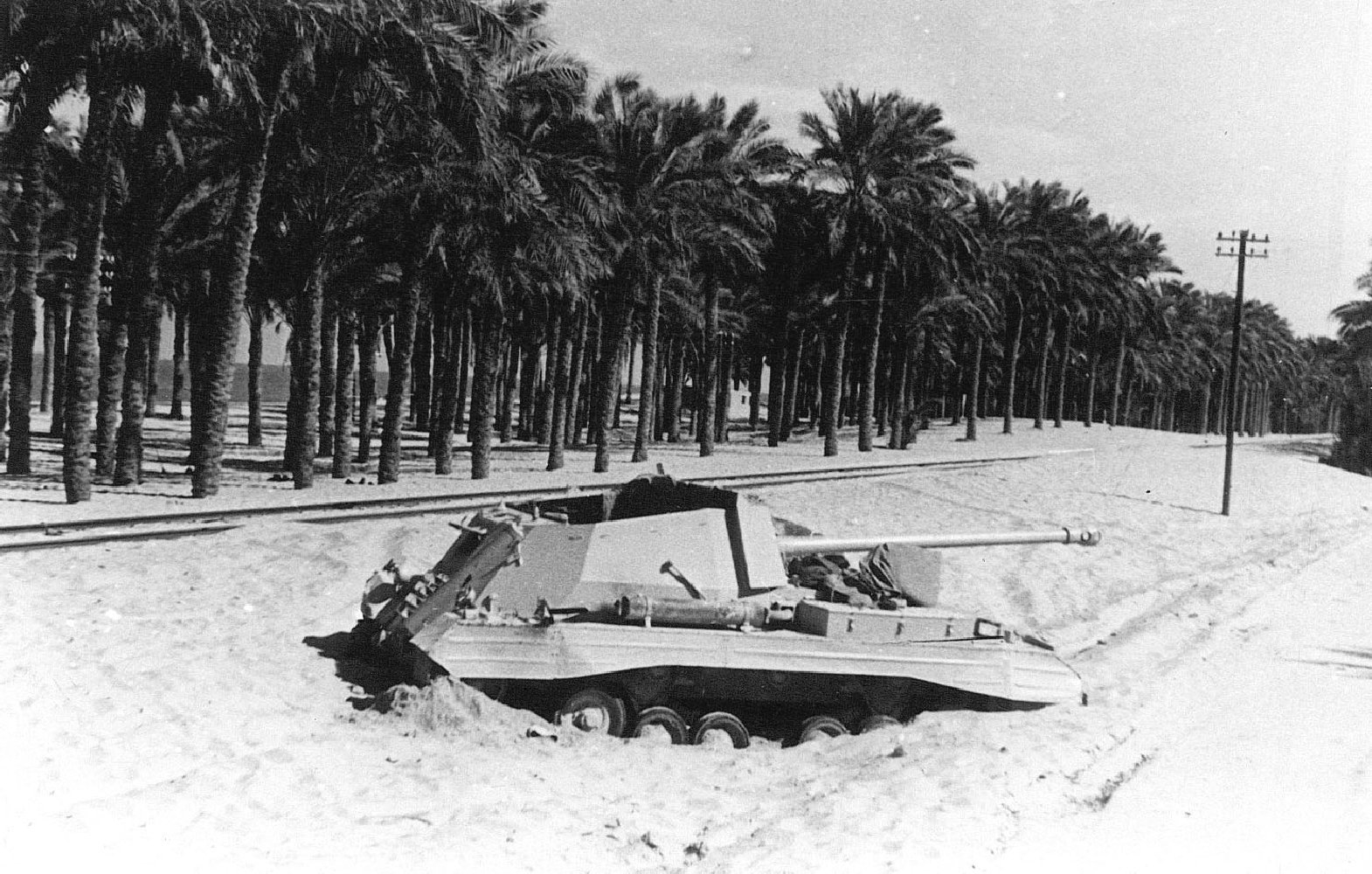
Abandoned Egyptian position on the outskirts of Rafah following its capitulation

The invasion of Rafah and the nearby Egyptian city of Arish began in the early hours of November 1, 1956. In his memoir The Sinai Campaign, Chief of Staff of the IDF Moshe Dayan wrote of the strategic importance of capturing Rafah, saying "If El Arish and Rafah were to fall to us, the Gaza Strip will be isolated and unable, alone, to hold out." Rafah's defenses collapsed within hours of Israeli arrival in the Strip, and by late morning Israeli soldiers were walking the streets of the town. Egyptian Army officers in the area removed their uniforms and fled into the interior of Rafah, attempting to blend in with the local populace. Fighting between Israeli forces and those of the Egyptians and local militants ceased on November 7.

== Events ==
=== Background – capturing the fedayeen ===
Israeli efforts to root out the fedayeen in Rafah's population on November 1 proved fruitless, save for one soldier, Ahmed Joudah. Joudah was taken from his home soon after the Israelis came to Rafah, driven out to the desert by a small group of soldiers, and killed. Rumors that he was tied to and pulled apart by two jeeps exist, but are apocryphal. As Israel took control of the Gaza Strip, it systematically sought to round up elements of the fedayin forces, estimated in some hundreds, assigning this priority over the estimated 4,000 Egyptian soldiers and Palestinian auxiliaries still trapped in the territory. On November 3 Israeli forces perpetrated the Khan Yunis massacre, wherein many Palestinian men were detained and executed, and all males between 15 and 60 years of age were ordered to present themselves to the authorities, detained and subject to interrogation.

Mass detentions of Palestinians also occurred at Deir al-Balah on November 3, at Maghazi on November 4, and at Nuseirat on the following 6–7 November, and were taken either to Gaza or to the Israeli prison at Atlit, near Haifa, in contravention to the Geneva Conventions on removal of the inhabitants of an occupied land to the occupier's territory. In Gaza City itself, early on 10 November, loudspeakers ordered men to gather in their local squares for interrogations. As a result, in the Zeitoun neighbourhood several dozen young men between 17 and 25 were arrested, blindfolded and led away. Their fate is unknown but after the Israeli withdrawal, a gravesite was excavated and 36 bodies were recovered, and were identified by a Gazan court doctor as desaparecidos from Zeitoun.

=== Rounding up of men ===
The Rafah camp contained some 32,000 people. Between 6 and 6:30 AM on November 12, an announcement was made via loudspeaker for all men between the ages of 15 and 60 (witness reports of the age asked for vary) to gather at the local schoolhouse. Israeli troops encouraged the Arab men to quickly reach the school; they encouraged this by firing their rifles into the air and sporadically beating them with sticks. A handful of Palestinians were fired upon without warning on the way to the school. According to an UNRWA official, the Israeli loudspeaker summons was not heard throughout all of Rafah, and insufficient time was given for those summoned to reach the screening points, so that many refugees ran in order not to show up late. It appears soldiers panicked on observing the rush and opened fire on the crowd.

As men were mustered at an UNWRA school in Al-Bahr street, Israeli troops positioned along the street would fire over their heads to make them hurry, but also shoot, to either wound or kill, stragglers, who they claimed to be fedayin. As a steady flow of military-age males gathered near the school, Israeli soldiers searched homes in the area for any remaining men who had chosen not to comply with the announcement, killing any that they found. As the stream of rounded up Arabs approached the school, Israeli soldiers are alleged to have taunted them, chanting "This one is a fedayee!" whilst aiming at them with their firearms. Throughout the long run to the school yard, sporadic shooting occurred, with several deaths occurring on the walk.

In the oral accounts collected years later, the procession eventually reached the wall which separated the school and street, the civilian men being made to line up against it. The group was then ordered to walk, hands against the wall, while being continuously shot at from fixed machine gun positions. The survivors of the latter shooting were made to walk through the school gate. As they entered the school, the male residents of Rafah were swung at by soldiers wielding heavy sticks and made to jump over a segment of barbed wire. Following this procedure, the group sat in the school yard.

Men continuously arrived in the school yard up until 11 AM. Eyewitnesses report being intimidated and humiliated by the soldiers. Those sitting in the courtyard were made to bow their heads to the ground whilst rifle fire flew one or two meters above them. Being kept put for an extended period of time, many were forced to relieve themselves in front of the whole group.

Outside the schoolyard, Israeli forces were actively searching the homes of the town, marking the walls of the searched homes with paint to indicate they had been searched. A separate group of Palestinian men, mainly older individuals, was being held on the outskirts of the town. Many of these men were released after questioning.

==== Screening operation ====
Upon the arrival of a few high-ranking Israeli officers, the soldiers were ordered to cease firing above the heads of the captive Arabs, who were allowed by the newly arrived officials to raise their heads. Following this, the Israelis questioned suspected Palestinian militants inside the school, referencing a list of names for the task. They also asked those not on their lists either to surrender or face death. Palestinian soldiers slowly stood in the crowd, and were encouraged by the Israeli soldiers to point out those among their ranks who had not stood. Eventually, every single member of the male populace, combatant or otherwise, was questioned by the Israelis. Confessed and suspected soldiers were rounded up on buses and transported to the Atlit detainee camp in northern Israel. After interrogations, in which collaborators' testimony could lead to summary executions, suspects were transported by bus to Atlit.

== Aftermath ==
The bodies of those killed were dumped in the Tell Zurub neighborhood on the western side of Rafah, where their families in defiance of the curfew, went to pick up the bodies of their kin and bury them. These burials took place without identification, making subsequent attempts to arrive at a precise figure for those killed difficult. Those incarcerated at Atlit were eventually repatriated. Israel, following threats of UN-imposed economic sanctions by US President Dwight D. Eisenhower, withdrew from the Gaza Strip on March 16, 1957. News of a Rafah massacre was quickly picked up by the foreign press, with The Times of London reporting that some 60 refugees had been killed. On November 28, Israeli Prime Minister David Ben-Gurion, in response to a question by a communist member of the Knesset, gave the official version of events. A riot had broken out in Rafah under Egyptian incitement and the UNRWA building was subject to an assault, and, in quelling the disturbance some 48 people were killed. As a result of foreign coverage, mass killings in the Gaza Strip came to an end, though Israel continued to employ summary executions. The chief of the United Nations Observer mission interpreted these actions as aiming at ridding the Gaza Strip of its refugee population.

=== United Nations report ===
On December 15, 1956, the Special Report of the Director of the United Nations Relief and Works Agency for Palestine Refugees in the Near East (UNRWA) Covering the Period 1 November 1956 to mid-December 1956 was presented to the General Assembly of the United Nations. The report, acknowledging the circumstances surrounding the slayings were questionable, reports a total of 111 casualties of the November 12 screening. This included 103 refugees, seven local residents, and one Egyptian. According to the Palestinian version, 197 were killed and a further 23 had disappeared. Israeli officers told UNRWA that the attitude towards the screening was "hostile," and a resistance to the operation by refugees was responsible for the casualties among their ranks. The Director's notes also discuss the Khan Yunis massacre, a similar screening operation in the village of Khan Yunis which had allegedly resulted in the deaths of at least 275 Palestinians eight days prior to the incident at Rafah.

=== Press coverage ===
In 2009, the incident at Rafah gained minor public interest when it was covered in the graphic novel Footnotes in Gaza, an eyewitness-reliant account of the Khan Yunis killings and Rafah killings by Maltese American comics journalist Joe Sacco.

== See also ==
- Khan Yunis massacre
- Kafr Qasim massacre, a similar incident which occurred on the eve of the Suez Crisis
