= 2024 in Palestine =

- Decades: 2000s; 2010s; 2020s
- See also: History of Palestine; Timeline of Palestinian history; List of years in Palestine

Events in the year 2024 in Palestine.

== Incumbents ==
Photo	Post	Name
	President (PLO)	Mahmoud Abbas
	Prime Minister	Mohammad Shtayyeh (until 31 March)
	Prime Minister	Mohammad Mustafa (starting 31 March)

- Government of Palestine – Eighteenth government of Palestine (until 31 March) and Nineteenth government of Palestine (starting 31 March)

== Events ==
Ongoing — Gaza war

=== January ===
- 1 January –
  - At least 20 rockets are fired by Hamas at Jerusalem and southern Israel.
  - The IDF withdraws seven brigades, consisting of thousands of soldiers, from the Gaza Strip and says the war will enter a "different mode of operations".
- 23 January – Twenty-one Israeli soldiers are killed in an explosion and subsequent building collapse in Khan Yunis in the Gaza Strip, making it the deadliest day for the IDF since the ground invasion began.
- 24 January – A building complex sheltering tens of thousands of displaced people in Khan Yunis catches fire after being hit by Israel, causing mass casualties. At least 214 people are killed in the city during the past 24 hours by Israeli airstrikes.

=== February ===
- 1 February – U.S. President Joe Biden signs an executive order imposing sanctions on four Israeli settlers in the West Bank who are implicated in acts of violence against Palestinians in the region.
- 3 February – The Gaza Health Ministry reports that 127 Palestinians (including at least 92 people in Rafah) were killed in Israeli attacks in the past 24 hours, bringing the death toll to 27,365.
- 9 February – Israeli prime minister Benjamin Netanyahu orders the IDF to plan evacuations of Rafah.
- 10 February – The IDF claims to have discovered a Hamas data center under UNRWA's Gaza Strip headquarters.
- 11 February – Hamas announces the death of two Israeli hostages and says that eight others have been seriously injured by Israeli airstrikes on the Gaza Strip in the past 96 hours.
- 12 February:
  - At least 67 people are killed during overnight Israeli airstrikes in Rafah.
  - Israeli special forces conduct a raid on a building in Rafah, rescuing two Israeli-Argentinian hostages.
  - The Supreme Court of the Netherlands orders a halt to exports of F-35 jet parts to Israel within seven days over serious violations of international humanitarian law.
- 14 February – The Hostages and Missing Families Forum files a complaint of war crimes against the leadership of Hamas at the International Criminal Court.
- 18 February – Israel's Channel 12 reports that Prime Minister Netanyahu will restrict Palestinian citizens of Israel's access to the al-Aqsa Mosque in Jerusalem during the month of Ramadan due to security concerns.
- 22 February –
  - One Israeli is killed and 10 others severely injured in a shooting attack by three Palestinians near Ma'aleh Adumim in the West Bank.
  - Forty people are killed and 100 others are injured in Israeli airstrikes against residential buildings in Deir al-Balah in the central Gaza Strip.
- 23 February – U.S. Secretary of State Antony Blinken declares that Israeli settlements in the West Bank are illegal under international law, overturning a policy adopted under former President Donald Trump.
- 25 February – Self-immolation of Aaron Bushnell: An active-duty United States Air Force soldier is critically injured after setting himself on fire outside the Israeli embassy in Washington, D.C., in solidarity with Palestinians and expressing his outrage over the Israeli invasion of the Gaza Strip. He dies of his injuries the next day.
- 26 February – 2024 Palestinian government collapse: The entire Palestinian government, including Prime Minister Mohammad Shtayyeh, resigns from office, amid popular opposition and pressure from the United States during the Gaza war. Prime Minister Mohammad Shtayyeh agrees to remain as caretaker prime minister until a new government is form.
- 29 February:
  - Flour massacre: At least 112 people receiving humanitarian aid are killed and 760 others are wounded in Gaza City after the IDF fires on civilians receiving humanitarian aid. Israeli officials claim most of the deaths were from a stampede.
  - Two Israelis are shot and killed in an attack at a gas station near Eli, West Bank.

=== March ===
- 7 March – U.S. president Joe Biden announces the construction of a temporary pier on the coast of the Gaza Strip to facilitate large-scale delivery of humanitarian aid.
- 8 March – Five people are killed when an aid package airdropped from a C-17 aircraft into the Gaza Strip fails to deploy its parachute and subsequently crushes them.
- 9 March – Canada and Sweden resume funding for UNRWA, which had been suspended following the UNRWA October 7 controversy.
- 18 March – Dozens of people, including at least 20 "terrorists" and a senior Hamas leader, are killed after an attack on the Al-Shifa Hospital in Gaza.
- 19 March – Israel announces the death of senior Hamas military leader Marwan Issa, following an airstrike on a tunnel complex the previous week, making him the highest ranking Hamas official killed in the war yet.
- 25 March – UN security council passes resolution calling for an immediate ceasefire in Gaza, as US abstains.
- 28 March – The International Court of Justice, in a unanimous decision, orders Israel to allow humanitarian aid to enter the Gaza Strip unimpeded, warning that famine is already occurring.
- 31 March – The nineteenth government of Palestine is sworn in, with Mohammad Mustafa becoming Prime Minister.

=== April ===
- 1 April – World Central Kitchen aid convoy attack: Seven volunteers from the World Central Kitchen, including six British, Polish, Australian and Palestinian nationals and a dual American-Canadian citizen, are killed in an Israeli airstrike south of Deir al-Balah.
- 7 April – Siege of Khan Yunis: Israeli forces withdraw from Khan Yunis.
- 8 April – Israeli prime minister Benjamin Netanyahu says he has ordered an invasion of Rafah with a date "being set" for the ground offensive.
- 10 April – An Israeli airstrike kills three sons of Hamas Chairman Ismail Haniyeh.
- 14 April – Killing of Benjamin Achimeir: The body of Israeli teenager Benjamin Achimeir is found in the West Bank a day after he went missing, sparking clashes between settlers and Palestinians.
- 16 April – A mob of Israeli settlers in Aqraba kill two Palestinians in revenge for the murder of Israeli teenager Benjamin Achimeir amid escalating ethnoreligious violence in the West Bank.
- 20 April – Fourteen Palestinians are killed in an Israeli raid in the West Bank.
- 21 April – 22 people are killed, including 18 children, in overnight Israeli strikes in Rafah, according to local health officials.
- 22 April – Israeli troops and tanks re-enter Khan Yunis after abruptly withdrawing from the city earlier in the month.
- 23 April –
  - A mass grave containing over 300 bodies is found at a hospital in Khan Yunis.
  - Jamaica becomes the 140th UN member state to recognize the State of Palestine.
- 25 April – Israel intensifies airstrikes on Rafah.

=== May ===
- 1 May – Following American pressure, Israel reopens the Erez Crossing and allows aid trucks into the northern part of the Gaza Strip.
- 2 May – A Palestinian National Security Forces patrol kills a Palestinian Islamic Jihad (PIJ) gunman in Tulkarm in the West Bank.
- 5 May –
  - Ten Israeli civilians are injured after Hamas launches a rocket barrage at the Kerem Shalom border crossing.
  - Hamas announces the end of ceasefire talks held in Cairo, Egypt, while Israel vows to continue its military operations.
- 6 May –
  - Israel tells Gazans to evacuate part of Rafah ahead of a planned ground offensive.
  - Hamas states that it has accepted the ceasefire proposal from Qatar and Egypt; Israel, however, rejects the proposal, saying it is "unacceptable".
- 7 May –
  - Israeli forces enter Rafah in a "limited" operation, taking control of the Rafah Border Crossing on the Egypt–Gaza border.
  - At least 27 people are killed by Israeli airstrikes in Rafah.
- 8 May –
  - Israeli troops reach the outskirts of Rafah with Hamas saying that heavy fighting is underway. The IDF says it has "uncovered terrorist infrastructure", and killed a number of Hamas militants as it advances.
  - Israel reopens the Kerem Shalom border crossing, allowing humanitarian aid into Gaza. However, no aid has entered according to the UN.
- 9 May –
  - Israeli tanks and warplanes strike eastern Rafah, killing more than 65 civilians and causing 80,000 people to flee.
  - A US-flagged ship carrying aid to the United States-built floating pier in Gaza sets sail from Cyprus.
- 10 May – Palestine 194: The United Nations General Assembly votes 143–9 with 25 abstentions to approve a resolution granting Palestine new rights and requests, and to reconsider its request to become a UN member. The US, Argentina, the Czech Republic and Hungary, along with four Pacific nations, align with Israel in voting against the resolution.
- 12 May – Antony Blinken warns Israel lacks a credible plan to protect Rafah civilians.
- 13 May –
  - The IDF advances into northern and southern Gaza.
  - A staff member of the United Nations Department of Safety and Security is killed and another is injured in Rafah.
  - Hamas says it has "lost contact" with the militants holding four Israeli hostages in the Gaza Strip, including Israeli-American Hersh Goldberg-Polin.
- 14 May – Israeli tanks enter residential areas of Rafah as they attempt to capture the city. Hamas' armed wing, the al-Qassam Brigades says that it destroyed an Israeli troop carrier with a Al-Yassin 105 anti-tank missile, killing several troops and injuring several others, while the IDF claims to have "eliminated" several militants in the city.
- 15 May – Five Israeli soldiers are killed in a friendly fire incident in Jabalia after IDF tanks open fire on their position.
- 16 May – Palestinian fighters, including Hamas and PIJ, claim dozens of attacks on Israeli troops in and around the Jabalia refugee camp.
- 17 May –
  - Humanitarian aid deliveries begin arriving at the Gaza floating pier.
  - The IDF recovers from Rafah the bodies of three people killed in the Nova music festival massacre in October 2023, including Shani Louk.
  - Hamas announces that an Israeli strike killed Sharhabil Sayed, a Hamas commander in Lebanon.
  - Israel announces that an IAF strike killed Islaam Hamaisa, a commander of the PIJ's Jenin Brigades.
- 18 May –
  - The IDF recovers the body of Ron Binyamin, who was killed and brought to Gaza by Palestinian militants in October 2023.
  - Benny Gantz threatens to withdraw his party from the unity coalition if Prime Minister Benjamin Netanyahu fails to submit a post-war plan for Gaza by June 8.
  - Austria unfreezes €3.4 million ($3.7 million) in funds to the UNRWA.
- 20 May – The Prosecutor of the International Criminal Court, Karim Khan requests a warrant for Israeli prime minister Benjamin Netanyahu, Israeli defence minister Yoav Gallant, Hamas chief Yahya Sinwar, Mohammed Deif, and Ismail Haniyeh for alleged war crimes and crimes against humanity.
- 21 May –
  - The IDF launches a raid on Jenin, with sources claiming seven Palestinians were killed.
  - UNRWA suspends food distribution in Rafah due to insecurity and a lack of supplies.
- 22 May – The governments of Norway, Ireland, and Spain announce they will recognise the State of Palestine as a sovereign state starting 28 May, calling for a two-state solution. In response, Israel recalls its ambassadors to these countries.
- 23 May – At least 60 Palestinians are killed in Israeli attacks in Rafah, Deir al-Balah, and Gaza City.
- 24 May –
  - The IDF the bodies of three captives who were killed and taken to Gaza by Palestinian militants in the 7 October attacks.
  - The International Court of Justice orders Israel to halt the military offensive in Rafah.
- 25 May – Italy restores €35 million (US$38 million) of funding for UNRWA several months after it suspended the aid due to allegations linking UN staff to the October 7 attacks.
- 26 May –
  - The Al-Qassam Brigades fire rockets towards Tel Aviv area in central Israel for the first time in four months.
  - Four U.S. Army vessels wash up on Israeli beaches, two of them in the Gaza Strip.
- 28 May –
  - The governments of Norway, Ireland, and Spain officially recognise the State of Palestine, after declaring their intention to do so on May 22. The Palestinian flag is raised outside of Leinster House, the seat of Ireland's parliament.
  - The Folketing of Denmark rejects a proposal to recognise a Palestinian state.
  - Israeli tanks reach central Rafah for the first time with heavy clashes being reported.
  - At least 21 people are killed and 64 others are injured in an Israeli attack on a tent camp in al-Mawasi, Rafah Governorate.
  - The U.S. removes the Gaza floating pier for repair after its flotilla was damaged in bad weather.
  - South Africa's genocide case against Israel: Mexico announces it will intervene in the genocide case on the side of South Africa.
- 30 May – The IDF lifts a ban on the sale of food to the Gaza Strip from Israel and the West Bank.

=== June ===
- 6 June –
  - At least 40 Palestinians, including fourteen children, are killed and more than 70 injured after an Israeli airstrike on a United Nations school in that was sheltering refugees in the Nuseirat refugee camp.
  - Three Palestinians are killed and several others are injured during an IDF raid on Jenin.
- 7 June –
  - UN advisors announce the intention of the organization to add Israel, Hamas and PIJ to their list of countries and armed groups that harm children in their upcoming "Children and Armed Conflict" report.
  - The United States reinstalls a temporary aid pier while the Gaza floating pier is being fixed due to weather damage.
- 8 June – Nuseirat operation: Four hostages kidnapped by Hamas and held in the Nuseirat refugee camp, including Noa Argamani, are rescued in an Israeli special operation.
- 11 June – United States Secretary of State Antony Blinken announced more than $400 million in new humanitarian aid for Palestinians in Gaza.
- 14 June –
  - The UN pauses humanitarian aid delivery at the US military-constructed Gaza floating pier pending investigations on whether it was involved in the Israeli raid on the Nuseirat refugee camp and on its security for humanitarian workers.
  - The United States military plans to temporarily dismantle the Gaza floating pier and move it to Israel following predictions of rough seas, halting its humanitarian aid shipments for the 3rd time in one month.
  - The United States State Department officially adds the Israeli group Tsav 9 to its list of sanctioned entities for impeding the delivery of humanitarian aid to the Gaza Strip.
- 15 June – Eight Israeli soldiers are killed in Rafah after their Namer armoured personnel carrier is hit by a massive explosion.
- 17 June – Eight Palestinians are killed by Israeli fire while waiting for commercial trucks in Gaza.
- 21 June –
  - Armenia officially recognises the State of Palestine.
  - Gaza health officials claim that Israeli strikes on refugee tent camps near Rafah kill at least 25, which is denied by an IDF spokesperson.
- 22 June – At least 42 Palestinians are killed by Israeli airstrikes in northern Gaza.
- 23 June – Eight Palestinians are killed in IDF airstrikes that hit a UNRWA-run vocational college in Gaza City that was being used to distribute aid.
- 24 June – Eleven Palestinians, including the director of Gaza's Ambulance and Emergency Department, are killed in Israeli airstrikes on the al-Shati refugee camp, Bani Suhaila, and Gaza City.
- 25 June – Israeli forces bomb Gaza where one strike kills 10 family members of Hamas political chief Ismail Haniyeh.
- 26 June – An Israeli airstrike on a home in Beit Lahia in North Gaza Governorate kills at least 15 Palestinians.
- 28 June – The U.S. military dismantles the Gaza floating pier for the third time due to bad weather.
- 30 June – At least six Palestinians are killed in Rafah, as Israeli tanks re-enter Shuja'iyya and parts of northern Gaza, displacing more than 60,000 people.

=== July ===
- 1 July – The IDF orders a mass evacuation of Palestinians from the entire eastern half of Khan Yunis and surrounding areas in anticipation of a new ground assault on the city.
- 2 July –
  - An IDF airstrike kills at least nine people in Khan Yunis, hours after Israel ordered a mass evacuation.
  - A dozen resigned United States government officials release a joint statement denouncing the Biden administration for its "undeniable complicity" in war crimes against Palestinian civilians by violating U.S. laws to continue sending Israel weapons.
- 3 July – The Israeli government approves the seizure of 12.7 square kilometers (4.9 square miles) of Palestinian land in the Jordan Valley, representing the largest land grab in the West Bank in more than three decades.
- 4 July – Israel approves the construction of 5,295 Israeli settler homes in dozens of settlements in the West Bank.
- 5 July – At least seven Palestinians are killed during an IDF raid in Jenin that targeted a building that several militants had barricaded themselves in.
- 6 July – At least 16 Palestinians are killed by an Israeli strike on a school housing Palestinians displaced from ongoing military operations in the Nuseirat refugee camp.
- 7 July – Israeli strikes across Gaza kill at least 27 Palestinians. In Gaza City, four are killed in a strike on a UNRWA school sheltering displaced people and six others are killed in a strike on a house. Two people are killed in the Sabra neighbourhood, with six others in a strike on a residential building in Az-Zawayda.
- 8 July – A study by The Lancet estimates that the death toll from the conflict is at least 186,000 Palestinians, around 8% of Gaza's pre-war population.
- 9 July –
  - July 9, 2024 Gaza attacks: At least 50 Palestinians are killed and dozens more are injured in Israeli attacks on Tel al-Hawa, Sabra, and Shuja'iyya, Gaza City.
  - Al-Awda School massacre: At least 29 Palestinians are killed in an Israeli attack targeting the entrance of a UNRWA-run school sheltering displaced Palestinians, becoming Israel's fourth attack on Gaza schools in the past four days.
  - UN human rights experts accuse Israel of carrying out a "targeted starvation campaign" that resulted in child malnutrition and death in Gaza.
  - U.S. military officials announce that the Gaza floating pier will be permanently removed after being reinstalled for a few more days.
- 10 July – The IDF orders a complete evacuation of all Palestinians from Gaza City to travel south in advance of a new offensive on Hamas targets.
- 11 July – The United States Department of State and Department of the Treasury announce sanctions against three violent Israeli settlers who blocked humanitarian aid to Gaza and four illegal Israeli settlement outposts, and also blacklists the far-right Jewish supremacist organization Lehava.
- 12 July – Gaza City rescue crews discover at least 60 Palestinian bodies in the Tel al-Hawa and Sabra districts following a week of attacks on Gaza City by Israeli forces.
- 13 July –
  - 13 July 2024 al-Mawasi attack: At least 90 Palestinians are killed and 300 injured in a strike on the al-Mawasi humanitarian zone, in what the IDF states was a targeted strike against Al-Qassam Brigades leader Mohammed Deif.
  - July 2024 al-Shati refugee camp attack: At least twenty people are killed by IDF shelling on a prayer hall in the al-Shati refugee camp during Zuhr prayer.
- 14 July –
  - At least 17 Palestinians are killed and 80 others are injured in overnight Israeli strikes on a UN-run school used to shelter displaced people in the Nuseirat refugee camp.
  - Palestinians in several cities in the occupied West Bank enact a general strike in protest against the 13 July Israeli strike on al-Mawasi.
- 15 July –
  - At least 12 Palestinians are killed in Israeli airstrikes on Gaza City and Deir al-Balah.
  - Several Palestinian factions, including Fatah and Hamas, schedule reconciliatory meetings in China in an attempt to end their ongoing political disputes.
- 16 July –
  - At least 57 Palestinians are killed by Israeli bombardment in Rafah, Khan Yunis, and parts of Gaza City.
  - An investigation by the Associated Press and Israeli investigative organization Shomrim finds that the United States and Israel allowed tax-deductible donations totaling over US$200,000 to multiple Israeli far-right extremist groups involved in blocking and disrupting humanitarian aid delivery to the Gaza Strip.
- 17 July – At least 42 Palestinians are killed and more than 70 others are injured in Israeli strikes on a United Nations-run school in the Nuseirat refugee camp and on a designated "safe zone" in al-Mawasi.
- 18 July –
  - The Knesset votes 68-9 in favor of a resolution describing a Palestinian state as "an existential danger to the State of Israel".
  - Both the Gaza Health Ministry and the Israeli Health Ministry report traces of type 2 polio in Gaza's sewage system, caused by "severe overcrowding" and Israel's blockade of hygiene products from entering the enclave.
  - At least five Palestinians are killed and fifteen others are injured in Israeli airstrikes on the Nuseirat and Bureij refugee camps in the Gaza Strip.
- 19 July –
  - The International Court of Justice rules that Israel's land annexation and settlement construction in East Jerusalem and the West Bank is unlawful, and demands an end to these practices "as soon as possible". The Court also rules that Israel's occupation in the West Bank amounts to apartheid.
  - The United Kingdom announces the resumption of funding to the United Nations UNRWA agency.
  - The European Commission announces loans and grants totaling €400 million (US$435.5 million) to the Palestinian Authority to prevent the government's financial collapse.
  - The UN reports that "anarchy" and societal breakdown is expanding across the Gaza Strip due to IDF destabilization, citing an increase in looting and extrajudicial killings of police and humanitarian workers.
- 20 July – At least 37 Palestinians are killed and 54 are injured in Israeli airstrikes across the Gaza Strip, with the confirmed death toll surpassing 38,900 people.
- 22 July –
  - Israel orders mandatory evacuations across the Gaza Strip, including sections of the heavily populated Al-Mawasi humanitarian zone.
  - At least 70 Palestinians are killed and more than 200 others are injured by Israeli tank shelling and airstrikes in Khan Yunis Governorate.
  - The Israeli parliament votes in favor of classifying UNRWA as a terrorist organization, allowing the motion to undergo supplementary deliberation regarding Israel severing relations with the agency.
- 23 July – 2024 Beijing Declaration: Various factions in the Palestinian government, including rivals Fatah and Hamas, sign a declaration in Beijing, China, to end their divisions and form a unity government.
- 26 July:
  - A Palestinian governmental body announces that senior Hamas leader Mustafa Muhammad Abu Ara has died in Israeli prison after being arrested in October 2023.
  - The Saint Hilarion Monastery/Tell Umm Amer complex in the Gaza Strip is designated as a World Heritage Site in Danger by UNESCO.
  - Confrontations erupt in Tulkarm after the Palestinian Authority's security forces allegedly attempt to arrest the hospitalized militant Abu Shujaa, leader of the Tulkarm Brigade.
  - Khadija School airstrike:
- 27 July – More than fifty people, including fifteen children, are killed in Israeli attacks on a school used to shelter displaced people in Deir al-Balah in the Gaza Strip.
- 29 July – Far-right Israeli protestors, including several members of the Knesset, storm the Sde Teiman detention camp after the IDF detained nine reservists on suspicion of abusing a Palestinian detainee.
- 30 July – 2024 Gaza Strip polio epidemic: The World Health Organization reports that it is now "very likely" that poliovirus has infected Gazan citizens and is spreading among the population. The statement was released shortly after the Gaza Health Ministry declared a polio epidemic in the territory.
- July 31 –
  - Ismail Haniyeh, the head of Hamas, is assassinated in Iran. Israel admits responsibility for the killing on 23 December.
  - Al Jazeera Arabic journalist Ismail al-Ghoul and his cameraman Rami al-Refee are killed during an Israeli airstrike during a coverage near Ismail Haniyeh's home in the Gaza Strip.

=== August ===
- 1 August –
  - Israel claims to have verified that it assassinated Hamas military commander Mohammed Deif in the 13 July 2024 al-Mawasi attack.
  - At least fifteen Palestinians are killed and 29 others are injured in an Israeli strike on a school in the Shuja'iyya neighborhood of Gaza City.
- 3 August – At least fifteen people are killed in an Israeli attack on a school sheltering displaced people in the Sheikh Radwan neighbourhood of Gaza City.
- 4 August – At least three people are killed and 18 others are wounded in Israeli bombings on al-Aqsa Hospital in Deir al-Balah.
- 5 August – Israel returns 89 decomposed, unidentifiable Palestinian bodies to the Gaza Ministry of Health.
- 6 August –
  - Yahya Sinwar is named as the new political leader of Hamas, replacing Ismail Haniyeh.
  - Palestinian President Mahmoud Abbas announces a visit to Moscow, Russia, from 12–14 August to discuss with President Vladimir Putin the peace process for the Gaza war and to "strengthen bilateral relations in all areas" between the two nations.
- 7 August –
  - The IDF confirms the death of Bilha Yinon, the last person missing in Israel following the October 7 attack by Hamas.
  - Six Palestinians are killed in an Israeli raid on the Maghazi refugee camp and in Khan Yunis.
- 9 August –
  - Israeli troops launch a new assault on Khan Yunis, with airstrikes killing at least 21 Palestinians and Israeli troops initiating ground operations in the city for the third time since the war's beginning.
  - Samer al-Hajj, a Hamas security official for the Ain al-Hilweh Palestinian refugee camp, is assassinated by an Israeli drone strike in Sidon, Lebanon.
- 10 August – Al-Tabaeen school attack: Israeli rockets strike a school in Gaza City, killing over 100 Palestinians and injuring dozens.
- 12 August – August 2024 Khan Unis incursion: Ten Palestinians are killed in an Israeli airstrike on a residential home in Khan Yunis.
- 13 August – Crowds led by far-right Israeli security minister Itamar Ben-Gvir storm the Al-Aqsa Mosque and several villages in the West Bank on Tisha B'av. Israel Police officers reportedly offer protection to Israeli settlers, while the United States and the United Nations denounce the raids.
- 14 August – Top Hamas official Osama Hamdan states that the organization is "losing faith" in the United States' role as mediator in Israel–Hamas ceasefire proposals due to the U.S. not applying pressure on Israel to act in good faith, and threatens to withdraw from future U.S.-mediated negotiations.
- 15 August – The Gaza Health Ministry reports that over 40,000 Palestinians in the Gaza Strip have been killed due to the ongoing Israeli invasion and blockade. The ministry reported that 16,456 fatalities were children, and that 10,000 people not included in the total were still missing.
- 16 August – The first confirmed case of polio in the Gaza Strip since 1999 is discovered in a 10-month-old child in Deir al-Balah.
- 17 August –
  - Israeli officials state that they are attempting to "lower expectations" of a ceasefire deal due to significant gaps between Israel and Hamas demands, after US president Joe Biden stated that he was "optimistic" about US-mediated negotiation progress in Qatar.
  - Fifteen people from the same family are killed during an airstrike against their home in Az-Zawayda.
  - Two senior Hamas militants are killed in an Israeli airstrike in Jenin.
- 20 August –
  - The IDF recovers the bodies of six hostages held in the Gaza Strip by Hamas.
  - At least twelve Palestinians, including two children, are killed in an Israeli airstrike on a school used to shelter displaced people in Gaza City.
- 22 August –
  - Eleven Palestinians are killed and six others are injured in an Israeli strike on a residential building in Beit Lahia.
  - An Israeli drone strike kills three Palestinians in Tulkarm, during a raid where IDF soldiers set fire to civilian homes and used bulldozers to destroy residential areas.
- 24 August – Hamas refuses any ceasefire conditions that allow Israel to hold onto the Rafah Crossing and the Philadelphi Corridor, and accuses the United States of spreading false optimism to support Democratic nominee Kamala Harris's presidential campaign instead of implementing constructive diplomatic measures.
- 25 August – At least 71 people are killed and 112 others are injured in Israeli attacks in the Gaza Strip.
- 27 August –
  - The IDF says commandos have rescued from an underground tunnel in Gaza Qaid Farhan Al-Qadi, a Negev Bedouin hostage who was kidnapped by Hamas during the 7 October attack on Israel.
  - Palestinian parties declare a general strike in Tulkarm Governorate in protest of the recent killings by the IDF.
  - Five Palestinians are killed in an Israeli airstrike on the Nur Shams refugee camp in the West Bank. Separately, a Palestinian man is killed and six other people are injured in an attack by Israeli settlers in the Wadi Rahal village.
- 28 August –
  - The IDF launches a major military operation in the West Bank, mainly in Jenin and Tulkarm, with at least nine Palestinians killed and several others injured. The Al-Israa Specialised Hospital and the Thabet Thabet Governmental Hospital are surrounded, and ambulances are blocked from entering.
  - Three Palestinian fighters and one Hezbollah militant are killed in a drone strike against a vehicle at a checkpoint on the Lebanon–Syria border.
  - The United States Department of State imposes sanctions on Israeli settler group Hashomer Yosh and a civilian security coordinator for the Yitzhar settlement for settler violence against Palestinians in the West Bank.
- 29 August –
  - Mohammed "Abu Shujaa" Jaber, the leader of the Tulkarm Brigade, is killed during an Israeli attack against the Nur Shams refugee camp in Tulkarm. Four other militants are also killed.
  - The number of Palestinians killed since the beginning of the operation on 27 August increases to 18, while dozens are wounded and at least 20 more arrested.
  - The IDF carries out an airstrike on a humanitarian aid convoy in Gaza that kills five workers.
  - Israel and Hamas agree to three separate three-day humanitarian pauses to allow the World Health Organization to vaccinate more than 600,000 children against polio in the Gaza Strip.
- 30 August – Three Palestinian fighters, including Jenin Brigades leader Wissam Hazem, are killed in a drone strike inside a refugee camp in Jenin. Separately, an Israeli soldier is killed and others injured during a bomb explosion in the city.
- 31 August –
  - Israeli strikes kill at least 48 people in the Gaza Strip.
  - The IDF recovers the bodies of six hostages kidnapped during the October 7 attacks, including Israeli-American citizen Hersh Goldberg-Polin, from an underground tunnel near Rafah.

=== September ===
- 1 September – Three Israeli police officers are killed during a shooting on a road in Tarqumiyah.
- 3 September –
  - The World Health Organization announces that its polio vaccination campaign in the Gaza Strip has "surpassed the target" of 156,500 projected vaccinations within two days.
  - The United States Department of Justice charges Hamas leader Yahya Sinwar and five other militants with conspiracy to provide material support for terrorism, conspiracy to murder Americans, and five other counts each.
- 5 September – Six people are killed and another is wounded during an Israeli airstrike on a vehicle in Tubas. Separately, a teenager is shot dead in the city by Israeli soldiers.
- 6 September –
  - Turkish-American activist Ayşenur Ezgi Eygi is shot dead by Israeli soldiers during an anti-Israeli settlement protest in Beita, Nablus.
  - At least 27 Palestinians are killed by Israeli airstrikes in cities across the Gaza Strip, including in the Nuseirat refugee camp.
- 9 September – At least eight people are killed and dozens are wounded in Israeli strikes across the Gaza Strip, bringing the confirmed Palestinian death toll to over 41,000.
- 10 September –
  - At least 40 people are killed and over 60 are injured during an Israeli airstrike in Al-Mawasi, according to Hamas. Twenty tents for displaced people are hit during the attack. The IDF claims that it struck senior Hamas commanders who were operating in a command center embedded inside a designated humanitarian area. They are later named as Samer Abu Daqqa, the head of Hamas’s aerial forces; Osama Tabash, the head of surveillance and targets in Hamas’s intelligence division; and Ayman Mabhouh, another senior Hamas officer. All three were directly involved in the October 7 attack, according to the IDF.
- 11 September –
  - Five Palestinians are killed by an Israeli drone strike in Tubas.
  - Six UNRWA staffers are killed in Israeli airstrikes on a school in central Gaza.
  - An IAF UH-60 Black Hawk helicopter crashes in Rafah during a mission to evacuate an injured combat engineer, killing two personnel on board.
- 12 September – The death toll from Israel's military operation in the West Bank increases to 50, with three people killed after a drone strike in Tulkarm.
- 16 September – At least 16 Palestinians are killed and at least thirteen others are wounded in Israeli airstrikes across the Gaza Strip, including several houses in Gaza City and the Nuseirat refugee camp.
- 17 September – A poll by the Palestinian Center for Policy and Survey Research finds that a majority of Gazan public opinion does not support Hamas's decision to launch October 7 attack on Israel for the first time during the conflict.
- 18 September – The United Nations General Assembly votes 124–14 with 43 abstentions to demand that Israel end its unlawful presence in the occupied Palestinian territories within the next 12 months.
- 19 September – Six Palestinians are killed and 18 others are injured in an IDF raid in Qabatiya in the West Bank.
- 21 September – At least 22 people are killed and 30 others are injured in an Israeli airstrike on a school in the Zeitoun area of Gaza City.
- 22 September –
  - At least seven people are killed in an Israeli airstrike on the Kafr Qasim school on the Al-Shati refugee camp in the Gaza Strip.
  - Israeli forces raid and order the closure of the offices of Al Jazeera Arabic in Ramallah.
- 27 September – Palestinian gunmen in the Gaza Strip shoot and kill an aid worker from a United States-based charity, firing on her car in what government officials say was a case of mistaken identity.

=== October ===
- 1 October –
  - October 2024 Iranian strikes against Israel: A Palestinian national is killed by a missile near Jericho.
  - 2024 Jaffa shooting: Palestinian gunmen open fire on a light rail train station in Jaffa, killing seven people. The two suspects are killed, while the Al-Qassam Brigades claims responsibility.
- 2 October –
  - Israeli strikes kill 51 people in southern Gaza.
  - The US imposes sanctions against the Israeli settler group Hilltop Youth and two other Israelis for attacks on Palestinians in the West Bank.
  - Israel introduces new customs regulations and restrictions on humanitarian aid deliveries into the Gaza Strip, significantly impeding food and essential supply delivery via the Jordan route.
- 3 October –
  - An Israeli airstrike kills Aziz Salha, known for his role in the 2000 Ramallah lynching, in central Gaza.
  - The IDF announces that it killed Rawhi Mushtaha, the head of the Hamas government in Gaza, along with Sameh al-Siraj and Sami Oudeh, who were responsible for security in Hamas in an airstrike in July.
  - A Yazidi woman is freed from Gaza in an operation involving the United States and Israel, the woman was kidnapped from her home in Iraq aged 11 and sold and trafficked to Gaza. Her captor was recently killed presumably from an Israeli airstrike allowing her to escape and seek repatriation.
  - The IAF launches an airstrike on Tulkarm, reportedly killing at least 16 people.
- 11 October – At least 20 Palestinians are killed and dozens of others are injured by Israeli airstrikes on the Jabalia refugee camp.
- 13 October – An Israeli attack on a school used to shelter displaced Palestinians kills at least 22 people, including fifteen children, in the Nuseirat refugee camp.
- 16 October – Israeli forces kill Yahya Sinwar, chairman of the Hamas political bureau, during an encounter in Rafah.
- 28 October – The Israeli Knesset passes legislation designating the United Nations Relief and Works Agency for Palestine Refugees in the Near East (UNRWA) as a "terrorist organization", which will take effect "within 90 days".

=== November ===
- 21 November – The International Criminal Court issues arrest warrants for Benjamin Netanyahu, Yoav Gallant and Hamas military commander Mohammed Deif for war crimes committed during the Gaza war.
- 29 November – Eight people are injured in a gun attack on a bus near the Israeli settlement of Ariel in the West Bank that is claimed by the al-Qassam Brigades.

=== December ===
- 14 December – Deiab al-Jaro, the mayor of Deir al-Balah, is killed along with nine others in an Israeli airstrike on his office.

== Deaths ==
- January 2: Saleh al-Arouri, 57, militant, commander of the Izz ad-Din al-Qassam Brigades (since 1993)
- January 29: Hind Rajab, 5, child
- February 25: Fathi Ghaben, 77, painter
- March 11: Mohammed Barakat, 39, footballer (national team)
- March 17: Marwan Issa, 58, militant, co-leader of the Izz ad-Din al-Qassam Brigades
- April 7: Walid Daqqa, 62, novelist and activist
- April 19: Mohammed Jaber, 24–25, militant, leader of the Tulkarm Brigade
- May 7: Walid Daqqa, 62, novelist and activist
- May 13: Talal Abu Zarifa, communist militant and politician (Democratic Front for the Liberation of Palestine)
- June 11: Majed Abu Maraheel, 61, Olympic long-distance runner (1996)
- July 7: Ihab al-Ghussein, 45, politician (Hamas) and spokesman of the Interior Ministry
- July 26: Mustafa Muhammad Abu Ara, 63, militant (Hamas).
- July 31:
  - Ismail Haniyeh, 61, politician (Hamas).
  - Ismail al-Ghoul, 27, journalist (Al Jazeera).
- August 9: Samer al-Hajj, security official (Hamas)
- August 22: Faruq al-Qaddumi, 93, politician.
- August 29: Abu Shujaa, 26, militant, leader of the Tulkarm Brigade (since 2022)
- August 30: Wissam Hazem, militant, leader of Hamas in Jenin
- September 2: Rashad Abu Sakhila, 23, actor and poet
- September 29: Fatah Sharif, militant (Hamas) and UNRWA officer
- October 16: Yahya Sinwar, 61, politician, Hamas chief in the Gaza Strip (2017–2024) and chairman of the Hamas political bureau (since 2024)

== See also ==
- Outline of the Gaza war
- Timeline of the Israeli–Palestinian conflict in 2024
