= Palestinian Authority–West Bank militias conflict =

Insurgency in the West Bank

- Part of Palestinian internal political violence and the Iran–Israel proxy conflict
Date	7 January 2022 – present (4 years, 9 months, 3 weeks and 3 days)
Location	West Bank, Palestine
Status	Ongoing: Escalation in clashes during the Gaza war

Belligerents
Palestinian Authority; Fatah leadership	Palestinian Islamic Jihad; Al-Aqsa Martyrs' Brigades; Hamas; (Palestine) Lions' Den

Units involved
Palestinian Security Services; Palestinian National Security Forces; General Intelligence Service; Palestinian Preventive Security; Palestinian Presidential Guard; Palestinian Civil Police Force	(Palestine) Palestinian Joint Operations Room; (Palestinian Islamic Jihad) (Fatah) (Hamas) Jenin Brigades; (Palestinian Islamic Jihad) (Fatah) (Hamas) Tulkarm Brigade; (Palestinian Islamic Jihad) (Fatah) (Hamas) Nablus Brigade; (Palestinian Islamic Jihad) (Fatah) (Hamas) Nur Shams Brigade; (Palestinian Islamic Jihad) Ramallah Brigade; (Fatah) Khalil al-Rahman Brigade; (Palestinian Islamic Jihad) (Hamas) Tubas Brigade; (Palestinian Islamic Jihad) (Hamas) Qabatiya Brigade; Other militant units

Casualties and losses
3 security officers killed 5 security officers injured 2 intelligence officers killed 1 presidential guard killed 3 police officers injured	9+ militants killed 20+ militants injured 81 militants arrested
- 15+ Palestinian civilians killed 22+ Palestinian civilians injured

In the Israeli-occupied West Bank, various local Palestinian militias have been engaged in an armed conflict with the Palestinian Authority (PA), the autonomous administration governing the region's Palestinian enclaves. The conflict emerged a result of the widespread unpopularity of the PA among Palestinians and the common perception that it is a collaborationist body subservient to Israel, the occupying power. In turn, the PA accuses militants of being "bandits" and agents of instability.

The widespread discontent with the Palestinian Authority, along with multiple factors related to the Israeli–Palestinian conflict, sparked a mass spread of West Bank Palestinian militancy in the 2020s. Initially rare, armed clashes between the PA's National Security Forces and local militias began significantly escalating during the ongoing Gaza war. In December 2024, the largest and most violent fighting in the conflict erupted with a large-scale PA operation in Jenin.

== Origins ==
=== Palestinian Authority loss of legitimacy ===
Israel has occupied the Palestinian territories (the West Bank and the Gaza Strip) since 1967. After decades of conflict, the Fatah-controlled Palestinian Authority was created in 1994 following the agreements of the Oslo Accords between the Palestine Liberation Organization (PLO) and Israel. Under the agreements, the PA was allowed to exercise partial civil control over the West Bank's Palestinian enclaves and over the Gaza Strip.

The Second Intifada of 2000–2005 saw the PA security forces directly engaging in combat against the Israel Defense Forces (IDF). However, after Mahmoud Abbas came to power as president of the Palestinian Authority in 2005, the PA shifted towards authoritarianism and into a role of effective subcontractor to the Israeli occupation, and its security forces were restructured under United States training led by General Keith Dayton.

The PA administration over the Gaza Strip effectively ended in 2007 following the Battle of Gaza, which ended with Hamas controlling the Gaza Strip and setting up a separate government. That same year, Abbas signed a decree banning all militias; the Al-Aqsa Martyrs' Brigades, the armed wing of Fatah, became effectively independent, but continues to be politically aligned with Fatah despite its rejection by the party's leadership.

Compared to the Second Intifada, less militant violence occurred over the following years.

=== 2021–2022 rise in militancy ===
In 2022, a significant "proliferation" of new armed groups in the West Bank was observed. This spread of militancy has been attributed to a variety of factors:

- The 2021 Sheikh Jarrah evictions in East Jerusalem and the 2021 Israel–Palestine crisis, and popular anger over the inaction of the PA during these events.
- The start of the Israeli "Operation Break the Wave" in March 2022, involving more than 2,000 IDF raids into the West Bank and killing more than 200 people.
- Heightened Israeli settler violence.
- The November 2022 Israeli election, which returned Benjamin Netanyahu to power as the prime minister of Israel and as head of a far-right government (described as the most right-wing in Israeli history), which oversaw an escalation in raids into the West Bank.
- Continued mass discontent with the general weakness and complicity of the Palestinian Authority in the Israeli occupation.

Between 2021 and 2022, several new Palestinian militias in the West Bank were formed, including the Jenin Brigades, the Tulkarm Brigade, the Nablus Brigade, the Tubas Brigade, and Lions' Den. By the end of 2022, Palestinian militias, many operating at least nominally under Palestinian Islamic Jihad (PIJ), had a heavy presence across the West Bank, and exerted de facto control over the Jenin refugee camp, the Tulkarm refugee camp, and the Nablus refugee camp.

== Timeline ==
=== 2022 ===
On 7 January 2022, the first documented armed clashes between militants and PA forces took place in Jenin and in the Balata refugee camp amid activists' protests against the PA. These were sparked by the violent arrest of Ahmed Zubeidi, son of Zakari Zubeidi, by PA police officers in Jenin. A local militia commander said in response to the events that his men "would not remain silent" if PA forces continued to target the refugee camp.

On 19 September 2022, militants and security forces clashed in Nablus after the security forces arrested Musab Shtayyeh, a leader of Lions' Den and Hamas member. Following more than 24 hours of fighting, both sides agreed to a ceasefire, with the PA saying it would not prosecute Shtayyeh.

=== 2023 ===
Following an IDF raid into Jenin from 3 to 4 July 2023, PA security forces launched a crackdown on PIJ in the city in the following days, detaining several militants. On 16 July, security forces launched a raid into the town of Jaba', south of Jenin, against PIJ militants. The Al-Quds Brigades released a statement condemning the actions of the PA, and the Jenin Brigades called for mass demonstrations.

On 1 August 2023, security forces arrested two gunmen in Jaba', after which militants attacked the headquarters of the Jenin Governorate and clashed with security forces; clashes spread to the Jenin refugee camp, where security forces engaged in exchanges of fire with militants and stormed a local hospital. As the clashes were occurring, local mosques called on the PA through loudspeakers to release detained militants. On 30 August, clashes between militants and security forces erupted in Tulkarm after security forces tried to remove barricades placed by fighters to obstruct IDF raids.

=== 2024 ===
In early January 2024, the Jenin Brigades claimed that the PA security forces assassinated two militants.

In February, militant forces in Tubas were deployed to confront an IDF raid, but were themselves confronted and pushed back by PA security forces.

On 2 March, security forces attempted to arrest a militant in the Jenin refugee camp, who managed to escape; this was followed by several hours of clashes between security forces and militants in the camp. On 30 March, clashes erupted between PA security forces and militants in Nour Shams Camp, with militants targeting the headquarters of Tulkarm Governorate during the fighting; one militant was shot and later died from his injuries on 2 April.

On 2 May, security forces killed a PIJ militant affiliated with the Tulkarm Brigade and the Nur Shams Brigade in Tulkarm.

A major escalation in the conflict between the Palestinian Authority and the militias occurred in late July 2024. Protestors and militants clashed with security forces in Tulkarm, Jenin, Bethlehem, Tubas, and Nablus. Both sides accused each other of wanting to start a civil war.

On 15 August 2024, security forces in Jenin detonated an explosive planted by Hamas before it could be used against Israeli forces. Following this, Hamas released a statement condemning the Palestinian Authority and claiming it was constantly targeting militants, confiscating weapons, dismantling explosives, and interfering with ambushes during Israeli incursions. On 27 August 2024, the security forces arrested a militant in Nablus.

On 9 September, renewed fighting broke out between militants and security forces in the Jenin refugee camp after the latter dismantled an explosive near the camp entrance. On 17 September, there were clashes after the security forces' arrest of a militant in Jenin. The security forces also dismantled explosives in Kafr Dan near Jenin and attacked local civilians who came out to protest against their actions. On 23 September, security forces arrested three militants in the Nur Shams camp, leading to subsequent exchanges of gunfire. On 30 September, security forces pursued and shot militants in Tubas, leading to clashes between the two sides.

On 1 October, security forces in Nablus shot at and unsuccessfully pursued a local militant, who was killed hours later by the IDF during one of their raids into the city. Beginning on 8 October, the PA began an operation against the Tubas Brigade that lasted throughout the month. On 11 October, fighting was reported between security forces and militants in Silat Al-Harithiya, west of Jenin; fighters also targeted the PA headquarters in Jenin with gunfire.

On 4 November, PA security forces discovered and seized a rocket in the village of Budrus, near Ramallah, pointed in the direction of Israel, and are expected to hand it over to the IDF. On 5 November, security forces in Tubas seized and detonated an explosive planted by militants that had been planted to target raiding IDF soldiers. On 27 November, a militant stabbed two PA security officers in Hebron.

On 3 December, PA security forces opened fire on a grouping of militants in Tulkarm. On 5 December, PA security forces launched an operation against the Jenin Brigades, which marked the largest and most violent confrontation that the PA has had with West Bank militants, with analysts referring to it as "the most fierce" inter-Palestinian fighting since the 2007 Battle of Gaza. Clashes between militants and security forces in response to the events in Jenin were also reported in Nablus and Tulkarm on 10 December 2024, and in Tammoun, south of Tubas, on 24 December 2024.

=== 2025 ===
On 7 January 2025, three militants, including a founder of the Tulkarm Brigade, were wounded after PA forces opened fire on their vehicle in Attil, north of Tulkarm. A similar PA attack against militants in Tulkarm occurred again on 12 January. PA forces suspended their Jenin operation as the IDF entered the city and launched its own raid on 21 January. The next day, however, PA forces resumed attacks in Jenin, fighting alongside the IDF for the first ever time. In Yabad, west of Jenin, on 24 January, PA forces arrested and beat up a number of militants; they also joined the IDF in minor raids in Ramallah, Tulkarm, Hebron, and Qalqilya.

On 10 March, PA forces killed the prominent Jenin Brigades militant Abdul Rahman Abu Al-Muna.

On 22 July, the PA's Preventive Security Force reportedly arrested an entire militant cell in Nablus, which possessed a number of explosive devices intended for use against Israeli forces.

On 16 September, PA security forces captured militants who were preparing to launch a rocket from the village of Niama, Ramallah Governorate.

=== 2026 ===
On 15 February, PA security forces opened fire on the car of Samer Samara, a fugitive militant, outside Tammun, killing his two children and arresting him.

== Analysis ==
=== Tactics of the Palestinian Authority ===
The security coordination between Israel and the Palestinian Authority has been argued to be most visibly reflected in the so-called "revolving door" policy, in which militants and activists arrested by the PA security forces are "released" to be subsequently arrested by the Israeli authorities, and vice versa. The "revolving door" policy is said to highlight the shared interests of both the PA and Israel in suppressing the militias.

The Palestinian Authority has also sought to associate militants with criminality, with officials making unfounded accusations that many of the militants are from criminal backgrounds, and even sending impersonators of militants to exhort money from businesses as to tarnish their reputations. Collaborators are also recruited through offers of jobs in the security forces and with money.

=== Militants' attitudes ===
While typically condemning the attacks of the security forces in public statements, the militias have also repeatedly attempted to present themselves as desiring to avoid confrontation with the Palestinian Authority in the name of Palestinian unity, despite the reality of the conflict, and focus solely on Israel. Hamas has additionally stated that the PA security forces are meant to defend the Palestinian people against the IDF, and must start doing so.

== See also ==
- Fatah–Hamas conflict, a related inter-Palestinian conflict
- Palestinian political violence
