= Nur Shams Brigade =

- كتيبة نور شمس
- Dates active: 2022–present
- Country: Palestine
- Headquarters: Nur Shams
- Ideology: Palestinian self-determination Palestinian nationalism Anti-Zionism; Anti-apartheid; Anti-imperialism
- Part of: Al-Quds Brigades; Al-Aqsa Martyrs' Brigades (Hamas) Al-Qassam Brigades
- Wars: Israeli–Palestinian conflict; Israeli incursions in the West Bank during the Gaza war; Palestinian Authority–West Bank militias conflict; July 2024 West Bank unrest

The Nur Shams Brigade or Nur Shams Battalion (Arabic: كتيبة نور شمس, romanized: Katībat Nur Shams) is a Palestinian militia in the West Bank that operates in the Nur Shams refugee camp. It operates as a branch of the Al-Quds Brigades, the armed wing of Palestinian Islamic Jihad (PIJ), but also encompasses militants from the Al-Aqsa Martyrs' Brigades and the Al-Qassam Brigades of Hamas.

== History ==
The Nur Shams Brigade was reportedly founded in 2022, following the Israeli assassination of the militant Saif Abu Libda in April of that year. Abu Libda "is said to have played a key role in laying down the foundations of the group."

On 2 May 2024, Palestinian Authority (PA) security forces killed a PIJ militant affiliated with the Tulkarm Brigade and the Nur Shams Brigade in Tulkarm.

On 30 June 2024, Israeli forces assassinated Saaed Ezzat Jaber, one of the commanders of the militia, in an airstrike on Nur Shams.

The Nur Shams Brigade participated in the July 2024 West Bank unrest, targeting the local headquarters of the PA security forces in the Tulkarm refugee camp following their alleged attempt to arrest Tulkarm Brigade commander Abu Shujaa on 26 July.

During the 2025 Israeli military operation in the West Bank, Israeli forces established control over Nur Shams and expelled all inhabitants, leaving the fate of the militia unknown.
