= Jihad Shehadeh =

Palestinian military commander (1999–2023)

- Native name: جهاد مهراج إبراهيم عبد الوهاب شحادة
- Birth name: Jihad Maharaj Ibrahim Abdul Wahab Shehadeh
- Born: 18 February 1999 Tulkarm Camp, West Bank
- Died: 6 November 2023 (aged 24) Tulkarm, West Bank
- Cause of death: Shot
- Allegiance: Palestine
- Branch: al-Aqsa Martyrs Brigade
- Rank: Major General

Jihad Maharaj Ibrahim Abdul Wahab Shehadeh (Arabic: جهاد مهراج إبراهيم عبد الوهاب شحادة; 18 February 1999 – 6 November 2023) was a Palestinian military commander and co-founder of the Tulkarm Battalion. He was one of Israel's most wanted, as he was accused of directing and carrying out a series of shootings at IDF forces at Israeli military checkpoints.

== Biography ==
Shehadeh was born to a family from the Tulkarm refugee camp, attending various schools in his youth.

He co-founded the Tulkarm Battalion - Rapid Response military branch with Amir Abu Khadija, and Shehadeh later took total command of it. Israeli intelligence forces requested Shehadeh to surrender himself several times throughout his career, to which he declined. He was placed at the district headquarters for al-Qassam for three months in hiding, and then subsequently left to return to military activity. He became one of Israel's most wanted and the Shin Bet accused him of carrying out many shootings at Israeli military checkpoints.

Shehadeh had been arrested multiple times by Israel previously, and spent several months in prison, along with his father Brigadier general "Maharaj Shehadeh", who had been arrested by Israel in 2001 and released in 2016 due to his activity in the Al-Aqsa Martyrs Brigades.

== Assassination ==
Shehadeh was assassinated by Israeli forces in a special operation in Tulkarm on 6 November 2023 by firing 100 bullets at his moving vehicle, which he was using along with fellow Tulkarm combattant Izz al-Din Raed Award and others of the al-Qassam Brigades. Their bodies were transferred to Martyr Dr. Thabet Thabet Governmental Hospital. They died of their injuries, according to an announcement by the Palestinian Ministry of Health.
