= 2024 Israeli military operation in the West Bank =

Operation Summer Camps מבצע מחנות קיץ
- Part of the Israeli incursions in the West Bank during the Gaza war
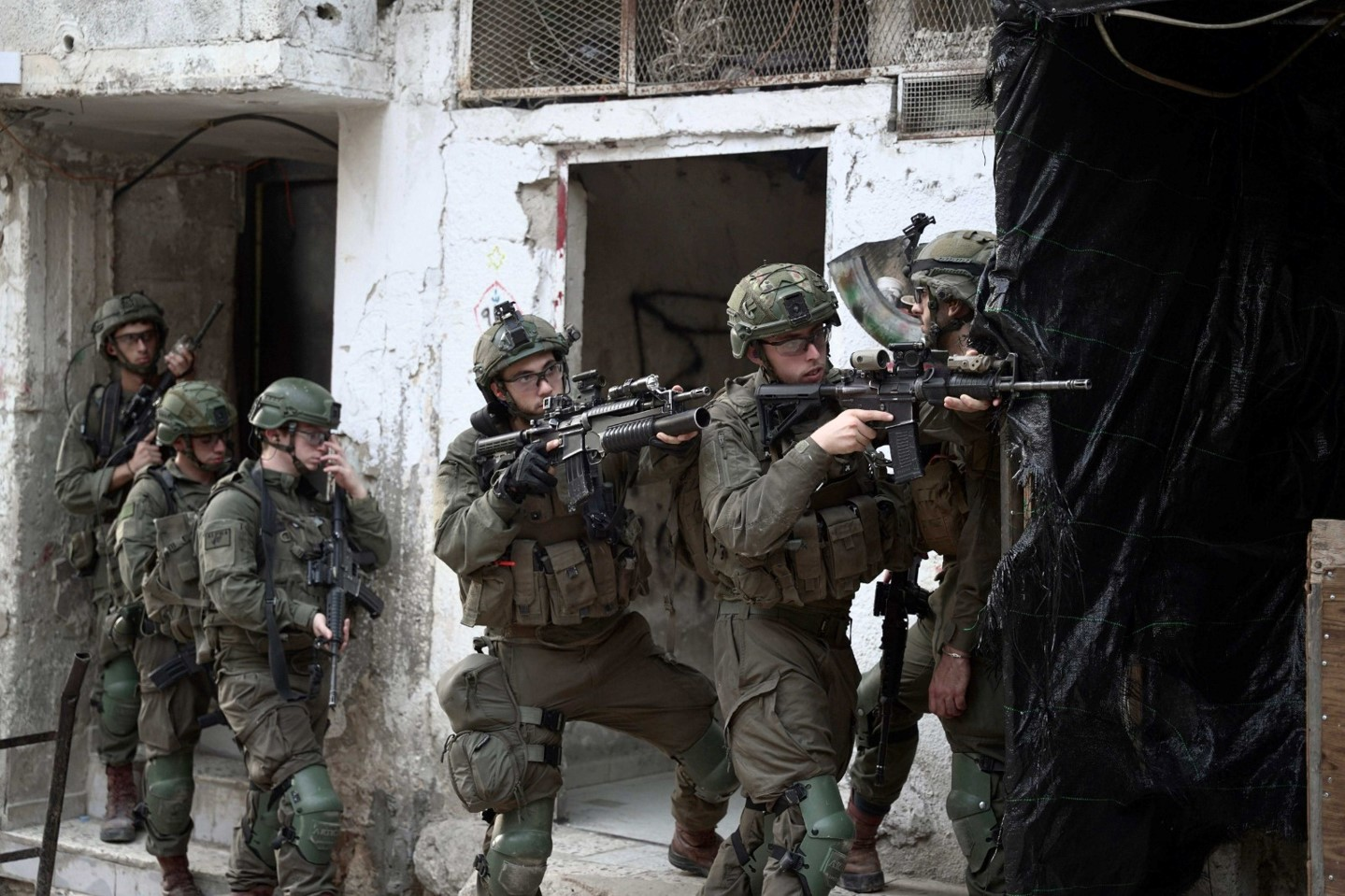
- IDF soldiers of the Kfir Brigade participate in a West Bank raid during "Operation Summer Camps", September 2024. Graffiti depicting the Palestinian flag is visible in the background.
Date	28 August – early October 2024 (Note: No official IDF announcement about the conclusion of Operation Summer Camps has been documented. However, the first days of October 2024 were the last time period in which sources referred to the operation as ongoing. Furthermore, sources from 11 October and 5 November 2024 referred to the operation as having concluded, and in January 2025, the operation was referred to as having ended in October 2024.)
Location	Israeli-occupied West Bank, Palestine
Result	Inconclusive (see aftermath)

Belligerents
Israel (Palestine) Palestinian Authority	(Palestine) Palestinian militant groups; Palestinian Islamic Jihad; Al-Aqsa Martyrs' Brigades; Hamas

Units involved
Israel Defense Forces; Israeli Ground Forces; Bislamach Brigade; 906th Battalion; Kfir Brigade; Haruv Reconnaissance Unit; Israeli Air Force; Israeli Police; Israeli Border Police; Palestinian Security Services; Palestinian National Security Forces	(Palestine) Palestinian Joint Operations Room; (Palestinian Islamic Jihad) (Fatah) (Hamas) Tulkarm Brigade; (Palestinian Islamic Jihad) (Fatah) (Hamas) Jenin Brigades; (Fatah) Khalil al-Rahman Brigade; Other militant units

Casualties and losses
2 IDF soldiers killed, 4 wounded 3 police officers killed 3 settlers killed, 3 wounded 2+ armoured vehicles damaged	At least 25 insurgents killed Per Israel: 23+ insurgents killed 30+ suspected insurgents arrested
- At least 59 Palestinians killed, (including a woman, a disabled person, a UNRWA staff member, two elderly people and several children) (Note: 21 in Jenin, 13 in Tubas, 12 in Tulkarm, 3 in Hebron, 1 in Nablus, 7 in Qabatiya.); 1 foreign activist killed At least 150 wounded

On 28 August 2024, Israel launched a large-scale military operation in the occupied West Bank.

It was Israel's largest military operation in the West Bank in more than 20 years since its Operation Defensive Shield in 2002, and marked a significant escalation of the continual Israeli incursions into the region against Palestinian militants during the ongoing Gaza war. Israel called it "Operation Summer Camps" (Hebrew: מבצע מחנות קיץ), while Palestinian militants labeled their response as the "Horror of the Camps" (Arabic: رعب المخيمات) operation.

Israel said its goal was to stop Palestinian militant activity in the West Bank, whereas Palestinians felt that the operation could be an expansion of the war aimed at their displacement. Israel also said the raids were aimed to thwart Palestinian suicide bombings, following a failed attempt in Tel Aviv.

== Background ==
Israel's military operation occurred as Israeli settler violence targeting Palestinian infrastructure and civilians in the West Bank has surged. More than 650 Palestinians in the West Bank, including both gunmen and civilians, were killed since the Hamas-led October 7 attacks, which began the ongoing war, while 27 Israelis, including both civilians and security forces, were killed in Palestinian attacks within Israel and the West Bank.

== Timeline ==
=== 28 August ===
Israel Defense Forces (IDF) Arabic spokesman Avichay Adraee announced a counterterrorism operation called "Summer Camps" in a joint statement with the Shin Bet. Israeli foreign minister Israel Katz stated that the operation was a "full-fledged war" focused on stamping out "terrorist infrastructures", accusing Iran of trying to establish an "eastern terrorist front" against Israel in the West Bank by funding and arming local militants. The Israeli operation came about following a failed suicide bombing in Tel Aviv by a Hamas operative, and calls by Hamas for the renewal of suicide attacks.

Hundreds of troops from the IDF, as well as bulldozers and air support, began operating in Tulkarm and Jenin. Operations were also reported in al-Fara'a refugee camp, near Tubas. Entry points into Tulkarm and Jenin were blocked off by the IDF, which also encircled two hospitals in Tulkarm.

=== 29 August ===
The IDF killed Muhammad Jabber, known as Abu Shujaa, who led the Tulkarm Brigade, based in Nur Shams. He was wanted by Israel for his involvement in planning and executing multiple attacks against Israeli targets, including the June 2024 shooting of an Israeli civilian.

Hamas and Palestinian Islamic Jihad (PIJ) in Tulkarm and Jenin targeted IDF troops operating in these cities with ambushes and explosives.

The IDF withdrew from the al-Fara'a refugee camp, claiming they completed "the objective of foiling terror, exposing terrorist infrastructure and eliminating armed terrorists".

=== 30 August ===
Israeli Border Police forces killed Wassem Hazem, the head of Hamas in Jenin, near the town of Zababdeh. The Jenin Brigades reported "fierce clashes" with Israeli soldiers inside Jenin.

The al-Aqsa Martyrs' Brigades used two car bombs to attack Israeli settlements near Hebron.

=== 31 August ===
Aftermath of the first raid on Jenin from August to September 2024

The IDF announced that a squad commander of the Bislamach Brigade's 906th Battalion was killed and three others were injured during a shootout with two Hamas fighters in Jenin. Both militants were also killed.

The family of a 10-year-old girl accused the IDF of using her as a human shield.

=== 1 September ===
Three Israeli police officers were shot dead by a gunman from Hebron close to Tarqumiyah checkpoint on route 35 in the Hebron Governorate of Palestine. The Khalil al-Rahman Brigade claimed responsibility for the shooting, which was praised by Hamas.

=== 3 September ===
A Palestinian girl, Lujain Musleh, aged 16, was reportedly shot dead by the Israeli military in Kafr Dan when she looked out of her home's window; the Israeli military responded that "terrorists opened fire at IDF soldiers in the area, and in response the soldiers fired back at a suspect who observed the forces in the area, in order to remove a threat".

=== 6 September ===
The IDF withdrew from Jenin, Tulkarm, and their refugee camps. Following the Israeli withdrawal from Jenin, militants were seen parading through the city.

There was speculation that the withdrawals signified the operation had concluded, but Israel clarified that it was not over and that its forces would continue military actions "in order to achieve the objectives of the counterterrorism operation".

=== 9 September ===
It was reported that the Palestinian Authority (PA) agreed to a new security deal with Israel that would see its National Security Forces working alongside the IDF in the West Bank to counter militancy when the Israeli operation concludes.

Clashes broke out between militants and PA security forces in the Jenin refugee camp after the latter dismantled an explosive intended to target IDF vehicles near the camp entrance.

=== 10 September ===
The IDF returned to operate inside Tulkarm and its surrounding refugee camps.

=== 11 September ===
An Israeli airstrike near Tubas killed five people.

A Palestinian militant carried out a ramming attack near the Givat Asaf settlement, killing one IDF soldier.

=== 12 September ===
The IDF withdrew from Tulkarm.

The IDF killed 10 people during a raid into al-Fara'a camp, including a UNRWA worker whom Israel accused of participating in Palestinian militancy.

=== 19 September ===
The IDF battled Palestinian militias in Qabatiya, where it also conducted an airstrike that killed four militants, including Shadi Zakarneh, a local commander. Soldiers were seen kicking and throwing the corpses of dead militants off a rooftop in the city.

The al-Quds Brigades of PIJ targeted the Shaked settlement with gunfire.

The al-Aqsa Martyrs' Brigades targeted an IDF checkpoint at Mount Ebal with gunfire.

=== 21 September ===
The al-Aqsa Martyrs' Brigades targeted an IDF checkpoint at Mount Gerzim with gunfire.

=== 25 September ===
The IDF resumed operations inside Jenin.

=== 26 September ===
The IDF conducted a situational assessment in the West Bank to review how to prevent attacks from Palestinian militants ahead of upcoming Jewish holidays.

=== 30 September ===
In Balata Camp outside Nablus, four IDF soldiers, including one from the elite Duvdevan Unit, were wounded during an exchange of fire with militants.

=== 3 October ===
An Israeli airstrike on a café in the Tulkarm refugee camp killed at least 20 people, including Zahi Yaser Abd al-Razeq Oufi and Ayyth Radwan, the heads of the local Hamas and PIJ branches, respectively. It was the first Israeli strike on Tulkarm since 2002 during Operation Defensive Shield. Several civilians including elderly and children were killed in the airstrike, which was the deadliest since the Second Intifada of 2000–2005. Laith Jaar, an Al Jazeera journalist who was covering the bombing was assaulted by a PA security officer, who threatened to shoot him. Jaar was subsequently arrested and detained by the PA security forces, but was released the next day.

=== 4 October ===
An Israeli airstrike on a building in the Tulkarm refugee camp killed 12 Hamas and PIJ members who had gathered to plan an attack against Israel.

== Aftermath ==
The operation did not deal a substantial blow to Palestinian militancy. In December 2024, Yoni Ben Menachem, writing for the Jerusalem Center for Security and Foreign Affairs, stated that Operation Summer Camps had "failed to dismantle the terror infrastructure in northern Samaria, (Note: Refers to the northern West Bank. See Judea and Samaria.) as most militants fled to rural areas". Similarly, Yaakov Lappin, writing for Jewish News Syndicate in January 2025, described the operation as one of many Israeli operations throughout the years that had failed to "[offer] any real solution".

== Responses ==
UN secretary general António Guterres, called for Israel to end its operations in the West Bank. UN secretary general spokesman said Israel should "exercise maximum restraint and use lethal force only when it is strictly unavoidable to protect life." In a social media post, the UN Human Rights Office stated it was "appalled" by reports that Israel had "shot and unlawfully killed" three children in Jenin.

The Israeli ambassador to the UN responded by saying that Israel will not wait for suicide bombings, adding that bombs were being smuggled in by Iran. The United States called for Israel to protect civilians in the West Bank during its operations, and recognized Israeli security reasoning for the operation.

Hamas called for Palestinians in the West Bank to rise up and blamed the escalation on United States support for Israel. It also called on the Palestinian Authority's security forces to join the fighting against Israel.

The Palestinian Authority condemned the operation despite its own cooperation with Israel, and called on the United States to intervene.

In late-September 2024, the International Rescue Committee warned that intensifying violence in the West Bank could obstruct the healthcare system.

== See also ==
- Israeli occupation of the West Bank
- October 2024 Palestinian Authority operation in Tubas
- December 2024 Palestinian Authority operation in Jenin
- 2025 Israeli military operation in the West Bank
