= Iron Wall (Israeli military operation) =

Iron Wall חומת ברזל
- Part of the Israeli incursions in the West Bank during the Gaza war and the Palestinian Authority–West Bank militias conflict
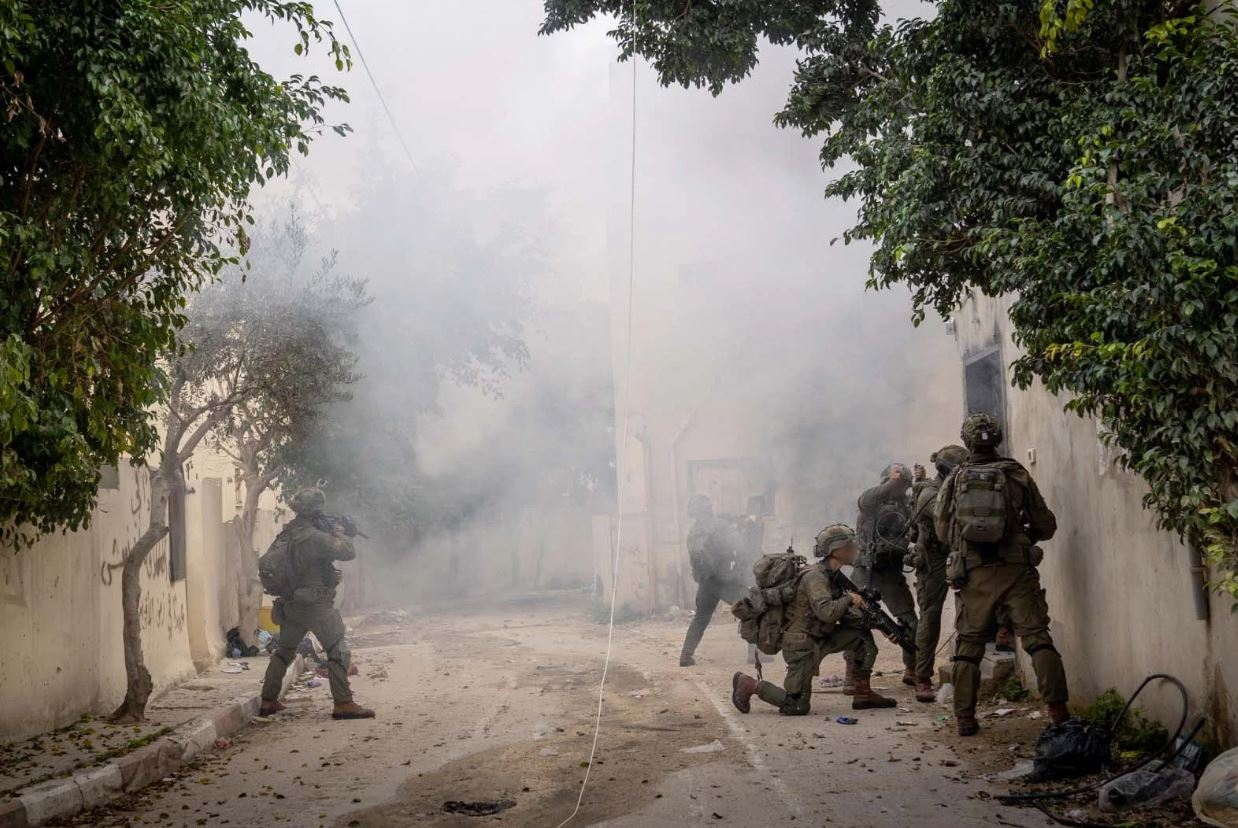
- Israeli soldiers operating in Jenin, January 2025
Date	21 January 2025 – present (1 year, 7 months, 2 weeks and 2 days)
Location	West Bank, Palestine
Status	Ongoing: Israel establishes full military control over the Jenin, Nur Shams, and Tulkarm refugee camps; Palestinian militant activity in the West Bank significantly degraded

Belligerents
Israel; Palestinian Authority	Palestinian Islamic Jihad; Al-Aqsa Martyrs' Brigades; Hamas; Supported by: Iran (Palestine) Palestinian civilian protestors

Commanders and leaders
(Israel) Avi Bluth; (Israel) Yaakov Dolf; (Israel) Guy Levy; (Israel) Barak Hiram	(Palestinian Islamic Jihad) Bassam al-Saadi (POW); (Palestinian Islamic Jihad) Nour Abdel Karim al-Bitawi X; (Hamas) Ihab Atwi X; (Hamas) Aysar al-Saadi †

Units involved
List of Israeli units: Israel Defense Forces; Israeli Ground Forces; Central Command; Infantry Corps; 98th Paratroopers Division; Oz Brigade; Duvdevan Unit; Egoz Unit; Maglan; 99th Infantry Division; Kfir Brigade; Nahshon Battalion; Haruv reconnaissance unit; Bislamach Brigade; Judea and Samaria Division; Menashe Brigade; Ephraim Brigade; Benjamin Brigade; Samaria Brigade; Northern Command; 188th Armored Brigade; Southern Command; 162nd Division; Nahal Brigade; Israeli Air Force; Israeli Police; Israeli Border Police; Unit 23; Yamam; Yamas; Israeli Intelligence Community; Shin Bet; (Israel) Armed Israeli settlers; Palestinian Security Services; Palestinian National Security Forces; Palestinian Preventive Security	(Palestine) Palestinian Joint Operations Room; (Palestinian Islamic Jihad) (Fatah) (Hamas) Jenin Brigades; Silat al-Harithiya Company; Al-Yamun Company; Silat al-Dhahr Company; (Palestinian Islamic Jihad) (Fatah) (Hamas) Tulkarm Brigade; (Palestinian Islamic Jihad) (Fatah) (Hamas) Nablus Brigade; (Palestinian Islamic Jihad) (Hamas) Tubas Brigade; Al-Fara'a Camp Company; Tammun Company; (Palestinian Islamic Jihad) (Hamas) Qabatiya Brigade; (Palestinian Islamic Jihad) Ramallah Brigade; Al-Bireh Company; (Fatah) Youth of Revenge and Liberation; Other militant units; (Palestine) Lone wolf attackers; (Palestine) Rogue PA officers

Casualties and losses
5 Israeli soldiers killed Per the PA: Several security services personnel killed (by the IDF) (Note: While Israel claims its operation was launched with the knowledge and coordination of the PA, the PA claims the operation caught them by surprise and that members of their security services were killed by the IDF. Nonetheless, a day after the IDF operation began, PA forces began fighting militants alongside the IDF.)	Per the IDF: 102 militants killed (Note: As of 7 May 2025.); 320 militants arrested
- 40,000 Palestinians displaced (Note: Israel said it will not allow them to return.); Unknown number of civilians killed

On 21 January 2025, the Israel Defense Forces (IDF) began a large-scale military operation, which it named "Iron Wall", (Note: Hebrew: חומת ברזל) against Palestinian militants in the Israeli-occupied West Bank. Initially, Israel's operation only targeted the Jenin Brigades, a local Palestinian militia in Jenin. On the fourth day, the IDF expanded its activities to Tulkarm and other Palestinian cities and towns. Iron Wall marks a strategically distinct and more aggressive approach against West Bank militancy compared to previous Israeli operations, and also marks the first time that the Palestinian Authority (PA) (Note: The PA autonomously governs the West Bank's Palestinian enclaves and is also in conflict with local militias.) has directly participated in an Israeli military operation.

The IDF stated that the aims of Iron Wall are to preserve its "freedom of action" in the West Bank, to neutralize militant infrastructure, and to eliminate imminent threats. Israeli prime minister Benjamin Netanyahu also said the operation is an action against the "Iranian axis", referring to the Iranian support of West Bank militants, and Israeli far-right finance minister Bezalel Smotrich said it marks the start of a campaign to protect Israeli settlements in the occupied region. Israeli defense minister Israel Katz said it marks a shift in the IDF's security plan in the West Bank and was "the first lesson from the method of repeated raids in Gaza", later clarifying that Israeli forces planned to maintain a long-term military presence in Jenin beyond the operation's conclusion. In August 2025, Katz stated the IDF would remain deployed to refugee camps in the northern West Bank at least until the end of the year.

Compared to Israel's last West Bank operation in 2024, Iron Wall has reportedly been yielding operational success. Israeli forces have seized control of the Jenin refugee camp, Nur Shams, and the refugee camp in Tulkarm, clearing them from militants and depopulating them by the end of February. More than 40,000 Palestinians have been forced to leave their homes due to the operation, with the rate of displacement being the highest since the 1967 Palestinian expulsions. According to UNRWA, Iron Wall is "the longest and most destructive" Israeli operation since the Second Intifada.

== Background ==
The Israeli operation followed several related developments in the region. On 19 January, the Gaza war ceasefire was implemented, halting fighting in the Gaza Strip. (Note: The ceasefire broke down in March 2025, after Israel launched surprise attacks on the Gaza Strip.) On 20 January, American president Donald Trump was inaugurated for the second time and later issued an executive order rescinding sanctions against some Israeli settlers and settler groups accused of anti-Palestinian violence in the West Bank. That same day, a mob of Israeli settlers raided several Palestinian towns in protest against the Gaza ceasefire, until being dispersed by the IDF.

=== PA operation in Jenin ===
In Jenin specifically, the security services of the PA had been conducting an operation against the Jenin Brigades since December 2024. Both sides signed a truce on 17 January 2025, but the deal fell through and fighting resumed two days later. The IDF initiated its operations due to the PA's operation eventually being deemed insufficient, according to The Jerusalem Post.

== Timeline ==
=== 2025 ===
==== January ====
On 21 January, the operation began with drone strikes on militant infrastructure, and large numbers of IDF troops, including special forces, as well as Shin Bet agents and Border Police officers, were deployed into Jenin. Palestinian sources also reported the participation of Israeli warplanes and armored vehicles, including bulldozers. Palestinian Authority forces withdrew from their positions in Jenin as the IDF entered the city. According to the PA, the Israeli operation caught them by surprise and members of its forces were killed by Israeli fire. According to Israel, however, the PA was informed of the decision to enter Jenin beforehand, and PA forces withdrew to allow the IDF to proceed with their operations. The IDF also encircled Al-Amal, a local private hospital.

On 22 January, Israeli forces released as many as 600 people who had been detained overnight inside the Jenin Governmental Hospital, according to the mayor of Jenin. Palestinian Authority forces stormed the Al-Razi hospital and arrested a man said to be a Jenin Brigades militant, marking the first ever time that PA forces have participated in an Israeli raid in the West Bank. In Burqin, near Jenin, Israeli forces killed two militants that had carried out an attack against Israelis earlier in the month.

On 23 January, hundreds of Palestinians from the Jenin camp began leaving their homes after Israeli forces issued an evacuation order. PA forces arrested the Al Jazeera journalist Mohammed al-Atrash, who was attempting to cover the Israeli operation in Jenin.

On 24 January, Israeli forces blocked four main entrances to Jenin with earth mounds, preventing entry and exit, and set fire to residences in the Jenin refugee camp. In Yabad, west of Jenin, PA forces arrested and beat up a number of militants. Furthermore, joint Israeli–PA raids were reported in Tulkarm, Ramallah, Hebron and Qalqilya.

On 26 January, the IDF reported it had destroyed a bomb-making laboratory in Jenin.

On 27 January, the Iron Wall operation officially expanded to Tulkarm Governorate. The Israeli Air Force struck and killed Tulkarm's local Hamas commander Ihab Atwi and another militant in the Nur Shams refugee camp, and fighting broke out in Tulkarm between militants and Israeli forces on the ground.

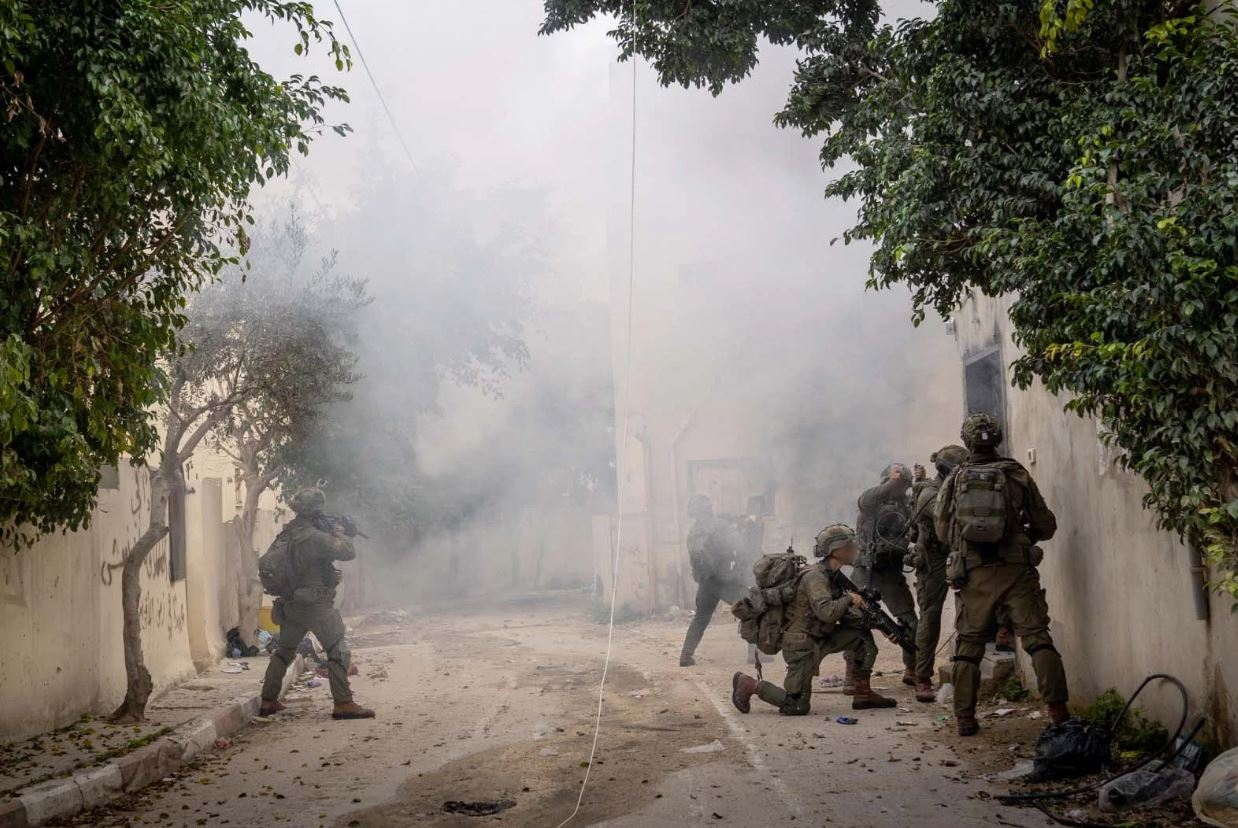
IDF soldiers raiding Jenin, January 2025

On 29 January, Israeli defense minister Israel Katz said that Israeli forces planned to remain in Jenin indefinitely, even after the operation is concluded. This would mark the first time since the Second Intifada that Israeli forces are stationed in a Palestinian city for an extended period of time.

==== February ====
On 1 February, Israeli forces raided Nablus and the adjacent Balata refugee camp.

On 2 February, the IDF conducted a series of massive detonations in Jenin, stating it destroyed 23 buildings being used as "militant infrastructure". Israeli forces also expanded their operation into Tammun, closing the main road in the town.

On 3 February, the governor of Tulkarm Governorate, Abdullah Kamil, reported that half of the population of Tulkarm fled and that hospitals are being sieged, and residences were being attacked by Israeli forces.

On 4 February, a Palestinian gunman attacked an Israeli checkpoint in the village of Tayasir, north of Tubas, killing two IDF soldiers and wounding another eight. Additionally, PA forces clashed with militants in eastern Jenin.

On 9 February, Israeli forces surrounded and attacked the Nur Shams camp. The Tulkarm Brigade said it successfully ambushed a group of IDF soldiers inside the camp.

On 18 February, A Palestinian official said that Israeli forces demolished more than a dozen apartment buildings inside the Tulkarm refugee camp.

On 20 February, three empty Israeli buses exploded in Bat Yam, south of Tel Aviv; no one was harmed. Israeli police commander Haim Sargarof said the devices used to set off the blasts were similar to those used by West Bank militants. One of the unexploded mechanisms carried a message saying "Revenge from Tulkarm"; the Tulkarm Brigade released a statement that said "Revenge for the martyrs will not be forgotten as long as the occupier sits on our land", but did not explicitly claim responsibility for the attack. The Shin Bet said that the attack was directed by Iran and carried out by Hamas.

On 21 February, following the bus bombings, Netanyahu ordered an intensification of the operation in the West Bank, and the IDF said it would deploy three more battalions to the region.

On 23 February, the IDF deployed three Merkava tanks from the 188th Armored Brigade to Jenin, marking the first time since Operation Defensive Shield that Israeli tanks operated in the West Bank.

==== March ====
On 4 March, the IDF said they killed Aysar al-Saadi, a Hamas commander in Jenin, in a shootout.

On 6 March, the IDF rescued 10 Indian workers who had been forcibly held by Palestinians in the village of al-Zaayem for over a month; the Israeli Population and Immigration Authority reported that the workers had traveled to Israel for construction jobs but were lured to the village with false promises of employment by Palestinians, who took their passports to attempt illegal entry into Israel.

On 7 March, the IDF targeted and damaged six mosques in Nablus, including the historical landmark An-Nasr Mosque, which was partially burned. Local officials condemned the attacks.

On 8 March, militants targeted an Israeli civilian vehicle traveling near Nabi Ilyas with Molotov cocktails.

On 10 March, PA forces in Jenin killed the prominent Jenin Brigades militant Abdul Rahman Abu Al-Muna.

On 12 March, a militant shot and injured an 18-year-old Israeli near the Ariel settlement. Hamas claimed responsibility and said that it was a response to Israeli military actions in the West Bank.

On 21 March, near the Dolev settlement, a militant carried out a shooting attack targeting an Israeli bus and a Magen David Adom ambulance, after which he engaged in an hours-long exchange of fire with the IDF; eventually, he was killed with a helicopter strike. The attacks resulted in several casualties.

==== April ====
On 2 April, the IDF and the Shin Bet released a joint statement reporting a significant decrease in militant attacks in the West Bank during Ramadan 2025, compared to Ramadan 2024, and credited the decline to the Iron Wall operation. Additionally, the IDF raided the Dheisheh refugee camp in Bethlehem, and distributed leaflets warning residents that they could be displaced like the Palestinians in the northern West Bank.

On 9 April, the IDF began a large-scale raid of the Balata camp.

On 20 April, a Palestinian gunman opened fire at Israeli soldiers outside the Homesh outpost and was killed by return fire. No injuries among the Israelis were reported. Hamas applauded the shooting but did not explicitly take responsibility.

On 24 April, the IDF, Shin Bet, and the Israeli Border Police conducted a joint raid in the Balata camp to arrest the head of a militant cell and another operative. During the raid, the Israeli forces fired on Palestinian rioters that had confronted them.

On 30 April, two IDF reservists were injured by a bomb attack near the town of Beita southeast of Nablus.

==== May ====
On 7 May, a gunman opened fire on Israeli forces at the Reihan checkpoint, causing injuries. The same day, in Hebron, another militant attempted a car-ramming attack against IDF troops and then began stabbing soldiers. The combined attacks injured three soldiers in total.

On 9 May, IDF troops operating in Nablus killed Nour Abdel Karim al-Bitawi, the commander of the Jenin Brigades.

On 13 May, PA forces killed two Palestinians, a man in the Far'a refugee camp in Tubas and an elderly man in eastern Jenin. Both victims were similarly shot in the head while in their cars. A young girl was also injured by shrapnel resulting from the shooting. In response, Hamas condemned the killings and accused the PA of "unpatriotic practices."

On 14 May, a gunman shot two Israelis, a man and his pregnant wife, near the Bruchin settlement. They had been en route to a hospital for the woman to give birth; she died from her injuries but the baby was saved via C-section. Afterwards, the IDF began besieging the Palestinian villages of Burqin and Kafr al-Dik as they looked for the shooter, and two Israeli settler attacks against Palestinian properties nearby appear to have been carried out in retaliation.

On 21 May, a group of European, Arab, and Asian diplomats on an official mission to access the humanitarian situation in Jenin were fired on by the IDF, sparking international condemnation. The IDF apologized for the incident, stating it had fired warning shots to move the delegation away since it had deviated from the authorized route of the visit. Following the killing of Israeli embassy workers in Washington, D.C. that same day, Israeli Foreign Minister Gideon Saar accused Europe of "antisemitic incitement". In an interview with CBC News, the Israeli ambassador to Canada claimed that the diplomats may have been "led astray".

On 27 May, Israeli forces raided money exchange shops in Ramallah, Nablus, Hebron Arrabeh, Al-Bireh, Bethlehem, Jenin, and Tubas. According to Israel, the shops were being used to funnel money into "terrorist infrastructure".

==== June ====
On 6 June, the IDF arrested the new unnamed commander of the Jenin Brigades, a PIJ member, during an operation near Jenin.

On 10 June, the IDF began a large-scale raid into Nablus, with Palestinian rioters confronting Israeli military vehicles entering the city. Two Palestinians were killed by the IDF after they tried to take a soldier's weapon. Troops took over several buildings for use as temporary bases.

On 12 June, a gunman was killed after firing at Israeli troops at a checkpoint near the Hermesh settlement.

On 13 June, following the start of the Twelve-Day War with Iran, Israel began implementing a strict lockdown on the West Bank that included severe restrictions on Palestinians' movement.

On 29 June, the Shin Bet reported it had broken up a Hamas network in Hebron, arresting 60 militants.

==== July ====
On 10 July, two PA police officers carried out a combined shooting and stabbing attack at the Gush Etzion settlement bloc, which resulted in one Israeli casualty. Hamas praised the attack, while the Palestinian Security Services were said to plan an internal investigation. Also on that day, during an IDF raid on the village of Rumana near Jenin, a Palestinian attacker stabbed and wounded a soldier.

On 22 July, the PA's Preventive Security Force reportedly arrested an entire militant cell in Nablus, which possessed a number of explosive devices intended for use against Israeli forces.

==== August ====
On 4 August, Israeli forces entered Qabatiya to arrest two wanted Palestinians, both of whom subsequently engaged in firefights with the forces. One of the suspects was killed and the other arrested.

On 21 August, a gunman fired at Israeli settlers at the Malachei HaShalom outpost and then reportedly fled into the nearby Palestinian village of Al-Mughayyir, Ramallah Governorate. The IDF subsequently launched a days-long raid on the village, uprooting olive trees, attacking homes, beating residents, and stealing money and jewelry. The IDF stated that uprooting olives trees was a necessary security measure to expose "hidden enemy movements". The attacker was captured during the raid.

On 26 August, Israeli forces raided Ramallah, targeting a money exchange shop which the IDF said was transferring funds to Hamas. Local Palestinians threw stones at troops during the operation. According to the Red Crescent, at least 27 people were injured in the raid and Israeli forces were obstructing the evacuation of those who were wounded.

On 27 August, An Israeli raid on Nablus injured at least 80 people.

On 28 August, Israeli forces raided 17 Palestinian schools in Hebron.

==== September ====
On 8 September, following a mass shooting in East Jerusalem, IDF troops began raiding Palestinian villages on the outskirts of Ramallah. Meanwhile, Qabatiya Brigade militants reportedly attacked invading Israeli forces in Qabatiya with an explosive device. Additionally, the IDF reportedly opened fire on a group of civilians who had attempted to return to the Jenin refugee camp to retrieve belongings; two Palestinian youths were killed.

On 11 September, a bomb reportedly placed by PIJ militants detonated on the Palestinian side of the Nitzanei Oz crossing near Tulkarm, injuring two Israeli soldiers. The IDF subsequently enforced a closure on the city and carried out mass detentions of residents.

On 12 September, a Palestinian assailant from East Jerusalem carried out a stabbing attack in Tzova, northwest of Jerusalem, wounding two Israelis, and was arrested at the scene. Meanwhile, the Tubas Brigade said its militants ambushed Israeli forces at the al-Fara'a camp.

On 16 September, PA security forces captured militants who were preparing to launch a rocket from the village of Niama, Ramallah Governorate.

On 18 September, a Jordanian who had been working as an aid delivery driver from Jordan to the Gaza Strip shot and killed two Israelis, both soldiers, at the Allenby Crossing. The attacker was shot and killed by Israeli forces, and Jordan said it would open an investigation into the shooting.

On 19 September, Israeli forces raided Ramallah and arrested a militant cell that was producing rockets.

On 21 September, Israeli forces raided Birzeit University, arresting campus security personnel, damaging property, and defacing murals. Soldiers distributed leaflets to students and staff that stated the activity of student organizations was equivalent to terrorist activity.

On 25 September, an hours-long shootout took place in Tammun between Israeli forces and two Tubas Brigade militants, ending with both being killed. The Tubas Brigade also reportedly launched attacks on Israeli forces in multiple areas of Tubas. Meanwhile, the Ramallah Brigade said its militants detonated explosives at an Israeli military post near the Psagot settlement and carried out a shooting attack against soldiers at another post.

On 26 September, the Tulkarm Brigade said its militants were able to carry out an operation inside Israeli-controlled Nur Shams, damaging an Israeli military bulldozer with a pre-laid explosive.

On 28 September, a Palestinian assailant from Nablus carried out a vehicle-ramming attack against IDF soldiers at the Jit junction near the Kedumim settlement, which resulted in the death of one soldier via friendly fire.

On 30 September, two Israeli teenagers were wounded in a vehicle-ramming attack at the Al-Khader junction, carried out by a Palestinian attacker who was shot dead at the scene.

==== October ====
On 1 October, an overnight Israeli raid in Beitunia resulted in the seizure and dismantlement of a large cache of rockets.

On 2 October, two militants attempted a vehicle-ramming and shooting attack against IDF soldiers at a checkpoint, without success; one was killed and the other was arrested.

On 8 October, the Israeli army and the Shin Bet announced they had intercepted a weapons shipment allegedly sent by Iran to West Bank Palestinian militias.

On 10 October, Israeli forces launched raids in the Ramallah and Nablus areas, abducting several Palestinians.

On 31 October, clashes between the IDF and Palestinians in Silwad, near Ramallah, resulted in the death of a teenager by Israeli gunfire.

==== November ====
On 4 November, Israeli forces raided Qalqilya, Beit Furik, Hebron, Tulkarm, Nablus, Bethlehem, Dura, Kafr Aqab, Silwad, Al-Bireh, Tubas, Qabatiya, Deir Jarir, and Kafr Laqif.

On 10 November, a militant shot at Israeli police officers near the Beit Hagai settlement; the exchange of fire resulted in his death.

On 18 November, two Palestinian attackers carried out a vehicle-ramming and stabbing attack at the Gush Etzion Junction. One Israeli was killed and three others were wounded.

On 21 November, Israeli forces raided Kafr Aqab, Umm al-Sharayet, Arraba, Beit Ummar, and Saida.

On 24 November, Israeli forces killed a suspected militant in Nablus during a siege of his house.

On 25 November, Palestinians in the Marka village clashed with Israeli forces.

On 26 November, the IDF launched a new military operation in the northern West Bank, named Operation Five Stones, focused on Tubas, Tammun, the al-Fara'a camp, and other villages. While some sources described the operation as an extension of Iron Wall, the IDF said it was not and referred to it as a new and distinct operation.

On 27 November, two Palestinian men, reportedly militants of the Jenin Brigades, were summarily executed by Israeli police officers from the Yamas special forces unit seconds after they had surrendered. Israeli national security minister Itamar Ben-Gvir defended the police officers, stating "the fighters acted exactly as expected of them – terrorists must die". Meanwhile, the UN human rights office condemned the executions.

==== December ====
On 1 December, a Palestinian attacker carried out a vehicle-ramming attack near the Kiryat Arba settlement, which left an IDF soldier lightly injured. In response, the IDF reportedly raided all clinics and hospitals in the Hebron area. Also, Israeli forces raided al-Bireh, with confrontations erupting and five residents suffering injuries.

On 2 December, two IDF soldiers were lightly wounded following a stabbing attack carried out near the Ateret settlement.

On 6 December, a vehicle-ramming attack at an IDF checkpoint in Hebron left one Israeli soldier lightly wounded.

On 9 December, Israeli forces reportedly raided Birzeit University and Al-Quds University, arresting five campus security guards.

On 10 December, Israeli forces carried out mass arrests of more than 100 Palestinians throughout the West Bank.

On 13 December, the IDF said a Palestinian hurled an explosive device at troops operating in Silat al-Harithiya.

On 14 December, IDF troops shot and killed a Palestinian who attempted to stab them at a junction near Hebron. On the same day, Israeli forces shot and wounded a child during a raid on Jalazone, amid clashes with residents.

On 17 December, Israeli forces raided Jenin, arresting multiple suspected militants and seizing weapons.

On 26 December, a Palestinian attacker from Qabatiya carried out two separate attacks in northern Israel that resulted in the deaths of two Israelis.

On 31 December, Israel began carrying out mass demolitions in Nur Shams.

=== 2026 ===
==== January ====
On 1 January, Israeli forces opened fire on Palestinians who were throwing stones at them near Luban al-Sharqiya; one Palestinian was killed.

On 6 January, Israeli forces raided Birzeit University, clashed with students, and seized property from a Hamas-affiliated student group.

On 7 January, IDF troops operating near Beita were targeted by a Palestinian attacker throwing Molotov cocktails, but no injuries were reported.

On 16 January, Israeli forces stormed al-Mughayyir and shot and killed a local teenager, following a settler incursion earlier in the day.

On 19 January, Israeli forces launched a large-scale raid into the Hebron neighborhood of Jabal Johar, set to last several days. Tracked armored vehicles were used by the IDF in Hebron for the first time since the Second Intifada.

==== February ====
On 4 February, the Israeli army stormed a school in the Tubas Governorate.

On 15 February, PA security forces opened fire on the car of a militant outside Tammun, killing his two children and arresting him.

On 16 February, IDF Duvdevan commandos reportedly captured a Palestinian arms dealer in Ramallah.

On 28 February, the Israeli army announced a general lockdown on the West Bank following the start of the 2026 Iran war.

==== March ====
On 10 March, Israeli forces raided the Balata camp.

On 12 March, the IDF said two Palestinian gunmen opened fire at an army post, and then attempted a car-ramming before being shot dead near Tapuah Junction.

On 14 March, Israeli soldiers, saying they were pursuing accused militants, opened fire on a Palestinian family inside a car in Tammun; the soldiers killed four people, including two children. A surviving child was pulled out of the car and beaten by the soldiers.

==== April ====
On 13 April, Israeli authorities allowed 120 women displaced from Jenin Camp to briefly return to retrieve belongings.

== Humanitarian impact and human rights violations ==
The scale of destruction during the Israeli operation has been compared to that of the Gaza Strip. According to historians and researchers, the Iron Wall operation also marks the biggest displacement of civilians in the West Bank since the Six-Day War in 1967, with UNRWA stating more than 40,000 Palestinians have been forced from their homes. UNRWA also describes Iron Wall as "the longest and most destructive" Israeli operation since the Second Intifada. Jenin refugee camp has become mostly deserted, and thousands of Palestinians have been displaced from Tulkarm. The IDF has demolished dozens of homes in Jenin, Tulkarm, and Nablus, and leveled entire residential blocks. In Jenin, Israeli forces destroyed water reserve tanks, and destroyed around 180 homes. Israeli soldiers in Tulkarm reportedly forced one Palestinian man into unpaid labor as a personal servant.

Israeli and Palestinian Authority forces have besieged and stormed multiple hospitals. According to a report published by Doctors Without Borders on 6 February 2025, access to healthcare in the occupied West Bank has been severely hindered by a widespread network of Israeli checkpoints and roadblocks, which impede the movement of ambulances and emergency medical teams.

Various instances of Israeli forces killing civilians of all ages have occurred throughout the operation. According to Yaniv Kubovich of Haaretz, sources from inside the IDF reported that expanded open-fire orders from the Central Command have made soldiers on the ground "trigger-happy".

On 20 November 2025, Human Rights Watch released a report that claimed the destruction and depopulation of Nur Shams and the camps in Jenin and Tulkarm, which have displaced 32,000 Palestinians, are forcible displacement and other inhumane acts, amounting to war crimes and crimes against humanity.

On 4 September 2026, the Office of the United Nations High Commissioner for Human Rights (OHCHR) published a report concerning events in the occupied West Bank. According to the findings, more than 33,000 Palestinian residents of the Jenin, Nur Shams, and Tulkarm refugee camps were forcibly displaced during a military operation. The report cautioned that such actions may constitute forcible transfer, which is recognized as a crime against humanity under international law. Additionally, the document expressed serious concern that the circumstances of the displacement could amount to collective punishment, and further raised the possibility of ethnic cleansing.

== Reactions ==
- Hamas issued a statement calling for "people in the West Bank and its revolutionary youth to mobilize and escalate the clash with the occupation army at all points of contact with it." Hamas also condemned the Palestinian Authority's participation in the raid, saying that its security coordination with Israel had "reached catastrophic levels".
- The Palestinian Authority accused Israel of collective punishment and said the raid was part of an Israeli plan to gradually annex the West Bank, despite its own participation in the operation.
- Ayman Safadi, Jordan's Minister of Foreign Affairs, warned that the situation was dangerous and that "the whole world needs to take a deep look at what is happening, and, with the same vigour that we're looking at the ceasefire, we should also be working to prevent an explosion in the West Bank."
- (United Nations) Secretary-General Antonio Guterres called for "maximum restraint", and Special Rapporteur Francesca Albanese wrote on X that "If it is not forced to stop, Israel's genocide of Palestinians will not be confined to Gaza. Mark my words."
- France expressed concerns over the operation and called on Israel to show restraint.

== Analysis ==
On 28 January 2025, a Haaretz article by Yaniv Kubovich claimed that the Jenin Brigades (referred to as "the Hamas battalion in the refugee camp") do not actually exist, and are an Israeli invention for the purposes of linking the original Jenin raid to the Gaza war. The article alleges that the only so-called militants in Jenin are "young criminals who... had been getting a few hundred dollars to shoot at IDF forces", and cites the unidentified commander of the Menashe Brigade who admitted there was not really a "battalion".

Dalia Hatuqa, writing for Politico, said that many Palestinians believe the operation is a way for Israelis to continue to take revenge on the Palestinian population for the October 7 attacks, despite the Gaza ceasefire.

The Jerusalem Post reported on 18 September 2025 that Israeli security sources believe Hamas' infrastructure has been reestablished in other areas of the West Bank, away from refugee camps that are now controlled by Israeli forces, and that there is an increasing risk of PA officers being recruited as militants.

== See also ==
- January 2023 Jenin incursion
- July 2023 Jenin incursion
- Operation Summer Camps
