= 2024 Ra'anana attack =

Part of the Israeli–Palestinian conflict

- Part of the Israeli–Palestinian conflict
- The attack site
- Location: 32°11′N 34°52′E; Ra'anana, Israel
- Date: January 15, 2024; 13:30 – 15:30
- Target: Avichay Adraee (alleged)
- Attack type: Vehicle-ramming attack, mass stabbing
- Weapons: Knife, multiple cars
- Deaths: Edna Blustein, aged 79
- Injuries: 18 (including children)
- Perpetrator: (Fatah) Khalil al-Rahman Brigade
- Assailants: Mahmoud & Ahmad Zidat
- Motive: Reaction to the Israeli invasion of the Gaza Strip (2023–present)

On January 15, 2024, a double vehicle-ramming and stabbing attack occurred in the industrial zone of the Israeli city of Ra'anana. 79 year old Edna Bluestein, a pedestrian, was stabbed and killed and eighteen others were injured. The two attackers, cousins and residents of Bani Na'im in the Hebron area, were arrested. The Khalil al-Rahman Brigade claimed responsibility for the attack.

Car ramming has increasingly become a terrorist weapon.

== Attack ==
The attack occurred around 13:30 when two Palestinians from Bani Na'im entered who had been illegally employed at a local car wash, stabbed Edna and then stole a car. He then drove around the city, changing three cars and running over several civilians. Afterwards, he took control of another vehicle, drove towards Haroshet Street, and hit civilians. He then reached Weizmann Street, where he ran over several people and fled the scene.

Immediately after receiving reports of the incident at the emergency centers, security forces began a pursuit of the attacker. A rapid police chase and additional special units led to his capture, along with someone who apparently assisted him in the attack.

Very quickly, a large number of police forces arrived, including the Police Commissioner Kobi Shabtai and the District Commander Avraham Biton. The victims were directly evacuated to the hospital along with a woman in her 70s, where her death was pronounced after resuscitation efforts. In addition, three were seriously injured, including a 16-year-old boy. Nine people were moderately injured, and six were lightly injured, including children.

== Assailants ==
The assailants were Mahmoud Zidat, 44, and Ahmad Zidat, 25, brothers from Bani Na'im in the Hebron area, who were staying in Israel illegally, working in a city car wash. The two had been apprehended several times before for staying in Israel illegally. In May, preceding the attack, Mahmoud Zidat was caught for illegal stay, and was sentenced to a relatively short punishment of 20 days of actual imprisonment in addition to a conditional sentence, partly due to consideration of his personal and family situation, despite 6 previous convictions.

The Shin Bet, Israel’s internal security agency, reported that the pair aimed to carry out the attack in response to Israel’s war on Gaza. Avichay Adraee, the Israeli military's Arabic spokesman, was allegedly targeted due to his prominence in Arab media as a representative of Israeli forces. Police investigation indicated that months before the attack, Ahmed Zidat observed Adraee at a restaurant and considered attacking him but was unarmed at the time. Zidat reportedly returned to the area for weeks, armed with a knife, in search of Adraee but did not encounter him again.

One of the assailants reportedly told police that after the start of the Gaza war, "Initially, we intended to stab Jews, but then we decided to run over as many Jews as possible."

Mahmoud and Ahmad pleaded guilty and were convicted in July 2024 on charges including aggravated murder and causing injury. In April 2025, an Israeli court sentenced them to life imprisonment plus 60 years.

== Reactions ==
=== Hamas ===
Hamas said in a statement: "We confirm that the 'Ra'anana' guerrilla operation carried out by our Palestinian heroes, Al-Murabitun, is a natural response to the massacre acts of the Nazi occupation... We are mobilizing our revolutionary youth across the West Bank and Jerusalem, and call on them to escalate the struggle and the revolution until the overthrow of the Nazi occupation, to liberate our land and our sanctity, and to establish our Palestinian state. With Jerusalem as its capital, blessed be God."
