= Martyr Dr. Thabet Thabet Governmental Hospital =

Hospital in Tulkarm, West Bank, Palestine

Martyr Dr. Thabet Thabet Government Hospital
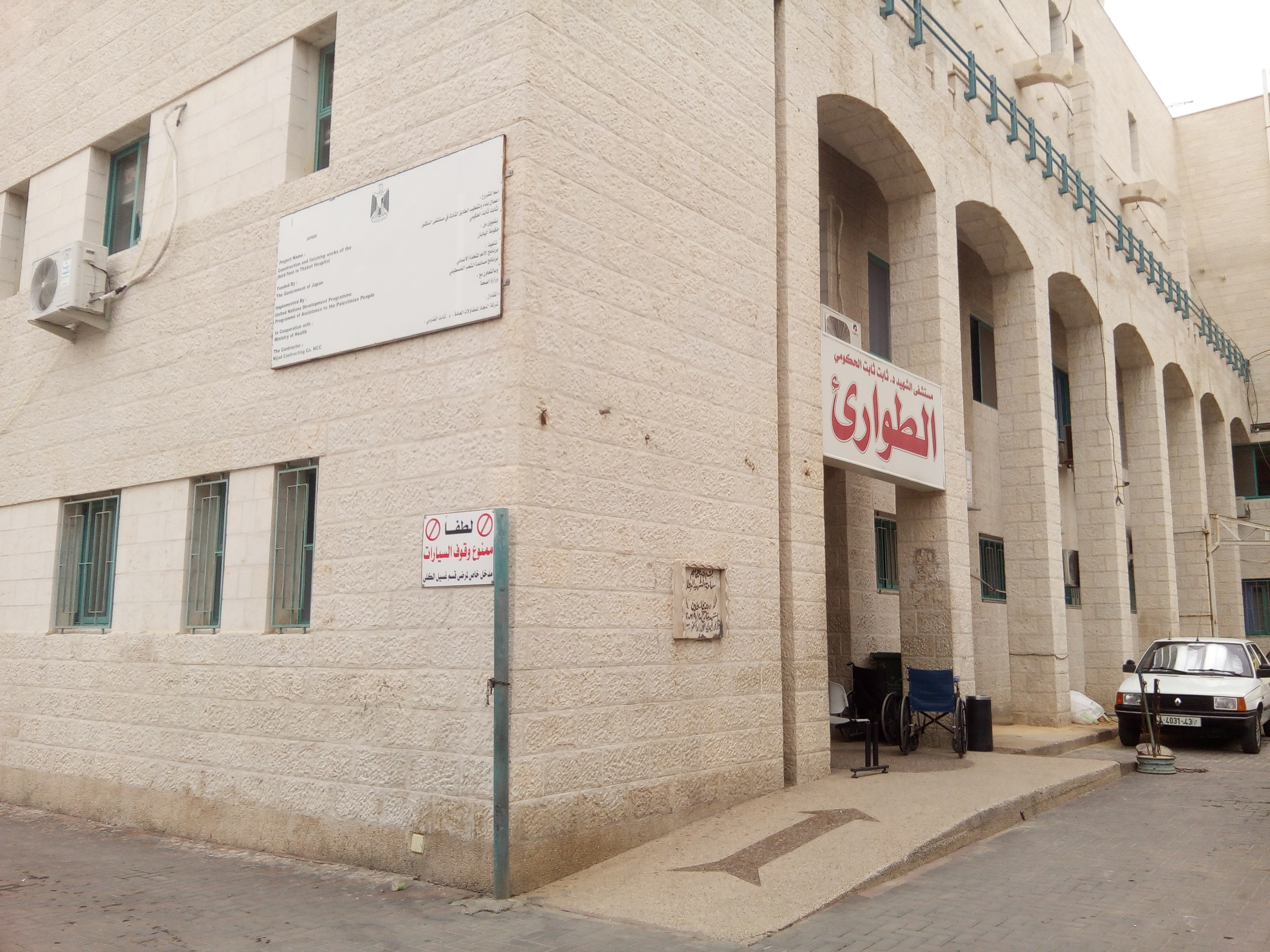

Geography
- Location: Tulkarm, Tulkarm Governorate, West Bank, Palestine
- Coordinates: 32°18′53″N 35°1′49″E

Organisation
- Care system: Public
- Type: Community

Services
- Emergency department: Yes
- Beds: 158

History
- Founded: 2004

Links
- Lists: Hospitals in Palestine

Martyr Dr. Thabet Thabet Governmental Hospital or Tulkarm Governmental Hospital is a government hospital in Tulkarm, West Bank, Palestine. It is under the jurisdiction of the Palestinian Ministry of Health. It was built in 2004 and has 158 medical beds. It employs 317 staff, including a doctor, nurse, pharmacist, physiotherapist, laboratory technician, radiologist and others.

The hospital is named after Dr. Thabet Thabet, a prominent Palestinian doctor, university lecturer, and Fatah member, who was assassinated by Israeli undercover units in December 2000.

The hospital was repurposed for treating COVID-19 cases in 2020 during the COVID-19 pandemic after an infected man entered the facility.

In 2022 the hospital debuted its newly upgraded operating room.

On 26 July 2024, clashes between Palestinian Authority security forces and Palestinian protestors occurred at the hospital after the security forces encircled the building, allegedly in an attempt to arrest Abu Shujaa, leader of the Tulkarm Brigade.
