= July 2024 West Bank unrest =

- Part of the Palestinian Authority–West Bank militias conflict and the Middle Eastern crisis (2023–present)
| Date | 29 July – early August 2024 |
| Location | West Bank, Palestine |
| Result | Inconclusive: End of large-scale unrest; Relations between the PA and militants remain hostile |

Belligerents
| Palestinian Authority | Palestinian Islamic Jihad (Fatah) Al-Aqsa Martyrs' Brigades; Hamas |

Units involved
| Palestinian Security Services; Palestinian National Security Forces | (Palestine) Palestinian Joint Operations Room; (Palestinian Islamic Jihad) (Fatah) (Hamas) Tulkarm Brigade; (Palestinian Islamic Jihad) (Fatah) (Hamas) Nour Shams Brigade; (Palestinian Islamic Jihad) (Hamas) Tubas Brigade; (Palestinian Islamic Jihad) (Fatah) (Hamas) Jenin Brigades; Bethlehemi militants; (Palestine) Palestinian protestors; (Fatah) NSF defectors |

Casualties and losses
| Unknown | At least 2 militants arrested Several protestors injured |

The July 2024 West Bank unrest refers to a period of instability in the West Bank lasting from late July to early August 2024. This marked a significant escalation of violence between the Palestinian Authority and Palestinian militants amid protests in multiple cities. The unrest began over the Palestinian Authority security forces attempting to arrest Tulkarm Brigade commander Abu Shujaa, who was hospitalized inside a hospital in Tulkarm. This incident worsened the existing conflict between the PA and militias, leading to confrontations throughout the West Bank. The unrest gradually subsided by early August with no major change and relations remaining tense.

== Background ==
The Palestinian Authority, which sometimes coordinates security with Israel, is deeply unpopular among most Palestinians, who largely view it as ineffective and subjugated to the Israeli occupation and instead lend more support to the various militias present in each West Bank city. As a result, there has been an armed conflict between the Palestinian Authority and West Bank militias since 2022, with earlier sporadic clashes occurring before the escalation in July 2024. The escalation took place amidst the backdrop of the Gaza war and the related Israeli incursions into the West Bank.

The Tulkarm Brigade is one of the many armed Palestinian militant groups present in the West Bank. The leader of the brigade, Mohammed Jaber, better known by his nom de guerre "Abu Shujaa", is a key figure wanted by the Israeli authorities and had been injured by previous Israeli raids on Tulkarm in December 2023. He was thought to have been killed by the Israel Defense Forces during one of their raids into Tulkarm in April 2024, but later resurfaced attending a funeral for multiple slain Palestinian fighters.

== Course of the unrest ==
=== Tulkarm ===
On July 26, 2024, Abu Shujaa was hospitalized at the Martyr Dr. Thabet Thabet Governmental Hospital in Tulkarm after suffering an injury from an explosive device. Soon after, the security forces of the Palestinian Authority encircled the hospital and allegedly tried to arrest Shujaa as part of the crackdown on local militias.

In response, the brigade and other Palestinian militias declared a state of high alert, and targeted the local headquarters of the security forces with heavy gunfire. The Tulkarm Brigade, together with Hamas, Palestinian Islamic Jihad, and the Al-Aqsa Martyrs' Brigades, issued statements calling for the local population to mobilize and head to the hospital to lift the siege and prevent the arrest of Abu Shujaa.

Soon after, a large crowd of Palestinian civilians arrived at the hospital to obstruct the PA's arrest operation. As a result, clashes between the security forces and West Bank militias broke out in Tulkarm as a crowd of Palestinian civilians arrived at the hospital aiming to break the alleged siege. The Palestine Chronicle published a video from inside the hospital showing protestors confronting security forces, which reportedly deployed tear gas and fired on them, resulting in several wounded. Ultimately, the security forces withdrew from the hospital, and the crowd retrieved Abu Shujaa and escorted him to the Nour Shams refugee camp in Tulkarm.

The next day, after the security forces arrested the militant Tariq Balidi, the Tulkarm Brigade demanded that he be released by 10 p.m., and accused the Palestinian Authority of wanting to start a civil war. Demonstrations began at the entrance to the Tulkarm refugee camp. After the deadline passed, the Brigade targeted the government headquarters in Tulkarm with explosives.

=== Spread to other cities ===
==== Jenin ====
The Jenin Brigades issued a statement condemning and threatening the security forces, stating "if anyone attacks us, we will attack them in kind". Gunmen from the Brigades attacked the Palestinian Authority headquarters in Jenin.

==== Tubas ====
Hours after the end of the alleged siege in Tulkarm, security forces in Tubas attempted to detain a member of the Tubas Brigade, and shot at him. They detained the militant's brother, who was released after an hour. The Tubas Brigade condemned this as an "assassination attempt" and referred to the security forces as puppets of the Shin Bet.

Later that day, a crowd of young protestors blocked roads in Tubas and began clashing with security forces, chanting slogans against them. The Tubas Brigade targeted the local headquarters of the security forces with gunfire.

==== Bethlehem ====
A protest march also broke out in Bethlehem against the Palestinian Authority's actions in Tulkarm. Protestors clashed with security forces and set fire to the gates of their local headquarters. It was also reported that the security forces beat and arrested a boy who was protesting.

There was also infighting within the security forces, with several personnel arrested, a move sharply criticized by the local Fatah politicians. On the 30th, dozens of Fatah-aligned gunmen who apparently defected from the security forces appeared on the streets of Bethlehem and were seen shooting wildly into the air. These gunmen, who began clashing with security forces, threatened Fatah politicians and demanded their resignations. On the 31st, security forces attempted to arrest militants and were met with protests outside their local headquarters.

== Aftermath ==
By August, the unrest had been "contained", according to Tulkarm officials.

On 3 August, a political committee in Hebron associated with the security forces was reported to have published a declaration condemning West Bank militants and warning that continued animosity towards the Palestinian Authority could result in a violent internal conflict similar to the 2007 Battle of Gaza between Fatah and Hamas.

On 15 August, Hamas condemned the Palestinian Authority for constantly targeting militants, confiscating weapons, dismantling explosives, and interfering with ambushes during Israeli incursions.

== Reactions ==
Mustafa Taqataqa, the governor of Tulkarm Governorate, alleged that the security forces intervened only after "a group of individuals" attempted to storm the hospital, and called for all health institutions to be kept out of conflicts.

A contradictory statement was released by Fatah, the Palestinian political party which controls the Authority, claiming that security forces entered the hospital to protect, not arrest, Abu Shujaa after learning of IDF activity at the entrances to Tulkarm, and that the crowd that arrived at the hospital was misguided by "inflammatory rumors".

Both Hamas and Palestinian Islamic Jihad condemned the actions of the security forces, with the latter warning that it threatened the recent unity agreements of the 2024 Beijing Declaration.

The Jenin Brigades also condemned the security forces while threatening to retaliate if attacked. The brigade claimed that the security forces had previously attempted a similar siege on a hospital in Jenin during which they assaulted mothers of slain Palestinian fighters.

== See also ==
- 2024 Palestinian Authority operation in Tubas
- 2024–2025 Palestinian Authority operation in Jenin
