= Qabatiya Brigade =

Palestinian militia in the West Bank

- كتيبة قباطية
- Dates active: 2022 – present
- Headquarters: Qabatiya, West Bank
- Ideology: Palestinian nationalism Anti-Zionism
- Part of: Al-Quds Brigades (Hamas) Al-Qassam Brigades

The Qabatiya Brigade or Qabatiya Battalion (Arabic: كتيبة قباطية, romanized: Katībat Qabatiya), also known as the Qabatiya Groups, is a Palestinian militia in the West Bank based in Qabatiya. It primarily exists as a branch of the Al-Quds Brigades of Palestinian Islamic Jihad (PIJ), but is also affiliated with the Al-Qassam Brigades of Hamas.

== History and armed actions ==
The Qabatiya Brigade was formed in late 2022.

On 12 January 2023, the group, together with civilians throwing stones, engaged in clashes with the Israel Defense Forces (IDF) in Qabatiya, resulting in two Palestinian deaths.

On 19 September 2024, as part of the "Operation Summer Camps" Israeli military operation, the IDF raided Qabatiya and killed several Palestinians, at least one of whom may have belonged to the Qabatiya Brigade. Militants from the group participated in the funeral for the dead.

On 19 November 2024, the IDF killed three militants from the Qabatiya Brigade, following a siege on their positions at an agricultural facility in Ash-Shuhada, south of Jenin. On 28 November, its militants engaged in clashes with IDF troops raiding Qabatiya.

In December 2024, after the Palestinian Authority (PA) launched a large-scale operation in nearby Jenin, the Qabatiya Brigade attacked the local Qabatiya headquarters of the PA in solidarity with the Jenin Brigades.

On 1 February 2025, two Qabatiya Brigade militants were killed in a drone strike, as part of the "Iron Wall" Israeli military operation.
