= 2024 Palestinian Authority operation in Tubas =

Operation Protecting the Nation
- Part of the Palestinian Authority–West Bank militias conflict and the Middle Eastern crisis (2023–present)
Date	8 October – late November 2024
Location	Tubas Governorate, West Bank, Palestine
Result	PA victory

Belligerents
(Palestine) Palestinian Authority; Supported by: United States	Palestinian Islamic Jihad; Hamas; Supported by: (Palestine) Civilian protestors Iran (per PA)

Units involved
Palestinian Security Services; Palestinian National Security Forces; Palestinian Civil Police Force	(Palestinian Islamic Jihad) (Hamas) Tubas Brigade (Note: The Tubas Brigade encompasses militants belonging to the Al-Quds Brigades of Palestinian Islamic Jihad and the Al-Qassam Brigades of Hamas.)

Casualties and losses
2 officers injured	80 militants arrested

In October 2024, the Palestinian Authority (PA) launched an anti-militant operation in and around Tubas, West Bank, against the Tubas Brigade, a local Palestinian militia based in the city. The PA titled it "Operation Protecting the Nation".

The PA, led by president Mahmoud Abbas, sought to suppress militancy in Tubas, which it sees as part of a wider Iran-backed push to undermine Fatah, the ruling party of the PA; it also sought to demonstrate strength in the face of a widespread perception that it is an ineffective administration.

The operation ended after the arrest of 80 Tubas Brigade militants in November.

== Timeline ==
=== 8 October ===
PA security forces in Tubas arrested the commander of the Tubas Brigade, Ahmed Abu Al-Ayda, who was also wanted by Israel, and in response protestors erected roadblocks in the city and militants engaged in clashes with the security forces. Al-Ayda was shot during his arrest.

Following the arrest, the Israel Defense Forces (IDF) moved into the city.

Militants also targeted the headquarters of the Palestinian Civil Police Force in al-Fara'a camp near Tubas with gunfire.

=== 11 October ===
More clashes in Tubas over the arrests of Abu Al-Ayda and other militants were reported, with one person injured. Security forces entered Tubas in civilian vehicles and ambushed militant positions in the center of the city. In response, militants in Tubas called for a popular mobilization against the Palestinian Authority. Some young men who were not part of the Tubas Brigade but allegedly provided assistance to them were arrested by the security forces.

=== 13 October ===
Students in Tubas refused to attend classes and organized demonstrations in support of the militants.

=== 18 October ===
Security forces opened fire on residents who were organizing a vigil for the recently killed Hamas leader Yahya Sinwar.

=== 19 October ===
Security forces carried out an hours-long siege of a house in Tubas where there were two militants, Obada al-Masri and Bakr Abbas; local militant reinforcements failed to break the siege and the two were eventually arrested.

=== 5 November ===
Security forces seized and detonated an explosive planted by militants that had been planted to target raiding IDF soldiers.

== End of operation and aftermath ==
Under pressure from continued clashes and the cutting off of water and electricity into Tubas by the PA, 80 members of the Tubas Brigade ended up surrendering. This occurred right after the ceasefire between Israel and Hezbollah in Lebanon, which may have influenced the mass surrender with militants realizing that no outside party would be coming to their aid. According to International Crisis Group, this was tantamount to a PA victory, and emboldened it to go after militants in Jenin.

Nonetheless, the Tubas Brigade managed to remain intact and continues to be active in fighting against the IDF.

== Reactions ==
Residents of Tubas said the clashes were some of the worst violence they could remember.

Ahmed Asaad, the governor of the Tubas Governorate, commended the "iron fist" of the operation against what he described as instability and chaos.

Hamas and Palestinian Islamic Jihad said that the Palestinian Authority is serving Israel's agenda and encouraged militants to confront the security forces in Tubas.

The Tubas Brigade increased security precautions, with some militants moving out of their homes and staying away from the city.

Ghaith al-Omari, an expert on Palestinian Authority affairs at The Washington Institute for Near East Policy, said that the PA wants to restore its reputation with the Tubas operation, but also that Tubas represented "low-hanging fruit" since militants there are weaker than in other areas.

== See also ==
- July 2024 West Bank unrest
