= Tubas Brigade =

Palestinian militia

- كتيبة طوباس
- Other name: Tubas Battalion
- Founder: Ahmed Daraghmeh †
- Dates active: June 2022–present
- Ideology: Palestinian nationalism Anti-Zionism
- Part of: Al-Quds Brigades al-Qassam Brigades

The Tubas Brigade or Tubas Battalion (Arabic: كتيبة طوباس, romanized: Katībat Tûbâs) is a Palestinian militia in the Israeli-occupied West Bank, based in the city of Tubas. It encompasses militants from the Al-Quds Brigades of Palestinian Islamic Jihad (PIJ) and the Al-Qassam Brigades of Hamas.

The Tubas Brigade was founded in June 2022 by the militant Ahmed Daraghmeh, with the bulk of its members being former prisoners held by Israel. Its existence was announced by PIJ the following month, through anti-Zionist media channels, after the militia engaged Israel Defense Forces (IDF) troops that were raiding Tubas.

According to Mondoweiss, the Tubas Brigade, along with the Jenin Brigades, Tulkarm Brigade, and Lions' Den, have posed a significant challenge to Israeli security control in the West Bank. On 27 February 2024, the IDF killed Daraghmeh, who had been serving as the group's leader, and two Palestinian civilians during a raid into Tubas.

The Tubas Brigade is also an enemy of the Palestinian Authority (PA), which the Brigade says began actively persecuting them in May 2024. PA forces clashed with the Tubas Brigade during the July 2024 West Bank unrest. In October 2024, the PA launched a successful large-scale crackdown on the group, during which militants increased security precautions and relocated out of Tubas. Despite a mass surrender of Brigade members to the PA, the group remains intact and active in fighting against the IDF. The Tubas Brigade fought Israeli forces during the four-day Operation Five Stones.
