= Rashad Abu Sakhila =

Palestinian actor and poet (2001–2024)

- Born: 10 August 2001; Jabalia refugee camp, Gaza Strip, Palestine
- Died: 2 September 2024 (aged 23); Jabalia refugee camp, Gaza Strip, Palestine
- Cause of death: Israeli airstrike
- Education: Al-Aqsa University

Rashad Abu Sakhila (Arabic: رشاد أبو سخيلة;10 August 2001 – 2 September 2024) was a Palestinian actor and poet. He was killed in the Al-Fakhoora School, Gaza Strip by an Israeli airstrike during the Gaza war.

Abu Sakhila was born in Jabalia refugee camp, Gaza Strip to a Palestinian family on 10 August 2001. He studied journalism and media at Al-Aqsa University.

In 2020, Sakhila published Letters of Soil, a poetry collection discussing social issues related to Palestine.

In 2022, he played the role of a Hamas leader in the Al-Aqsa TV series Fist of the Free.

Sakhila was killed on 2 September 2024, during the Gaza war, following an Israeli airstrike on the Al-Fakhoora School in Jabalia, Gaza Strip. Following his death, Sakhila's cousin wrote an article expressing his condolences in Middle East Eye.
