= Khalil al-Rahman Brigade =

Palestinian militia in the West Bank

- كتيبة خليل الرحمن
- Active regions: Hebron, West Bank
- Part of: (Fatah) Al-Aqsa Martyrs' Brigades

The Khalil al-Rahman Brigade or Khalil al-Rahman Battalion (Arabic: كتيبة خليل الرحمن, romanized: Katībat Khalīl ar-Raḥman), is a Palestinian militia in the West Bank.

== Attacks ==
The Khalil al-Rahman Brigade claimed responsibility for the Ra'anana attack of 15 January 2024, a combined vehicle-ramming and stabbing attack targeting Israelis that resulted in two deaths and 18 injuries. The two attackers, Ahmed Zidat and Mahmoud Zidad, were arrested.

On 1 September 2024, during an Israeli military operation in the West Bank, the Khalil al-Rahman Brigade carried out a shooting attack on the Tarqumiyah checkpoint, south of Hebron, that killed three Israeli police officers. Hamas praised the attack as a "natural response" to the war in Gaza. Mohannad Mohammad Mahmoud Al-Asoud, who was allegedly one of the participating militants, was assassinated by Israeli forces at his home in Hebron the next day.
