= Tulkarm Brigade =

Palestinian militant group

- Founder: Saif Abu Labdeh
- Leaders: Amir Abu Khadijeh †; Jihad Shehadeh †; Saeed Izzat Jaber †; Abu Shujaa X
- Dates active: 2022–present
- Headquarters: Tulkarm
- Active regions: Palestine; Israel
- Ideology: Palestinian self-determination Palestinian nationalism Anti-Zionism
- Status: Active
- Size: Around 175
- Part of: Al-Quds Brigades; al-Qassam Brigades; Al-Aqsa Martyrs' Brigades (as Rapid Response Group)
- Wars: Israeli–Palestinian conflict; Israeli incursions in Tulkarm; Israeli incursions in the West Bank during the Gaza war; Operation Summer Camps; Iron Wall; Palestinian Authority–West Bank militias conflict; July 2024 West Bank unrest

The Tulkarm Brigade or Tulkarm Battalion (Arabic: كتيبة طولكرم, romanized: Kateebat Ṭūlkarm) is a Palestinian militant group in the West Bank which is affiliated with various Palestinian political factions. It is based in the Palestinian city of Tulkarm and its camps. The Tulkarm Brigade had been established in late 2021 as a group for the Al-Quds Brigades, although it became independent in March 2022 with its founder Saif Abu Labdeh. Many fighters from Izz ad-Din al-Qassam Brigades joined this group, and in early 2023 many Al-Aqsa Martyrs' Brigades members joined the battalion under the name "Rapid Response Group" founded by Amir Abu Khadijeh.

== Activities ==
On 30 May 2023, the group killed a 32-year-old Israeli settler near the Hermesh settlement.

On 5 October 2023, the group clashed with Israeli forces attacking Tulkarm, resulting in five injuries, including three seriously injured.

On 19 October 2023, the group confronted Israeli forces attacking the Tulkarm refugee camp and the Nur Shams refugee camp, causing the death of one Israeli officer and 10 injuries.

On 23 March 2024, the group claimed to have infiltrated the occupied territories near Al-Deir Gate, attacking a vehicle and causing the deaths of at least four Israeli soldiers.

On 18 April 2024, Israeli forces launched a two day wide-scale incursion attack on the Nur Shams refugee camp of Tulkarm. The group engaged in clashes using homemade explosive devices and rifles. The IDF claimed 9 injuries among its forces, and at least 10 brigade members killed during the raid.

On May 29, 2024, the group led a series of attacks on the Bat Hefer community resulting in property damage. The group also claimed to infiltrate the community and raid a house, seizing a machine gun and pistol.

On 24 June 2024, the group remotely detonated two explosive devices targeting the Bat Hefer community. No casualties were reported.

On 1 July 2024, the group clashed with Israeli forces in the Nur Shams refugee camp. With a homemade explosive, the group managed to disable an Israeli Namer APC and an Israeli Panther armored vehicle, resulting in the death of one Israeli soldier and one severely injured.

On 17 July 2024, the group detonated an explosive near the Hermesh settlement, injuring four Israelis, including two off-duty soldiers and two settlers.

On 26 July 2024, various groups within the Tulkarm Brigade declared a general mobilization in support of leader Abu Shujaa, who was allegedly besieged by the Palestinian Authority while receiving treatment at the Martyr Dr. Thabet Thabet Hospital. The mobilization prevented his arrest.

On 29 August 2024, Shujaa was killed alongside four other fighters during an Israeli attack in Nur Shams.

On 26 September 2025, Tulkarm Brigade militants reportedly managed to detonate an explosive against an Israeli military bulldozer inside Nur Shams, which had been under Israeli control for months as a result of the "Iron Wall" military operation.
