= Amir Abu Khadijeh =

Palestinian military commander (1999 – 2023)

Amir Imad Amin Abu Khadijeh (Arabic: أمير عماد أمين أبو خديجة; January 13, 1999 – March 23, 2023) was a Palestinian militant and former leader of the Tulkarm Brigade. He was from the city of Tulkarm. According to Israeli sources, Abu Khadijeh, who was involved in multiple shooting incidents towards civilians in the area and security forces operating at the Tanim checkpoint, was located and targeted by Israeli Defense Forces (IDF), Border Police Anti-Terrorism units, following intelligence gathered by the Shin Bet. The operation took place in a village near Tulkarm. As the forces surrounded the house where Abu Khadijeh was hiding, he attempted to shoot at undercover Border Police officers from a window but was shot and wounded. The forces entered the apartment, and Abu Khadijeh, attempting to shoot again, was killed.

During the operation, an M16 rifle and other combat equipment were seized, and his vehicle was confiscated. A key accomplice who was with the suspect in the apartment surrendered to the forces, was arrested, and transferred to the Shin Bet for interrogation. There were no casualties among the Israeli security forces.

== Background ==
Amir Imad Amin Abu Khadija was born on January 13, 1999, in Gaza. At the time, his father, Imad Abu Khadija, was working as a government employee there following the establishment of the Palestinian National Authority.

Abu Khadija moved with his family to the eastern district of Tulkarm, his father's home, as a child, and was educated in a number of schools there, including the Abdul Majeed Tayeh School for Boys, and after he finished high school, he joined the Palestine Technical University Khadouri in sports. His father worked as director of computer and information systems at the Palestinian Ministry of Social Development in the West Bank.

Abu Khadija joined the Palestinian Authority's Palestinian Presidential Guard military, but was dismissed from it after being presented to a military court in 2019, as a result of a relationship in an act of resistance; he moved to freelance as a construction workshop and also a driver of a private transport vehicle in Tulkarm, and was detained by Israel for about a year.

== Militant career ==
A while before his death, Amir Abu Khadija founded the Rapid Response Group, meant to be the "special forces" of the Tulkarm Battalion and took over the whole group.

Amir Abu Khadija significantly expanded the battalion's activity, and under his reign the battalion included fighters affiliated with Fatah, PIJ, PFLP, Hamas and other Palestinian organizations.

Abu Khadija had read the first statement of the battalion at the first press conference held by the battalion in Gamal Abdel Nasser Square in the center of Tulkarm city on February 22, 2023.

Israel accused him of carrying out and directing a series of shooting attacks on IDF forces and on Israeli checkpoints and settlements.

In early March 2023, the Palestinian Authority went to arrest him, but there were angry demonstrations in the city of Tulkarm for several days in a row, confrontations broke out between Palestinian youths and the Palestinian security forces, including the closure of streets by young men and the breaking of light signals in the city. Palestinian security forces responded by firing tear grenades and stun grenades.

== Death ==
After a long pursuit of Abu Khadijeh by Israel, Israeli special forces managed to kill him by using the Mista'arvim, the Shin Bet, the IDF and the Border Guards in a military operation during which they besieged a house in which he was holed up in the southern suburb of the city of Tulkarm on Thursday, March 23, 2023, the first day of Ramadan. He shot at Israeli forces who fired more than 40 bullets at him.

The Palestinian Ministry of Health said that Abu Khadija had arrived at a hospital in the city of Tulkarm, and died after being shot in the head and lower limbs; his brain was torn. The killing of Abu Khadija came in light of a pledge by Palestinian and Israeli leaders that had been made on March 19, 2023, which aimed to reduce tension during Ramadan.

The news of Abu Khadija's death had a big impact in the Palestinian territories. Following the killing, Fatah announced a mass strike.

=== Funeral ===
Thousands of Palestinians participated in the funeral procession of Abu Khadija in the streets of Tulkarm. The funeral ceremony was launched from Thabet Government Hospital towards his hometown in the eastern neighborhood of the city, and then to the new mosque in the city center, where funeral prayers were performed. He was buried in the city's western cemetery.

=== Reactions ===
- Israel – An IDF spokesman announced that Amir Abu Khadijeh had participated in several shootings targeting Israeli soldiers in recent months, and that he was planning other imminent attacks.
- (Palestine) Palestinian National Authority – The PNA mourned Abu Khadijeh by government spokesman Ibrahim Melhem.
- (Palestine) Tulkarm Battalion – The Tulkarm Battalion said, "we are on the way, we will not rest and we will not retreat, the revenge of our prince we will realize it soon."
- (Palestine) Lions' Den – Lions' Den said in a statement that they "are proud of the martyr, the leader, the founder of the Tulkarm Battalion, Amir Abu Khadija".
- (Palestine) Palestinian Islamic Jihad – The PIJ mourned Abu Khadija, and the movement said in the words of its leader, Ahmed Al-Mudallal, “The pure blood of the leader on the first day of Ramadan will move in the arteries of the rebellious youth. The blood of Amir Abu Khadijeh is the bullet that announces a new launch and surprises that the occupation will not bear in the month of Ramadan and beyond, and the blood of Amir will mark the beginning of the demise of the occupation."
- Fatah – The Fatah movement declared a mass strike all over Palestine in mourning for his soul.
- (Palestine) Al-Aqsa Martyrs' Brigades - Al-Aqsa Martyrs' Brigades announced that "the martyr and the commander, Amir Abu Khadija, who rose to a cowardly assassination carried out by a special force of the enemy army."
- (Palestine) Hamas – Hamas said in a press statement, “The occupation’s targeting of our heroic resistance will not stop the march of resistance, and it will not scare our people either.”
- (Palestine) Democratic Reform Movement – The Democratic Reform Movement mourned Abu Khadija, and insulted the Israeli government.
- (Palestine) Popular Resistance Committees – The PRC said, “the blood of the pure martyrs will be fuel for revolution in the face of the Zionist enemy and curses that haunt it.”
- (Palestine) Palestinian Freedom Movement - The PFM said, "The rise of the martyrs will not stop the march of the struggle, but rather increase the resistance and revolution of the Palestinians in the West Bank and Jerusalem, and their blood will not go to waste."
