= Khadija School airstrike =

Israeli attack on a Palestinian school

- Part of the Gaza war and genocide
- Location within the Gaza Strip
- Location: Deir al-Balah, Gaza Strip
- Date: 26 July 2024
- Target: Khadija school
- Attack type: Airstrike
- Deaths: 30+ Palestinians
- Injuries: 100+ Palestinians
- Perpetrator: Israel Defense Forces

The Khadija School airstrike by the Israel Defense Forces (IDF) occurred on 26 July 2024 during the Gaza war in the central region of Gaza, specifically in Deir al-Balah. The airstrike killed at least 30 individuals, including seven minors. The Gaza Health Ministry run by Hamas reported an additional 100 casualties. The victims, who had sought shelter at the school, were transported to Shuhada al-Aqsa Hospital for medical attention.

== Background ==
The attack struck Khadija School, which was serving as a refuge for displaced individuals and also functioned as a field hospital.

== Attack ==
The IDF stated it was targeting a Hamas command center, allegedly located within the school. The military further said that the compound was being utilized for planning attacks against Israeli troops and for producing and storing weapons. These allegations were rejected by Hamas.

== Aftermath ==
The aftermath of the strike included the destruction of classrooms, and individuals were forced to sift through debris to locate victims and collect remains. Civil defense workers reported that the school, which also housed a medical site, was providing shelter to more than 4,000 individuals.

== Reactions ==
- The EU foreign policy chief Josep Borrell expressed his disapproval of the strike, and underscored the necessity for a ceasefire.
- Hamas condemned the airstrikes as part of a "genocide plan" against the Palestinian people. and called for international intervention to stop what it described as a systematic campaign of violence against Palestinians.
- The Arab parliament strongly condemned the airstrike, calling it a "heinous massacre" and a "flagrant violation of international law". They criticized the silence of the international community and called for immediate action to hold Israel accountable for its actions. The Arab Parliament urged international, regional and European parliaments to put pressure on their governments to take a stand against these crimes.
- Irish Prime Minister Simon Harris condemned the airstrike, calling it "inhumane and despicable". He stressed that targeting an area populated by displaced families was unacceptable and called for an immediate ceasefire. Harris also highlighted the disproportionate use of force by Israel and the urgent need for unhindered humanitarian access to Gaza.
- The Iranian government expressed deep disapproval of the attack and emphasized the urgent need for international intervention to halt the ongoing violence.
- Syria has denounced the daily massacres carried out by the Israeli occupation against the Palestinian people. The Syrian government highlighted the continuous suffering of Palestinians and called for immediate international action to protect civilians.
- ActionAid called for an immediate end to the hostilities and urged all governments to fulfill their obligations under international law to ensure the safety and security of all civilians.
- Islamic Relief released a statement saying, "We are appalled at yet another deadly massacre at a school".
