= Ramallah Brigade =

West Bank Palestinian militia

- كتيبة رام الله
- Founded: 6 October 2023
- Dates active: September 2025 – present
- Active regions: Ramallah, West Bank
- Ideology: Palestinian nationalism Anti-Zionism
- Part of: Al-Quds Brigades

The Ramallah Brigade or Ramallah Battalion (Arabic: كتيبة رام الله, romanized: Katībat Rām Allāh) is a West Bank Palestinian militia based in Ramallah. It is a branch of the Al-Quds Brigades of Palestinian Islamic Jihad (PIJ).

The launch of Ramallah Brigade operations in late 2025 marks an effort at southward expansion by PIJ, which has historically concentrated its militancy in the northern West Bank.

== History and armed actions ==
The formation of the Brigade was first announced by PIJ on 6 October 2023, a day before the start of the Gaza war, during an event celebrating the 36th anniversary of the militant organization.

Two years later, and nine months into the "Iron Wall" Israeli military operation in the West Bank, the Ramallah Brigade became suddenly active. On 19 September 2025, it announced the targeting of an Israeli military vehicle in Ramallah with an explosive. On 23 September, the group said its sub-unit, the Al-Bireh Company, attacked Israeli forces in Al-Bireh. On 25 September, it said its Al-Bireh Company militants detonated explosives at an Israeli military post near the Psagot settlement and carried out a shooting attack against soldiers at another post in Al-Bireh.

On 17 October, the Ramallah Brigade said its militants carried out a shooting attack against an Israeli military vehicle near the Ofra settlement. On 24 October, it said the Al-Bireh Company carried out shooting attacks on multiple Israeli military positions around Psagot.

The Meir Amit Intelligence and Terrorism Information Center reported on 7 November that PIJ's Telegram channel issued an announcement, sometime in October or November, which stated the Ramallah Brigade's armed activities were "only the beginning" of a new Al-Quds Brigades expansion into the southern West Bank.
