= Abu Shujaa =

Palestinian militant (1998–2024)

- محمد سامر محمود جابر
- Born: Mohammed Samer Mahmoud Jaber; 1998; Nur Shams, Tulkarm Governorate, Palestine
- Died: 29 August 2024 (aged 26); Tulkarm Camp, Tulkarm Governorate, Palestine
- Cause of death: Killed in action
- Occupation: Militant
- Organization: PIJ • Tulkarm Brigade

Mohammed Samer Mahmoud Jaber (Note: Arabic: محمد سامر محمود جابر, romanized: Muḥammad Sāmir Maḥmūd Jābir) (1998 – 29 August 2024), better known by his nom de guerre Abu Shujaa, (Note: Arabic: أبو شجاع, romanized: Abū Shujāʻ, lit. 'Father of the Brave') was a Palestinian militant from the West Bank. A popular and well-known figure among Palestinians, he led the Tulkarm Brigade militant group from April 2022 until he was killed on 29 August 2024 in a raid during an Israeli military operation in the West Bank.

== Biography ==
Jaber was born in Nur Shams, Tulkarm Governorate, in 1998. His family was originally from Haifa but was displaced during the 1948 Palestine war. He began his participation in anti-Israel militant activities at an early age and was arrested multiple times by both Israel and the Palestinian Authority.

In 2022, he co-founded the Tulkarm Brigade alongside its first leader, Saif Abu Labdeh and assumed command after Labdeh was killed on 2 April 2022. Under Jaber's leadership, membership in the Brigade significantly increased. Previously aligned personally with Fatah, he joined Palestinian Islamic Jihad (PIJ) after the start of the Gaza war in October 2023.

A key figure wanted by the Israeli authorities, Jaber participated in planning and executing multiple attacks against Israeli targets, including a June 2024 shooting that killed an Israeli civilian in Qalqilya. He was injured by Israeli raids into Tulkarm in December 2023, and was thought to have been killed by the Israel Defense Forces (IDF) during an April 2024 raid into Tulkarm in April 2024, but later surfaced attending a funeral for multiple Palestinian fighters. The incident gave Jaber "a kind of cult status" among Palestinians.

On 1 July 2024, The New York Times published an article on West Bank militancy that included an interview with Jaber and other militants.

The 26 July 2024 Tulkarm confrontations were sparked after the security forces of the Palestinian Authority attempted to arrest Jaber while he was hospitalized after being injured by an explosive device. Local crowds of Palestinians intervened and forced the security forces to withdraw.

On 29 August 2024, the YAMAM (Israel's National Counter-Terror Unit) killed Jaber and four other militants during fighting inside and around a mosque in Tulkarm, as part of "Operation Summer Camps" in the West Bank. PIJ and Hamas offered condolences for Jaber's death.

== See also ==
- Palestinian political violence
- Martyrdom in Palestinian society
