= Tulkarm Camp =

Refugee camp in Tulkarm, Palestine

- Refugee Camp

Arabic transcription(s)
  - Arabic: مخيّم طولكرم
- Location of Tulkarm Camp within Palestine
- Coordinates: 32°18′50″N 35°2′7″E
- State: State of Palestine
- Governorate: Tulkarm Governorate

Government
  - Type: Refugee Camp (from 1950)
  - Control: Israel

Area
  - Total: 0.18 km^{2} (0.069 sq mi)

Population (2020)
  - Total: 10,387
  - Density: 58,000/km^{2} (150,000/sq mi)

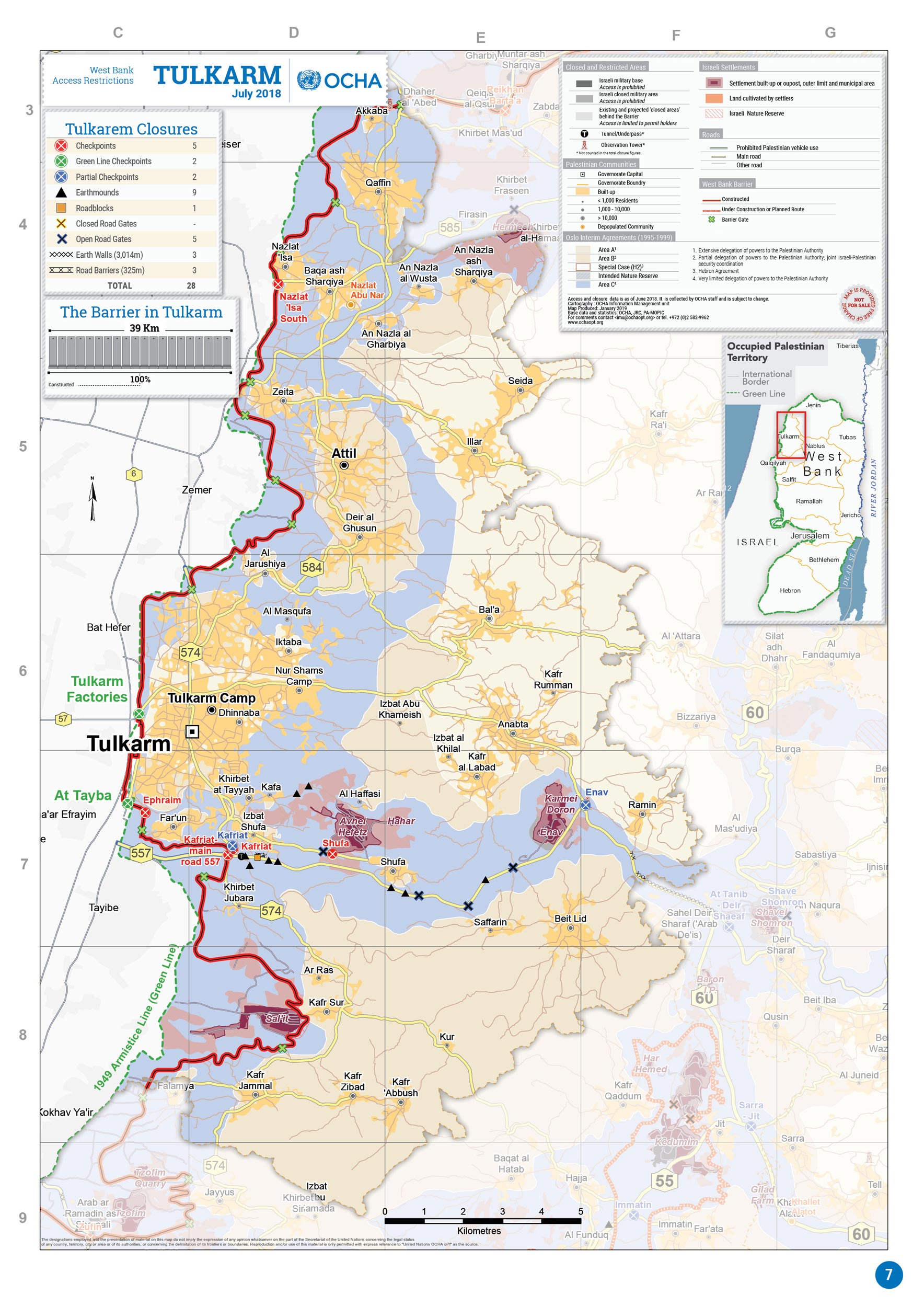
2018 United Nations map of the area, showing the Israeli occupation arrangements.

Tulkarm Camp (Arabic: مخيم طولكرم, romanized: Mukhayyam Ṭūlkarm) is a Palestinian refugee camp north of the West Bank in the city of Tulkarm, established in 1950 on 0.18 km^{2} by the UNRWA. It is the second largest refugee camp in the West Bank, as well as one of the most densely populated. The camp was severely affected during the Second Intifada by incursions, arrests, raids and curfews. Incursions still take place, though on a more irregular basis. In 2013, the health centre was reconstructed with project funds amounting to US$1.7 million. Tulkarm camp has four UNRWA schools. The camp is currently under full Israeli military control as part of Israel's "Operation Iron Wall".

== History ==
In 1950, the Tulkarm Camp was established by UNRWA in the city, comprising an area of 0.18 square kilometres (0.07 sq mi). Most of the refugees who resided in the camp came from Jaffa, Caesarea and Haifa. Today it is the second largest Palestinian refugee camp in the West Bank.

During the early months of First Intifada on 26 April 1989 Izam Omar Hasan, aged 8, was shot dead by Israeli soldiers. On the same day Samar Muhammad Manid, aged 9, was shot in the eye with a plastic bullet. He died 5 days later. In March 1990, responding to questions from a member of Knesset, Minister of Defence Yitzak Rabin stated the army was active in Tulkarm at the time of the deaths and that in the case of the 9-year-old the Military Police Investigation was continuing; in the case of the 8-year-old an officer was reprimanded for firing five plastic bullets breaking operational orders, but it could not be established if he killed the boy because no autopsy was carried out. On 31 May Muhammad Hamadan, aged 8 months, was shot dead by soldiers while being carried by his mother in Tulkarm refugee camp.

In 2023, the IDF launched a raid on the camp as part of the Middle Eastern crisis.

On 3 October 2024 the Israeli military carried out an airstrike on the camp, killing 20 people.
