= Nur Shams =

- Refugee camp

Arabic transcription(s)
  - Arabic: مخيّم نور شمس
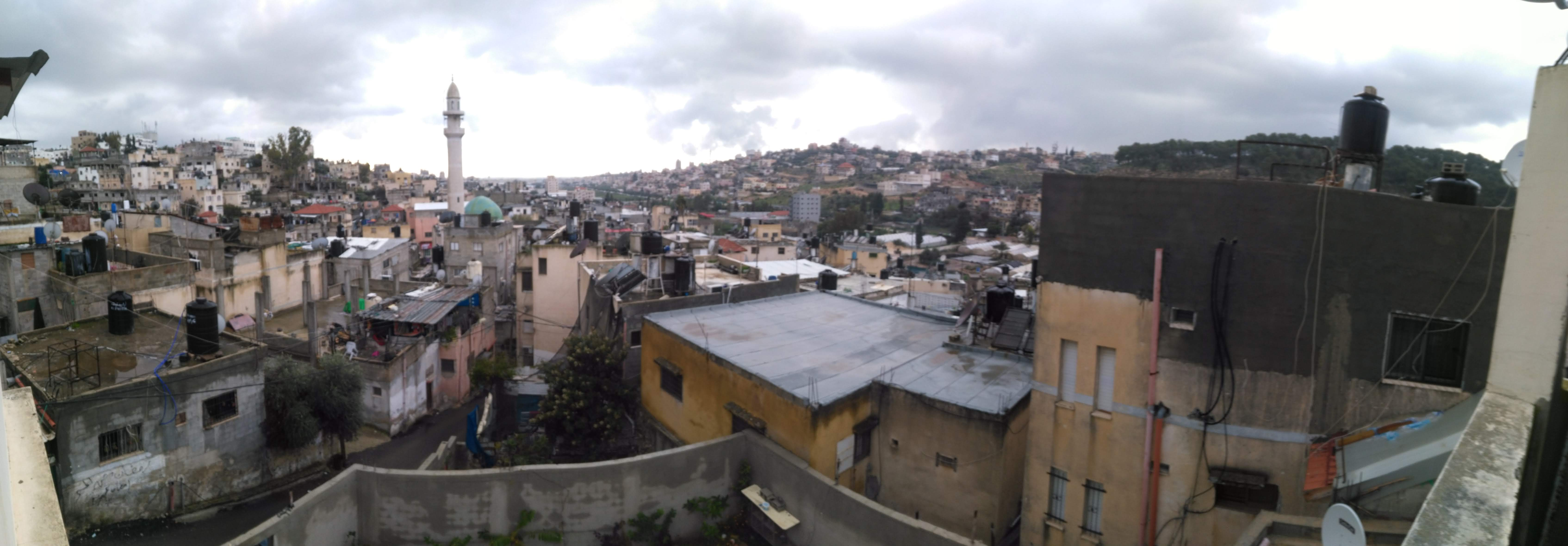
- Nur Shams Refugee Camp

- Location of Nur Shams within Palestine
- Coordinates: 32°19′07″N 35°03′32″E
- State: State of Palestine
- Governorate: Tulkarm

Government
  - Type: Refugee Camp
  - Control: Israel

Area
  - Total: 226 dunams (22.6 ha; 56 acres)

Population (2017)
  - Total: 6,423
  - Density: 28,400/km^{2} (73,600/sq mi)

Nur Shams (Arabic: مخيّم نور شمس) is a Palestinian refugee camp in the Tulkarm Governorate in the northwestern West Bank, located three kilometres (1.9 mi) east of Tulkarm. According to the Palestinian Central Bureau of Statistics, Nur Shams had a population of 6,479 inhabitants in 2007 and 6,423 by 2017. 95.1% of the population of Nur Shams were refugees in 1997. The UNRWA-run healthcare facility for Nur Shams camp was re-built in 1996 with contributions from the Government of Germany.

Historian Benny Morris describes it as having been "a lonely and exclusively Arab area" in early 1936. During the Mandate period, a British detention camp was situated at Nur Shams.

Nur Shams camp was established in 1952 on 226 dunums. The camp was transferred to Palestinian Authority control in November 1998, after the signing of the Wye River Memorandum and the first phase of further Israeli redeployment.

A four-story Boys' school was constructed in 2004 and has 1035 pupils, the girls' school was constructed in 2001 and has 975 pupils. The two schools in the camp are in poor condition and are listed on UNRWA's priority list for replacement pending securing of funds to carry out the project.

In 2023, the IDF entered the camp. In 2025, Israeli military control was established as part of Israel's "Operation Iron Wall". During the operation 280 houses (~35% of the buildings) were either destroyed or damaged. In December 2025 Israeli authorities destroyed 25 building housed 70 families.

== See also ==
- Palestinian refugee camps
