= Israeli incursions in the West Bank during the Gaza war =

Series of Israeli military engagements in the occupied West Bank

- Part of the Israeli–Palestinian conflict, the Gaza war and the Middle Eastern crisis (2023–present)
- West Bank Palestinian enclaves (Areas A & B) West Bank under Israeli control (Area C) Israeli-annexed Jerusalem/East Jerusalem See here for a more detailed map.
Date	11 October 2023 – present (3 years, 3 weeks and 1 day)
Location	Israeli-occupied West Bank with spillover into Israel
Status	Ongoing: Israel establishes full military control over the Jenin, Nur Shams, and Tulkarm refugee camps.

Belligerents
Israel	Palestinian Joint Operations Room; Al-Aqsa Martyrs' Brigades; Palestinian Islamic Jihad; Hamas; Popular Front for the Liberation of Palestine; Democratic Front for the Liberation of Palestine; Popular Resistance Committees; Palestinian Mujahideen Movement	(Palestine) Palestinian Authority

Units involved
Israel Defense Forces; Israeli Ground Forces; Northern Command; 36th Division; Etzioni Brigade; Central Command; 98th Paratroopers Division; Oz Brigade; Duvdevan Unit; 99th Infantry Division; Kfir Brigade; Combat Intelligence Collection Corps; 636th Unit; Israeli Air Force; Israel Police; Israel Border Police; (Israel) Shin Bet; (Israel) Armed Israeli settlers	(Palestine) Palestinian Joint Operations Room; Al-Aqsa Martyrs' Brigades; Khalil al-Rahman Brigade; Hornets' Nest; Qalqilya Battalion; Special Unit; Al-Quds Brigades; al-Qassam Brigades; Qabatiya Battalion; Abu Ali Mustafa Brigades; Dheisheh camp guards; National Resistance Brigades; Al-Nasser Salah al-Deen Brigades; Mujahideen Brigades; Lions' Den; Nablus Brigade; Nur Shams Brigade; Tubas Brigade; Jenin Brigades; Rapid Response Battalion; Jerusalem Brigades; Biddya Brigades; Al-Ayyash Battalion; Salfit Battalion; Youth of Revenge and Liberation; Other militants	Palestinian Security Services; Palestinian National Security Forces; Palestinian Civil Police Force

Casualties and losses
17+ soldiers killed (Note: Sources:); 35+ soldiers injured (Note: Sources:); 2+ police officers killed (Note: Sources:); 10+ policemen wounded (Note: Sources:); 3 armed settlers injured 2 alleged Israel-alligned spies killed	Around 930 militants killed (per Israel)	1 officer killed 4 officers injured Per the PA: Several security personnel killed by the IDF
- Per Al Jazeera (Note: As of April 2026): 1,151 Palestinians killed 11,885+ injured 23,000+ arrested (Note: as of 1 April 2026, at least 9,560 Palestinians are being held in Israeli jails, 3,532 of whom are being detained without charges)

During the Gaza war, Israeli forces have carried out multiple ground incursions, occasionally accompanied by airstrikes, into several Palestinian cities and refugee camps in the Israeli-occupied West Bank, including Jenin and Tulkarm. The Israeli incursions have led to clashes with Palestinian militants. At least 806 West Bank Palestinians have been killed by Israel since the conflict began, including 143 children. The United Nations recorded more than 800 Israeli settler attacks on Palestinians between October 2023 and May 2024. Israel arrested an estimated 10,000 West Bank Palestinians between 7 October 2023 and August 2024. On 15 December, Doctors Without Borders reported 2023 was the deadliest year for Palestinians in the West Bank in recorded history.

== Background ==
Tensions and violence between Palestinians and Israelis in the West Bank were escalating long before the start of the 2023 war. According to the UN, 2022 was the deadliest year for Palestinians on record, and the year to September 2023 already represented the deadliest year in history for children in the West Bank.

== Incursions into Jenin ==
=== October 2023 ===
On 12 October 2023, Israel conducted a raid in Jenin, West Bank, resulting in the reported detention of a Hamas fighter and injuries to other individuals. On 14 October 2023, another raid was launched in the city, leading to the deaths of multiple people.

On 22 October 2023, an airstrike carried out by the Israel Defense Forces targeted Hamas and Palestinian Islamic Jihad groups organising an "imminent terror attack" at the Al-Ansar Mosque, causing extensive damage. Two people were killed, and three others were injured. The IDF asserted that Hamas and Palestinian Islamic Jihad (PIJ) had been operating from a compound beneath the mosque. The Palestinian Foreign Minister, Riyad al-Maliki, characterized the attack as a "dangerous escalation in the use of warplanes" and expressed concern over the adoption of tactics from Gaza.

On 27 October, Ayser Mohammad Al-Amer, a senior commander of the Palestinian Islamic Jihad, was reportedly killed during a clash with the IDF. On 29 October, the IDF removed the Jenin Horse, a monument built in 2003 out of scrap metal, including pieces of the Palestine Red Crescent ambulance where Khalil Suleiman was killed by the IDF. On 30 October, Israeli forces again raided Jenin, engaging in fighting that reportedly killed two Palestinians.

=== November 2023 ===
On 17 November, the IDF reportedly engaged in clashes with militants from the Al-Quds Brigades and the Al-Aqsa Martyrs Brigades in Jenin over several hours. This confrontation resulted in the deaths of five individuals, including three Hamas fighters and two civilians. Another clash occurred on 29 November, during which the IDF reportedly clashed with PIJ militants, leading to the death of two militants.

On 29 November, the IDF killed Muhammad al-Zubaidi, a prominent militant leader of the Jenin Battalion responsible for coordinating the efforts of armed groups in the Jenin Camp. Wissam Ziad Hanoun was also killed. During the raid suspects threw explosive devices at IDF soldiers and they responded with live fire. CCTV footage depicting the killings show 14-year old Basel Abu Al-Wafa being shot at multiple times, sustaining mortal wounds while 8-year old Adam Al-Ghool was killed with a shot to the head.

=== December 2023 ===
On 5 December, clashes resulted in the injury of five Palestinians. On 6 December, a violent confrontation with the IDF resulted in the death of one teenage protester and injuries to two others. On 12 December, five Palestinians were killed, while another man was killed later that day. On 13 December, a Palestinian protester was killed, and two others along with a child were wounded by Israeli gunfire. On 14 December, Israel stated its forces had arrested 60 wanted individuals, confiscated more than 50 weapons, discovered explosives and funds exceeding NIS 100,000, and uncovered underground shafts, explosives labs, and observation posts. According to IDF statements, forces reportedly destroyed infrastructure, seized ammunition, and targeted two squads with the air force, resulting in seven reported deaths and injuries. Over ten individuals, and a total of 12 Palestinians were killed in reported clashes. A 17-year-old was reportedly shot and killed by IDF forces inside the Khalil Suleiman hospital compound near the Jenin refugee camp, according to accounts by the Doctors Without Borders. A female Israeli soldier shot and killed a Palestinian man on 22 December for attempting to move his car. Raids on 24 December in Jenin and multiple other areas in the West Bank resulted in more than ten arrests. At least ten houses were raided on 25 December.

=== January 2024 ===
A dozen raids were reported on 2 January, with a violent raid in Jenin and violent confrontations in Azzun, resulting in the death of four Palestinians. Raids were reported in Ya'bad on 5 January, with an 11-year-old wounded. A doctor described a drone strike on 7 January, stating one man "was decapitated. It seemed the missile directly hit him. Others had their limbs severed." All entrances into Jenin were reported blocked on 9 January. The chair of the Jenin high-level committee stated Israel had destroyed streets, electric poles, water lines, and a monument to Shireen Abu Akleh. The British charity Action Around Bethlehem Children with Disability stated it had been damaged by Israeli forces.

On 13 January, Israeli soldiers surrounded the Al Amal Hospital, searching ambulances. A young man was killed during a raid and his brother was arrested on 25 January. The IDF destroyed roundabouts on 28 January. Three young men were reportedly beaten severely by IDF troops in a raid on Ya'bad on 29 January. On 30 January, an additional three young Palestinian men, claimed by the IDF to be militants, were assassinated in a Jenin hospital by Israeli commandos disguised in medical uniforms. The men were reportedly killed in their beds while they were asleep. Some legal analysis have remarked that these actions might constitute a war crime.

=== February 2024 ===
Two young men in their late-twenties were hospitalized after being beaten for several hours by Israeli soldiers and left in an olive grove. A raid on 13 February destroyed infrastructure, including water, sewage, and internet networks. A young man was killed by Israeli forces on 13 February, after the soldiers refused to allow medical personnel to reach him. Clashes were reported in Qabatiya after Israeli forces destroyed people's property and vehicles. Israeli Army Radio stated that three Palestinians were killed in an air raid on 20 February. A 25-year-old was killed on 21 February. A strike on 22 February killed one and wounded 15; two more people died from this strike in the following days. The Israeli forces put the village of Jalbun under military lockdown after Israeli demolitions of Palestinian shacks led to confrontations and an arrest.

=== March 2024 ===
An 18-year-old boy died from gunshot wounds to the head on 5 March. Two were killed during a raid on 12 March. Israeli forces opened fire on the Jenin Government Hospital wounding civilians standing in front of the emergency department and killing two. An Israeli airstrike killed three people on 21 March, the second airstrike in less than a month. Doctors reported four casualties following an Israeli drone raid on 27 March. Al Jazeera English reported Israel's "frequent use of drones to kill Palestinians." A 19-year-old was reported dead from serious gunshot wounds. According to the official Palestinian news agency, a 13-year-old was shot and killed by Israeli forces in Qabatiya.

=== May 2024 ===
Authorities stated a teacher and a doctor, as well as two teenagers, were among seven people killed on 21 May 2024. The Palestinian Red Crescent Society posted footage reportedly showing Israeli troops preventing medics from transporting a wounded person. Defense for Children International called on the U.S. to stop providing arms used to kill children after Israeli snipers killed two 15-year-old boys. Verified footage from the raid showed Israeli forces abusing stripped Palestinian men.

=== June 2024 ===
In mid-June 2024, Israeli forces reportedly beat a young man from Jenin into unconsciousness.

=== January 2025 ===
On 21 January, Israeli forces launched an operation in Jenin, with Palestinian media reported that several airstrikes targeted the city and the refugee camp as well as a raid by Israeli soldiers, killing at least ten Palestinians and nearly 40 others were injured. On 23 January, two Palestinians were killed during an Israeli raid, with Israeli forces stated that both of them were members of the Palestinian Islamic Jihad and were wanted for perpetrating an attack earlier that month which killed three Israelis. On 30 January, two Palestinians were killed by Israeli forces inside the Jenin refugee camp.

=== February 2025 ===
On 1 February, five Palestinians, including a teenager, were killed by Israeli drone strikes in the city.

=== September 2025 ===
On 8 September, Israeli forces in Jenin killed two 14 year old Palestinian boys during a raid. On 24 September, a 19-year-old man was killed during an Israeli raid near Anzah, Jenin after the IDF claimed that he "threw an explosive device" at them.

=== May 2026 ===
On 16 May, a 34-year-old Palestinian man was killed after Israeli forces raided and opened fire at the Jenin refugee camp. The IDF later stated that Israeli soldiers shot him after the man tried to "infiltrate" the area, wherein "the soldiers are operating, and the entry is prohibited".

== Incursions into Tulkarm ==
The Israeli military conducted invasions and operations on the West Bank city of Tulkarm and the city's two camps (Tulkarm camp and Nur Shams camp) in 2023 and 2024, in part due to the city being the stronghold of the Tulkarm Brigade. The invasions of the city took place before and during the October 7 attacks that erupted on October 7, 2023. The Israeli invasion of Tulkarm was met with Palestinian, Arab, Islamic, and international condemnation. One of the largest incursions occurred on October 19, 2023, which lasted for about thirty continuous hours, leaving thirteen Palestinians dead and more than thirty wounded, as well as causing extensive destruction to homes, streets and infrastructure. The incursion on January 3, 2024, which lasted for about 40 hours, was also significant. Additional prominent incursion include the incursion on January 17, 2024, which lasted for about 45 continuous hours, leaving eight Palestinians dead and causing massive destruction, while the incursion of April 18, 2024 lasted for more than 60 continuous hours, leaving a large number of Palestinian citizens dead and causing immense destruction. The continuous incursion on Tulkarm represented the largest, longest, most extensive, and most destructive invasions on the West Bank since the Second Intifada.

The Israeli invasion of Tulkarm coincided with statements made by Israeli officials calling for the destruction of the city. On May 29, 2024, Israeli Finance Minister Bezalel Smotrich said that "terror must be eliminated everywhere, even if it means turning Tulkarm into a city like Gaza"; on May 30, 2024, Smotrich also said that "if terrorism continues, we will turn Tulkarm into a city like the Gaza Strip"; and on July 4, 2024, Smotrich again called for the destruction of Tulkarm, saying: "Tulkarm must become a city of ruins".

=== March 2023 ===
==== March 10, 2023 operation ====
On March 10, 2023, Israel announced a military operation in the city of Tulkarm, which includes the headquarters of the Tulkarm Brigade. Violent armed clashes broke out in the city at dawn between members of the brigade and the invading Israeli army forces. The clashes included members of the Tulkarm Brigade targeting Israeli army forces with explosive devices. The Tulkarm Brigade said in a brief statement at dawn that its members "are fighting the battle of the martyrs on the land of the city of Tulkarm. The sons of the Rapid Response are still fighting the battle of dignity and have inflicted casualties and losses on the enemy".

=== May 2023 ===
==== May 6, 2023 operation ====
On the morning of May 6, 2023, Israeli special forces carried out a military operation in Tulkarm camp in Tulkarm city and assassinated two Palestinians from the Qassam Brigades in Tulkarm Brigade after clashing with them. They were "Samir Salah al-Shafi'i" (22 years old) and "Hamza Jamil Khrioush" (22 years old). Israel accused them of carrying out several shooting operations against various checkpoints, settlements, and Israeli vehicles in the Tulkarm area.

==== May 11, 2023 incursion ====
At dawn on May 11, 2023, Israel launched a large-scale military operation in the Nur Shams camp in the city of Tulkarm against the Tulkarm Brigade. The operation lasted for four hours with the participation of more than 200 Israeli soldiers. The operation left widespread destruction in the camp and resulted in the death of a 66-year-old Palestinian citizen.

==== May 30, 2023 incursion ====
At dawn on May 30, 2023, Israel launched a large-scale military operation in the Nur Shams camp against the Tulkarm Brigade. At the time of the operation, this storming of the camp was the largest in years, and the military operation lasted for more than five hours while involving large Israeli military reinforcements and the assistance of bulldozers and reconnaissance aircraft. During the storming, an Israeli soldier from the Duvdevan Unit was moderately injured by an explosion caused by a homemade explosive device detonated by the Tulkarm Brigade.

=== July 2023 ===
==== July 24, 2023 incursion ====
At dawn and during the morning of Monday, July 24, 2023, Israel invaded the Nur Shams camp in the city of Tulkarm against the Tulkarm Brigade with more than 60 military vehicles, representing the largest raid on the city at the time since the Second Intifada. The Israeli forces destroyed the streets of the camp by bulldozing them with military bulldozers, with the invasion resulted in thirteen injuries on the Palestinian side. The Tulkarm Brigade also detonated explosive devices on Israeli vehicles in the city, including a highly explosive device on an Israeli military bulldozer, which damaged it. Immediately after the withdrawal of the Israeli forces and the widespread destruction in its wake, Palestinian President Mahmoud Abbas issued instructions to undo the damage caused by the invasion. Crews from the Tulkarm Municipality, the Ministry of Public Works, the Ministry of Local Government, the Civil Defense, and the Energy Authority began working to repair the destroyed roads, water, electricity, and sewage lines. Following the Israeli withdrawal, the camp was inspected by the Minister of Local Government Majdi Al-Saleh, and the Director General of Civil Defense Major General Al-Abd Ibrahim Khalil, at the behest of the Palestinian Prime Minister Mohammad Shtayyeh, and under the directives of the Palestinian President, Mahmoud Abbas.

=== August 2023 ===
==== August 4, 2023 incursion ====
At dawn on Friday, August 4, 2023, Israel invaded the city of Tulkarm and the Tulkarm camp in the city. During the invasion, a Palestinian was killed in the area surrounding the flagpole square in the city.

During the invasion, violent clashes broke out between the Israeli army and the Palestinian Tulkarm Brigade, and the Israeli army deployed its snipers in several buildings in and around Tulkarm camp, while the Tulkarm Brigade detonated explosive devices in Tulkarm camp.

==== August 11, 2023 incursion ====
At dawn on Friday, August 11, 2023, the Israeli army invaded the city of Tulkarm and the Tulkarm camp in the city. During the invasion, a Palestinian was killed in the Al-Maslakh Street area of the city, and 8 other Palestinians were injured during the invasion, one of whom was described as critically injured. Violent clashes took place in the Tulkarm camp between the Israeli army and the Tulkarm Brigade.

The Tulkarm Brigade stated: "Our heroic mujahideen continue to target the occupation forces and vehicles storming Tulkarm camp with heavy volleys of bullets and explosive devices on several fronts". The Tulkarm Brigade added: "Our mujahideen in the engineering unit were able to detonate a number of explosive devices in the occupation vehicles and hit them directly". The brigade also said: "With the determination of the true believers, our mujahideen were able to target an occupation army position inside Tulkarm camp with direct volleys of bullets, and our mujahideen were able to target the occupation snipers' positions inside the camp with heavy volleys of bullets".

The head of the Palestinian National Council, Rawhi Fattouh, commented on what happened in Tulkarm, warning of an escalation of the situation by saying: "The continuation of this policy will lead to an escalation of the situation, and to more tension and instability that will affect everyone, and we will not suffer and pay the price alone."

==== August 20, 2023 incursion ====
Israel invaded the city of Tulkarm and the Tulkarm camp in the city at dawn on Sunday, August 20, 2023, which resulted in four Palestinians being injured with various injuries. The invasion lasted for more than two hours.

The Israeli army deployed its snipers in various neighborhoods and areas of the city, and the wounded Palestinians were transferred to Martyr Dr. Thabet Thabet Governmental Hospital and Al-Israa Specialized Hospital in the city.

==== August 27, 2023 incursion ====
At dawn on Sunday, August 27, 2023, the Israeli army invaded the city of Tulkarm and the Tulkarm camp in the city. During the invasion, five Palestinians were injured, and the invasion continued for more than four continuous hours, with the participation of dozens of Israeli military vehicles.

The Israeli army sent new military reinforcements to the city of Tulkarm and the Tulkarm camp in the city, while violent armed clashes took place around Thabet Thabet Hospital in the center of the city simultaneously with violent clashes in the Tulkarm camp.

The Tulkarm Brigade reported that it had engaged in violent clashes with the Israeli army in Tulkarm camp. The Tulkarm Brigade said in a statement: "Our fighters were able to confront with all their might the occupation forces and vehicles that had penetrated the camp and targeted them with heavy and direct volleys of bullets. They carried out a number of ambushes and detonated a number of highly explosive (Saif 1) bombs on more than one axis. With God's help and empowerment, the engineering unit in the brigade detonated a number of (Saif 1) bombs in the occupation vehicles, causing direct damage to them and directly damaging a vehicle".

=== September 2023 ===
==== September 5, 2023 incursion ====
Israel invaded the city of Tulkarm and the city's Nur Shams camp at dawn on Tuesday, September 5, 2023, using more than 80 Israeli military vehicles that included bulldozers. The invasion resulted in the killing of a Palestinian and the injury of two others, one of whom was in critical condition.

Israeli bulldozers razed the streets and infrastructure in the camp. Palestinian Minister of Public Works and Housing Muhammad Ziyara said on September 5, 2023, that "under the directives of the Palestinian President and Prime Minister, the Ministry's crews began early hours to open the roads and assess the damage to the infrastructure and streets".

==== September 24, 2023 incursion ====
At dawn on Sunday, September 24, 2023, Israel returned and invaded the city of Tulkarm in addition to the city's Nour Shams camp. This invasion led to the killing of two Palestinians by Israeli forces, while an Israeli soldier was wounded during the invasion.

Israeli bulldozers destroyed infrastructure and streets in Nour Shams camp, and Palestinian Minister of Public Works and Housing Muhammad Ziyara said: "Under the directives of President Mahmoud Abbas, crews began, since the morning hours, to open roads, secure buildings, and assess the damage to infrastructure and streets".

On September 24, 2023, the General Secretariat of the Organization of Islamic Cooperation said in response to the Israeli invasion of Tulkarm that it "strongly condemns the escalation of crimes committed by the Israeli occupation forces in the occupied Palestinian territory, which today led to the martyrdom of two Palestinian youths and the destruction of infrastructure in the Nour Shams refugee camp east of Tulkarm". The organization said that "these Israeli attacks constitute war crimes and crimes against humanity". The organization also called on "the international community to pressure Israel, the occupying power, to put an end to its repeated crimes and violations and to provide international protection for the Palestinian people".

The Union of Radio and Television of the Organization of Islamic Cooperation also condemned this Israeli invasion of Tulkarm, according to a statement issued by the Union on September 24, 2023.

=== October 2023 ===
On Thursday, 19 October 2023, at 3 a.m., Israeli forces conducted a raid in Tulkarm, focusing on Nur Shams, various neighborhoods, and the Tulkarm camp. A 15-year-old boy and his father were killed by snipers. In the Nur Shams camp, a drone deployed by Israel resulted in casualties among a group of Palestinians. Four children and eight young men were killed in the airstrike. The Israeli army reported the death of one officer and injuries to nine soldiers due to the detonation of an explosive device in the Nour Shams camp, with the wounded soldiers transported to the Meir Hospital.

On the second day of the raid, Friday, 20 October 2023, explosions occurred at dawn and in the morning hours. The Tulkarm Battalion reported that additional armed groups had reached Tulkarm to support their efforts. The Palestinian Ministry of Health confirmed 13 casualties, including 5 children, with the deceased and injured transported to Martyr Dr. Thabet Thabet Governmental Hospital.

==== October 5, 2023 incursion ====
Two days before Hamas launched its incursion into Israel, Israeli forces invaded the Tulkarm refugee camp in Tulkarm on October 5, 2023. According to the Israeli military, this invasion resulted in five Israeli soldiers being injured by bomb explosions, three of whom were seriously injured and two of whom were moderately injured.

==== October 19–20, 2023 incursion ====
On the thirteenth day of the Hamas attack on Israel, Israel launched a large-scale military operation on Tulkarm and the city's two camps (Nour Shams Camp and Tulkarm Camp). During the operation, thirteen Palestinians were killed and a number of others were injured, while an Israeli officer was killed and nine other soldiers were injured.

=== November 2023 ===
On 2 November 2023, an Israeli reserve soldier in a civilian vehicle was ambushed by militants in Beit Lid and fatally shot.

==== November 1, 2023 storming operation ====
At dawn on Wednesday, November 1, 2023, Israel stormed the city of Tulkarm, which led to the outbreak of violent armed clashes. During the storming, a Palestinian citizen was killed by Israeli army bullets.

==== November 6, 2023 military operation ====
On November 6, 2023, the Israeli Yamam forces carried out a special operation in the city of Tulkarm, during which they assassinated Jihad Shehadeh, the commander of the Tulkarm Brigade Rapid Response Group, by firing about 100 bullets at the vehicle he was riding in. He was accompanied in the vehicle by Izz al-Din Raed Awad, the commander of the Tulkarm Brigade Al-Qassam Group, and the brigade members Moamen Saed Balawi and Qassem Muhammad Rajab. Their four bodies arrived at Thabet Thabet Hospital in the city of Tulkarm with several features missing and their limbs scattered due to the intensity of the bullets that were fired at them at point-blank range. Their deaths were announced by the Palestinian Ministry of Health.

==== November 13–14, 2023 incursion ====
On the evening of November 13, 2023, Israel launched a large-scale military operation to invade several neighborhoods of Tulkarm city, including Tulkarm camp in the center of the city. The invasion continued for two days, lasting sixteen continuous hours. During the invasion, seven Palestinians were killed and twelve others were injured, four of whom were seriously injured according to the Palestinian Ministry of Health. Dozens also suffered from asphyxia.

===== First day of the incursion (November 13, 2023) =====
Israel began its invasion of the city of Tulkarm at approximately 10:00 pm PSST on Monday, November 13, 2023, with Israeli special forces storming the city primarily in the vicinity of the Tulkarm camp. A clash broke out, killing two Palestinians. This was followed by the entry of Israeli army forces into the city from the Khadouri crossing with dozens of military vehicles and bulldozers.

===== Second day of the incursion (November 14, 2023) =====
At dawn, Israeli forces began using their military bulldozers to raze several streets in the city's neighborhoods and in Tulkarm camp, destroying Palestinian infrastructure and vehicles. Suicide drones also bombed several targets inside Tulkarm camp, killing and wounding a number of Palestinians. On the morning of the same day, Israeli bulldozers began demolishing several memorials in the city; they destroyed the stone columns at the entrance to Tulkarm camp and completely destroyed the Yasser Arafat monument in the Zenobia Junction area of the city.

On the afternoon of the same day, the violent clashes extended to the city center area, and Israeli forces fired tear gas canisters towards Thabet Thabet Hospital, which led to "dozens of citizens and medical staff suffering from suffocation," according to a statement by the Palestinian Ministry of Health, before Israeli forces withdrew from the city.

==== November 21–22, 2023 incursion ====
Coinciding with the ongoing Israeli invasion of the Gaza Strip, Israel returned and invaded the neighborhoods of Tulkarm city, including Tulkarm camp. This invasion resulted in the killing of six Palestinians and the injury of many others.

At 11:30 p.m. PSST on the evening of Tuesday, November 21, 2023, Israel invaded Tulkarm city, including Tulkarm camp. At dawn on Wednesday, November 22, 2023, Israeli forces bulldozed streets inside and around Tulkarm camp in the city using military bulldozers. Israeli suicide drones also bombed several targets inside Tulkarm camp, killing several Palestinians.

During the invasion, Israeli forces imposed a comprehensive siege around Thabet Thabet Hospital and Al-Israa Specialized Hospital in the city. They also stormed the emergency department of Thabet Thabet Hospital and arrested one of the wounded patients inside. Israeli forces also searched multiple ambulances transporting the wounded to the city's hospitals.

==== November 30, 2023 incursion ====
At approximately 1:00 AM PSST on Thursday, November 30, 2023, Israeli forces, accompanied by heavy military bulldozers and tracked vehicles, invaded the city of Tulkarm and its neighborhoods, including the Tulkarm camp. This invasion continued until 7:30 a.m., and resulted in the arrest of ten Palestinians from various parts of the city. This invasion of Tulkarm coincided with the 2023 Gaza war ceasefire.

During the invasion, Israeli forces surrounded the Thabet Thabet Governmental Hospital in the city, intercepted and searched several ambulances, and subjected their drivers to interrogation. They deployed snipers on the roofs of tall buildings in the city, and toured and stormed various streets and neighborhoods in the city. They dropped leaflets demanding that those wanted by Israel surrender themselves. Israeli military bulldozers also completely razed several streets in the eastern neighborhood of the city, which led to the destruction of city infrastructure and water, sewage, electricity, and communications networks. Following the Israeli withdrawal on the same day, the Minister of Local Government, Majdi al-Saleh, and the Mayor of Tulkarm, Riyad Awad, visit the destroyed streets to investigate their conditions.

=== December 2023 ===
Five were killed on 17 December, while ambulances were prevented from reaching the wounded, and paramedics were arrested. On 20 December 2023, Israeli forces raided the town of Attil. On 23 December, bulldozers entered Tulkarem and clashes were reported between Palestinian and Israeli forces. On 24 December, homemade explosives were reportedly used against the IDF. More than 100 Israeli army vehicles raided Nur Shams on 25 December. An overnight drone strike was reported on 27 December, with a paramedic stating he found bodies of "men lying everywhere".December 6–7, 2023 incursion

Israeli forces returned to invade Tulkarm again, several days after their previous invasion. At approximately 11:40 PM PSST on Wednesday, December 6, 2023, Israel invaded the city's neighborhoods and two camps (Tulkarm Camp and Nour Shams Camp) with a large number of military vehicles and bulldozers. The invasion continued until approximately 7:30 AM on Thursday, December 7, 2023. During the invasion, Israel sent additional military reinforcements to the city.

During the invasion, Israeli military bulldozers razed streets in the city and its two camps, caused power outages in several neighborhoods and large areas in the city. The Israeli army also surrounded the Thabet Thabet Governmental Hospital in the center of the city and prevented ambulances and medical crews from leaving it. The Israeli army searched Palestinian ambulances in the city streets.

During the invasion, the Tulkarm Brigade Rapid Response Group announced that it had injured two Israeli soldiers in Tulkarm camp during violent clashes. The Tulkarm Brigade also said in a statement: "Our soldiers are still confronting the occupation forces throughout the city".

==== December 16–17, 2023 incursion ====
Israel invaded the city of Tulkarm and the city's two camps (Tulkarm camp and Nour Shams camp) Saturday evening, December 16, 2023, with several military vehicles accompanied by military bulldozers. The invasion continued until approximately 9:30 a.m. on Sunday, December 17, 2023. This invasion resulted in the killing of five Palestinians in the Nour Shams camp, some of whom were killed by aerial bombardment from drones, while others were injured.

During the invasion, violent clashes broke out between the Israeli army and the Tulkarm Brigade fighters, and Israeli military bulldozers razed several streets and infrastructure in the city's two camps, leaving "massive destruction." Israeli forces also partially destroyed four houses in the Nour Shams camp, and the Israeli army deployed snipers on the roofs of tall buildings in various parts of the city. Mosques in Tulkarm called on citizens via loudspeakers to confront the Israeli forces.

The Israeli army confirmed in a statement that it "carried out air operations in Tulkarm targeting a number of armed terrorist groups that opened fire, threw explosives, and threatened the lives of the forces."

The Palestine Red Crescent Society said that "the occupation forces prevented ambulance crews from entering the Nour Shams camp to transport the injured, despite coordination through the International Committee of the Red Cross".

The Tulkarm Brigade said that its fighters targeted Israeli forces on all fronts of the city, and that it had repeatedly ambushed Israeli soldiers and their vehicles with explosive devices. The Tulkarm Brigade statement read: "Our soldiers are now confronting the Israeli forces storming the city of Tulkarm and its camps using Amir 1 explosive devices. Our fighters are targeting the occupation forces on all fronts and repeatedly ambushed enemy soldiers".

The Tulkarm Brigade managed to detonate an Israeli armored vehicle with an explosive device, which destroyed parts of it and caused debris to fall from it, forcing the Israeli army to withdraw it from Tulkarm. The Tulkarm Brigade said: "The explosive device directly hit the Tiger vehicle, which led to its detonation. These are its remains. This vehicle is known for transporting occupation soldiers. We confirm that the soldiers who were inside it were injured, despite the enemy's concealment".

The Egyptian House of Representatives strongly condemned the Israeli storming of Tulkarm. The head of the Arab Affairs Committee in the House of Representatives, Egyptian MP Ahmed Fouad Abaza, said: "The storming of Tulkarm by large forces of the occupation army requires rapid intervention from the international community, with all its countries and organizations in general, and the United States of America in particular, to expedite the adoption of all measures to implement Egypt's vision, led by President Abdel Fattah el-Sisi, to force the occupation government to immediately stop its attacks against the Palestinians".

The national and Islamic forces in Tulkarm Governorate announced a comprehensive strike in all aspects of life for Sunday, December 17, 2023, in condemnation of the invasion and mourning for the souls of the Palestinian dead. With this invasion, the number of Palestinians killed by the Israeli army in Tulkarm since October 7, 2023 had reached 51.

==== December 23–24, 2023 incursion ====
At 10:40 p.m. PSST on the evening of Saturday, December 23, 2023, Israel invaded the city of Tulkarm and the city's two camps with dozens of military vehicles accompanied by "D9" military bulldozers coming from the city's western axis (Crossing 104). This invasion continued until 6:30 a.m. on the morning of Sunday, December 24, 2023 on Christmas Eve.

The Israeli army sent more military reinforcements amidst violent clashes between the army and the Palestinian Tulkarm Brigade. The invasion left behind destruction in the streets and infrastructure of the Nour Shams camp after it was leveled by Israeli military bulldozers. The bulldozers also destroyed a section of the city's "Younis Roundabout," and also destroyed private cars and civil and governmental facilities.

==== December 25–26, 2023 incursion ====
Only a few hours after the Israeli army withdrew from Tulkarm in the previous invasion, the Israeli army returned and invaded the city and its two camps at approximately 11:10 p.m. PSST on Monday evening, December 25, 2023, with dozens of military vehicles and military bulldozers. This invasion continued until approximately 8:00 am on Tuesday morning, December 26, 2023.

During the invasion, Israeli bulldozers destroyed walls, vehicles and streets in Nour Shams camp, while a UN vehicle was destroyed in the camp. The Israeli army blew up three Palestinian homes in the camp, and bombed a building under construction near the "Hamdallah Water Well" in the city with Energa missiles.

==== December 27, 2023 incursion ====
Only a few hours after the previous Israeli withdrawal from the city of Tulkarm, the Israeli army returned and invaded the city and its two camps with dozens of military vehicles, wheeled and tracked military bulldozers at approximately 12:00 a.m. PSST on Wednesday morning, December 27, 2023. The invasion continued until approximately 7:15 a.m. in the morning of the same day, and resulted in the killing of six Palestinians in an airstrike in the Nour Shams camp, as well as the injury of multiple Palestinians.

The invasion began with the Israeli army storming the city center, including the Orthodox Church, Khadouri Street, Gamal Abdel Nasser Square, and an old garage complex, occurring in parallel with storming the city's Nour Shams camp. The invasion then extended to the city's Tulkarm camp, with Israeli military bulldozers destroying infrastructure.

During the invasion, the Israeli army bombed a target inside the Nour Shams camp with drones, killing six Palestinians and wounding others. The Israeli army also bombed an abandoned house in the city's employee housing neighborhood with Energa shells and blew up a Palestinian vehicle.

The Palestinian Red Crescent Society stated that the Israeli forces prevented its crews from reaching the Nour Shams camp. The Thabet Thabet Governmental Hospital in the city announced the arrival of all Palestinian victims and wounded from the invasion to the hospital an hour after the Israeli army prevented ambulances from reaching the hospital.

The Palestinian factions in Tulkarm had declared a comprehensive strike day for all aspects of life in Tulkarm Governorate in mourning and condemnation of the invasion.

Agence France-Presse reported that the Israeli army refused to immediately comment on its military operation in Tulkarm.

The Organization of Islamic Cooperation released a statement on December 27, 2023 commenting on the Israeli invasion of Tulkarm, saying that it "strongly condemns the continued crimes of military aggression carried out by the Israeli occupation against the Palestinian people, which led to the martyrdom of six people in the city of Tulkarm."

The United Nations published in a statement on December 28, 2023, stating that "Israel used a drone against the population in Tulkarm."

==== December 30–31, 2023 incursion ====
Israel invaded the city of Tulkarm and its two camps at approximately 10:45 p.m PSST on Saturday evening, December 30, 2023. The invasion continued until 10:00 am on Sunday, December 31, 2023, the last day of the year 2023. Dozens of Israeli military vehicles, including tracked and wheeled military bulldozers, participated in the invasion, causing immense destruction especially in the Nour Shams Camp. Several Palestinians were injured as a result of this invasion, and dozens of others were arrested.

Immediately after the Israeli army entered the city of Tulkarm, the Tulkarm Brigade issued a statement on December 30, 2023, saying, "We are fully prepared to confront this cowardly, fearful enemy who will pay dearly tonight for his crimes."

From the beginning of the invasion until its end, the Israeli army completely besieged both Al-Israa Specialized Hospital and Thabet Thabet Hospital in the city, while the army searched Palestinian ambulances heading to and from both hospitals.

During the invasion, the Israeli army bombed two sites in the Nour Shams camp with drones, resulting in Palestinian casualties. Israeli drones also bombed two sites in the Tulkarm camp, resulting in two injuries, one of which was serious.

This invasion caused massive destruction in the Nour Shams camp, including the demolition and bombing of ten houses of which some were multi-story buildings, the destruction of fifteen Palestinian vehicles, and complete destruction of the camp infrastructure. The Israeli army also destroyed Palestinian vehicles at the entrance to the Thabet Thabet Governmental Hospital in the city.

=== January 2024 ===
Five people were injured during a raid on 3 January 2024, including one person hit by a live bullet, three people beaten by Israeli soldiers, and one person who was rammed by an Israeli jeep. A 40-hour raid on Nur Shams concluded on 4 January, with more than a dozen wounded from soldier beatings. Five-hundred people were reportedly interrogated. The head of the Tulkarem camp services committee condemned an Israeli killing of three young men after video showed soldiers running over the body of one young man after shooting him dead. A seven-hour raid on Nur Shams occurred on 12 January, resulting in damage to infrastructure and leading the camp's emergency head to state, "There is no street inside the camp or alley that has not been destroyed." A teenage boy was beaten to death by Israeli soldiers on 13 January.

Three paramedics were arrested during a raid on 17 January. Five people were killed. The raid reportedly lasted more than forty hours, with homes and infrastructure destroyed and a large number of men detained. The IDF reportedly exchanged fire with local militants and uncovered explosive booby-trapped roads, damaging electricity and water lines on 30 January.

==== January 3–4, 2024 incursion ====
At approximately 12:05 a.m. PSST on Wednesday morning, January 3, 2024, Israel invaded the city of Tulkarm and the city's two camps with dozens of military vehicles accompanied by D9 bulldozers and wheeled military bulldozers. At the time, the invasion was the largest, most widespread, longest, and most destructive invasion of Tulkarm since the Second Palestinian Intifada. This invasion led to immense destruction in the two camps, and the invasion continued for approximately forty continuous hours until approximately 3:45 pm on Thursday, January 4, 2024. During the invasion, twenty-one Palestinians were injured, while Israel announced that three of its soldiers were injured, one of them seriously.

At the beginning of the invasion, the Israeli army distributed leaflets announcing a "curfew until further notice," and completely surrounded both the Al-Israa Specialized Hospital and the Thabet Thabet Hospital in the city, searching Palestinian ambulances heading to and from the hospitals, and checking the identities of all those entering and leaving the hospitals.

An Israeli army drone fired a rocket into Tulkarm camp, wounding a number of citizens. The army also opened fire on a gathering of journalists stationed opposite of the besieged Nour Shams camp.

The Israeli military bulldozers caused immense massive destruction in Tulkarm camp and Nour Shams camp, including streets, infrastructure, residential buildings, and shops. In both the Tulkarm camp and the Nour Shams camp, the Israeli army almost entirely destroyed the camp's streets and infrastructure. In Nour Shams camp, the Israeli army also blew up a hall and six houses, while destroying dozens of other houses.

In this regard, Tulkarm Mayor Riyad Awad said: "The occupation deliberately destroyed the infrastructure in Tulkarm and Nour Shams camps, which caused power outages and water network outages, due to the occupation striking a number of main lines feeding the camps, in addition to bulldozing the streets and destroying the sewage network, and wastewater began to flow into the streets". He also reported that, "The destruction of the water, electricity, sewage networks and streets constitutes a huge burden on the municipality".

A Fatah leader said, "Nour Shams camp witnessed massive destruction, as if an earthquake had struck it, and the losses amounted to tens of millions of dollars. What happened in the camp is similar to what is happening in the Gaza Strip. Houses were destroyed, they were tampered with, dozens of houses without windows or doors, the roads were completely destroyed and the infrastructure of electricity, water and sewage was bulldozed". The leader added, "Part of the [UNRWA]'s office was bulldozed and the UN flag was raised on it, without any respect for sanctity, and the mosques were also violated and desecrated".

The Commission of Prisoners' Affairs and the Palestinian Prisoners' Club confirmed that the field investigations carried out by the Israeli army against the residents of Nour Shams camp affected about 500 citizens, including children and women.

The Palestinian Red Crescent Society said that its crews dealt with twenty-one injuries, seventeen of which were related to severe beatings and fractures during field arrests of young men, three injuries from shrapnel, and one injury from live bullets. The Palestinian Red Crescent Society also said that the Israeli army prevented Palestinian ambulance crews from reaching the injured despite its prior coordination through the International Committee of the Red Cross.

The Tulkarm Brigade said that it detonated explosive devices against Israeli army forces, in addition to detonating a car bomb remotely on the main street in the Nour Shams camp directly against an Israeli force, which led to the killing and wounding of Israeli soldiers.

The Israeli army announced that three of its soldiers were injured, one of them seriously, during the invasion, and several Israeli army vehicles were damaged, forcing the army to withdraw them from Tulkarm.

==== January 8–9, 2024 incursion ====
On the evening of Monday, January 8, 2024, the joint Israeli Special Forces (the Israeli Army, the Israeli Police, and the Shin Bet) carried out an assassination operation against three young Palestinian men from the Tulkarm Brigade near the Al-Qaisi Mosque in Tulkarm. Shortly after the assassination, Israel invaded the city of Tulkarm and its two camps on the same day at approximately 11:00 PM PSST on Monday, January 8, 2024. The invasion continued until 7:00 AM on Tuesday, January 9, 2024, and resulted in the injury of nine Palestinians by Israeli shelling.

In an immediate response to the assassination, the Tulkarm Brigade announced the start of a "large-scale operation until further notice", and the Palestinian Foreign Ministry commented on the scene of an Israeli military vehicle running over one of the three Palestinian dead after killing him, saying, "Running over a Tulkarm martyr is a moral degradation and a translation of official Israeli instructions and incitement, and reflects a fascist, colonial, racist mentality", while Hamas called it a "cowardly assassination".

The invasion began with an intensive Israeli deployment in the center of Tulkarm city, with the Israeli army surrounding ambulances around Thabet Thabet Governmental Hospital in the city at the same time as the Israeli army beginning to impose a siege on Tulkarm camp. During the invasion, two Israeli bulldozers and two wheeled bulldozers began the process of leveling streets in the city of Tulkarm and inside the Tulkarm camp, such as the street leading in front of the Tulkarm Municipal Court and the Bilal bin Rabah Mosque in the city and other streets. The invasion then expanded to include the Nour Shams camp in the city, as the camp also witnessed the leveling of streets.

The Tulkarm Brigade said that it detonated explosive devices against Israeli army vehicles and soldiers, including an explosive device that targeted an Israeli military bulldozer in Tulkarm camp, causing it to be damaged, which required the Israeli army to withdraw the damaged bulldozer from Tulkarm.

During the invasion, the Israeli army bombed a house in Tulkarm camp with a drone, resulting in nine Palestinian injuries, according to the Palestinian Red Crescent.

==== January 11–12, 2024 incursion ====
At approximately 10:15 p.m. on Thursday, January 11, 2024, the Israeli army invaded the city with dozens of military vehicles accompanied by four tracked and wheeled military bulldozers. The invasion continued until approximately 7:00 am on Friday, January 12, 2024.

The invasion led to widespread destruction of streets and infrastructure inside and around the city's Nour Shams camp, and Israeli bulldozers razed a section of "Al-Sikka Street" and the area around the "Iktaba Roundabout" in the city. The Tulkarm Brigade said that it confronted the invasion in the Nour Shams camp and engaged in violent clashes.

During the invasion, the Tulkarm Brigade detonated a "highly explosive" explosive device in an Israeli D9 bulldozer in the Nour Shams camp, setting it on fire. The Tulkarm Brigade said in a statement that the bulldozer had been "taken out of service, and those inside were killed and injured." The Tulkarm Brigade also said that its engineering unit had "detonated an explosive device in a Nimr military jeep in the Nour Shams camp, which turned into a ball of flames, and achieved confirmed injuries".

==== January 17–19, 2024 incursion ====
At approximately 4:30 a.m. on Wednesday, January 17, 2024, Israel launched a massive invasion of the city of Tulkarm and the Tulkarm refugee camp in the city with dozens of Israeli military vehicles and bulldozers. The invasion extended to include the city's Nour Shams refugee camp, and continued until approximately 12:40 a.m. on Friday, January 19, 2024, for approximately 45 continuous hours. The operation represented the longest and most violent invasion of Tulkarm since the Second Intifada. The invasion resulted in the killing of eight Palestinians and the serious injury of others, while an Israeli soldier was seriously injured.

The invasion began with the Israeli army completely besieging the Tulkarm camp in the city, and Israeli military bulldozers began a complete process of leveling the camp's streets. The Israeli army also besieged Thabet Thabet Governmental Hospital and the Al-Shifa Ambulance Center in the city center, Al-Israa Specialized Hospital in the western part of the city, and the Palestinian Red Crescent Emergency and Ambulance Center in the southern part of the city, searching Palestinian ambulances.

Israeli drones bombed the city's Tulkarm camp several times during the invasion, killing four Palestinians immediately in an airstrike in Tulkarm camp. Another Palestinian was killed during violent clashes in Tulkarm camp, while a sixth Palestinian was killed near Muscat School in an Israeli shooting attack on his vehicle, a seventh Palestinian was killed in the city's Nour Shams camp, and an eighth Palestinian was killed in Tulkarm camp after he was left bleeding on the ground for hours while Israeli forces prevented an ambulance from reaching him.

Israeli drones also bombed a Palestinian ambulance belonging to the Palestinian Red Crescent Society, destroying it and injuring two of its crew members with moderate and serious injuries.

The Israeli army reported that one of its soldiers was seriously injured in the violent clashes in Tulkarm camp and was transferred to the hospital to receive medical treatment. Several Israeli army vehicles were also damaged by explosive devices detonated by the Tulkarm Brigade, which forced the army to withdraw these vehicles from Tulkarm.

The Israeli army forces launched a wide-scale arrest campaign that included dozens of residents of Tulkarm camp, and transferred them to a field investigation center on Al-Sikka Street. The Israeli bulldozers left behind unprecedented destruction in the streets, infrastructure, homes, and shops in Tulkarm camp. The Israeli army also blew up several homes in the camp.

At approximately 3:30 pm on the same day, Wednesday, January 17, 2024, the large Israeli invasion extended to the city's Nour Shams camp, which also witnessed violent clashes and significant destruction in the streets and infrastructure as a result of several hours of demolition from bulldozers. The invasion extended to the Nour Shams camp again at approximately 6:00 am on Thursday, January 18, 2024, which led to violent clashes in the camp, during which the Tulkarm Brigade detonated multiple explosive devices. Israeli bulldozers bulldozed streets and facilities in the camp again, and the Israeli army blew up houses in the camp, simultaneously with the violent armed clashes, detonation of explosive devices, and total siege of the Tulkarm camp.

After 45 hours since the start of the invasion, Israel announced the end of this military operation, saying that its forces "searched about 1,000 buildings and found more than 400 explosive devices, some of which were buried under roads. Five laboratories for producing the charges and four monitoring centers were destroyed, and 37 wanted persons were arrested, including senior officials".

The UN spokesman commented on this invasion, saying that it resulted in "making more than 20 homes uninhabitable in the Nur Shams and Tulkarm refugee camps, in addition to civilian casualties."

==== January 29–30, 2024 incursion ====
At approximately 9:50 pm on Monday, January 29, 2024, Israel invaded the city of Tulkarm and the city's two camps with dozens of military vehicles and bulldozers. The invasion continued until approximately 5:40 am on Tuesday, January 30, 2024. This invasion left behind extensive destruction to the streets and infrastructure, and caused a widespread interruption of the water network in the city and its two camps for days.

Israeli military bulldozers (two crawler bulldozers and two wheeled bulldozers) razed streets in the city and the camps. They razed a section of Al-Sikka Street in the city, in addition to razing streets inside Nour Shams camp and Tulkarm camp. The bulldozers also destroyed the entrances to the Al-Salam Mosque and the Muadh bin Jabal Mosque in Tulkarm camp.

=== February 2024 ===
A young man was shot in the chest during an Israeli raid on Kafr Jammal on 3 February. Two men were killed in Nur Shams on 7 February. The head of Nur Sham's popular committee stated that since 7 October, Israeli forces had raided 17 times, killed 23 young men, destroyed 35 homes, displaced 800 residents, and destroyed roads, sewage, water, and electricity networks. Two people were killed on 18 February. In response, the Palestinian Foreign Ministry stated, "Carte blanche has been given to Israeli soldiers from the political echelon, enabling them to shoot Palestinians on a whim and without any threat posed."

==== 6–7 February 2024 incursion ====
Israel invaded the city of Tulkarm at approximately 11:40 Palestine time on Tuesday evening, February 6, 2024, with the invasion focusing on the city's Nour Shams camp. The invasion continued until approximately 5:40 a.m. on Wednesday, February 7, 2024. Dozens of Israeli military vehicles, including tracked and wheeled military bulldozers, participated in the invasion, leaving massive destruction in the streets of Nour Shams camp. At approximately 1:30 p.m. on the same day, Israel returned and invaded the city of Tulkarm, specifically Nour Shams camp, with special forces followed by reinforcements and bulldozers, where it carried out an assassination operation against three Palestinians after besieging them in a building in Nour Shams camp. The operation continued until 7:40 p.m. on the same day.

The three Palestinian dead were Moatasem Ali Dama (a commander in the Tulkarm Brigade), his cousin Islam Ibrahim Ali Dama, and Ziad Ali Hashem Dama. They were assassinated after being surrounded by the Israeli army in a house at the Nour Shams camp. The Israeli army bombed the house with missiles and destroyed it with bulldozers. The Palestinian Ministry of Health later announced their deaths.

The Palestinian Red Crescent reported that the Israeli army had prevented ambulances from entering the Nour Shams camp to evacuate the dead and wounded during this large-scale military operation.

==== February 18, 2024 incursion and special military operation ====
Israeli special forces carried out a raid and special military operation at the Tulkarm camp in Tulkarm city on Sunday morning, February 18, 2024, which resulted in the killing of two Palestinians and the wounding of others by gunfire. Israeli forces assassinated the leader of the Tulkarm Brigade, Muhammad Ahmad Fayez Al-Awfi, and his companion after besieging them in a house, while an Israeli soldier was seriously injured.

At approximately 10:00 PSST on Sunday morning, February 18, Israeli special forces stormed Tulkarm camp in Tulkarm city in two civilian vehicles and surrounded the house, followed by large Israeli military reinforcements and three Israeli military bulldozers. The first bulldozer was wheeled, the second was tracked, and the third was a truck-mounted excavator. The invasion continued until approximately 1:45 pm, when the Israeli army forces withdrew while taking the body of Al-Awfi with them. The Palestinian Red Crescent Society said that the Israeli army obstructed the work of medical crews and prevented ambulances from reaching the wounded in the camp.

The Israeli army announced in an official statement that an Israeli soldier was seriously injured during clashes with Palestinian gunmen in the Tulkarm camp during this military operation. An Israeli military helicopter had landed in the vicinity of Tulkarm city to evacuate Israeli army casualties.

=== March 2024 ===
Two men were killed by Israeli forces during a raid on 12 March. Israel launched a raid on 21 March, with witnesses stating it was the "most brutally violent night they've ever had in terms of the destruction they've seen around them." The Palestine Red Crescent Society stated four people were killed during an Israeli raid on Nur Shams.

==== March 3–4, 2024 incursion ====
On the evening of March 3, 2024, Israel invaded the city of Tulkarm, focusing specifically on the city's Nour Shams camp. The invasion continued until the dawn of March 4, 2024. Several Israeli military vehicles and military bulldozers participated in the invasion, leaving behind massive destruction, especially in a part of the city's "Nablus Street", which the Israeli army had dug several meters underground under.

The invasion led to violent clashes between the Tulkarm Brigade and the Israeli army, during which the Tulkarm Brigade detonated "highly explosive" devices that damaged two Israeli "Tiger" armored personnel carriers and also damaged an Israeli wheeled military bulldozer, which required the Israeli army to withdraw it from Tulkarm by towing it with a crawler military bulldozer.

==== March 9, 2024 incursion ====
Israel invaded the city of Tulkarm, and in particular the city's Nour Shams camp, at approximately 12:30 a.m. on March 9, 2024, with dozens of Israeli military vehicles and tracked and wheeled military bulldozers. The invasion continued until approximately 8:15 a.m. on the same day, leading to massive destruction of the infrastructure and streets of Tulkarm.

During the invasion, Israeli military bulldozers completely razed the city's "Saif Roundabout" and "Bir al-Hamdallah Roundabout" streets, and violent clashes broke out between the Tulkarm Brigade and the Israeli army. The Tulkarm Brigade also detonated "highly explosive" explosive devices, one of which directly hit an Israeli military bulldozer, forcing the Israeli army to withdraw it from Tulkarm by towing it with another military bulldozer.

==== March 11, 2024 incursion ====
Only a few hours passed since the last invasion before the Israeli army returned at approximately 12:15 AM on Monday, March 11, 2024, the first day of Ramadan in the Palestinian territories. The invasion continued until approximately 6:35 AM on the same day. This invasion led to massive destruction of the streets and infrastructure in the city of Tulkarm and the city's two camps.

The invasion began with Israeli military bulldozers bulldozing the "Sariat Al-Alam" roundabout in Tulkarm before besieging the city's Nour Shams camp, which witnessed violent clashes between the Tulkarm Brigade and the Israeli army, involving the Tulkarm Brigade detonating highly explosive devices. The Israeli army also bulldozed several streets in the Nour Shams camp in addition to bulldozing the "Saif Roundabout" in the city for the second time in less than two days, while firing flares into the sky at the site.

At dawn, Israeli army forces moved to the Tulkarm camp in the city and began fierce clashes against the Tulkarm Brigade, coinciding with Israeli military bulldozers once again completely destroying the main streets and infrastructure in the Tulkarm camp.

==== March 20–21, 2024 incursion ====
At approximately 10:20 pm PSST on Wednesday, March 20, 2024, Israel invaded the city of Tulkarm and the city's Nour Shams camp with more than fifty military vehicles accompanied by heavy military bulldozers. The invasion continued until approximately 8:45 am on Thursday, March 21, 2024, and resulted in the killing of four Palestinians and the injury of several others, in addition to the heavy destruction of the city's streets.

A few hours before the invasion, Israel had bulldozed the street surrounding the Al-Murabitun Mosque in the city twice on Wednesday, March 20, 2024. Following this, the invasion began with the Israeli army besieging the city center and the Nour Shams camp in the city, where Israeli army vehicles were deployed on Paris Street, the area around Thabet Thabet Square, and the area around Tulkarm Governmental Hospital in the city center.

At the beginning of the invasion, the Israeli army bombed a target in the Nour Shams camp with a drone, killing two Palestinians immediately and wounding others. The Israeli army then killed two more Palestinians during violent armed clashes in the camp.

The Israeli army declared a curfew in the Nour Shams camp, deployed snipers in the area, turned several houses into military barracks, and demolished the home of a wanted Palestinian.

This invasion led to the largest recorded amount of destruction to the streets of Tulkarm city, as Israeli military bulldozers razed streets, causing immense damage. Streets that were destroyed included the street surrounding the Al-Murabitun Mosque, the section of Al-Sikka Street extending from the Bir Al-Hamdallah Roundabout to the Saif Roundabout, the street surrounding the Saif Roundabout, and the section of Nablus Street extending from Saif Roundabout to the end of Nour Shams Camp.

=== April 2024 ===
Medical sources in Nur Shams stated a man had been shot in the chin and neck by an Israeli sniper while filming a military raid on the camp. Destruction was reported following an Israeli raid in late-April, with the Palestinian Red Crescent reporting 14 deaths.

==== April 8, 2024 incursion ====
At approximately 1:00 AM PSST on Monday morning, April 8, 2024 (the dawn of day 29 of Ramadan), Israel invaded the city of Tulkarm and the Tulkarm camp with dozens of military vehicles and bulldozers. The invasion continued until approximately 5:30 AM on the same day, and left behind destruction to infrastructure and streets.

The Israeli army completely surrounded the Tulkarm camp in the city, leading to violent clashes breaking out which included several explosions. Israeli tracked and wheeled bulldozers also razed a section of the street in front of the Al-Murabitun Mosque in the city, a section of the street surrounding the Al-Alam Roundabout, and a section at the beginning of Al-Balawneh Street around the Tulkarm camp. Israeli army vehicles were deployed in the city center, specifically in the Gold Market area and Gamal Abdel Nasser Square.

==== April 18–20, 2024 incursion ====
On the evening of April 18, 2024, Israeli army forces invaded the city of Tulkarm and the Nour Shams camp from the western axis of the city, accompanied by military bulldozers. Israeli forces surrounded the Nour Shams camp, passing through the square of Al-Alimi court, Al-Quds Open University Street, Nablus Street, Iktaba roundabout, and the employees' housing. The Israeli army imposed a tight siege on the Nour Shams camp, deployed its vehicles on all the axes of the camp leading to it, and closed the main street adjacent to its entrances. At the same time, reconnaissance aircraft flew over the camp at a low altitude.

During the second day of the invasion on April 19, 2024, three Israeli soldiers were injured during an exchange of fire with Palestinian resistance fighters in the camp, and the Israeli army continued to raid a number of homes while carrying out arrest operations.

During the third day of the invasion on April 20, 2024, the Israeli army spokesman announced that nine Israeli soldiers were wounded with varying degrees of injury by Palestinian gunfire in the Nour Shams camp.

At approximately 11:30 p.m. on the third day of the invasion, the Israeli army withdrew from Tulkarm, marking the end of the longest, largest, and most violent invasion into the city up to that point since the Second Intifada. Palestinian ambulances were able to enter the camp after the Israeli army vehicles withdrew, retrieving the bodies of fourteen dead Palestinians. The Palestinian Ministry of Health announced that their bodies arrived at the Thabet Thabet Governmental Hospital.

On April 19, the Palestinian presidency condemned what it described as "the new crime committed by the Israeli occupation forces in the city of Tulkarm, including the Nour Shams and Tulkarm camps". On April 20, 2024, the head of the Palestinian National Council, Rawhi Fattouh, condemned what he described as "the heinous crime and massacre".

The Organization of Islamic Cooperation said it "strongly condemns the military aggression" on the Nour Shams camp in Tulkarm in a statement on April 20, and renewed its "call on the international community to assume its responsibilities towards obliging the occupation forces to stop their military aggression and ongoing violations throughout the occupied Palestinian territories and to provide protection to the Palestinian people".

=== May 2024 ===
Three young men in their twenties were reportedly killed in an overnight raid on 16 May. In July 2024, Palestinian officials stated five people were killed by Israeli troops during a raid.

==== May 6, 2024 incursion ====
At approximately 12:20 AM Palestine Summer Time (PSDT) on Monday, May 6, 2024, the Israeli army invaded the city of Tulkarm and the city's two camps with dozens of military vehicles accompanied by five wheeled and tracked military bulldozers. The invasion continued until approximately 11:00 p.m. on the same day. This invasion resulted in the killing of a Palestinian by Israeli army gunfire and the injury of others, in addition to the destruction of infrastructure and streets.

The invasion of Tulkarm city began with the Israeli army besieging the Nour Shams camp and bulldozing streets in the camp before completely besieging Tulkarm camp, blowing up houses in it and bulldozing entire streets inside of it. The Israeli army also bulldozed streets in the city, including the street in front of the entrance to the Tulkarm District headquarters. The Israeli army besieged the downtown area that includes Thabet Thabet Hospital, which the Israeli army also besieged.

The Israeli army blew up a medical center belonging to the Palestinian Red Crescent Society inside the Tulkarm camp.

==== May 16, 2024 storming operation ====
At approximately 12:00 a.m. on Thursday, May 16, 2024, PSDT, Israel stormed the center of Tulkarm city, accompanied by a military bulldozer. The Israeli army was stationed in the areas surrounding Gamal Abdel Nasser Square, Tulkarm Orthodox Church, the International Red Cross headquarters, the entrance to Thabet Thabet Governmental Hospital, Thabet Thabet Square, Shuweika Roundabout, and Bank Street. The Israeli army deployed snipers on the roofs of tall buildings in the center of the city, which led to the killing of three Palestinians by gunfire in the city center and the injury of at least five others. The raid continued until approximately 3:40 a.m., during which the Israeli army raided a number of exchange offices in the city and completely blew up one of these offices. A general strike spread throughout Tulkarm Governorate on Thursday, May 16, 2024, in response to a call to action from the Palestinian national and Islamic forces.

=== July 2024 ===
==== July 1, 2024 incursion ====
At 3:45 PSDT on Monday morning, July 1, 2024, Israel invaded the city of Tulkarm, Nour Shams camp, and the entrance to Tulkarm camp in the city with dozens of military vehicles accompanied by four bulldozers, two of which were tracked. The invasion continued until 1:00 pm on the same day. The invasion left massive destruction to the infrastructure, streets, traffic light network, main water lines, and caused the postponement of the Palestinian high school exam. The invasion also led to the killing of two Palestinians (a child and a woman) and the injury of others. Israel announced the killing of one of its soldiers and the injury of others during the invasion, in addition to the bombing and significant destruction of an Israeli " Tiger " vehicle. This invasion came only hours after an Israeli air strike on a house in the Nour Shams camp on Sunday afternoon, June 30, 2024, which led to the killing of "Saeed Jaber", one of the leaders of the Tulkarm Brigade.

The invasion began with the destruction by Israeli bulldozers of the Al-Younis Roundabout area in Tulkarm, followed by the destruction of Al-Sikka Street and Iktaba Roundabout in the city. After that, the Israeli forces and their bulldozers moved to Nablus Street in the city, which they largely destroyed. The Israeli army once again razed what remained of the "Saif Roundabout" area after completely destroying it twice in March 2024.

The Israeli forces then penetrated deeper into the Nour Shams camp, causing violent clashes to erupt with the Tulkarm Brigade detonated explosive devices, one of which hit an Israeli armored vehicle, destroying it "significantly" and injuring those inside. This prompted the Israeli army to bring in a heavy military logistical vehicle to tow the damaged vehicle. The Israeli army also transferred its wounded soldiers from Tulkarm to the Israeli Sna'oz camp adjacent to the city, followed by the landing of an Israeli military helicopter in the camp, transporting the wounded soldiers. On the same day, Israel announced the death of one of its soldiers, 22-year-old Major Yehuda Gato, the driver of the vehicle, and the serious injury of another as a result of the explosion, all of whom belonged to the Duvdevan unit as part of the Oz Brigade.

At noon, the intensity of armed clashes between Tulkarm Brigade members and the Israeli army escalated at the entrance to Tulkarm camp as Israeli vehicles and bulldozers surrounded the entrance to the camp, which led to the killing of two Palestinians (a child and a woman) in Tulkarm camp by Israeli army bullets. Several Palestinians were also injured in the city's neighborhoods and camps, as announced by the director of Tulkarm Governmental Hospital and the Palestinian Ministry of Health. In addition, Israeli bulldozers destroyed the traffic light network in the Zenobia Junction area in the center of the city at noon.

The Palestinian Ministry of Education had announced at eight o'clock a.m. the postponement of the unified Palestinian high school exam (English language exam) in the morning for all schools in Tulkarm Governorate due to the ongoing Israeli invasion of Tulkarm, which was planned to be administered that morning.

Hours prior to this, Israel had bombed a house in the city's Nour Shams camp on Sunday afternoon, June 30, 2024, with three missiles from an aircraft. The missiles killed Saeed Jaber, the leader of the Tulkarm Brigade, and wounded five other Palestinians who were taken to the Tulkarm Governmental Hospital, with two in critical condition.

A few hours after the Israeli withdrawal, the Israeli army bombed the Nour Shams camp with a drone on the evening of Tuesday, July 2, 2024, instantly killing four Palestinians.

==== July 9, 2024 incursion ====
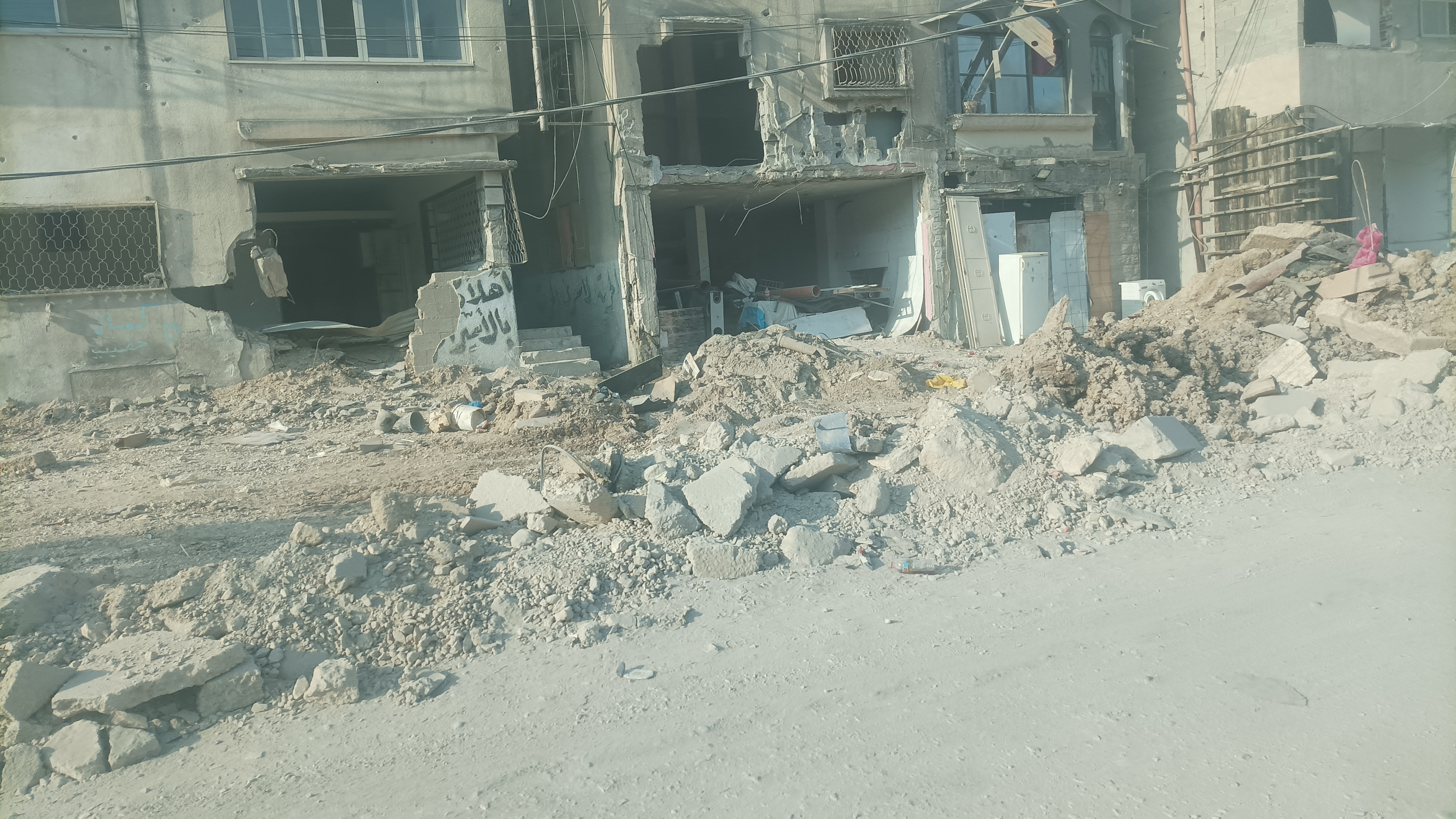
Destruction caused by the IDF in Nablus Street and Nour Shams Camp, Tulkarm, in July 2024

On Tuesday, July 9, 2024, Israel invaded the city of Tulkarm and the city's Nour Shams camp with dozens of military vehicles accompanied by seven military bulldozers. The invasion continued until around afternoon on the same day. The invasion left immense destruction in the streets and infrastructure. The destruction was described as the largest in the history of the West Bank since Israel's occupation of the territory in 1967.

The invasion began with the Israeli army completely besieging both the government hospital and the Israa Specialized Hospital in the city center. The army deployed its vehicles in the commercial market area in the city center, checked the identities of journalists while they were covering the events, and deployed its snipers in several buildings. The army also besieged the Tulkarm camp in the city, and caused significant disruption to the city's communications and internet networks.

Four military bulldozers worked collectively to completely destroy the Younis Roundabout square in the middle of the city, which led to the disappearance of its features and the destruction of its infrastructure. The bulldozers, including the excavator, swept away Nablus Street in the area adjacent to the Nour Shams camp, turning it into a trench more than three meters deep and completely destroying it in addition to shops, homes, electricity, communications, internet, sewage, and water lines. The bulldozers also destroyed the Saif Roundabout square area and the surrounding shops, destroying it completely for the fourth time since March 2024. At the same time, the bulldozers penetrated deep into the Nour Shams camp and destroyed several homes and streets in it.

Following the Israeli withdrawal, the Tulkarm Municipality announced that "Nour Shams Camp in Tulkarm City is officially considered a disaster area". The National Action Movement announced that the city of Tulkarm and its two camps were now a disaster area in need of urgent reconstruction and consular visits.

The Palestinian government condemned what it described as Israeli aggression on Tulkarm and the unprecedented destruction of the Nour Shams camp, the infrastructure, and the main electricity and water lines in the city. The National Union of Civil Society Organizations in Tulkarm Governorate also called on the Palestinian government to urgently invite consuls and international institutions to see the extent of the destruction brought on the city.

The Minister of Local Government, Sami Hijjawi, the Minister of Public Works, Ahed Bseiso, and the Director General of Civil Defense, Al-Abed Ibrahim Khalil, inspected the extent of the destruction in Nour Shams camp. Palestinian governmental and civil institutions announced that Israel had completely or partially destroyed dozens of Palestinian homes in the Nour Shams camp.

==== July 22–23, 2024 incursion ====
Israel invaded the city of Tulkarm and the Tulkarm refugee camp in the city at approximately 10:45 p.m. on July 22, 2024, with dozens of Israeli military vehicles and seven military bulldozers. The invasion continued until approximately 1:30 p.m. on July 23, and resulted in massive destruction, the "widest and most severe" to the infrastructure and streets in the center of the city and the Tulkarm camp. The devastation also led to the interruption of electricity, communications, the Internet, and water for long hours in many of the city's neighborhoods, including Tulkarm camp. Five Palestinians were killed and many others were seriously injured.

In Tulkarm camp, the invasion of the camp began with the Israeli army entering the city from its western and southern axes. Israeli bulldozers destroyed the infrastructure and streets in the camp, and an Israeli drone bombed the camp, killing five Palestinians that including two commanders in the Tulkarm Brigade. The Israeli army spokesman said in a brief statement that "an air force plane attacked gunmen during the military operation" and the Tulkarm Brigade announced that it had detonated several explosive devices, one of which hit an Israeli bulldozer and damaged it, which prompted the Israeli army to drag it out of Tulkarm using another bulldozer.

In the city center, Israeli bulldozers razed part of Government Hospital Street in addition to Muqata'a Street and two Israeli tracked bulldozers destroyed the vegetable market in the city center and the vicinity of Gamal Abdel Nasser Square.

In the western neighborhoods of the city, two Israeli bulldozers destroyed the electricity, communications, and internet networks, poles, and cables on Yaffa Street, Al-Fadhiliyah Street, Khadouri Roundabout, and Hilmi Hanoun School Street, and also demolished part of the wall of Hilmi Hanoun School, while crushing nearby parked vehicles and uprooting trees.

In the eastern neighborhoods of the city, Israeli bulldozers destroyed Muqata'a Street, destroyed the Martyrs' Monument, demolished part of the wall of the Local Government and Public Works Directorates, bulldozed the Abu Safiya Junction Street along with other streets, and destroyed several parked vehicles.

The Israeli army described the invasion as a military operation in a series of counter-terrorism operations in Tulkarm, while Palestinian Prime Minister Muhammad Mustafa condemned what he called a "brutal attack" on Tulkarm during the weekly government session on the morning of July 23, 2024.

=== August 2024 ===
==== August 3, 2024 incursion ====
At approximately 4:50 am on Saturday, August 3, 2024, the Israeli army entered accompanied by bulldozers and completely destroyed the "Al-Alimi Roundabout" (the Palestinian flagpole square) in the city and its surroundings, leading to its comprehensive destruction. The Israeli army then withdrew from the city at approximately 5:50 a.m., killing five Palestinians north of the governorate in an airstrike. The Israeli army then returned at 10:00 a.m and invaded the city in a more widespread area, including the Tulkarm camp. The invasion continued until 2:00 p.m., during which the Israeli army killed four more Palestinians in a new airstrike east of the city and bringing the Palestinian death toll to nine, in addition to massive destruction.

This invasion led to great destruction in the western and eastern neighborhoods of the city and the Tulkarm camp in the center of the city. In the eastern neighborhoods, Israeli bulldozers destroyed several walls and completely smashed many vehicles. In the western neighborhoods, forces completely razed the Al-Alimi Roundabout and its surroundings. In the Tulkarm camp, bulldozers again razed the streets of the camp, leaving great destruction amidst violent clashes.

==== August 28, 2024 incursion ====
Israel launched a large-scale military operation into both Tulkarm and Jenin involving hundreds of IDF soldiers.

=== January 2025 ===
On 27 January 2025, Israel formally expanded its "Iron Wall" military operation into Tulkarm.

== Other raids and incursions ==
=== Ramallah ===
On 12 October 2023, a group of Israeli soldiers and settlers stripped a group of men naked in Ramallah, urinating on them, burning them with cigarettes, and sexually assaulted one man. Five people were wounded during a raid in Ramallah. On 5 January, a teenage boy was shot and killed in Bani Zeid al-Gharbia. A local doctor was blindfolded and arrested during a Ramallah raid on 7 January. A doctor and nurse were arrested in Ramallah on 8 January. Israeli forces reportedly released poisonous gas during a raid in Beit Rima on 28 January.

On 7 February 2024, Israeli forces broke into the house of an American woman in Silwad, pulled her out of bed and arrested her due to her social media posts. A teenager was reportedly shot in the head and killed by Israeli forces on 10 February. Six children were reportedly arrested in Aboud on 20 February. Two ten-year-olds were arrested on 22 February. The body of a 13-year-old boy from Jalazone was found dead near the separation wall, close to Beit El, an illegal Israeli settlement. A teenage boy was shot dead by Israeli forces on 2 March in Kafr Ni'ma. A 13-year-old boy was killed by Israeli forces on 3 March, after he was reportedly left bleeding out for hours. A 16-year-old protester was shot and killed on 4 March. In June 2024, Israeli forces raided Kafr Nima, killing four people and wounding four. A 12-year-old boy died after being shot by Israeli forces in June 2024.

==== Killing of Tawfiq Ajaq ====
On 19 January 2024, Israeli forces killed an American teenager in Al-Mazra'a ash-Sharqiya. (Note: The boy was from New Orleans.) His father stated, "They are killer machines. They are using our tax dollars in the US to support the weapons to kill our own children." The U.S. Office for Palestinian Affairs called for an investigation into the boy's death. The U.S. State Department stated, "We are working to understand the circumstances of the incident [and] have asked the Government of Israel for further information." The National Security Council spokesman stated the White House was "seriously concerned about these reports". The State Department called for an "urgent investigation" on 22 January. On 25 January, U.S. Congressmember Rashida Tlaib called for an investigation into Ajaq's death, stating, "Tawfiq deserved to grow old." A witness of the killing stated the shooting was unprovoked.

A month later on 10 February, Israeli forces killed another American citizen in Biddu. The victim was 17-year-old Mohammad Khdour, who was shot in the head while out driving.

=== Hebron ===
An investigation was launched on 6 December 2023 after Israeli soldiers shot and wounded a mentally disabled man in Hebron. A 28-year-old pharmaceutical representative was shot dead by the IDF in Beit Einun after turning on a road he didn't know was closed. On 21 December 2023, Israeli forces raided multiple areas across the Palestinian territories including Halhul and Surif. On 27 December, the Palestinian Red Crescent reported three people were wounded during an IDF raid in Hebron. People in Hebron were injured on 30 December 2023 with rubber bullets and tear gas. On 30 December 2023, the governor of the Hebron Governorate stated the city of Hebron had been sealed off by the IDF since 7 October. On 29 December 2023, Israeli forces assaulted and fired shots at Palestinian shepherds in the Masafer Yatta region.

Raids were reported in Al-Arroub on 5 January 2024. On 13 January 2024, Israeli forces shot and killed three teenage boys near Adora, Har Hevron. Later, troops raided the boys' family house in Hebron, using tear gas, sound bombs, and rubber bullets, while their family was mourning the killings. On 15 January 2024, a young man and young woman were killed near Hebron after an Israeli raid. On 19 January 2024, the home of Imad Abu Shamsieh, a human rights activist, was raided, and he was told to stop "filming and documenting". On 29 January 2024, the acting mayor of Hebron said Israeli forces had killed two young men and wounded three in Dura. A boy killed on his way home from school on 15 February 2024 was the 100th child in the West Bank to be killed by Israel since 7 October. Three young brothers were shot by Israeli forces near Hebron on 29 February while picking plants, killing one.

On 25 March 2024, authenticated footage showed Israeli soldiers removing a young boy's shirt and slapping him in the face. A 14-year-old boy was reportedly shot and killed in May 2024. In August 2024, Doctors Without Borders described increased Israeli restrictions and violence against Palestinians was impacting Hebron residents physical and mental health. During a raid on the Al-Fawar refugee camp, Israeli soldiers abused civilians and arrested more than 30 people.

=== Tubas, Bethlehem, and Qalqilya ===
On 15 December 2023, Israel launched an investigation after B'tselem released video of IDF soldiers shooting two unarmed men at point-blank range in Far'a. Seven were wounded in a raid near Tubas. On 27 February, the acting governor of Tubas stated that an Israeli raid had destroyed roads, generators, while "three young men were killed in cold blood while living their normal lives at their homes". In June 2024, a raid on Far'a reportedly lasted more than 12 hours, killing a 15-year-old boy. In September 2024, an Israeli sniper killed Sufyan Jaber Abed Jawwad, the first UN employee to be killed in the West Bank in more than a decade.

Raids were also reported in Bethlehem on Christmas Day. On 6 January, Israeli forces reportedly conducted a "crackdown" on resistance and dissent, with troops reportedly beating three men in Bethlehem. A health clinic near Bethlehem was raided on 10 January. Raids were reported near Bethlehem on 18 January, with four young men reportedly beaten by soldiers. On 11 February 2024, the Palestinian Ministry of Health reported that a 35-year-old man had been killed by Israeli forces with 20 bullets found in his body.

On 29 December 2023, a 17-year-old boy in Qalqilya was shot in the chest and then arrested while ambulances sought to aid him. On 2 January 2024, paramedics in Qalqilya were shot when they tried to rescue an injured man. A 20-year-old was killed when Israeli forces shot him in the head, shoulders, and chest. A fifteen-year-old boy was killed on 21 February. On 9 March, the mayor of Azzun stated that Israeli forces had killed 8 young men and arrested more than 100 since 7 October. A 15-year-old boy was reportedly shot and killed by Israeli forces in August 2024.

=== Nablus ===
Explosions and armed fighting were reported in Balata Camp on 24 December. Thirty-five people were arrested in raids across the West Bank on 25 December. 200 homes in Burqa were raided on Christmas Day. Officials in Sebastia reported Israeli settlers were attacking and destroying archeological sites. At least 14 people were injured during a raid in Nablus on 9 January. On 10 January, five were wounded in Nablus. The head of the Balata Camp service committee stated Israeli soldiers had killed five men in the camp on 17 January 2024, then stated, "Israeli forces kidnapped the bodies of four of the men as well as some body parts of Yazan al-Najmi". On 4 February, Israeli forces released a military dog on a 4-year-old boy, who was repeatedly bit and bled profusely for three minutes before being hospitalized. On 6 February, a young man in Beit Furik was shot and killed after Israeli forces prevented ambulances from reaching him.

On 13 February, settlers attacked shepherds, pelting them with stones, setting a vehicle on fire, and attempting to steal their flock. On 18 February, the governor of Nablus stated 48 people had been killed by Israelis since 7 October, and that the military was erecting gates and checkpoints, effectively turning it into a "big prison". The village council chair of Duma stated their town had been sealed off by the IDF for 90 days and required international intervention. A 17-year-old boy was shot in the back and killed during a military raid on 29 February. An 11-year-old was killed after being shot in the head by Israeli live ammunition in Burin on 4 March. After Israeli settlers attacked a home, Israeli forces arrived to protect the settlers, shooting live bullets and tear gas canisters at the Palestinian homeowners. In August 2024, a Palestinian Red Crescent paramedic died a week after sustaining injuries during an Israeli raid.

In November 2024, an Israeli soldier on a military jeep shot and killed an 11-year-old boy.

=== Across West Bank ===
On 31 October, Israeli forces heightened their operations in other parts of the West Bank, resulting in the deaths of five Palestinians in Qabatiya, Tammun, and Nablus. This brought the total number of casualties in the West Bank since 7 October to 90 people, according to the Palestinian Ministry of Health.

The Palestinian Red Crescent reported Israeli forces had fired live ammunition on youth protesters in Halhul, injuring two, with additional raids in Tubas, Qalqilya, Deir Abu Da'if, Jalbun, and Jalqamus. On 23 December, raids were reported across the West Bank, including in Dheisheh, Hebron, Yatta, Beita, Qaryut, Jericho, Ein as-Sultan, and Aqabat Jaber. The same day, Israeli soldiers shot a man with special needs carrying a bag of lollipops reportedly for no apparent reason. On 25 December, Israeli forces destroyed an agricultural facility in Salfit and ordered the residents of Yatta to cease construction of a new school. On 28 December, the Palestine Monetary Authority reported Israeli forces raided the headquarters of six exchange companies and seized vast sums of money. Approximately $2.5 million were seized after soldiers blew up the bank vaults. Raids were reported across the West Bank on 9 January.

Five Palestinians were killed throughout the West Bank on 14 January. Raids were reported across the West Bank on 18 January. Raids were reported across the West Bank on 21 January, placing economic pressure on residents and disrupting peoples' livelihoods. Raids were reported across the West Bank on 25 January. Raids on 29 January killed five boys and young men in just 24 hours. A Jericho raid by Israeli forces on 21 March killed a young Palestinian man.

On 15 March 2026, Israeli soldiers killed 4 members of a Palestinian family, including two children aged 5 and 7, in Tammun. Each of the deceased were shot in the head. Two surviving children stated that Israeli soldiers had shouted "We killed dogs" after shooting their family members.

=== East Jerusalem ===
On 22 December, two Palestinians in East Jerusalem were wounded after Israeli forces fired sound bombs and tear gas. On 29 December, Israeli forces fired skunk water, tear gas, and rubber bullets at worshippers in Wadi al-Joz. The same day, one individual was reported injured following an Israeli raid in Kafr 'Aqab. A raid was reported in Silwan, with families reporting Israeli troops ransacking homes after accusing them of shooting fireworks at settlers 2 km away. A four-year-old girl was killed by Israeli soldiers at a checkpoint on 7 January. A man in az-Za'ayyem was reportedly forced to demolish his own home. A fourteen-year-old boy was shot and killed on 5 February. A 15-year-old boy was killed on 12 February. A 13-year-old boy was arrested on 14 February.

An American teenager was shot in the head and killed by Israeli police in Biddu. In a statement, the U.S. State Department said, "We urgently call for a quick, thorough, and transparent investigation, including full accountability". On 21 February, Fakhri Abu Diab, a researcher, stated that Israeli policy had implemented an "iron fist" on Jerusalem Palestinians, thus subjecting them to collective punishment.

In May 2024, the UNRWA office was closed after Israelis set fire to the building, causing "extensive damage". Philippe Lazzarini, head of UNRWA, stated UN staff in prior months had been harassed, intimidated, and threatened with guns by Israelis. On 13 May, HaMoked stated that Israelis had again attacked UNRWA headquarters, setting the perimeter on fire.

==== Killing of Rami Hamdan al-Halhuli ====
A 13-year-old boy was shot in the chest by Israeli forces and died in East Jerusalem on 12 March. Israeli forces said the boy had shot fireworks at them; however, video of the incident showed he had aimed the fireworks into the air. Clashes between protesters and Israeli forces erupted the following day. Following the child's death, Itamar Ben-Gvir stated that he saluted the troops who had killed the "terrorist". Israel held onto the child's body, reportedly to pressure the family to reduce the large number of people mourning the boy's death in their home. Israeli forces stated they would release the body but stated the child would need to be buried on the opposite side of the Israeli West Bank barrier from his family.

The boy's family described the child, stating, "He was good at school, he was smart, he helped our neighbours." A preliminary investigation suggested the boy was shot and killed before his firework had launched. The boy's funeral was held on 18 March.

=== Jordan Valley ===
Shepherds in the Jordan Valley reported arbitrary arrests and settler violence following 7 October. Israeli forces stormed the Ein as-Sultan camp on 1 February 2024.

== Large-scale Israeli operations ==
=== Operation Summer Camps ===
On 28 August 2024, Israel launched its largest military operation inside the West Bank since Operation Defensive Shield in 2002, calling it "Operation Summer Camps", and deployed hundreds of IDF troops together with bulldozers and air support.

The stated aim of the operation was to degrade West Bank militant forces and prevent attacks on Israeli targets. Israeli foreign minister Israel Katz labelled the operation a "full-fledged war" and accused Iran of trying to establish an "eastern terrorist front" against Israel in the West Bank by funding and arming militants in the region.

As part of the military operation, Israeli forces battled Palestinian militants in and around cities across the West Bank, including Tulkarm and Jenin. Notably, the IDF managed to kill Abu Shujaa and Wassem Hazem, the heads of the Tulkarm Brigade and Hamas' Jenin branch, respectively.

On 3 October 2024, Israel launched its first airstrike on the Tulkarm refugee camp since Operation Defensive Shield, killing 20 people including Zahi Yaser Abd al-Razeq Oufi and Ayyth Radwan, the respective heads of the local Hamas and Palestinian Islamic Jihad branches.

Ultimately, the operation did not deal a substantial blow to Palestinian militancy.

=== Iron Wall ===
On 21 January 2025, Israel began another large-scale military operation in the West Bank, just days after the implementation of the January 2025 Gaza war ceasefire. Israel's operation, which it calls "Iron Wall", began in Jenin, but has spread to Tulkarm and other Palestinian cities and towns. It marks a strategically distinct and more aggressive approach against West Bank militancy compared to previous Israeli raids, and also marks the first time that the Palestinian Authority directly participates in an Israeli military operation.

Iron Wall has been reportedly yielding operational success. Israeli forces have seized control of the Jenin refugee camp, Nur Shams, and the refugee camp in Tulkarm, clearing them from militants. In August 2025, Katz stated the IDF would remain deployed to refugee camps in the northern West Bank at least until the end of the year.

=== Operation Five Stones ===
On 26 November 2025, Israel launched "Operation Five Stones", which targeted Palestinian militants in an area of Tubas Governorate dubbed the "Pentagon of Villages": Tubas, Tammun, the al-Fara'a camp, Aqaba, and Tayasir. The military operation imposed a siege on Tubas Governorate. While some sources described the operation as an extension of Iron Wall, the IDF said it was not and referred to it as a new and distinct operation.

After days of raids, Israeli forces pulled out of Tubas Governorate on 29 November, marking the operation's conclusion.

== Reprisal attacks by militants ==
=== 2023 ===
On 20 November, the Salfit Battalion, an unaffiliated minor Palestinian militia, attacked two settler vehicles near Az-Zawiya.

On 21 December, militants attacked the Beitar Illit settlement near Bethlehem with explosives.

=== 2024 ===
On 12 January, the IDF killed three militants who attempted to infiltrate an Israeli settlement near Hebron and wounded a soldier. On 15 January, two militants who entered Israel covertly from Hebron carried out vehicle-ramming attacks in Ra'anana, killing one person and injuring 18 others.

On 16 February, the al-Quds Brigades fired at Israeli forces stationed at the Dotan checkpoint, south of the Mevo Dotan settlement in the West Bank. On 29 February, three militants, including a Palestinian Authority policeman, opened fire at a gas station near the West Bank settlement of Eli, killing two Israelis.

On 16 March, a militant reportedly affiliated with Hamas opened fire on a settlement near Hebron and was killed by the IDF.

On 13 April, the Al-Aqsa Martyrs' Brigades attacked an IDF checkpoint, an Israeli settlement near Tulkarm, and an Israeli town on the West Bank border.

On 19 June, the Al-Quds Brigades targeted an outpost on the site of the former Homesh settlement with explosives. On 22 June, the Tulkarm Brigade killed an Israeli civilian in Qalqilya.

On 16 July, at the Ramin Junction near Nablus, militants opened fire on an Israeli vehicle that had previously injured several Palestinian civilians. Three settlers inside were wounded. On 31 July, a Hamas militant shot and stabbed a settler in his vehicle near Kiryat Arba, a settlement near Hebron.

On 6 August, a militant carried out a shooting attack in the Beka'ot settlement. On 11 August, Hamas carried out a drive-by shooting on two settlers on Route 90 near the Mehola settlement in the Jordan Valley, killing one and wounding the other. On 18 August, a militant killed an Israeli security guard with a hammer near the Kedumim settlement. That same day, a militant from Nablus carried out a suicide bombing in Tel Aviv, wounding one person. On 30 August, militants of the al-Aqsa Martyrs' Brigades used two car bombs to attack Israeli settlements near Hebron.

On 1 September, the Khalil al-Rahman Brigade killed three Israeli police officers who were driving near Hebron. On 8 September, a pro-Palestinian Jordanian gunman killed three Israeli personnel at the Allenby Crossing, at the border between Jordan and the West Bank. On 11 September, a militant carried out a ramming attack near the Givat Asaf settlement, killing one soldier. On 19 September, the al-Quds Brigades targeted the Shaked settlement with gunfire. The al-Aqsa Martyrs' Brigades targeted two IDF checkpoints at Mount Ebal and Mount Gerzim with gunfire on 19 September and 21 September, respectively.

On 1 October, two Hamas gunmen from Hebron carried out a shooting attack in Jaffa, Tel Aviv, killing seven people and injuring 17 others. On 6 October, the Mujahideen Brigades of the Palestinian Mujahideen Movement carried out a shooting attack on a gathering of IDF soldiers and settlers near Jenin. On 8 October, the al-Aqsa Martyrs' Brigades targeted an IDF checkpoint at Mount Gerzim with gunfire. On 11 October, the al-Aqsa Martyrs' Brigades targeted an IDF checkpoint at Qalandiya with an explosive, and fired at the Avnei Hefetz settlement near Tulkarm. On 19 October, PIJ targeted a vehicle in the Mevo Dotan settlement with gunfire. On the same day, a militant conducted a ramming attack against an Israeli police vehicle near the Ofra settlement, but was shot dead and did not inflict any casualties. PIJ conducted shooting attacks targeting IDF observation posts in Mevo Dotan on 24 October and a checkpoint at the Israel–West Bank border on 25 October. A PIJ militant targeted the Shaked settlement with gunfire on 28 October.

On 1 November, PIJ militants shot at Israeli forces near the Israel–West Bank border crossing. On 6 November, a militant attacked and injured two Israelis at the Shilo settlement. On 11 November, a militant conducted a car-ramming attack against two IDF soldiers at a checkpoint near Bethlehem. On 29 November, a Hamas militant opened fire on an Israeli bus near the Ariel settlement, injuring eight people.

On 7 December, a militant conducted a car-ramming attack near Hebron, injuring an IDF soldier and another Israeli. On 11 December, a militant carried out a shooting attack against an Israeli bus in al-Khader near Bethlehem, killing one Israeli child and injuring several others.

=== 2025 ===
On 6 January, militants killed three Israelis near the Kedumim settlement.

On 4 February, a Palestinian gunman attacked an Israeli checkpoint in Tayasir, killing two IDF soldiers and wounding another eight.

On 8 March, militants targeted an Israeli civilian vehicle traveling near Nabi Ilyas with Molotov cocktails. On 12 March, a militant shot and injured an Israeli near the Ariel settlement. On 21 March, near the Dolev settlement, a militant carried out a shooting attack targeting an Israeli bus and a Magen David Adom ambulance, after which he engaged in an hours-long exchange of fire with the IDF; eventually, he was killed with a helicopter strike. The attacks resulted in several casualties.

On 20 April, a Palestinian gunman opened fire at Israeli soldiers outside the Homesh outpost and was killed by return fire. On 30 April, two IDF reservists were injured by a bomb attack near the town of Beita southeast of Nablus.

On 7 May, a gunman opened fire on Israeli forces at the Reihan checkpoint, causing injuries. The same day, in Hebron, another militant attempted a car-ramming attack against IDF troops and then began stabbing soldiers. On 14 May, a gunman shot two Israelis near the Bruchin settlement, one of whom was a pregnant woman who later died from her injuries.

On 12 June, a gunman was killed after firing at Israeli troops at a checkpoint near the Hermesh settlement.

On 21 August, a gunman fired at Israeli settlers at the Malachei HaShalom outpost, wounding one, and fled to the nearby Palestinian village of Al-Mughayyir, Ramallah Governorate. The IDF then subsequently launched a raid on the village, capturing the attacker after two days.

On 8 September, gunmen conducted a mass shooting in East Jerusalem, killing six Israelis. On 12 September, a Palestinian assailant from East Jerusalem carried out a stabbing attack in Tzova, northwest of Jerusalem, wounding two Israelis. On 18 September, a Jordanian gunman shot and killed two Israelis at the Allenby Crossing. On 28 September, a Palestinian assailant from Nablus carried out a vehicle-ramming attack against IDF soldiers at the Jit junction near the Kedumim settlement, which resulted in the death of one soldier via friendly fire. On 30 September, two Israeli teenagers were wounded in a vehicle-ramming attack at the Al-Khader junction, carried out by a Palestinian attacker who was shot dead at the scene.

On 2 October, two militants attempted a vehicle-ramming and shooting attack against IDF soldiers at a checkpoint, without success; one was killed and the other was arrested.

On 10 November, a militant shot at Israeli police officers near the Beit Hagai settlement; the exchange of fire resulted in his death. On 18 November, two Palestinian attackers carried out a vehicle-ramming and stabbing attack at the Gush Etzion Junction. One Israeli was killed and three others were wounded.

On 1 December, a Palestinian attacker carried out a vehicle-ramming attack near the Kiryat Arba settlement, which left an IDF soldier lightly injured. On 2 December, two IDF soldiers were lightly wounded following a stabbing attack carried out near the Ateret settlement. On 6 December, a vehicle-ramming attack at an IDF checkpoint in Hebron left one Israeli soldier lightly wounded. On 14 December, IDF troops shot and killed a Palestinian who attempted to stab them at a junction near Hebron. On 26 December, a Palestinian attacker from Qabatiya carried out two separate attacks in northern Israel that resulted in the deaths of two Israelis.

=== 2026 ===
On 7 January, IDF troops operating near Beita were targeted by a Palestinian attacker throwing Molotov cocktails, but no injuries were reported.

On 12 March, the IDF said two Palestinian gunmen opened fire at an army post, and then attempted a car-ramming before being shot dead near Tapuah Junction.

== Role of the Palestinian Authority ==
=== PA conflict with militants ===
The Palestinian Authority (PA), which is largely seen by Palestinians as ineffective and subjugated to the Israeli occupation, has had a shared interest with Israel in suppressing militants even before the outbreak of the war. Cooperation between the PA security forces and the IDF is reflected by the fact that the former have simply remained in their barracks during IDF raids and have actively interfered with militants' defenses against those raids.

The July 2024 West Bank unrest directed against the Palestinian Authority was a major escalation in its conflict with the militants, sparked by the alleged arrest attempt of "Abu Shujaa", the leader of the Tulkarm Brigade, on 26 July. Protestors and militants clashed with security forces in Tulkarm, Jenin, Bethlehem, Tubas, and Nablus. By August, the unrest had been "contained", according to Tulkarm officials.

The PA also launched notable operations into Tubas in October 2024 and into Jenin in December 2024. PA forces began fighting alongside Israeli forces for the first time ever during Israel's 2025 "Iron Wall" operation.

=== Other incidents ===
There has been one case during the war where there was an incident between the IDF and the Palestinian Authority, that being the shooting death of a Palestinian Authority customs officer during an IDF raid into Tubas on 24 July 2024.

In the aftermath of the 3 October 2024 Tulkarm Camp airstrike by Israel, Laith Jaar, an Al Jazeera journalist who was covering the bombing was assaulted by a security officer, who threatened to shoot him. Jaar was subsequently arrested and detained by the security forces, and released a day later.

On 29 October 2024, Israeli settlers carried out a shooting attack against PA security forces near the Havat Gilad settlement, injuring 2 officers; the IDF condemned the attack and began an investigation into it.

On 10 July 2025, two PA police officers carried out a combined shooting and stabbing attack at the Gush Etzion settlement bloc, which resulted in one Israeli casualty. Hamas praised the attack, while the Palestinian Security Services were said to plan an internal investigation.

== Imprisonment and checkpoints ==
=== Freedom of movement ===
A report by B'Tselem found that the Israeli military had severely cracked down on Palestinians' freedom of movement, stating it was using "its network of checkpoints to tighten supervision, setting up dozens of new checkpoints, blocking access from dozens of villages to main roads, and revoking all permits for Palestinians to enter Israel for work or other reasons".

=== Mass detentions ===
The International Committee of the Red Cross expressed "high concern" regarding "the sharp increase in [the] number of arrests" in the occupied West Bank since October 7. Amnesty International has also criticized the "spike in arbitrary arrests" of Palestinians since October 7. Similarly, The Wall Street Journal reported that the rate of arrests in the occupied West Bank has "more than doubled" since that date.

On October 17, Al Jazeera reported that nearly 700 people had been arrested in the West Bank and occupied East Jerusalem since the outbreak of the war. By October 28, this number had climbed to 1,550, according to estimates by the Palestinian Prisoners Society. The Globe and Mail reported that Israel had advised the Palestinian Authority of the existence of 1,700 prisoners, but not their whereabouts, as of October 31. On November 6, Al Jazeera reported that 1,740 individuals had been arrested in overnight raids since the outbreak of the war; BBC reported the total number of arrestees at 2,150, according to the Palestinian Prisoners Society. The Associated Press placed the number at 2,280 on November 8, citing the Palestinian Prisoners Society; on November 10, The Nation reported that the number was "at least 2,200".

By November 8, the number of Palestinians held without charge or trial had increased from 1,319 to 2,070 since October 7, according to HaMoked. On November 15, Mondoweiss reported that arrests in the West Bank continued, with 54 Palestinians arrested the previous night in overnight raids. On November 28, the IDF told The Times of Israel that approximately 2,000 West Bank Palestinians had been arrested, while Palestinian monitoring groups reported 3,290 arrests. On December 3, the Palestinian Prisoners Society reported 3,480 arrests, while the IDF reported 2,150 as of December 4 and 3,450 as of December 6.

Al Jazeera reported that, as of January 10, 2024, nearly 6,000 Palestinians had been arrested in the West Bank since October 7, 2023. An estimated 3,000 were being held under administrative detention.

Detainees arrested in Deir Abu Mash'al, described the experience of being arrested by Israeli forces, stating that soldiers went door to door arresting people, blindfolding them, tying their hands, and taking them to an open building for interrogation. Family members of detainees stated the Israeli army was unjustly arresting and interrogating people.

Two directors and an employee from The Freedom Theatre were arrested by the IDF, with one stating, "They treated us like animals. They are trying to hurt us in anyway they can." One director, Mostafa Sheta, remained in custody and was believed to be held in the Megiddo military prison in northern Israel. The Royal Court Theatre responded to the reports by demanding for the release of the men. On 22 February 2024, a spokesperson for Birzeit University stated that Israeli forces had detained the undergraduate student council president, with more than sixty students arrested since 7 October. In March 2024, verified footage showed Israeli soldiers arresting a group of Palestinians, tying them up with rope, and dragging them. In July 2024, PEN International condemned the detention of the president of PEN Palestine Hanan Awwad in East Jerusalem.

In August 2024, Palestinian families in the West Bank reported hundreds of people were missing, with the Israeli military giving conflicting reports of their condition and whereabouts.

After Palestinian-American teenager Mohammed Ibrahim was abducted from his family's West Bank home and imprisoned at Ofer prison, a coalition of 100 human and civil rights groups petitioned US Secretary of State Marco Rubio to secure his release.

== Settler violence and depopulation of villages ==
=== Displacement by military ===
The UN Office for Humanitarian Affairs reported Israeli forces demolished residential structures in Furush Beit Dajan and Deir Ballut on 25 December. The UN reported 1,094 structures had been demolished and 2,127 Palestinians have been displaced in 2023. On 27 December, UNOCHA stated that since 7 October, 1,208 people had been displaced due settler violence, 393 due to lacking Israeli building permits, 95 on punitive grounds, and 483 due to army demolitions. On 15 January 2024, Israeli forces demolished two homes in Qalqilya, rendering 14 people homeless. By 15 January, the number displaced due to army demolitions had grown to more than 600.

In February 2024, a Palestinian activist whose family home in East Jerusalem was destroyed by Israel stated, "Israeli authorities want to rid [Jerusalem] of Palestinians and to change the makeup of the population." A U.S. State Department spokesman said that the demolitions "damage Israel's standing in the world". One man whose home was destroyed in East Jerusalem stated he had not even been able to pack his belongings. On 29 February, Peace Now reported that the Israeli government had seized a large swath of land, threatening three Palestinian communities. UNOCHA reported that Israel had demolished the homes of 155 Palestinians in just January and February 2024. In late-March 2024, UNOCHA reported that 1,640 people had been displaced in the West Bank and East Jerusalem since 7 October. The Colonization and Wall Resistance Commission stated 25 Bedouin communities had been displaced by Israel since 7 October.

In May 2024, around 50 Bedouin family homes were destroyed in the Negev desert. In July 2024, the Israeli Supreme Court rejected the appeal of 11 East Jerusalem families against their evictions. In 2024 alone, Israel seized 23.7sq km (9.15 sq miles) of Palestinian land in the West Bank, more than in the past 20 years combined. In August 2024, the Norwegian Refugee Council stated that 229 homes in East Jerusalem were demolished in 2023, the highest number on record. Some families were forced to destroy their own homes.

=== Displacement by settler pogroms and intimidation ===
==== List of villages ====
- Khirbet Zanuta (Arabic: خربة زنوتا, meaning "the ruin of Zanuta") is (or was) a Palestinian Bedouin village in the Hebron Governorate in the southern West Bank, located 20 kilometers south of Hebron. That was ethnically cleansed during the 2023 Gaza war. Some farmers remained or returned and the attacks continued. The location has previously been attacked in 2022.
- Al-Qanoub - In the Palestinian village of Al-Qanoub Israeli settlers descended from the nearby settlement of Asfar and the adjacent outpost of Pnei Kedem, burned houses, set their dogs on the farm animals, and, at gunpoint, ordered the residents to leave or else they would be killed.
- Al-Farsiya Khallet Khader – According to the Norwegian Refugee Council, 40 people were displaced, after which Israeli "settlers looted the community and stole nine tents".

==== Other settler violence ====
West Bank settlements (2025)

Instances of Jewish settler violence against Palestinians grew following 7 October attack. These attacks forced Palestinians to leave their homes, as part of what experts called a "systematic campaign" to remove Palestinians. On 11 October 2023, settlers killed a teenage boy in the back as he ran from their gunfire. The United Nations stated on 13 December eight Palestinians had been killed by settlers since 7 October. Israeli settlers, even before the war, had been allowed to act with impunity with most crimes going unpunished. They have been reportedly enabled and even protected by Israeli soldiers during their attacks. B'tselem called settler violence an "informal tool" of the IDF, since settlers and soldiers conduct joint operations against Palestinians. David Ignatius, an American journalist, described the situation in the West Bank as "a pattern of Israeli domination" and abuse. On 25 December, at least eight Palestinians were wounded in settler attacks. On 27 December, UNOCHA reported 367 Israeli settler attacks against Palestinians since 7 October. On 27 December, Shin Bet reported Israeli settlers were considering invoking din roder against Major General Yehuda Fox for confiscating illegal guns and arresting violent settlers.

In many cases, Israeli settlers impersonate Israeli soldiers in uniform, further confusing and intimidating Palestinians. Over 2,000 Palestinians have been displaced as a result of threats and violence. On 28 December, the Armenian Patriarchate of Jerusalem reported 30 armed Israeli settlers assaulted clergy in the Armenian Quarter of East Jerusalem. On 5 January, Peace Now, an Israeli organization that tracks settler activities in the West Bank, reported a large surge in settler construction of roadblocks, fences, and outposts. On 15 January 2024, settlers committed arson, threw rocks, and vandalized property in Deir Sharaf, Qalqilia, and Turmus Ayya. On 16 January, analyst Aref Daraghmeh stated settlers were using violence to take over the Jordan Valley. Israeli settlers in Nablus reportedly set fire a car showroom on 23 January. A total of 120 settler attacks were reported in January 2024. On 2 February, settlers reportedly wrote death threats and attempted to set a car on fire. On 12 February, Yesh Din reported a settler attack on Asira al-Qibliya.

Netta Amar Shiff, a Jewish human rights lawyer representing Palestinians in the West Bank, stated that the legal infrastructure in the occupied territories allows "settlers to do whatever they want." On 13 February, settlers from Yitzhar shot two Palestinians and threw molotov cocktails in Asira al-Qibliya. On 17 February, two children were beaten in a settler attack in Hebron. Peace Now stated, "Settler violence is not an isolated incident but rather a part of an organised strategy to dispossess Palestinians of their lands". The co-founder of Youth Against Settlements stated, "The big problem for Hebron now is that the extremist settlers have been recruited to the Israeli army units operating in the city. They now control the lives of Palestinian residents." The governor of Nablus reported a 200 percent increase in settler violence.

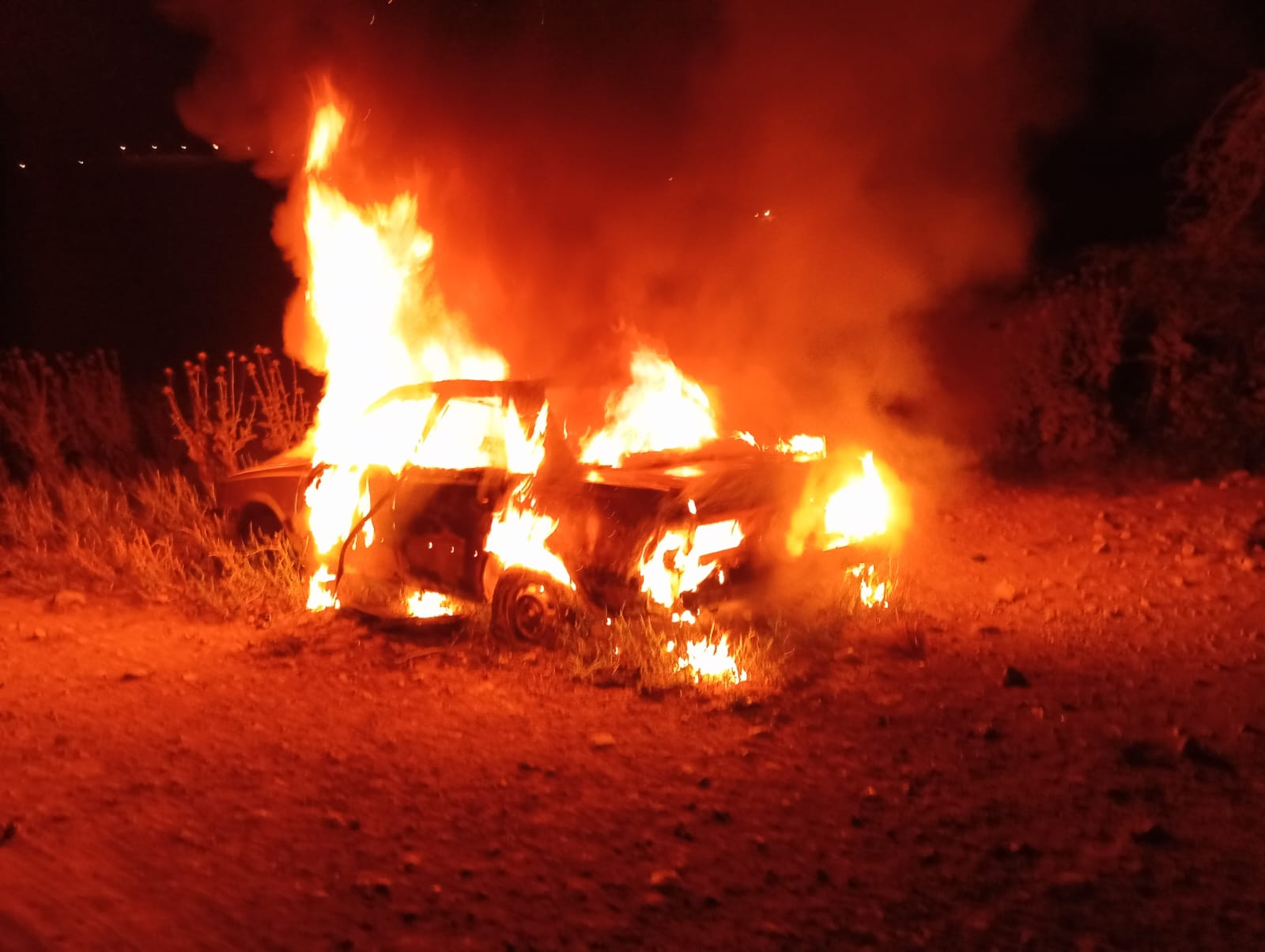
A Palestinian car set on fire by Israeli settlers during the April 2024 rampage

On 21 February, a settler attack was reported in Asira al-Qibliya, with the town council stating settlers threw rocks, broke a car windshield, and attempted to light a car on fire. Settlers assaulted two young men and stole their car. On 25 February, settlers in Jericho stormed a Bedouin community and stole their sheep. On 29 February, the mayor of Al-Lubban ash-Sharqiya stated, "The settlers are in the streets trying to attack [Palestinian] homes". On 4 March, a Palestinian Authority official stated that settler attacks had increased following Western sanctions on violent Israeli settlers. Ghassan Daghlas, the governor of Nablus stated that Israeli settler attacks were occurring "under the watchful eye of Israeli soldiers". The United Nations reported that it had recorded a "shocking" 603 Israeli settler attacks against Palestinians since 7 October. By April 2024, the UN-recorded number of settler attacks had risen to more than 700.

In April 2024, Israeli settler "rampages" against Palestinians reportedly resulted in multiple casualties, sparked by the killing of an Israeli teenager in the West Bank in, according to Israel, a suspected militant attack. In Al-Mughayyir, the violence was described as "the worst anyone here could remember." Human Rights Watch stated, "Settlers and soldiers have displaced entire Palestinian communities, destroying every home, with the apparent backing of higher Israeli authorities". In July 2024, Israeli settlers in Bazariya reportedly set a Palestinian building supply store and bulldozer on fire.

In September 2024, after an Israeli goat herder was beaten by several Palestinians near Jericho, settlers stormed a local elementary school where the assailants had reportedly fled, attacking teachers and students. The IDF arrived at the scene and detained the school principal and a teacher who were throwing stones at the attacking settlers.

=== Expanded settlements ===
The Israeli government approved new expansions in occupied East Jerusalem during the war. On 14 December, Amichai Chikli, the Social Equality Minister, stated Israeli settlements in the Gaza Strip were a possibility "in certain parts where it makes sense". On 30 December, Israeli finance minister Bezalel Smotrich stated the "future" of Gaza settlements would be determined after the war. In a later statement, Smotrich said Israelis in Gaza would "make the desert bloom". On 4 January, Israeli Defense Minister Yoav Gallant stated Israel would not have a "civil presence" in Gaza after the war but would retain unrestricted military movement in it. On 7 January, Itamar Ben-Gvir stated Israeli settlements in Gaza were the "order of the hour". On 8 January, Middle East Eye reported a group of MKs met with Nachala to discuss plans to build future Jewish settlements in Gaza. Israel approved 700 new settler units in East Jerusalem on 9 January.

Israeli tourism minister Haim Katz, as well as other Likud party members, announced a conference for Israeli settlements in Gaza in response to the 7 October attacks. The conference was planned to be hosted at Binyanei Hauma. It was held on 28 January and drew both Israeli cabinet ministers and members of parliament. Ben-Gvir was quoted stating, "In the first stage, we will encourage emigration – hundreds of thousands through a pilot, and we'll just transfer them". Ir Amim reported on 11 February that 17 settlements with around 8,400 units had been approved in East Jerusalem since the start of the conflict. On 22 February, Bezalel Smotrich approved 3,344 new settler homes in the West Bank. The move was criticized by Josep Borrell who stated it was "inflammatory and dangerous". The French Ministry of Foreign Affairs also condemned the announcement, stating, "Colonisation is incompatible with the creation of a Palestinian State. As well as being an obstacle to a lasting peace, this policy is also fuelling violence and tensions on the ground". The UAE, Germany, Qatar, and Bahrain also condemned the expansion. Denmark also condemned the expansion.

In March 2024, it was reported that sales of property in the West Bank were being promoted internationally with events being hosted in synagogues in the United States and Canada. After the Israeli government announced in March 2024 it was confiscating 800 hectares of land in the West Bank, the Israeli watchdog organization Peace Now stated it was the single largest land seizure since the passage of the 1993 Oslo Accords. The Palestinian Foreign Ministry condemned the expropriation as part of Israel's "theft" of the Palestinian homeland. The Arab Parliament condemned the land seizure. The European Union released a statement, saying, "In line with its longstanding common position and UN Security Council Resolutions, the EU will not recognise changes to the 1967 borders unless agreed by the parties".

On 31 March 2024, Smotrich announced an expanded Israeli settlement in Wadi Auja, calling it an "appropriate Zionist response" to an attack against Israelis in the Jordan Valley. Yitzhak Wasserlauf, an Israeli cabinet official, stated, "A total victory means a return to settle" the Gaza Strip. In May 2024, Defense Minister Yoav Gallant announced settlers evacuated from the West Bank in 2005 would be allowed to return.

In March 2024 it was reported that there were promotions for West Bank property sales international with sales being hosted in the United States and Canada at local synagogues. On 10 March, Israeli settlers in the Jordan Valley were reportedly building illegal settlements in the Ein al-Sakout village. "Pastoral settlements," or the seizing of grazing lands by Israel settlers, increased following 7 October. Between October 2023 and January 2024, West Bank settlers were documented having built at least 15 new outposts and 18 roads. The Palestinian Foreign Ministry condemned Israeli settler attempts "to plunder and steal Palestinian land". In June 2024, the Israeli government approved five new settlements in the West Bank, according to Israeli finance minister Bezalel Smotrich. The G7 condemned Israel's move to expand its West Bank settlements.

== Impacts ==
=== Education and economics ===
On 31 January 2024, a Fatah spokesman in Qalqilya stated that Israel's incursions were having economic impacts on the West Bank, stating, "Residents are suffering economically from the continuous closures, as occupation forces continue to close stores and impose a siege on the city." In May 2024, Israeli forces seized an estimated US$1 million from an exchange company.

The Palestinian Ministry of Education reported that due to the rise in Israeli raids and settler attacks, many schools across the West Bank had been forced to cease operations.

=== Water infrastructure and agriculture ===
In June 2026, Israeli bulldozers destroyed water pipelines and irrigation networks in Atuf and Ras al-Ahmar in the northern Jordan Valley, southeast of Tubas. The main water pipeline supplying nearby farms and areas was cut, along with smaller irrigation lines used for agricultural land. As a result, residents, livestock, and farmland in the area faced water shortages. The incident happened during ongoing land-leveling work and the construction of a 22-kilometer military road between the Ein Shibli and Tayasir checkpoints. Farmers said the work damaged irrigation systems and restricted access to their land, while Israeli authorities said the project was being carried out for security reasons.

=== Sanctions ===
On 30 January United States President Joe Biden signed an executive order which allowed the US to impose sanctions on Israeli settlers, with potential inclusion of Israeli politicians and government officials that were found to be involved with violent attack against Palestinians. Biden had earlier ordered the secretaries of state and treasury to prepare for the potential sanctions against Israeli individuals or entities that were involved in the violence against Palestinians in the West Bank. Israeli Finance Minister Bezalel Smotrich responded to Biden's order, saying it was based on "an antisemitic lie". Smotrich later stated, "We will not stand aside in the face of this injustice" and called for settlements to be "entrenched." Israel's National Security Minister Itamar Ben-Gvir praised the sanctioned settlers, calling them "heroic". Netanyahu criticized the sanctions and called them unnecessary. Following the U.S. sanctions, online fundraisers collected hundreds of thousands for the settlers. In March 2024, the U.S. sanctioned three additional settlers and two settler outposts.

On 4 February 2024, Canadian foreign minister Melanie Joly stated that her government was preparing to issue sanctions against extremist settlers. On 16 May, Canada sanctioned four West Bank settlers. On 27 June 2024, Canada sanctioned another seven settlers. The UK also issued sanctions on the four settlers and a second round of sanctions in May 2024. On 13 February, France stated that it was imposing sanctions on 28 settlers who have used violence against Palestinians in the West Bank. Spanish Foreign Minister José Manuel Albares said that Spain would implement settler sanctions if the European Union does not come to an agreement. Spain later announced sanctions on 12 violent Israeli settlers. On 18 March, the EU unanimously agreed to sanction violent Israeli settlers.

In July 2024, the U.S. announced sanctions against three Israeli individuals, four settler outposts, and a violent extremist organization in the West Bank. Soon after, the EU announced sanctions on five Israeli individuals and three for "serious and systematic human rights abuses".

=== Investigations ===
Following the killing of a Palestinian child in East Jerusalem by an Israeli police, the killer was interrogated, leading National Security Minister Itamar Ben-Gvir to call the questioning "outrageous" and "disgraceful". In response, Israel's attorney general Gali Baharav-Miara stated, "Criminal investigations, including those of police officers, are conducted with complete independence. Any intervention by you, directly or indirectly, violates the law... this should be stopped immediately".

== War crimes ==
During the war, the Israeli military was increasingly active in the West Bank. According to Amnesty International, Israel violated international humanitarian law by using disproportionate force during arrest raids, blocking medical assistance to people with life-threatening injuries, attacking paramedics, and conducting unlawful killings. Erika Guevara Rosas, Amnesty's director of global research, stated, "These unlawful killings are in blatant violation of international human rights law and are committed with impunity". Ben Saul, UN special rapporteur on human rights, stated that a November 2023 IDF killing of two boys appeared to be a war crime. On 5 March 2024, the Palestinian Red Crescent stated that it had recorded 427 violations against its medical mission by Israel in the West Bank, terming these a violation of international humanitarian law.

Israeli forces disguised as medical staff and civilians have shot dead three Palestinians inside a hospital in the city of Jenin in the occupied West Bank. Hospital says the men were 'assassinated'. Israel says they belonged to a 'Hamas terrorist cell'. The BBC called them "members of Palestinian armed groups". But, even if they are militants, it is a war crime to gadget them when wounded, and a war crime to impersonate doctors in the process. According to UN exports, the killing of three Palestinian men in a hospital in the occupied West Bank by Israeli commandos disguised as medical workers and Muslim women may amount to war crimes.

Following the demolition of a Palestinian activist's family home in East Jerusalem — part of a broader wave of forced displacement in the West Bank (Note: On 27 December 2023, UNOCHA stated that since 7 October, 1,208 people had been displaced due settler violence, 393 due to lacking Israeli building permits, 95 on punitive grounds, and 483 due to army demolitions.) — the European Union External Action Service stated, "Such acts are in violation of International Humanitarian Law". George Noll, head of the U.S. Office of Palestinian Affairs, condemned the demolition. Following the Israeli approval of around 3,500 new illegal settlements in the West Bank, UN human rights chief Volker Türk stated the transfer of Israel's population into the occupied territories was a "war crime under international law". Following the announcement that Israel was seizing 800 hectares of Palestinian land in the West Bank, the Federal Foreign Office stated, "The settlements violate international law and fuel further tensions in this extremely fragile situation." French president Emmanuel Macron condemned the expanded settlements, stating they "are contrary to international law".

BBC News reported in May 2024 that 11 soldiers of the Kfir Brigade (which is primarily active in the West Bank) posted on social media 45 photos and videos showing detained Palestinians; the Israeli Defence Forces did not respond when asked about the individual incidents or individual soldiers involved and identified, instead broadly stating: "In the event of unacceptable behavior, soldiers were disciplined and even suspended from reserve duty." BBC News further reported that the soldiers did not obscure their identities, with some of them posting under names of Yohai Vazana, Ofer Bobrov, Sammy Ben, and Ori Dahbash. According to BBC News, the "detained Palestinians are frequently shown blindfolded and restrained, having been forced to either lie on the floor, or squat, with their hands bound behind their backs", with some detainees being covered in Israeli flags.

On 13 March, the Palestinian Ministry of Foreign Affairs condemned the killing of six civilians, including children, in one day, stating, "These are war crimes and crimes against humanity according to international law". Belgian Foreign Minister Hadja Lahbib, stated, "Colonization and the increasing violence perpetrated by settlers in the West Bank are illegal. They must stop". In May 2024, Human Rights Watch stated, "Israeli security forces... have been killing Palestinians without a legal basis in the West Bank, including deliberately executing Palestinians who posed no apparent threat".

=== Triple assassination in a hospital ===
Israeli forces disguised as medical staff and civilians have shot dead three Palestinians inside a hospital in the city of Jenin in the occupied West Bank. Hospital says the men were 'assassinated'. Israel says they belonged to a 'Hamas terrorist cell'. The BBC called them "members of Palestinian armed groups". But, even if they are militants, it is a war crime to gadget them when wounded, and a war crime to impersonate doctors in the process. According to UN experts, the killing of three Palestinian men in a hospital in the occupied West Bank by Israeli commandos disguised as medical workers and Muslim women may amount to war crimes.

=== Abuse of ambulance ===
The Israeli military has admitted that on 19 December 2024, its troops used an ambulance or a vehicle disguised as an ambulance and displaying Palestinian license plates to carry out a surprise operation against alleged militants in the city of Nablus. The operation failed and no militants were captured or shot; however, Israeli soldiers who jumped from the ambulance and a nearby white van were filmed executing two civilians, a 25-year-old man and an 80-year-old woman, who was standing on the street talking to her neighbor. The elderly woman was shot and, after falling to the ground and raising her hand to ask for help, was shot again and died at the scene. "Israel is no longer trying to hide its war crimes and is acting as though the norms and rules of international law do not apply," declared B'Tselem.

== Reactions ==
=== Palestinian ===
On 28 December, Mustafa Barghouti, the general-secretary of the Palestinian National Initiative, stated Israel's raids across the West Bank were part of a plan to reoccupy the territory completely. Residents of the West Bank were reportedly frustrated by the lack of international coverage of the incursions in the territory, stating it allowed the IDF "to operate with almost impunity". Mohammad Shtayyeh, the Palestinian prime minister, stated Israel's financial pressure on the West Bank was an attempt to drive it from Gaza, and that "things might explode in the West Bank" if the worsening conditions were not addressed. On 9 January, the Palestinian Foreign Ministry warned Israel military actions and settler violence were threatening to "push the West Bank into an uncontrollable cycle of violence". Journalist Mohammed Jamjoom stated violent raids were "part of the fabric of daily life", with an average of 40 raids per day.

On 16 January, Israel released the body of a toddler killed by Israeli soldiers nine days prior, leading the Palestinian Ministry of Foreign Affairs to state, "What did they do with the body? Why did they keep it? Do they have the right to do so? And will they apologise to the child's family?" Palestinians in the West Bank stated the Israeli army regularly used bulldozers to destroy roads and infrastructure, describing the process as a form of collective punishment. Residents stated they believed Israel was attempting to turn them against the local resistance fighters.

Following the International Court of Justice's issuance of provisional measures in the South Africa v. Israel case, residents of the West Bank expressed disappointment it did not call for an immediate ceasefire, and expressed fear "the ruling in The Hague means Israeli army and settler violence in the occupied West Bank could get even worse". On 4 February, an advocate at Al-Haq stated, "The international community has given Israel [the green light] to do as it wishes without any form of accountability." Palestinian prime minister Mohammad Shtayyeh stated, "We are not very far from an explosion".

West Bank residents reported feeling they were being "forced into islands". Nidal Naghnaghiyeh, a local official in the Jenin camp, stated that Israeli forces had a "systemic policy of killing young men" in Jenin. The Palestinian Foreign Ministry stated Israeli checkpoints had turned the West Bank into a prison where Israeli forces and settlers could do whatever they want. In a joint statement in April 2024, Al-Haq, the Al Mezan Center for Human Rights, and the Palestinian Centre for Human Rights stated, "Violent Israeli military and settler attacks have been escalating in intensity and scale".

=== Israeli ===
A report by Yesh Din noted a rise in settler violence in the West Bank since 7 October but that Israeli law enforcement had not filed a single indictment. The Israeli military described the situation in the West Bank as "spiraling out of control". B'Tselem stated that Israel was operating in the West Bank with an "open-fire" policy. Israeli activists sought to prevent what they termed an unfolding ethnic cleansing in the West Bank. Mistaclim, a group of Israeli activists, described settler violence as "Jewish terrorism". In May 2024, Israeli finance minister Bezalel Smotrich addressed residents of the West Bank, stating, "We will turn you into ruins like in the Gaza Strip". Outgoing General Yehuda Fox criticized Israeli settler violence in July 2024, stating, "This is not Judaism in my eyes. At least not the one I grew up with in my father and mother's house. This is not the way of the Torah."

=== International organizations ===
Volker Türk, the United Nations High Commissioner for Human Rights, stated he was troubled by the use of military tactics, disproportionate force, and restrictions of movement in the West Bank and East Jerusalem. A United Nations official stated a lack of accountability and "egging on from Israeli officials" was leading to a rise in settler violence. Micheál Martin, the Irish deputy prime minister, stated what was happening in the West Bank was "shocking" and a violation of international humanitarian law. On 18 January, OHCHR called for an independent probe into the growing number of "unlawful" killings in the West Bank. On 19 January, UNRWA chief Philippe Lazzarini warned the West Bank was witnessing its highest levels of violence in "a tragic cycle of pain and suffering". Mustafa Barghouti stated on 20 January that Israeli settlers' aim was ethnic cleansing. Al-Baidar Organisation for Defending Bedouin Rights, a Bedouin civil rights group, stated their communities were being subjected to ethnic cleansing and forced displacement by Israeli soldiers and settlers. UNICEF reported on 28 January that children were living in "constant fear and grief".

In June 2024, Volker Türk stated, "It is unfathomable that so many lives have been taken in such a wanton fashion." Later the same month, Türk stated, "The situation in the West Bank, including East Jerusalem, is dramatically deteriorating".

On 2 September 2024, Francesca Albanese, the UN Special Rapporteur on the occupied Palestinian territories, warned that "Israel's genocidal violence risks leaking out of Gaza and into the occupied Palestinian territory as a whole." She urged the international community, "made of both states and non-state actors, including companies and financial institutions", to "do everything it can to immediately end the risk of genocide against the Palestinian people under Israel's occupation, ensure accountability and ultimately end Israel's colonisation of Palestinian territory."

=== International ===
German foreign minister Annalena Baerbock stated Israel had a responsibility to protect Palestinians in the West Bank. Melani Cammett, an American political scientist, stated on 18 January that the intensification of fighting in the West Bank indicated the war "is nowhere near over". On 18 January, Australian foreign minister Penny Wong visited the occupied West Bank, stating, "Australia is deeply concerned by ongoing settler violence against Palestinians in the West Bank". On 1 March, USAID director Samantha Power stated, "Repeated attacks by extremist Israeli settlers... sent shock waves of fear. This violence is intolerable and must stop." On 12 March, the Government of Jordan condemned the killing of two of their citizens in the West Bank, stating a young man had been "injured in the leg and the occupation forces left him bleeding inside the ambulance for more than an hour and a half before he died".

== See also ==
- List of invasions in the 21st century
- List of military engagements during the Gaza war
- Outline of the Gaza war
- Timeline of the Israeli–Palestinian conflict in 2023
- Timeline of the Israeli–Palestinian conflict in 2024
- Timeline of the Israeli–Palestinian conflict in 2025
- Timeline of the Israeli–Palestinian conflict in 2026
- Israeli settler violence
