= Shibli =

Shibli may refer to:

== Given name ==
- Shibli al-Aysami (1925–2011), Syrian politician
- Shibli Faraz, Pakistani Senator
- Shibli Mohammad (born 1965), a Bangladeshi dancer
- Shibli Nomani (1857–1914), India Muslim scholar
- Shibli Rubayat Ul Islam (born 1968), Bangladeshi politician
- Shibli Sadeeq (born 1982), Bangladeshi politician
- Shibli Sadik (1941–2010), Bangladeshi film director
- Shibli Shumayyil (1850–1917), Lebanese doctor

== Surname ==
- Abu Bakr Shibli (861–946), a 9th and 10th century Sufi mystic
- Adania Shibli (born 1974), Palestinian author and essayist
- Ahlam Shibli (born 1970), Palestinian artist
- Farid Ahmed Shibli, Bangladeshi judge
- Hamza Shibli (born 2004), Israeli-Arab footballer
- Qazi Shibli (born 1993), Kashmiri journalist

== Places ==
- Ein Shibli, Palestinian village
- Shibli, Iran, a village in East Azerbaijan Province, Iran
- Shibli, Israel, an Arab village on Israel's Mount Tabor in the Lower Galilee, since 1992 a component of the Shibli-Umm al-Ghanam local council
