= 2024 Tulkarm Camp airstrike =

Aistrike by the Israeli Defence Forces

2024 Tulkarm camp airstrike
- Part of the 2024 Israeli military operation in the West Bank
- Location in the West Bank
- Location: Tulkarm, West Bank, Palestine
- Date: 3 October 2024
- Target: Zahi Yaser Abd al-Razeq Oufi
- Attack type: Airstrike
- Deaths: 20+ Palestinians
- Perpetrators: Israel Defense Forces and Shin Bet

On 3 October 2024, the Israeli Defence Forces (IDF) conducted an airstrike on the Tulkarm Camp – a Palestinian refugee camp – in the West Bank. At least 20 people were killed, including 12 militants. It was the first Israeli strike in the area since 2002 during Operation Defensive Shield. Nour Odeh called it "the largest and deadliest air strike that we’ve seen in the occupied West Bank for over 20 years". The airstrike was a joint operation between the IDF and Shin Bet against Hamas.

== Bombing ==
The bombing was aimed at a busy coffee shop in the al-Hamam neighbourhood in Tulkarm Camp, and at least one missile hit a cafe in the camp. It was one of the largest airstrikes on the West Bank in more than two decades.

The IDF and Shin Bet stated that Zahi Yaser Abd al-Razeq Oufi, a Hamas commander planning to carry out an attack on the first anniversary of the October 7 attacks, was killed alongside six other members of Hamas and Palestinian Islamic Jihad (PIJ), including Ghaith Radwan, a senior PIJ commander. Hamas later confirmed Oufi as their commander, stating that he was killed alongside seven other members, while PIJ confirmed that Radwan was a commander of their group.

Laith Jaar, an Al Jazeera journalist who was covering the bombing, was assaulted by a Palestinian Authority security officer, who threatened to shoot him. Jaar was subsequently arrested and detained by the PA security forces, but was released the next day.

== Reactions ==
=== International ===
The United Nations Human Rights Office condemned the airstrike, calling it unlawful. The German Foreign Ministry stated on X that “The high number of civilian casualties in an Israeli airstrike in Tulkarem is shocking. In the fight against terror, the Israeli army is obliged to protect civilians in the West Bank.”

=== Palestinian entities ===
A spokesman for President of the State of Palestine Mahmoud Abbas called the attack a "heinous crime" against civilians. The Palestinian news agency WAFA said the attacks "will not bring security and stability to anyone, but will drag the region into more violence". Hamas condemned the strike but stopped short of confirming Oufi's death. Hamas later confirmed his death.

== See also ==
- Israeli incursions in Tulkarm
- Israeli incursions in the West Bank during the Gaza war
- Attacks on refugee camps in the Gaza war
