= Qabatiya =

Qabatiya قباطية
- Municipality type B

Arabic transcription(s)
  - Arabic: قباطية
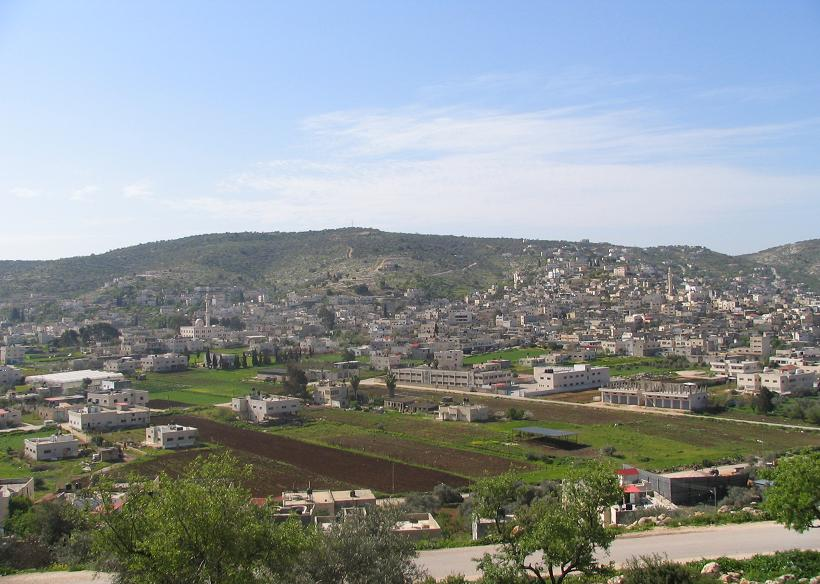
- Qabatiya general view (Eastern field)

- Location of Qabatiya within Palestine
- Coordinates: 32°24′35″N 35°16′51″E
- Palestine grid: 176/201
- State: State of Palestine (occupied by Israel)
- Governorate: Jenin

Government
  - Type: Municipality
  - Head of Municipality: Mr. Mahmoud Kameel

Area
  - Total: 50.55 km^{2} (19.52 sq mi)

Population (2017)
  - Total: 24,439
  - Density: 483.5/km^{2} (1,252/sq mi)
- Name meaning: “The Copts´place”

Qabatiya (Arabic: قباطية, also spelled Qabatia, Qabatya, and Kabatiya) is a city in Jenin Governorate, West Bank, Palestine. According to the Palestinian Central Bureau of Statistics (PCBS) census, the town had a population of 19,197 in 2007 and 24,439 by 2017.

Its entire land area is 50,547 dunams (50.5 km2; 19.5 sq mi), and its elevation is roughly 256 meters (840 feet). Qabatiya is famous for its olive groves, modern agriculture, and limestone industry.

== History ==
Sherds have been found here from Persian, Hellenistic, early and late Roman, Byzantine, early Muslim and Medieval eras. A Muslim traveller in the 12th century CE indicated it as "a village in the district of Jenin".

=== Ottoman era ===
Qabatiya, like all of Palestine was incorporated into the Ottoman Empire in 1517. In the 1596 tax registers, it was part of the nahiya ("subdistrict") of Jabal Sami, part of the larger Sanjak of Nablus. It had a population of 89 households and 18 bachelors, all Muslims. The inhabitants paid a fixed tax rate of 33.3% on agricultural products, including wheat, barley, summer crops, olive trees, goats and beehives, in addition to occasional revenues; a total of 14,920 akçe. Half of the revenues went to the Tarabay Bey of Lajjun. In 1105 AH (1693 CE) Abd al-Ghani al-Nabulsi mentioned a village on the road from Nablus to Jenin.

in 1838 Edward Robinson found it to be a very large village, surrounded by very extensive and beautiful olive groves, while in 1850, it was described as surrounded by gardens, built on the side of a wooden hill, covered with olive trees.

In 1870 Victor Guérin found gardens around Koubatieh planted with fig, olive and pomegranate trees, with vegetables underneath. It was a large village, divided into several areas under the jurisdiction of many different sheikhs. He further noted that “Kubataieh stands upon a rocky hill, whose sides are pierced by numerous cisterns of ancient origin, some of which are partly filled up and in bad repair; others are still used by the people. The latter are closed at the mouth by great round stones in form of a mill-stone, pierced in the centre. This second opening is itself closed by another stone, which is taken away when the water is drawn. This system of closed wells and cisterns by means of a stone is of extreme antiquity. It is found in many parts of Palestine, and was in use before the Hebrew conquest.”

In 1882, the PEF's Survey of Western Palestine described it as a “large stone village on a slope, east of a small plain which is full of olives. It has a sacred place on the south (Sheikh Theljy), and a good orange garden near the village.”

=== British Mandate era ===
In the 1922 census of Palestine, conducted by the British Mandate authorities, Qabatiya had 1,803 inhabitants; 1,799 Muslims and four Christians, where the Christians were all Orthodox. This increased to 2,447 in the 1931 census; two Christians and the rest Muslims, in a total of 551 houses.

In the 1945 statistics the population of Qabatiya, together with Kh. Tannin, was 3,670, all Muslims, with 50,547 dunams of land, according to an official land and population survey. The city had 9,542 dunams used for plantations and irrigable land, 21,464 dunams for cereals, while 113 dunams were built-up (urban) land and 19,428 sunams were classified as "non-cultivable".

=== Jordanian era ===
In the wake of the 1948 Arab–Israeli War, and after the 1949 Armistice Agreements, the Jenin-area came under Jordanian rule, together with the rest of the West Bank.

In 1961, the population of Qabatiya was 5,917.

=== Post-1967 ===
Since the Six-Day War in 1967, Qabatiya has been under Israeli occupation.

After Oslo II in 1995, Qabatiya came under Palestinian Authority (PA) administration, in what is now known as Areas A and B.

Approximately ten Palestinians were killed between October 2015 and July 2016 while carrying out attacks against Israelis. In July 2016, clashes between Palestinians and Israeli armed forces occurred during a house demolition by Israel of a man accused of being involved in an attack in Jerusalem. The Israeli military reported that the military convoy that carried out the demolition was met by Molotov cocktails and fire from improvised guns. Palestinian officials reported six Palestinians wounded in the exchange, with the Israeli military confirming three Palestinians hit. Israel calls the demolition of homes of attackers as a deterrent to violence, while human rights groups and Palestinians condemn it as a form of collective punishment.

In 2023, the city was stormed.

In September 2024, the city was stormed by again. Israeli military, flanked by military bulldozers, surrounded and opened fire near Izzat Abu al-Rab School and Qabatiya School, leaving over 1,200 pupils and teachers besieged. The Israeli military was filmed throwing bodies of Palestinians off the 3rd floor of a house in Qabatiya, it happened after at least seven people were killed by Israeli forces in the town on the 29th of September. The desecration of corpses is a war crime, armed forces are obliged to ensure that bodies, including those of enemy fighters, are treated with respect and return them to their families. The Israeli military opened fire on a group of journalists filming the events.

On December 26, 2025, the Israeli army started continuously leading raids in the city. 45 armored vehicles and 3 bulldozers had entered Qabatiya. Entrance and exits were blocked by IDF personnel, locking residents in their homes.

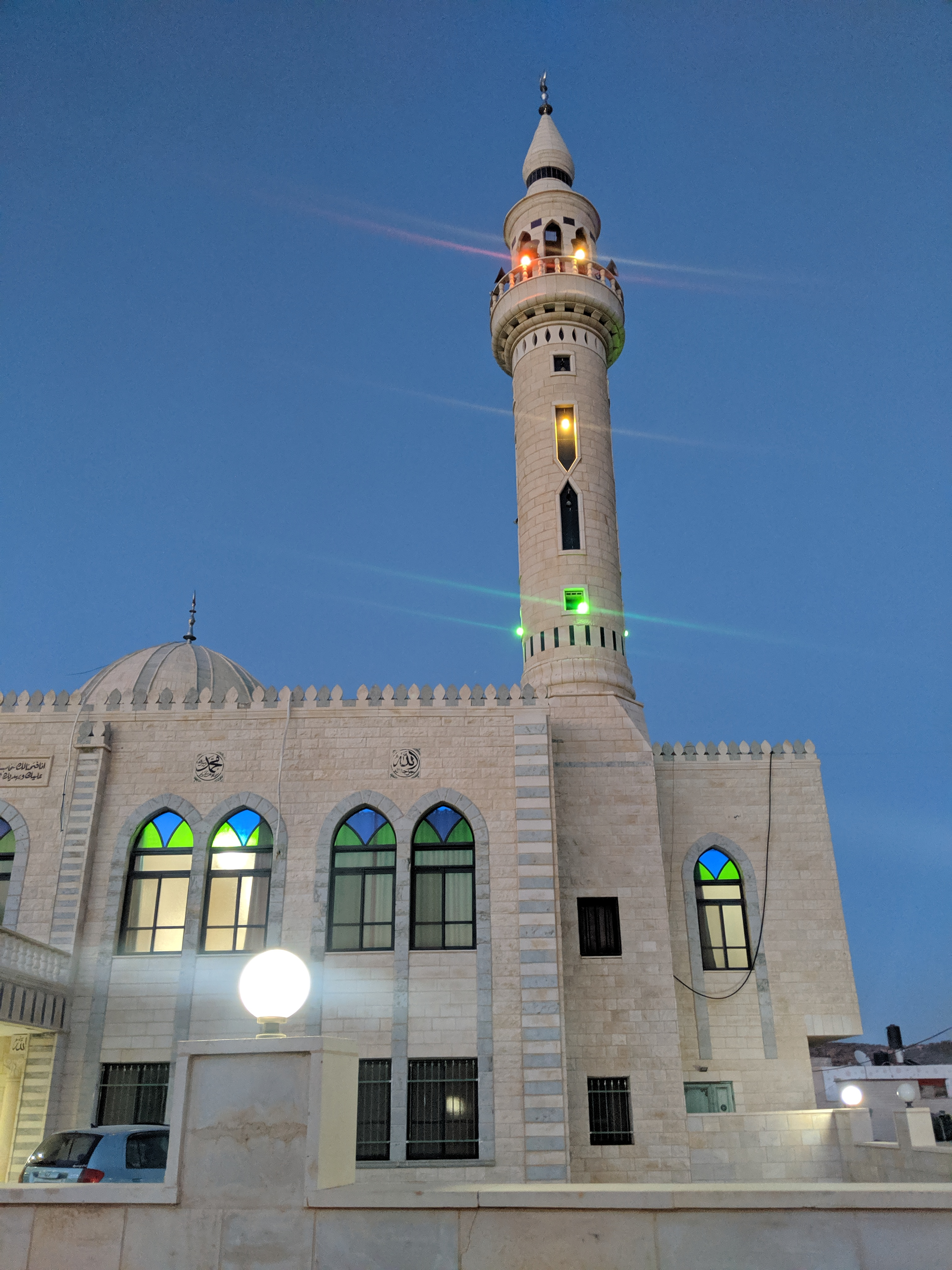
Khaled Ibn Al-Waleed Mosque in 2019

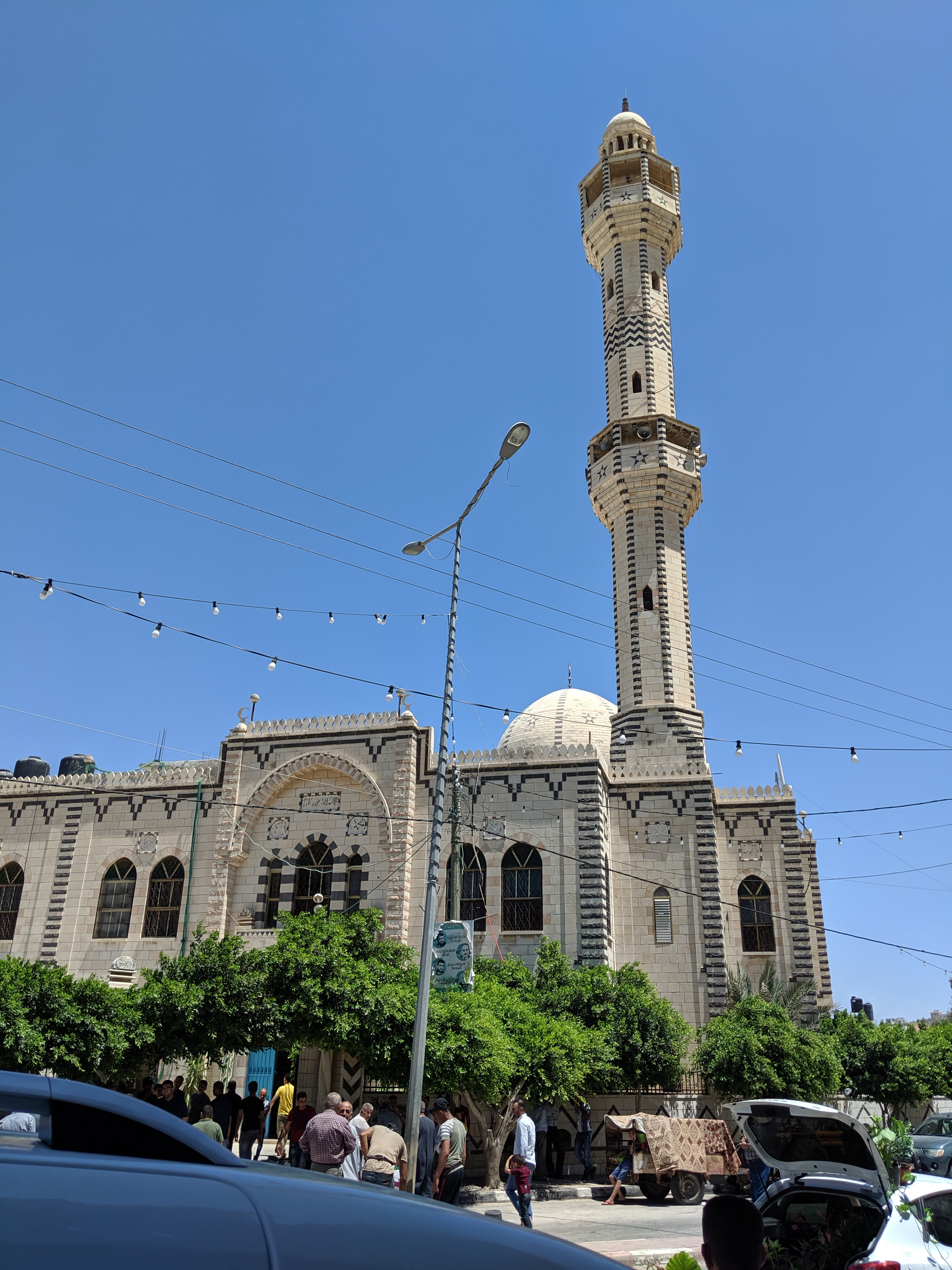
Salah Al Din in mosque (2019)

== Bibliography ==
- Barron, J.B., ed. (1923). Palestine: Report and General Abstracts of the Census of 1922. Government of Palestine.
- Bornstein, Avram S. (2002). Crossing the Green Line Between the West Bank and Israel. University of Pennsylvania Press. ISBN 0812217934.
- Conder, C.R.; Kitchener, H.H. (1882). The Survey of Western Palestine: Memoirs of the Topography, Orography, Hydrography, and Archaeology. Vol. 2. London: Committee of the Palestine Exploration Fund.
- Government of Jordan, Department of Statistics (1964). First Census of Population and Housing. Volume I: Final Tables; General Characteristics of the Population (PDF).
- Government of Palestine, Department of Statistics (1945). Village Statistics, April, 1945.
- Guérin, V. (1874). Description Géographique Historique et Archéologique de la Palestine (in French). Vol. 2: Samarie, pt. 1. Paris: L'Imprimerie Nationale.
- Hadawi, S. (1970). Village Statistics of 1945: A Classification of Land and Area ownership in Palestine. Palestine Liberation Organization Research Center.
- Hütteroth, W.-D.; Abdulfattah, K. (1977). Historical Geography of Palestine, Transjordan and Southern Syria in the Late 16th Century. Erlanger Geographische Arbeiten, Sonderband 5. Erlangen, Germany: Vorstand der Fränkischen Geographischen Gesellschaft. ISBN 3-920405-41-2.
- Khaldi, Ahmed el-Safadi (1935). Tarih Fakhr ed-Din bin Ma'an wa-Abnahu Ali (in Arabic). Beyrouth.
- Mills, E., ed. (1932). Census of Palestine 1931. Population of Villages, Towns and Administrative Areas. Jerusalem: Government of Palestine.
- Monro, V. (1835). A summer ramble in Syria, with a Tartar trip from Aleppo to Stamboul. Vol. 1. London: R. Bentley. (Monro, 1835, vol 1, p. 277, cited in Robinson and Smith, vol 3, p. 154)
- Morris, B. (2011). Righteous Victims: A History of the Zionist-Arab Conflict, 1881-1998. Knopf Doubleday Publishing Group. ISBN 978-0307788054.
- Palmer, E.H. (1881). The Survey of Western Palestine: Arabic and English Name Lists Collected During the Survey by Lieutenants Conder and Kitchener, R. E. Transliterated and Explained by E.H. Palmer. Committee of the Palestine Exploration Fund.
- Robinson, E.; Smith, E. (1841). Biblical Researches in Palestine, Mount Sinai and Arabia Petraea: A Journal of Travels in the year 1838. Vol. 3. Boston: Crocker & Brewster.
- Saulcy, L.F. de (1854). Narrative of a journey round the Dead Sea, and in the Bible lands, in 1850 and 1851. Vol. 1, new edition. London: R. Bentley.
- Zertal, A. (2004). The Manasseh Hill Country Survey. Vol. 1. Boston: BRILL. ISBN 9004137564.
