= Ein Shibli =

Municipality type C in Nablus Governorate, State of Palestine

Coordinates: 32°13′45″N 35°25′26″E

Ein Shibli (Arabic: عين شبلي) is a Palestinian village in the Nablus Governorate in northern West Bank, located 15.6 kilometers east of Nablus. According to the Palestinian Central Bureau of Statistics (PCBS), the village's population was estimated to be 313 inhabitants in 2017. Ein Shibli has a total area of approximately 567 dunums of which 296 are arable land and 32 dunums are registered as residential.

== History ==
One account suggests that the name of the village originates from a notorious bandit named Shibli who resided near a water spring in the village and would rob travelers, leading to the village being named after him.

Ein Shibli was founded in 1948, and its inhabitants originally migrated from Jaffa and Al Hamma. According to the 1997 Census, 141 of the 148 residents of Ein Shibli were registered refugees, the highest percentage of any non-refugee camp locality.

Under the Oslo II Interim Agreement signed on 28 September 1995, Ein Shibli was divided into two areas, namely Area B and Area C. Area B encompasses approximately 385 dunums, which accounts for 68% of the village's total area. In this area, the Palestinian National Authority (PNA) exercises full control over civil matters, while Israel retains ultimate responsibility for security. On the other hand, Area C, constituting 182 dunums or 32% of the total area, remains under Israel's complete control in terms of security and administrative affairs. In Area C, Palestinian construction and land management are restricted unless authorized or permitted by the Israeli Civil Administration. The majority of Ein Shibli's population resides in Area B.

Since the October 7 attacks, residents of Ein Shibil have faced increasing harassment and violence from local Israeli settlers. More than 100 people were forced to flee there homes in October 2023 after being threatened by armed settlers.

== Economy ==
The economy in Ein Shibli depends mainly on its agricultural sector, which employed 50% of the village's workforce in 2013, according to the village's council.

The results of a 2013 field survey conducted by Applied Research Institute - Jerusalem (ARIJ) indicated that the agriculture sector accounted for 50% of the labor force, while the Israeli labor market employed 30% of the workforce. The employees sector represented 10% of the labor force, followed by the trade sector at 5%, and the services sector also at 5%.

In 2013, the unemployment rate in Ein Shibli was 70%.

== Education ==
According to the PCBS, in 2007, Ein Shibli had an illiteracy rate of approximately 18.2% among its population, with 65% of the illiterate individuals being female. Out of the total population, 17.7% possessed basic reading and writing skills without formal education, 21.4% had completed elementary education, 23.2% had received preparatory education, 13.6% had completed secondary education, and 5% had attained higher education

The village has one public school, Ein Shibli co-educational Elementary School, which operates under the Palestinian Ministry of Higher Education. As of 2012, there was no kindergarten available in the village, according to the Directorate of Education in Nablus. As of 2013, there was no secondary level education provided in the village and thus students from Ein Shibli enrolled at Al Aqrabaniya Secondary School in the nearby village of Al Aqrabaniya, located 4 km away.

== Infrastructure ==
=== Electricity and telecommunication services ===
Ein Shibli has been connected to a public electricity network since 1985 and is served by the Israeli Qatari Electricity Company. In 2013, 100% of the housing units in the village were connected to the network and 15% of the housing units within the village were connected to phone lines.

=== Water supply ===
Ein Shibli is provided with water by the Ein Shibli spring through the public water network established in 1985. In 2013, all housing units were connected to the public water network. In 2012, the quantity of water supplied to the village was recorded as approximately 36,000 cubic meters.

=== Waste management ===
Ein Shibli lacks a public sewerage network, leading to the use of unhygienic cesspits for wastewater disposal. Solid waste management is generally well-handled, with waste collected and disposed of in a landfill in Jenin Governorate.
