= Timeline of the Gaza war (19 January 2025 – 17 March 2025) =

- Initial attacks; (7–27 October 2023); Invasion of the Gaza Strip; (28 October 2023 – 23 November 2023); First ceasefire; (24 November 2023 – 11 January 2024); Yemen airstrikes; (12 January 2024 – 6 May 2024); Rafah offensive; (7 May 2024 – 12 July 2024); Al-Mawasi attack; (13 July 2024 – 26 September 2024); Attack on Hezbollah headquarters; (27 September 2024 – 16 October 2024); Killing of Yahya Sinwar; (17 October 2024 – 26 November 2024); Israel–Lebanon ceasefire agreement; (27 November 2024 – 18 January 2025); Israel–Hamas ceasefire agreement; (19 January 2025 – 17 March 2025); March 2025 Israeli attacks on the Gaza Strip; (18 March 2025 – 15 May 2025); May 2025 Gaza offensive; (16 May 2025 – 19 August 2025); August 2025 Gaza offensive; (20 August 2025 – 2 October 2025); October 2025 Israel–Hamas ceasefire agreement; (3 October 2025 – present)

== January ==
=== 19 January ===
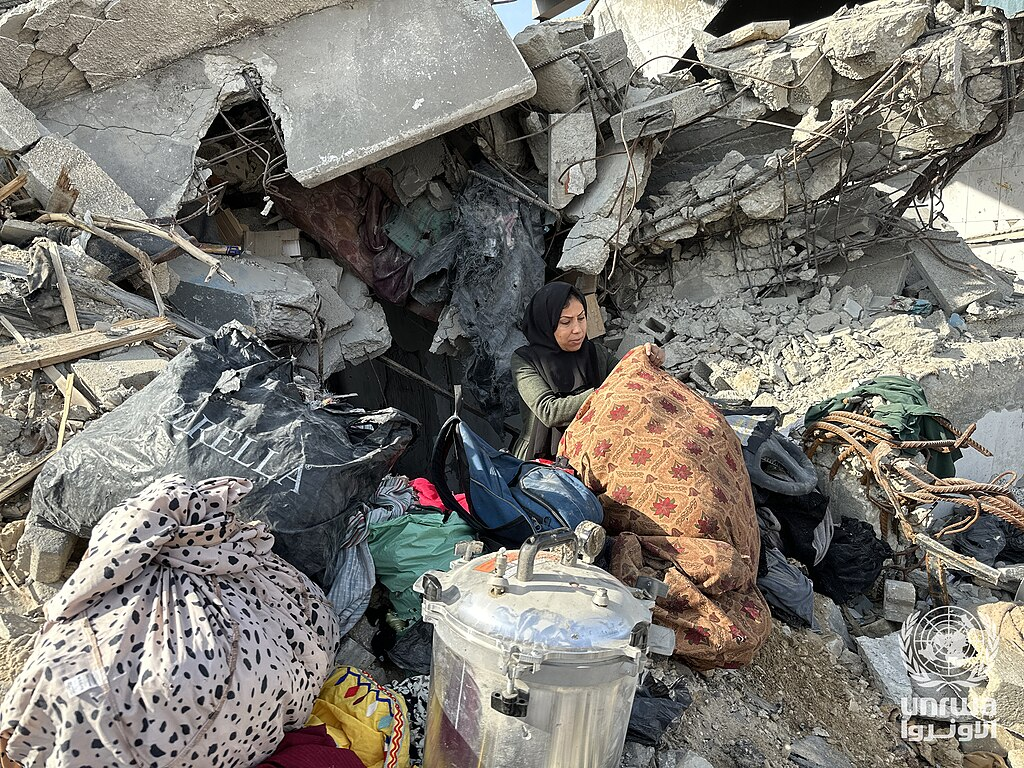
A Palestinian woman in Jabalia refugee camp preparing to return to her home in northern Gaza on 19 January, following news of the ceasefire

- The Gaza Health Ministry reported that at least 25 Palestinians were killed in the past 24 hours, increasing its count of the Palestinian death toll in Gaza to 46,913. (Note: Casualty count includes both militants and civilians. For further information see Casualties of the Gaza war § Civilian to combatant ratio.)
- The Houthi-run Al-Masirah media outlet reported that US forces launched four attacks on the Al-Azraqeen area north of Sanaa.
- The IDF announced that it recovered the remains of soldier Oron Shaul, who was killed and captured by Hamas during the 2014 Gaza War in a joint operation with the Shin Bet.
- The IDF said that it conducted airstrikes against Hamas targets in Gaza including armed Hamas operatives parading on pickup trucks prior to ceasefire and buildings used by it.
- The ceasefire agreement between Israel and Hamas went into effect at 11:15 a.m. UTC+02:00.
- The first three Israeli civilian female hostages to be released as part of the ceasefire agreement were released by Hamas.
- The IDF reported it have killed about 3,000 militants and arrested hundreds in its offensive in north Gaza.
- The Far-right Israeli National Security minister Itamar Ben-Gvir resigned from his office in protest against the ceasefire agreement with Hamas.
- Militant groups reportedly opened fire on the Palestinian National Security Forces (NSF) in Jenin refugee camp.
- The IDF's Givati Brigade and Nahal Brigade withdrew from Jabalia and Beit Hanoun in the northern Gaza Strip, Israeli forces also withdrew from parts of Rafah.
- The Houthis announced that it would stop attacks against ships in the Red Sea Corridor excluding Israeli ships due to the January 2025 Gaza war ceasefire and stop attacks against Israeli ships upon the full implementation of all stages of the truce. It also said that it will attack the ships of other states in the event of any attack against it.
- Hamas confirmed the death of deputy commander of al-Qassam Brigades, Marwan Issa.

=== 20 January ===
- The Gaza Health Ministry reported that at least 60 Palestinians were killed in Israeli attacks in the past 24 hours, increasing its count of the Palestinian death toll in Gaza to 47,035.
- The first batch of 90 Palestinian prisoners that were released as part of the ceasefire agreement arrived in the West Bank.
- An IDF reservist was killed and four others were injured, including a senior officer in critical condition after their David light armored vehicle hit a roadside bomb during a patrol in Tammun.
- Wafa reported that the IDF killed two Palestinians including a boy in central and southern areas of Rafah, and wounded nine Palestinians including children in Rafah. Palestinians said that the IDF, including tanks, went further into Gazan territory than the agreed buffer zone (850 meters from the border instead of 700 meters) and opened heavy fire on civilians.
- Wafa reported that the IDF shot and killed Zakariya Barbakh, a teenager, in the vicinity of Al-Awda roundabout in central Rafah and wounded another child who was trying to recover the boy's body. The IDF said that it shot suspects who approached its soldiers in Rafah.
- Bodies of 97 people were recovered from Rafah.
- Palestinian media reported that Israeli settlers set fire to houses and vehicles in Jinsafut and al-Funduq, injuring 21 Palestinians. The IDF said that they also attacked its soldiers. Two Israelis were wounded by gunfire in the vicinity of Ramat Gilad. Israeli Public Broadcasting Corporation reported that they were shot by an Israeli police officer after they pepper sprayed him.
- Israeli human rights organisation Yesh Din reported Israeli settler attacks against Palestinians in four areas in the West Bank.

=== 21 January ===
- The Gaza Health Ministry increased its count of the Palestinian death toll from Israeli attacks in Gaza to 47,107. The IDF reported it have killed nearly 20,000 Hamas operatives.
- US president Donald Trump removed his predecessor Joe Biden's sanctions against violent Israeli settlers in West Bank.
- Wafa reported that two people were wounded by an Israeli drone and gunfire in Gaza.
- The IDF said that it started a major operation in Jenin. The Palestinian Health Ministry said that 10 people were killed and at least 40 others were wounded, including children and medical staff. Those killed included a 16-year-old boy.
- Herzi Halevi announced his resignation as IDF chief of staff effective 6 March to take responsibility for the IDF's failure to prevent the 7 October attacks.
- A stabbing attack in Tel Aviv wounded four men. The attacker was shot and killed at the site. Police said that it was a terrorist attack.
- Gaza Civil Defense said that it recovered 120 decomposed bodies in the last two days.
- Israeli border police said that it shot three rock-throwing Palestinians, including a 12-year-old boy, in Shu'fat Camp in East Jerusalem.

=== 22 January ===
- Israeli shelling was reported on the coast of Gaza City.
- The Palestinian Health Ministry said that a 45-year-old woman died in Beit Einun checkpoint after Israeli forces barred her from being taken to hospital after suffering a heart attack.
- The IDF reported that it killed 10 Palestinian militants, struck infrastructure and dismantled explosives during its ongoing operation in Jenin.
- Palestinian media reported that the body of a Hamas militant who killed an Israeli border police officer in 2021 was recovered after he was killed during fighting in Jabalia.
- Al Jazeera reported that The IDF ordered civilians to evacuate from some areas of Jenin refugee camp. Israeli authorities denied the claim.
- The Houthis announced the release of the 25 crew of the cargo vessel Galaxy Leader, which the group seized in November 2023.
- Israeli forces issued demolition notices for seven houses belonging to Palestinians in Idna.
- Al Jazeera reported that Israeli firing in Rafah's Shaboura camp killed at least one Palestinian and wounded others who were removing rubble from destroyed houses.
- Hamas accused the NSF of besieging Al-Razi Hospital in Jenin and arresting injured fighters. Fatah called Palestinians to be alert against Hamas statements and accused Al Jazeera of distorting operations by PA security forces in the West Bank.
- Gaza Civil Defense said that it recovered approximately 200 bodies from under the debris in Gaza.
- NNA reported that Israeli forces burned down and destroyed houses in Taybeh.
- The IDF said that its Givati Brigade withdrew from Jabalia.
- The Jenin Brigades said that it inflicted casualties on Israeli soldiers near a besieged house in Burqin.
- NNA reported that the Israeli strikes caused two large explosions on the outskirts of Mais al-Jabal.
- The IDF reported that it killed Akram Zanoun, a PIJ militant "who posed a threat" in southern Gaza.
- The al-Qassam Brigades said that it engaged in fierce clashes with Israeli soldiers in Arraba and Fahma using machineguns and locally manufactured explosive devices.
- The Lebanese Army said that it concluded its deployment in Kfarchouba following the IDF withdrawal. NNA reported that that Israeli forces blew up at least three houses in Deir Mimas.
- The al-Qassam Brigades said that it targeted an IDF bulldozer by detonating an explosive device in the vicinity of a cinema in Jenin.
- The Houthis were re-designated as Foreign Terrorist Organisation by US President Donald Trump after his previous designation was reversed by his predecessor Joe Biden citing the need of mitigating one of the world's worst humanitarian crisis.

=== 23 January ===
- The Gaza Health Ministry reported that 122 bodies were recovered in the past 24 hours, increasing its count of the Palestinian death toll in Gaza to 47,283.
- Israeli forces were accused of using women as human shield in Burqin. A Palestinian media outlet reported that two Palestinian militants were killed after a clash with Israeli forces in Burqin. The IDF said that those two militants participated in the al-Funduq gun attack which killed two Israeli female civilians and an off-duty Israeli police officer on 6 January. An Israeli soldier was moderately injured.
- The NSF detained Al Jazeera reporter Mohammed al-Atrash after stopping him from covering the ongoing Israeli raid in Jenin.
- Heavy fire from Israeli tanks were reported in the vicinity of the Kerem Shalom border crossing.
- Israeli forces arrested a woman from Tulkarem.
- Israeli police said that it arrested an East Jerusalem resident suspected of collaborating with Hezbollah.
- The al-Quds Brigades said that it clashed with Israeli forces in Jenin.
- Gaza Civil Defense said that Israeli tank fire killed two Palestinians in Tel al-Sultan refugee camp. The IDF said that soldiers opened fire on several threats during the truce.
- Israeli forces cut off electricity in Jenin refugee camp and nearby areas, jeopardizing emergency operations of hospitals.
- The al-Quds Brigades said it had inflicted injuries by detonating an explosive device in an IDF vehicle.
- An Israeli court ordered the eviction of 26 Palestinian families from Batn al-Hawa neighbourhood in East Jerusalem's Silwan district, stating that they were allegedly constructed on land belonging to Jews before 1948.

=== 24 January ===
- US intelligence estimated that 10,000 to 15,000 Hamas fighters were killed during the war in Gaza while a same number were recruited during that period, many of whom were young and untrained and are used for simple security purposes.
- The Associated Press, citing reports of the Palestinian Authority's Commission of Prisoners' Affairs reported that an autopsy indicated that a Palestinian man who died in Israeli jail was tortured.
- Israeli force were targeted using an explosive device by Palestinian fighters in Nazareth Street, Jenin. Clashes erupted between the NSF and Palestinian fighters in Yabad. Palestinian fighters were reportedly beaten by PA security forces and arrested.
- A video shared by Hamas-affiliated media outlet Gaza Now showed Hamas militants executing several Palestinians, stating that they were found guilty of collaboration with Israel.
- Security sources told Asharq Al-Awsat that the Lebanese Army carried out 500 missions to dismantle Hezbollah military infrastructure south of the Litani river per the 2024 Israel–Lebanon ceasefire agreement. Sources monitoring the implementation of the deal said that Hezbollah is "fully cooperating with the decisions of the Lebanese authorities".
- Wafa reported that Israeli forces shot and wounded an elderly man during their ongoing raid in Jenin refugee camp.
- An Israeli raid in Jenin killed 12 people including militants and wounded dozens.
- The IDF said that it conducted strikes in southern Lebanon to "remove threats" in recent days.
- Israeli forces arrested at least 22 Palestinians including a woman from the West Bank.
- Israeli Prime Minister Benjamin Netanyahu said that the IDF will not complete its withdrawal from southern Lebanon by the 60-day deadline stated in the 2024 ceasefire agreement, saying that Lebanon "has not yet fully enforced" its obligations under the truce. US President Donald Trump supported a short and temporary extension.
- The UN suspended operations in Houthi-run areas of Yemen after its staff were detained by the Houthis.
- Hamas confirmed the death of Rawhi Mushtaha, the de facto prime minister of the Gaza and Sami Odeh, the head of general security mechanism of Hamas in an Israeli air strike.
- The Jenin Battalion said it had inflicted injuries among Israeli forces and destroyed an IDF vehicle in Jenin's al-Damaj neighborhood.
- The IDF and Shin Bet confirmed conducting a drone strike on a vehicle allegedly carrying Palestinian militants in the vicinity of Qabatiya. The Palestinian health ministry confirmed two deaths.
- The IDF said that it opened fire in Gaza several times against threats in the last day.
- The al-Qassam Brigades said that it inflicted injuries among Israeli forces in an ambush in the al-Damj neighbourhood of the Jenin refugee camp.
- Decomposed bodies of 17 people were recovered from the rubble of destroyed houses in Rafah.
- Palestinian media outlets reported that the IDF opened fire on a group of journalists gathered on the main road leading to the Government Hospital in Jenin to report the ongoing raids in Jenin refugee camp.
- The Lebanese Army deployed forces to Chihine and al-Jebbin after the IDF's withdrawal.
- Israeli forces raided the house of Palestinian prisoner Zakaria Zubeidi in the Jenin refugee camp and allegedly ordered his family not to celebrate his release.

=== 25 January ===
- Palestinian fighters detonated an explosive device in the vicinity of an IDF patrol vehicle during clashes in Silat al-Harithiya.
- The Jenin Brigades said it had inflicted injuries on Israeli forces by detonating a "KG37" ground explosive device on IDF vehicles in Jenin.
- At least 14 people including militants were killed and dozens including Palestinian children, medical staff and elderly people were injured in the ongoing Israeli raid in Jenin.
- Israeli forces opened fire at houses in the vicinity of Maghazi refugee camp.
- Four female IDF hostages were released by Hamas.
- Prime Minister Netanyahu's office said that Israel will release the security prisoners in return for the four female IDF hostages freed per the agreement. His office also added that Israel will not allow the passage of Gazans to north Gaza until the release of civilian Arbel Yehud.
- Two hundred Palestinian prisoners were released by Israel. Around 70 of them were released into Egypt.
- The IDF warned residents against returning to dozens of Lebanese villages in the vicinity of the Israeli border till further notice.
- The IDF said that three soldiers of the Egoz Unit were injured, one of them critically, in the same incident during the raid in Jenin.
- Palestinian media reported that Israeli fire killed one person and wounded several others on Salah al-Din Road in central Gaza. They also reported that one person was killed and several others were injured after Israeli forces opened fire on Gazans approaching the Netzarim Corridor.
- Israeli forces raided the house of released Palestinian prisoner Ashraf al-Zagheer in Kafr Aqab, north of East Jerusalem, hours after he was released from Ofer Prison. They also prohibited all celebrations after the Hamas flag was raised during a gathering for his return. Wafa also reported that Israeli forces opened fire during the raid, injuring two people. The Palestinian Prisoners Club reported that Israeli forces arrested his brother and raided the house of two other prisoners released under the ceasefire. The IDF said that it was preventing celebrations, parades in West Bank for Palestinian prisoners released in the agreement. Israeli forces also raided cities and towns where Palestinian prisoners were released. A New York Times reporter was also assaulted by Israeli forces.
- Israeli forces opened fire on Palestinians waiting to cross into northern Gaza in al-Rasheed Street, killing one person and injuring three others. The IDF said that it fired warning shots towards several threats in Gaza in the last day and was unaware of hitting suspects.
- President Trump instructed the US military to release a pause imposed by his predecessor Joe Biden on the supply of 2,000-pound (900kg) bombs to Israel.
- A two-year-old Palestinian girl died after being shot in the head during an Israeli raid in Jenin while her pregnant mother was slightly wounded. The IDF said that it used pressure cooker procedure by opening fire on a building containing Palestinian militants based on intelligence and was investigating the killing.
- A 17-year-old Palestinian teenager was injured by a rubber-coated bullet fired by Israeli forces during a raid on the house of Akram Badawi in Hebron who was released as part of hostages-prisoners agreement.
- Several Lebanese suspected of collaboration with Israel were arrested by Lebanese authorities.
- NNA reported bombings and explosions in Kfar Kila and Meiss el-Jabal.

=== 26 January ===
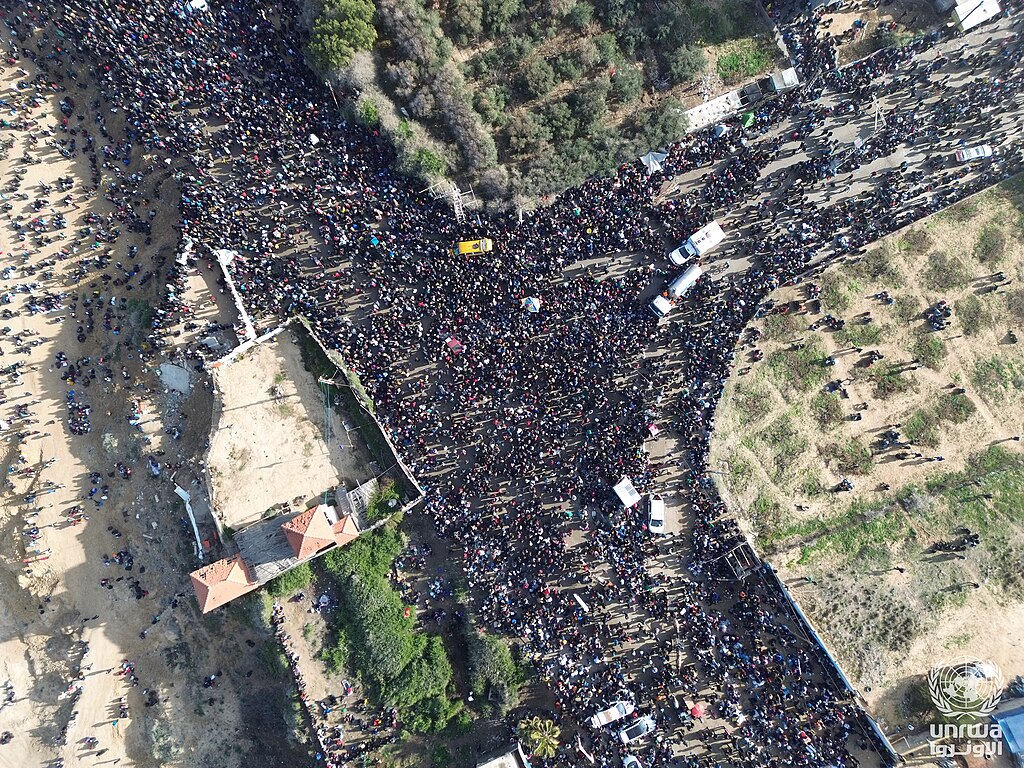
People waiting on the ar-Rashid road along the coast near Nuseirat on 26 January during the January 2025 Gaza war ceasefire

- The Gaza Health Ministry reported that hospitals in Gaza received 23 bodies of people killed in Israeli attacks in the past 72 hours, increasing its count of the Palestinian death toll in Gaza to 47,306.
- Netanyahu said that Hamas committed another breach of the truce deal one day prior by not submitting the list detailing the condition of the hostages who will be released in the first phase of the agreement, which is the second reason for the decision not to approve the return of Gazans to north Gaza.
- Twenty-four people including twelve children were killed while 134 others were injured by Israeli forces who opened fire after they tried to return to villages, towns and cities in south Lebanon. The IDF accused Hezbollah of sending "rioters" to southern Lebanon. An IDF official said that Hezbollah operatives were among those attempted to return to villages, towns and cities in southern Lebanon. Lebanese media reported that Israeli soldiers arrested two Lebanese men in Houla. The IDF said that it operated to "remove the threat" as a vehicle with Hezbollah flags approached an area where its soldiers were stationed.
- The Lebanese Army said that Israeli gunfire killed a Lebanese soldier in Marwahin-Dhayra road in the Tyre District and injured another soldier in Mais al-Jabal. Additionally, Israeli soldiers opened fire on a Lebanese army vehicle in Deir Mimas and lightly injured a female Lebanese soldier.
- In a phone call, French President Macron told Israeli PM Netanyahu to "withdraw his forces still present in Lebanon".
- The deadline for Israeli withdrawal from Lebanon passed, but Israeli forces nevertheless remained in Lebanon.
- SANA reported that Syrian authorities seized an arms shipment for Hezbollah after intercepting smuggling routes on the Lebanon-Syria border in Serghaya.
- Israeli gunfire on Palestinians who tried to go to north Gaza killed two people and injured nine others, including a child.
- The Palestinian Red Crescent Society (PRCS) said that Israeli snipers killed one person and injured four others in the vicinity of the Wadi Gaza Bridge.
- The IDF said that it destroyed a bomb-making lab in Jenin.
- The al-Quds Brigades said that it targeted an IDF vehicle by detonating an explosive device in Jenin.
- The IDF said that it killed a member of a PIJ rocket unit who "posed a threat" and fired warning shots at several groups consisting of dozens of suspects who approached soldiers.
- Netanyahu's office confirmed reaching an agreement with Hamas for the release of civilian hostage Arbel Yehud, soldier hostage Agam Berger and a third unnamed hostage on 30 January, adding that it received a document from Hamas regarding a total number of hostages who are still alive. It also said that in return, the IDF will allow the passage of Gazans to northern Gaza starting the next day.
- A 16-year-old Palestinian teenager was shot and killed by an Israeli soldier north of Jerusalem.

=== 27 January ===
- The Gaza Health Ministry reported that hospitals in Gaza received 11 bodies of people killed in Israeli attacks in the past 24 hours, increasing its count of the Palestinian death toll in Gaza to 47,317.
- After midnight (Israel and Lebanon time), the United States issued a statement saying that the ceasefire arrangement between Israel and Lebanon will continue to be in effect until 18 February. Lebanese caretaker Prime Minister Najib Mikati, and Israel's defense minister Israel Katz, confirmed that their countries will continue adhering to the ceasefire until 18 February.
- Palestinian media outlets reported the beginning of IDF pullout from western area of Netzarim Corridor.
- The IDF allowed Palestinians to return to north Gaza starting at 7.00 a.m. UTC+02:00.
- The Lebanese, Israeli and US governments agreed to start negotiations to release Lebanese citizens held in Israeli jails.
- Senior Hamas official Mousa Abu Marzook said that Hamas is not necessarily seeking to administer post-war Gaza and is willing to negotiate with US on its governance.
- Israeli police said that it arrested two IDF reservists in collaboration with Shin Bet, including one from an Iron Dome unit, on suspicion of spying for Iran.
- The Times reported that sensitive intelligence was leaked to Hezbollah by a senior Lebanese army official.
- The Lebanese Health Ministry said that an Israeli fire killed two people, including a child and a paramedic and injured 17 others during protests against Israeli presence in south Lebanon.
- Wafa reported that Israeli forces arrested approximately 20 Palestinians, including four children in Beit Ummar, and vandalised dozens of houses belonging to Palestinians during raids. It also said that Israeli forces detained seven Palestinians, including a female university student, from Beit Awwa.
- Hamas confirmed the death of two members of the al-Qassam brigades, including a commander in an IDF drone strike in the vicinity of Tulkarm. The IDF said that one of them was the local head of Hamas who was involved in numerous attacks against Israelis, including a gun attack on a car in July 2024 that injured three people.
- The IDF condemned video of a male soldier who was filmed wearing underwear of a woman during raid on her house in Bethlehem.
- Israel said that a Hamas list showed that eight of the 26 hostages still to be released in first stage of Gaza truce had died.
- European Union foreign policy chief Kaja Kallas said EU foreign ministers agreed to revive the European Union Border Assistance Mission to Rafah.
- The Lebanese Army deployed units to Marjayoun and other border areas in the southern Litani region after the IDF withdrawal.
- A 15-year-old Palestinian teenager was injured by Israeli gunfire in the vicinity of Cinema Roundabout in Jenin.
- The al-Quds brigades said that its Tulkarm Brigade injured Israeli soldiers by detonating an explosive on an IDF D9 bulldozer in Tulkarm.
- Wafa reported that Israeli snipers attacked an electricity transformer in the western neighbourhood of Tulkarm, causing blackouts in various parts of the city and Tulkarm Camp. It also reported that Israeli forces turned several residents' houses into IDF outposts and sniper positions after forcing dozens of families to evacuate the buildings and fired live ammunition towards any moving object.
- Israeli forces shelled a horse cart in the west of Nuseirat refugee camp, killing a child and injuring three others. The IDF said that it operated against several threats and violations of the truce deal in Gaza, including using a drone that fired a warning shot at a vehicle attempting to evade security checks which tried to pass through a restricted area.
- The IDF said that it killed more than 15 Palestinian militants and arrested 40 wanted people during its major raid in Jenin. It also said that it seized dozens of arms, located and dismantled dozens of explosive devices and located an observation command centre containing gas canisters used for manufacturing explosive devices.

=== 28 January ===
- The Gaza Health Ministry reported that hospitals in Gaza received 48 bodies of people killed in Israeli attacks in the past 48 hours, increasing its count of the Palestinian death toll in Gaza to 47,354.
- An Israeli attack on a bulldozer which tried to remove a vehicle stuck in Nuseirat killed a Palestinian man and wounded several others.
- Defense for Children International said that number of Palestinian children held by Israeli jails in administrative detention was at an "all time high".
- At least two people died due to exhaustion and dehydration during their return to north Gaza.
- The Tulkarem Brigades said that it inflicted casualties on Israeli forces in an ambush along with the al-Qassam Brigades and the Youth of Revenge and Liberation in Tulkarm Camp.
- The Quds News Network reported that Israeli forces abused Palestinian detainees while field interrogating them in Beit Duqqu and Biddu.
- The IDF again warned Lebanese civilians against returning to villages near the Israeli border.
- Wafa reported that Israeli forces demolished a mosque during their raid in Jenin refugee camp.
- The PRCS said one of its ambulances was hit by Israeli gunfire in Tal as-Sultan.
- Lebanese media reported an Israeli airstrike in Nabatieh al-Fawqa that injured 20 people. The IDF said that it struck a truck and other vehicles used by Hezbollah to transport arms. Another Israeli strike in Zawtar injured four people.
- The IDF said that an Israeli contractor was mistakenly killed by an Israeli soldier in Gaza.
- Israeli gunfire wounded two Palestinians, including a female journalist in Tulkarm.
- An Israeli strike on a convoy of displaced residents returning to border towns in southern Lebanon in Yaroun wounded one soldier and injured three civilians.
- Jordan established the largest air bridge since the beginning of Gaza war for bringing urgent medical supplies to Gaza under an agreement with US sponsorship.
- The IDF said that it opened fire on several "threats" in Gaza.
- A 10-year-old Palestinian boy was shot and seriously wounded by an Israeli soldier in Tulkarm.

=== 29 January ===
- The Gaza Health Ministry reported that hospitals in Gaza received 63 bodies of people killed in Israeli attacks in the past 24 hours, increasing its count of the Palestinian death toll in Gaza to 47,417.
- Hamas confirmed the death of between 6,000 and 7,000 members from its military and civilian wings until August 2024.
- Wafa reported that Israeli forces destroyed civilian infrastructure in Tulkarm camp.
- Officials said that Turkey and Qatar agreed to host Palestinian murder convicts who were released as part of the ceasefire agreement.
- Wafa reported that Israeli forces demolished several buildings including a prayer hall in the West Bank.
- The IDF said that it killed approximately 18 militants and more than 60 wanted Palestinians during its ongoing operation in Jenin and Tulkarem. It also said that it neutralized more than 100 explosive devices in Jenin and seized several other firearms, while another 30 bombs were neutralized and several firearms were recovered in Tulkarem.
- Israeli police and Shin Bet arrested 12 Palestinians from East Jerusalem whom they accused of violating a ban on "expressions of joy" and "identification with Hamas" for prisoners who was released as part of the ceasefire agreement.
- Prisoners' groups announced the death of two Palestinian detainees from Gaza in Israeli jails without any chronic diseases before their detention.
- Israeli soldiers demolished the house of a Palestinian militant who participated in a gun attack in November 2023 which killed an off-duty IDF reservist in the vicinity of Beit Lid.
- An Israeli strikes in Lebanon wounded eight people.
- The Turkish foreign ministry said that three Turkish citizens were killed in an Israeli airstrike while trying to cross illegally from Lebanon to Israel.
- The IDF said that it conducted a drone strike targeting a group of militants in Tammun. At least 10 people including two militants involved in the detonation of a bomb which killed an IDF reservist and wounded several others in Tammun on January 20 were killed in the strike. Hamas confirmed the death of five of its members. Defence for Children International said that a 17-year-old teenager was among those killed in the strike.
- US president Donald Trump said that his administration halted condom shipments from US to Gaza which was used by Hamas to make bombs. Available evidence suggested that the claim is almost certainly untrue. Later US Department of Government Efficiency chief Elon Musk said that he was not correct and it was sent to Gaza Province in Mozambique.
- President Trump signed an executive order cancelling student visas of foreign pro-Palestinian protesters whom he accused of sympathising with Hamas.

=== 30 January ===
- Clashes erupted between Israeli forces and Palestinian fighters in Qaffin.
- The IDF said that it conducted an airstrike on an engineering equipment used by Hezbollah to rebuild its militant infrastructure in southern Lebanon in violation of the truce agreement.
- The PIJ, accompanied with Hamas, the Popular Resistance Committee, and the Palestinian Mujahideen Movement released IDF hostage Agam Berger, civilian hostages Arbel Yehud and 80 year old Gadi Mozes and five Thai civilian hostages: Pongsak Thenna, Sathian Suwannakham, Watchara Sriaoun, Bannawat Seathao, and Surasak Lamnau.
- The IDF announced that it killed Hamas militant Muhammad Abu Aseed who kidnapped Namaa Levy during the 7 October attacks in a drone strike approximately four months prior.
- The IDF said that the IAF intercepted a Hezbollah surveillance drone launched towards Israel, which the IDF said violated the ceasefire deal.
- The Israeli government delayed the release of Palestinian prisoners until the safety of future releases can be guaranteed in response to the chaotic scenes during the handover of several hostages in Khan Yunis. Later, Netanyahu's office said that mediators have assured the safety of future release of hostages.
- Israel's UNRWA ban went into effect.
- The Jenin Brigades said it had inflicted casualties on Israeli forces by detonating an explosive device on an IDF vehicle in Jenin.
- Israeli police said that its Yamam unit killed Palestinian militant Qasim Aklik in Nablus whom it accused of planning and conducting attacks against Israeli targets.
- 110 Palestinian prisoners were released by Israel, of which 23 were transferred to Egypt prior to further deportation.
- Hamas confirmed the death of top al-Qassam Brigades commander Mohammed Deif and other al-Qassam Brigades commanders including Ghazi Abu Tamaa, the commander of weapons and combat services, Raed Thabet, commander of manpower and head of supplies unit, and Rafa Salama, the commander of the Khan Younis Brigade.
- The IDF announced that one soldier was killed and five others from the Kfir Brigade's Haruv reconnaissance unit were injured during a gun battle with Palestinian militants in Jenin refugee camp.
- The IDF said that it killed Haytham Hazem Hijazi Rajab, a Hamas Nukhba force member in Shuja'iyya Battalion who participated in the Nahal Oz attack during the 7 October attacks and was involved in several additional attacks on soldiers in Gaza.
- Clashes erupted in Kobar. A 13-year-old was arrested by Israeli forces.
- The Palestinian Health Ministry said that Israeli fire killed two Palestinian men in Jenin. The IDF said that it killed two militants throwing firebombs at a West Bank Highway.

=== 31 January ===
- An Israeli strike in Jenin refugee camp injured three women. The Tulkarm Brigades said it had inflicted casualties on Israeli forces during clashes in a southern neighbourhood of Tulkarm. The Quds News Network reported that Israeli forces besieged Thabet Thabet Governmental Hospital in Tulkarm.
- IDF fighter jets conducted overnight strikes on underground weapons manufacturing and arms smuggling sites in the Beqaa Valley, killing two people and injuring ten others.
- The Jenin Brigades said that it inflicted casualties on Israeli forces by detonating explosive devices on IDF vehicles in Al-Yamun.
- The IDF said that it killed two Palestinian militants who killed one Israeli soldier and injured five other soldiers one day prior.
- The Wall Street Journal reported that Israel told the Lebanon ceasefire committee that Iran is funding Hezbollah by "smuggling" cash through Beirut airport. Hezbollah denied the claim.
- Israeli gunboats fatally shot a Palestinian fisherman in coastal waters in the vicinity of Nuseirat refugee camp.
- Hamas announced that French-Israeli civilian hostage Ofer Kalderon, American-Israeli civilian hostage Keith Siegel and Israeli-Argentine civilian hostage Yarden Bibas were to be released the next day.
- EU foreign policy chief Kaja Kallas said that the bloc restarted its Rafah Border Crossing mission.
- Israeli forces opened fire on a group of people in Al-Mughayyir, injuring two children.
- Israeli settlers set fire to olive groves in land owned by a Palestinian in Burin.
- The IDF said that it launched an interceptor missile towards a "suspicious aerial target" above Zar'it.
- A coalition was formed by nine nations for upholding international law and Palestinian rights.
- Released British-Israeli hostage Emily Damari's mother said that Emily was held in UNRWA facilities. The UNRWA said that these are grave allegations and demanded a probe.

== February ==
=== 1 February ===
- The Gaza Health Ministry reported that hospitals in Gaza received 27 bodies of people killed in Israeli attacks in the past 24 hours, increasing its count of the Palestinian death toll in Gaza to 47,487.
- Wafa reported that Israeli forces fired on civilians in a car on Halhul-Hebron Bridge north of Hebron and arrested its occupants.
- Palestinian militants attacked Israeli forces in Nablus and the Balata camp.
- Wafa reported that Israeli forces forced Tulkarm residents to evacuate houses.
- Hostages Keith Siegel, Ofer Kalderon and Yarden Bibas were released by Hamas.
- The Rafah border crossing was reopened.
- 183 Palestinian prisoners were released by Israel, of which seven were transferred to Egypt prior to their deportation.
- An Israeli drone strike in Jenin killed five people including a teenager and injured two others. The IDF said that it struck militants.
- Two Palestinian journalists were detained by Israeli forces in Beit Ummar.
- The IDF said that it conducted a drone strike targeting a car carrying militants in Qabatiya, killing two people including a prisoner released during the 2023 Gaza war ceasefire. The IDF said that the militants were on their way to carry out an attack. It also said that it carried out another strike in Jenin, targeting a group of militants.
- The al-Quds Brigades said that it in collaboration with al-Qassam Brigades and the Youth of Revenge and Liberation opened fire on an infantry unit of 10 Israeli soldiers in Jenin.

=== 2 February ===
- Israeli settlers under the protection of Israeli forces attacked Palestinian shepherds grazing their flocks in Ein Faris in the vicinity of Nahalin, injuring at least one person. Clashes also erupted between residents and Israeli forces, who detained two Palestinians.
- A mosque in al-Melihat, north of Jericho was set on fire by Israeli settlers.
- The al-Quds Brigades said that it inflicted casualties on Israeli forces during clashes in Tubas.
- The IDF said that it expanded its operation in Tulkarm to Tammun and seized several firearms from the area.
- An elderly man was killed by Israeli fire in Jenin refugee camp.
- Lebanese media reported that a fisherman was detained by the Israeli Navy off the coast of Naqoura. It also said that Israeli forces opened fire on civilians trying to return to Yaroun and opened fire on protesters in Kfar Kila. The IDF warned against returning until further notice.
- An Israeli drone strike on a vehicle on a section of coastal road restricted as per the ceasefire agreement in the vicinity of Nuseirat, injured at least four Palestinians including a young boy.
- The IDF said that it demolished several buildings used by militants in Jenin, damaging parts of the Jenin Government Hospital.
- The IDF said that it killed over 50 militants since the beginning of its operation in the north of the West Bank.

=== 3 February ===
- The Gaza Government Information Office said that more than 14,000 people are missing and presumed dead due to Israeli attacks, increasing its count of the Palestinian death toll in Gaza to 61,709.
- A local official said that Israeli strikes forced approximately 75 percentage of Palestinians to evacuate from Tulkarm refugee camp.
- The Palestinian Authority urged US intervention to stop Israeli "aggression" in the West Bank.
- Médecins Sans Frontières said that Israeli raids in Jenin lead to shortage of key supplies.
- Israeli human rights organization B'Tselem published a footage appearing to show an Israeli settler attack in Susya.

=== 4 February ===
- The Palestinian Ministry of Foreign Affairs accused Israeli forces of forcing civilians to evacuate from their houses under armed threats and blowing up entire neighbourhoods in the northern West Bank.
- A Palestinian militant opened fire at an IDF checkpoint in the vicinity of Tayasir, killing two IDF reservists and injuring eight Israeli soldiers, before he was killed by soldiers.
- Palestinian media reported an Israeli drone strike in Tammun.
- NNA reported that Israeli forces conducted a large-scale demolition operation in southern Lebanon.
- The Lebanese Army said that it was deployed in Taybeh.
- The IDF said that it shot a suspect who refused to withdraw after firing warning shots in central Gaza. It also said that it fired warning shots at Gazans violating the truce in several incidents.
- President Trump signed an order to continue the US funding halt for UNRWA.
- President Trump suggested that US could "take over" Gaza.

=== 5 February ===
- The Gaza Health Ministry reported that hospitals in Gaza received 12 bodies of people killed in Israeli attacks in the past 24 hours, increasing its count of the Palestinian death toll in Gaza to 47,552.
- Israeli forces arrested at least 30 Palestinians, including a child from the West Bank.
- Wafa reported that Israeli shooting killed a Palestinian civilian in eastern Khan Yunis.
- The Hind Rajab Foundation said that Switzerland opened a probe against an Israeli soldier for alleged war crimes in Gaza who is currently on Swiss territory based on a complaint filed by it.
- Police and Shin Bet accused an Israeli man of a ramming attack in the vicinity of Qabatiya which wounded a guard.
- Israeli forces killed at least four Palestinians, including a child in Rafah. The IDF said that they were "imminent threats" to its soldiers.

=== 6 February ===
- The Gaza Health Ministry reported that 31 deaths were recorded from Israeli attacks in the past 24 hours, increasing its count of the Palestinian death toll in Gaza to 47,583.
- Al Jazeera Arabic reported a "catastrophic" humanitarian situation in Tammun due to the Israeli siege.
- One person from a Palestinian family was killed and several others were injured due to the collapse of the wall of a building due to strong winds in Sheikh Radwan.
- Al Jazeera Arabic reported that residents of Far'a were facing food and water shortages and were unable to get ambulances due to the Israeli siege.
- Israeli Defense Minister Israel Katz ordered the IDF to prepare a plan allowing Gazans to voluntarily leave the Strip. He also mentioned re-locating Palestinians to Canada and Europe, specifically mentioning countries such as Spain, Ireland, Norway and others that have levelled "false accusations" against Israel's war in Gaza.
- Two Israeli soldiers were killed and eight soldiers were injured, one of them critically in Gaza. An initial IDF probe said a crane collapsed on them because of strong winds.
- Al Jazeera reported that a winter storm damaged several tents of displaced Palestinians in north Gaza.
- An IDF court sentenced a reservist who served as a guard at Sde Teiman detention camp to seven months in prison for abusing Palestinian detainees.
- The Israeli State Attorney's Office charged an Israeli settler with terror offenses for allegedly carrying out a gun attack against a Palestinian family in the northern West Bank which injured two people.
- The Shin Bet said that it thwarted a bus bombing in Jerusalem in late 2024.
- 26,000 Palestinians were displaced since the start of the Israeli raid in the northern West Bank.
- Wafa reported that a Palestinian man was shot and killed by Israeli forces in al-Maghraqa.
- Gaza Civil Defense said that Israel is not allowing mobile homes or heavy equipment according to the humanitarian protocol laid out in the truce deal. The Gaza Government Media Office said that Hamas is unable to return the bodies of Israeli hostages killed during bombardments without heavy equipment.
- The IDF said that it destroyed a bomb-manufacturing lab and several explosive devices during a raid in the northern West Bank.
- Italian foreign minister Antonio Tajani said that Italy will stop working with UNRWA after the mother of a freed hostage said that her daughter had been held at UNRWA facilities in Gaza.
- President Trump imposed sanctions on the International Criminal Court for its arrest warrants for Israeli Prime Minister Benjamin Netanyahu and former Israeli Defence Minister Yoav Gallant for alleged war crimes and crimes against humanity in the Gaza war and for investigating alleged US war crimes in Afghanistan after sanctions were removed by his predecessor Joe Biden.
- The IDF struck Hezbollah weapon storage sites in Nabatieh and the Beqaa Valley.

=== 7 February ===
- The Jenin Brigades said it had inflicted casualties on Israeli forces by detonating an explosive device in the vicinity of an IDF vehicle during clashes near Jenin.
- Lebanese media outlets reported an Israeli airstrike in the vicinity of Tebna, south of Sidon. NNA reported an Israeli air strike in Al-Bazouriyah and another strike in Kfar Kila. The IDF said that it targeted two Hezbollah military sites which violated the truce deal.
- The Gaza Government Media Office said that aid to Gaza is far below the minimum required under the truce deal.
- A child was killed by unexploded ordnance in Rafah.
- The IDF said that soldiers were deployed to several points in Gaza as part of the ceasefire agreement to strengthen defenses of Western Negev communities.
- Wafa reported that the IDF raided Qaffin, seized houses and converted them into outposts.
- Hamas announced that it will release Israeli civilian hostages Eli Sharabi, Ohad Ben Ami and Or Levy the next day.
- The Palestinian Ministry of Education called on the UN to safeguard schools in the West Bank from Israeli raids.
- A 10-year-old Palestinian child died from injuries sustained from Israeli fire in Tulkarm Camp.
- A Hezbollah field commander and his two daughters were killed when their home exploded in Tayr Harfa. The IDF reported that the explosion was caused by a Hezbollah bomb intended for an attack. Lebanese media outlets said that they were killed by leftover Israeli munitions.
- Former Israeli Defense Minister Yoav Gallant acknowledged that the IDF implemented the Hannibal Directive during the 7 October attacks.
- The Trump administration approved approximately $7.4 billion in weapons sales to Israel despite opposition from Congress.

=== 8 February ===
- The Gaza Health Ministry reported that 572 more fatalities were confirmed from Israeli attacks in Gaza, increasing its count of the Palestinian death toll in Gaza to 48,181.
- Palestinian media outlets reported that Palestinian militants attacked a residential building containing Israeli forces in the vicinity of Tulkarm camp, while Israeli settlers backed by soldiers attacked a group of Palestinian farmers in Husan and arrested one person.
- President Trump ordered cuts in US financial assistance to South Africa, citing its genocide case against Israel among other reasons.
- The Palestinian Prisoners' Media Office said that Israeli forces beat the 70-year-old father of a prisoner set for release in Kobar.
- Israeli hostages Eli Sharabi, Ohad Ben Ami and Or Levy were released by Hamas. Hamas forced the hostages to speak in the handover ceremony.
- Israel released 183 Palestinian prisoners, of which seven were transferred to Egypt prior to their deportation.
- The IDF said that it struck a Hamas weapons depot in the vicinity of Deir Ali, Syria.
- NNA reported that six people were killed and two others were injured in an Israeli airstrike in the Beqaa Valley. The IDF said that it targeted Hezbollah militants operating at a strategic arms manufacturing and storing site.
- Hospitals said that the two Israeli hostages released earlier were in "poor" medical condition, while the third hostage was in a "severe nutritional state". Seven Palestinian prisoners released by Israel were also admitted to hospital due to poor health.
- The Palestinian Authority called for a "firm" international response to force Israeli forces to stop attacks in the West Bank.

=== 9 February ===
- The Gaza Health Ministry reported that at least eight bodies of people killed in Israeli attacks arrived at hospitals in Gaza, increasing its count of the Palestinian death toll in Gaza to 48,189.
- The IDF started withdrawing from the Netzarim Corridor as part of the ceasefire agreement with Hamas.
- The IDF said that it expanded its offensive in the northern West Bank to Nur Shams, shooting several militants and detaining suspects. Two Palestinian women including an eight-months pregnant Palestinian woman, Sundus Shalabi, was killed along with her fetus, while her husband was seriously wounded. Hamas' brigades said they had foiled the incursion, and to have inflicted casualties on Israeli soldiers there.
- Quds news network reported that Israeli settlers backed by Israeli forces blocked the main street of Huwara, dancing and waving their flag.
- The IDF said that it fired warning shots on a group of Palestinians who approached the north Gaza border in the vicinity of Nahal Oz, hitting several of them and forcing their withdrawal. IDF soldiers killed three people east of Gaza City after dozens approached the border. A Palestinian woman was killed in Al-Qarara.
- Clashes were reported between Palestinian youths and Israeli forces in Deir Jarir.
- The IDF said that it fired warning shots towards Palestinian suspects who approached soldiers and "posed a threat" in several areas in Gaza. It also said that the Israeli Navy spotted a Palestinian vessel which exceeded a maritime boundary and forced it back to the Gazan coast after firing warning shots.
- Lebanese media reported Israeli airstrikes in the vicinity of Houmine, Aazze and Kafroue villages in Nabatieh Governorate. The IDF said that it struck a tunnel between Lebanon and Syria used for smuggling weapons by Hezbollah and other Hezbollah targets including arms and rocket launchers that "posed an immediate threat" to Israel.
- Israeli Police confiscated books, including children's coloring book titled "From the river to the sea", and arrested the owner of two bookstores focusing on Palestinian identity and his nephew in East Jerusalem under a court-granted search warrant.

=== 10 February ===
- The Gaza Health Ministry reported that at least 19 bodies of people killed in Israeli attacks arrived at hospitals in Gaza, increasing its count of the Palestinian death toll in Gaza to 48,208.
- At least 35,000 Palestinians were displaced due to Israeli raids in the West Bank. The IDF said that was targeting armed Palestinian militants.
- The Jenin Brigades said that it damaged an IDF vehicle in Silat al-Harithiya by detonating an explosive device.
- The Netanyahu government delayed the formation of a state commission of inquiry into the 7 October attacks for three months.
- A Palestinian was shot and killed by Israeli forces in Shuja'iyya.
- A building collapse caused the death of three people in Gaza.
- The IDF warned Gazans against approaching its soldiers and entering prohibited areas.
- The Lebanese Army said that it completed its deployment in Rab Thalathin, Talloussah and Bani Haiyyan after the IDF's withdrawal.
- Clashes were reported between Palestinian militants and Israeli forces in Nur Shams.
- Israeli forces demolished five homes in Khallet Athaba, south of Hebron.
- The Palestinian Authority signed an $80 million agreement to assess damage, remove rubble and establish temporary shelters in Gaza.
- The IDF said that it arrested a prominent Hamas militant in Jenin who planned to conduct attacks.
- Hamas said that it will delay the hostage release planned on 16 February until Israel "complies with past obligations", citing its agreement "violations". Israeli Defense Minister Israel Katz ordered the IDF in Gaza to prepare at "highest level of alert". The Hostages and Missing Families Forum said that it reached out to mediating nations to save the agreement. Later, Hamas said that it will still release hostages on 16 February if Israel "implements obligations" under Gaza ceasefire.
- Palestinian Authority President Mahmoud Abbas signed a decree ending stipends for Palestinian prisoners based on the length of their sentence and to the families of militants killed while conducting attacks.

=== 11 February ===
- The Gaza Health Ministry reported that at least 11 bodies of people killed in Israeli attacks arrived at hospitals in Gaza, increasing its count of the Palestinian death toll in Gaza to 48,219.
- Israeli forces raided Jenin, triggering clashes with Palestinian militants. The al-Qassam Brigades said that it clashed with Israeli forces in Tulkarm Camp and Nur Shams.
- Israeli forces demolished 11 houses in Masafer Yatta.
- Kibbutz Kissufim and the IDF said that elderly Israeli hostage Shlomo Mantzur was killed during the 7 October attacks while his remains were being held by Hamas.
- The Gaza Health Ministry said that Israeli authorities were only allowing medical evacuation of far fewer than the 150 people required as part of the truce deal.
- Al Jazeera reported that Israeli forces shot and killed a Palestinian man and critically injured another person in Saudi and Tal as-Sultan areas of Rafah.
- Israeli settlers started paving a dirt road in Yasuf.
- The Gaza Interior Ministry said that police arrested five people suspected of attacking aid trucks.
- Israeli forces blew up the house of a PIJ militant in Jenin whom they killed in July 2024 for his involvement in the killing of an Israeli soldier and injuring 16 other soldiers.
- Israeli Prime Minister Benjamin Netanyahu said that the IDF will return to "intense fighting" unless Hamas free hostages by noon on 15 February. Israeli Defense Minister Israel Katz also said that war will be different in its intensity compared to prior the truce unless Hamas released hostages. Hamas said that it is committed to the truce and hostage release agreement and reiterated that it holds Israel accountable for any "complications or delays" to the execution of the agreement.

=== 12 February ===
- The Gaza Health Ministry reported that at least one person was killed in Israeli attacks and two bodies were recovered from rubble in the past 24 hours, increasing its count of the Palestinian death toll in Gaza to 48,222.
- The Palestinian Ministry of Foreign Affairs called on the United Nations Security Council to take action on what it said as Israeli "crimes" in the West Bank.
- An Israeli drone strike in ash-Shawka municipality, east of Rafah killed at least one Palestinian and injured another. The IDF said that it targeted two suspects who picked up a drone flown from Israel.
- The United Nations Office for the Coordination of Humanitarian Affairs said that more than 2,300 children in Gaza were treated for acute malnutrition in January.
- Clashes were reported between Israeli forces and Palestinian militants during Israeli raids in Nur Shams and Arroub refugee camps. The IDF said that its Maglan commando unit killed a Palestinian militant and seized his weapon in the Nur Shams refugee camp during a firefight in which one Maglan soldier was moderately injured. The al-Quds Brigades said that it, along with other militant groups, inflicted injuries among an IDF infantry group following an ambush in al-Manshiya neighbourhood of Nur Shams refugee camp.
- NNA reported that Israeli forces burned several houses and a farm in Al-Aadaissah, stating that it was a violation of the truce.
- The IDF said that Iran's Quds Force attempted to smuggle money to Hezbollah through Beirut–Rafic Hariri International Airport using civilian flights and estimated that some of the money transfers were conducted successfully despite regularly updating the US-led committee supervising the truce with relevant information to thwart them. Later, the Lebanese Broadcasting Corporation International reported that Lebanese aviation authorities informed two Mahan Air flights that it will not be able to land in Lebanon. It also reported that Iran Air was also not allowed to land in Lebanon. The Iranian foreign ministry accused Israel of disrupting normal flights to Beirut airport. Iran said that Lebanese flights will not be able to land in Iran.

=== 13 February ===
- The Gaza Health Ministry reported that at least three people were killed in Israeli attacks while 14 other recovered bodies arrived in hospitals in Gaza in the past 24 hours, increasing its count of the Palestinian death toll in Gaza to 48,239.
- The al-Qassam Brigades and other Palestinian militant groups said that they clashed with Israeli soldiers including via ambushes, in the Nur Shams and Tulkarm refugee camps. It also said that a Palestinian fighter died as a result of clashes. Fighting was also ongoing in the Jenin refugee camp.
- Palestinian human rights group Al-Haq said that Israeli operation in Jenin is causing "lasting mental harm" to Palestinians in the area.
- The International Federation for Human Rights said that 44,000 Palestinians were displaced by the Israeli offensive in the West Bank.
- Palestinian media reported an Israeli strike on a vehicle in Jenin.
- An Israeli strike was reported in the vicinity of the Gaza security fence in Al-Fukhari.
- Wafa reported that a Palestinian woman was arrested by Israeli forces in Asira ash-Shamaliya.
- The Israeli State Attorney's Tel Aviv District Office filed a declaration of intent to prosecute a man from East Jerusalem who drove a militant who critically wounded one man in Tel Aviv in a vehicle disguised with a hostage symbol.
- The IDF said that it shot and "neutralized" a Palestinian who suspiciously approached soldiers in an IDF base in the vicinity of Nablus.
- Hezbollah-owned Al-Manar media outlet reported that Israeli forces set fire to more houses and properties in Odaisseh.
- Israeli security forces said that they thwarted attacks planned by two Israelis.
- The IDF said that it killed more than 60 Palestinian militants and detained more than 210 militants since the start of its offensive in the West Bank.
- Hamas announced that it will free hostages as planned, saying that Egyptian and Qatari mediators confirmed that they would follow up to remove obstacles in implementing the humanitarian provisions of the ceasefire deal.
- The IDF said that the Egoz Unit destroyed a vehicle containing explosives in Jenin.
- Wafa reported that a group of Israeli settlers kidnapped a Palestinian man from Al-Awsaj, north of Jericho and took him to an unknown location. Israeli forces arrested a Palestinian man who was herding sheep in Al-Jiftlik and detained a high school student returning from Jordan at the Karameh crosing.
- The IDF said that a rocket was launched from Gaza but landed inside Gaza. Palestinian media reported that the rocket struck Nuseirat and killed a 14-year-old boy. Later, IDF said that its airstrike in central Gaza struck the launcher used to fire the projectile. Palestinian media stated the explosion was accidentally caused by explosives disposal engineers trying to dismantle an unexploded Israeli rocket.
- Israeli snipers shot dead a Palestinian man in Bureij refugee camp. A child died due to explosion of an unexploded ordnance left behind by Israeli forces in Nuseirat refugee camp.
- The IDF said that it carried out airstrikes on Hezbollah facilities that stored weapons and rocket launchers.
- Speaker of the Parliament of Lebanon Nabih Berri rejected an Israeli demand to keep troops stationed on five areas in southern Lebanon past the ceasefire deadline of 18 February. Israel accused Lebanon of not fulfilling its truce obligations.

=== 14 February ===
- Wafa reported that Israeli settlers let livestock to Palestinian-owned farmland to destroy wheat and barley crops in Masafer Yatta. It also reported that Israeli forces arrested a Palestinian man who tried to resist against actions of Israeli settlers in the area. The Al-Aqsa Martyrs Brigades said it had inflicted casualties on Israeli forces by detonating explosive devices during a raid in Askar Camp.
- Palestinian sources said that clashes broke out between young Palestinian residents and Israeli forces during an Israeli raid in Yatma.
- PIJ announced that it will release Israeli-Russian civilian hostage Alexander Trufanov, while Hamas announced that it will release Israeli-American civilian hostage Sagui Dekel-Chen and Israeli-Argentinean civilian hostage Iair Horn the next day.
- Israeli police said that it arrested three Palestinians from Taybeh who were suspected of participation in an attack on police officers during a wedding. It also said that it seized five pistols and an M16 rifle.
- Israel's Coordinator of Government Activities in the Territories reported that it facilitated the entry of 600 aid trucks into Gaza each day as stipulated in the ceasefire agreement. The Gaza Government Media Office said that Israel is delaying humanitarian aid.
- A Palestinian father said that his eight-year-old daughter lost eyesight after being shot by an Israeli sniper through a window at her house in Sa'ir.
- Wafa reported that Israeli fire injured two Palestinian fishermen in a fishing boat in waters near the Port of Gaza.
- Israeli settlers from Hilltop Youth attacked and wounded 16 Palestinians in Al-Maniya.
- Two people were wounded, including UNIFIL deputy force commander Chok Bahadur Dhakal, after Hezbollah supporters attacked the convoy of his commanding officer Aroldo Lázaro Sáenz outside Beirut–Rafic Hariri International Airport.

=== 15 February ===
- The Gaza Health Ministry reported that 25 deaths were recorded from Israeli attacks in the past 24 hours, increasing its count of the Palestinian death toll in Gaza to 48,264.
- The Jenin Brigades said that it targeted IDF vehicles in Silat al-Harithiya by detonating explosive devices.
- Palestinian Information Center reported that Israeli forces fired at the Khan Yunis beach area.
- Hostages Sagui Dekel-Chen, Alexandre Troufanov and Iair Horn were released by Hamas and PIJ. Israeli media outlet Ynet reported that the handover was a highly choreographed propaganda event, which included bringing the hostages to the venue in a vehicle stolen on 7 October, parading the hostages on stage along with militants with stolen IDF uniforms and Israeli weapons, and propaganda banners in broken Hebrew.
- Israeli police and Shin Bet said that they detained a Palestinian man from Jenin suspected of attacking an Israeli man.
- 369 Palestinian prisoners were released by Israel.
- Wafa reported that Palestinians were attacked by a group of Israeli settlers in Wadi al-Faw in the northern Jordan Valley.
- Wafa reported that Israeli forces struck a bulldozer attempting to remove rubble from destroyed Palestinian infrastructure in Al-Mughraqa, injuring two people.
- Lebanese authorities detained over 25 people in response to the 14 February attack on the UNIFIL convoy.
- NNA reported an Israeli drone strike in the outskirts of Ainata.
- The IDF said it conducted a warning drone strike after several vehicles attempted to travel to north Gaza through a route unapproved in the truce agreement.
- The PRCS said that a 14-year-old Palestinian child sustained a neck injury by shrapnel from a live bullet fired by Israeli forces southwest of Nablus.
- UNRWA said that a misinformation campaign was putting its employees at risk.
- Wafa reported that Israeli settlers under the protection of Israeli forces attacked houses and fired live ammunition in Jalud, leading to clashes with residents.
- Lebanese media reported that an Israeli drone struck a vehicle in the vicinity of Jarjouaa, killing two people and injuring five others including two children. The IDF said it targeted Abbas Ahmad Hamoud, a senior member of Hezbollah's aerial unit who "repeatedly violated" the ceasefire agreement. A strike caused the collapse of a building in Ain Qana, killing one person.
- Wafa reported that Israeli settlers threw stones towards residents in Surif, injuring a young Palestinian man. It also reported that Israeli settlers burned tents of Palestinian residents and attacked vehicles using stones in Al-Maniya and attacked residents of Umm Safa and shot at their houses.

=== 16 February ===
- The Gaza Health Ministry reported that seven deaths from Israeli attacks were recorded in the past 24 hours, increasing its count of the Palestinian death toll in Gaza to 48,271.
- Wafa reported that Israeli forces raided al-Issawiya, adjacent to Jerusalem, leading to clashes with residents.
- Clashes were reported between Palestinian militants and Israeli forces during raids in Al-Yamun, Tell, Qalqilya and Jalazone.
- The Gaza Interior Ministry said that an Israeli strike killed three members of the Hamas-run police force while securing aid supplies in Rafah. The IDF said that it struck several armed individuals after they approached Israeli forces.
- Jabalia municipality said that it faced a severe lack of clean water.
- Israeli Public Broadcasting Corporation reported that Prime Minister Benjamin Netanyahu didn't approve the entry of caravans and heavy equipment to Gaza, with a security consultation chaired by Netanyahu deciding that the issue of caravans will be discussed in the coming days.
- The IDF detained approximately 20 ultra-Orthodox Jewish Israelis who tried to reach a holy site cut through the border, and illegally entered Lebanon overnight.
- Israeli police said that prosecutors are preparing to indict a 14-year-old teenager from East Jerusalem for allegedly hurling stones at a police car.
- Wafa reported that Israeli forces seized houses in Tulkarm after forcibly displacing Palestinian residents.
- Palestinian media reported that an Israeli drone struck a car in central Gaza. The IDF said it conducted a warning drone strike after suspects in a vehicle attempted to drive to north Gaza through an unapproved route in violation of the truce.
- The media committee of Jenin refugee camp said that 25 Palestinian were killed and over 20,000 others were displaced since the beginning of the Israeli offensive in Jenin.
- The Gaza Health Ministry said that there is a severe shortage of oxygen in hospitals in Gaza.
- A woman was reportedly killed and several others were injured in Houla by Israeli gunfire. Three people were also detained. The IDF said that it fired warning shots at a group that gathered in the area.
- Israeli airstrikes were reported in Harbata and Halbata in Baalbek District. The IDF said it hit Hezbollah sites.
- The Israeli Nahal Brigade used in May an 80-year-old Palestinian man as a human shield for 8 hours in Gaza by tying an explosive cord around his neck and threatening to have his head blown off. The IDF said that the alleged event may be investigated pending additional testimony.
- Human Rights Watch said that 3,369 Palestinians were under administrative detention in Israeli jails.

=== 17 February ===
- Wafa reported that a Palestinian man died from injuries sustained in an Israeli strike four days prior in Rafah. It also reported that Israeli strikes continued in Rafah and Khan Yunis, with Israeli gunboats and ground forces firing machine guns at the shore and on Beit Hanoun.
- At night, an Israeli drone flew to Gaza with a broadcast sending threats of a "second and third Nakba" to the Gazan population.
- The Tulkarm Brigade said that it shot at and detonated explosives on Israeli forces in Qaffin.
- Wafa reported that groups of Israeli settlers attacked houses and properties belonging to Palestinians in Duma, Aqraba and Jurish.
- Lebanese media reported an Israeli incursion in Kfar Chouba after Lebanese army was deployed in the area. NNA reported that an Israeli drone dropped a hand grenade in the main square of the same area, which is in vicinity of a school.
- Wafa reported that two Palestinians died from injuries sustained in an Israeli strike two days ago.
- Peace Now said that Israel issued a tender to build 974 new settler housing units in the Israeli settlement of Efrat in the West Bank.
- Sky News Arabia reported that Hamas told mediating nations that it was willing to give administration of Gaza to the PA after Egyptian pressure.
- The IDF and Shin Bet conducted a drone strike on a car near Sidon that killed Muhammad Shaheen, Hamas's head of operations in Lebanon who allegedly directed rocket attacks against Israel and planned attacks on Israeli citizens.
- The IDF said that it destroyed a Radwan tunnel in Shebaa Farms that stored several weapons caches.
- The IDF confirmed that it will remain in five strategic points in southern Lebanon after the 18 February deadline to withdraw as part of the truce deal.
- Israeli foreign minister Gideon Sa'ar accused Turkey of collaborating with Iran to fund Hezbollah during a meeting with a US delegation.
- Israeli media revealed previously undisclosed four drone flights from Lebanon into Israel in the past weeks, being a violation by Hezbollah of the ceasefire agreement.
- The Lebanese Presidency announced the extended suspension of flights from Iran after a cabinet meeting.
- The IDF said that it conducted a warning drone strike after suspects in vehicles attempted to drive to northern Gaza through an unapproved route in violation of the truce.
- The PRCS said that one of its ambulance crew was attacked by Israeli forces while attempting to reach a person who need medical assistance.
- A 15-year-old Palestinian boy died from injuries sustained in an Israeli airstrike two weeks prior in Qabatiya.
- Israeli Defense Minister Israel Katz announced the establishment of a new directorate within the Israeli Defence Ministry for assisting Gazans to "voluntarily" emigrate from Gaza Strip to third countries.
- A Lebanese security official said that Israeli forces started to withdraw from border villages, including Mais al-Jabal and Blida, as the Lebanese army advanced.

=== 18 February ===
- The Gaza Health Ministry reported that one person was killed in Israeli attacks and six bodies were recovered in the past 24 hours, increasing its count of the Palestinian death toll in Gaza to 48,291.
- Palestinian media reported that Israeli forces clashed with Palestinians in Ya'bad and Beit Rita.
- The Netanyahu government ordered the immediate enforcement of the law banning UNRWA.
- Palestinian media reported that settlers set fire to several vehicles belonging to Palestinians in Susiya.
- NNA reported that Israeli forces withdrew from several towns and villages in south Lebanon except five points in the Israeli-Lebanese border. The Lebanese Army said that it deployed to the border after withdrawal of Israeli forces. Israeli Defense Minister Israel Katz said that IDF will "forcefully" enforce the truce agreement against violations by Hezbollah. The Lebanese government said that any remaining Israeli presence in Lebanon will be considered as an occupation. and demanded the full withdrawal of the IDF.
- Lebanese media reported that Israeli forces conducted a large controlled demolition in Kfar Shouba prior to its withdrawal from the area.
- Wafa reported that a tear gas canister fired by Israeli forces injured a 16-year-old boy.
- A senior Israeli official said that Israel is to begin allowing mobile houses and heavy equipment to Gaza to secure the release of six hostages and the bodies of four hostages as part of stage one of the hostage-ceasefire agreement.
- Wafa reported that Israeli forces issued demolition notifications for 14 houses belonging to Palestinians in Tulkarm Camp.
- Wafa reported that a woman was killed while three others were injured in an Israeli attack in ash-Shawka municipality of Rafah.
- Israeli foreign minister Gideon Sa'ar said that Israel will start negotiations on the second stage of truce in Gaza in this week.
- Hamas announced that it will release bodies of four hostages on 20 February and six living Israeli hostages on 22 February. Netanyahu's office said that Israel will also receive bodies of four other hostages next week.
- The Palestinian Information Centre reported that a child was killed by Israeli forces in the vicinity of al-Awda Square in Rafah. It also reported that another child was shot and wounded by Israeli forces east of Shuja'iyya.
- The IDF said that it in collaboration with border police and Shin Bet arrested 25 "wanted individuals suspected of involvement in terrorist activity" from the West Bank and confiscated weapons.
- Israeli forces demolished seven houses belonging to Palestinians in Kafr ad-Dik and Masafer Yatta, saying that they lacked construction permits.
- The IDF said that it fired shots as warnings towards Palestinian suspects who approached its soldiers in Gaza. It also said that it directly opened fire on a suspect who did not withdraw after warning in south Gaza.
- Channel 12 reported that two Israeli soldiers vacationing in Amsterdam who served in Gaza war returned to Israel due to arrest warrant concerns.
- Lebanese Civil Defense announced that it recovered 23 bodies from four towns on the Israel–Lebanon border following Israel's withdrawal.
- Israeli tanks opened fire in Rafah and killed two people. The IDF said that it opened fire in south Gaza on a person approaching them.

=== 19 February ===
- The Gaza Health Ministry reported that at least three people were killed in Israeli attacks and one person died from the injuries sustained in previous Israeli attack in the past 24 hours, increasing its count of the Palestinian death toll in Gaza to 48,297.
- Hamas said that it is ready to release all Israeli hostages at once in stage two of the truce agreement for a permanent truce and a complete withdrawal of Israeli forces from the Gaza Strip.
- Wafa reported that Israeli forces demolished a number of houses and burned others after announcing a demolition for construction of a street in Tulkarm Camp.
- Wafa reported that Israeli forces arrested a 14-year-old boy from Bethlehem Governorate.
- Israeli police said that it arrested four Israelis for illegally crossing the border into Lebanon overnight and hurling rocks towards IDF soldiers.
- Five IDF reservists were indicted on charges of abusing a Palestinian prisoner in Sde Teiman detention camp.
- A Tulkarm official said that Israeli forces destroyed 50 houses and 280 shops in Tulkarm Camp.
- Wafa reported that Israeli settlers expanded an outpost in the vicinity of Tayasir checkpoint, east of Tubas. It also reported that Israeli forces arrested a child from Beit Ummar.
- Lebanese media reported that an Israeli drone struck a car in Ayta ash-Shaab. Saudi media outlet AlHadath reported that a Hezbollah member was killed in the strike, while a woman was critically wounded. NNA reported that two people were injured separately in Wazzani after Israeli forces opened fire. The IDF said that it targeted a Hezbollah operative who handled arms.
- The Prisoners' Affairs Authority and the Palestinian Prisoners' Society said that Israeli authorities gave final authorisation to demolish the houses of two Palestinian prisoners.
- Wafa reported that a 50-year-old Palestinian woman was shot and wounded by Israeli forces in the vicinity of the entrance to Jenin refugee camp.
- The World Health Organization said that a mass polio vaccination campaign for children in Gaza is set to resume on 22 February.
- Rafah's Mayor said that Israeli forces fired at houses in the centre of Rafah and had shot at and detained two Palestinians.
- The IDF said that it fired warning shots at a group of people gathered near the Israeli border in Kfar Kila.
- The Commission of Prisoners' Affairs and the Palestinian Prisoners' Society said that at least 30 Palestinians including children were detained by Israeli forces.
- The Mujahideen Brigades said that the bodies of Israeli hostages Shiri Bibas and her children Ariel and Kfir will be handed over on 20 February, while the PIJ said that it will return the body of Israeli hostage Oded Lifshitz. Both groups said that they were killed in Israeli air strikes.
- Israeli authorities said that undercover police officers killed three Palestinian militants in Far'a. The IDF accused those killed of weapons smuggling. Two others were arrested.
- Palestinian media reported that several people were killed and injured in an Israeli drone strike in Rafah. The IDF said that it thwarted a smuggling operation using drones flying from Israel.
- Israel's Knesset approved legislation barring entry to foreigners who deny the Holocaust and the 7 October attacks or express support for the international prosecution of Israeli troops.

=== 20 February ===
- The Gaza Health Ministry reported that 22 bodies of people killed in Israeli attacks were retrieved from the rubble in the past 24 hours, increasing its count of the Palestinian death toll in Gaza to 48,319.
- Wafa reported that Israeli forces shot and injured a 15-year-old boy during a raid in Beita.
- The IDF said that it intercepted a drone transporting weapons from Israel to south Gaza, adding that it recently identified several such attempts.
- Coffins said to contain the bodies of Israeli hostages Shiri Bibas and her children Ariel and Kfir and Oded Lifshitz were handed over by Hamas. UN Human Rights Commissioner Volker Türk said that Hamas' parading of the coffins violated international law and it was also condemned by UN Secretary-General António Guterres. Later, Oded Lifshitz's family said that his body was identified. Prime Minister Netanyahu's office claimed that Lifshitz was killed in captivity by the PIJ. Abu Kabir Forensic Institute chief said that Lifshitz was killed in captivity more than a year ago.
- Israeli forces demolished the house of a Palestinian in Salfit accused of conducting a knife attack which killed two Israelis and injured two others in Holon.
- Al Jazeera Arabic reported that a Palestinian man was shot and killed by Israeli forces while inspecting his house in Shuja'iyya. The IDF said that it fired warning shots at Palestinian suspects who approached soldiers and "posed a threat" in several areas in Gaza before shooting a suspect who did not withdraw.
- Three bombs exploded in three empty buses parked at different places in Bat Yam in a suspected militant attack. In response, Netanyahu ordered the IDF to intensity operations in the West Bank.
- Lebanese media outlet Al Mayadeen reported an Israeli airstrike in Akkar District. The IDF said that it targeted a border crossing used by Hezbollah to smuggle weapons.

=== 21 February ===
- The IDF said that its forensic tests showed that one of four bodies handed over by Hamas was not that of hostage Shiri Bibas, adding that it identified Ariel Bibas and Kfir Bibas. It demanded Hamas to handover the body of Shiri Bibas. The IDF said that Hamas killed Ariel and Kfir Bibas "with bare hands". Hamas said that Shiri's remains had been mixed with those of other victims following an Israeli airstrike and said that it will examine allegations over Shiri's remains and asked Israel to return body of Palestinian woman. Later, Hamas stated that it had handed over the remains of Shiri Bibas. Her relatives said that her body was positively identified by forensic experts.
- Palestinian media outlets reported that a 15-year-old Palestinian teenager was shot and killed by Israeli forces in Shabtin, northwest of Ramallah. It also reported that a Palestinian man and a woman were wounded when an IDF vehicle rammed their car during a raid in Tulkarm, adding that two children and their relatives were assaulted and arrested by Israeli forces during a raid on Khirbet Yarza, east of Tubas.
- Palestinian media reported that leaflets threatening forced expulsion of Palestinians from Gaza appeared in the area.
- Al Jazeera Arabic reported that a Palestinian woman was killed in an Israeli strike in the al-Jnaina neighbourhood, east of Rafah.
- The IDF said that it detained 90 suspected militants and seized 15 firearms from the West Bank in the last week.
- Hamas said that will release Israeli hostage Eliya Cohen, Israeli hostage Omer Shem-Tov, Israeli hostage Omer Wenkert, Israeli-Austrian hostage Tal Shoham, Ethiopian Israeli hostage Avera Mengistu and Bedouin Arab Israeli hostage Hisham al-Sayed. Al-Sayed and Mengistu, both with history of mental illness, entered Gaza of their own accord, and held hostage by Hamas for over a decade.
- The al-Quds Brigades said one of its militants was killed during a battle with Israeli forces in Lebanon.
- Palestinian media outlets reported that Israeli forces assaulted and prevented Palestinians from reaching the Al-Aqsa Mosque in East Jerusalem.
- The Palestinian Ministry of Health said that a 13-year-old Palestinian girl died after being shot by Israeli forces in Jenin, while a 13-year-old Palestinian boy was killed in an Israeli strike in the Jabal Joher neighborhood of Hebron.
- Wafa reported that a Palestinian child was wounded by rubber-coated metal bullets and dozens of other people suffered from tear gas inhalation during clashes with Israeli forces in Kafr Qaddum.
- The BBC removed from its streaming services a controversial documentary about the war titled Gaza: How to Survive a Warzone because its narrator is a son of a Hamas' deputy minister of agriculture.
- Israeli forces shot and killed a 12-year-old Palestinian boy in Hebron.

=== 22 February ===
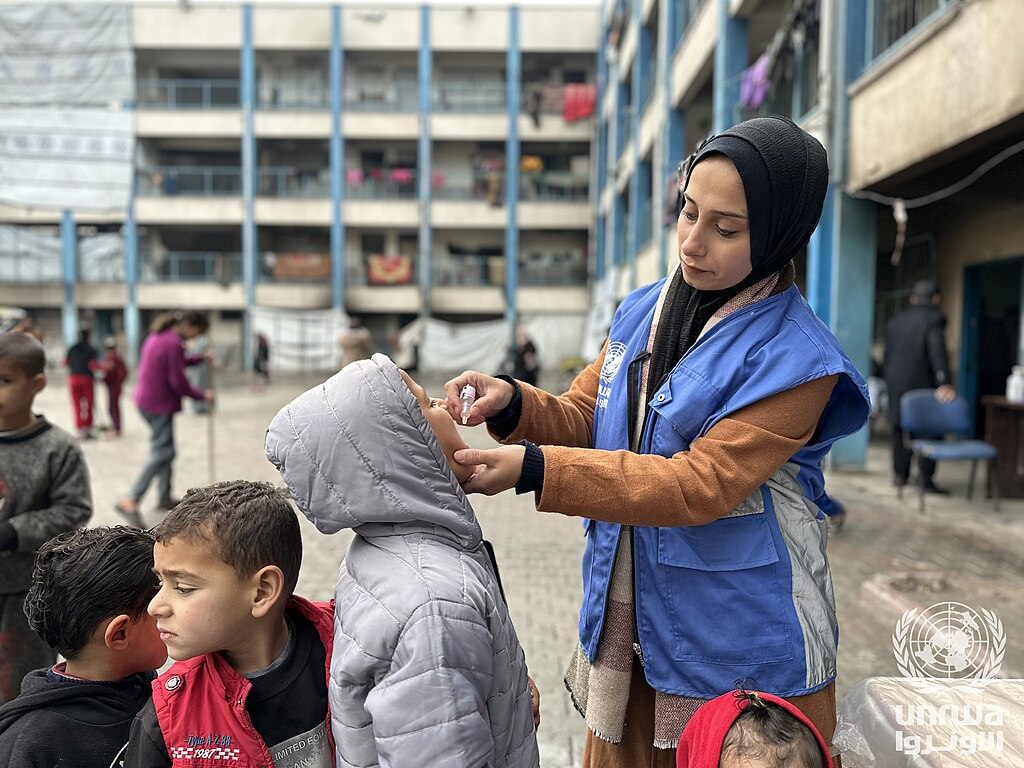
Polio vaccines being administered at an UNRAW shelter in Al-Shati refugee camp, the Gaza Strip, on 22 February 2025

- Hamas said that it ready to release rest of all hostages at once in the second phase for a sustainable truce, Israeli withdrawal from Gaza, and the release of Palestinian prisoners from Israeli jails.
- Third round of polio vaccination campaign for children below 10 year of age started in Gaza.
- Hostages Eliya Cohen, Omer Shem-Tov, Omer Wenkert, Tal Shoham, Avera Mengistu and Hisham al-Sayed were released by Hamas.
- Hamas politburo member Basem Naim said that the group is ready to abandon its administrative role in Gaza.
- Arab media outlets reported that Israeli settlers set fire to several buildings in a Palestinian Bedouin village in the vicinity of Jaba'. Ynet reported that the arson followed a series of clashes and stone-hurling incidents between settlers and Palestinians outside the nearby settlement of Geva Binyamin, injuring five people including three Palestinians and two Israelis.
- Wafa reported that Israeli settlers protected by Israeli forces attacked Deir Dibwan and stole livestock and water tanks from residents.
- The IDF said that it struck the Syrian-Lebanese border to thwart Hezbollah weapons smuggling.
- Palestinian prisoners and detainees who were supposed to be released in a hostage-prisoner exchange on February 22 were not released; Netanyahu said that their release will be delayed "until the release of the next hostages has been assured", and "without the humiliating ceremonies". Hamas called on the intervention of US mediators.

=== 23 February ===
- The Gaza Health Ministry reported that 10 bodies of people killed in Israeli attacks were brought to hospitals in the past 24 hours, increasing its count of the Palestinian death toll in Gaza to 48,339.
- Clashes were reported between Palestinians and Israeli forces during an Israeli raid in Beit Furik.
- The Jenin Brigades said that it hit Israeli forces in Qabatiya using an improvised explosive device.
- Lebanese media reported a series of Israeli airstrikes in the vicinity of Al-Qlailah and Zibqin near Tyre, injuring a Syrian girl and damaging a number of houses. The IDF said that targeted a Hezbollah military site containing rocket launchers and other arms where it identified the group's activity and several other Hezbollah rocket launchers in southern Lebanon.
- Lebanese media reported an Israeli airstrike in the vicinity of Brissa village, Hermel District.
- Wafa reported that Israeli settlers released their livestock on crops belonging to Palestinians in the northern Jordan Valley.
- Israeli Defense Minister Israel Katz said that he ordered the IDF to stay in Jenin refugee camp, Tulkarm camp and Nur Shams for the coming year.
- The Supreme Court of Israel granted the Netanyahu government another 90 days to answer on establishing a state commission of inquiry on 7 October attacks.
- Lebanese media reported Israeli airstrikes in the vicinity of Bodai and in the vicinity of al-Ahmadiya in southern Lebanon. The IDF said that it targeted Hezbollah sites containing rocket launchers and other arms in Baalbek and other areas of south Lebanon after identifying the group's activity.
- The IDF said that it arrested 26 militants during incursions across the occupied West Bank. It also said that the IDF, Shin Bet and Israeli police carried out field interrogations and confiscated three firearms.
- Wafa reported that a Palestinian man was shot and killed allegedly by Israeli long-range gunfire while inspecting his agricultural land on al-Shaaf Street, east of Gaza City. Al Jazeera reported that allegedly Israeli forces also shot a man in the Saudi neighbourhood, west of Rafah.
- The Israeli Defence Ministry and Israel police said that they thwarted an attempt to smuggle 650 smartphones, dozens of SIM cards, three projectors, and car replacement parts to Gaza on a humanitarian aid truck and arrested its driver, an Israeli civilian.
- Hamas said that it will not engage in further negotiations with Israel through mediators until Israel releases the 620 Palestinian prisoners supposed to be freed the previous day.
- Wafa reported that Israeli forces fired tear gas at the cemetery in Issawiya in East Jerusalem and nearby streets during the funeral of a Palestinian prisoner who was released as part of the truce deal and died after falling from the roof of his home the previous day.
- The Palestinian Prisoners' Club said that a man arrested from Gaza died in an Israeli jail. The IDF also confirmed his death. His family said that he did not suffer from any health problems prior to his arrest.

=== 24 February ===
- The Gaza Health Ministry reported that two people were killed in Israeli attacks and five bodies were recovered in the past 24 hours, increasing its count of the Palestinian death toll in Gaza to 48,346.
- Al Quds Brigades said it clashed with Israeli forces in Silat al-Harithiya neighbourhood of Jenin.
- Al Jazeera reported that Israeli settlers scrawled the Star of David and Hebrew graffiti on a wall in the Abu Shaban area, east of Yatta and set fire to a farmhouse.
- Hamas official Bassem Naim said that the group is ready to handover Gaza administration to any Palestinian body with representation of all Palestinians.
- Peace Now said that 1,170 Israeli settlement units in West Bank are expected to be approved by Israeli authorities.
- The IDF said that it detained two Palestinians for attacking and injuring two Israelis in the central West Bank two days prior. Other sources said that the incident was a clash between settlers and Palestinians that saw three Palestinians injured and settlers set fire to several buildings in a Bedouin village in the vicinity of Jaba. It also said that it detained eight wanted Palestinians during overnight raids in Jenin and Qaffin.
- Ynet reported that Israel told mediating nations that it is willing to release the 602 prisoners who were scheduled to be released on 22 February if Hamas returns the four bodies on this day which it was supposed to release this week without a ceremony.
- Gaza Civil Defense said that two Palestinians were injured in an Israeli drone strike in the vicinity of a school in the Tel al-Sultan refugee camp.
- The Palestinian Prisoners' Club said that at least 365 Palestinians including children were detained by Israeli forces in Jenin Governorate and Tulkarm Governorate since the start of its offensive.
- The Wall Street Journal reported that Hezbollah told its operatives who do not live south of the Litani River to vacate the area to allow the Lebanese Army to take control as part of the truce agreement.
- The IDF said that a rocket was fired from south Gaza but fell short in the Strip. Later, the IDF said that it struck the source of the rocket fire. It also said that it struck a second rocket firing site in the area.
- Senior Hamas politburo member Mousa Abu Marzook said that the group is ready to negotiate regarding its weapons.

=== 25 February ===
- The Gaza Health Ministry reported that one person was killed in Israeli attacks and one body were recovered in the past 24 hours, increasing its count of the Palestinian death toll in Gaza to 48,348.
- Three children died from hypothermia in Gaza.
- The Trump administration rescinded an order by the Biden administration which required it to report potential violations of international law using US-supplied weapons by allies including Israel.
- Israeli Defence Minister Israel Katz issued sanctions against released prisoners and their family members who received payments from the Palestinian Authority during their time in jail. Per his office, this order applies to those with Israeli citizenship and residents of Israel.
- Israeli media outlet Channel 12, citing Israeli sources, reported that a deal was reached between Israel and Hamas on returning early the bodies of the last four hostages that were to be handed over in the first stage of the truce agreement.
- A Tulkarm official said that 12,000 Palestinians were displaced from their houses during the Israeli offensive in Tulkarm Camp.
- Two mobile houses housing ten Palestinians from two families were demolished by the Israeli forces in the al-Bustan neighbourhood of Silwan in East Jerusalem. Wafa reported that the residents had previously been displaced after Israeli authorities demolished their houses in the same neighbourhood three months prior. It also reported that a home, agricultural greenhouses and livestock pens were demolished and trees were uprooted by Israeli forces in Issawiya, northeast of East Jerusalem, saying that the house was constructed with no license.
- A trial opened in Germany for four suspected Hamas members accused of organizing weapons caches throughout Europe. The prosecutors said that weapons were allegedly moved across Europe as a preparation for the 7 October attacks.
- Wafa reported that a disabled Palestinian shepherd was wounded by a group of Israeli settlers while grazing his livestock in Ibziq.
- Al Jazeera reported that Israeli forces shot and injured an elderly Palestinian man in Nablus.
- Lebanese media reported an Israeli airstrike in the Beqaa Valley. Lebanese media outlet Al Mayadeen reported that two people were killed and two others were injured in the strike. The IDF said that it conducted the strike after identifying militants at a Hezbollah strategic weapons manufacturing and storage facility.
- The IDF said that it fired towards vessels at the Gaza coast which violated maritime security restrictions and forced them back to shore.
- The IDF and Shin Bet said that they foiled a plan to target Israeli soldiers in the West Bank using 100 kilograms of explosives.
- Israel and Hamas said that they reached a deal to exchange the bodies of Israeli hostages who were agreed to be handed over during the first phase for releasing hundreds of Palestinian prisoners. Israeli media outlet Ynet reported that bodies of Israeli hostages will be handed over to Egyptian authorities with no public ceremony.
- Israel launched a series of airstrikes targeting sites in Rif Dimashq and Daraa, southern Syria, killing at least four people.

=== 26 February ===
- Wafa reported that Israeli forces ordered residents of 11 houses in Nur Shams to evacuate prior to their demolition.
- The Al-Nasser Salah al-Deen Brigades and Hamas said that they will release the bodies of Israeli hostages Ohad Yahalomi, Tsachi Idan, Itzik Elgarat, and Shlomo Mansour.
- Israeli forces arrested two students from a school in Dura.
- Ex-Detainees Affairs and the Palestinian Prisoner's Society said that Israeli forces arrested at least 50 Palestinians, including children throughout the West Bank.
- NNA reported that Israeli warplanes carried out mock raids while an Israeli surveillance drone flew above Lebanon.
- The IDF said a rocket was fired from Gaza but fell inside the Strip. Later, the IDF said that it struck several rocket launchers in an area in Gaza from which a rocket was launched earlier.
- A one-and-a-half-month-old girl died due to hypothermia in Gaza City.
- The Palestinian Prisoners and Detainees' Affairs Commission said that a Palestinian prisoner from Gaza died in Israeli custody, increasing the number of Palestinian prisoners who died in Israeli custody to 60 people since the beginning of the Gaza war. They also said that he did not suffer from any health problems prior to his arrest and was wounded during his detention.
- NNA reported that an Israeli drone strike on a car in the Hermel-Qasr road killed one person and injured another. The IDF said that it conducted an airstrike targeting Mahran Ali Nasruddin, a "significant" member of Hezbollah's Unit 4400 responsible for smuggling Iranian weapons after he "repeatedly violated" the truce.
- Wafa reported that a 16-year-old Palestinian teenager died after being shot by Israeli forces in Qalqilya.
- Hamas handed over the bodies of four Israeli hostages. Netanyahu's office said that three of those hostages were killed in captivity in Gaza and one of them were killed during the 7 October attacks.
- The WHO announced the conclusion of the third round of the polio vaccination campaign for children below 10 years of age in Gaza.
- 596 Palestinian prisoners were released by Israel.
- The International Criminal Court scrapped an arrest warrant against al-Qassam Brigades leader Mohammed Deif after Hamas confirmed his death.

=== 27 February ===
- The Gaza Health Ministry reported that 17 people were killed in Israeli attacks in the past 48 hours, increasing its count of the Palestinian death toll in Gaza to 48,365.
- Palestinian medics said that Israel returned the body of a Gazan woman that Hamas handed over in place of killed hostage Shiri Bibas to a hospital in Gaza following the return of Bibas's body.
- Hamas-owned media outlet Al-Aqsa TV reported that Israeli forces opened fire in the vicinity of Abasan al-Kabira.
- Wafa reported the construction of a road by Israeli settlers in Arab al-Melahat, west of Jericho.
- A demonstration was held in central Jerusalem titled "Occupation, expulsion and settlement", in rally for the support for the forcible expulsion of Palestinians in Gaza and the reestablishment of illegal Jewish settlements in the Gaza Strip, the demonstration was organized by the Nachala settlement group and other right-wing Zionist organizations. Limor Son Har-Melech of the ultranationalist Otzma Yehudit party stated that "Gaza is for Jews, Judea and Samaria is for Jews. They are ours in the merit of our fathers and the merit of our deeds".
- Shin Bet said that it arrested an Israeli suspected of spying for Iran.
- Wafa reported that one person was killed and two others including a 14-year-old boy were wounded during an Israeli raid in Balata Camp. It also reported that an elderly man suffered bruises after he was assaulted by Israeli forces.
- 46 Palestinian prisoners were released by Israel.
- A combined vehicle ramming and stabbing attack in the vicinity of Pardes Hanna-Karkur killed a 17-year-old teenage girl and injured 12 others. The attacker was shot and killed by Israeli police.
- The Lebanese Health Ministry said that one person was killed and another wounded after two Israeli air strikes hit a car in Hermel.
- The IDF said that it conducted a drone strike on a Hezbollah observation post in Aynata where it identified activity.
- Wafa reported that Israeli gunfire wounded a doctor and a young woman in Jenin and Jenin refugee camp.
- The IDF released its probe regarding the 7 October attacks.
- Al Jazeera Arabic reported an Israeli drone strike in Deir Qanoun an-Naher.

=== 28 February ===
- Hamas-run media outlet Al-Aqsa TV reported that Israeli forces opened fire on two vehicles in Abasan al-Kabira.
- Al-Aqsa TV reported that the PNSF arrested a commander of the Tulkarm Brigade during a raid in Nur Shams.
- Palestinian Information Center reported heavy Israeli firing at the outskirts of Aitaroun.
- The IDF said that it killed Hezbollah member Muhammad Mahdi Ali Shaheen in an air strike in Hermel, saying that he was responsible for coordinating weapons procurement around the Syria-Lebanon border since the start of the truce between Israel and Hezbollah.
- Al Jazeera Arabic and Wafa reported that an Israeli drone strike in Rafah killed a Palestinian man. Wafa also reported that Israeli naval vessels opened fire and wounded two Palestinian fishermen while fishing off Gaza City.
- UN estimated that approximately 37,000 Palestinians were displaced due to the Israeli offensive in the West Bank.
- Three sources said that authorities at Beirut airport seized $2.5 million in cash allegedly destined for Hezbollah.
- The IDF said that it struck two suspects who were identified near soldiers and posed a threat to them in south Gaza.
- The Trump administration approved close to $3 billion in weapons sales to Israel, to be delivered between 2026 and 2028, without a normal congressional review.

== March ==
=== 1 March ===
- The Gaza Health Ministry reported that two people were killed in Israeli attacks and 21 bodies were recovered in the past 48 hours, increasing its count of the Palestinian death toll in Gaza to 48,388.
- Hamas rejected an Israeli proposal to extend phase one of the ceasefire to release more hostages and demanded the implementation of the second phase.
- Israeli forces ordered residents of Nur Shams to evacuate.
- Palestinian media reported that Israeli settlers set fire to a vehicle owned by a Palestinian outside Silwad.
- Wafa reported that three children were shot and injured by Israeli forces during a raid in Beit Furik.
- Israeli settlers under protection of Israeli forces attacked houses in Bruqin.
- Netanyahu's office said that Israel endorsed a US plan to extend the Gaza truce for the Ramadan and Passover periods. His office also said that half of the living and dead hostages would be released on the first day of the extended truce and the rest of hostages would be released at the end of the period if a permanent truce is reached. It said that initial deal allows Israel to resume war at any moment after 1 March if negotiations are deemed ineffective. Hamas reiterated its demand for implementation of second stage of truce.
- Wafa reported that settlers attacked Arab al-Melahat, northwest of Jericho.
- US Secretary of State Marco Rubio said that he signed a declaration to expedite the delivery of about $4 billion in military assistance to Israel.

=== 2 March ===
- Netanyahu's office admitted that his intelligence officer received and did not pass an alert three hours before the 7 October attacks, citing its non-urgent framing.
- Palestinian media reported that at least one person was killed and another person was injured in an Israeli drone strike in Beit Hanoun.
- Netanyahu's office said that he decided to cease the entry of aid to Gaza following end of stage one of the truce agreement and Hamas's refusal to accept the US proposal.
- Israeli strikes in Gaza killed four Palestinians including a woman and wounded five others. Israeli shelling was also reported in the vicinity of Khan Yunis. The IDF said that it conducted drone strikes on suspects who planted an explosive device on its soldiers and posed other threats.
- Two Palestinians were wounded in an Israeli settler attack in Asfi, south of Hebron.
- The Southern District Attorney's office indicted a man from Beersheba for giving information regarding Israel's nuclear program to Iran. Israeli police said the data was already public.
- The IDF said that it killed about 25 militants in the West Bank.
- Asharq Al-Awsat reported that the estimated death toll of the war in Lebanon since 8 October 2023 was increased to 6,000 after Lebanese medics recovered bodies from south Lebanon villages formerly occupied by Israel.

=== 3 March ===
- Wafa reported that a three-year-old girl was suffocated after Israeli forces fired tear gas towards the entrance to the Jenin refugee camp.
- Wafa reported an Israeli settler attack in a village in Masafer Yatta.
- A 16-year-old boy was injured during an Israeli raid in Biddya.
- Palestinian media reported that Israeli forces shot and killed two people in central Rafah. Wafa reported that three people were injured when a helicopter fired a missile at al-Mawasi, Khan Yunis. The IDF said that it struck a vessel which passed a maritime boundary off the coast of northern Khan Yunis after warning shots were fired and opened fire in a separate occasion on two suspects who "posed an imminent threat" in south Gaza.
- A stabbing attack in Haifa killed an elderly man and wounded three others, three of them critically. Israeli police said that the attacker, an Israeli-Druze, was "neutralised". The attacker is said to have suffered from mental illness.
- The Palestinian Prisoners Society reported that a Palestinian detainee who was held under administrative detention died in Megiddo prison without no health problems before his detention, increasing the number of Palestinians who died in Israeli custody since the start of the Gaza war to 61.
- The PIJ said that one of its militants was killed while confronting alleged Israeli aggression in Lebanon.
- Wafa reported that Israeli forces shot a 13-year-old Palestinian child and a 15-year-old Palestinian child during a raid in Odala.

=== 4 March ===
- The PRCS said that two Palestinians including a 17-year-old were injured by Israeli forces in Beita.
- Rafah municipal authorities said that Israel disconnected electricity to the two desalination plants in the area.
- Al Jazeera reported that Israeli forces shot and killed a Palestinian in the vicinity of Deir el-Balah. The IDF said that it opened fire towards a suspect in south Gaza who "posed an imminent threat" to its forces.
- Al Jazeera reported that Israeli gunfire injured a child in Jenina neighbourhood in eastern Rafah.
- Lebanese media reported that an Israeli drone strike in Rechknanay killed one person. The IDF said that it killed a naval commander in Hezbollah's Radwan Force who "violated truce".
- The Palestinian Prisoner's club said that Israeli forces rearrested a female prisoner released as part of the truce agreement.
- The IDF said that it killed three Palestinian militants including local Hamas leader Isser Saadi in a firefight in Jenin and arrested three other militants. Later, Hamas confirmed Saadi's death.
- The IDF said that it shot and killed a Palestinian militant who opened fire on Israeli forces in the vicinity of Homesh.
- The Shin Bet published its report into the 7 October attacks.
- The Arab League, meeting in Cairo, devised a $53bn plan detailing the reconstruction of Gaza while keeping its population in place.

=== 5 March ===
- The Gaza Health Ministry reported that four people were killed in Israeli attacks, 30 bodies were recovered and one person died due to his injuries in the past 24 hours, increasing its count of the Palestinian death toll in Gaza to 48,440.
- OCHA said that more than more than 3,000 children and 1,000 pregnant and breastfeeding women in Gaza were diagnosed with acute malnutrition since the ceasefire.
- Israeli forces destroyed the house of two Palestinian militants in Hebron who killed 7 people in the 2024 Jaffa shooting.
- NNA reported that an Israeli drone strike on a vehicle near a rubbish dump in Ras Naqoura wounded two siblings who were "collecting scrap metal". The IDF said that it conducted a drone strike on a vehicle after it identified a group of suspects loading up weapons.
- The Trump administration confirmed it was holding direct talks with Hamas with the goal of releasing American hostages held in Gaza and the possibility of a broader agreement to reach a long-term ceasefire.
- The IDF said that it demolished the house of a Palestinian assailant in Rafat who killed an Israeli soldier in a car-ramming attack in September 2024.
- The PRCS said that Israeli forces shot a nine-year-old girl in the head in Qusra.

=== 6 March ===
- Wafa and local sources reported that Israeli forces shot and injured a 20-year-old woman in the head in Qusra, injured a 14-year-old boy during a raid in ar-Rihiya and reported clashes in Silwad.
- Médecins Sans Frontières said that a Palestinian man was shot next to the entrance of the al-Shaboura clinic in Rafah.
- Palestinian media reported that one person was killed and several others were injured in an Israeli drone strike on a "civilian gathering" in Shuja'iyya. The IDF said that its drone strike targeted several suspects who were identified planting a bomb in the vicinity of its soldiers.
- The IDF said that it destroyed a bomb-making lab and a drone-building site in Tulkarm.

=== 7 March ===
- Palestinian media reported that two people were killed in an Israeli strike in Shuja'iyya. The IDF said that it conducted a drone strike in north Gaza on a group of suspects planting a bomb adjacent to Israeli soldiers.
- Wafa reported that Israeli forces operated in Ni'lin, triggering clashes. It also reported that live ammunition and tear gas canisters fired by Israeli forces injured two Palestinian teenagers.
- NNA reported consecutive Israeli airstrikes in several places in south Lebanon. The IDF said that it targeted Hezbollah military sites used for storing weapons and rocket launchers.
- The Houthis said that it will resume naval operations targeting Israel if it does not lift its aid blockage to Gaza within four days.
- Wafa reported that dozens of armed Israeli settlers attacked the Bedouin community of Al-Auja and stole sheep belonging to Palestinian residents. Some of the animals were later found slaughtered.
- Al Jazeera reported that Israeli forces fired on houses in Gaza City's Tuffah neighbourhood.
- China announced support for the Egypt-led proposal for reconstruction of Gaza.

=== 8 March ===
- The Gaza Health Ministry reported that six people were killed in Israeli attacks and seven bodies were recovered in the past 48 hours, increasing its count of the Palestinian death toll in Gaza to 48,453.
- The Organisation of Islamic Cooperation endorsed the Egypt-led proposal for reconstruction of Gaza. France, Germany, Italy and the United Kingdom also announced support for the proposal, saying that Hamas "must neither govern Gaza nor be a threat to Israel any more".
- Al Jazeera reported heavy firing of Israeli tanks in the vicinity of Rafah crossing. It also reported that an Israeli drone strike on a group of people in Rafah killed at least two Palestinians. The Quds Press Agency reported that IDF vehicles are conducting "intensive and continuous gunfire" in al-Salam neighbourhood, east of Rafah. The IDF said that it conducted strikes on "suspects" who picked up a drone flown from Israel to south Gaza.
- Lebanese media reported that an Israeli drone strike on a car between Kherbet Selem and Al-Jumayjimah caused casualties. The IDF said that it targeted a Hezbollah operative who was involved in the rehabilitation of Hezbollah infrastructure and directed its operations in south Lebanon. Lebanese Civil Defense said that one person was killed and another injured in an Israeli air strike on Khirbet Selem.
- Al Jazeera reported that two Palestinians were wounded in an Israeli drone strike on Abasan al-Kabira. It also reported that seven Palestinians were also injured when an Israeli drone hit a bulldozer removing rubble in Beit Hanoun.
- Al Jazeera reported that Israeli settlers attacked Palestinians and their houses in a village in Masafer Yatta. It also reported that Israeli forces arrested three Palestinians.
- The Wall Street Journal reported that Israel drafted a "maximum pressure" plan for implementation if Hamas does not free its remaining hostages.
- The Palestinian Information Center reported that Israeli settlers attacked Al-Auja and stole 800 sheep.
- Al Jazeera Arabic reported that an Israeli drone strike in Salah al-Din Road in central Gaza injured three people, while three others were wounded by another drone strike in al-Brazil neighbourhood in Rafah.
- Wafa reported that Israeli settlers protected by Israeli forces attacked and injured Palestinians including women and children from Wadi Jahish community, Masafer Yatta.
- The Lebanese Army said that it found Israeli espionage devices on the outskirts of Kfarchouba and deployed specialised military units to dismantle them.
- Wafa reported that clashes took place between locals and IDF in Kafr Qaddum when soldiers took up positions in the vicinity of Omar bin al-Khattab Mosque.
- Al Jazeera reported that some Israeli soldiers vandalised houses in the al-Mahjar neighbourhood of Nur Shams.

=== 9 March ===
- Al Jazeera reported that the North Gaza Police's director of its explosives engineering department was wounded due to the detonation of munitions left behind by Israeli forces while inspecting a site in Jabalia where three children were injured in an earlier explosion.
- Al Quds Today reported that Israeli forces arrested two released Palestinian prisoners from Hebron.
- Wafa and Al Jazeera reported that an Israeli strike killed at least two person and wounded several others, some of them seriously in Shuja'iyya. It also reported an Israeli drone strike adjacent to Maghazi refugee camp. The IDF said that it targeted a group of militants trying to plant a bomb in the vicinity of its soldiers.
- Israeli Energy Minister Eli Cohen ordered a halt to the supply of Israeli electricity to Gaza.
- The Jerusalem Post reported that an Israeli drone which was observing a funeral in Kfar Kila opened fire at several suspects who approached Israeli forces. Lebanese media reported that one person died of a heart attack after the incident, and several others were injured.

=== 10 March ===
- Palestinian media reported clashes between Palestinian militants and IDF soldiers in the eastern market in the Old City of Nablus.
- The Palestinian Information Center reported that IDF vehicles opened fire in the vicinity of Al-Fukhari.
- The IDF started investigations into at least six cases on soldiers operating in the Gaza suspected of using Palestinians as human shields.
- Al Jazeera reported that an Israeli strike in Tel al-Sultan refugee camp injured a Palestinian woman.
- According to the Gaza Government Media Office, food supplies started to run out in markets.
- A Palestinian militant threw a rock towards a vehicle belonging to Israelis, slightly injuring a two-year-old child.
- The IDF said that it shot militants trying to plant a bomb near its soldiers in Shuja'iyya and carried out a drone strike on three militants attempting a separate bomb attack near Nuseirat.
- Al-Akhbar reported that a Lebanese soldier was injured by IDF fire in the vicinity of the Shanouh Farm on the outskirts of Kfar Shouba before being abducted to Israel.
- The IDF said that it struck a number of suspects in south Gaza who were attempting to pick a drone flying from Israel to Gaza.
- Palestinian National Security Forces said that it killed Abdul-Rahman Abu Muna, a militant in Jenin, claiming that he opened fire at them and they returned fire.

=== 11 March ===
- The Gaza Health Ministry reported that four people were killed in Israeli attacks and 32 bodies were recovered in the past 24 hours, increasing its count of the Palestinian death toll in Gaza to 48,503.
- Wafa reported that an Israeli drone shot and killed a Palestinian man east of Rafah.
- Palestinian media reported that Israeli forces arrested a released Palestinian prisoner from Hebron, while Israeli forces stopped a vehicle and assaulted its occupants in Halhul.
- Palestinian media and Al Jazeera Arabic reported that Israeli settlers attacked several vehicles belonging to Palestinians in Umm Safa.
- Al Jazeera reported that the IDF vehicles targeted Om al-Nasr using heavy gunfire.
- Al Jazeera reported that an Israeli drone killed a Palestinian woman in ash-Shawka, east of Rafah.
- A Palestinian militant stole a car and crashed it into a checkpoint outside an IDF base south of Ben Gurion Airport, injuring a soldier before being arrested.
- The IDF said that it killed three militants and injured another militant during its offensive in the West Bank, and arrested 35 others including Hamas militants.
- Wafa reported that Israeli settlers attacked residents and their property in Haribat al-Nabi village in Masafer Yatta.
- The Palestinian Health Ministry said that a 58-year-old woman was killed by Israeli fire in Jenin.
- Israeli police raided a prominent bookshop in East Jerusalem and arrested one of its Palestinian owners. Israeli police said that it carried out the raid after a caller reported "inciting content" in books.
- Al Jazeera Arabic reported that six people were killed in an Israeli drone strike in the vicinity of the Netzarim Corridor. The IDF said that the strike was ordered after suspects were identified acting in a suspicious manner on land in central Gaza and they posed a threat its soldiers.
- NNA reported that a drone strike targeted a car on a road in Deir ez-Zahrani. An-Nahar reported one casualty from the strike. The IDF said that its drone strike in Nabatieh targeted Hassan Abbas Izzedine, a commander of Hezbollah's aerial defense unit who "led attempts to rebuild the unit's infrastructure" and another strike targeted a group of Hezbollah militants who were spotted at a Hezbollah facility in Froun.
- The IDF said that it conducted a drone strike on a suspect conducting surveillance on soldiers in southern Gaza.
- Five Lebanese detainees held by the IDF were released.
- The Palestinian Red Crescent Society said that a 17-year-old child and a 16-year-old child were wounded by Israeli gunfire during a raid in Fawwar, Hebron.
- Houthis announced that it would resume their attacks on Israeli vessels until aid to Gaza was reinstated and all border crossings to the strip were opened.

=== 12 March ===
- The Gaza Health Ministry reported that five people were killed in Israeli attacks and seven bodies were recovered in the past 24 hours, increasing its count of the Palestinian death toll in Gaza to 48,515.
- The Quds News Network and Anadolu Agency reported that a Palestinian girl was shot and killed by Israeli forces in central Deir el-Balah.
- Al Jazeera reported that Israeli forces opened fire at houses in Khan Yunis.
- Palestinian media reported that Israeli forces conducted "bombing operations" east of Gaza City.
- Israeli forces demolished a house belonging to a Palestinian militant accused of killing an Israeli civilian in Qalqilya in June 2024.
- The Quds Press agency and Al Jazeera Arabic reported Israeli shelling in the north Gaza coast and in the vicinity of Khan Yunis.
- Al Jazeera reported that Israeli forces opened fire in the southern and eastern areas of Rafah, killing a Palestinian man.
- Al Jazeera reported that a Palestinian died from Israeli gunfire in Khuza'a, Khan Yunis.
- The IDF reported that it returned a 4-year-old boy who said Hamas sent him to an IDF post in Gaza.
- Wafa reported that Israeli forces detained three sisters from Beit Kahil.
- Wafa reported that several Palestinians civilians suffered tear gas inhalation during an IDF raid in Al-Khader.
- An 18-year-old Israeli civilian was moderately injured in a gun attack in the vicinity of Ariel. Hamas praised the shooting and claimed responsibility, saying it was a response to the 2025 Israeli operation in the West Bank.
- Houthi leader Abdul-Malik al-Houthi said that the Houthi decision to prohibit Israel-linked vessels from sailing in the Red Sea, Bab al-Mandab, the Gulf of Aden, and the Arabian Sea went into force and that any Israeli-linked ship sailing through the said areas will be targeted.
- Wafa reported that a 45-year-old Palestinian woman was wounded by a sonic grenade during the entry of Israeli forces and settlers to Joseph's Tomb.
- The PRCS said that six Palestinians were injured during clashes between locals and Israeli forces in Husan.

=== 13 March ===
- The Gaza Health Ministry reported that at least two people were killed in Israeli attacks and seven bodies were recovered in the past 24 hours, increasing its count of the Palestinian death toll in Gaza to 48,524.
- The Quds News Network reported an explosion in Shuja'iyya, while the Shehab News Agency reported "heavy gunfire" east of Khan Yunis, in the vicinity of the boundary with Israel.
- Clashes were reported between Israeli forces and Palestinians in Al-Arroub.
- The Palestinian Information Center and the Quds Press Agency reported that Israeli settlers attacked a Palestinian farmer in Burqa, Nablus.
- The Palestinian Information Center reported that Israeli forces were targeted using molotov cocktails in Abwein.
- The Lebanese Army said that it received a fifth Lebanese soldier from Israeli custody.
- Al Jazeera reported that Israeli forces fired at Palestinian houses in Shuja'iyya.
- Israeli police arrested a man from Taybeh, Ramallah accused of joining Islamic State and spying on Israeli soldiers to attack Israel as a revenge for the Gaza war.
- Al Jazeera reported that a 66-year-old woman was detained by Israeli forces from Um al-Sharayet neighbourhood of Ramallah.
- Al Jazeera and Palestinian media reported that Israeli gunfire in Maghazi refugee camp wounded at least one Palestinian. The IDF said that it conducted a drone strike targeting a cell of militants in the central Gaza Strip after they were identified attempting to plant a bomb in the ground.
- Syrian sources reported that Israeli aircraft conducted a strike in Damascus. The IDF said that it targeted the Damascus headquarters of PIJ used for planning and conducting "terror" activity. A PIJ member said that it targeted the house of PIJ leader Ziyad al-Nakhalah and added that Nakhalah is not in Syria. A Syrian official said that three civilians were wounded, including a woman who was seriously injured and the building housed office that has been abandoned since the Fall of the Assad regime.
- Israeli police said that at least one Palestinian assailant attacked and injured an Israeli settler while herding sheep near Ma'ale Amos.
- Wafa reported that the IDF issued an order to confiscate approximately 0.74 acres (0.3 hectares) of land in Haris, Salfit.
- Wafa reported that an Israeli drone fire towards Palestinians in Shuja'iyya killed a three-year-old child.
- Lebanese media reported an Israeli strike in the Bekaa Valley. The IDF said it targeted a Hezbollah strategic weapons production and storage site.
- Al Jazeera Arabic and Wafa reported that an Israeli drone strike hit a tent in Beit Hanoun, killing a boy and wounding his mother.
- Palestinians reported that dozens of settlers attacked Khirbet al Marajim and set several houses on fire. Clashes were also reported between villages and settlers in the same area. The Shin Bet and Israeli police said that they are investigating several instances of settler attacks in the area. They also said that suspected settler attacks happened shortly after several Palestinians attempted to steal a herd owned by Israeli settlers in the vicinity of Khirbet Al-Marjam.
- A Palestinian man who hacked into the medical files of a freed Israeli hostage, was arrested and interrogated by the Israeli police.

=== 14 March ===
- Al Jazeera reported that Israeli forces and Palestinian militants exchanged gunfire in Aqqaba.
- Al Jazeera reported that Israeli settlers set fire to houses and cars belonging to Palestinians in Duma, Nablus.
- US and Israeli officials said that they contacted officials from Sudan, Somalia and Somaliland for resettling Palestinians uprooted from Gaza as part of Trump's proposed postwar plan. However, Somaliland foreign minister said that they are not in any talks regarding resettlement of Palestinians.
- The IDF said that it arrested more than 100 wanted Palestinians during operations in the West Bank in the last week. It also said that it seized dozens of weapons.
- The IDF said it conducted a strike targeting a group of militants who were trying to plant bombs near where its soldiers were operating in central Gaza.
- Hamas said that it agreed to a proposal from mediators to release Israeli-American hostage Edan Alexander and the bodies of four dual national hostages.
- Al Jazeera reported that an Israeli air strike in Zaytun Quarter killed four people.
- Wafa reported that Israeli forces raided a town east of Nablus and triggered clashes, seriously injuring a young Palestinian man.
- Wafa reported that Israeli naval forces shelled a boat off the coast of Al-Sudaniya, north of Gaza, killing a Palestinian fisherman.
- Wafa reported that Israeli forces detained two 16-year-old Palestinian teenagers from Silwad.
- The Forum of Palestinian Journalists said that Alaa Hashim, a Palestinian journalist, died from injuries sustained in an Israeli strike in Gaza City, increasing the number of Palestinian journalists that it counted to have been killed due to Israeli strikes in Gaza since the start of the war to 206.

=== 15 March ===
- The Gaza Health Ministry reported that seven people were killed in Israeli attacks and 12 bodies were recovered in the past 24 hours, increasing its count of the Palestinian death toll in Gaza to 48,543.
- Al Jazeera Arabic reported that the IDF gunboats stationed off the coast of south Gaza opened fire at Rafah.
- Wafa reported that several Palestinians were injured by Israeli forces during a raid on a house in Al Raihiya in southern Hebron.
- Wafa reported that Israeli settlers protected by Israeli forces bulldozed farmland belonging to Palestinians in Wadi al-Matwi.
- Al Jazeera reported that Israeli forces opened fire on an ambulance transporting a patient from Nur Shams.
- The Quds News Network reported that Israeli tanks opened fire in the Shabura neighbourhood of central Rafah.
- The Rafah municipality said that fuel supplies to all water wells in Rafah halted because of the continued Israeli blockade and the closure of crossings.
- Palestinian media and Al Jazeera reported that an Israeli airstrike in Beit Lahia killed eight aid workers and a journalist. The IDF said that it launched two strikes targeting two militants operating a drone and a group of militants who collected the drone operating equipment. It shared details of six people killed in the strike, saying that they were militants pretending as journalists, and one of them participated in the 7 October attacks.
- UNICEF said that acute malnutrition in north Gaza doubled in a month and at least 23 children reportedly died due to malnutrition and dehydration in recent weeks.
- Lebanese media and the Lebanese Health Ministry reported that an Israeli drone struck a car with two occupants in Borj al-Mlouk, killing one person. The IDF said that it targeted a Hezbollah member.
- The IDF removed a platoon of reservists from Gaza after a video posted on social media showed them opening fire while reading the Book of Esther. The IDF said these actions are against its fundamental values and court martialed the reservists.
- Wafa reported that a Palestinian shepherd was wounded in an Israeli settler attack in Masafer Yatta.
- The US said that it conducted aerial and naval strikes on dozens of Houthi military targets in Yemen after President Trump ordered an escalated military campaign against the Houthis. According to the Houthi-run health ministry, at least 31 people were killed and 101 others were wounded, most of them women and children. Six senior Houthi members were reportedly among the dead.
- Wafa reported that Israeli gunfire and drone strikes in Beit Lahia and Juhor ad-Dik killed three Palestinians, including a child and a woman and injured eight others.
- Al Jazeera Arabic reported clashes between Israeli forces and Palestinian youths in Fawwar, Hebron.
- Six young Palestinian men were detained during clashes between Israeli forces and residents in Beit Furik and Beit Dajan, Nablus.
- A young man was shot during clashes with Israeli forces in 'Anata.

=== 16 March ===
- The Gaza Health Ministry reported that 14 people were killed in Israeli attacks and 15 bodies were recovered in the past 24 hours, increasing its count of the Palestinian death toll in Gaza to 48,572.
- Palestinian media reported that Israeli tanks opened fire towards Palestinians in south Gaza.
- NNA reported that an Israeli strike on a car in the vicinity of Yatar killed one person and injured another person. The IDF said that it targeted two Hezbollah militants whom it accused of violating the ceasefire.
- Wafa reported that an Israeli drone strike in Juhor ad-Dik killed a Palestinian man and injured several others.
- Wafa reported that Israeli forces continued clearing large swaths of land belonging to Palestinians in Wadi al-Matwi in Salfit for the fourth consecutive day as part of a planned road for settlers to access an outpost. It also added that Israeli settlers raised the Israeli flag in the area.
- The IDF said that it found UNRWA equipment along with hidden weapons in Nur Shams.
- Palestinian authorities said that Palestinians detainees in Ktzi'ot Prison were subjected to beatings and rubber bullets in the last week.
- Wafa reported that Israeli settlers attacked and wounded an elderly man in the vicinity of the Cave of the Patriarchs.
- Qatari media outlet Al-Araby Al-Jadeed reported that about 15 deported Palestinian prisoners released from Israeli jails arrived in Turkey.
- The IDF said it conducted a drone strike targeting a militant attempting to plant bombs near its soldiers in the Netzarim Corridor.
- The Houthis claimed that it targeted the USS Harry S. Truman aircraft carrier using 18 ballistic and cruise missiles and a drone. A US official said that a US aircraft shot down 11 drones launched by Houthis towards USS Harry S Truman aircraft carrier and a missile fired by Houthis failed in flight and splashed down into the sea. Later, the Houthis said that they fired missiles and drones towards USS Harry S. Truman aircraft carrier and its several warships for the second time.
- Lebanese Health Ministry said that one person was killed in an Israeli strike in Mais al-Jabal and NNA reported another death due to Israeli strike in Bint Jbeil.
- A parked car in Avivim was struck by apparent gunfire from Lebanon, resulting in no casualties. Israeli Defense Minister Israel Katz rejected claims that it was errant gunfire from the funeral of a Hezbollah militant held in a nearby village and ordered the IDF to respond to the gunfire. Lebanese media outlets reported that two people were killed in an Israeli airstrike in Ainata. Additional Israeli shelling and drone strikes were reported in south Lebanon including in Kfar Kila and Yaroun. The IDF said that it hit a command center belonging to Hezbollah's Redwan Force and other buildings used by the group.
- Gaza Health officials said that a 62-year-old Palestinian was killed and several others were wounded in an Israeli drone strike in Juhor ad-Dik.
- Wafa reported that two Palestinians including a 22-year-old woman died from injuries sustained in Israeli strikes in Gaza.
- Yemen's Houthi-run Health Ministry said that the death toll due to US strike on Yemen increased to 53 deaths including five children, two women and 98 injuries.
- Al-Masirah reported two US strikes in Al Hudaydah. Saba News Agency reported that two US air strikes hit the command post of Galaxy Leader while other strikes hit a cancer facility and a cotton shop in Houthi-controlled areas of Yemen.
- A US strike hit As Safra district, killing 10 civilians, including four children and injuring 11 civilians, including two children.

=== 17 March ===
- Al Masirah reported a US attack on a government complex in the al-Hazm district of Al Jawf Governorate, Yemen.
- Al Jazeera reported that Israeli forces arrested released prisoner Ali Khaled Zawahra after raiding his house in Bethlehem.
- Locals said that Palestinians were attacked using stones while a few olive trees were destroyed by eight masked men and one known settler in Susiya. A 60-year-old Palestinian man and a 47-year-old Palestinian woman were slightly wounded.
- Wafa reported that two 15-year-old children were arrested by Israeli forces from Jalazone.
- European Union foreign policy chief Kaja Kallas announced support for the Arab reconstruction plan for Gaza.
- Jenin's Mayor said that at least 21,000 people were displaced due to Israel's offensive in Jenin refugee camp.
- Wafa reported that an Israeli strike in Wadi Gaza Bridge area in central Gaza killed three young men and wounded several others. Al Jazeera reported that another Israeli strike in al-Jnaina, east of Rafah injured at least three Palestinians. The IDF said that it struck militants planting bombs. A women at the scene of the strike in central Gaza said that those killed were collecting firewood.
- Lebanese media reported that an Israeli strike on a car in Yohmor killed at two people and injured two others. The IDF said that it targeted two Hezbollah militants who served as observation operatives and directed militant activities.
- Wafa reported that Israeli authorities notified the Palestinian Authority regarding the seizure of 12 hectares (30 acres) of land from Jalbun.
- Medics said that an Israeli airstrike on a school serving as shelter for displaced people in Bureij killed a father and son. The IDF said it conducted an airstrike in central Gaza on two militants trying to plant a bomb.
- Al Masirah reported US strikes on an iron factory in the Bajil District of Al Hudaydah Governorate.
- At least four Israeli strikes were reported by Lebanese media in the Beqaa Valley. The IDF said that it targeted Hezbollah military sites after spotting militants and weapons.
- Two people were killed and 19 others were injured by an Israeli airstrike in Syria's Daraa Governorate, targeting military sites according to the IDF.
- Al Masirah reported a US strike on a government complex building in Al Hazm, Yemen.
