= Meiser =

Arab village in northern Israel

Meiser: מֵיסִר (Hebrew); ميسر (Arabic)

Hebrew transcription(s)
  - Unofficial: Shaykh Maysar, Shaykh Maysir, Khirbat Maysar
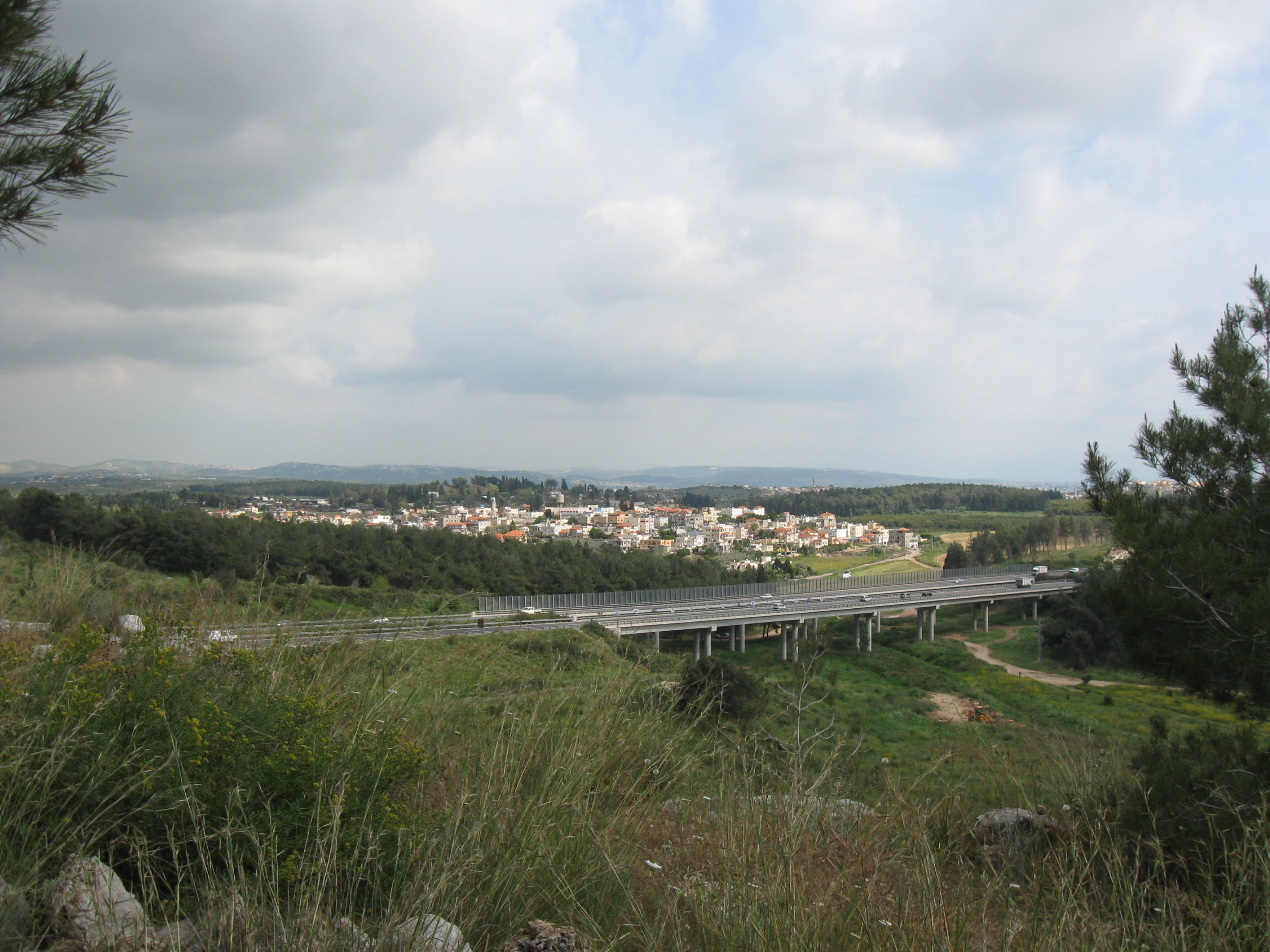
- Etymology: Sheikh Meisir, p.n.; meaning a certain gambling game with arrows.
- Location within Haifa region of Israel Location within Israel
- Coordinates: 32°26′41″N 35°2′31″E
- Grid position: 203/705 ITM; 154/205 PAL
- Country: Israel
- District: Haifa
- Subdistrict: Hadera
- Council: Menashe
- Population (2024): 1,952

Meiser (Arabic: ميسر; Hebrew: מֵיסַר, also known as Shaykh Maysar or Khirbat Maysar) is an Arab village in northern Israel. Located half a kilometre west of the Green Line, north of the city of Baqa al-Gharbiyye in the triangle area of Wadi Ara, it is one of three Arab villages under the jurisdiction of Menashe Regional Council. In 2024 it had a population of 1,952.

== History ==
=== Roman Empire ===
Remains from the Early Roman era (end of the first century BCE–beginning of the first century CE) have been found here. Three strata from the Roman-Byzantine periods was excavated in the centre of the village. A bathhouse, dating from the same time, has also been found.

=== Byzantine Empire ===
Ceramics and other remains from the Byzantine era have been found here. An excavation revealed remains dating from the end of the Byzantine period (7th century CE), and above it were remains of a residential house from the Abbasid period (9th–10th centuries CE).

=== Ottoman Empire ===
In 1882, the PEF's Survey of Western Palestine (SWP) found at Sheikh Meisir "foundations near a modern Mukam" (Muslim tomb). In spite of this, Andrew Petersen, who inspected the Maqam in 1994, suggested "that the building may be considerably older than the nineteenth century."

=== British Mandate ===
In the 1922 census of Palestine, conducted by the British Mandate authorities, Kherbet Maisir had a population of 49 Muslims.

In the 1945 statistics Meiser was counted with Qaffin and Kh. el Aqaba, together they had a population of 1,570 Muslims, with a land area of 23,755 dunams, according to an official land and population survey. Of this, 5,863 dunams were plantations and irrigable land, 8,371 were used for cereals, while 40 dunams were built-up (urban) land.

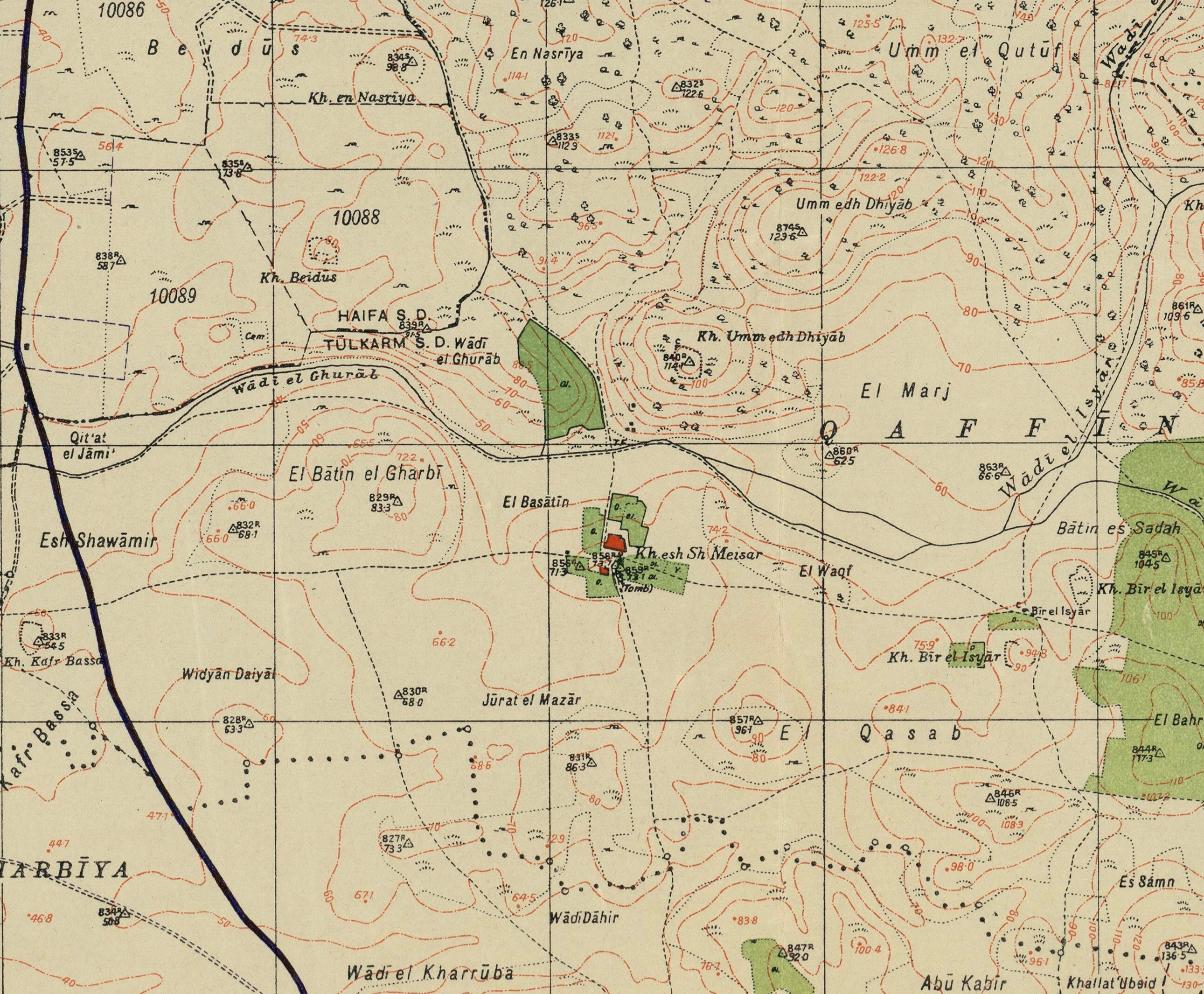
Meiser 1942 1:20,000

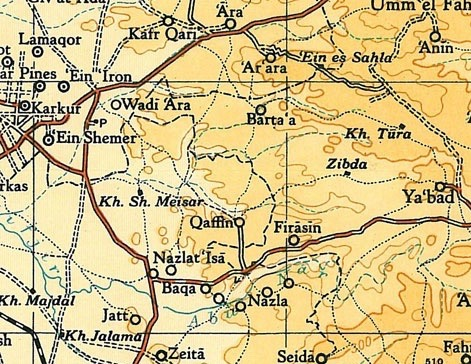
Meiser 1945 1:250,000

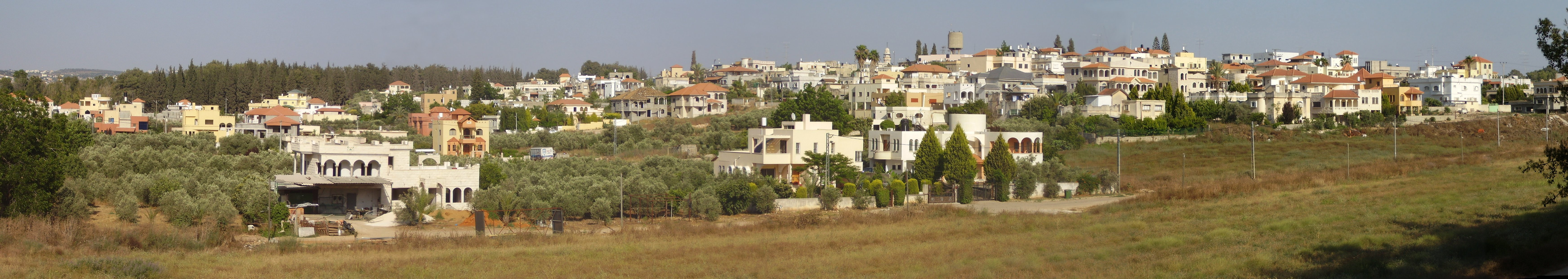
View of Meiser, 2006

== See also ==
- Arab localities in Israel
- Wadi Ara

== Bibliography ==
- Barron, J.B., ed. (1923). Palestine: Report and General Abstracts of the Census of 1922. Government of Palestine.
- Conder, C.R.; Kitchener, H.H. (1882). The Survey of Western Palestine: Memoirs of the Topography, Orography, Hydrography, and Archaeology. Vol. 2. London: Committee of the Palestine Exploration Fund.
- Dagot, Angelina (2007-01-10). "Horbat Mesar". Hadashot Arkheologiyot – Excavations and Surveys in Israel (119).
- Dauphin, C. (1998). La Palestine byzantine, Peuplement et Populations. BAR International Series 726 (in French). Vol. III : Catalogue. Oxford: Archeopress. ISBN 0-860549-05-4.
- Department of Statistics (1945). Village Statistics, April, 1945. Government of Palestine.
- Hadawi, S. (1970). Village Statistics of 1945: A Classification of Land and Area ownership in Palestine. Palestine Liberation Organization Research Center.
- Massarwa, Abdallah (2009-06-23). "Horbat Mesar (North)". Hadashot Arkheologiyot – Excavations and Surveys in Israel (121).
- Massarwa, Abdallah (2010-03-30). "Horbat Mesar". Hadashot Arkheologiyot – Excavations and Surveys in Israel (122).
- Palmer, E.H. (1881). The Survey of Western Palestine: Arabic and English Name Lists Collected During the Survey by Lieutenants Conder and Kitchener, R. E. Transliterated and Explained by E.H. Palmer. Committee of the Palestine Exploration Fund.
- Petersen, Andrew (2001). A Gazetteer of Buildings in Muslim Palestine (British Academy Monographs in Archaeology). Vol. 1. Oxford University Press. ISBN 978-0-19-727011-0.
- Sa‘id, Kareem (2008-12-18). "Horbat Mesar". Hadashot Arkheologiyot – Excavations and Surveys in Israel (120).
- Sa‘id, Kareem (2009-12-07). "Horbat Mesar". Hadashot Arkheologiyot – Excavations and Surveys in Israel (121).
- Tabar, Murad Anton; Gendelman, Peter (2013-12-31). "Horbat Mesar". Hadashot Arkheologiyot – Excavations and Surveys in Israel (125).
- Zertal, A. (2016). The Manasseh Hill Country Survey. Vol. 3. Boston: BRILL. ISBN 978-9004312302.
