= Ainata =

Ainata عيناتا
- Village
- Location within Lebanon
- Coordinates: 34.187°N 36.081°E
- Country: Lebanon
- Governorate: Baalbek-Hermel
- District: Baalbek
- Elevation: 1,620 m (5,310 ft)
- Highest elevation: 1,680 m (5,510 ft)
- Lowest elevation: 1,580 m (5,180 ft)

Population
  - Total: 3,000+
- Time zone: UTC+2 (EET)
  - Summer (DST): UTC+3 (EEST)
- Dialing code: +961

Ainata (Arabic: عيناتا, romanized: ʿAynātā), or sometimes known as Ainata-Al Ariz (Arabic: عيناتا الأرز, romanized: ʿAynātā al-ʾAriz), is a Lebanese village, 108 km from Beirut, located in Northern Lebanon, between the Bsharri District and the Baalbek District.

As of 1961, the village had about 800 inhabitants, mostly farmers.
