= Palestinian Information Center =

Palestinian news website

The Palestinian Information Center
- Website type: News
- Available in: 9 different languages
- Website: english.palinfo.com
- Commercial: No
- Launched: 1 January 1998
- Current status: active

The Palestinian Information Center (PIC; Arabic: المركز الفلسطيني للإعلام) is a Hamas-affiliated Palestinian news website and network that was established first in Arabic on 1 December 1997 and later in English on 1 January 1998.

== History ==
The Palestinian Information Center is a Palestinian news website and network that was established first in Arabic on 1 December 1997 and later in English on 1 January 1998. Other 7 languages followed. It is one of the most viewed website in Palestine, PIC aims to promote awareness about Palestine, the Palestinians and the Palestinian issue.

In June 2017, PIC, along with at least 10 other Palestinian news websites outside the West Bank, was blocked in the West Bank per an order by the Palestinian Authority's public prosecutor. PIC's Facebook page, which had close to 5 million followers, was taken down in October 2019, prompting protests using the hashtag #FBblocksPalestine.

== Affiliation ==
PIC is affiliated with the Palestinian political and military organization Hamas.
