= Qaffin =

- Municipality type B

Arabic transcription(s)
  - Arabic: قفّين
  - Latin: Qaffein (official)
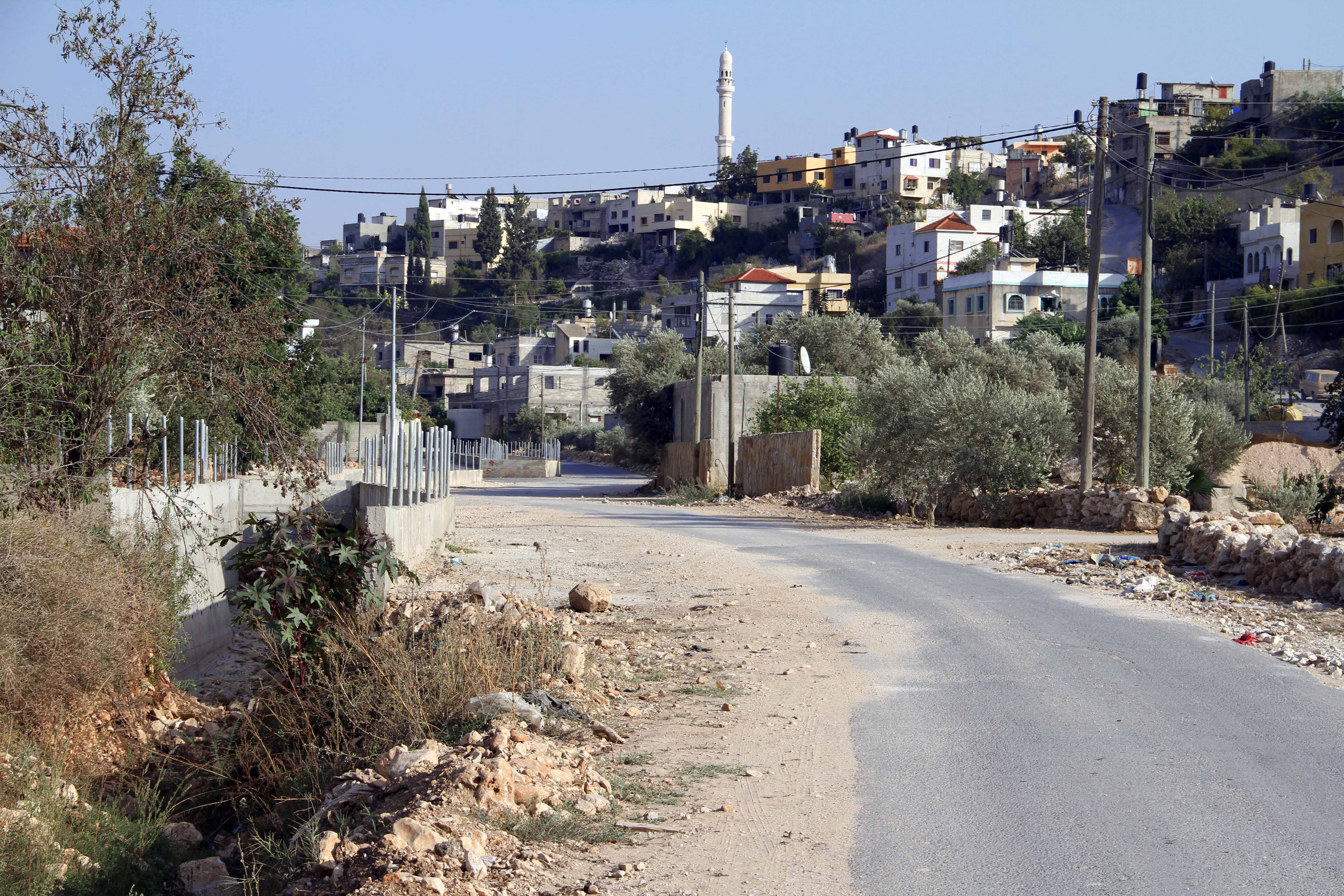
- Qaffin, 2011

- Location of Qaffin within Palestine
- Coordinates: 32°26′00″N 35°05′01″E
- Palestine grid: 158/204
- State: State of Palestine
- Governorate: Tulkarm

Government
  - Type: Municipality
  - Head of Municipality: Tayseer Harsha

Population (2017)
  - Total: 10,690
- Name meaning: Kuffin: a rugged hill

Qaffin (Arabic: قفّين) is a Palestinian town located 22 kilometers (14 mi) northeast of Tulkarm in the Tulkarm Governorate in the northwestern West Bank. The town is an agricultural town. According to the Palestinian Central Bureau of Statistics, its population was over 8,387 in 2007 and 10,690 in 2017. The built-up area of the town is 1,000 dunams.

== History ==
Ceramics from the Byzantine era have been found here.

In 1265, Qaffin was one of the estates given by Sultan Baibars to his followers after his victory over the Crusaders. Half of Qaffin was given to emir Rukn al-Din Baibars al-Mu'izzi.

=== Ottoman era ===
In 1517 the village was incorporated into the Ottoman Empire with the rest of Palestine. During the 16th and 17th centuries, Turabay Emirate (1517-1683), which encompassed also the Jezreel Valley, Haifa, Jenin, Beit She'an Valley, northern Jabal Nablus, Bilad al-Ruha/Ramot Menashe, and the northern part of the Sharon plain.

In the 1596 Ottoman tax-records a village named Qaffin appeared part of the nahiya (subdistrict) of Jenin under the liwa' (district) of Lajjun, with a population of 27 Muslim households. They paid taxes on a number of products, including wheat, barley, summer crops, olives, goats and beehives, in addition to occasional revenues and a press for olive oil or grape syrup; a total of 9,000 akçe.

In 1870/1871 (1288 AH), an Ottoman census listed the village in the nahiya of Shafa al-Gharby.

In 1882, the PEF's Survey of Western Palestine described the village, then named Kuffin as: "A good sized village on the low hills east of the Plain of Sharon, with a well on the south side. It has rock cut tombs, and a palm grows near the village."

=== British Mandate era ===
In the 1922 census of Palestine conducted by the British Mandate authorities, Kaffin had a population of 721 Muslims, increasing in the 1931 census to 1,085 Muslims, living in 255 houses.

In the 1945 statistics the population of Qaffin, (including Kh. el Aqqaba and Kh. esh Sheik Meisar) was 1,570 Muslims, and the land area was 23,755 dunams of land according to an official land and population survey. Of this, 5,863 dunams were plantations and irrigable land, 8,371 were used for cereals, while 40 dunams were built-up (urban) land.

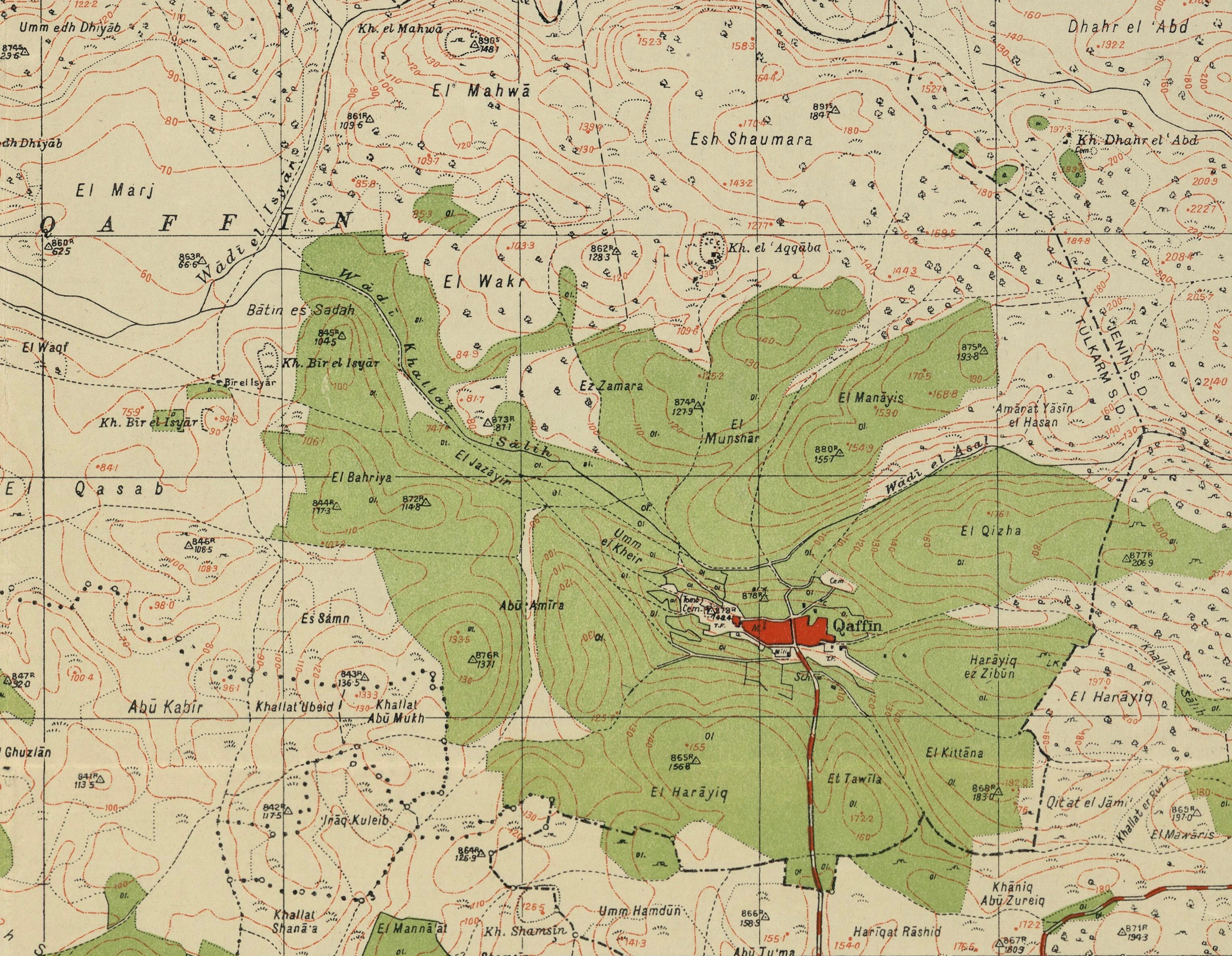
Qaffin 1942 1:20,000

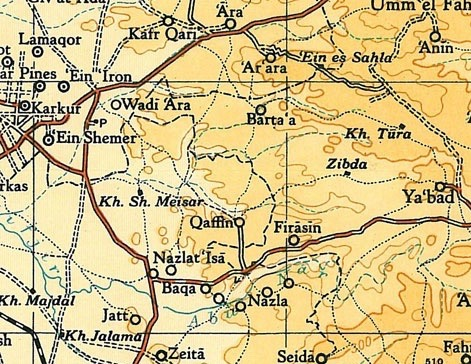
Qaffin 1945 1:250,000

=== Jordanian era ===
In the wake of the 1948 Arab–Israeli War, and after the 1949 Armistice Agreements, Qaffin came under Jordanian rule.

In 1961, the population of Qaffin was 2,457.

=== Post 1967 ===
Since the Six-Day War in 1967, Qaffin has been under Israeli occupation.

- On 7 February, Bader Harashi (20) had quarreled with an Israeli soldier at the Separation barrier just outside the village, where he was protesting the Trump Middle East peace plan. According to Palestinian reports, the soldier, apparently a Druze, left, came back some minutes later in a jeep, opened the door and shot Harashi dead. According to the IDF investigation, Harashi was shot dead when observed preparing to throw a Molotov cocktail.

== Demographics ==
The village's residents came from different places, including Hebron, 'Arura, the Ayalon Valley, and Bedouin communities.

== Bibliography ==
- Barron, J.B., ed. (1923). Palestine: Report and General Abstracts of the Census of 1922. Government of Palestine.
- Conder, C.R.; Kitchener, H.H. (1882). The Survey of Western Palestine: Memoirs of the Topography, Orography, Hydrography, and Archaeology. Vol. 2. London: Committee of the Palestine Exploration Fund.
- Dauphin, C. (1998). La Palestine byzantine, Peuplement et Populations. BAR International Series 726 (in French). Vol. III : Catalogue. Oxford: Archeopress. ISBN 0-860549-05-4.
- Government of Jordan, Department of Statistics (1964). First Census of Population and Housing. Volume I: Final Tables; General Characteristics of the Population (PDF).
- Government of Palestine, Department of Statistics (1945). Village Statistics, April, 1945.
- Hadawi, S. (1970). Village Statistics of 1945: A Classification of Land and Area ownership in Palestine. Palestine Liberation Organization Research Center.
- Hütteroth, W.-D.; Abdulfattah, K. (1977). Historical Geography of Palestine, Transjordan and Southern Syria in the Late 16th Century. Erlanger Geographische Arbeiten, Sonderband 5. Erlangen, Germany: Vorstand der Fränkischen Geographischen Gesellschaft. ISBN 3-920405-41-2.
- Ibn al-Furat (1971). J. Riley-Smith (ed.). Ayyubids, Mamluks and Crusaders: Selections from the "Tarikh Al-duwal Wal-muluk" of Ibn Al-Furat : the Text, the Translation. Vol. 2. Translation by Malcolm Cameron Lyons, Ursula Lyons. Cambridge: W. Heffer.
- Mills, E., ed. (1932). Census of Palestine 1931. Population of Villages, Towns and Administrative Areas. Jerusalem: Government of Palestine.
- Palmer, E.H. (1881). The Survey of Western Palestine: Arabic and English Name Lists Collected During the Survey by Lieutenants Conder and Kitchener, R. E. Transliterated and Explained by E.H. Palmer. Committee of the Palestine Exploration Fund.
- Zertal, A. (2016). The Manasseh Hill Country Survey. Vol. 3. Boston: BRILL. ISBN 978-9004312302.
