= Al-Maniya =

- Municipality type D (Village council)

Arabic transcription(s)
  - Arabic: المانیا
  - Latin: al-Minya (official)
- Interactive map of Al-Maniya
- Coordinates: 31°37′41″N 35°12′59″E
- State: State of Palestine
- Governorate: Bethlehem

Government
  - Type: Village council

Area
  - Total: 8.9 km^{2} (3.4 sq mi)

Population (2017)
  - Total: 1,346
  - Density: 150/km^{2} (390/sq mi)
- Name meaning: Kh. el Minyeh: the ruin of el Minyeh

Al-Maniya (Arabic: المانیا, also spelled al-Minya) is a Palestinian village in the Bethlehem Governorate in the central West Bank, 8.6 km southeast of Bethlehem and just south of Tuqu'. It incorporates the nearby hamlet of Wadi Muhammad within its jurisdiction. Most of the village, including much of its built-up area, is in Area C, giving the Israeli military full control over the village. It had a population of 1,346 in the 2017 census by the Palestinian Central Bureau of Statistics.

== History ==
The village was founded by immigrants from the southern town of Sa'ir near Hebron. According to local legend, its name derives from a cave in the vicinity that inhabited by a Byzantine-era queen named "Maniya." There is one mosque, the Palestine Mosque, in the village.

French explorer Victor Guérin passed by the place in 1863, and described it as having ruins "of little importance." In 1883, PEF's Survey of Western Palestine, it was described as having "foundations and ruined walls, with one or two caves, which are inhabited."

Al-Maniya has been under Israeli occupation since the 1967 Six-Day War.

In 1996, the Palestinian National Authority (PNA) established a seven-member village council to administer al-Maniya. The council members are appointed by the PNA. Principal families include al-Jabarin, al-Frookh, al-Kawazba, at-Tarwa and ash-Shalalda.

== Bibliography ==
- Conder, C.R.; Kitchener, H. H. (1883). The Survey of Western Palestine: Memoirs of the Topography, Orography, Hydrography, and Archaeology. Vol. 3. London: Committee of the Palestine Exploration Fund.
- Guérin, V. (1869). Description Géographique Historique et Archéologique de la Palestine (in French). Vol. 1: Judee, pt. 3. Paris: L'Imprimerie Nationale.
- Palmer, E. H. (1881). The Survey of Western Palestine: Arabic and English Name Lists Collected During the Survey by Lieutenants Conder and Kitchener, R. E. Transliterated and Explained by E.H. Palmer. Committee of the Palestine Exploration Fund.
