= Operation Five Stones =

2025 Israeli military action in the West Bank

- Part of the Israeli incursions in the West Bank during the Gaza war
Date	26 – 29 November 2025
Location	Tubas Governorate, Palestine
Result	Israeli withdrawal

Belligerents
Israel	Palestinian Islamic Jihad; Hamas

Units involved
Israel Defense Forces; Israeli Ground Forces; Judea and Samaria Division; Menashe Brigade; Samaria Brigade; 98th Division; Oz Brigade; Israeli Air Force	(Palestinian Islamic Jihad) (Hamas) Tubas Brigade

Casualties and losses
Unknown	Unknown

Operation Five Stones was a four-day Israeli military operation in the northern West Bank that lasted from 26 to 29 November 2025. It focused on combatting Palestinian militants in an area of Tubas Governorate dubbed the "Pentagon of Villages": Tubas, Tammun, the al-Fara'a camp, Aqaba, and Tayasir. While some sources described the operation as an extension of Israel's large-scale "Operation Iron Wall", the Israel Defense Forces (IDF) said it was not and referred to it as a new and distinct operation.

== Timeline ==
=== 26 November ===
A heavy deployment of Israeli forces in the Tubas Governorate began at midnight. Israel announced the start of the operation, which it described as "a broad counterterrorism operation" in the northern West Bank. Israeli forces sealed off large portions of the governorate, imposing a siege in the region and obstructing roads. Israeli helicopters firing at random were reported above Tubas. According to Tubas mayor Mahmoud Daraghmeh, this is the first time since the Second Intifada that military helicopters have been used in the city.

According to Ahmed al-Assad, governor of Tubas Governorate, Israeli forces encircled Tubas and established positions across several of the city's neighborhoods. He said the operation "looks to be a long one" and that Israeli forces were displacing and arresting residents.

Per Palestinian media, Tammun mayor Samir Basharat was among those detained by Israeli forces.

The Tubas Brigade said it had "confronted the incursion of the occupation forces", detonating explosives against IDF army vehicles.

=== 27 November ===
Israeli forces in the Tubas Governorate detained two journalists, a Palestinian and an Egyptian.

=== 28 November ===
The IDF withdrew from Tammun in the morning.

The IDF reported that 40 militants had been arrested, dozens of weapons had been confiscated, dozens of kilograms of potassium for explosives production had been seized, an "operational apartment" in Tammun was destroyed, and tens of thousands of shekels meant to finance militancy were confiscated.

The IDF also carried out mass detentions in the al-Fara'a camp. However, it withdrew from the camp that night.

Tubas Brigade militants targeted an Israeli foot patrol with an explosive device in a river valley of the Tayasir area.

=== 29 November ===
During the day, Israeli forces continued to operate in Tubas, Aqaba, and Tayasir. However, that evening, Israeli forces pulled out of Tubas Governorate, marking the conclusion of the operation.

== Reported human rights violations ==
Per IMEMC, Palestinian medical officials reported widespread abuse during Operation Five Stones. Nidal Odeh, director of ambulance and emergency services in Tubas, said paramedics treated 204 injuries caused by beatings, with 69 victims transferred to hospitals and the remainder treated in the field. Kamal Bani Odeh, director of the Palestinian Prisoners’ Society (PPS) in Tubas, confirmed that Israeli forces detained around 200 Palestinians for field interrogations. Most were later released, except for 10 individuals. It was additionally reported that Israeli forces carried out extensive home invasions, destroying property and subjecting residents to mistreatment.

== See also ==
- 2024 Palestinian Authority operation in Tubas
