= Khirbet al-Malih =

- Local Development Committee

Arabic transcription(s)
  - Arabic: خربة المالح
  - Latin: al-Malih (official); Khirbet el-Maleh (unofficial)
- Location of Khirbet al-Malih within Palestine
- Coordinates: 32°19′38.54″N 35°26′10.51″E
- State: State of Palestine
- Governorate: Tubas

Government
  - Type: Local Development Committee (from 2002)

Area
  - Total: 19.0 km^{2} (7.3 sq mi)

Population (2017)
  - Total: 354
  - Density: 18.6/km^{2} (48.3/sq mi)
- Name meaning: "Ruins of the Salty [Well]"

Khirbet al-Malih (Arabic: خربة المالح) is a Palestinian hamlet of about 350 people in the Tubas Governorate of the northeastern West Bank, located 10 kilometers (6.2 mi) east of Tubas.

== History ==
Khirbet al-Malih dates back to the Ottoman period of rule in Palestine when Turkish people first settled it. The current residents are from the Daraghmah clan who have dwelt in the area for 50 years. They came from nearby Tubas, and as well as Hebron in search of grazing and water as they were farmers and bred animals. Al-Malih means "salty" and the village's name is derives from the nearby al-Malih spring, which has salty water.

In 2002, a local development committee was appointed by the Local Authorities Minister of the Palestinian National Authority to govern Khirbet al-Malih composing of six members.

== Geography and climate ==
Khirbet al-Malih is situated at a moderate elevation of 32 meters (105 ft) above sea level. It borders the Jordan River in the east, the hamlet of al-Farisiya and the Jordan Valley to the north, and Tayasir and Khirbet al-'Atuf to the south.

The total area of Khirbet al-Malih village is roughly 19,000 dunams, which represents approximately 2.7% of the Tubas Governorate's land area. About 500 dunams are populated area, whilst 12,000 dunams are agricultural lands, 4,000 dunams are covered by forests and 3,500 dunams are areas confiscated by Israel.

It has a moderate climate; the mean annual rainfall is 294 millimeters (11.6 in), the average annual temperature is 21-22 °C and the average annual humidity is 53%.

== Demographics ==
In the 1997 census by the Palestinian Central Bureau of Statistics (PCBS), the total population of Khirbet al-Malih was 151 people, of which 77 were males and 74 females. The majority of the population (56.3%) are under the age of 20. There were 25 households resident in 27 housing units. According to the PCBS, Khirbet al-Malih had a population of 206 in mid-year 2006—an increase of 35.4% from 1997. The population further increased to 354 by 2017. The village is composed of four families: Darawsheh (60%), Zowahra (20%), Majedah (10%) and Bashareaat and Bani Audah (10%). There is no Palestinian refugee population in the village.

== Economy ==
The residents of Khirbet al-Malih are totally dependent on agricultural activities and 90% of the working inhabitants raise local animals and agricultural production is the main livelihood for them, forming the main source of income. Of the 6,160 dunams of land that is cultivated, 80% are field crops, while 20% are vegetables. Together with the hamlet of al-Farisiya, there are 485 heads of cattle, 430 goats, and 4,700 sheep.

After the Second Intifada that began in 2000, few (10%) work in the Israeli labor market because fewer workers have been given permits to work inside Israel. In 2000, the average household income was 1,500 NIS, but in 2005 it was 500 NIS, a decrease of 65%. According to mayor Arif Daraghmeh, Khirbet al-Malih's residents are not permitted to build permanent structures by the Israel Civil Administration, since the village is located in Area C. Despite living there for generations, Daraghmeh states the village regularly receives demolition orders, compelling them to live in tents or mudbrick housing unconnected to the water grid, while the Israeli settlers of the nearby moshav, Shadmot Mehola, dwell in a fenced community, with two-story homes, street lamps and playgrounds.
