= Wadi Sallah =

Wadi in Lebanon

- Wadi al-Far'a
- Location within Israel
- 32.293722°N 35.344461°E
- Type: Tell
- Cultures: Qaraoun culture
- Location: Israel

History
- Built: ca. 9300 BC
- Abandoned: ca. 6000 BC

Site notes
- Excavation dates: 1925-1926
- Archaeologists: Francis Turville-Petre
- Public access: yes

Wadi Sallah is a branch of the Wadi Fa'rah where a small cave is located in the Palestinian Tubas Governorate in the northeastern West Bank, located five kilometers southwest of Tubas. The cave was discovered and excavated by Francis Turville-Petre between 1925 and 1926. It contained an occupational Heavy Neolithic archaeological site of the Qaraoun culture. This culture was without pottery and typically used large axes for chopping lumber, cutting wood and felling trees such as the cedars of Lebanon in preparation for the domestication of emmer wheat and the Neolithic Revolution. Levels II and III of Turville-Petre's excavations revealed deposits of flints and potsherds. The pottery was later in date that the Heavy Neolithic material, which included heavy blades (picks, adzes, borers and flake scrapers), massive flake scrapers, and pieces with denticulation, all similar to those found at Shemouniyeh and Wadi Fa'rah. Several arrowheads were also found that were pressure flaked, generally tanged and leaf-shaped. One of these was of the Amuq 2 type.
