= Wadi Far'a =

Wadi Far'a may refer to:

- Wadi al-Far'a (river)
- Wadi al-Far'a, Palestinian village

== Name spelling ==
The Arabic name of Wadi al-Far'a is spelled on maps, in books and other sources in a wide array of ways. The Arabic article can be written as al-, el-, without hyphen, or it can be left out altogether. The name of the wadi can be spelled Far'a, Fa'ra, Far'ah, Fa'rah, Farah, Fari'a, or Fari'ah. With diacritics it is Wādī al-Fāri`ah.
