= Shemouniyeh =

Archaeological site in the West Bank

- Wadi al-Far'a
- Location within the West Bank
- 32.293722°N 35.344461°E
- Type: Tell
- Cultures: Qaraoun culture
- Location: West Bank

History
- Built: ca. 9300 BC
- Abandoned: ca. 6000 BC

Site notes
- Excavation dates: 1925–26
- Archaeologists: Francis Turville-Petre
- Public access: yes

Shemouniyeh is a Heavy Neolithic archaeological site of the Qaraoun culture in the Palestinian Tubas Governorate in the northeastern West Bank, located five kilometers southwest of Tubas. It is located on a plateau over the north of the Wadi Fa'rah, a little north-west of Deishun. Nearby is the Qaraoun culture occupational site of Wadi Sallah. Large numbers of massive flint tools and debris from this factory site were found and linked to this little known culture that was identified at over 25 sites in Lebanon. Tools found included picks, adzes, borers and flake scrapers.
