= Kardala =

- Municipality type D (Village council)

Arabic transcription(s)
  - Arabic: كردلة
- Location of Kardala within Palestine
- Coordinates: 32°22′46″N 35°29′32″E
- State: State of Palestine
- Governorate: Tubas

Government
  - Type: Village council

Population (2024)
  - Total: 234

Kardala (Arabic: كردلة) is a Palestinian hamlet located in the Tubas Governorate, 13 kilometers northeast of Tubas adjacent to Bardala in the west and Ein al-Beida in the east. It had a population of 234 inhabitants in 2024. It is located on the eastern foothills of the northern Jordan Valley on a fertile plain of land. It is situated at a low elevation of -99 meters below sea level.

Kardala was established in the 1930s. The founders were members of the AL-FOQAHA clan from Tubas who worked as farmers and raised livestock. After the 1948-Arab Israeli War, the A’Hashah family from the Gaza area migrated here as Palestinian refugees. Despite being under the population limit, Kardala is governed by a village council, although instead of consisting of seven members, the council is made up of three members.

Nearly all working residents, spend their livelihoods in agriculture. Of the hamlet's 800 dunams, 250 are arable lands. The built-up area of the village is 30 dunams. Working residents comprise 66% of the population, of which women represent 31%. The average income is 1,000 NIS. There is one Primary school in the village, however, a health clinic is being built. About 85% the residents are literate and attend secondary schools in Bardala. Most university students go to the al-Quds Open University campus in Tubas and to An-Najah National University in Nablus .
