= Tubas =

Tubas is the plural of tuba.

It can also refer to:

- Tubas (city) in Palestine
- Tubas Governorate in Palestine
