= Ras al-Far'a =

- Municipality type D (Village council)

Arabic transcription(s)
- Location of Ras al-Far'a within Palestine
- Coordinates: 32°17′15″N 35°19′53″E
- State: State of Palestine
- Governorate: Tubas

Government
  - Type: Village council

Population (2017)
  - Total: 1,250

Ras al-Far'a (Arabic: راس الفارعة) is a Palestinian town in the Tubas Governorate in the Northern area of the West Bank, located 5 kilometers South west of Tubas. According to the Palestinian Central Bureau of Statistics, the town had a population of over 701 inhabitants in mid-year 2006 and 1,250 by 2017. The healthcare facilities for Ras al-Far'a are based in Tammun and the nearby refugee camp of al-Far'a.

== See also ==
- Far'a refugee camp
- Wadi al-Far'a village
- Wadi al-Far'a (river)
