= Souf (disambiguation) =

Souf may refer to:

- Souf, a town in Jerash Governorate, Jordan
- Souf Camp, a Palestinian refugee camp situated near the town of Souf, Jordan
- Souf (singer), real name Soufiene Nouhi, Moroccan-French singer
- Souf, a north eastern Algerian city near the Tunisian borders.

== See also ==
- Sufi (disambiguation)
