= Tayasir =

Palestinian village in Tubas Governorate, West Bank

- Municipality type D (Village council)

Arabic transcription(s)
  - Arabic: تياسير
  - Latin: Tiaseer (official)
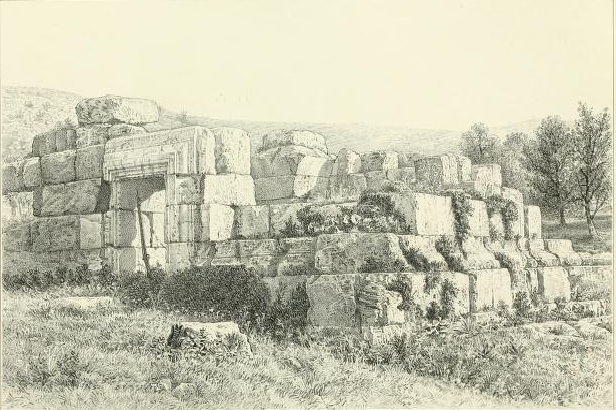
- Sketch of el-Kusr in Tayasir, 1882

- Location of Tayasir within Palestine
- Coordinates: 32°20′26″N 35°23′49″E
- Palestine grid: 187/194
- Authority: Palestine
- Governorate: Tubas

Government
  - Type: Village council (from 1997)
  - Head of Municipality: Akram Dabaq

Area
  - Total: 26.0 km^{2} (10.0 sq mi)

Population (2017)
  - Total: 2,878
  - Density: 111/km^{2} (287/sq mi)

Tayasir (Arabic: تياسير, also spelled Tiaseer) is a Palestinian village in the Tubas Governorate of the Palestinian Authority, in the northern West Bank. It is located 3 kilometers northeast of Tubas and 22 kilometers northeast of Nablus. Nearby localities include al-Aqabah to the east, al-Bikai'a to the northeast, Salhab to the north, 'Aqqaba to the west and ath-Thaghra to the southwest. According to the Palestinian Central Bureau of Statistics (PCBS), Tayasir had a population of 2,489 in 2007 and a population of 2,878 by 2017.

== History ==
Settlement in Tayasir is believed to date back to the Canaanite era in Palestine. The name may come from the Canaanite word Asheer meaning "pleasure" or "happiness". Archaeological remains in the village include an Ancient Roman palace, an olive press, several grottoes and an old mosque. Pottery remains have been unearthed from the Middle Bronze Age, IA, early and late Roman period. An ancient road passed through the village. It appears to have been called Asher by the Bordeaux Pilgrim, in 333–334 CE.

Medieval Arab geographer al-Muqaddasi, writing in the late 10th century CE, referred to the village as "Ta'asir", describing it as a place equally far from Nablus and Beisan.

In 1500, the Jabir and Taleb families settled there due to its strategic location and arable land.

=== Ottoman era ===
In 1596 it appeared in Ottoman tax registers as "Tayasir", a village in the nahiya of Jabal Sami, part of the Nablus Sanjak, with a population of 39 households and 9 bachelors, all Muslim. They paid a fixed tax-rate of 33,3 % on agricultural products, including wheat, barley, summer crops, olive trees, occasional revenues, goats, beehives and a press for olives or grapes; a total of 9,462 akçe.

A building to the south of Tayasir, named el-Kusr, possibly a tomb, was first noted in 1869 and surveyed in 1874. French explorer Victor Guérin also explored the village in the same period.

In 1877 Lieutenant Kitchener, of the Palestine Exploration Fund survey team, reported the village deserted "owing to the heavy demands for taxes and conscription," while in 1881 Tayasir was described as a small village in a secluded and fertile valley, with good soil and arable land. To the south of the village there were old olive trees. The villagers cultivated the soil as far east as Wady Maleh, and had also good land near Yarza. Conder and Kitchener speculated that this village may have been the ancient site of the biblical Tirzah.

In 1900 landlord Hassan Hamad bought the majority of Tayasir's lands due to the village residents' monetary debt to him. Thirty years later, most of the land was purchased by al-Batriyarkia al-Latinyah (Latin Patriarchate). Israel attempted to purchase the land following their occupation of the West Bank in 1967 but the Patriarchate refused too do so; in return they could not sell it to any of the residents of the village.

=== British Mandate of Palestine ===
In the 1922 census of Palestine, conducted by the British Mandate authorities, Tayasir (called: Tiasir") had a population of 146 Muslims increasing in the 1931 census to 192 inhabitants, all Muslim, except for 5 Christians, with 36 occupied houses.

In the 1945 statistics the population was 260 Muslims, with 23,258 dunams of land, according to an official land and population survey. Of this, 763 dunams were used for plantations and irrigable land, 5,315 dunams for cereals, while 29 dunams were built-up (urban) land.

=== Jordanian era ===
In the wake of the 1948 Arab–Israeli War, and after the 1949 Armistice Agreements, Tayasir came under Jordanian rule.

In 1961, the population had reached 487.

=== Post 1967 ===
Since the Six-Day War in 1967, Tayasir has been under Israeli occupation.

Following the 1993 Oslo Accords, Tayasir came under the jurisdiction of the Palestinian National Authority (PNA) and later became a village council in 1997. By 2007, the council consisted of 11 members and was headed by Akram Dabaq.

== Demographics ==
In the 1922 census of Palestine, conducted by the British Mandate authorities, Tayasir (called: Tiasir") had a population of 146, all Muslim. That rose to 192 inhabitants, all Muslim, except for 5 Christians, with 36 occupied houses at the time of the 1931 census. In Sami Hadawi's land and population survey in 1945, Tayasir's population was 260 and this figure nearly doubled in 1961, reaching 487. The Israel Central Bureau of Statistics, projected a population of 1,200 in 1987. In the Palestinian Central Bureau of Statistics' (PCBS) first official census in 1997, Tayasir had a population of 1,753 inhabitants. According to the 2007 census by the PCBS, the village's population was 2,489.

In the 1997 census, males constituted 50.6% of the population while females comprised 49.4%. Tayasir represents 5% of the Tubas Governorate's total population. Seven families make-up the majority of the village residents: Debik (17%), Abu Muhsen (15%), Wahdan (15%), Sbah (15%), Jabir (11%), Taleb (8%) and Abd al-Rasaq (7%). Other smaller families comprise 14% of the population.

Many residents of Tayasir have their origin in Bedouins who transitioned to a settled lifestyle and became fellahin (peasants), with some originating from Tubas.

== Economy and land use ==
Tayasir's total land area amounts to about 26,000 dunams, of which roughly 500 make up the village's "built-up" area. About 5,000 dunams are classified as arable land, of which 3,545 are cultivated, mostly with field crops and fruit trees. The Israeli authorities have confiscated 15,875 dunams for security reasons and military use.

Agriculture is the largest economic sector, accounting for 82% of the active labor force. The second largest sector is the Israeli labor market accounting for 10% of workers. Between 2002 and 2006, the average household income dropped by 60% largely due to measures implemented by Israel as a result of the Second Intifada which began in 2000. In 2007 the PCBS recorded that there were 49 business establishments in Tayasir. According to ARIJ, these included 22 retail and grocery stores, two restaurants and one government-run health clinic. Most services are provided by nearby Tubas.

== Bibliography ==
- Barron, J.B., ed. (1923). Palestine: Report and General Abstracts of the Census of 1922. Government of Palestine.
- Bordeaux Pilgrim (1887). Initiary from Bordeaux to Jerusalem in 333- 334 CE. London: Palestine Pilgrims' Text Society.
- Conder, C.R.; Kitchener, H.H. (1882). The Survey of Western Palestine: Memoirs of the Topography, Orography, Hydrography, and Archaeology. Vol. 2. London: Committee of the Palestine Exploration Fund.
- Dauphin, C. (1998). La Palestine byzantine, Peuplement et Populations. BAR International Series 726 (in French). Vol. III : Catalogue. Oxford: Archeopress. ISBN 0-860549-05-4.
- Government of Jordan, Department of Statistics (1964). First Census of Population and Housing. Volume I: Final Tables; General Characteristics of the Population (PDF).
- Government of Palestine, Department of Statistics (1945). Village Statistics, April, 1945.
- Guerin, V. (1875). Description Géographique, Historique et Archéologique de la Palestine. Vo2; Samarie, pt 2.
- Hadawi, S. (1970). Village Statistics of 1945: A Classification of Land and Area ownership in Palestine. Palestine Liberation Organization Research Center.
- Hütteroth, W.-D.; Abdulfattah, K. (1977). Historical Geography of Palestine, Transjordan and Southern Syria in the Late 16th Century. Erlanger Geographische Arbeiten, Sonderband 5. Erlangen, Germany: Vorstand der Fränkischen Geographischen Gesellschaft. ISBN 3-920405-41-2.
- Kitchener, H. (1878). "Journal of the Survey". Quarterly Statement - Palestine Exploration Fund. 9: 62–67.
- Le Strange, G. (1890). Palestine Under the Moslems: A Description of Syria and the Holy Land from A.D. 650 to 1500. Committee of the Palestine Exploration Fund.
- Macalister, R.A. Stewart (1907). "Diary of a visit to Safad". Quarterly Statement - Palestine Exploration Fund. 39: 91–130. (p. 95 ff.)
- Mills, E., ed. (1932). Census of Palestine 1931. Population of Villages, Towns and Administrative Areas. Jerusalem: Government of Palestine.
- Mukaddasi (1886). Description of Syria, including Palestine. London: Palestine Pilgrims' Text Society.
- Palmer, E.H. (1881). The Survey of Western Palestine: Arabic and English Name Lists Collected During the Survey by Lieutenants Conder and Kitchener, R. E. Transliterated and Explained by E.H. Palmer. Committee of the Palestine Exploration Fund.
- Wilson, C.W. (1869). "Remains of Tombs in Palestine". Quarterly Statement - Palestine Exploration Fund. 1: 66–71.
- Zertal, A. (2007). The Manasseh Hill Country Survey. Vol. 2. Boston: BRILL. ISBN 978-9004163690.
