= Killing of members of the Bani Odeh family =

2026 shooting in the West Bank

Killing of Bani Odeh family
- Part of the Operation Iron Wall and Israeli incursions in the West Bank during the Gaza war
- Location: Tammun, Palestine
- Date: 15 March 2026; 1:30 a.m. (UTC+3)
- Attack type: Mass shooting
- Deaths: 4
- Injuries: 2
- Perpetrator: Israel Defense Forces

Four members of the Bani Odeh family were killed on 15 March 2026 when the Israel Defense Forces (IDF) opened fire on their car in Tammun in the West Bank. Ali Khaled Bani Odeh, 37, his wife Waad Othman Bani Odeh, 35, and their sons Othman, 7, and Mohammed, 5 were killed. Two other sons, Khaled,12, and Mustafa, 8, were injured by shrapnel.

The two survivors have said that the IDF opened fire while the car was stationary, while Israeli officials claimed that the car was accelerating towards them.

== Background ==
Israeli forces act with near total impunity in the occupied West Bank and target Palestinians. According Israeli human rights group Yesh Din, less than 1% of the 2,427 complaints between 2016 and 2024 alleging wrongdoing had resulted in indictment and that no attack on Palestinians by Israeli forces has led to a homicide indictment since 2019. Since then more than 1,400 Palestinians, including at least 320 children and 30 women, have been killed by Israeli forces, according to UN figures. Israeli settlers have killed at least 44 other Palestinians.

Violence in the West Bank has increased sharply since the October 7 attacks and the subsequent Gaza war. 1,064 Palestinians, including at least 231 children, had been killed between 7 October 2023 and 8 March 2026, according to the United Nations Office for the Coordination of Humanitarian Affairs (OCHA). Although movement in Israeli-occupied West Bank has been heavily restricted since the start of the Iran war, violence against Palestinians has surged according to the UN and Palestinian authorities. On 14 March 2026, Israeli settlers shot dead 28 year-old Amir Moatasem Odeh and stabbed his father Moatasem Awda in Qusra, south of Nablus.

Tammun is a town deep inside territory controlled by the Palestinian Authority and far from areas of conflict with Israeli settlers. It is one of several towns that had been occupied by the IDF for more than a year since they launched an offensive against militants in the northern West Bank.

== Shooting ==
Ali Bani Odeh had been working in construction in Israel for four and half months before returning home to Tammun on 13 March 2026 to spend the last days of Ramadan with his family. On the night of 14 March, Bani Odeh's sons persuaded him to take his family out for a drive. The family intended to buy new clothes for Eid al-Fitr as well as some sweets as the day's fasting had ended. It is common for families to stay up late during Ramadan when adults fast during daylight.

The family bought some doughnuts in Tubas for consumption later but when they arrived at the clothes shop in Nablus they found it closed. They decided to return home as it was already past midnight. Ali Bani Odeh was driving while his wife Waad was in the front passenger seat with their son Othman (7), who was blind and unable to walk or feed himself, on her lap. Their three other sons - Khaled (11), Mustafa (8) and Mohammed (5) - were in the back.

According to testimony from Khaled and Mustafa, they were just a few minutes from home when their mother asked their father to pull over and take Othman, as she wanted to get something from her bag. At that moment, laser pointers started shining into the family car from all directions. Their mother started screaming and crying while their father recited the Shahada, an Islamic declaration of faith which Muslims cite when facing death. The car was then hit by a volley of gunfire. According to Defence for Children International the Israelis started shooting without warning from around 50m away at about 1.30 a.m. and that the shooting lasted for three minutes.

Ali Bani Odeh, Waad, Othman and Mohammed were all shot dead. They all had gunshots to the face and head whilst Ali also had shots in the chest and left hand. Both parents and one of the children had had part of their heads blown off, according to the ambulance crew who attended the victims. All six victims were taken to the Turkish Public Hospital in Tubas. Khaled and Mustafa had minor injuries to their eyes and head from shrapnel.

According to Khaled, after the gunfire stopped he opened the door and yelled "please help me" but soldiers told him to shut up. A soldier dragged him out of the car by his hair and threw him to the ground before beating him on the head and legs. An Arabic-speaking soldier spoke kindly to Khaled, referring to him as "Habibi", before kicking him repeatedly. He was taunted about the killing of his family as one Israeli said “we killed dogs”, and aggressively questioned about whether anyone else had been in the car. When Khaled told the soldiers that he and Mustafa needed the bathroom, they pointed towards a Palestinian ambulance 100m away. A soldier then opened a door of the car as he passed, revealing the dead bodies of his father and mother.

Eyewitnesses accounts and video posted on social media showed the IDF towing the Bani Odeh's car away after the shooting. Video also showed the scene of shooting riddled with bullets and blood stains.

== Aftermath ==
The IDF and Israel Police issued a statement on 15 March 2026 that border police and soldiers were on a mission in Tammun to arrest suspected terrorists when a vehicle started accelerating towards them and, sensing danger, they responded by shooting. The circumstances of the incident were being investigated according to the statement. A border police spokesman said that they had used flash lights and laser pointers to signal the vehicle to stop but it kept moving towards them.

Palestinian officials said that the Israelis only informed them of the mission in Tammun after it had been carried out. They were told that the mission was to arrest a youth suspected of making explosive devices and another of inciting violence against Israelis on social media. The Palestinian Red Crescent said that Israeli forces had initially prevented their ambulance from reaching the victims of the shooting and that they had been ordered to leave the area. They were allowed to attend to the family after 30 minutes. Tammun's mayor Sameer Basharat said the shooting had occurred in the centre of Tammun where the IDF had a daily presence.

A local resident who witnessed the shooting said that the family's car turned left into his street, which faces uphill and is close a bend, in the centre of the town and had come to a complete halt prior to any shots being fired. He did not hear any warnings or warning shots from the Israelis. Relatives of the victims have stated that the Israelis were not uniform and were in Palestinian registered vehicles. One relative said the shooting showed that "Palestinian lives have no value".

Israeli human rights group B'Tselem said that the family's car was ridden with bullets but there was "no effective mechanism...to hold those responsible to account". The Haaretz newspaper said that responsibility for the shooting lies with the Israelis and that the perceived danger was no excuse for the level of violence directed against a "car innocently carrying a father, mother and four children on their way home". Yair Lapid, leader of the opposition Yesh Atid party, called on the Israeli government to apologise for the shooting, saying that "a seven-year-old boy with special needs should not die in the wars of adults".

Amnesty International issued a statement condemning the "horrific incident" which it said was part of "a pattern of increasing use of deadly force by Israeli forces against Palestinians". The statement said that initial information and testimonies suggested that shooting amounted to extrajudicial executions. The Office of the United Nations High Commissioner for Human Rights also condemned the shooting, saying that raised "serious concerns about a persistent trend of unlawful killings of Palestinians with impunity".

== See also ==
- Israeli war crimes in the Gaza war
- List of massacres in Palestine
- Outline of the Gaza war
