= Kashda =

Palestinian village in Tubas Governorate

Khirbet Kishda خربة كشدة
- Archaeological site / Ruin
- Interactive map of Khirbet Kishda
- Coordinates: 32°18′25″N 35°20′45″E
- Country: West Bank
- Governorate: Tubas Governorate
- Elevation: 335 m (1,099 ft)

Khirbet Kishda (also Khirbet Keshda) is a village in Palestine in the Tubas Governorate of the West Bank. Situated 4 kilometers southwest of the city of Tubas, it is considered one of its dependencies.

== Geography ==
The site sits 335 meters above sea level and overlooks the surrounding valleys.

== Archaeology ==
Archaeological surveys of Khirbet Kishda recovered pottery from the Byzantine, Medieval (Islamic), and Ottoman periods.

Among the surviving ruins is a stone tower with a domed ceiling, probably dating to the eighteenth or nineteenth centuries. Built of dressed stone, it preserves voussoirs above the entrance and a domed roof.

The Reḥov mosaic inscription from the lists the site as Kephar Kasadiya (כפר כסדיה) among the Jewish settlements of the Sebaste district, whose inhabitants were exempt from agricultural laws governing produce because of the territory’s ambiguous status.

== Modern history ==
In 2021, the Palestinian Health Ministry opened a treatment facility for both intensive and regular Covid-19 patients at Kishda.

In January 2025, the village was the target of an IDF raid.
