= Tammun =

- Municipality type B

Arabic transcription(s)
  - Arabic: طمّون
  - Latin: Tamoun (official); Tamon (unofficial)
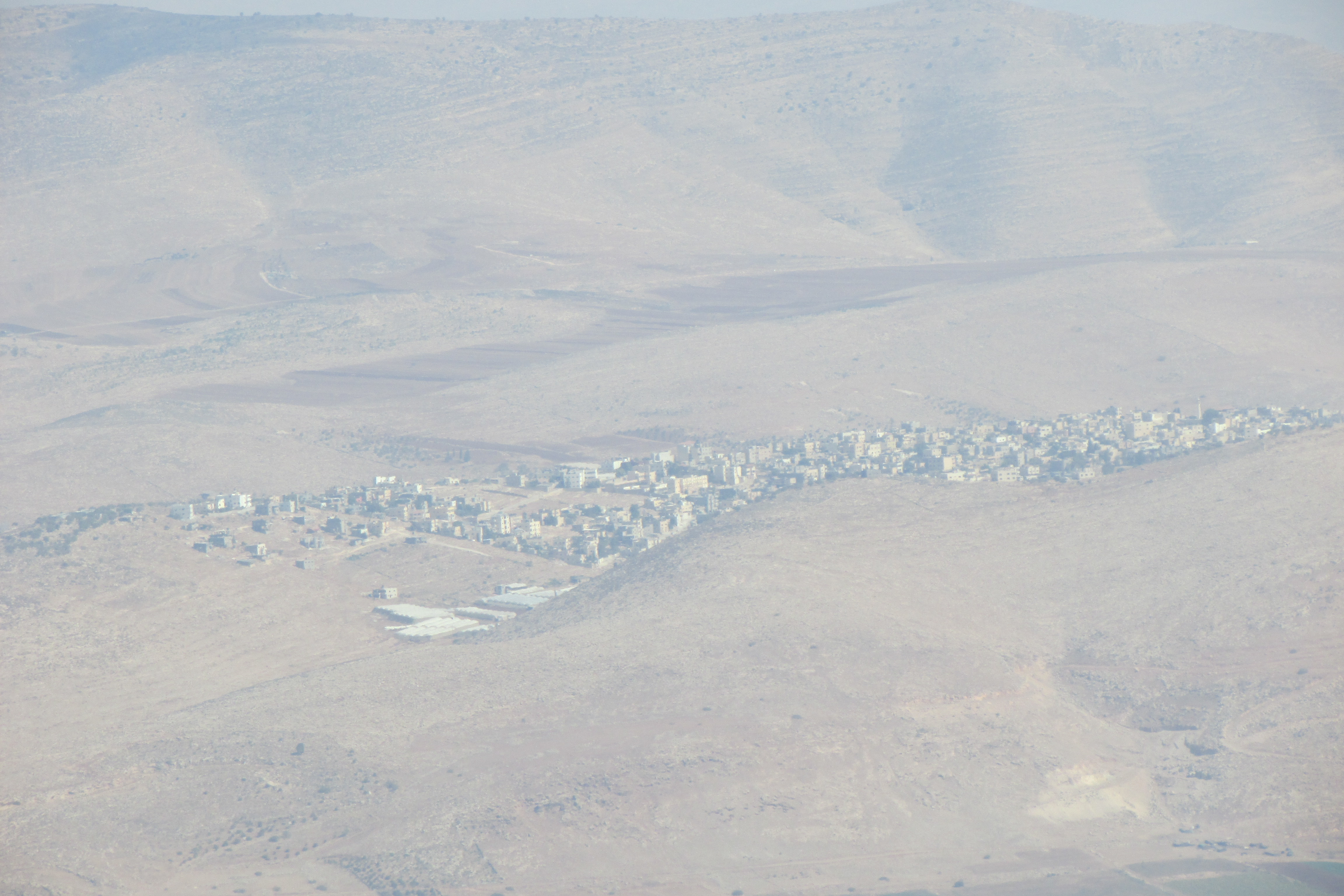
- Tammun

- Location of Tammun within Palestine
- Coordinates: 32°17′03″N 35°23′09″E
- Palestine grid: 186/187
- State: State of Palestine
- Governorate: Tubas
- Founded: 15th century

Government
  - Type: Municipality (from 1997)
  - Head of Municipality: Muhammad Ahmad Bsharat

Area
  - Total: 81.0 km^{2} (31.3 sq mi)

Population (2017)
  - Total: 13,117
  - Density: 162/km^{2} (419/sq mi)
- Name meaning: "Quiet", or "To Overflow"

Tammun (Arabic: طمّون, romanized: Ṭammūn) is a Palestinian town in the Tubas Governorate of the State of Palestine, located 13 kilometers northeast of Nablus and five kilometers south of Tubas in the northeastern West Bank. Tammun had a population of approximately 10,795 inhabitants in 2007 and 13,117 by 2017.

== Etymology ==
The town's name derives from the Arabic word tammen, meaning "quiet".

van de Velde suggested in 1854 that Tammun was the Biblical town of Tabbath in Ephraim; (see Jgs 7:22); however, Tabbath is now identified with a site in Jordan.

== History ==
=== Ottoman period ===
Tammun's modern history dates from the 15th century. The village was founded by a group of people from the Arabian Peninsula seeking to find a safe location in Palestine with a view of other nearby localities. In 1596 it appeared in the Ottoman tax registers as "Tammun", in the nahiya of Jabal Sami in the liwa of Nablus. It had a population of 15 households and 3 bachelors, all Muslim. The villagers paid a fixed tax rate of 33.3% on wheat, barley, summer crops, olive trees, occasional revenues, goats and beehives; a total of 5,450 akçe.

Over the past four centuries, people from the towns of Kafr Qaddum and Halhul have settled in the village. A small portion of the residents came from Egypt.

In 1882, the PEF's Survey of Western Palestine described Tammun as "A good-sized village at the foot of the mountain, with open ground to the north. The village stands high, with olives to the south.

=== British Mandate ===
In the 1922 census of Palestine, conducted by the British Mandate authorities, Tammun had a population of 1,345, all Muslim. This had increased in the 1931 census of Palestine, when Tammun, (including Atuf), had 316 occupied houses and a population of 1,599, again all Muslim.

In the 1945 statistics, the population was 2,070 Muslims, with 98,080 dunams of land, according to an official land and population survey. 393 dunams were used for plantations and irrigable land, 33,181 dunams for cereals, while 157 dunams were built-up (urban) land.

=== Jordanian period ===
In the wake of the 1948 Arab–Israeli War, and after the 1949 Armistice Agreements, Tammun came under Jordanian rule. It was annexed by Jordan in 1950.

The Jordanian census of 1961 found 2,593 inhabitants in Tammun.

=== 1967 war and aftermath ===
Since the Six-Day War in 1967, Tammun has been under Israeli occupation.

In 2023, the town was stormed by the IDF.

The Palestinian Islamic Jihad reported to have attacked Israeli forces during an IDF raid in Tammun on 1 January 2025.

On January 29, 2025, during Operation Iron Wall at least 10 Palestinians were killed and several others wounded in an Israeli airstrike by the IDF.

On March 30, 2025, a 22-year-old Palestinian man was shot dead by undercover Israeli forces in a raid in the town. Four members of the Bani Odeh family were shot dead by the Israeli military in the town on March 15, 2026.

== Geography and climate ==
Tammun stands at an elevation of 332 meters above sea level. It is five kilometers south of Tubas, twenty-three kilometers northeast of Nablus, and bordered by Far'a and Wadi al-Far'a to the west and an-Naseriya to the south.

The town's total land area is about 81,000 dunams, accounting for more than 15% of the Tubas Governorate's jurisdiction. About 1,519 dunams are designated as 'built up' area, while 79,481 dunams are used for agricultural purposes, are covered by forests or are classified as closed-off areas controlled by the Israel Defense Forces.

The average temperature in Tammun is 20 degrees Celsius. The town receives an average annual rainfall of 331 millimeters and the average humidity rate is 57%.

== Demographics ==
According to the 1997 census by the Palestinian Central Bureau of Statistics (PCBS), Tammun had a population of 7,640, of whom 3,771 were males and 3,869 were females. The age distribution of the town's inhabitants was 45% under the age of 15, 49.9% between the ages of 15 and 4.6% were above the age of 65.

According to the PCBS, Tammun had a population of 10,795 inhabitants in the 2007 census. The growth of inhabitants from 1997 and 2005 was 32.1%. Its population constituted over 21% of the entire population of the Tubas Governorate, making it the second largest city after Tubas. Tammun's residents generally are from two Arab families: Bani Odeh and Bsharat.

== Economy ==
Prior to the 1967 Six-Day War, Tammun's residents mostly relied on farming and raising livestock. Since 1967 to the First Intifada, work has shifted to Israel where many laborers were employed. The Palestinian National Authority, which gained civil control over Tammun in 1995, has provided more job opportunities in the public sector and trade. After the outbreak of the Second Intifada in 2000, labor shifted once again to agriculture.

Currently, 50% work in agriculture, 35% work in the Israeli labor market, 10% in services, 2% in construction and 3% in trade. In 2006, there were 212 shops, eight restaurants, a wheat mill, a pickle factory and other industries such as cheese and jam production. In 1997, Tammun's labor force made up 67% of the town's population. However, 66.3% were non-economically active. Women constituted 34% of the labor force. Tammun's average income dropped from 1,500 NIS before 2000 to 600 NIS in 2004 — a decrease of 60%.

Tammun has a total of 25,000 dunams of cultivated land, of which 4,166 are grown with fruit orchards, 3,560 for field crops, 600 dunams for vegetables and 120 are used for greenhouses. According to the Palestinian Ministry of Agriculture, Tammun produces five tonnes of olives, 3,500 tonnes of vegetables and 2,500 tonnes of field crops per annum. Around 10% of Tammun's residents own livestock which consists of 137 herds of cattle, 480 goats, 5,250 sheep, 37,000 poultry and 138 beehives for honey.

== Government ==
Tammun was transferred to the Palestinian National Authority on November 13, 1995, and was originally governed by a village council. Since 1997, Tammun has been governed by a municipal council with fifteen elected members, including the mayor. The municipality is in charge of Tammun's administration, planning and development, social services, infrastructural maintenance, utilities, solid waste collection and issuing of building licenses. In the 2005 Palestinian municipal elections, Muhammad Ahmad Bsharat was elected mayor.

== Education ==
In 1997, 84.3% of Tammun's population over the age of 10 was literate. Women made up 80% of the illiterate residents. About 17% of the population over the age of 18 had completed their secondary and high school education, 20% completed primary and secondary education and 27.2% completed just their primary education.

There are seven schools and six kindergartens in the town, all administered by the Education Ministry of the Palestinian National Authority. Of the seven schools, three were all-male schools, two were all women and two were co-ed. In 2004–05, 3,091 students were enrolled in these schools. There was a total of 395 children in Tammun's kindergartens.

== Bibliography ==
- Barron, J. B., ed. (1923). Palestine: Report and General Abstracts of the Census of 1922. Government of Palestine.
- Conder, C.R.; Kitchener, H.H. (1882). The Survey of Western Palestine: Memoirs of the Topography, Orography, Hydrography, and Archaeology. Vol. 2. London: Committee of the Palestine Exploration Fund.
- Government of Jordan, Department of Statistics (1964). First Census of Population and Housing. Volume I: Final Tables; General Characteristics of the Population (PDF).
- Government of Palestine, Department of Statistics (1945). Village Statistics, April, 1945.
- Guérin, V. (1875). Description Géographique Historique et Archéologique de la Palestine (in French). Vol. 2: Samarie, pt. 2. Paris: L'Imprimerie Nationale.
- Hadawi, S. (1970). Village Statistics of 1945: A Classification of Land and Area ownership in Palestine. Palestine Liberation Organization Research Center.
- Hütteroth, W.-D.; Abdulfattah, K. (1977). Historical Geography of Palestine, Transjordan and Southern Syria in the Late 16th Century. Erlanger Geographische Arbeiten, Sonderband 5. Erlangen, Germany: Vorstand der Fränkischen Geographischen Gesellschaft. ISBN 3-920405-41-2.
- Mills, E., ed. (1932). Census of Palestine 1931. Population of Villages, Towns and Administrative Areas. Jerusalem: Government of Palestine.
- Palmer, E.H. (1881). The Survey of Western Palestine: Arabic and English Name Lists Collected During the Survey by Lieutenants Conder and Kitchener, R. E. Transliterated and Explained by E.H. Palmer. Committee of the Palestine Exploration Fund.
- Velde, van de, C.W.M. (1854). Narrative of a journey through Syria and Palestine in 1851 and 1852. Vol. 2. William Blackwood and son.
