= Wadi al-Far'a (river) =

River in Palestine

Wadi al-Far'a Nahal Tirzah
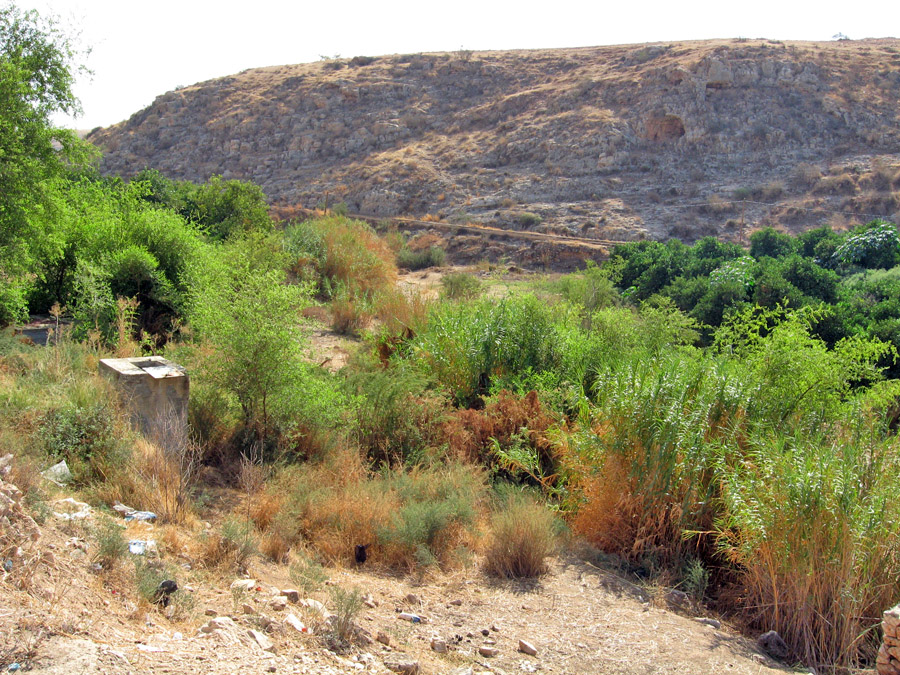

Location
- Country: West Bank

Physical characteristics
- Source
  - location: Yasid/Talluza, West Bank
  - coordinates: 32°16′44.44″N 35°16′47.59″E
- Mouth: Jordan River ESE of Yafit
  - location: Tubas Governorate
  - coordinates: 32°11′37.1″N 35°27′24.63″E
- Length: 30 km (19 mi)

Wadi al-Far'a (Arabic: وادي الفارعه) or Tirzah Stream (Hebrew: נַחַל תִּרְצָה, romanized: Nahal Tirzah) is a stream in the northern West Bank that empties into the Jordan River south of Damia Bridge. It is the largest stream in the West Bank. Wadi al-Far'a is located in the rugged area of the West Bank and cuts east through the Jordan Valley, passing through the Palestinian village of Wadi al-Far'a. The Tirzah Reservoir is used to collect the floodwater of Wadi al-Far'a before it flows into the Jordan River at a point ESE of Yafit.

== Name spelling ==
The Arabic name of Wadi al-Far'a is transliterated in Roman script in many ways. The definite article can be written as al-, el-, without hyphen, or it can be left out altogether. The name of the wadi can be spelled Far'a, Fa'ra, Far'ah, Fa'rah, Farah, Fari'a, or Fari'ah. With diacritics it is Wādī al-Fāri`ah.

The Hebrew name also has a variety of transliterations to Roman script. The word for valley or stream: Nahal or Nachal. The main part of the name: Tirza, Tirzah, Tirtza and Tirtsa.

=== In ancient sources ===
Josephus names a place of crossing near the confluence of the watercourse Naḥal Yabok with the Jordan River, not far from Wadi al-Far'a, known in classical antiquity as Coreae (Greek: Κορέας), and where is now the "Old Roman Bridge" (Arabic: Mukatta' Damieh), which once marked, in Josephus' words, "the first entrance into Judea when one passes over the midland countries." The site is listed in the 6th century Madaba map, and whose location agrees with the modern identification of Tell el-Mazar.

Bypassing Pella and Scythopolis he came to Coreae, where travelers from the interior cross into Judaea.

== Archaeology ==
=== Heavy Neolithic sites ===
The village of Wadi al-Far'a is close to a number of Heavy Neolithic archaeological sites of the Qaraoun culture. Three such sites were discovered there by Francis Turville-Petre between 1925 and 1926. These are Wadi Farah, Shemouniyeh, and an occupational site at Wadi Sallah. The site at Wadi Farah was identified as a flint factory on a high terrace at the meeting point with the Wadi Salhah. Large numbers of massive flint tools and debris were found and linked to this little known culture. Tools found included picks, adzes, borers and flake scrapers.

=== Chalcolithic ===
Far'at ej-Jiftlik, situated ca. 3 km southeast of Al-Jiftlik on the right bank of Wadi Far'a, was the site of one of the two large Chalcolithic settlements in the flood plain of the stream, along with Kaziyet er-Ratrut. See also Tell el-Far'a here below.

=== Tell el-Far'ah (North) ===
An archaeological mound situated near the village of Wadi al-Far'a, Tell el-Far'ah (North), has been identified as the location of biblical Tirzah. The tell has occupation layers from the Neolithic, Chalcolithic, Bronze Age, and Iron Age. It is called Tell el-Far'ah (North) in order to distinguish it from Tell el-Far'ah (South), an archaeological site south of Gaza.

== See also ==
- Far'a refugee camp
- List of rivers of the Palestine region
- Ras al-Far'a town
- Wadi al-Far'a village

== Bibliography ==
- Bugbee, Lucius H. (1901). The Mosaic Map of Medeba. Chicago: University of Chicago. p. 8.
- Josephus. Antiquities of the Jews (14.3.4).
- Simchoni, Jacob N. (1968). The History of the War of the Jews with the Romans (in Hebrew). Ramat-Gan: Masada.
