= Yarza =

Yarza is a Spanish surname. Notable people with the surname include:

- Antonio Arregui Yarza (1939–2026), Ecuadorian bishop
- Enrique Yarza (1930–2001), Spanish footballer
- Jenara Vicenta Arnal Yarza (1902–1960), Spanish chemist
- Joaquín Yarza (1881–1972), Spanish footballer
- Joaquín Yarza Luaces (1936–2016), Spanish art historian
- José Nasazzi (1901–1968), Uruguayan footballer, full name José Nasazzi Yarza
- Manuel Yarza (1884–?), Spanish footballer
- María Begoña Yarza (born 1964), Chilean politician
- Natividad Yarza Planas (1872–1960), Spanish politician
- Rosita Yarza (1922–1996), Spanish actress
