= Ein al-Beida =

- Municipality type D (Village council)

Arabic transcription(s)
  - Arabic: عين البيضا
  - Latin: Ayn al-Bayda (official) 'Ayn al-Baydah (unofficial)
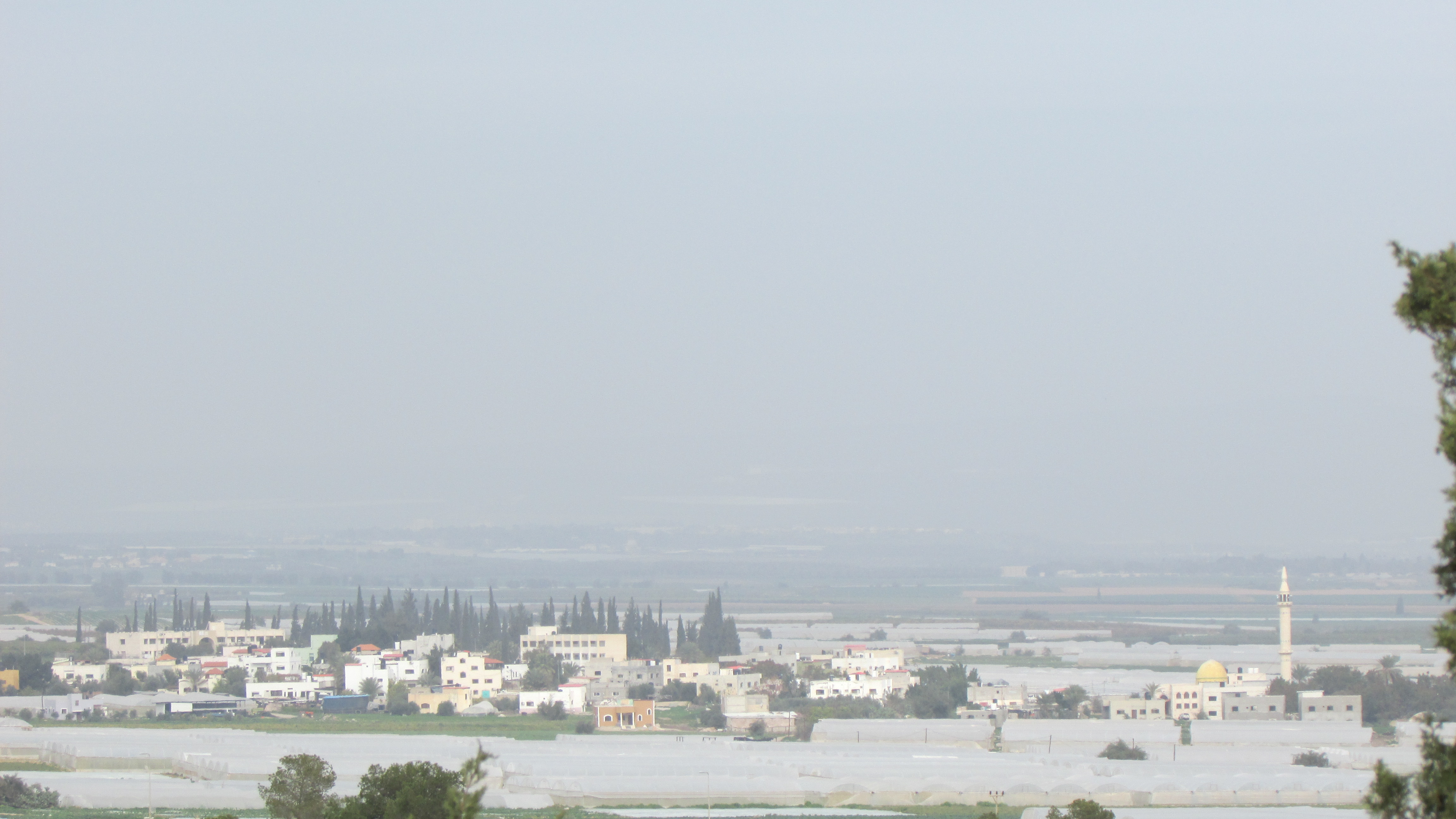
- Ein al-Beida

- Location of Ein al-Beida within Palestine
- Coordinates: 32°22′50″N 35°30′28″E
- Palestine grid: 197/198
- State: State of Palestine
- Governorate: Tubas
- Founded: 1952

Government
  - Type: Village council (from 1996)

Area
  - Total: 15.0 km^{2} (5.8 sq mi)

Population (2017)
  - Total: 1,138
  - Density: 75.9/km^{2} (196/sq mi)
- Name meaning: "The White Spring"

Ein al-Beida (Arabic: عين البيضا) is a Palestinian village of in the Tubas Governorate in the northeastern West Bank. It has a population of about 1,138.

== History ==
Ceramics from the Byzantine era have been found here.

In the wake of the 1948 Arab–Israeli War, and after the 1949 Armistice Agreements, Ein al-Beida came under Jordanian rule.

Ein al-Beida was reestablished in 1952 by Arab farmers belonging to the Fuquha and Daraghmah families from nearby Tubas who owned farms in the area and decided to establish a village. The village is named after a large spring in the area, Ein al-Beida, which was once used to irrigate the neighboring land.

In the 1961 Jordanian census Ein al-Beida's population was 573.

=== Post 1967 ===
Since the Six-Day War in 1967, Ein al-Beida has been under Israeli occupation. The spring nearby which provided some of its farmers with irrigation dried up when the Israeli water company Mekorot drilled a well nearby in order to supply the Israeli settlement of Mehola with water.

Shortly after the 1967 war, some of their land was fenced off and afterwards used by the settlers of Mehola. While the Ein al-Beida inhabitants said they had documents proving that they owned the land, the Israeli settlers said it was owned absentee landlords. In 2026 it was documented that some products from Mehola was falsely exported as being made in Israel.

== Geography and climate ==
Ein al-Beida is situated in a plain area on the eastern foothill of the Jordan Valley surrounded by hills and mountains. It is located 15 kilometers northeast of Tubas, bordered by the Jordan River to the east, Bardala to the west, the Green Line to the north and the Israeli settlement of Mehola to the south. The town's elevation is 166 meters below sea level.

The total jurisdiction of the village is 15,000 dunams, constituting 3% of the Tubas Governorate's land. Built-up area accounts for 480 dunams while 8,500 dunams are agricultural or cultivated lands.

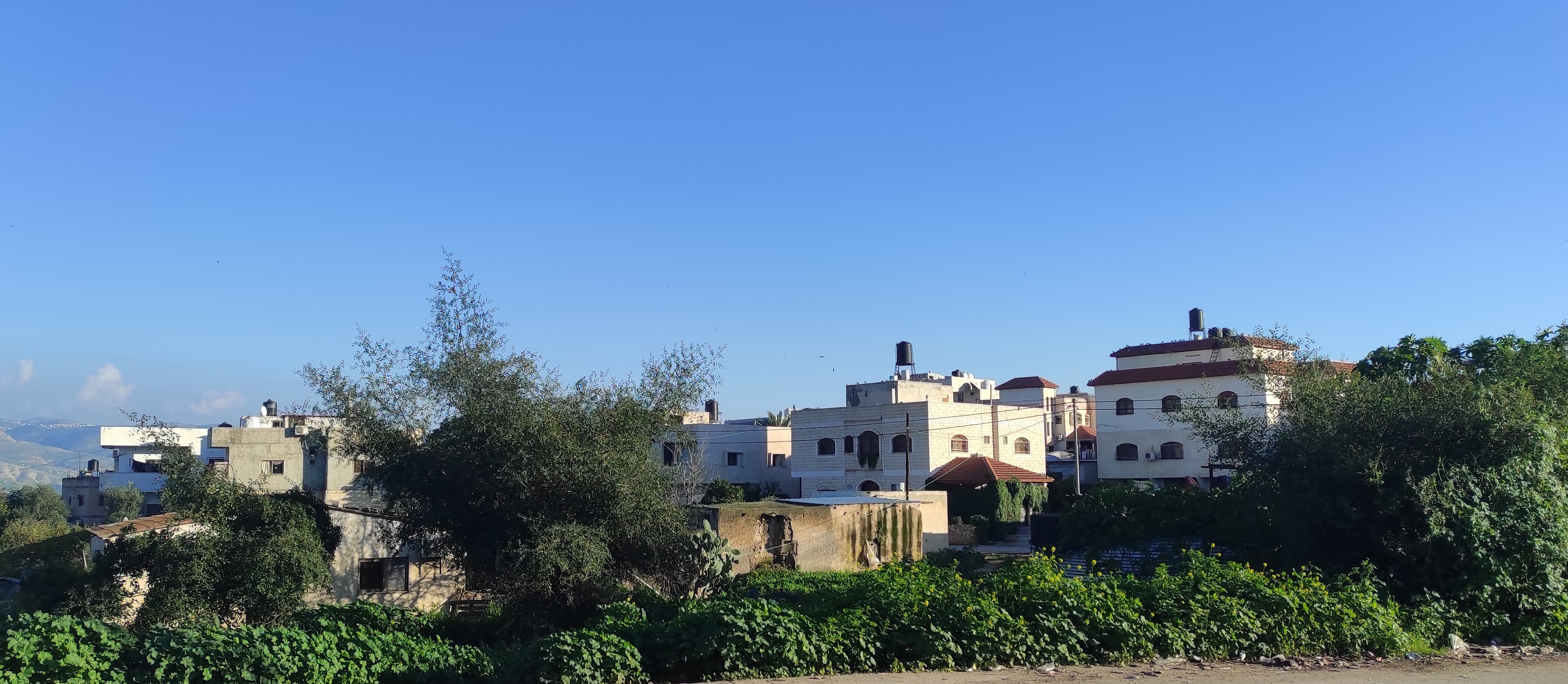
Ein al-Beida Feb 24

Warm weather is characteristic of Ein al-Beida, with hot, dry summers and cold and dry winters. The average rainfall in the village 275 millimeters. The average annual temperature is 21-22 degrees Celsius and the humidity rate is 55%.

== Demographics ==
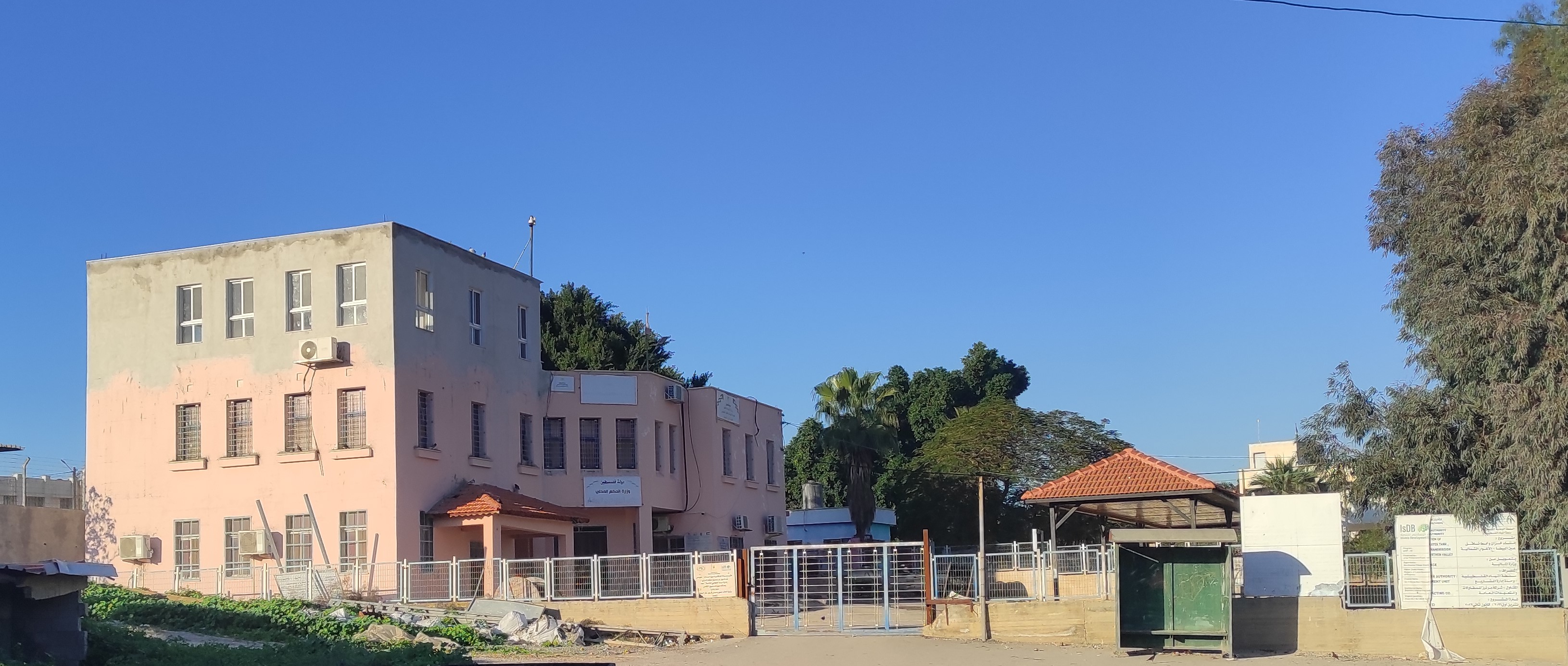
Ein al-Beida school

Ein al-Beida's population in 1961 was 573, increasing to 791 in 1997. According to a census by the Palestinian Central Bureau of Statistics (PCBS) in that year, 398 were males and 393 were females. The census also revealed that 42.9% of the inhabitants were younger than 15, 54.1% between the ages of 15 and 64 and 3% above the age of 64. In 2006, Ein al-Beida's population was 1,048 and it was 1,138 by 2017. The Fuquha family represent about 80% of the village residents while the Daraghma represent roughly 20%.

== Government ==
A village council was established in 1996 to govern Ein al-Beida. It consists of 7 members, including a chairman and holds elections every four years. Responsibilities of the council include administration, planning and development, social services, infrastructural maintenance and utilities.

== Bibliography ==
- Conder, C.R.; Kitchener, H.H. (1882). The Survey of Western Palestine: Memoirs of the Topography, Orography, Hydrography, and Archaeology. Vol. 2. London: Committee of the Palestine Exploration Fund.
- Dauphin, C. (1998). La Palestine byzantine, Peuplement et Populations. BAR International Series 726 (in French). Vol. III : Catalogue. Oxford: Archeopress. ISBN 0-860549-05-4.
- Government of Jordan, Department of Statistics (1964). First Census of Population and Housing. Volume I: Final Tables; General Characteristics of the Population (PDF).
- Palmer, E.H. (1881). The Survey of Western Palestine: Arabic and English Name Lists Collected During the Survey by Lieutenants Conder and Kitchener, R. E. Transliterated and Explained by E.H. Palmer. Committee of the Palestine Exploration Fund.
