= Far'a =

Refugee camp in Tubas, State of Palestine

Far'a Camp
- Refugee Camp

Arabic transcription(s)
  - Arabic: 'مخيّم الفارعة
  - Latin: al-Fari'ah (official); Faraa (unofficial)
- Location of Far'a Camp within Palestine
- Coordinates: 32°17′38.35″N 35°20′39.74″E
- State: State of Palestine
- Governorate: Tubas

Government
  - Type: Refugee Camp (from 1949)

Area
  - Total: 0.26 km^{2} (0.10 sq mi)

Population (2017)
  - Total: 5,625
  - Density: 22,000/km^{2} (56,000/sq mi)
- including non-refugees
- Name meaning: "Branches"

Far'a, Faraa or al-Fari'ah (Arabic: مخيّم الفارعة) is a Palestinian refugee camp in the foothills of the Jordan Valley in the northwestern West Bank. It is located 12 kilometers south of Jenin, 2 kilometers south of Tubas, 3 kilometers northwest of Tammun, and 17 kilometers northeast of Nablus.

== Demographics ==
According to the Palestinian Central Bureau of Statistics (PCBS), the camp had a population of 5,750 refugees in 2006. The UNRWA recorded a population of 7,244 registered refugees in 2005. The PCBS recorded a population of 5,625 by 2017.

== History ==
Far'a was established in 1949 following the 1948 Arab-Israeli War on 255 dunams of land. It is one of the few camps in the West Bank that is supplied water by the nearby spring of Far'a, from which the camp receives its name. The camp was under Jordanian and Israeli occupation until November 1998, when it came under the complete control of the Palestinian National Authority, as a result of the Wye River Memorandum.

Most of the camp's labor force works in agriculture and some work in construction in the Israeli settlements of the Jordan Valley. In 1996, the UNRWA built two schools in Far'a with financial contributions from the European Union and by 2005 there were 1,794 pupils. In 2005, 863 families depended on UN food rations.

== See also ==
- Ras al-Far'a town
- Wadi al-Far'a village
- Wadi al-Far'a (river)
