= Souf Camp =

Coordinates: 32°18′30″N 35°53′7.37″E

Souf Camp (Arabic: مخيم سوف) is a Palestinian refugee camp situated nearby the town of Souf and the city of Jerash in Jordan. According to the United Nations Relief and Works Agency (UNRWA), there was 21,900 people living in the camp in 2005, of which 20,530 were registered refugees.

== History ==
Souf Camp is one of the six emergency camps set up in Jordan for Palestinian refugees fleeing the West Bank from incoming Israeli forces during the Six-Day War in June 1967. Most of the refugees were 1948 refugees from Bayt Jibrin and 'Ajjur as well as Palestinians from the city of Tubas.

== Local infrastructure ==
There are 135 commercial shops, three bakeries and one pharmacy in the camp. There is 35,000 square meters of road in Souf. About 98% of the inhabitants have access to water. The Jordanian government runs a post office, a police station and youth club in Souf. There are six schools in the camp, four managed by the UNRWA and the only two secondary schools by the Jordanian government.
