= Joaquín Yarza Luaces =

Spanish art historian

- Born: 16 August 1936; Ferrol, La Coruña
- Died: 6 March 2016 (aged 79); Barcelona, Spain
- Occupations: Historian, writer, university professor
- Known for: Medieval Arts

Joaquín Yarza Luaces (August 16, 1936, in Ferrol, Spain – March 6, 2016, in Barcelona) was a Spanish art historian. Professor Yarza began his professional career in Madrid. He began his work as a teacher in Barcelona in 1974, where he later died. Since then, he has been a guide to medieval studies with special prominence in Renaissance subjects.

== Biography ==
Joaquín is the grandson of José Joaquín Yarza Albea, eminence of the naval world in Spain. Joaquín Yarza was destined to be a naval engineer, as this was the tradition of the Yarza family, originally from Donostia (Spain) and settled in Vigo (Spain). After his first course at the Polytechnic University of Madrid, the brilliant student discovered that his true passion was not the ships, but art history. Once the decision was made, he presented himself at home in front of his father, delivered his honour grades in his first course of naval engineering, and communicated to his family his desire to devote himself to his passion. He studied art history at the Complutense University of Madrid from 1961 to 1965, where he began teaching after writing a doctorate thesis entitled "Iconography of the miniature of the eleventh and twelfth centuries in the kingdoms of Castile and León. For several years he combined the positions of professor at the Universidad Complutense de Madrid (1965-1969) and the Universidad Autónoma de Madrid (1968-1974). From 1974 to 1981, he was a professor of art history at the University of Barcelona and later at the Autonomous University of Barcelona where he was professor of art.

Joaquin Yarza did most of his research and literary works on the study of medieval Hispanic art and Byzantine art. In spite of his almost exclusive dedication to the medieval period, he has also made explorations in the field of the history of Renaissance painting, with studies dedicated to Navarrete el Mudo and Alonso de Herrera and within the field of sculpture, Pedro Berruguete.

He has published works of a general nature, such as Art and Architecture in Spain, 500-1250 (1987) and The Middle Ages (1988) and coordinated others on written artistic sources, such as Medieval art, I and II (1982). He has also been interested in the miniature of both the tenth century (Blessed Gerona, Antiphon of Leon) and Romanesque (Burgos Bible). He is the director and co-author of an Art History manual for high school students (1978). He has participated in divulgative works such as Gothic Painting (1987) or Gothic Art (1991).

He collaborated actively in the production of the catalog of the medieval Museo Frederic Marès of Barcelona. He directed the magazine Of the Department of Art History of the Autonomous University of Barcelona Locus Amoenus from its creation in 1995. He was also part of the next magazines Cuadernos de Historia de España (Buenos Aires), Traza y Baza (UB), D’Art (UB), Quaderns d’Estudis Medievals (Art Estudi) and Artigrama (Universidad de Zaragoza).

He was member of the Spanish Committee of History of the Art between 1982 and 1988. From 1990 he was part of the Board of Museums of Catalonia and of the Board of Qualification, Valuation and Export of Goods of the Cultural Patrimony of Catalonia.

== Outstanding works ==
=== Author ===
- Iconografía de la miniatura castellano-leonesa. Siglos XI y XII. (Extracto Tesis). Ediciones Castilla: Madrid, 1973
- Arte y arquitectura en España 500-1250. Cátedra (Manuales Arte): Madrid, 1979 (9ª ed., 2000)
- Arte medieval (Historia del arte hispánico, II). Alhambra: Madrid, 1980 (2ª ed., 1982)
- El Pórtico de la Gloria. Ed. Cero Ocho–Alianza: Cuenca-Madrid, 1984
- Arte asturiano, arte “mozárabe”. Servicio de Publicaciones, Universidad de Extremadura (Cuadernos de historia del arte, 5): Cáceres, 1985
- Formas artísticas de lo imaginario Anthropos (Palabra plástica, 9): Barcelona, 1987
- El arte gótico II. Historia 16 (Historia del arte, 20): Madrid, 1991
- La pintura del antiguo Egipto. Ed. Vicens- Vives (Historia visual del arte, 2): Barcelona, 1991
- Gil de Siloé Historia 16 (Cuadernos de Arte Español, 3): Madrid, 1991
- Baja Edad Media. Los siglos del gótico. (Introducción al Arte español). Sílex: Madrid, 1992
- El arte bizantino. Anaya (Biblioteca Básica de Arte). Madrid, 1991. (Edición italiana, Fenice 2000, Milán 1995)
- Los Reyes Católicos. Paisaje de una monarquía. Nerea: Madrid, 1993
- Retaules gòtics de la Seu de Manresa. Angle Editorial (Patrimoni Artístic de la Catalunya Central, 1): Manresa, 1993
- Jan van Eyck Historia 16 (El Arte y sus creadores, 5): Madrid, 1994
- Fuentes de la Historia del Arte I. Historia 16 (Conocer el Arte, 21): Madrid, 1997
- El Bosco y la pintura flamenca de los siglos XV- XVI. Guía de sala. Fundación Amigos del Museo del Prado- Alianza Editorial: Madrid, 1998 (edición en inglés)
- El Jardín de las Delicias de El Bosco. T.F. Editores: Madrid, 1998
- Beato de Líebana. Manuscritos iluminados. M. Moleiro ed.: Barcelona, 1998
- El retablo de la Flagelación de Leonor de Velasco. Ediciones El Viso: Madrid, 1999
- Gil Siloe. El Retablo de la Concepción en la Capilla del obispo Acuña. Asociación Amigos de la Catedral de Burgos: Burgos, 2000
- Alejo de Vahía, mestre d’imatges “catálogo de exposición”. Museu Frederic Marès- Ajuntament de Barcelona (Quaderns del Museu Frederic Marès. Exposicions, 6): Barcelona, 2001

=== Editor ===
- Arte medieval I. Alta Edad Media y Bizancio. (Fuentes y documentos para la Historia del Arte, II) (ed. y coord.). Gustavo Gili: Barcelona, 1982
- Arte Medieval II. Románico y Gótico. (Fuentes y documentos para la Historia del Arte, III) (ed. y coord.). Gustavo Gili: Barcelona, 1982
- Actas del V Congreso Español de Historia del Arte. (Barcelona, 29 octubre- 3 noviembre 1984) (J. Yarza y F. Español, eds.), vol. I Generalitat de Catalunya, Barcelona, 1986
- Estudios de iconografía medieval español. Universidad Autónoma de Barcelona: Bellaterra, 1984
- Catàleg d’escultura i pintura medievals. (Fons del Museu Frederic Marès/1), (F. Español y J. Yarza, dir.), Barcelona, 1991
- El Museo Frederic Marès. Barcelona (F. Español y J. Yarza), Ludion- Ibercaja (Musa Nostra. Colección Europea de Museos y monumentos): Bruselas, 1996
- L’artista artesà medieval a la Corona d’Aragó. Actes (Lleida, 14- 16 enero 1998). (J. Yarza y F. Fité, eds.) Institut d’Estudis Ilerdencs- Edicions de la Universitat de Lleida, 1999
- La miniatura medieval en la península Ibérica. Murcia: Nausícaä, 2007

== Sources ==
- M.L. Melero Moneo, F. Español Bertrán y A. Orriols i Alsina, Semblanza académica y lista de publicaciones, en Imágenes y promotores en el arte medieval. Miscelánea en homenaje a Joaquín Yarza Luaces, Universitat Autònoma de Barcelona, Bellaterra, 2001. pp. 17–37.
