= Bardala =

Village in the West Bank, Palestine

- Municipality type D (Village council)

Arabic transcription(s)
  - Arabic: بردلة
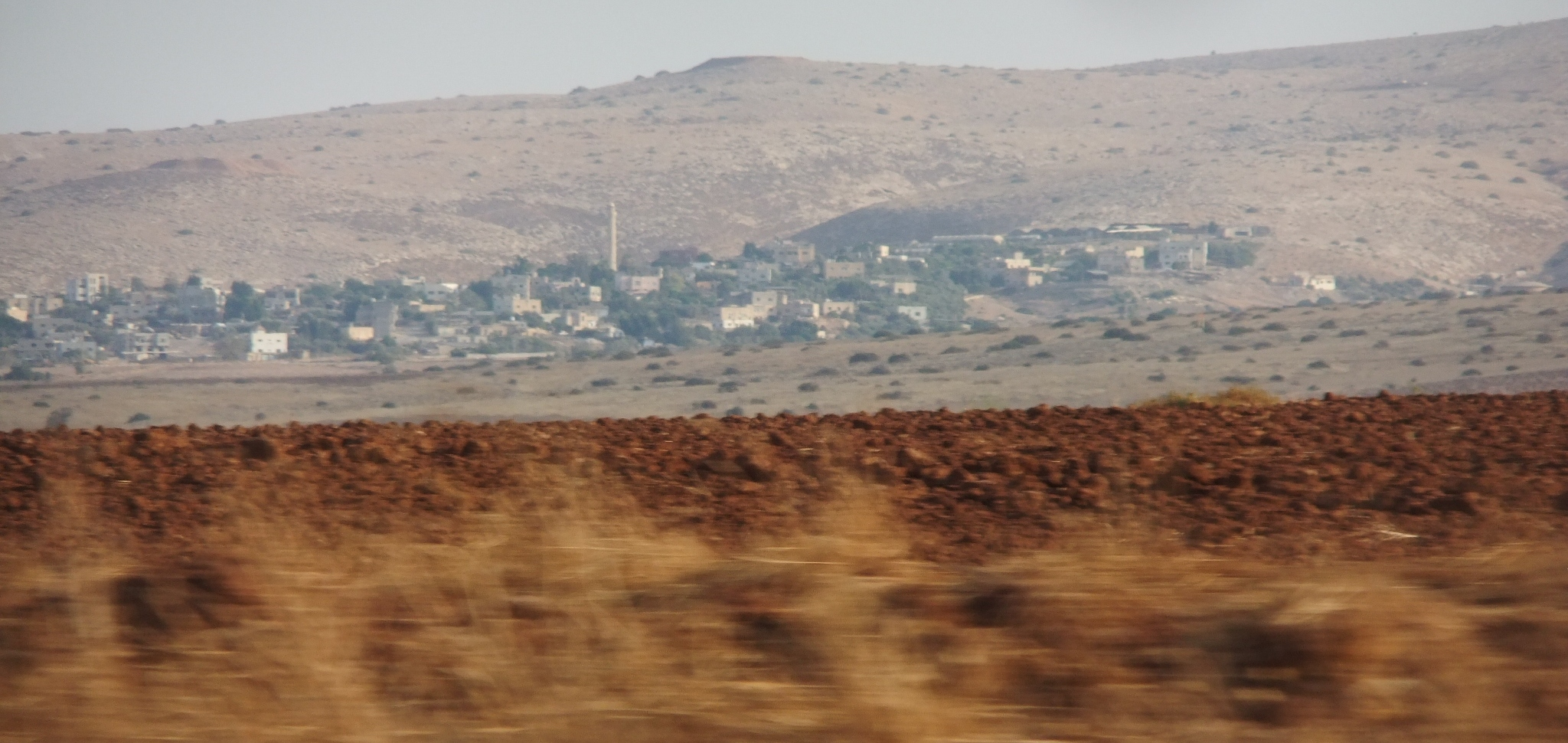
- Bardala

- Location of Bardala within Palestine
- Coordinates: 32°23′11″N 35°28′55″E
- Palestine grid: 195/199
- State: State of Palestine
- Governorate: Tubas
- Founded: 1500 BCE

Government
  - Type: Village council (from 1996)

Area
  - Total: 20.0 km^{2} (7.7 sq mi)

Population (2017)
  - Total: 1,607
  - Density: 80.3/km^{2} (208/sq mi)
- Name meaning: "Berdeleh", a personal name

Bardala (Arabic: بردلة) is a Palestinian village in the northern Jordan Valley of the West Bank, consisting of 1,607 inhabitants. The town lies in the Tubas Governorate, located thirteen kilometers northeast of Tubas and 28 kilometers northeast of Nablus. The Israeli settlement of Mehola lies nearby.

== History ==
Bardala's history dates back to 1500 BCE.

The main periods of settlement evidenced by archaeological excavation are the Byzantine, Early Islamic, Medieval, Ottoman and Modern ones; Roman-period finds were also present. A Byzantine church was built here around the year 400. On top of the remains of the church, of which the mosaic floor and column bases were excavated, stood a bathhouse from the Early Islamic period.

The name Bardala derives from Bardaweel — according to tradition the name of a prince who ruled the area in ancient times. In the town lies a palace named after him.

Bardala's water reservoirs are known to be the oldest in the Jordan Valley. Other archaeological sites include tombs from various periods. The Maqam (shrine) of al-Khader is the oldest building in the village.

The residents of Bardala originally came from nearby Tubas to exploit its cultivable and grazing land, and in 1882, the PEF's Survey of Western Palestine described the village: "though ruined, [it] is inhabited in spring by peasants from the hill villages, who descend to find pasture and to cultivate melons and other vegetables round the springs."

=== British Mandate era ===
In the 1945 statistics, the population of Bardala was counted with that of Tubas and Kashda, according to an official land and population survey.

=== Jordanian era ===
In the wake of the 1948 Arab–Israeli War, and after the 1949 Armistice Agreements, Bardala came under Jordanian rule.

The population surged after the 1948 Arab–Israeli War, which left many Palestinians homeless in the wake of the destruction of nearby villages.

In 1961, Bardala had a population of 367 inhabitants.

=== Post-1967 ===
Since the 1967 Six-Day War, Bardala has been under Israeli occupation.

Archaeologists have discovered evidence of an abundance of ground water resources in the area in ancient times. After Israel took control of the area in 1967, the village was connected to the Israeli water grid.

Civil control of the village was passed to the Palestinian National Authority in 1995. During the Second Intifada, the residents of Bardala stopped paying both water and electricity bills to the Palestinian National Authority, and, as a consequence the Palestinian authorities have delayed implementing infrastructural works, such as a dam and a water network for the village. Israel placed restrictions on villagers' movements at the same time, rendering it impossible to access their lands to cultivate or harvest crops. Since 2000, 200 dunams of vegetable crops have been bulldozed and many trees uprooted, and 4,000 dunams have been confiscated.

In March 2012, a UN report listed the spring Ein El Azut, belonging to Bardala, among a number of springs which had been illegally taken over by Israeli settlers. Local Palestinians had formerly used the spring for irrigation and livestock.

Bardala has been subject to attacks by Israeli settlers multiple times, including during the Gaza war, when attacks by Israeli settlers increased across the West Bank. The nature of the attacks ranges from property damage (including tree uprooting, destruction of farmland, and arson) to threats and physical assaults. The attacks on Bardala increased further in frequency after a new Israeli outpost was established to the northwest of the village in late 2024.

== Geography and climate ==
Bardala is located in the Jordan Valley, at the foot of the hills rising west and southwest of it. Immediately north of Bardala stretches the Green Line which marks the border between the West Bank and Israel, and behind it lies the plain of Beit She'an/Beisan, which connects westwards to the Jezreel Valley. The elevation of Bardala is 71 meters below sea level. Nearby towns and villages include Tubas to the southwest and Ein al-Beida to the east. Bardala's jurisdiction covers an area of 20,000 dunams, making up 4% of the Tubas Governorate lands. The built-up area of the town is 480 dunams, while 10,000 dunams are classified as agricultural land and 400 dunams have been confiscated by Israeli authorities.

Warm climate is characteristic of the town, with hot and dry summers and cold and dry winters. The average rainfall is 293 millimeters and the average annual temperature was 21 to 22 degrees Celsius. The average humidity rate is 55%.

== Demographics ==
In 1961, Bardala had a population of 367 inhabitants, which decreased to 271 in 1982 due to emigration. The population nearly doubled to 457 five years later. The entire population of Bardala comprises 3.3% of the governorate's population.

According to a 1997 census by the Palestinian Central Bureau of Statistics (PCBS), the town's residents numbered 1,148, of which 566 were males and 582 were females. The age distribution was 49.3% between infancy and 14, 30.4% between the ages of 15 and 29, 22.8% between the ages of 30 and 64, and 2.8% were above the age of 65.

In the 2007 census by the PCBS, Bardala had a population of 1,637 and 1,607 by 2017.

Over 90% of its inhabitants belong to the town's original inhabitants, the Sawafta family. The remaining 10% are refugees from towns near Beit She'an in present-day Israel and Bedouins.

== Bibliography ==
- Conder, C.R.; Kitchener, H.H. (1882). The Survey of Western Palestine: Memoirs of the Topography, Orography, Hydrography, and Archaeology. Vol. 2. London: Committee of the Palestine Exploration Fund.
- Dauphin, C. (1998). La Palestine byzantine, Peuplement et Populations. BAR International Series 726 (in French). Vol. III : Catalogue. Oxford: Archeopress. ISBN 0-860549-05-4.
- Government of Jordan, Department of Statistics (1964). First Census of Population and Housing. Volume I: Final Tables; General Characteristics of the Population (PDF).
- Government of Palestine, Department of Statistics (1945). Village Statistics, April, 1945.
- Greenberg, Raphael; Keinan, Adi (2009). Israeli Archaeological Activity in the West Bank 1967-2007: A Sourcebook (PDF). Ostracon. ISBN 978-965-91468-0-2.
- Hadawi, S. (1970). Village Statistics of 1945: A Classification of Land and Area ownership in Palestine. Palestine Liberation Organization Research Center.
- Palmer, E.H. (1881). The Survey of Western Palestine: Arabic and English Name Lists Collected During the Survey by Lieutenants Conder and Kitchener, R. E. Transliterated and Explained by E.H. Palmer. Committee of the Palestine Exploration Fund.
- Stemberger, Gunter (1999). Jews and Christians in the Holy Land: Palestine in the Fourth Century. Bloomsbury T&T Clark. ISBN 978-0567086990.
- Zertal, A. (2017). The Manasseh Hill Country Survey. Vol. 4. Boston: BRILL. ISBN 978-9004346963.
