= Wadi al-Far'a =

- Municipality type D (Village council)

Arabic transcription(s)
  - Arabic: وادي الفارعة
  - Latin: Wadi al-Fari'ah (official); Tarza'a (unofficial)
- Location of Wadi al-Far'a within Palestine
- Coordinates: 32°16′50″N 35°20′31″E
- State: Palestine
- Governorate: Tubas
- Founded: 1960s

Government
  - Type: Village council (from 1996)

Area
  - Total: 12.0 km^{2} (4.6 sq mi)

Population (2017)
  - Total: 3,998
  - Density: 333/km^{2} (863/sq mi)
- Name meaning: "Valley of the Branches"

Wadi al-Far'a (Arabic: وادي الفارعة) is a Palestinian village in the Tubas Governorate of the State of Palestine, in the northeastern West Bank, located five kilometers southwest of Tubas. It has a land area of 12,000 dunams, of which 337 is built-up and 10,500 are for agricultural purposes. It is under the complete control of the Palestinian National Authority and is adjacent to the Far'a refugee camp. According to the Palestinian Central Bureau of Statistics, Wadi al-Far'a had a population of 3,998 inhabitants in 2017.

== Archaeology ==
See Wadi al-Far'a (river)#Archaeology and Tirzah (ancient city)

For the nearby Heavy Neolithic archaeological sites of the Qaraoun culture (Wadi Farah, Shemouniyeh and Wadi Sallah) and for Tell el-Far'ah (North), the location of biblical Tirzah, see the above-mentioned links.

== History ==
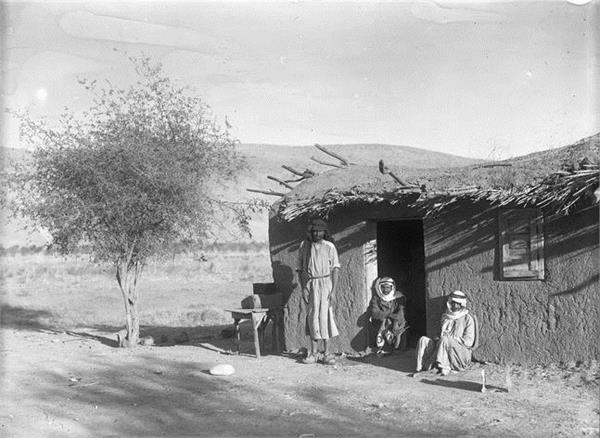
Wadi al-Far’a 1934

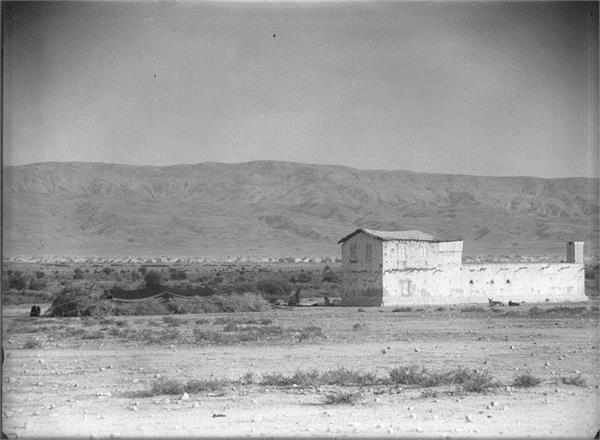
Wadi al-Far’a 1934

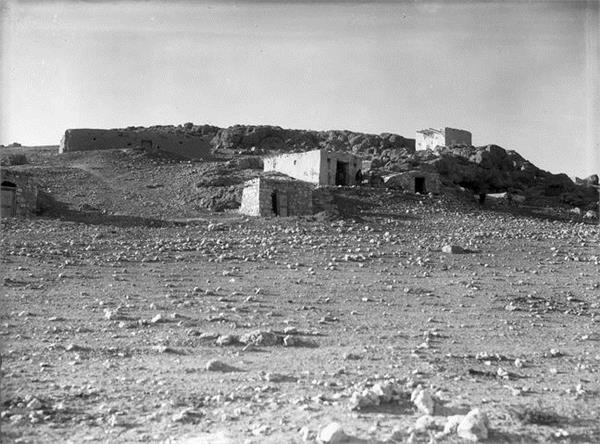
Wadi al-Far’a 1934

Wadi al-Far'a was historically known as Tarza'a and its current name comes from its geographic location, being near the Far'a spring. The village's land was previously owned by residents of nearby Talluza who used it as farmland. In the 1960s, residents from Talluza settled in the area and established a separate village. In 1996, Wadi al-Far'a was officially declared separate from Talluza and was granted its own village council under the Tubas Governorate.

== Demographics ==
In the 1997 census by the Palestinian Central Bureau of Statistics, Wadi al-Far'a had a population of 1,713 inhabitants. Males constituted 51.3% and females constituted 49.7% of the population. In 2006, it grew to 2,341 rising by 32.5%. There are six main families in the village: al-Janajreh (30%), al-Barahameh (30%), as-Salahat (30%) the Darawhsheh, Shanableh and Balatya represent the remaining 10%.

== See also ==
- Far'a refugee camp
- Ras al-Far'a town
