= 'Aqqaba =

Palestinian town in the northern West Bank

- Municipality type C

Arabic transcription(s)
  - Arabic: عقّابة
  - Latin: al-Aqaba (official); Akkaba (unofficial)
- Location of 'Aqqaba within Palestine
- Coordinates: 32°21′03″N 35°20′59″E
- Palestine grid: 183/195
- State: State of Palestine
- Governorate: Tubas

Government
  - Type: Municipality

Population (2017)
  - Total: 8,239
- Name meaning: the steep or mountain road

'Aqqaba (Arabic: عقّابة) is a Palestinian town located on a slope in the Jordan Valley in the northern West Bank, 15 kilometers northeast of Jenin in the Tubas Governorate of the State of Palestine. According to the Palestinian Central Bureau of Statistics (PCBS), the town had a population of 8,239 inhabitants in the 2017 census.

== History ==
Pottery remains from the Persian, Hellenistic and Byzantine eras have been found here.

'Aqqaba is identified with Iqbin (Hebrew: איקבין), mentioned in the 6th-7th century Mosaic of Reḥob as a Jewish settlement in the region of Sebastia inhabited mostly by non-Jews and therefore produce obtained from the area could be taken by Jews without the normal restrictions imposed during the Sabbatical years or tithing.

=== Ottoman era ===
'Aqqaba, like the rest of Palestine, was incorporated into the Ottoman Empire in 1517, and in the census of 1596, the village was located in the Nahiya of Jabal Sami of the Liwa of Nablus. The population was 22 households and 5 bachelors, all Muslim. The villagers paid a fixed tax rate of 33.3% on various agricultural products, such as wheat, barley, summer crops, olive trees, goats and/or beehives, in addition to "occasional revenues"; a total of 5,982 akçe.

In 1870 Victor Guérin found the village to have 130 inhabitants, who had a mosque in the eastern part of the village.

In 1882, the PEF's Survey of Western Palestine described it as "a good sized village on the northern slope of Ras el Akra. It is surrounded with brushwood on the hills, but has arable land below."

=== British Mandate of Palestine ===
In the 1922 census of Palestine, conducted by the British Mandate authorities, 'Aqqaba had a population of 330; 322 Muslims and 8 Christian Orthodox, increasing in the 1931 census to 411; 9 Christians and 403 Muslims, in a total of 89 houses.

In the 1945 statistics the population was 600; 20 Christians and 580 Muslims, with 8,068 dunams of land, according to an official land and population survey. Of this, 1,259 dunams were used for plantations and irrigable land, 4,284 dunams were for cereals, while 54 dunams were built-up (urban) land.

=== Jordanian era ===
In the wake of the 1948 Arab–Israeli War, and after the 1949 Armistice Agreements, 'Aqqaba came under Jordanian rule.

In 1961, the population had reached 1,164.

=== Post 1967 ===
Since the Six-Day War in 1967, 'Aqqaba has been held under Israeli occupation.

'Aqqaba is made up of three main families: Abu Arra, Abu Ghannam and al-Masri. During clear weather, Haifa could be seen from the west on the Mediterranean Sea as well as the summit of Jabal ash-Sheikh in Lebanon, while from the east the mountains of Ajloun in Jordan are clearly seen day and night. 'Aqqaba is the highest point in the Tubas Governorate. 'Aqqaba lies five kilometers east the Arab American University.

On 6 August 2024, four Palestinians were killed in an Israeli raid on the village.

== Bibliography ==
- Barron, J.B., ed. (1923). Palestine: Report and General Abstracts of the Census of 1922. Government of Palestine.
- Conder, C.R.; Kitchener, H.H. (1882). The Survey of Western Palestine: Memoirs of the Topography, Orography, Hydrography, and Archaeology. Vol. 2. London: Committee of the Palestine Exploration Fund.
- Government of Jordan, Department of Statistics (1964). First Census of Population and Housing. Volume I: Final Tables; General Characteristics of the Population (PDF).
- Government of Palestine, Department of Statistics (1945). Village Statistics, April, 1945.
- Guérin, V. (1874). Description Géographique Historique et Archéologique de la Palestine (in French). Vol. 2: Samarie, pt. 1. Paris: L'Imprimerie Nationale.
- Hadawi, S. (1970). Village Statistics of 1945: A Classification of Land and Area ownership in Palestine. Palestine Liberation Organization Research Center.
- Hütteroth, W.-D.; Abdulfattah, K. (1977). Historical Geography of Palestine, Transjordan and Southern Syria in the Late 16th Century. Erlanger Geographische Arbeiten, Sonderband 5. Erlangen, Germany: Vorstand der Fränkischen Geographischen Gesellschaft. ISBN 3-920405-41-2.
- Mills, E., ed. (1932). Census of Palestine 1931. Population of Villages, Towns and Administrative Areas. Jerusalem: Government of Palestine.
- Palmer, E.H. (1881). The Survey of Western Palestine: Arabic and English Name Lists Collected During the Survey by Lieutenants Conder and Kitchener, R. E. Transliterated and Explained by E.H. Palmer. Committee of the Palestine Exploration Fund.
- Zertal, A. (2007). The Manasseh Hill Country Survey. Vol. 2. Boston: BRILL. ISBN 978-9004163690.
