= Al-Bikai'a =

al-Bikai'a
- Village Cluster

Arabic transcription(s)
  - Arabic: البقيعة
  - Latin: al-Buqei'a (official)
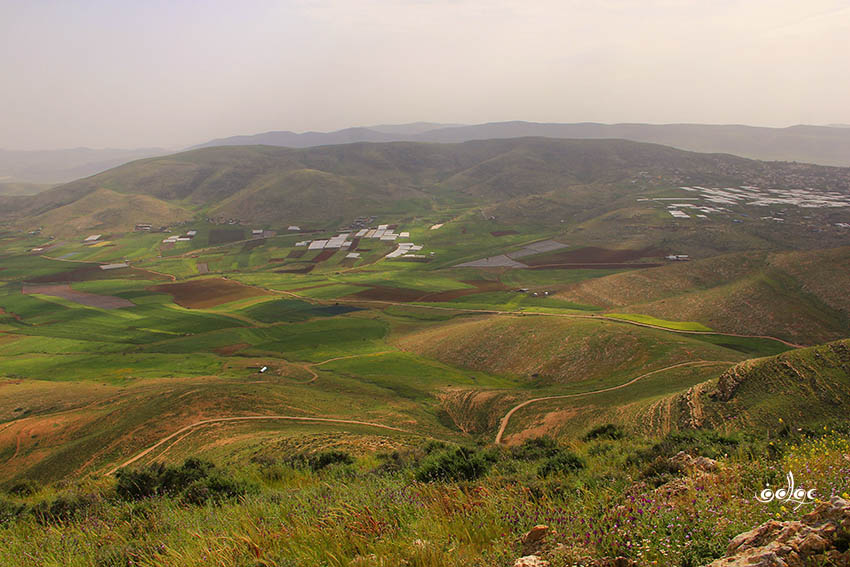
- Al-Bikai'a

- Location of al-Bikai'a within Palestine
- Coordinates: 32°15′53.38″N 35°26′12.98″E
- State: State of Palestine
- Governorate: Tubas
- Founded: 1500 BCE

Government
  - Type: Village Cluster (from 1996)

Area
  - Total: 29.5 km^{2} (11.4 sq mi)

Population (2006)
  - Total: 1,850
  - Density: 62.7/km^{2} (162/sq mi)

Al-Bikai'a also spelled al-Buqei'a (Arabic: البقيعة) is a Palestinian village cluster in the Tubas Governorate of Palestine, that includes the three hamlets of Khirbet al-'Atuf, al-Hadidiyah, and Khirbet Humsa al-Fawqa. The area spans 29,250 dunams, most of which is covered by Khirbet al-'Atuf. It is situated on a flat plain surrounded by mountains and with an altitude of 50 meters above sea level. The total population of al-Bikai'a was 227 in 1997 and 1,850 in 2005. According to the Palestinian Central Bureau of Statistics, al-Hadidya had a population of 183 inhabitants.

The Abu Bakr as-Sadiq Mosque is the only mosque in al-Bikai'a and is located in Khirbet al-'Atuf. There is one school, and one kindergarten. Most residents go to nearby Tammun for education. About 72.3% of the inhabitants are literate with women comprising nearly two-thirds of the literate population. Agriculture constitutes 95% of the labor force while the remaining 5% work in Israeli construction.

== History ==
Al-Bikai'a has been settled since the Ottoman era of rule in Palestine. The villages in the area were abandoned including one named al-Sakaif. Eventually Arabs from nearby Tammun, mainly the Bani Odeh and Bsharat families settled in the area. Khirbet al-'Atuf was named after 'Atif, an Ayyubid soldier who died during the Crusades and al-Hadidiya was named after its black soil.

== Government ==
Khirbet al-'Atuf is the only locality in the al-Bikai'a cluster that has a governing committee. It consists of four elected members and one paid employee. Its responsibilities include purchasing and distributing water to its residents, opening roads and providing electricity to the residents.
