= Tubas (city) =

City in the Tubas Governorate in the West Bank, Palestine

Coordinates: 32°19′20″N 35°22′07″E

Tubas طوباس
- Municipality type A (City)

Arabic transcription(s)
  - Arabic: طوباس
  - Latin: Toubas (official); Tubass (unofficial)
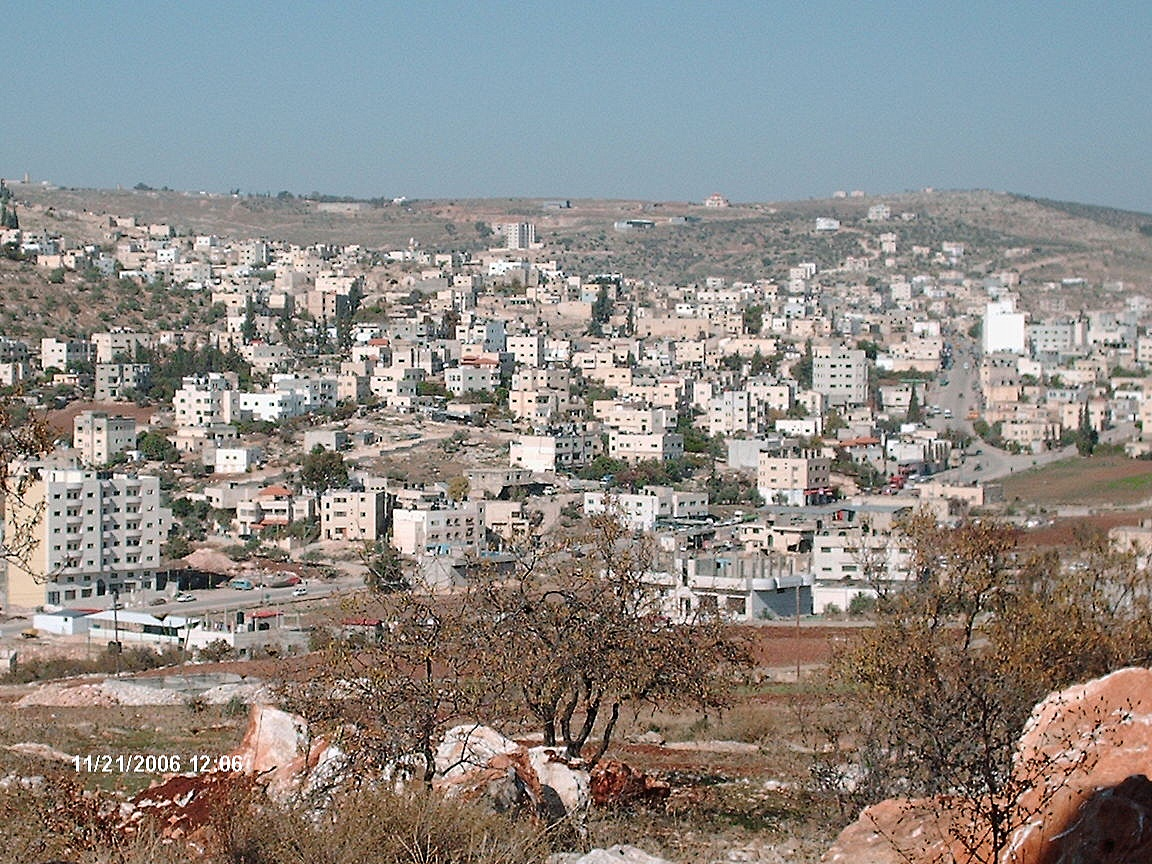
- Tubas skyline
- Interactive map of Tubas
- Location of Tubas within the West Bank Location of Tubas within Ancient Israel
- Palestine grid: 185/192
- State: Palestine
- Governorate: Tubas

Government
  - Type: City

Area
  - Total: 295.1 km^{2} (113.9 sq mi)

Population (2017)
  - Total: 21,431
  - Density: 72.62/km^{2} (188.1/sq mi)
- Website: www.tubas.ps

Tubas (Arabic: طوباس, romanized: Ṭūbās) is a city in the northeast of the West Bank, Palestine, and capital of the Tubas Governorate. A city of over 30,000 inhabitants, it is situated northeast of Nablus, west of the Jordan Valley and is an economic center. Its urban area consists of 2,271 dunams (227 hectares). It is governed by a municipal council of 15 members and most of its working inhabitants are employed in agriculture or public services.

Tubas has been identified as the ancient town of Thebez (/ˈθiːbɛz/), a Canaanite town famous for revolting against King Abimelech. In the late 19th century, during Ottoman rule in Palestine, Arab clans living in the Jordan Valley came to live in Tubas, which became a major town in the District of Nablus, particularly known for its timber and cheese making. It came under the British Mandate of Palestine in 1922, was annexed by Jordan after their capture of the town in the 1948 Arab–Israeli War, and then occupied by Israel since the 1967 Six-Day War. The Palestinian National Authority has had control of Tubas since the city was transferred to its jurisdiction in 1995.

== History ==
=== Biblical Thebez ===
Edward Robinson thought Tubas to be identical with the Canaanite/Israelite town of "Thebez" (Hebrew: תבץ) mentioned in the Hebrew Bible in the Book of Judges. It is the namesake of the titular woman of Thebez. Besides the Biblical story, nothing is known about Thebez before or after the revolt.

=== Roman and Byzantine periods ===
Archaeological remains such as cemeteries and olive presses indicate that Tubas was inhabited during the Roman period.

Eusebius mentioned Thebez being 13 Roman miles east of Neapolis (Nablus), which led to it being identified with Tubas, which is 16 km (10 mi.) east of Neapolis Nablus.

=== Ottoman period ===
==== Late 16th century ====
In 1596 it appeared in the Ottoman tax registers as "Tubas", in the nahiya of Jabal Sami in the liwa of Nablus. It had a population of 41 households and 16 bachelors, all Muslim. The villagers paid a fixed tax rate of 33.3% on wheat, barley, summer crops, olive trees, occasional revenues, goats, beehives, and a press for olives or grapes; a total of 11,704 akçe.

==== Late 19th century ====
In the late 19th century, with Palestine still being under Ottoman rule, groups of Arabs belonging to the Daraghmeh clan—mostly shepherds and farmers who lived in the Jordan Valley—migrated northward to the site because of its fertile ground, proximity to several springs, and its high elevation compared to the Jordan Valley and Wadi al-Far'a plain; Mount Gerizim was visible from the area. The Daraghmeh clan had lived in the Jordan Valley since the 15th century and in addition to Tubas, they founded or inhabited the nearby hamlets of Kardala, al-Farisiya, Khirbet al-Malih, Kishda, Yarza, and Ras al-Far'a. Soon after being established in Tubas, Arabs from Najd, Syria, Transjordan, Hebron and nearby Nablus came to settle in the area. During this period, Tubas became the site of clashes between the 'Abd al-Hadi and Tuqan families of Nablus and suffered incursions by Bedouins from areas east of the city. The Jarrar family did not inhabit, but administered Tubas, as it was located within the nahiya ("subdistrict") of Mashariq al-Jarrar.

Tubas was one of the largest villages in the District of Nablus. Most of the inhabitants resided in mud-built houses or tents in order to work on their distant lands in the Jordan Valley and to graze their sheep and goat flocks. According to traveler Herbert Rix, compared to other towns of its size in Samaria, Tubas was "well-to-do" and had abundant amounts of timber, which was harvested for firewood. Tubas, unlike the villages in the rest of the district, depended on livestock and not olives for income. Livestock products included cheese, clarified butter, woolen rugs, tents, ropes, and cloth bags. In 1882 a boys' school was established in the town.

In 1877, Lieutenant Kitchener of the Palestine Exploration Fund (PEF) survey team reported uncovering an Arabic inscription buried in the wall of the village mosque recording its building and dedication. He also wrote that the villagers had paid a bribe of £100 in gold to the Pasha of Nablus to avoid their young men being conscripted into the Turkish army fighting in Crimea. He noted that they would probably have to repeat the payment.

The PEF noted that the Samaritans believed that the tomb of Asher, known locally as Nabi Tota ("the good prophet"), was located in Tubas. The tomb served as a shrine in local Muslim tradition.

=== British Mandate ===
In 1917, the British captured Palestine from the Ottomans. After rule under a military government, it was reorganized and in 1922–1923 Tubas was incorporated into the British Mandate of Palestine.

In the 1922 census of Palestine, Tubas had a population of 3,449 (3,441 Muslims and 7 Orthodox Christians). In the 1931 census, Tubas, including Kashda and Jabagia, had 773 occupied houses and a population of 4,097 (4,068 Muslims and 29 Christians).

In Sami Hadawi's 1945 statistics, a land and population survey, Tubas and nearby Bardala had a combined population of 5,530 (5,470 Muslims and 60 Christians), with 313,123 dunams of land, according to an official land and population survey. Of this, 18,498 dunams were used for plantations and irrigable land, 98,518 dunams for cereals, while 204 dunams were built-up (urban) land.

In 1947, the United Nations drew up a partition plan to divide Palestine into Jewish and Arab states; Tubas and the surrounding villages and hamlets were to be included in the Arab state. During the 1948 Arab–Israeli War, Fawzi al-Qawuqji led 750 Arab Liberation Army (ALA) soldiers to Tubas from Transjordan and set up base there; Tubas would serve as the ALA's headquarters in central Palestine throughout the war.

=== Jordanian annexation ===
In the wake of the 1948 Arab–Israeli War, and after the 1949 Armistice Agreements, Tubas became a part of Jordan.

In 1955 the first girls' school was opened.

In 1961, the population was 5,709, while in 1964, Tubas alone had a population of 5,880.

=== Post-1967 ===
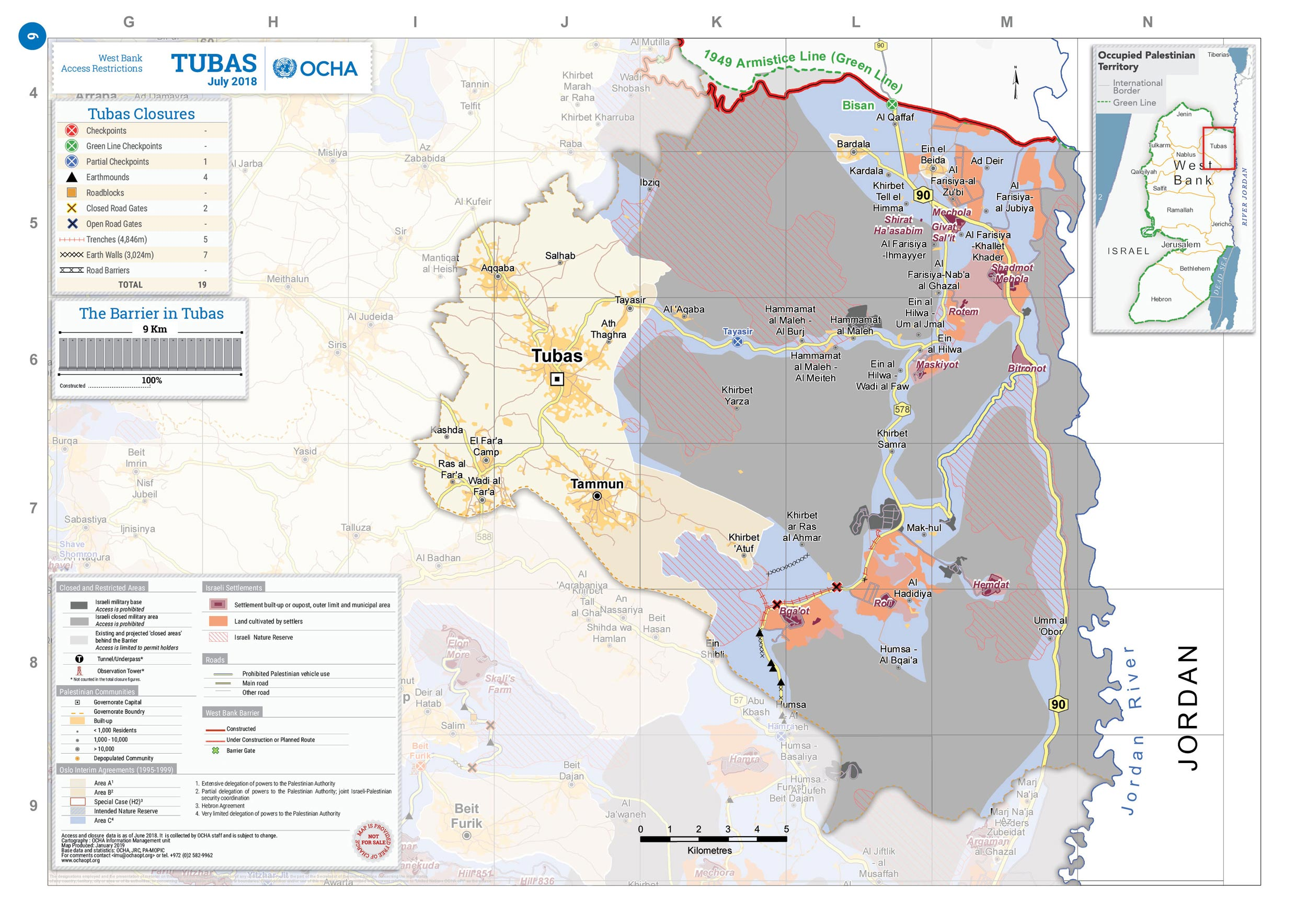
2018 United Nations map of the area, showing the Israeli occupation arrangements.

Since the Six-Day War in 1967, Tubas has been under Israeli occupation.

Tubas was transferred to Palestinian National Authority (PNA) control in 1995 under the Interim Agreement on the West Bank and the Gaza Strip. During the Jordanian and Israeli periods, the city was under the administration of the Nablus Governorate, but in 1996, the PNA declared Tubas and the immediate area to be an electoral district, and later, an independent administrative area: the Tubas Governorate.

Tubas has not seen as much violence in the Israeli–Palestinian conflict as nearby Nablus and Jenin, but a number of incidents occurred during the Second Intifada, which began in 2000. In April 2002, the Israeli military (IDF) killed six active Hamas members in the town, including Ashraf Tamza Daraghmeh—the chief Hamas commander in Tubas and the surrounding area. On August 31, 2002, an Israeli Apache helicopter fired four Hellfire missiles at a civilian car suspected of carrying a local al-Aqsa Martyrs Brigades commander and a nearby home. The strike instead killed five civilians, including two children, two teenagers and a 29-year-old Fatah activist accused of being a member of the al-Aqsa Brigades. The Israeli Defense Minister, Binyamin Ben-Eliezer, issued a statement expressing "regret" over "harming" civilians in Tubas. Ben-Eliezer described the raid in Tubas as a "mistake", and promised that the army would investigate the incident. On August 21, 2009, a clash between the Sawafta clan and another city clan left a member of the former dead and 38 others injured. Five homes were also burnt and Palestinian Security Forces arrested five people in connection to the death.

On August 27, 2024, the IDF invaded Tubas along with Nablus, Jenin, and Tulkarm as part of their "Summer Camp" offensive.

On November 26, 2025, Israel deployed heavy reinforcements to the northern Jordan Valley and sealed off large parts of the Tubas Governorate. Residents reported that Israeli Apache helicopters were firing over empty fields around Tubas. The Israeli military stated that the blockade was intended to combat resistance fighters. Four nearby towns, including Tamun and Aqaba, were subjected to house-to-house Israeli military patrols. Tubas Governor Ahmed al-Assad denied the Israeli military’s claim, stating, “The Israeli attack has nothing to do with security; it has everything to do with geography.”

== Geography ==
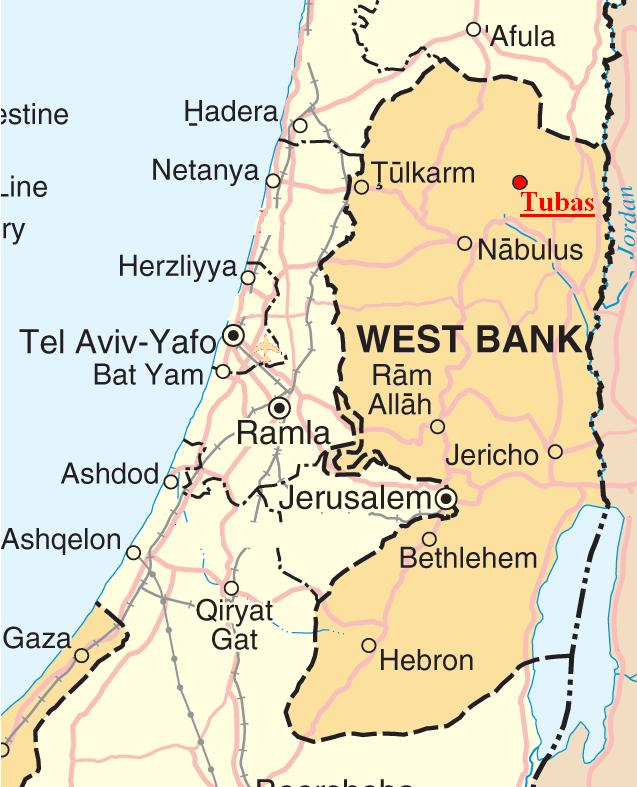
The location of Tubas (marked in red) within the West Bank

Tubas is located in the northern West Bank with an elevation of 362 meters (1,188 ft) above sea level, whereas most of the Tubas Governorate is located within the Jordan Valley to the south. In a 1945 land survey, Tubas along with nearby Bardala and Kardala consisted of 313,123 dunams (31,312 hectares) of which 220,594 was Arab-owned and the remainder being public property. As of 2005, its total land area consists of 295,123 dunams (29,512 hectares), of which 2,271 is classified as built-up, roughly 150,000 used for agricultural purposes and about 180,000 has been expropriated by Israel for military bases and buffer zone.

Tubas is located to the northeast of Nablus, and west of the Jordan Valley. Nearby localities include the town of Aqqaba to the north, Tayasir and Aqabah villages to the northeast, Ras al-Far'a to the southwest, the Palestinian refugee camp of Far'a to the south and the al-Bikai'a village cluster to the southeast.

It has a moderate climate; the summer is hot and dry, and the winter is cold and wet. The average annual temperature is 21 °C (70 °F), and the average annual humidity rate is 56%.

== Demographics ==
About 1,100 residents fled Tubas after the 1967 Six-Day War mostly to the Souf refugee camp in Jordan, while 260 immigrated there and in 1981 its population was 5,300.

In the Palestinian Central Bureau of Statistics' (PCBS) first official census in 1997, Tubas had a population of 11,760 inhabitants. The gender make-up was 50.8% male and 49.2% female. Tubas has an overwhelmingly young population with 52.7% of the city's residents below the age of 20. People between the ages of 20 and 34 constitute 24.7%, 17.7% between the ages of 35 and 64, while people above the age of 64 constituted 4.9% of the population. The census also reported that refugees made up 6.1% of the total residents.

In the 2007 census by the PCBS, Tubas had a population of 16,154, increasing around 33% from 1997. The city represents roughly a third (33.4%) of the Tubas Governorate's total population. The city's modern-era founders, the Daraghmeh clan, constitute 70% of Tubas' inhabitants. The clan has several smaller branches, including the Eweidat, Maslamany, Aryan, Abd al-Razeq and Abu Khazaran families. The Sawafta family make up 25%, the Husheh make up 3% and the Fuquha represent the remaining 2%. Residents of the village trace their origins to various places, including Hebron and Nazareth (the Zuabis). Some are Bedouins.

The inhabitants of Tubas are predominantly Muslims, but there is a community of approximately 60 Palestinian Christians, all belonging to the Greek Orthodox Church. The Christian community worships at the Holy Trinity Church in the city and is serviced by a priest from nearby Zababdeh.

According to the 2017 census by the PCBS, the population of Tubas was 21,431.

== Economy ==
The economical situation Tubas during the 1993–1999 period was prosperous. However, since the start of the Second Intifada in 2000, Tubas' income level has decreased by roughly 40%. Prior to the Intifada, the average household income was 2,500 NIS; it has since receded to about 1,500 NIS. A major factor that has resulted from the conflict was the confiscation of agricultural land located within the city's or its governorate's jurisdiction by Israeli settlements or military authorities. According to the PCBS, in 1999, approximately 52% of the citizens were within the working age (15–64). Of the city's labor force, 48% are female. The unemployment rate increased dramatically from 20% in 1999 to 70% after the year 2000. Prior to the Intifada, 35% of the total labor force worked in Israel.

Currently, agriculture constitutes 60% of Tubas' economic activity, public services comprise 17%, trade is 10%, Israeli labor is 8%, and construction and industry make-up the remaining 5%. In the city, there are 240 shops and stores, and 70 service institutions, as well as one large ready mix concrete factory and 30 small factories.

The main economic sector in Tubas is agriculture. There is a total of 150,000 dunams of arable land, of which 124,450 dunams are covered by forests and 10,604 dunams cultivated. Although the land is fertile, there is a lack of water for irrigation. The only spring used is in nearby Ein Far'a. Field crops account for 49% of the cultivable land, while fruit orchards account for 40% and vegetables make-up 11%. Israeli trenches around the neighboring villages of Ras al-Ahmar and Khirbet al-'Atuf prevent access to nearly 40% of Tubas' arable lands.

Many Tubas residents keep livestock, mostly sheep; in 2005, there were 6,670 sheep. Other livestock include 96 heads of cattle, 880 goats, and 126,500 poultry. In addition, 123 beehives were kept. In 2006, the Golden Sheep Dairy factory was founded in Tubas with help from UCODEP, an Italian NGO. The factory specializes in the production of Italian cheese and primarily targets cosmopolitan consumers in Ramallah, Bethlehem and Jerusalem, as well as international workers and diplomats living in the West Bank.

== Government ==
Tubas serves as the muhfaza ("capital" or "seat") of the Tubas Governorate. Since 1995, Tubas has been located in Area A, giving the PNA full control over its security, administration, and civilian affairs.

Tubas has been governed by a municipal council since 1953, when it was granted permission to do so by Jordanian authorities who controlled the West Bank at the time. The council is made up of 15 members including the mayor, and is headquartered in the municipal hall in the center of the town. The municipality has over 60 employees. Responsibilities of the municipality include civil administration, urban planning and development, social development services, distribution of social services, the issuing of building permits, infrastructural maintenance, water, electricity, and solid waste collection.

Husam Daraghmeh was succeeded, an independent candidate, elected in the 2022 Palestinian municipal elections. During the elections, women won two seats, and though Tubas is normally a Fatah stronghold, all seats were won by independent political lists.

== Education ==
In 2004–2005, Tubas had twelve schools: four for males, three for females, and five co-educational. There were 4,924 students and 191 teachers. In addition, six kindergartens are located in the city and have a total of 620 pupils. In 1997, the literacy rate was 86%; females comprised 78.3% of the illiterate population. Of the literate population, 25.7% completed elementary education, 23.3% completed preparatory education, and 22.1% completed secondary or higher education. Many students throughout the Jordan Valley receive their education in Tubas. The Al-Quds Open University, based in Jerusalem, has a campus in Tubas known as Al-Quds Open University–Tubas Educational Region. In 2006, 1,789 students were enrolled in the university, and it employed 90 professors and 24 other employees.

== Local infrastructure ==
Tubas contains six mosques. The main mosques are the Abd ar-Rahan Mosque, the al-Tawled Mosque, Umar ibn al-Khattab Mosque, and Shaheed Mosque. The Holy Trinity Orthodox Church is also located in Tubas, in the northern part of the city. The church was built in 1976 to serve the small Orthodox Christian community. It consists of a prayer room, a fellowship hall, an office, and a library for children.

Since Tubas is the capital and largest city in the Tubas Governorate, it acts as the main provider of services to the towns and villages of the governorate. All Palestinian National Authority offices that serve the governorate are located in the city. There are 21 government institutions in Tubas, including a post office, the Palestinian Ministry of Labor office, the Palestinian Ministry of Agriculture office, the Palestinian Ministry of Social Affairs office, the fire department,and a police station.

=== Transportation ===
Buses and taxis are the primary means of transportation in Tubas. The total length of paved roads is 10,000 meters (33,000 ft), whereas there are 10,000 meters (33,000 ft) of deteriorating paved roads and 25,000 meters (82,000 ft) of road that are entirely unpaved. Tubas is located on Highway 588 connected to the main Ramallah-Nablus road (Highway 60) by a network of northeastern offshoots of the road, that pass through the villages of Azmut, al-Badhan and Ras al-Far'a. It is connected to Jenin from a northern road which passes through 'Aqqaba, Zababdeh and finally to Jenin. Travel to Jordan is through Highway 57 which is connected with Highway 588 just to the south of Tubas.

=== Health care ===
The city contains five health centers run by various organizations including the Palestinian Red Crescent. There are no hospitals in Tubas, nor in the Tubas Governorate; Residents must travel to Nablus for hospital treatment, but there are two ambulances in Tubas for emergency transportation. There are four clinics in the city: two are run by non-governmental organizations, one is run by the Palestinian National Authority, and one is privately owned. However, these clinics lack modern equipment and specialists. In addition, ten pharmacies exist in Tubas.

=== Utilities ===
Approximately 60% of the residents have a telephone connection, and roughly 90% are connected to running water. The Tubas Municipality administers all water resources in and around the city. In addition to the water network, there is one spring (Far'a) in the immediate area which is the main provider of water for use in households. The city also has a water reservoir with a capacity of 900 cubic metres (31,783 cubic feet). This is primarily used to provide water to the urban areas of the city in the summer, and is only available once per week.

From 1963 to 1997, local municipal-owned electric generators provided Tubas with all of its electricity needs. In 1997, the city connected with the Tubas Area Electricity Network which is provided by the Israel Electric Corporation. In that period, 99% of households in the city were connected with electricity. Solid waste management in Tubas is operated by the municipality and Joint Services Council. It is collected three to four times daily from the residential area and is then sent to a shared dumping site 3 kilometers (1.9 mi) from the city. The main disposal method used is burning. Tubas is not connected to the sewage network, so all households dispose of their waste water in cesspits, which are a major source of pollution in groundwater.

== See also ==
- List of cities administered by the Palestinian National Authority

== Bibliography ==
- Barron, J. B., ed. (1923). Palestine: Report and General Abstracts of the Census of 1922. Government of Palestine.
- Bromiley, G.W. (1995). The International Standard Bible Encyclopedia: E-J. Wm. B. Eerdmans Publishing. ISBN 978-0-8028-3782-0.
- Conder, C.R. (1881). "Lieutenant Conder's reports". Quarterly Statement - Palestine Exploration Fund. 13: 158–208.
- Conder, C.R.; Kitchener, H.H. (1882). The Survey of Western Palestine: Memoirs of the Topography, Orography, Hydrography, and Archaeology. Vol. 2. London: Committee of the Palestine Exploration Fund.
- Dauphin, C. (1998). La Palestine byzantine, Peuplement et Populations. BAR International Series 726 (in French). Vol. III : Catalogue. Oxford: Archeopress. ISBN 0-860549-05-4.
- Doumani, B. (1995). Rediscovering Palestine: Merchants and Peasants in Jabal Nablus. University of California Press.
- Finn, J. (1877). Byeways in Palestine. London: James Nisbet.
- Government of Jordan, Department of Statistics (1964). First Census of Population and Housing. Volume I: Final Tables; General Characteristics of the Population (PDF).
- Government of Palestine, Department of Statistics (1945). Village Statistics, April, 1945.
- Guerin, V. (1875). Description Géographique, Historique et Archéologique de la Palestine. Vol 2: Samarie, pt 2. Paris, Imprimé par autorisation de l'empereur à l'Impr. impériale.
- Hadawi, S. (1970). Village Statistics of 1945: A Classification of Land and Area ownership in Palestine. Palestine Liberation Organization Research Center.
- Hütteroth, W.-D.; Abdulfattah, K. (1977). Historical Geography of Palestine, Transjordan and Southern Syria in the Late 16th Century. Erlanger Geographische Arbeiten, Sonderband 5. Erlangen, Germany: Vorstand der Fränkischen Geographischen Gesellschaft. ISBN 3-920405-41-2.
- Irving, Sarah (2012). Palestine. Bradt Travel Guides. ISBN 978-1841623672.
- Kitchener, H.H. (1878). "Journal of the Survey". Quarterly Statement - Palestine Exploration Fund. 10: 62–67.
- Mills, E., ed. (1932). Census of Palestine 1931. Population of Villages, Towns and Administrative Areas. Jerusalem: Government of Palestine.
- Palmer, E.H. (1881). The Survey of Western Palestine: Arabic and English Name Lists Collected During the Survey by Lieutenants Conder and Kitchener, R. E. Transliterated and Explained by E.H. Palmer. Committee of the Palestine Exploration Fund.
- Pipes, D. (1990). Greater Syria: The History of an Ambition. Oxford University Press. ISBN 9780195363043.
- Rix, Herbert (1907). Tent and Testament : a camping tour in Palestine, with some notes on Scripture sites. London: Williams and Norgate.
- Robinson, E.; Smith, E. (1841). Biblical Researches in Palestine, Mount Sinai and Arabia Petraea: A Journal of Travels in the year 1838. Vol. 3. Boston: Crocker & Brewster.
- Robinson, E.; Smith, E. (1856). Later Biblical Researches in Palestine and adjacent regions: A Journal of Travels in the year 1852. London: John Murray.
