= Tubas Governorate =

Governorate of Palestine

Coordinates: 32°19′26″N 35°29′11.5″E

- Governorate
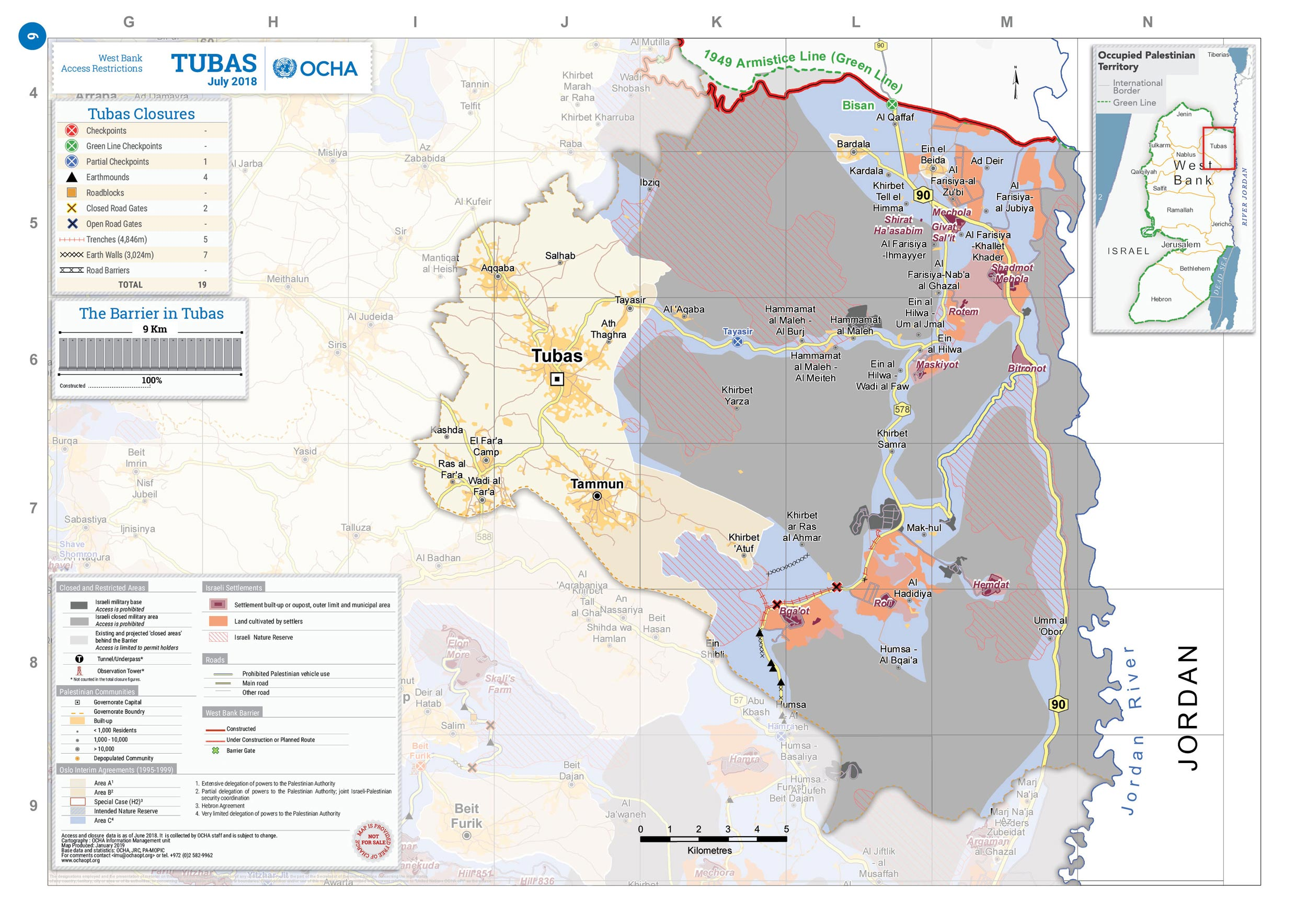
- 2018 United Nations map of the area, showing the Israeli occupation arrangements in the governorate

- Interactive map of Tubas Governorate
- Country: Palestine

Area
  - Total: 372 km^{2} (144 sq mi)

Population (2017)
  - Total: 60,927
- This figure excludes the Israeli West Bank Settlements

The Tubas Governorate (Arabic: محافظة طوباس, romanized: Muḥāfaẓat Ṭūbās) is an administrative district of Palestine, in the northeastern West Bank. Its district capital or muhfaza is the city of Tubas. In 2007, the population was 50,267, raising to 60,927 in 2017.

== History ==
During the Ottoman period, the region later forming the Tubas Governorate belonged to Jabal Nablus. Like other regions of Nablus' peripheral hinterland, it followed the provincial center, led by a closely knit web of economic, social and political relations between Nablus’ urban notables and the city’s surroundings. With the help of rural trading partners, these urban notables established trading monopolies that transformed Jabal Nablus’ autarkic economy into an export-driven market, shipping vast quantities of cash crops and finished goods to off-shore markets. Increasing demand for these commodities in the Ottoman Empire’s urban centers and in Europe spurred demographic growth and settlement expansion in the lowlands surrounding Jabal Nablus.

== Localities ==
There are 24 localities located within the governorate's jurisdiction.

=== Cities ===
- Tubas

=== Municipalities ===
- 'Aqqaba
- Tammun

=== Village councils ===
- Bardala
- Ein al-Beida
- Kardala
- Ras al-Far'a
- Tayasir
- Wadi al-Far'a

=== Village clusters ===
- al-Bikai'a
- Khirbet Simra (Jordan Valley)

=== Refugee camps ===
- Far'a

== See also ==
- Governorates of Palestine
