= Violence against Palestinian journalists =

NGOs and human rights groups have documented violence against Palestinian journalists for decades. Israel, the Palestinian Authority, Hamas, Islamic Jihad and others have utilized violence against Palestinian journalists, which has resulted in Palestine being ranked 156th out of 180 countries in the 2023 Reporters Without Borders' Press Freedom Index.

The Israeli occupation remains the greatest source of violence against Palestinian journalists. Palestinian journalists reporting from the occupied territories have witnessed restrictions and risks, especially during the First and Second Intifadas which started in 1987 and 2000 respectively, and the ongoing Gaza war. The year 2023 saw record numbers of Palestinian journalists arrested and killed by the Israeli military.

Freedom House has stated that in both the West Bank and Gaza Strip, journalists are surveilled and threatened by both Palestinian and Israeli authorities. In 2022, the Palestinian Center for Development and Media Freedom found 605 violations against media freedom, with 69% to Israel.

== Violence from Israel ==
The period of the Second Intifada between 2000 and 2005 put Palestinian journalists and camera operators at heightened risks, including military closures, confiscation of equipment, prevention from reporting on certain incidents and locations, curfews, and arrests. The Committee to Protect Journalists documented that nine Palestinian journalists were killed by the Israeli military between 2000 and 2009, some of them were described as targeted attacks, which Israel denies. The killing of Palestinian-American journalist and Al Jazeera reporter by the Israeli military, Shireen Abu Akleh, in 2022 gained widespread coverage globally; she is widely considered an icon of Palestinian journalism.

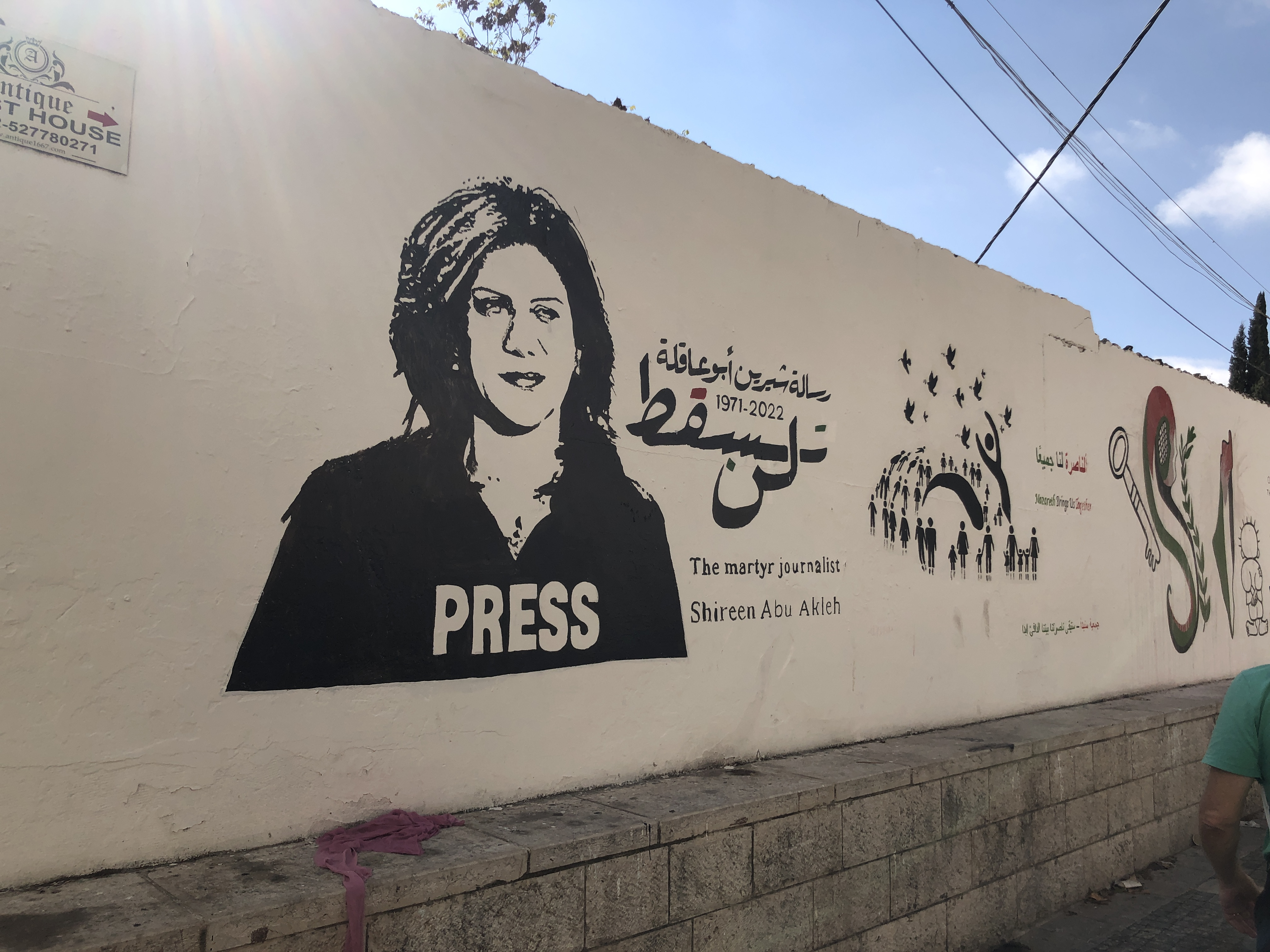
Graffiti of Al Jazeera reporter Shireen Abu Akleh in Nazareth who was killed by the Israeli military in 2022 and is widely considered an icon of Palestinian journalism

The IDF and Israeli settlers regularly uses violence against Palestinian journalists. A CPJ report in 2000 stated that there had been "dozens of violent attacks against Palestinian journalists by Israeli settlers or military forces in the occupied territories (throughout the 1990s)." Human rights groups sent reports to the ICC for 4 journalists who had been killed or injured by the IDF between 2015 and 2019. Reporter Without Borders has sent three complaints to the ICC regarding journalist killings by the IDF since 2018. Media offices were bombed in Gaza in 2021 by the IDF, despite housing multiple press offices. The killing of Shireen Abu Akleh by IDF forces received significant media attention in 2022. A Palestinian media watchdog found 407 violations (~42% physical assaults) against Palestinian journalists by Israeli occupation in 2015. The same watchdog found in their 2022 report, that 416 violations were committed by the Israeli occupation (~29% physical assaults). In 2015, Israeli journalists decried the government closing of Arab news stations serving Palestinians and Arab Israelis.

=== Use of Administrative Detention against Journalists ===
Israel has been claimed to charge Palestinian journalists with incitement for press coverage, usually through administrative detentions. +972 Magazine reported in 2016 that Israeli security forces regularly arrest and use administrative detention against Palestinian journalists for incitement, but do not use administrative detentions against Israeli journalists publishing similarly incendiary materials. In 2016, Palestinian Prisoner Society was quoted as saying that 25 Palestinian journalists were imprisoned, with 7 under administrative detention.

Journalist Muhammad al-Qiq received international attention for protesting his administrative detention in 2016 with a 94-day hunger strike. He was subsequently administratively detained again in 2017 and protested with a 32-day hunger strike.

In August 2025, Israeli forces detained Palestinian journalist Farah Abu Ayash at her home in Beit Umar, located in the West Bank. According to reports, she has been held in solitary confinement for over 100 days without formal charges or trial. Her lawyers and media organizations have expressed concerns about alleged mistreatment and described her detention as part of broader pressures on Palestinian journalists and media activists.

=== 2023 War in Gaza ===
During the 2023 war in Gaza, the IDF has been criticized for its significant killing of journalists in Gaza. The CPJ, in the context of the Gaza war, placed Israel on a list of "worst jailers of journalists".

2023 saw record numbers of arrests of Palestinian journalists by the Israeli military in the Israeli-occupied West Bank, where journalists face risk of assault by the Israeli and Palestinian law enforcements and from attacks by Israeli settlers. The Gaza Strip meanwhile, which has been under Israeli blockade since 2007, is considered to be one of the "most perilous places" to be a journalist, according to the Committee to Protect Journalists. Since the beginning of the Gaza war, which broke out on 7 October 2023, many dozens of Palestinian journalists have been killed by Israel; 70% of journalists killed worldwide in 2023 have been Palestinian. Many of the deaths have been caused by Israeli airstrikes.

== Violence from Palestinian Authority and Palestinian groups ==
Though the Israeli occupation remains the greatest source of violence against Palestinian journalists, Palestinian journalists are also reliant on the PA for financial and political support, which can lead to violence and suppression. The PA received criticism in 2000 for allegedly attempting to censor footage of the Ramallah lynchings. Anecdotes of arrest and interventions (tadakhkhulat) by the PA for unfavorable coverage are common, such as threats, detainments, destruction of equipment or worse. One commentator, Hani al-Masri, states that after the occupation, the second threat against Palestinian journalism is the "split inside the Palestinians [between Fatah and Hamas]", followed by lack of resources and infrastructure. One Palestinian media scholar, Juman Quneis, states that “The laws are too weak to protect anyone, especially journalists. Any security group can go and arrest a journalist from their home without even a warrant, a notice, anything legal.” Human Rights Watch has posted a report documenting several cases of attacks and physical abuse against journalists by the PA. A qualitative study of journalists in the West Bank and Gaza suggests that due to the split, there is a fear of surveillance and censorship by both political parties in the occupied territories.

In 2012, the PA detained journalist Yousef al-Shayeb after he wrote about corruption of the PA diplomatic mission to France.

According to Reporters Without Borders, "Hamas and the Islamic Jihad harass and obstruct journalists suspected of collaborating with Israel". Yasser Murtaja was killed by Israeli fire in 2015, but had previously also been attacked and beaten by Hamas in 2015 while filming. Human Rights Watch has posted a report documenting several cases of attacks and physical abuse against journalists by authorities in Gaza.

== See also ==
- History of Palestinian journalism
- List of journalists killed during the Israeli–Palestinian conflict
- Killing of journalists in the Gaza war
- List of journalists killed in the Gaza war
- Mass media in Israel
- Censorship in Israel
- Media coverage of the Arab–Israeli conflict
- Human rights violations against Palestinians by Israel

== Bibliography ==
- Stein, Rebecca (1 June 2021). Screen Shots: State Violence on Camera in Israel and Palestine. Stanford University Press. ISBN 978-1-5036-2803-8.
- Abualrob, Mohammed; Alkhayyat, Diana (2014). "Case 2: Palestine—New Media, Same Old Political Agenda". In Kalyango, Yusuf; Mould, D. (eds.). Global Journalism Practice and New Media Performance. Springer. pp. 38–49. Archived from the original on 6 April 2024.
