= Ali al-Samoudi =

Palestinian journalist and media correspondent from Jenin

- علي السمودي
- Born: 1966/1967; Jenin, West Bank
- Occupations: Journalist, correspondent, author
- Known for: Veteran reporting on Jenin and the West Bank; survivor of 2022 shooting that killed Shireen Abu Akleh

Ali al-Samoudi (Arabic: علي السمودي; born c. 1967) is a Palestinian journalist and media correspondent from Jenin, best known for his extensive coverage of Israeli military operations in the West Bank and his reporting for both Palestinian and international news organizations. He is a regular contributor to Al-Quds newspaper, has worked with outlets such as CNN, Al Jazeera, Reuters, and the Palestine Chronicle, and co-edited the book Searching Jenin documenting the 2002 events in Jenin.

== Career ==
Al-Samoudi has reported on Israeli military raids, human rights issues, and daily life in Jenin and the wider West Bank for over three decades. He is recognized for his on-the-ground reporting during some of the most intense periods of conflict, often working in hazardous conditions.

He collaborated with Shireen Abu Akleh, the veteran Al Jazeera correspondent who was killed by Israeli fire in May 2022 at the entrance to Jenin refugee camp. Al-Samoudi was present during the incident and was himself shot and wounded in the back.

== Detention and targeting ==
On April 29, 2025, Israeli forces detained al-Samoudi during a predawn raid on his son's home in Jenin. According to his family, he was interrogated for about thirty minutes and then transferred to an Israeli hospital after his health deteriorated, but authorities did not disclose the hospital's name or his condition.

The Israeli military accused him of affiliation with the Palestinian Islamic Jihad and of facilitating the transfer of funds, though no evidence was provided. His family and colleagues have strongly denied these allegations, noting that he has never previously faced such accusations in his lengthy career.

His detention has been condemned by the Palestinian Journalists' Syndicate, the National Union of Journalists, and international press freedom organizations, who view it as part of a broader pattern of targeting Palestinian journalists in the West Bank.

== Previous incidents ==
Al-Samoudi has been detained and threatened multiple times by Israeli forces while reporting in Jenin. In addition to the 2022 shooting, he has previously been stopped, interrogated, and had his equipment confiscated.

== Publications ==
- Co-editor (with Ramzy Baroud): Searching Jenin (documenting the 2002 Israeli incursion in Jenin)

== Impact and recognition ==
Al-Samoudi is widely respected among Palestinian and international journalists for his commitment to covering events in Jenin and the risks he has endured. His reporting has contributed to global understanding of the situation in the West Bank and the challenges faced by journalists in conflict zones.

== See also ==
- Shireen Abu Akleh
- Killing of Shireen Abu Akleh
- Violence against Palestinian journalists
- Media coverage of the Gaza war
