= Shatha Hanaysha =

Palestinian journalist (born 1993)

- شذى حنايشة
- Born: 1993 (age 32–33); Qabatiya, Jenin, occupied West Bank
- Citizenship: Palestine
- Education: Bachelor's degree in Media, Arab American University; Master's in Media Studies, American University of Beirut (in progress)
- Occupations: Journalist, Photojournalist
- Years active: 2015–present
- Known for: Reporting on Israeli military raids in Jenin, eyewitness to the killing of Shireen Abu Akleh

Shatha Hanaysha (Arabic: شذى حنايشة; b. 1993) is a Palestinian journalist and photojournalist from Qabatiya, near Jenin in the occupied West Bank. She is known for her ongoing coverage of Israeli military attacks in Palestine, particularly in Jenin, and for being an eyewitness to the killing of veteran Al Jazeera journalist Shireen Abu Akleh in 2022. Hanaysha's report on documenting the daily lives of Palestinians under Israeli occupation, combining on-the-ground reporting with photography to portray both the resilience and challenges faced by her community.

== Early life and education ==
Shatha Hanaysha was born in 1993 in Qabatiya, a town south of Jenin in the occupied West Bank. Growing up in a region marked by frequent Israeli military incursions, she was inspired to pursue journalism by late journalist Shireen Abu Akleh, whose reporting on Qatari news organization Al Jazeera Media Network became a fixture in Palestinian households. Hanaysha earned a bachelor's degree in Media in Palestine and is currently pursuing a master's degree in Media Studies at the private university in Lebanon American University of Beirut.

== Career ==
Hanaysha began her journalism career in 2015 and gained recognition from both Palestinian and international audiences for her reporting under dangerous conditions, working as a field reporter and photojournalist for various news outlets, including Middle East Eye, The New Arab, Ultra Palestine, Truthout and Mondoweiss. Her reporting primarily was occupied West Bank, covering Israeli military raids, Palestinian resistance, and the socio-political dynamics of life under occupation. She has documented significant events, including large-scale Israeli operations in Jenin, such as raids and demolitions in the Jenin refugee camp.

In addition to her written journalism, Hanaysha is an accomplished photojournalist. Her photography, often showcased in exhibitions, captures the everyday lives of Palestinians in the West Bank and the role of women in Palestinian society and the impact of occupation. In April 2024, she presented her work at an exhibition in Beirut in the resilience and fragility of life in Jenin.

Hanaysha has also contributed to discussions on the role of journalism in Palestinian resistance. In September 2023, she spoke at an event hosted by Al-Awda NY in New York City, titled Reporting Under Fire: The Threat to Palestinian Journalism, where she discussed the dangers faced by Palestinian journalists.

=== Killing of Shireen Abu Akleh ===
On 11 May 2022, Hanaysha was reporting alongside Al Jazeera Arabic journalist Shireen Abu Akleh in the Jenin refugee camp when Israel Defense Forces opened fire on their group, despite the journalists wearing clearly marked "PRESS" vests. Abu Akleh was fatally shot in the head, and Hanaysha witnessed the incident, later recounting the harrowing experience in interviews and articles. She described being unable to reach Abu Akleh due to continued gunfire, which also targeted her as she sought cover. Another journalist, Ali al-Samoudi, was injured in the same incident. Hanaysha alleged that Israeli forces prevented ambulances from reaching Abu Akleh, delaying rescue efforts.

The killing of Abu Akleh caused international outrage, and Hanaysha's eyewitness account became a critical part of the incident. She has since vowed to honor Abu Akleh's legacy by continuing her work as a journalist, despite the risks. In a 2023 interview with the Committee to Protect Journalists, Hanaysha spoke of Abu Akleh's profound influence, noting that she was a role model for her and many other Palestinian women in journalism.

== Personal life ==
Hanaysha has faced significant risks in her work, including being targeted by Israeli forces during raids. She has cited Shireen Abu Akleh as a major influence and stated how Abu Akleh's bravery and professionalism inspired her career choice. She often described human cost of Israeli military assault, including stories of Palestinian prisoners, families, and communities. Her photography including Jenin, Unscorched Earth has documenting Palestinian determination.

Several times she faced under the threat of violence, censorship, and restrictions imposed by Israeli government.

== Other works ==
Since November 2023 she is active contributor of American news website Mondoweiss.

=== Tours ===
Hanaysha attended Palestinian Journalists Under Fire and Palestine Writes in 2023 as part of her U.S. speaking tour, organized trips by Al-Awda Palestine Right to Return Coalition and the Palestinian Youth Movement in New York and Anaheim.
