= Lina Abu Akleh =

Palestinian human rights advocate

- لينا أبو عاقلة
- Born: April 17, 1995 (age 31); Jerusalem, Israeli-occupied West Bank
- Citizenship: State of Palestine; Armenia
- Education: American University of Beirut (BA in Political Studies); University of San Francisco (MA in International Studies)
- Occupation: Human rights advocate
- Years active: 2022–present
- Employer: Various human rights organizations
- Organization: Advocacy groups for Palestinian rights
- Known for: Advocacy for Palestinian human rights, seeking justice for Shireen Abu Akleh's killing, and international activism
- Notable work: Testimony before the United Nations Human Rights Council; Advocacy efforts with the U.S. Department of State; Meeting with Pope Francis
- Relatives: Shireen Abu Akleh (aunt)
- Awards: BBC 100 Women (2022); Time 100 Next (2022)

Lina Abu Akleh (Arabic: لينا أبو عاقلة) is a Palestinian human rights advocate. As the niece of Shireen Abu Akleh, a journalist shot dead by Israeli forces in 2022, Lina Abu Akleh has campaigned for justice for her aunt, and for issues affecting Palestinians more generally. This has included petitioning the United States Government to open its own investigation into the death of her aunt, as well as meeting Secretary of State Antony Blinken. In October 2022 she met with Pope Francis at a memorial Mass for her aunt.

Abu Akleh was named one of the BBC's 100 Women in 2022 and she was also listed as one of the Time 100 Next List for 2022. Her inclusion on the Time 100 list was as a result of her "publicly demanding scrutiny of Israel's treatment of Palestinians".

== Early life ==
Abu Akleh was to born to a Palestinian father and an Armenian mother. She grew up in Jerusalem. She has a BA in political studies from the American University of Beirut. Her MA is in International Studies and was awarded by the University of San Francisco.
