= Mondoweiss =

American news website

- Type: News website
- Format: Online
- Publisher: Scott Roth
- Editor-in-chief: Philip Weiss; Adam Horowitz
- Founded: March 2006
- Political alignment: Anti-Zionism; Progressivism
- Language: English
- Headquarters: United States
- OCLC number: 1413751648
- Website: mondoweiss.net

Mondoweiss is an anti-Zionist news website based in the United States, founded by Philip Weiss. In 2010, Weiss described the website's purpose as one of covering American foreign policy in the Middle East from a "progressive Jewish perspective". In 2011, it defined its aims as fostering greater fairness for Palestinians in American foreign policy, and as providing American Jews with an alternative identity to that expressed by Zionist ideology, which he regards as antithetical to American liberalism.

== History and staff ==
Mondoweiss began in March 2006 as a blog written by Philip Weiss on the The New York Observer website, focusing on what in his "mind were 'Jewish issues': the Iraq disaster and my Jewishness, Zionism, neo-conservatism, Israel, Palestine." In spring 2007, Weiss parted ways with the Observer and re-launched the blog as an independent website. Adam Horowitz subsequently joined as co-editor.

Originally supported by The Nation Institute, it became a project of part of the Center for Economic Research and Social Change in June 2011. In July 2012, Mondoweiss formed a content-sharing partnership with Salon.

Regular contributors have included Helena Cobban, Dareen Tatour, Steven Salaita, and Shatha Hanaysha.

== Reception ==
In March 2007, Gary Kamiya, in an article for the website Salon, wrote that Mondoweiss offered "informed and passionate discussions" of what Weiss stated were "delicate and controversial matters surrounding American Jewish identity and Israel". Kamiya wrote that Weiss, "routinely skewers attempts by mainstream Jewish organizations and pundits to lay down the law on what is acceptable discourse". As an example he mentioned Weiss' exploration of "off-limits" topics like dual loyalty, as in an incident regarding the American Jewish Committee. Weiss had written that a Committee piece accusing Jewish intellectuals who did not "toe the party line on Israel" of being "self-haters" only revealed the "anti-intellectual, vicious, omerta practices of the Jewish leadership".

In 2009, Michael Massing, in an article titled "The News About the Internet" for The New York Review of Books, noted that "Weiss is one of several friends I've seen flourish online after enduring years of frustration writing for magazines. With its unrelenting criticism of Israel, his site [Mondoweiss] has angered even some of his fellow doves, but it has given voice to a strain of opinion that in the past had few chances of being heard." In November 2009, former United States Senator James G. Abourezk praised Weiss and Horowitz for their courage in taking on "what most believe is an unassailable, monolithic pro-Israel Lobby". In September 2010, James Wolcott of Vanity Fair argued that Mondoweiss "is one of the most invaluable sites in the blogosphere, a blast of sanity and moral suasion against the prevailing demonization of anything and anyone perceived as anti-Israel".

In 2010, Mondoweiss was criticized by the Jerusalem Center for Public Affairs for publishing a series of cartoons which they stated expressed "anti-Israelism, a more recent category of anti-Semitism". Between 2010 and 2011, Tablet magazine published three articles in which Mondoweiss and other blogs, were criticized. The articles described Weiss as a "Jew-baiter" and "intensely anti-Israel", saying his site was "obsessed with Israel and the machinations of the U.S. Israel lobby" and laden with "sweeping and unsubstantiated rhetoric". Weiss responded to allegations in Tablet, by stating that the magazine had "smeared" him and several other bloggers as Jew-baiters. Walt stated that Smith's article contained "not a scintilla of evidence" that "Weiss or I have written or said anything that is remotely anti-Semitic, much less that involves 'Jew-baiting'. There's an obvious reason for this omission: None of us has ever written or said anything that supports Smith's outrageous charges."

In 2012, the Algemeiner Journal described Mondoweiss as "Purveyors of Anti-Semitic Material". According to Algemeiner and the Anti-Defamation League, Mondoweiss and Philip Weiss have received grants from Ron Unz's Unz Foundation. Armin Rosen, a Media Fellow with The Atlantic, criticized Peter Beinart's blog, Open Zion (which appears in The Daily Beast) for publishing an article by Alex Kane because he is Mondoweiss's "Staff Reporter". Rosen wrote that "Mondoweiss often gives the appearance of an anti-Semitic enterprise." Robert Wright, a Senior Editor at The Atlantic, responded to Rosen's article, writing "This tarring of Kane by virtue of his association with Mondoweiss would be lamentable even if Rosen produced a convincing indictment of Mondoweiss, showing that it indeed evinces anti-Semitism". Wright described Mondoweiss as "an edgy website that is highly critical of both Israel and Zionism" and said that, based on the evidence provided by Rosen, he could not see how Rosen reached his conclusion about Mondoweiss. James Fallows, a national correspondent for The Atlantic concurred with Wright's response to Rosen. Alex Kane, Adam Horowitz, and Philip Weiss responded in Mondoweiss arguing that Rosen's article, "is about nothing more than policing the discourse on Israel".

Later in 2012, the Algemeiner Journal published another article criticising Mondoweiss for its associations with Judith Butler because of her comments describing Islamist movements, including those of the militant variety such as Hamas and Hezbollah, as "social movements that are progressive, that are on the Left, that are part of a global Left". In 2013, Peter Beinart, writing for The Daily Beast, accused Mondoweiss of "ignoring human rights abuse unless it can be linked to America or capitalism or the West", and said that "By admitting that they're more interested in human rights violations when Israel commits them than when Hamas does, Horowitz and Roth are implying that they don't really see human rights as universal". Later in the year Commentary magazine accused Mondoweiss of being complicit in an "effort to delegitimize Jewish rights".

Also in 2013, the Israeli newspaper Haaretz described Mondoweiss as "a progressive Jewish website". Journalist Bradley Burston, writing for Haaretz, described Mondoweiss as "avowedly anti-Israel" in reference to its coverage of the 2014 kidnapping and murder of Israeli teenagers. In 2015, David Bernstein, writing for The Washington Post, called the website a "hate site", and listed quotes from Weiss that he said were antisemitic. This included Weiss' claim that "the Israel lobby ... reflected a contract the American establishment had made with Jews to drive the economy in the 1970s", which Bernstein likened to a belief in an "Elders of Zion type group". It was also described as a hate site in the book Anti-Zionism on Campus by Andrew Pessin. In 2018, Israeli journalist Amira Hass cited Mondoweiss as a must-read venue for those wanting to understand Israeli policy regarding Palestinians.
