= IDF admissions to misconduct after initial denials =

The Israel Defense Forces (IDF), the military forces of the State of Israel, has on several occasions been involved in incidents that resulted in accusations of misconduct or potential breaches of international law. In some instances, initial official statements or denials were later revised following internal investigations, which subsequently acknowledged wrongdoing or provided more clarity on events.

== Qibya massacre (14 October 1953) ==
In October 1953, Israeli troops led by Ariel Sharon, under Operation Shoshana, or Qibya massacre, attacked the village of Qibya in the West Bank, then controlled by Jordan. Over sixty-nine Palestinian villagers, primarily women and children, were killed. Israeli forces framed this operation as a retaliation for the Yehud attack, where an Israeli mother and her two children were killed. Numerous structures, including forty-five houses, a school, and a mosque, were destroyed in Qibya. The incident garnered international attention, being condemned by institutions such as the United States Department of State and the United Nations Security Council. Initially, Israeli officials denied military involvement, suggesting it was the act of enraged civilians.

In the wake of international criticism, Israel eventually acknowledged that the attack on Qibya was approved by its leadership. However, they contested the reported death toll. Ariel Sharon, who played a pivotal role in the operation, defended it by asserting that it was a necessary retaliation for previous terror attacks against Israelis.

== Kafr Qasim massacre (29 October 1956) ==
On 29 October 1956, during the Kafr Qasim massacre, Israeli border police killed 48 Arab civilians, including women and children, who were returning home from work in the village of Kafr Qasim. The villagers were unaware that a curfew had been imposed earlier that day amid tensions surrounding the Suez Crisis. Israel immediately imposed a military censorship blocking all media reporting on the event. For months, the government denied responsibility and refused access to the village.

After two months of protests led by Arab Knesset members, Israel finally lifted the media blackout. An inquiry found that border police shot the villagers under orders from commanders to kill anyone violating the curfew. In 1958, courts martial convicted a number of officers of murder, though their prison sentences were soon controversially reduced by appeals and presidential pardons. The key outcome was the landmark ruling that soldiers have a duty to disobey manifestly illegal orders. The court found the "shoot to kill" order blatantly unlawful.

== Khan Yunis massacre (3 November 1956) ==
On 3 November 1956, during the Suez Crisis, the Israel Defense Forces carried out operations in Khan Yunis in the Gaza Strip, as well as the neighboring Khan Yunis refugee camp. The IDF, in what is known as the Khan Yunis massacre, shot dead hundreds of Palestinian civilians during house raids ostensibly aimed at militants. Israel's initial statements claimed that most of the deaths occurred during armed clashes with militants or Fedayeen fighters. The government strongly denied any unlawful killings of civilians by its troops.

A United Nations report estimated that 275 Palestinians were killed in Khan Yunis. Palestinian eyewitnesses described summary executions and mass shootings of civilians. In 2004, IDF veteran accounts published in the Israeli press confirmed that a civilian massacre was perpetrated by Israeli soldiers in Khan Yunis. Israel eventually acknowledged that there was a massacre of civilians occurred based on these IDF accounts, overturning its initial claims that deaths occurred during armed clashes.

== Usage of white phosphorus in Operation Cast Lead (2008–2009) ==
In December 2008, Israel launched a major military offensive in Gaza known as Operation Cast Lead, aimed at Hamas and other militant groups. During the 3-week operation, there were numerous reports by UN officials, human rights groups, and journalists on the ground claiming Israel had used white phosphorus munitions in densely populated areas of Gaza. Such usage is restricted under international law due to the indiscriminate and horrific burns white phosphorus causes on contact with skin. Initially, Israeli officials categorically denied that its forces used white phosphorus weapons in Gaza at all.

In January 2009, after accumulating evidence made clear white phosphorus shells were extensively fired in Gaza, the IDF finally admitted to using the munition. However, it claimed the white phosphorus shells were only used to create smokescreens per international law, not as an incendiary weapon against people. Rights groups disputed this, citing evidence of white phosphorus burns on injured civilians.

== Beitunia killings (15 May 2014) ==
On 15 May 2014, two 17-year-old Palestinian teenagers, Nadeem Nawara and Mohammad Salameh, were shot dead by Israel Defense Forces (IDF) soldiers during annual Nakba Day protests outside Ofer Prison in the West Bank. Multiple eyewitnesses and video footage clearly showed the two teens were unarmed when fatally shot. However, Israeli officials initially denied that any live ammunition was used against the demonstrators. They instead claimed the cause of death was unknown, questioned the evidence, and stated only non-lethal methods were used to disperse protesters.

Following months of international pressure and scrutiny, Israel finally admitted in November 2014 that live ammunition had been used, contrary to its initial categorical denials. Forensic evidence matched a bullet to the rifle of an Israeli border policeman. He was arrested and charged with shooting and killing Nadeem Nawara. In 2018, the officer pleaded guilty to causing death by negligence for the accidental live fire shooting.

== Killing of Shireen Abu Akleh (11 May 2022) ==
On 11 May 2022, renowned Palestinian-American Al Jazeera journalist Shireen Abu Akleh was shot and killed while reporting on an early morning Israeli military raid at the Jenin refugee camp in the occupied West Bank city of Jenin. Abu Akleh, who was wearing a helmet and vest clearly marked "Press," was with a group of journalists when she was fatally shot in the head. The Israeli Defense Forces initially denied that its soldiers were responsible for her death. Israeli officials claimed she could have been killed by indiscriminate Palestinian gunfire during clashes with IDF troops, calling her death a tragedy in the fog of war.

After over four months of widespread condemnation, multiple international probes finding Israel responsible, and growing accusations of a cover-up, Israel finally admitted in September 2022 that there was a "high probability" Abu Akleh was mistakenly shot by one of its soldiers during the Jenin raid.

== Death of five Palestinian children in Gaza airstrike (7 August 2022) ==
On 7 August 2022, an Israeli airstrike on Jabalia refugee camp in the Gaza Strip killed five Palestinian children aged 3 to 16. The children were killed when a missile struck outside their home. The Israel Defense Forces initially claimed the children were likely killed by a failed rocket launch from Palestinian Islamic Jihad (PIJ) militants in the area. Israel denied its forces were responsible.

However, the IDF later opened an investigation which found no PIJ rockets had been fired from the vicinity at the time. The investigation conclusively determined Israeli fighter jets had conducted the airstrike that resulted in the deaths of the five children. An IDF official admitted the military's initial claim blaming PIJ rocket misfire was incorrect.

== Rafah paramedic massacre (23 March 2025) ==
On 23 March 2025, the IDF fired on five ambulances and a fire truck "one by one." The humanitarian vehicles were "crushed and dumped, covered in sand" in an apparent attempt to cover up the killings, while the aid workers, wearing uniforms, were left missing in a mass grave for eight days. The ambulances were initially dispatched to the Al-Hashashin area in response to casualties caused by Israeli attacks on the area, before being surrounded by Israeli troops and losing contact with dispatchers. The paramedics that went to search for them were killed and wounded.

Israel initially said the vehicles were "advancing suspiciously" without headlights or emergency signals. It claimed that the vehicles were being used as cover by Hamas and Palestinian Islamic Jihad. It alleged that among those killed were a Hamas operative and "eight other terrorists," without providing evidence. A video recording discovered on a cellphone of one of the medics contradicts Israel's narrative of the incident, showing the ambulances and fire truck clearly marked with their emergency lights on as Israeli troops hit them with a barrage of gunfire, killing all the medics. Following the release of the video recording, Israel changed its account of the incident, admitting that its soldiers have "made mistakes."

== Nasser Hospital strikes (25 August 2025) ==
On 25 August 2025, an IDF double tap strike hit the Nasser Hospital in Khan Yunis, killing 22 people, including 5 journalists. The attack also claimed the lives of medical staff, a paramedic, and other civilians, with approximately 50 others wounded. The first strike targeted the hospital's top floor. A second strike hit the area as rescue workers and journalists arrived. An investigation by BBC Verify, published on 29 August, concluded the hospital was struck at least four times rather than twice, as initially reported.

Shortly after the strikes, Israeli officials indicated that troops from the Golani Brigade reported a "Hamas camera" that was near the hospital and was used for directing militant activity against the IDF. Officials did not provide any evidence, nor explain why the strikes occurred or if there had been any attempt to determine if the camera was being operated by a reporter or Hamas. After international outcry, IDF investigators alleged 6 people who were killed in the attack were Hamas militant, providing names. A subsequent investigation by Associated Press noted inconsistencies in the claim, including that Israel provided no evidence for the allegations; one of the named individuals did not appear on the hospital's casualty list and doctors said no one by that name was killed; two others identified were a health care worker at Nasser Hospital and a driver for Gaza's Civil Defense; and authorities did not clarify whether any of the six were killed in the initial strike or identified among the crowd before the second strike. Israeli Prime Minister Benjamin Netanyahu's office later described the incident as a "tragic mishap", and the IDF announced an inquiry. The IDF said it regretted "any harm to uninvolved individuals and does not target journalists as such." Netanyahu's office did not provide a similar apology in Hebrew.

== See also ==
- Accusation in a mirror
- Hasbara
- Israeli war crimes
- Propaganda and psychological warfare in the Gaza Wars
