= Killing of Shireen Abu Akleh =

2022 killing of a Palestinian journalist

- Part of the Israeli–Palestinian conflict
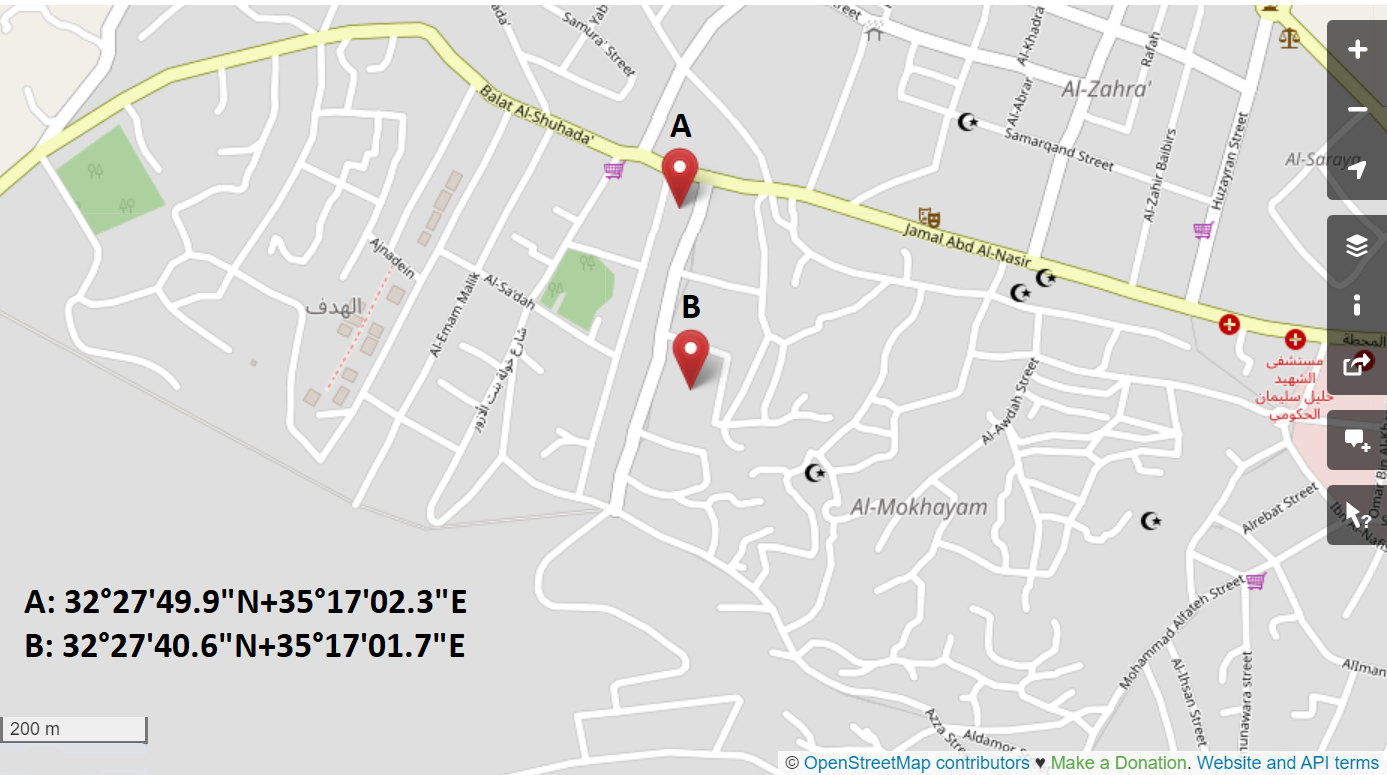
- Pin A: Location where Abu Akleh was standing before being shot Pin B: Location where the gunfire came from, based on an incident report by the Israeli human rights organization B'Tselem
- Location: 32°27′50″N 35°17′3″E; Jenin refugee camp
- Date: 11 May 2022; 4 years ago c. 7:08 a.m. (EEST)
- Weapons: Caliber 5.56 mm, M4 (e.g., M4 carbine)
- Deaths: 1 (Shireen Abu Akleh)
- Injuries: 1 (Ali al-Samoudi)
- Perpetrator: Israel Defense Forces
- No. of participants: Alon Scagio
- Motive: Unknown

On 11 May 2022, Palestinian-American journalist Shireen Abu Akleh was shot and killed by Israel Defense Forces while covering a raid at the Jenin refugee camp. Witnesses, along with the Qatari media network Al Jazeera, for which Abu Akleh had worked for 25 years, reported that an Israeli soldier shot her in the head. After the shooting, she was taken to the local Ibn Sina Specialized Hospital, where medical personnel pronounced her dead.

Her killing sparked outrage among Palestinians and garnered international attention. Abu Akleh's status as an American citizen prompted the United States to become involved in the investigation. Initially, Israel claimed that she had been killed by "indiscriminate" gunfire from Palestinian militants engaged in combat with Israeli troops. However, they later stated that there was a "high possibility" that Israeli gunfire had "accidentally" hit Abu Akleh while she was at the camp. At the time of her death, she was wearing a blue vest with "PRESS" written in blue letters, which is standard for civilian journalists reporting in combat zones.

== Killing ==
At 7:04 AM on Wednesday, 11 May 2022, Al Jazeera announced that their correspondent, Shireen Abu Akleh, had been injured after being shot by Israeli Defense Forces while covering their incursion and raid on the Jenin camp.

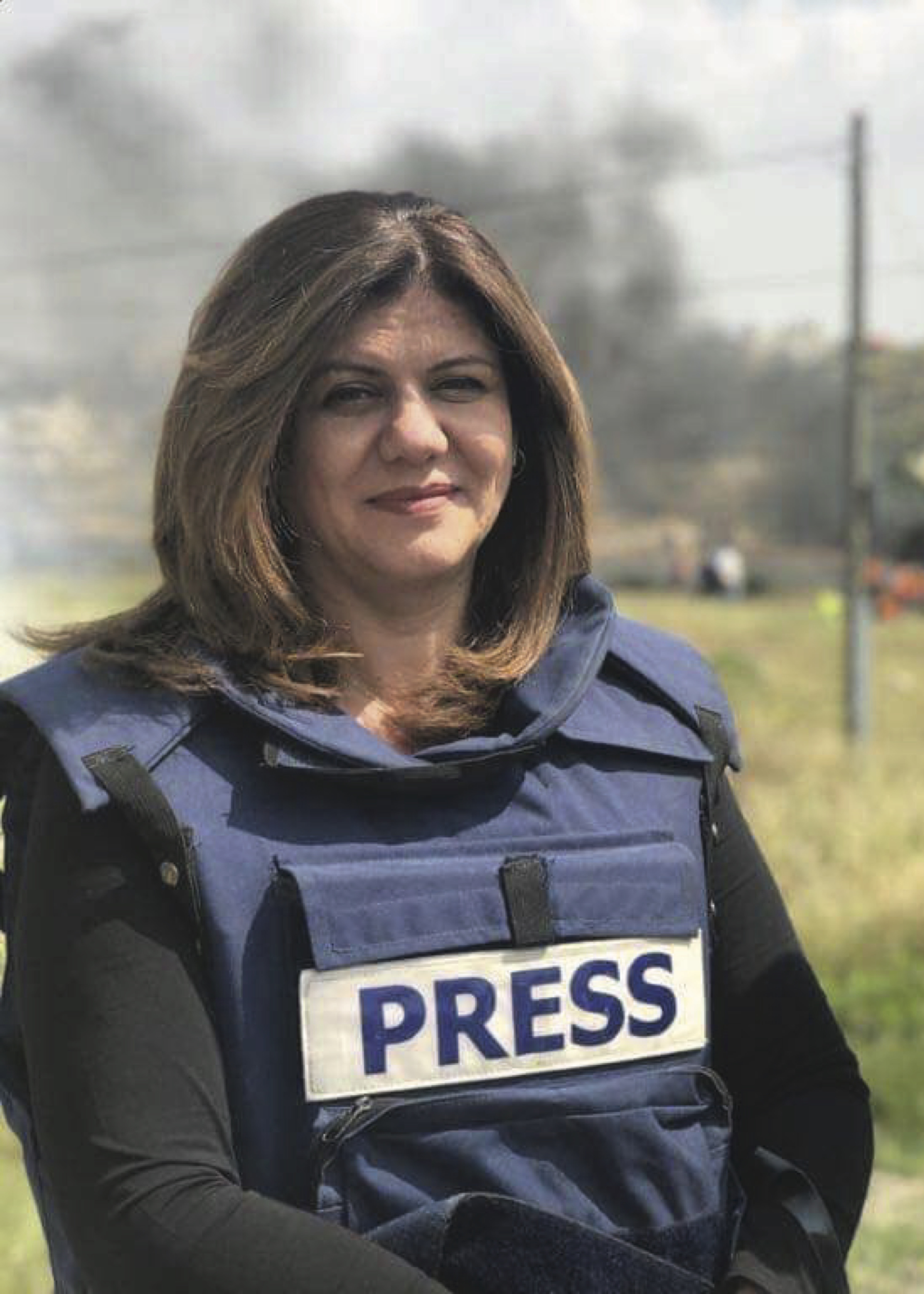
Shireen Abu Akleh wearing a press vest, as she was wearing when killed

Al Jazeera stated that Shireen was targeted by the Israeli army despite wearing a press vest. They described the incident as "In a tragic act of murder that violates international laws and norms, the Israeli occupation forces have assassinated Shireen" and condemned it as "atrocious". Reports later emerged that Israeli forces deliberately targeted the Al Jazeera crew while they were waiting for the media team in an open area. The forces began firing intensively, even though there had been no gunfire from Palestinians in that vicinity. A Palestinian journalist and colleague of Abu Akhleh, Shatha Hanaysha, alleged that Israeli forces prevented ambulance vehicles from reaching Abu Akleh for rescue. Ali al-Samoudi, another Al Jazeera journalist who was with Abu Akleh, was shot in the back during the incident but survived. He later stated that Abu Akleh had been "cold-bloodedly killed" and that IDF troops continued to fire while she lay on the ground.

External Video
- A video from Al-Jazeera shows the first moments after the targeting of journalist Shireen Abu Akleh by the Israeli defence forces on YouTube

In contrast, the Israeli newspaper Haaretz reported that Israeli forces initially claimed, "We don't think we killed" Abu Akleh, attributing her death to "indiscriminate" Palestinian gunfire and alleging that responsibility lay with Palestinian militants who opened fire on Israeli soldiers, prompting a retaliatory response. However, multiple eyewitnesses reported that the area was calm before her death and rejected the Israeli statements regarding her killing. Four days later, Haaretz quoted an Israeli official who admitted that "an Israeli soldier opened fire about 190 meters away from Shireen Abu Akleh, and that he was sitting in a jeep armed with a rifle with a telescopic lens, and he may have been the one who hit her."

Al Jazeera's Walid Al-Omari, the director of the channel's office in the Palestinian territories, stated that there had been no gunfire from Palestinian militants. He also confirmed that Abu Akleh was wearing a helmet and had been struck in an exposed area below her ear, indicating that she had been deliberately targeted. Post-shooting video footage clearly showed that she was wearing a blue press vest marked with the word "Press".

=== Autopsy ===
The director of the Institute of Forensic Medicine at An-Najah National University, Ryan Al-Ali, who performed autopsy on Abu Akleh's body confirmed that there was no evidence indicating that the gunfire came from a distance of less than a meter. Additionally, a deformed projectile was preserved for laboratory examination. The director of the Forensic Medicine Institute in Nablus affirmed that the bullet that struck Abu Akleh was fired directly and fatally into her head. Hours after Abu Akleh's death, Israeli police forcibly entered her residence in Jerusalem, dispersing the gathering outside and using physical force against the demonstrators.

=== Funeral ===
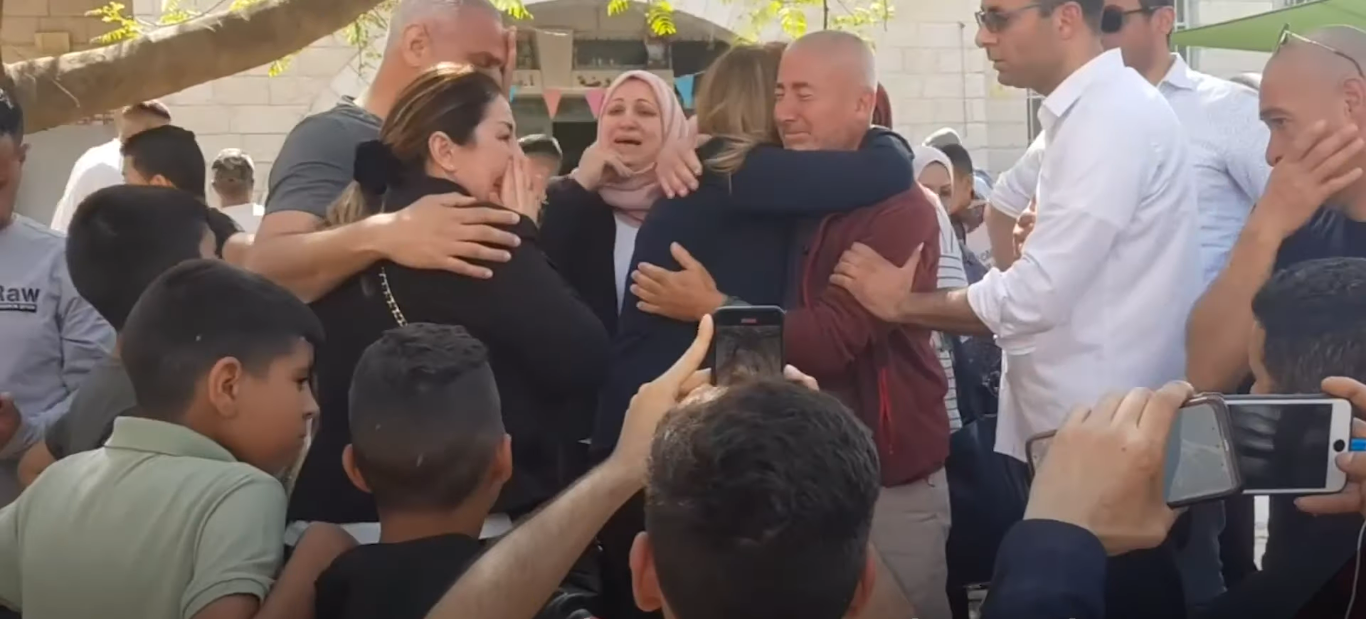
Abu Akleh's funeral in Jenin

Shireen Abu Akleh's body was transported to the Latin Church in Jenin for funeral prayers before being moved from the Forensic Medicine Institute in Nablus to Ramallah at 3:30 PM local time. Abu Akleh's body arrived at Al Jazeera's office in Ramallah after approximately an hour and a half. It was announced that her funeral ceremony would take place the following day, starting from the Palestinian Presidential Headquarters in Al-Bireh city.

At 10:00 AM on Thursday, 12 May, an official procession was held to honor Abu Akleh at the Palestinian Presidency in Ramallah in preparation for her transfer to Jerusalem. Israeli authorities obstructed the funeral procession as it made its way toward Jerusalem. The body arrived after about two hours, and an official farewell ceremony took place despite the Israeli police surrounding several mourners in front of St. Joseph's Hospital, Jerusalem.

Reports indicated that Israeli forces prevented the display of Abu Akleh’s pictures in the Old City of Jerusalem. Her brother, Tony Abu Akleh, stated that authorities prohibited Palestinian flags from being displayed inside the family home. On Friday, 13 May, a large gathering displaying Palestinian flags was held in front of the French Hospital in Jerusalem, where her body had been kept before the funeral. Police surrounded the hospital, closed nearby roads and entrances, and deployed reinforcements in the area.

Al Jazeera correspondent Givara Budeiri reported that Jerusalem police insisted the funeral be conducted without Palestinian flags and that the body be transported by mortuary vehicle. However, mourners insisted on carrying the body on foot. The funeral procession began at 2:00 p.m. from St. Joseph's Hospital, Jerusalem toward the Roman Catholic Church in Jerusalem. Video footage from the scene reportedly showed Israeli forces attempting to disrupt the procession, including physically beating mourners and nearly causing the coffin to fall.

After the police suppression of funeral, the body was taken out of the hospital a second time, this time by hearse. Israeli police once again intercepted the vehicle, removed the Palestinian flag, and blocked mourners from participating. The procession arrived at the Catholic Church at 2:30 pm, where the memorial service began, despite renewed police assaults on participants. Police erected barriers on the route to the cemetery, hindering access as the body was transported from the church to Mount Zion cemetery in Jerusalem. She was buried at around 5:00 pm beside her parents.

== Investigations ==
=== Media investigations ===
==== Haaretz ====
The Palestinian forensic medicine continued its investigations and collection of evidence into Abu Akleh's death, while the Israeli newspaper Haaretz quoted a preliminary investigation of the Israeli army that Shireen was 150 meters away from the Duvdevan Unit – an elite unit in the Israeli army. Dozens of bullets were fired, and the newspaper itself confirmed that the bullet that hit Shireen was of 5.56 mm caliber and was fired from an M4 carbine. Additionally, Haaretz stated that some bullets from the Israeli Duvdevan Unit soldiers were fired toward the north where Abu Akleh was located. Haaretz once again quoted Israeli politician Nachman Shai as saying, "Israel's credibility in the killing of Shireen Abu Akleh is not high." The newspaper affirmed that, with her death, "Shireen has become a symbol of the brutality of the Israeli occupation and the violation of press freedom." They elaborated that "the Israeli army and police do not enjoy the confidence of the Palestinians and the world in terms of protecting Palestinian journalists" and that "Israel itself did not provide any evidence that its soldiers did not shoot Shireen Abu Akleh."

Haaretz quoted an Israeli official on 15 May admitting that an elite Israeli soldier in a jeep, armed with a rifle with a telescopic sight, may have been the person who killed Abu Akleh. According to the Israeli official, the soldier accused of assassinating Shireen said during his interrogation that he did not see her and did not know that he had shot her.

==== The Wall Street Journal ====
The Wall Street Journal published a lengthy investigation in which it relied on the opinions of an unnamed Israeli official who stated that it cannot be ruled out that the bullet that killed Abu Akleh was fired from the Israeli side. They also reaffirmed to her the results of the initial investigation, some of which had been published by Haaretz, and said that it would be difficult to determine who was responsible for the killing of the Palestinian journalist without obtaining the fatal bullet.

==== CNN ====
CNN also published its report, quoting eyewitnesses who confirmed to it that the Israeli soldiers shot the journalists, including Abu Akleh, and that there were no Palestinian gunmen at the scene of the killing. The Washington Post quoted an Israeli official as saying that the army is investigating 3 shootings by its soldiers. As for the Hebrew Walla website, the Israeli army confirmed, at this stage, that its forces had mistakenly targeted Abu Akleh. On the other hand, the commander of the Israeli Central Command admitted that the Israeli soldiers fired indiscriminately in several places, but he denied knowing the exact cause of Abu Akleh's injury, although he did not rule out any possible cause, as he put it.

CNN published an independent report based on the evidence it collected and said that this evidence confirmed that there were no gunmen or armed confrontations near Abu Akleh during the moments before her killing. The same investigation also confirmed that Shireen was targeted by the Israeli forces, and concluded that analyzing the traces of bullets in the tree in which she took shelter indicates that she was deliberately targeted. The investigation of the American network showed that the shooter was between 177 and 197 meters away from the place where Shireen Abu Akleh fell.

==== The New York Times ====
The New York Times editorial department criticized the passage of three weeks since Abu Akleh's death without the initiation of external and official investigations, stressing that the world knows little about who was responsible for the killing of Abu Akleh. Then, it demanded again the necessity of conducting an independent investigation with American, Israeli, and Palestinian participation to establish the facts of the killing of Shireen. Stressing that it is best for the Palestinian Authority, Israel and the United States to agree on an independent investigator to determine who killed Shireen.

On 20 June 2022, The New York Times published the results of a lengthy investigation into the circumstances of Abu Akleh's killing. The investigation concluded that the bullet that killed Shireen was fired from the location where the Israeli military convoy was located, and also confirmed that the bullet was most likely fired by a soldier from the elite forces. In its investigation, The New York Times also confirmed that the evidence it collected confirms that there were no Palestinian gunmen near the place where Abu Akleh was killed and that the same collected evidence proves that the Israeli army fired 16 bullets from the position of its forces at the site where Shireen and some journalists were present, which contradicts the Israeli narrative.

=== Government investigations ===
==== United Nations ====
The Office of the United Nations High Commissioner for Human Rights also published the results of its investigation, which showed that Abu Akleh was killed by a bullet fired from the direction of the Israeli forces. The United Nations office urged Israel to conduct a criminal investigation into her death, although Israel had previously flatly refused to do so. The Israeli army responded to the UN commission's report as biased. It renewed their demand for the Palestinians to hand over the bullet that killed Abu Akleh and confirmed that their preliminary investigation determined that the shooting of the Palestinian journalist was not intentional, but it does not confirm that she was killed by an Israeli soldier. Amnesty International responded by calling for an independent and impartial international investigation into the killing of Abu Akleh as a war crime.

==== Refusal of criminal investigation ====
On 19 May, Haaretz announced, quoting official sources in the Israeli army, that the latter refused to open a criminal investigation into the circumstances of the killing of Shireen Abu Akleh. The same source also confirmed that "there are no criminal suspicions in Shireen's death, and we do not want the investigation to lead to disputes within the army and society." The Israeli army confirmed, in an official response, what was reported by the Hebrew newspaper Haaretz, where it published a statement stating that "there is no way at the present time to open a criminal investigation into the circumstances of the killing of Shireen Abu Akleh."

On 2 July, the Palestinian Public Prosecutor announced the refusal of the Palestinian Public Prosecution to hand over the bullet that killed Shireen Abu Akleh to the Israeli side. But Israel agreed to the US side doing a forensic examination of the bullet. About 24 hours later, the Israeli army announced its intention, in the presence of an American, to examine that bullet, adding in its statement: "If it turns out that we killed Shireen, we will bear the responsibility and we will regret it."

Israeli Prime Minister Yair Lapid stated in a press conference that "there was no intention to kill journalist Shireen Abu Akleh," stressing at the same time that "Israel expresses regret over her death." On the other hand, Shireen's family called on the United Nations and the International Criminal Court to take immediate measures to achieve justice. Later, the Palestinian Public Prosecutor confirmed that the projectile had been handed over to the US security coordinator for 24 hours to examine and return it as it is, but he denied that the American forensic analysis had any impact on the case file and the extensive investigations led by the Palestinian Public Prosecution, stressing that there is a "clear bias" in the American report. For the Israeli side, there are facts presented as incomplete.

==== The official investigation of Israel ====
On 5 September 2022 – about 4 months after Abu Akleh's killing – the Israeli army announced that "the military prosecutors did not find any violation that requires opening a criminal investigation into the killing of Abu Akleh" or the soldier who may have shot her "accidentally" and killed her. Al Jazeera Network responded to the results of the Israeli investigation with a statement in which it stated that "the Israeli tacit and hesitant confession is intended to evade criminal responsibility for the killing of Shireen Abu Akleh." Abu Akleh's family also published a statement in response to the Israeli army's statement, which it said was "an attempt to obscure the truth and evade responsibility", stressing that "Israel refused to assume its responsibility, and this confirms that war criminals cannot investigate their crimes....", adding that they would continue to pressure for a comprehensive and independent US investigation.

==== First Public Prosecution of Palestinian ====
In its preliminary investigation, a Palestinian Public Prosecution confirmed that the only source of fire at the moment Shireen was injured was from the Israeli forces, and that the direct cause of her death was brain damage from a high-speed projectile. It also confirmed "the continuation of the investigation procedures into the heinous crime committed by the occupation forces".

==== Official Palestinian investigation ====
The Palestinian Public Prosecutor announced the results of the official investigation on 26 May, confirming that the IDF fired at the journalists, including Shireen, without any prior warning. The investigation revealed that the bullet that killed the Palestinian journalist contained an armor-piercing iron part that lacerated Shireen's brain, and she died promptly. The Palestinian Public Prosecutor added, in the context of the findings of the official Palestinian investigation, that the bullet bore features and characteristics indicating that it was fired from a sniper weapon and that the source of the fire was south of Shireen Abu Akleh's whereabouts, i.e. the place where the Israeli forces were stationed. The investigation concluded that the targeting of Abu Akleh and the journalists near her was deliberate and that the Israeli forces continued to shoot at everyone who tried to help Abu Akleh. Accordingly, the facts, according to the Public Prosecutor, provide the elements of the crime of the premeditated murder of Abu Akleh and the attempted murder of Ali al-Samoudi.

The Palestinian Public Prosecutor confirmed the prosecution's decision not to show the image of the bullet that killed Abu Akleh to prevent the Israeli from manipulating and changing its story, according to the statement, adding that the investigation into the killing was purely Palestinian without any external participation, except for the American side, which was briefed on aspects of the investigations of the Palestinian Public Prosecution. But he did not interfere in its procedures. The Palestinian Attorney General ruled out the Israeli version that spoke of Palestinian shootings because, according to him, the facts disprove. Immediately after the results of the official investigation were issued, Al Jazeera Network decided to refer the file on Abu Akleh's killing to the Prosecutor of the International Criminal Court. Where the network formed an international legal alliance that included its legal team and other international experts to prepare a complete file for submission to the court's prosecutor, and the legal file of the International Criminal Court, according to Al Jazeera, will include the Israeli bombing that targeted the network's office in Gaza and entirely demolished in May 2021.

== Western media coverage ==
Avatar of The New York Times

The New York Times
(@nytimes)
tweeted:

English:

Correction: An earlier tweet misstated Al Jazeera's comments about the death of Shireen Abu Akleh. The network said she was killed by Israeli forces in the West Bank city of Jenin; it did not say she was killed during clashes between Israeli forces and Palestinian gunmen.

11 May 2022

After Al Jazeera announced the killing of its journalist Shireen Abu Akleh by IDF, The New York Times published an article on its official website and a tweet on its official Twitter account. They also shared posts on their social media accounts regarding the article, which carried the title...''AI Jazeera said one of its journalists was killed in the West Bank city of Jenin during clashes between Israeli forces and Palestinian gunmen''. The article sparked controversy, and the American newspaper soon modified some of the paragraphs of the article as well as the title. It also deleted the tweet, issuing a correction.

The Financial Times published a brief article on Shireen's point of issue ''Veteran Al Jazeera journalist shot dead in West Bank''. The British BBC titled, in an article, ''Violence breaks out at funeral of reporter Shireen Abu Akleh in East Jerusalem''.

Forbes newspaper published an article that was part of its title, "hit in the head by a bullet" as it contented itself with basing the title on anonymously and did not indicate the party behind the injury or the reason. Following criticism of this, Forbes amended the headline of the article to "Al Jazeera Journalist Shot and Killed While Covering Israeli Raid in West Bank." Reuters also published an article in which it described the assaulting Shireen's coffin bearers as "Clashing". They would later amend the article and publish an apology on its official Twitter account, where it stated this time that "Israeli police beat mourners at funeral of slain Palestinian journalist", based on video clips from the scene.

== Ramifications ==
The IDF continued their incursions, as on Friday morning they stormed the outskirts of Jenin camp, the place where Shireen was assassinated, and armed clashes broke out between the townspeople and the soldiers. Security forces fired shells at the house of the Al-Dubai family in the camp, resulting in the injury of 3 Palestinians. Violence escalated as Israeli forces continued to attack the townspeople, especially when they targeted an ambulance belonging to Ibn Sina Specialized Hospital. The Palestinian Ministry of Health announced that 13 injuries had arrived at hospitals in Jenin, including two critical injuries. While the Hebrew newspaper, Yedioth Ahronoth, announced that a soldier from the Israeli Al-Yamam unit was seriously injured, and the Hebrew Channel 11 confirmed the news of the officer's death during clashes with Palestinians in Jenin, when the IDF stormed the city. Later, the Palestinian Ministry of Health announced the news of the death of Daoud Al-Zubaidi from the Jenin camp, killed as a result of bullet wounds he sustained two days prior. Daoud's family accused Israeli forces of deliberately killing him, especially that he is the brother of Zakaria, a leader in the Fatah movement, and one of the prisoners who participated in the operation known as the Gilboa Prison break. On the morning of Wednesday, 18 May, armed clashes erupted between Palestinians and the Israeli Defense Forces in the Jenin camp, when Israeli military patrols stormed the camp and surrounded and stormed a number of houses. It also arrested 17 Palestinians, according to the Palestinian Prisoners Club, in different areas of the West Bank.

== Who Killed Shireen? ==
According to the documentary Who Killed Shireen? by Zeteo in May 2025, the Israeli soldier who fatally shot Palestinian-American journalist Shireen Abu Akleh in May 2022 was identified as Alon Scagio, a member of the Israeli military's elite Duvdevan Unit. The film presents evidence suggesting that Scagio fired the shot that killed Abu Akleh while she was reporting in Jenin, despite her being clearly marked as press with visible protective gear. The documentary also reveals that Scagio was promoted to captain after the incident and was later killed in combat during a military raid in Jenin in June 2024. Interviews with his fellow soldiers indicate that he did not express significant remorse over the shooting.

According to the filmmakers, Israel was immediately aware that one of its soldiers had shot Shireen despite their public attempts to blame Palestinians. The film also claims that the US investigation determined that Shireen was shot intentionally but that the Biden administration rejected that finding. According to Israeli soldiers interviewed in the investigation, Scagio's colleagues subsequently used Shireen's picture for target practice.

== Reactions ==
=== Al-Jazeera Media Network ===
In a statement from Al Jazeera Media Network, it said:

In a tragic murder that violates international laws and norms, the Israeli occupation forces assassinated our correspondent, Shireen Abu Akleh, in cold blood.

The network media condemned "this heinous crime, through which it is intended to prevent the media from carrying out its message", and added:

We hold the Israeli government and the occupation forces responsible for the killing of the late colleague Shireen.

The statement called on the international community to "condemn and hold the Israeli occupation forces accountable for deliberately targeting and killing colleague Shireen Abu Akleh", adding that witnesses claimed Israeli forces fired live bullets at the demonstrators and press crews, shooting Aby Akleh even though she was dressed in a press jacket.

=== Local ===
==== Palestine ====
The Palestinian Presidency condemned what it called "the crime of execution by the occupation forces of journalist Shireen Abu Akleh" and held the Israeli government responsible for this crime. The Islamic Jihad Movement in Palestine mourned the "distinguished Palestinian journalist Shireen Abu Akleh after she was exposed to direct bullets from the occupation during its storming of the Jenin camp."

The Popular Front for the Liberation of Palestine also condemned the "assassination of the martyr Shireen Abu Akleh, which aims to kill the truth conveyed by the media about the crimes and racism of the occupation". While the Democratic Front for the Liberation of Palestine said, "The murder of journalist Shireen Abu Akleh confirms the extent of Israel's disregard for world public opinion and international values and norms." In a statement, the Palestinian Prime Minister stated that the killing was "a black day for the press in the world and for every free person". The Palestinian Foreign Ministry directed a circular to the Palestinian embassies urging immediate action to expose the crime of execution of journalist Shireen Abu Akleh, and confirmed that it "will follow up, in coordination with the Journalists Syndicate and human rights organizations, this heinous crime in preparation for its submission to the International Criminal Court". She later added, after the Israeli calls for a joint investigation into the death of journalist Shireen Abu Akleh, that these calls are a clear attempt to cover up the crime, and she called on the international community and the competent courts to hold accountable and prosecute the Israeli war criminals as she described them in her statement.

==== Israel ====
Israeli Prime Minister Naftali Bennett said, "There is a high probability that the Palestinian journalist, who was killed after being shot during an Israeli military operation in the West Bank, may have been killed by Palestinian fire." Then the Israeli government quickly retracted its first position when the Israeli Chief of Staff stated in an official statement that "it is not possible to determine the direction of the fire that targeted Shireen Abu Akelah, and we regret her death, and a special team has been appointed to investigate." This was after he and other Israeli officials, including the chief, had initially denied Ministers and the Israeli army standing behind the operation. Israeli Defense Minister Benny Gantz held a new press conference in which he expressed his regret over the killing of the Al Jazeera journalist and asked the Palestinians to hand over the bullet that caused her death. He also promised to open a thorough investigation, insisting again that the initial indications do not indicate that the Israeli army soldiers opened fire.

The Israel Defense Force has highly involved itself in destroying memorials to Abu Akleh. On 26 October 2023, a memorial erected at the site of her killing was bulldozed and desecrated by Israeli soldiers. On 22 September 2024, Israeli forces raided and shut down the Ramallah office of Al Jazeera that Abu Akleh had worked for, and involved soldiers went out of their way to tear down a poster of her.

Following a lawsuit filed by Al Jazeera at the International Criminal Court, Israeli Prime Minister Yair Lapid said, "No one will interrogate IDF soldiers and no one will preach to us about morals of combat."

=== International ===
Nations

- Qatar: The Qatari Foreign Ministry condemned "in the strongest terms the assassination of the media occupation forces, Shireen Abu Akleh".
- Netherlands: The Dutch Foreign Minister published a statement in which he said he was "shocked by the tragic death of Al Jazeera journalist Shireen Abu Akleh"..
- United States: The US Embassy in Israel published a statement in which it said: "We are deeply saddened by the loss of the American-Palestinian journalist Shireen Abu Akleh, and we offer our condolences to her family, colleagues, and friends in the Al Jazeera network and the Palestinian community," adding that "the United States supports press freedoms and the protection of journalists while performing their duties."
  - The United States House of Representatives observed a minute of silence in mourning for the soul of Shireen Abu Akleh.
  - Thomas R. Nides, the U.S. ambassador to Israel, expressed his sorrow upon learning about the passing of Shireen Abu Akleh, an American and Palestinian journalist. In a tweet, he conveyed his condolences and called for a comprehensive investigation into the circumstances surrounding her death, as well as the injury of at least one other journalist in Jenin,

Ambassador Tom Nides
(@USAmbIsrael)
tweeted:

Very sad to learn of the death of American and Palestinian journalist Shireen Abu Akleh of

@AJArabic

@AJEnglish

. I encourage a thorough investigation into the circumstances of her death and the injury of at least one other journalist today in Jenin.

11 May 2022

- Jordan: The Jordanian Foreign Minister condemned in the strongest terms the killing of the Palestinian journalist Shireen Abu Akleh in occupied Jenin and stressed that "the killing of the journalist is a heinous crime and a flagrant attack on the freedom of the press, and the perpetrators must be held accountable."
- Libya: The President of the High Council of State in Libya, Khalid al-Mishri condemned in the strongest terms the "assassination of the Palestinian journalist Shireen Abu Akleh by the Israeli occupation forces".
- Oman: The Omani Foreign Minister, Sayyid Badr Albusaidi stated, "The killing of journalist Shireen Abu Akleh is an outrageous and unacceptable act, and we express our sympathy and condolences to her family."
- Pakistan: The Prime Minister of Pakistan, Imran Khan strongly condemned the killing.
- Kuwait: The Kuwaiti Ministry of Foreign Affairs denounced "the assassination of Palestinian media figure Shireen Abu Akleh by the Israeli occupation forces" and called on the international community to open an investigation "to hold the perpetrators of this heinous crime accountable and prosecute them before the international justice authorities".
  - The Speaker of the Kuwaiti National Assembly affirmed that "the killing of the brave journalist, Shireen Abu Akleh, by the occupation's bullets, is a new witness to the falsehood of his claims and the weakness and humiliation of the Israeli entity."
- Iran: The Iranian Foreign Affairs spokesman Saeed Khatibzadeh said "Shireen Abu Akleh's killing was a crime committed by the Israeli entity, which is a violation of international law and an attack on media freedom."
- Belgium: The Belgian Foreign Ministry condemned the killing of Abu Akleh and offered its condolences to her loved ones. It also called for a swift and firm investigation, adding that the freedom of the press and the security of journalists must be protected always and everywhere.
- Djibouti: The Minister of Foreign Affairs of Djibouti condemned Abu Akleh's killing.
- Egypt: The Egyptian Ministry of Foreign Affairs condemned in the strongest terms what it described as "the heinous murder of Shireen, the Palestinian journalist of Al Jazeera".
- Afghanistan: The Afghan Ministry of Foreign Affairs strongly condemned the Israeli deliberate killing of Al Jazeera correspondent Shireen Abu Akleh in Palestine, as it described it.
- Germany: The German Foreign Ministry published a statement saying that the reports received about the murder of journalist Shireen Abu Akleh are very shocking to the German government.
- France: The French Foreign Ministry published a statement saying, "The killing of Shireen Abu Akleh is very shocking, and we condemn it, and we demand a transparent investigation into the circumstances of the killing."
- Lebanon: The Lebanese Prime Minister published a statement saying: "We salute the spirit of colleague Shireen Abu Akleh, and her martyrdom is a medal of pride on the forehead of the Palestinian people who face the occupation with courage and determination."
- Switzerland: The Swiss Foreign Ministry stressed the need to ensure the protection and safety of journalists and to conduct a thorough investigation into the killing of Abu Akleh.
- Spain: The Spanish Foreign Ministry strongly condemned the killing of journalist Shireen Abu Akleh and demand an investigation and respect for freedom of the press and the work of journalists.
- Canada: The Canadian Foreign Minister called for a detailed investigation into the murder of Shireen Abu Akleh and stressed the guarantee of the rights and safety of journalists around the world.
- Italy: The Italian Foreign Ministry stated that it feels deep dissatisfaction with the killing of Shireen Abu Akleh, adding that protecting freedom of the press is essential and it is necessary to determine who is responsible and put an end to the violence.
- Ireland: Irish T.D. and activist Richard Boyd Barrett condemned the killing of Abu Akleh. He demanded an investigation into the incident.
- Argentina: The Argentine Foreign Ministry condemned "the assassination of journalist Shireen Abu Akleh while practicing her journalistic work". It also condemned the Israeli police attacks on her funeral, calling for an independent investigation to clarify what happened.

=== International humanitarian organizations ===
The UNICEF spokeswoman in the Middle East stated "Farewell, Voice of Palestine, and thank you very much for your courage, objectivity, and journalistic professionalism." The International Federation of Journalists stated in an official statement that "the testimonies of the journalists who were accompanied by Shireen Abu Akleh confirm that her targeting was deliberate and systematic," and added that "journalists wearing precisely defined press jackets were targeted by Israeli snipers." The Iraqi Journalists Syndicate also condemned the assassination of journalist Shireen Abu Akleh and called for an urgent international investigation to uncover the perpetrators.

The National Union of Journalists in Britain published a statement declaring its shock at the killing of Abu Akleh by Israeli forces while she was covering the Jenin raids. Likewise, the Federation of Arab Journalists did, which condemned "with all force the heinous crime of the Israeli antagonist, which resulted in the martyrdom of the Palestinian journalist Shireen Abu Akleh", and "held the Israeli occupation fully responsible for this heinous crime against freedom of the press". It also called for "an international investigation that a delegation would attend to reveal About the circumstances of this horrific crime".

The Tunisian Syndicate of Journalists stated in a report: "We were shocked by the liquidation of the Palestinian journalist Shireen Abu Akleh while she was covering the Israeli raid of the Jenin camp. This heinous crime is an additional link in the chain of targeting the brave journalists in Palestine by Israeli settlers." The Union of German Journalists stressed the need to hold the killer(s) of Abu Akleh accountable as soon as possible and to clarify the circumstances of her death. The International Committee of the Red Cross published a statement in which it stated the following: "We are shocked by the news of the killing of journalist Shireen Abu Akleh, and we express our deepest condolences to her family, friends, and colleagues... The exact details of her killing must be clarified." The Director General of Reporters Without Borders confirmed that the killing of Shireen Abu Akleh is a serious violation of the Geneva Conventions and the UN Security Council Regulations on the Protection of Journalists.

The International Federation of Journalists submitted a project to the International Criminal Court on the systematic and repeated targeting of Palestinian journalists to consider the targeting of Palestinian journalists as a war crime. A statement from Al-Azhar condemned "the assassination of the Zionist entity, journalist Shireen Abu Akleh, and we demand that the killers be brought to justice". The Yemeni Journalists Syndicate also condemned what it described as the "deliberate assassination" of Abu Akleh by "soldiers of the usurping Zionist entity", as stated in its statement. The Egyptian Journalists Syndicate called for an international investigation into the crime. The National Syndicate of Moroccan Press, also condemned the assassination.

The Euro-Mediterranean Human Rights Monitor published a report on the day following Shireen's assassination, documenting the Israeli army's targeting of the Palestinian journalist during her fieldwork with a bullet to the head despite her wearing a shield with the press insignia on it. The helmet she was wearing, and at the end of the report, the Monitor called for an independent international investigation into the case, stressing that the Israeli army continued to shoot anyone who tried to approach or rescue her for several minutes.

Human Rights Watch published a lengthy statement in which it emphasized that "Israel's promises of investigation are empty, and human rights groups have long documented how their investigations are closer to image-polishing protocols." The Israeli human rights center, B'Tselem, investigated the killing of the Palestinian journalist, which showed, according to the organization, a contradiction between the Israeli army's version of what happened. The United Nations Human Rights Council stated that it was "appalled by the killing of journalist Shireen Abu Akleh while she was covering an Israeli military operation in Jenin", and urged an independent and transparent investigation into her killing, and stressed that the issue of impunity must end, according to the United Nations. "Attacking journalists is an attack on freedom of expression, and defending the press is a defense of democracy."

The BDS movement has drawn attention to the killing of Abu Akleh, advising the governments of the United States, the UK, and the European Union to stop regretting her death and start condemning and punishing the killers.

== Gallery ==
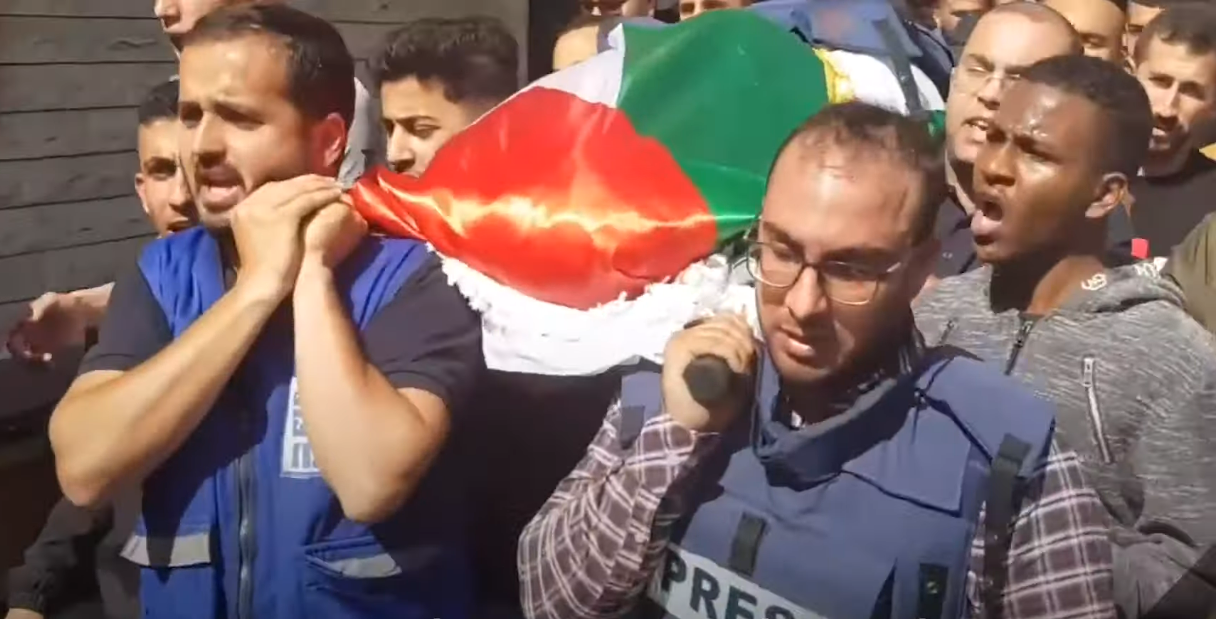
Colleagues of Shireen Abu Akleh at her funeral in Jenin.

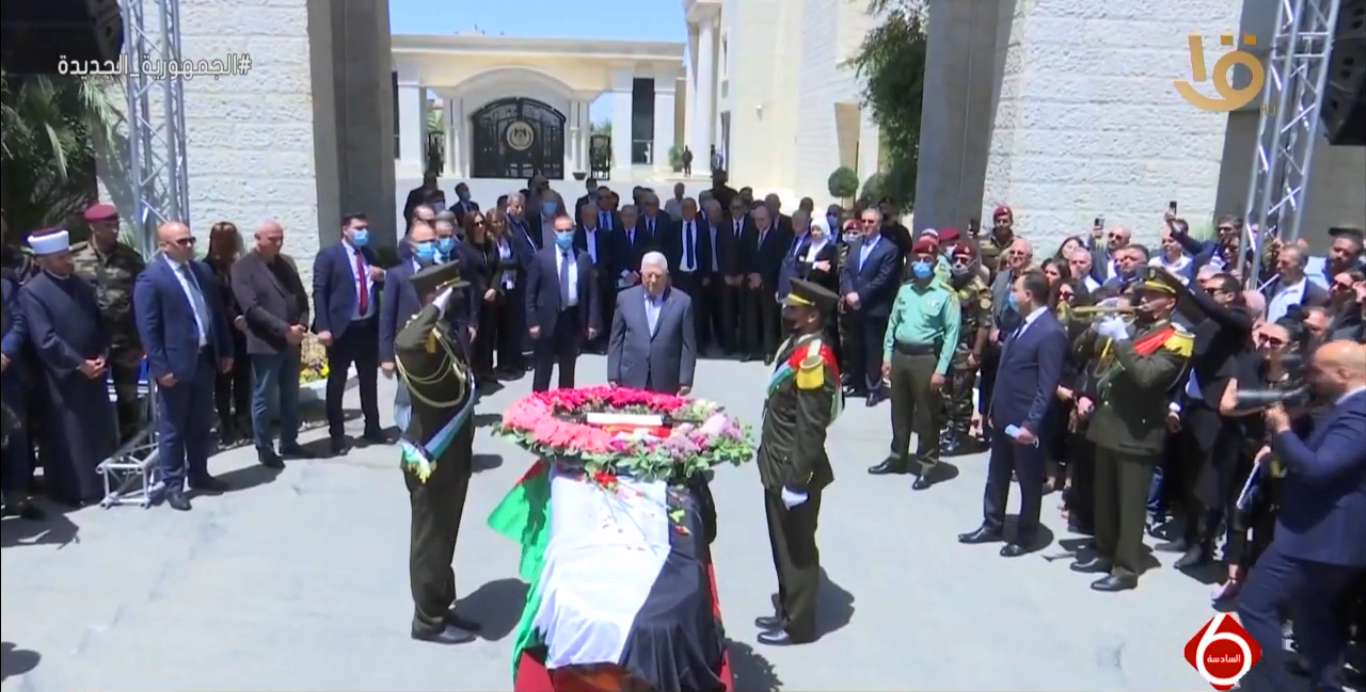
Mahmoud Abbas witnesses Shireen Abu Akleh's official funeral.

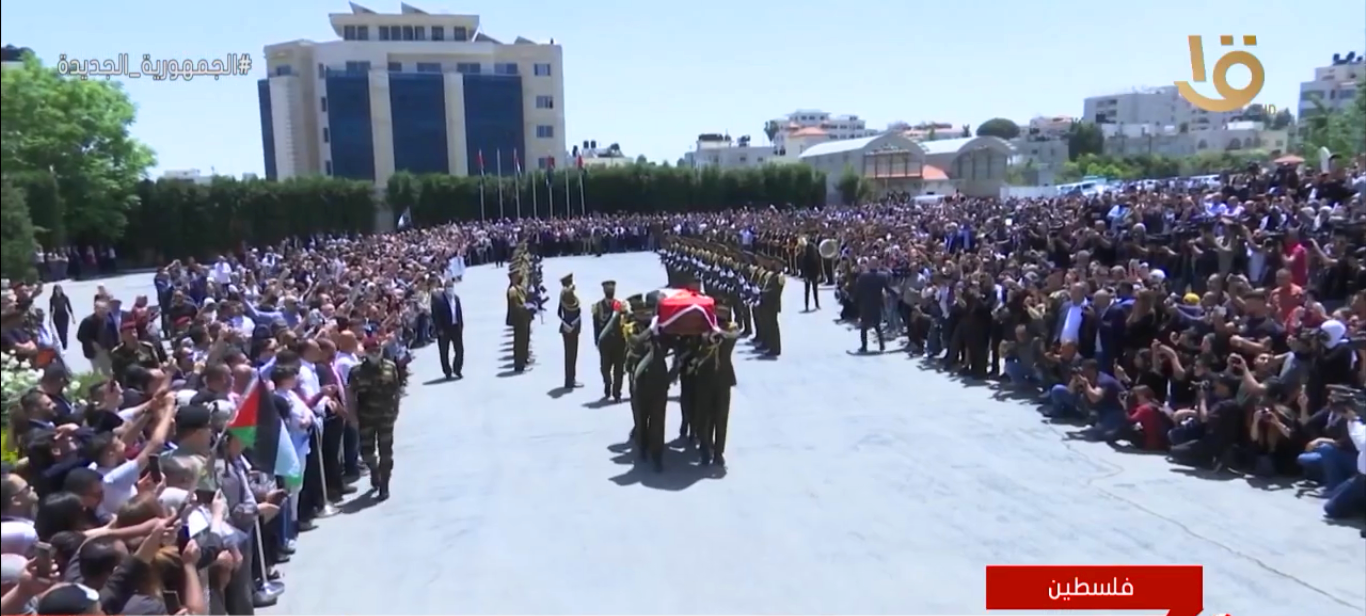
Soldiers carry the coffin of Shireen Abu Akleh at the state funeral from the Palestinian Presidency Palace.

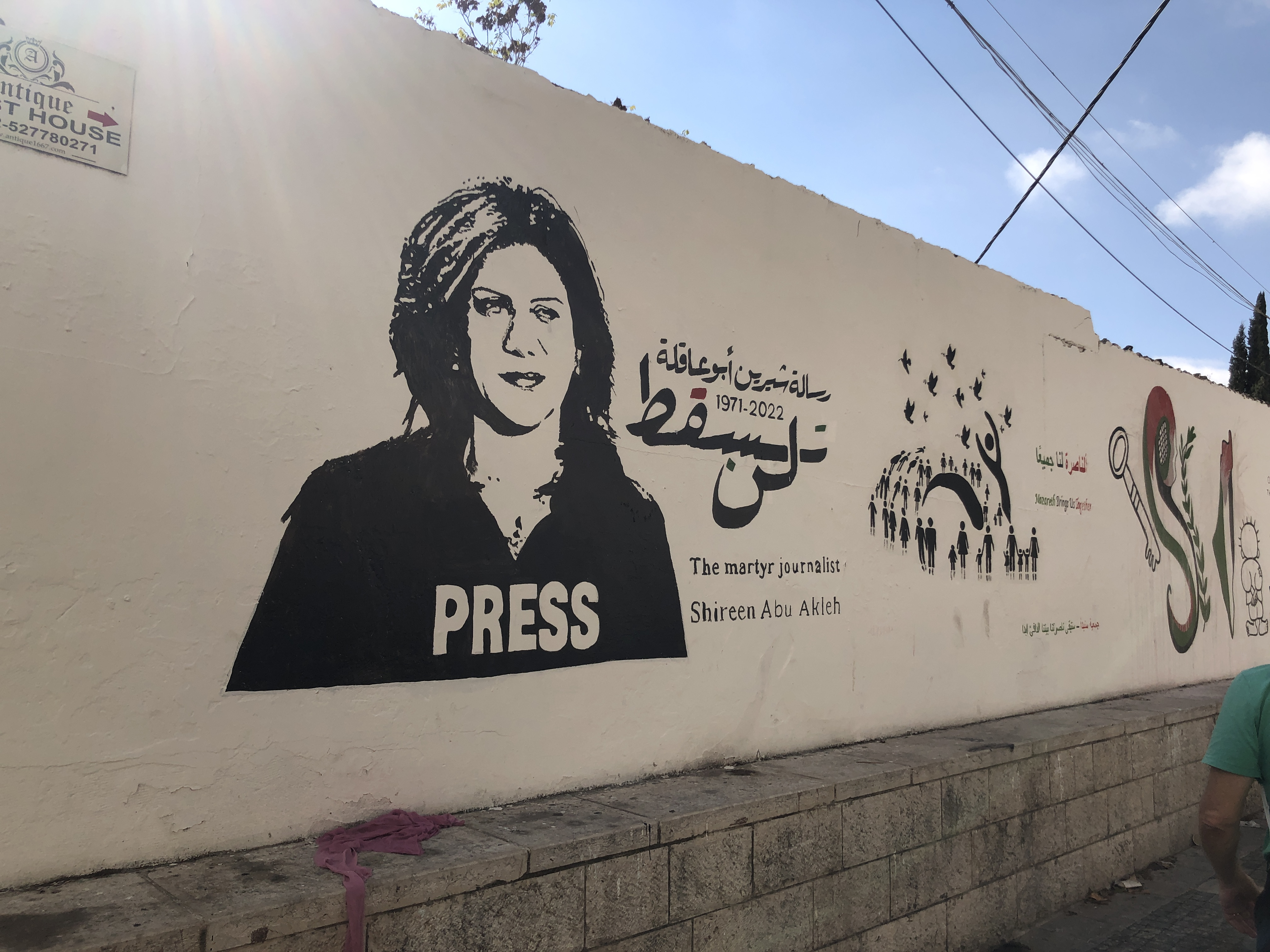
Graffiti of Shireen Abu Akleh in Nazareth.

== See also ==
- IDF admissions to misconduct after initial denials
- Killing of Muhammad al-Durrah
- Killing of Mohammad Habali
- Killing of Eyad al-Hallaq
- History of Palestinian journalism
