= Shireen Abu Akleh =

Palestinian-American journalist (1971–2022)

- شيرين أبو عاقلة
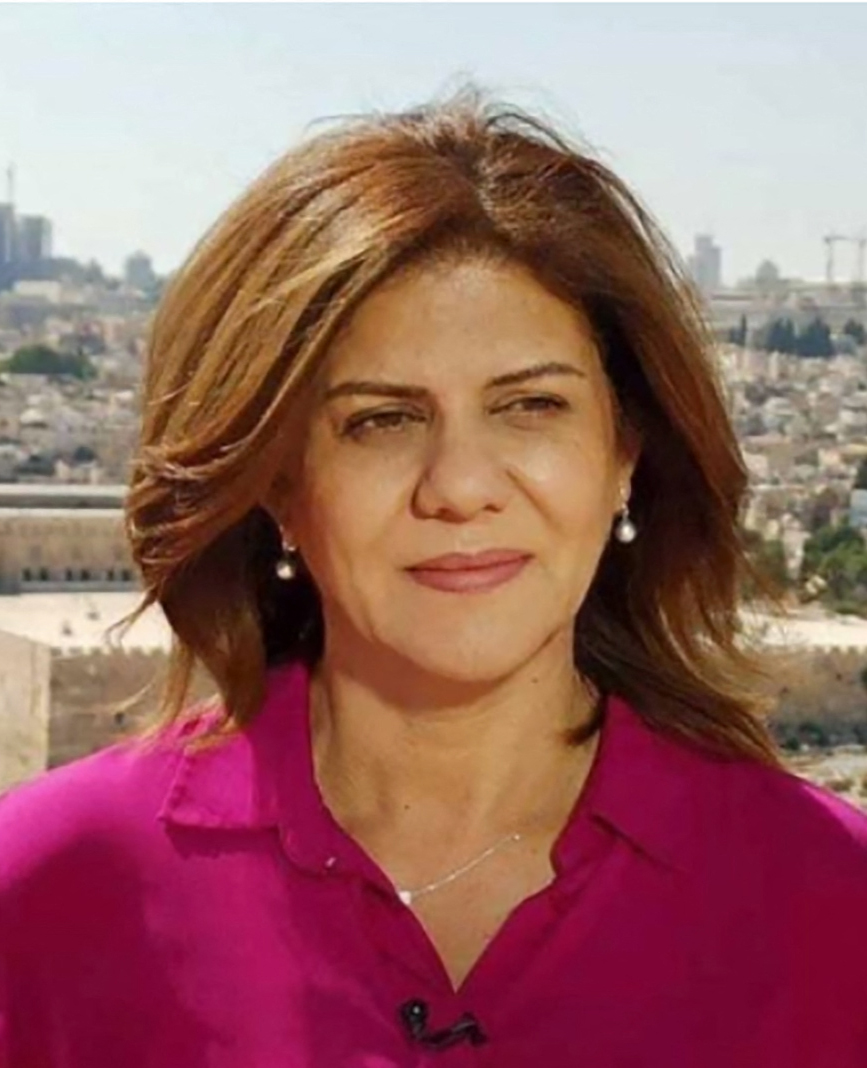
- Abu Akleh in 2022
- Born: April 3, 1971; East Jerusalem, Israeli-occupied West Bank
- Died: May 11, 2022 (aged 51); Jenin, Israeli-occupied West Bank
- Cause of death: Killed by gunshot
- Citizenship: Palestinian; American
- Education: Yarmouk University
- Occupation: Journalist
- Employer: Al Jazeera
- Known for: Coverage of the Israeli–Palestinian conflict
- Relatives: Lina Abu Akleh (niece)

Shireen Abu Akleh (Note: Because this name is a transliteration from Palestinian Arabic, there are various English spellings. The first name is also sometimes spelled Shereen or Sherine, while the last is sometimes presented as Abu Aqleh or Abu Aqla.) (Arabic: شيرين أبو عاقلة, romanized: Šīrīn Abū ʿĀqila; April 3, 1971 – May 11, 2022) was a prominent Palestinian-American journalist who worked as a reporter for 25 years for Al Jazeera, before she was killed by Israeli forces while wearing a blue press vest and covering a raid on the Jenin refugee camp in the Israeli-occupied West Bank. Abu Akleh was one of the most prominent names across the Middle East for her decades of reporting in the Palestinian territories, and seen as a role model for many Arab and Palestinian women. She is considered to be an icon of Palestinian journalism.

Upon her death on May 11, 2022, Israel denied responsibility and blamed Palestinian militants. However, it gradually changed its narrative until admitting she was likely "accidentally" killed by Israeli fire, but refused to undertake a criminal investigation. The admission came after several independent investigations were conducted by international media outlets, the United Nations High Commissioner for Human Rights, and the United States Department of State. Forensic Architecture refuted Israel's findings on September 20 and said Abu Akleh was deliberately targeted and denied medical aid after she was shot. In November 2022, the United States Department of Justice opened a separate investigation into the killing, in a move that Israel condemned and refused to cooperate with. Her niece Lina Abu Akleh has since been demanding that the Israeli forces responsible for her death be held accountable.

The manner of her death and the subsequent violent disruption of her funeral drew widespread international condemnation of Israel. During her funeral procession, the Israel Police attacked the pallbearers at the Saint Joseph's Hospital in East Jerusalem with batons and stun grenades. The hospital itself was also stormed by Israeli police officers, who assaulted patients and threw stun grenades, wounding and causing burns to medical staff in the building. The facility issued a statement from the Christian Churches of the Holy Land, stating that the Israel Police's actions constituted "invasion and disproportionate use of force" and a violation of the "right of freedom of religion" for the Palestinians. Abu Akleh's funeral was attended by tens of thousands of people carrying Palestinian flags and chanting nationalist songs; it is believed to have been the largest Palestinian funeral in Jerusalem in over twenty years. On October 26, 2023, the Israeli military bulldozed a memorial that had been erected at the site where Abu Akleh was killed.

== Early life and education ==
Abu Akleh was born in Jerusalem in 1971, to Louli and Nasri Abu Aqleh, a Palestinian Arab Christian (Melkite Catholic) family from Bethlehem. She spent time in the United States, obtaining U.S. citizenship through members of her mother's family who lived in New Jersey. Abu Akleh's parents died when she was young. She had one brother.

Abu Akleh attended secondary school at Rosary Sisters High School in Beit Hanina, then matriculated at the Jordan University of Science and Technology to study architecture, but decided not to pursue the profession; she instead transferred to Yarmouk University in Jordan, from which she graduated with a bachelor's degree in print journalism. After graduating, Abu Akleh returned to Palestine.

== Career ==
I chose journalism to be close to people. It might not be easy to change the reality, but at least I could bring their voice to the world.

— Abu Akleh, in an Al Jazeera television segment

Abu Akleh worked as a journalist for Radio Monte Carlo and Voice of Palestine. She additionally worked for the UNRWA (United Nations Relief and Works Agency for Palestine Refugees in the Near East), the Amman Satellite Channel, and for the MIFTAH (the Palestinian Initiative for the Promotion of Global Dialogue and Democracy). In 1997, she began working as a journalist for Al Jazeera, as one of their first field correspondents, becoming well known as a reporter on their Arabic-language channel. She lived and worked in East Jerusalem, reporting on major events related to Palestine including the Second Intifada, and additionally covering Israeli politics. She often reported on funerals for Palestinians killed by Israeli forces.

Having reported on events including the Battle of Jenin in 2002 and various Israeli operations in the Gaza Strip, and interviewed long-term Palestinian prisoners at Shikma Prison in 2005 as the first Arab journalist allowed inside, Abu Akleh expressed concern that she was being targeted by the Israel Defense Forces (IDF) and armed Israeli settlers. In one interview with Al Jazeera, she stated that she had repeatedly been accused by Israeli authorities of photographing security areas.

Abu Akleh continued in her role with Al Jazeera until she was killed in 2022. In July 2021, she was to be the first Al Jazeera journalist to broadcast live from Cairo when the network was allowed to return due to an improvement in Egypt–Qatar relations. At the time of her death, she had been studying Hebrew in order to better understand narratives in the Israeli media, and had recently gained a diploma in digital media.

Abu Akleh's career inspired many other Palestinians and Arabs to become journalists; her live television reporting and distinct signoffs were particularly well-known. After her death, The New York Times and NPR both described her as "a household name" among Palestinians. The Times of Israel characterized her as "a veteran journalist ... among Arab media's most prominent figures". The BBC described her as being widely known and admired by both viewers and colleagues.

On May 31, 2022, the UN announced the renaming of their annual training program to The Shireen Abu Akleh Training Program for Palestinian Broadcasters and Journalists.

== Death ==
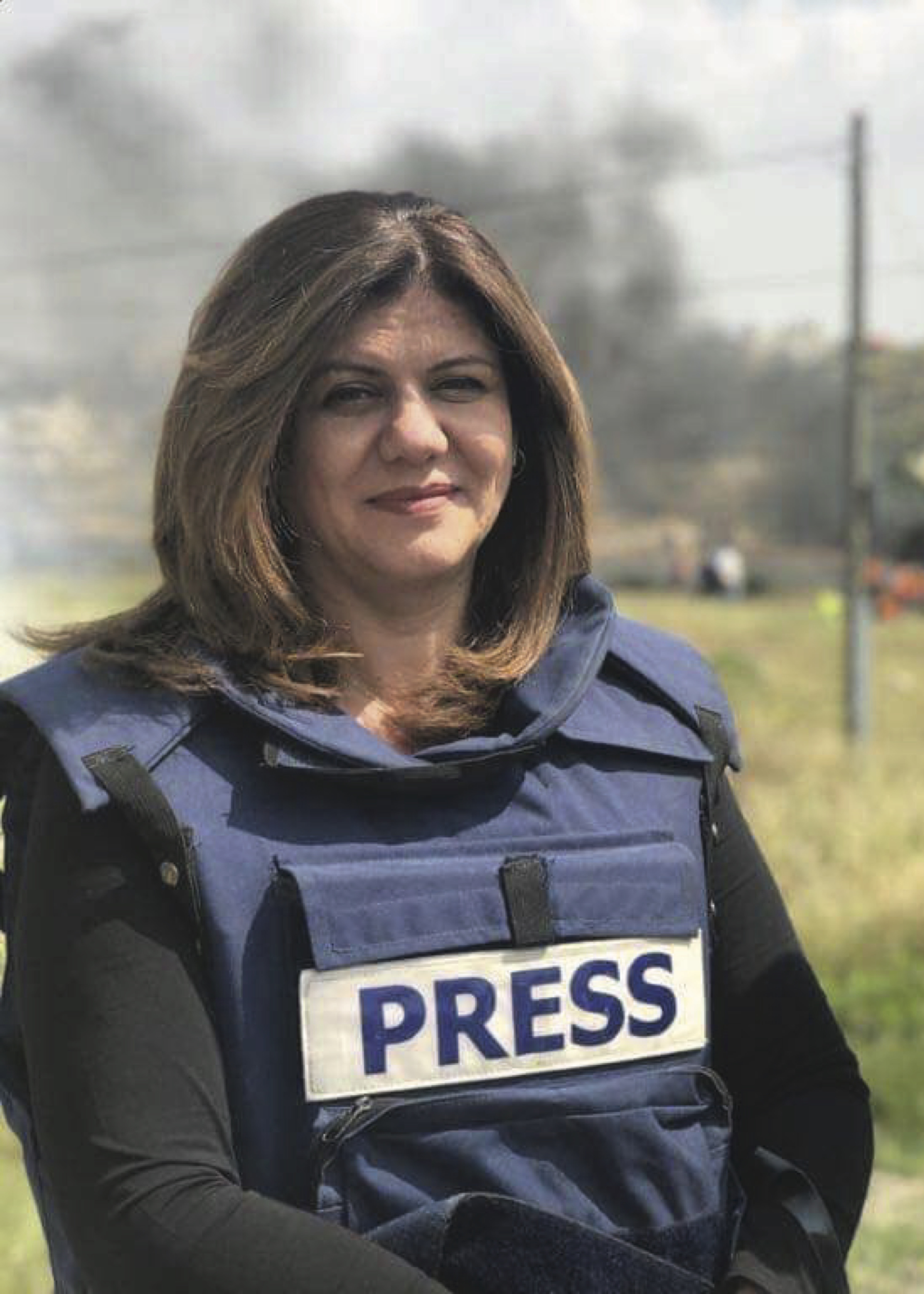
Abu Akleh wearing a jacket marked "PRESS" while reporting

Of course I get scared. In a specific moment you forget that fear. We don't throw ourselves to death. We go and we try to find where we can stand and how to protect the team with me before I think about how I am going to go up on the screen and what I am going to say.

— Abu Akleh, asked in 2017 by An-Najah NBC if she was afraid of being shot while reporting

On May 11, 2022, the Palestinian Health Ministry announced the death of Abu Akleh. She had been reporting on an IDF raid in Jenin Camp when, according to witnesses and Al-Jazeera, she was shot and killed by the IDF. Al Jazeera accused Israel of deliberately targeting the victim. Abu Akleh was present at a raid which the Israeli military stated was targeted at capturing "terror suspects". Al Jazeera said that Abu Akleh was shot in the head by the IDF, and transported to Ibn Sina Hospital, where she was pronounced dead. She was 51 years old. Another journalist, Ali Samodi of Al-Quds newspaper, was shot in the back but survived; two other Palestinians were transported to a hospital in moderate condition.

The Times of London reported that Abu Akleh was shot by a sniper. Shatha Hanaysha, a Palestinian journalist, said that she and a fourth journalist, along with Abu Akleh and Ali Samodi, had been pinned down by Israeli snipers, who did not cease firing even after Abu Akleh went down, preventing Hanaysha from pulling the victim in. An autopsy at An-Najah National University was unable to determine who shot Abu Akleh; the pathologist found no evidence that she had been shot at close range. The autopsy confirmed that Abu Akleh was killed by an armour-piercing bullet that struck her in the back of the head, and, exiting her forehead, ricocheted back from her helmet, causing skull fractures and damage to the brain. The bullet was recovered and sent for further examination.

=== Aftermath ===
Abu Akleh's home was raided by Israeli forces after she was killed; they confiscated Palestinian flags and prevented "the playing of nationalistic songs".

Thousands of people had gathered in Ramallah in honor of Abu Akleh, where her body was transported to the network's offices for colleagues, friends, and family to "bid her the final farewell". Alternative Syndicate of the Press journalists gathered to honor Abu Akleh in downtown Beirut. In her hometown of Beit Hanina, at least five Palestinians were injured in confrontations with armed Israeli soldiers, while at least three were detained; a crowd in front of her home protested her killing.

When Israeli forces raided and shut down the Ramallah office of Al Jazeera Abu Akleh had worked at on September 22, 2024, soldiers went out of their way to tear down a poster of Abu Akleh.

== Funeral ==
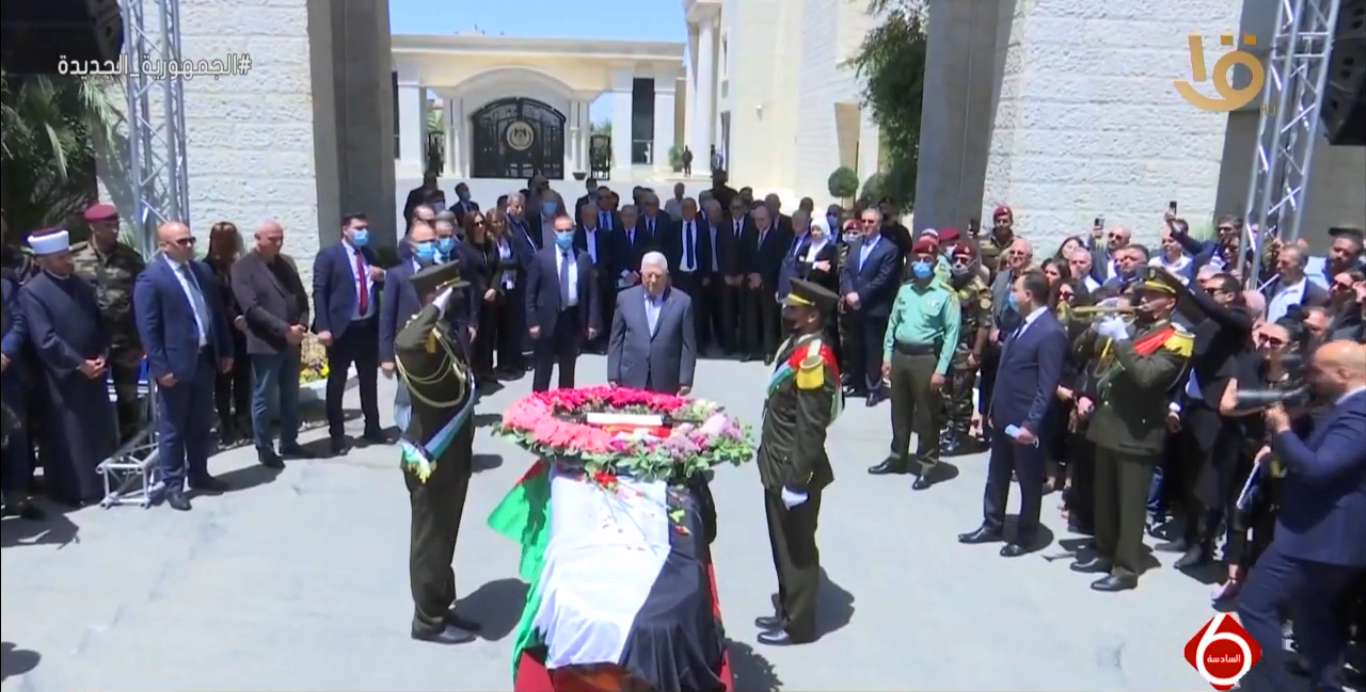
Official funeral of journalist Shireen Abu Akleh in Ramallah

The Palestinian Authority scheduled a state funeral procession to be held on May 12, 2022, in Ramallah, beginning at the Palestinian presidential headquarters. Mahmoud Abbas, President of the State of Palestine, planned to attend. Abu Akleh's brother, Tony, said that he had spoken to Israeli police before the funeral, and that the police wanted to know the procession route, any arrangements for the funeral, and did not want any Palestinian flags, slogans or chanting during the procession.

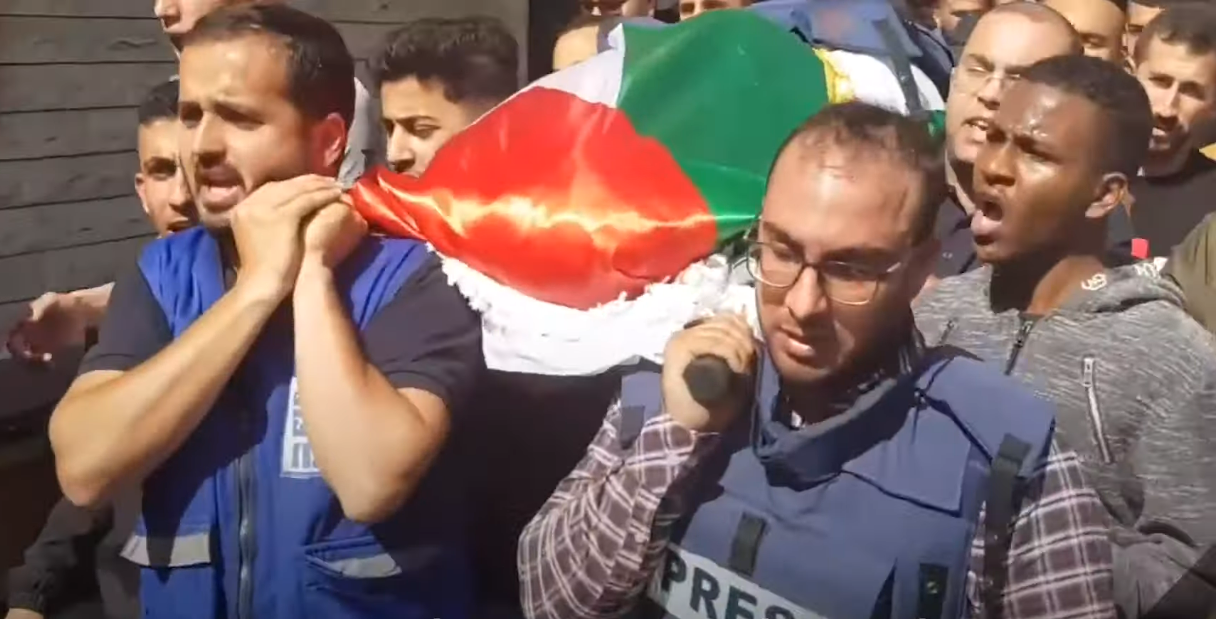
Mourners carry Abu Akleh's body, wrapped in a Palestinian flag and a blue press jacket

Abu Akleh's body was transported from Jenin through Nablus and Ramallah to her funeral in Jerusalem. Abu Akleh's funeral took place on May 13 in East Jerusalem. Thousands of mourners attended, many carrying Palestinian flags. The procession began at the Saint Joseph Hospital in East Jerusalem. As the funeral began, mourners insisted her body could be carried on their shoulders, a common occurrence in Palestinian funerals.

Israeli police burst through the gates and attacked mourners with batons and stun grenades, some repeatedly hitting and kicking pallbearers that were backed against a wall resulting in her coffin nearly falling to the ground. The Israeli police said they acted on the grounds of the crowd "disrupting public order", saying that "300 rioters" had tried to take over the casket, but this allegation was challenged by Abu Akleh's brother. Israeli police tried to prohibit the mourners from publicly displaying the Palestinian flag, but mourners waved the flag and chanted "Palestine! Palestine!" The police said (without providing evidence) that stones were thrown at its officers. A video showed a police officer telling the crowd that "If you don't stop these chants and nationalistic songs we will have to disperse you using force and we won't let the funeral take place."

A video released by East Jerusalem's Christian leaders during a May 16 press conference shows that violence by Israeli police had begun even before the procession commenced. In the footage, taken from security cameras installed at Saint Joseph's Hospital, dozens of Israeli police officers are seen storming the hospital building while Abu Akleh's casket had not yet left, as they hit, shove, and trample on patients; officers also threw stun grenades, wounding and causing burns to medical staff, and fired bullets of unknown nature on the outside part of the compound.

The coffin was later loaded on to a hearse and transported to the Cathedral of the Annunciation of the Virgin for the funeral, and from there carried on foot to a Greek Orthodox cemetery on Mount Zion where she was buried next to her parents.

The European Union released a statement saying it was "appalled by the violence in the St Joseph hospital compound and the level of unnecessary force exercised by Israeli police throughout the funeral procession." On May 16, the convent-run Saint Joseph Hospital cited a statement from an organization representing 15 Christian denominations, the Christian Churches of the Holy Land group, as saying "The police actions constituted an "invasion and disproportionate use of force ... (and) a severe violation of international norms and regulations, including the fundamental right of freedom of religion" The hospital's director Jamil Koussa said "it was now clear the target of police violence was the coffin itself", and that the Israeli police's intention was to terrorize the people in the building.

In an interview with CNN, Abu Akleh's brother described the police action as "intentional and brutal" and said they could have instead blocked the road to stop the procession. He also denied the Israeli police's version that the police had an agreement with Abu Akleh's family. Abu Akleh's niece related she was threatened with a beating by an Israeli officer during the police rampage.

Israel said it would carry out "a comprehensive investigation of what happened during the funeral, in order to learn lessons from the event". Findings would be presented in due course. A few days after the funeral, one of the Palestinian pallbearers beaten by Israeli police was arrested and placed under solitary confinement; the police said the arrest was unrelated to the funeral, but has refused to provide a justification for the action. According to the pallbearer's lawyer, however, the interrogations were indeed about Abu Akleh's funeral.

The Israeli Health Ministry said they would review the violence at the funeral. As of May 24, St. Joseph's director Jamil Koussa said no one from the ministry or the police had contacted him. On June 16, the Israel Police announced that an internal investigation into the conduct of police at Abu Akleh's funeral had been completed and the results had been delivered to Police Commissioner Kobi Shabtai and Public Security Minister Omer Bar-Lev.

Although the conclusions were not released to the public, Shabtai released a corresponding statement that "the funeral procession of journalist Shireen Abu Akleh was a complex event. It is impossible to remain indifferent to the difficult scenes", claiming that the incident needed to be properly reviewed "so that sensitive events such as these are not violently disturbed by rioters" and that "under my guidance, the police reviewed the conduct of the forces on the ground, with the aim of drawing lessons and improving operational conduct in similar future incidents." Haaretz and the Jerusalem Post both said that the investigation found that police misconduct had taken place, but it was decided in advance of the investigation that there would be no disciplinary action.

== Reaction ==
Abu Akleh's death drew widespread outrage. Al Jazeera described the killing of Abu Akleh as a "horrifying crime that breaches international norms" and was committed "in cold blood". The network's managing director Giles Trendle stated that the network was "shocked and saddened" by her death and called for a transparent investigation.

President Abbas stated that he considered Israeli forces "fully responsible" for Abu Akleh's death. Hussein al-Sheikh, the Palestinian Civil Affairs Minister and since May 26, 2022, secretary-general of the Palestine Liberation Organization's executive committee, replacing Saeb Erekat, wrote on Twitter that Abu Akleh had been "martyred by the bullets of the Israeli occupation", adding that the "crime of silencing the word" had been "committed once again, and the truth is murdered by the bullets of the Israeli occupation". Head of the Palestinian Mission to the United Kingdom Husam Zomlot described Abu Akleh as a "beloved journalist" and his close friend.

The United States Ambassador to Israel, Thomas R. Nides, said "I encourage a thorough investigation into the circumstances of her death and the injury of at least one other journalist today in Jenin." US State Department spokesman Ned Price and US Ambassador to the UN Linda Thomas-Greenfield both strongly condemned the killing. The former called it an "affront to media freedom everywhere" and said the perpetrators "must be held accountable", while the latter called for a "thorough investigation".

On May 11, the UN Special Rapporteur on Palestine, Francesca Albanese, said that the crime constitutes a "serious violation of international humanitarian law and is potentially a war crime under the Rome Statute of the International Criminal Court." On May 13, United Nations human rights experts, Albanese and three other UN rapporteurs, reiterated the point, followed later by a rare unanimous United Nations Security Council resolution condemning the killing and demanding "an immediate, thorough, transparent and impartial investigation into her killing".

On the anniversary of Abu Akleh's death, the Committee to Protect Journalists asserted there was a 'deadly pattern' in the way Israel had killed 20 journalists since 2001 without holding anyone accountable. According to Reporters Without Borders (Reporters sans frontières, RSF), 144 Palestinian journalists have been wounded by Israeli forces across the Gaza Strip, West Bank, and East Jerusalem since 2018. In April 2022, the International Federation of Journalists filed a complaint with the International Criminal Court, accusing Israeli forces of systematic targeting of journalists. The complaint details four cases: Ahmed Abu Hussein, Yaser Murtaja, Muath Amarneh, and Nedal Eshtayeh, who are alleged to have been targeted.

The director of RSF, Christophe Deloire, described Abu Akleh's killing as a violation of the Geneva Conventions and United Nations Security Council resolution 2222 on the protection of journalists. He stated that RSF was "disappointed" with a proposal by Yair Lapid that Israel should participate in a joint investigation into her death, saying that "an independent international investigation must be launched" instead. The Committee to Protect Journalists called for a "swift, immediate, and transparent investigation" into the killing, while the International Federation of Journalists condemned the killing "by Israeli troops" and called for an "immediate investigation". Amnesty International described it as a "bloody reminder of the deadly system in which Israel locks Palestinians" and called for an end to "unlawful killings" of Palestinians by Israeli forces. The Palestine Journalists Syndicate described the killing as "a clear assassination perpetrated by the Israeli occupation army".

Mohammed bin Abdulrahman bin Jassim Al Thani, deputy prime minister of Qatar, condemned what he called the "horrific crimes by the occupation against unarmed Palestinian people." Deputy foreign minister Lolwah Al-Khater tweeted "state sponsored Israeli terrorism must stop" and "unconditional support to Israel must end." The foreign ministry of Kuwait issued a statement condemning what they described as the killing of Abu Akleh by Israeli forces; similar statements were made by the foreign ministries of Egypt, Afghanistan, Pakistan, Djibouti, China, Iran, and South Africa.

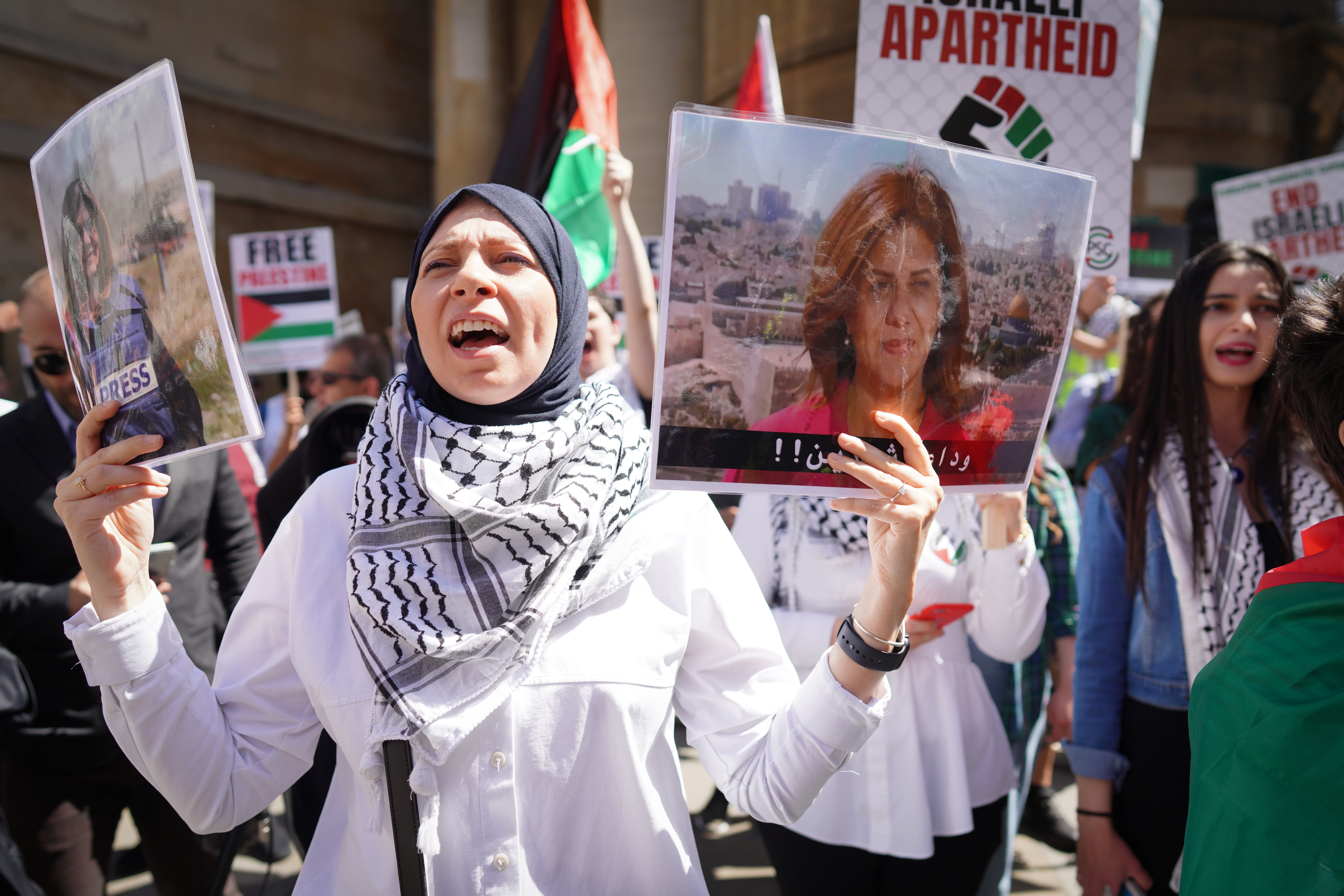
A demonstrator in London holding pictures of Abu Akleh on May 14

Abu Akleh's death was protested across numerous cities internationally during Nakba Day commemorations, including London, New York City, and Washington, D.C., among others. It was additionally condemned by Artists for Palestine UK in an open letter released on May 19, 2022, which was signed by over 100 artists including Pedro Almodóvar, Angela Davis, Susan Sarandon, Arundhati Roy, and Mark Ruffalo. The letter, which described Israel as an apartheid state, decried "Israeli occupation forces' killing of the highly respected Palestinian journalist Shireen Abu Akleh" along with the subsequent "attack by heavily armed Israeli forces on Palestinian mourners".

An Arria formula meeting of the UNSC was held on May 24 to address the protection of journalists. Abu Akleh's killing was raised by many speakers, Abderrahim Foukara, Al Jazeera Network Bureau Chief for the Americas, told the meeting that Abu Akleh was "killed by an Israeli bullet in cold blood," and said "The network has the evidence and the witnesses to support that position,"

A letter from 24 Senate Democrats pressed the Biden administration to probe the killing. The American Israel Public Affairs Committee (AIPAC) lobbied against the letter. Previously, Senators Jon Ossoff and Mitt Romney issued a bipartisan demand for a full and transparent investigation. It followed an earlier letter in May signed by 57 House Democrats demanding an independent investigation into the killing.

Abu Akleh's family met with American Secretary of State Antony Blinken in Washington on July 26. Following the meeting, Lina Abu Akleh, her niece, tweeted that the family pressed for a "US investigation that leads to real accountability" continuing "although he made some commitments on Shireen's killing, we're still waiting to see if this administration will meaningfully answer our calls for #JusticeForShireen,"

The United States has since August been pressing Israel to review IDF rules of engagement. On September 6, State Department deputy spokesperson Vedant Patel said "We will continue to press Israel directly and closely at the senior-most levels to review its policies and practices on this to ensure that something like this doesn't happen again in the future." However, on September 7, Israel's Alternate Prime Minister, Naftali Bennett, said that the rules of engagement "will be determined by IDF commanders, independent of any pressure – internal or external".

== Investigations ==
=== Initial Israel investigations ===
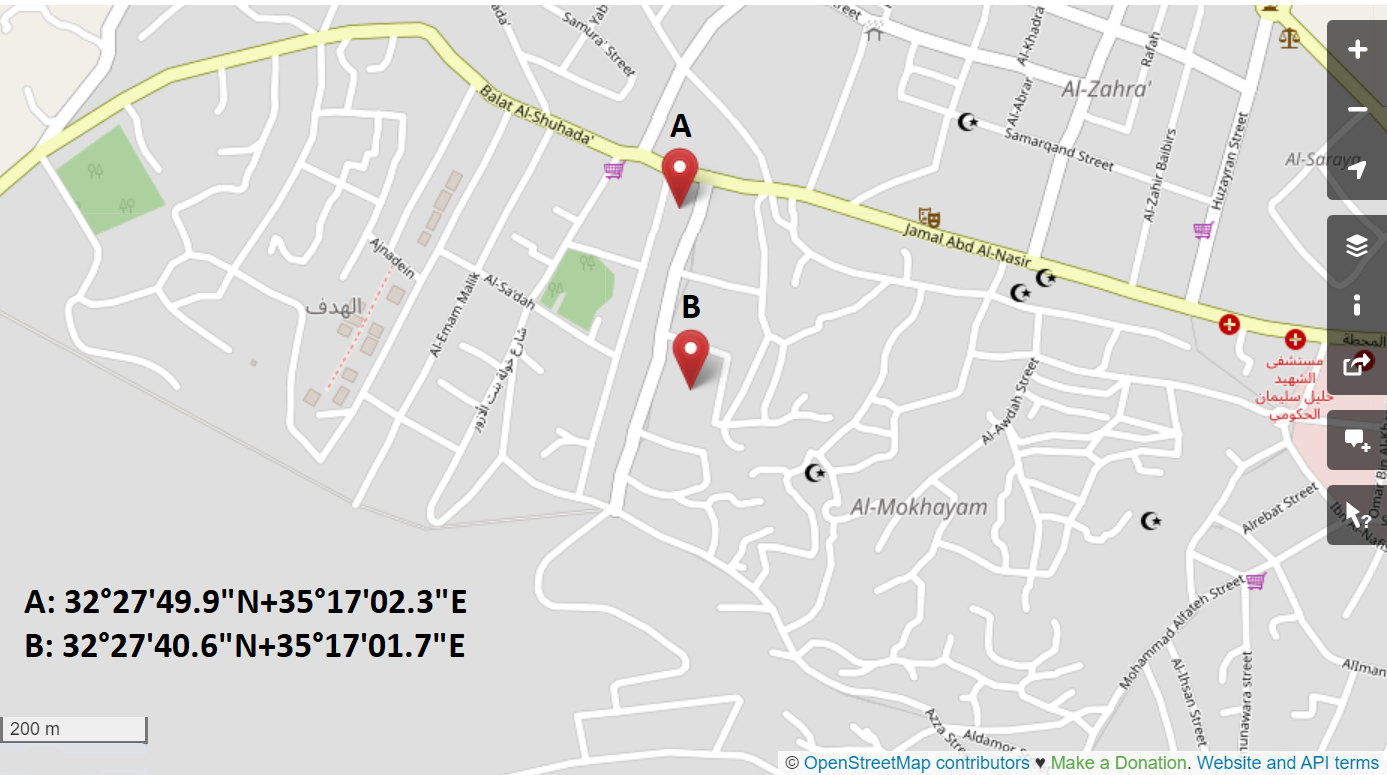
A map by B'tselem showing where it says the Israel Defense Forces were exchanging gunfire with militants (B) versus where Akleh was killed (A).

Israeli Prime Minister Naftali Bennett initially posted a tweet blaming the death on Palestinian gunmen, citing a video posted by the Israeli military. Human rights organization B'Tselem documented the exact location from which Palestinian militants depicted in that video had fired and the exact location in which Abu Akleh had been killed, observing that the two locations were hundreds of meters apart and separated by multiple walls and buildings. The Washington Post verified the distance between the two locations. The investigation by B'Tselem, released hours after the Israeli official postings, likewise found that the alley depicted in the footage was nowhere near the site where Abu Akleh was gunned down and that it was "impossible" for the fighters to hit Abu Akleh or anyone in her vicinity.

Later in the day, the Israeli military chief, Lt Gen Aviv Kochavi, said: "At this stage we cannot determine by whose fire she was harmed and we regret her death." Robert Mackey from The Intercept said that the Israeli army later released body camera footage to show that Palestinian militants fired on its forces; a comparison with video recorded by the B'Tselem researcher later in the day confirmed that "Israeli soldiers were at the end of the alley the Palestinian militant had been filmed firing down" and when the "Israeli soldiers retreated from that alley, they emerged onto the very same street that Abu Akleh was standing on when she was shot." In the evening, Minister of Defense Benny Gantz said, "We are trying to figure out exactly what happened," and "I don't have final conclusions", and promised a transparent investigation.

According to the Israeli military, Palestinian militants had fired on IDF soldiers, after which the soldiers returned fire. The IDF released a video showing Palestinian gunmen firing in the Jenin camp, purportedly in the area where Abu Akleh was killed. In the video, a militant was heard saying, "They [Palestinian militants]'ve hit one, they've hit a soldier, he's laying on the ground." As no Israeli soldiers were injured during the operation, Israeli authorities said it was likely the Palestinians had shot Akleh by mistake, thinking she was a soldier. A Haaretz report found the possibility unlikely as several buildings blocked a direct line of sight between that militant and the reporter.

According to Amos Harel, Israeli communications on the incident were overly hasty, and risked feeding suspicions of a cover-up. Communications Minister Yoaz Hendel told Israel Hayom he assumed Palestinian gunfire was to blame for her death. According to Haaretz, military spokesman Ran Kochav told Kan Bet public radio: "We offered the Palestinians to investigate immediately, a joint investigation, to find out of who shot the Palestinian" but no such offer had been made and several hours passed before Foreign Minister Yair Lapid discussed the situation with senior PA (Palestine Authority) official Hussein al-Sheikh, who denied that any offer was made. An interim IDF probe narrowed down the circumstances of her death to two scenarios: either a case of indiscriminate Palestinian gunfire and one of possibly errant Israeli sniper fire.

Multiple eyewitnesses, including two journalists standing next to Abu Akleh, reported that the area had been relatively quiet immediately prior to her death and no Palestinians, civilian or otherwise, were present, disputing Israeli statements of her having died in a crossfire. Al Jazeera reported that according to their Ramallah bureau chief, Walid Al-Omari, there was no shooting by Palestinian gunmen; Mustafa Barghouti of the Palestinian National Initiative also stated that there was "no exchange of fire" at the scene. Al-Omari also stated that Abu Akleh had been wearing a helmet and was shot in an unprotected area under her ear, suggesting that this demonstrated she was "deliberately targeted". Video of the shooting showed Abu Akleh wearing a blue flak jacket that was clearly marked "PRESS". In footage released days later, portraying the last few minutes before the shooting barrage against the Al Jazeera team, no battle was seen or heard taking place. An Agence France-Presse photojournalist reported that Israeli forces had shot and killed Abu Akleh.

=== Subsequent investigations ===
The United States demanded a transparent investigation, while the European Union demanded an independent probe, and was supported by Michelle Bachelet, the United Nations High Commissioner for Human Rights.

Several independent groups, including news outlets, launched their own investigations. Bellingcat carried out a video and audio analysis of social media from Palestinian and Israeli military sources concluding that while gunmen and Israeli soldiers were both present, gunmen were much further away, and the evidence supported witness accounts that Israeli fire was likely responsible. The shooting, says Bellingcat, was "slow and deliberate, suggesting targeting rather than a spray of bullets aimed at another object or person".

On June 16, 2022, Al Jazeera reported that it had obtained an image of the bullet and that according to ballistic and forensic experts, the green-tipped bullet was designed to pierce armour and 5.56mm calibre for use in an M4 rifle, the same as regularly used by Israeli forces. Palestinian fighters also use the M4. Israeli human rights group B'tselem also conducted an investigation, having "played a key role in the military's backtracking from its initial claims that Palestinian gunmen appeared to be responsible" for the death."

The Associated Press has also carried out a reconstruction of events saying it "lends support to assertions from both Palestinian authorities and Abu Akleh's colleagues that the bullet that cut her down came from an Israeli gun", and that "any conclusive answer is likely to prove elusive because of the severe distrust between the two sides, each of which is in sole possession of potentially crucial evidence." A CNN investigation, which reviewed 11 videos and interviewed eyewitnesses and a firearms expert, said the new evidence suggests "that Abu Akleh was shot dead in a targeted attack by Israeli forces".

On May 26, the Jerusalem Post reported that Palestine had completed its investigation, forwarded the findings to the US administration, concluding that the IDF "directly and deliberately" targeted Abu Akleh. Israel denied the accusation.

The Palestinian Authority refused an Israeli request to conduct a joint investigation, insisting on the results of its own investigation which found that the IDF had deliberately killed Abu Akleh. The Palestinian Authority also refused requests to hand the bullet over to Israel for ballistic testing. The Israeli government identified the gun of a soldier which may have killed her but insisted that it could not determine which side had fired the fatal shot without the bullet. A bipartisan group of United States Congress members urged the Biden administration to press the Palestinian Authority to release the bullet for tests. Israeli Minister of Defense Benny Gantz said the IDF had requested that Palestinians let Israelis examine the bullet. Israel also suggested a joint probe into the death, which was rejected by the Palestinian Authority on the grounds that it wanted an independent investigation.

The IDF announced that it had begun investigating the possibility that one of its soldiers had shot and killed Abu Akleh, beginning inquiries into three shooting incidents that involved its soldiers, with one of them occurring within 150 metres (500 ft) of where Abu Akleh was located. An IDF official said that this was "the more probable to be involved in the death" of the three being investigated. An unidentified military spokesperson told reporters that a rifle has been identified which might be that used but without the bullet it cannot be confirmed. Israeli officials also confirmed that "soldiers in a military vehicle had been about 150 yards [140 m] from where the journalists were working, and fired repeatedly about the time Abu Akleh was killed."

The IDF later announced that while an operational inquiry into the killing would still go on, they would not conduct an enquiry in the fashion of criminal investigation, saying there was no suspicion on their part that a criminal act had been committed. The Israeli government issued a statement that no criminal investigation was required. Yesh Din accused the Israeli government of shirking its responsibilities by avoiding a criminal investigation; Al Jazeera reporter Imran Khan stated that "a criminal investigation into a serving Israeli army officer or soldier on an active military operation" would be "absolutely untenable" in the current Israeli political climate, since the public generally views the IDF "as being untouchable, as being defenders of Israel".

Following the Israeli refusal, Congressman André Carson said that, as of May 19, a letter to Blinken requesting that the FBI investigate had collected 55 congressional signatures. Separate from the announcement that the Military Police would not be opening an investigation into the killing, due to the lack of suspicion of criminality, the IDF nevertheless announced on May 19 that it had identified the gun that 'may have killed Abu Akleh'. However, it said the conclusion would remain uncertain without a bullet analysis. The Palestinian attorney-general, Akram Al-Khatib, said on July 2 that the bullet has been handed over to a recently arrived "specialized US team of experts" for technical examination. According to Al-Khatib, the test would take place at the US embassy in Jerusalem and "we got guarantees from the American coordinator that the examination will be conducted by them and that the Israeli side will not take part", but according to Kochav, "The testing will be carried out by Israeli investigators in the presence of US observers".

The US State Department subsequently announced on July 4 that tests by independent ballistics experts under U.S. oversight were not conclusive about the gun it was fired from, but that US officials have concluded that gunfire from Israeli positions most likely killed Akleh and that there was "no reason to believe" her shooting was intentional. US investigators had "full access" to both IDF and PA investigations. The Palestinian Public Prosecutor's Office disputes the US conclusion that the bullet cannot be matched to a gun and maintains its position that the killing was premeditated. On July 5, the US stressed that it did not conduct its own probe, but the conclusion was a "summation" of investigations by the Palestinian Authority and Israel.

On June 12, the Washington Post published the results of its own investigation suggesting that an Israeli soldier in an identified convoy "likely shot and killed Abu Akleh". Although the IDF said in a statement "multiple barrages" were fired by a gunman at the convoy prior to an IDF soldier returning fire, the analysis found no evidence of a firefight prior to the killing. The IDF refused to say whether the convoy was the same one under investigation. On June 20, the New York Times published what it described as a "month long investigation" concluding that "the bullet that killed Ms. Abu Akleh was fired from the approximate location of the Israeli military convoy, most likely by a soldier from an elite unit." The Times further found that there had been no Palestinian militants in the area that Abu Akleh was working when she was shot, refuting claims by the Israeli military that had an IDF soldier shot her it had been due to engaging with Palestinian gunmen in the area at the time.

On June 24, the Office of the United Nations High Commissioner for Human Rights said it had concluded Abu Akleh was killed by a bullet fired by the IDF, based on information provided by the IDF and the Palestinian attorney general as well as inspection of photo, video and audio material, visiting the scene, consulting experts, reviewing official communications and interviewing of witnesses. The spokesperson said, "It is deeply disturbing that Israeli authorities have not conducted a criminal investigation".

The Israeli human rights organization Yesh Din analyzed Israeli military records on prosecutions resulting from military investigations and found that Israeli forces have "near-total impunity from prosecution in cases in which Palestinians were harmed by IDF soldiers", and further that the army's investigative mechanisms are not adequate as the data shows that "even when the army does investigate, it does not lead to justice," with just 5 criminal prosecutions, 2% of all complaints received, in 2019–2020.

On September 5, the IDF released the results of its own investigation, finding that there was a "high possibility" that Abu Akleh was "accidentally hit" by army fire, but that it would not begin a criminal investigation. The report claimed that the army had come under fire from Palestinians in the area, saying the army could not definitively rule out the possibility that Palestinian gunmen killed Abu Akleh, and that there was no suspicion of a criminal act in her death. A video of the incident did not corroborate the claim that Palestinian fighters were firing from the scene. The Associated Press reported that in a briefing with reporters, "a senior military official" said that an Israeli soldier had, "with very high likelihood", misidentified Abu Akleh and shot her by mistake. He did not explain why eyewitnesses and video footage contradicted the Israeli claims of Palestinian gunfire in the area.

Abu Akleh's family continued to call for an independent investigation by the United States and an International Criminal Court inquiry, saying that the IDF report "tried to obscure the truth and avoid responsibility" and that "Our family is not surprised by this outcome since it's obvious to anyone that Israeli war criminals cannot investigate their own crimes." Democratic senator for Maryland Chris Van Hollen also dismissed the Israeli report, saying its findings were inconsistent with the evidence and repeating his call for an independent US investigation into Abu Aqleh's killing. The Foreign Press Association, representing international media covering Israel and the Palestinian territories, said the IDF conclusions "raise major questions about the military's actions that day and serious doubts about its stated commitment to protecting journalists in the future," while the committee to Protect Journalists, which advocates for press freedom worldwide, said the report "does not provide the answers — by any measure of transparency or accountability — that her family and colleagues deserve." Israeli Prime Minister Yair Lapid pushed back against calls for a criminal prosecution, stating that the soldier "was protecting himself from terrorist fire". He added that "no one will dictate our rules of engagement" and that "our soldiers have the full backing of the government [...] and the people."

On September 20, a joint investigation released by Al-Haq and Forensic Architecture, an international research group, concluded that Abu Akleh and her colleagues were subject of "Israel's deliberate targeting".

=== US investigation ===
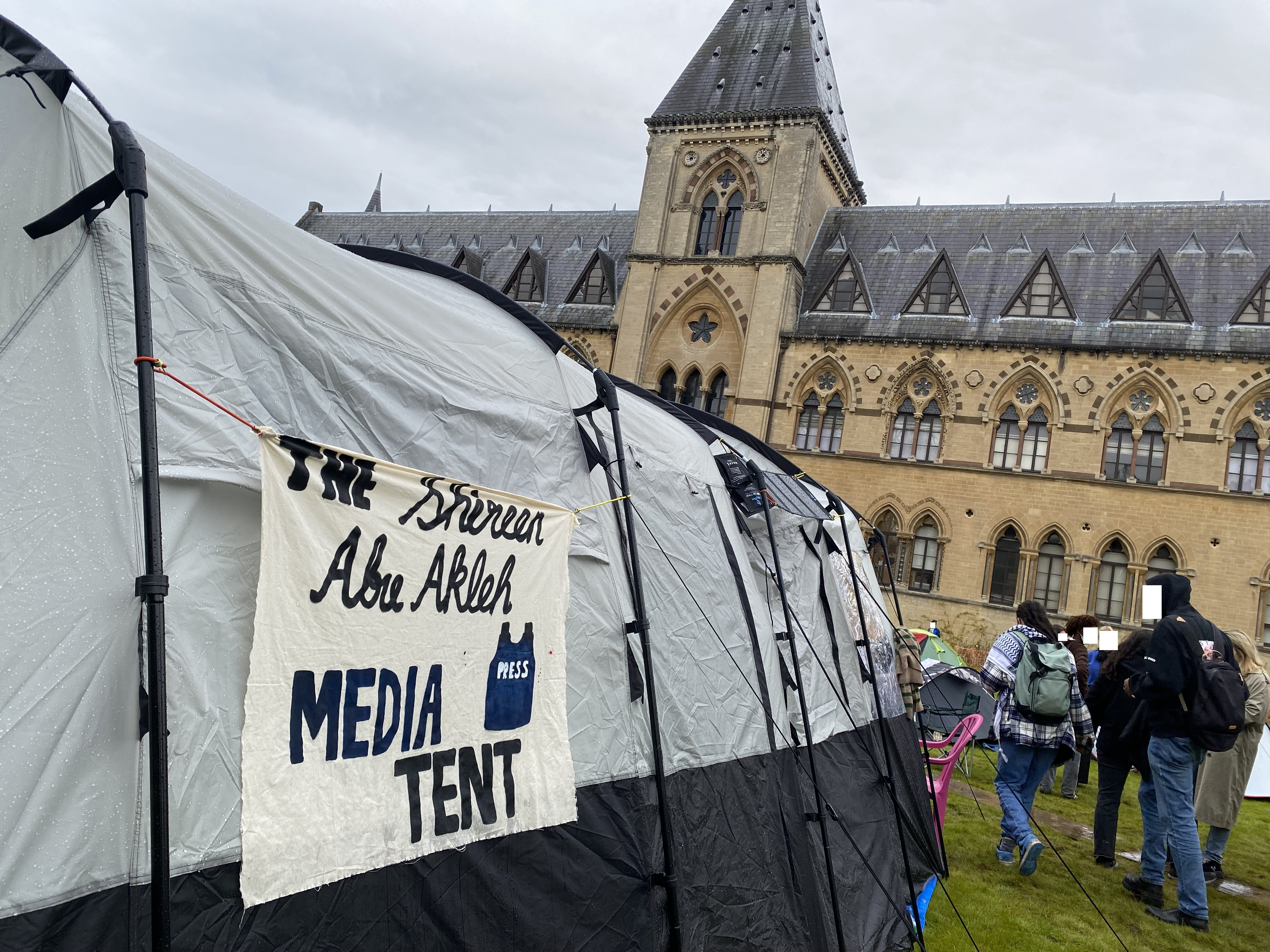
Memorial tent named after Akleh seen during the 2024 University of Oxford pro-Palestinian campus occupations

The U.S. Department of Justice opened an investigation into the killing, the Israeli Defense Ministry announced on November 15, 2022. Defense Minister Benny Gantz called the investigation "a grave mistake." He said that "the IDF conducted an independent and professional investigation, the details of which were presented to the Americans" and "I made it clear to the American representatives that we stand behind the IDF soldiers, that we will not cooperate with any external investigation, and we will not allow interference in Israel's internal affairs". Three Israeli and U.S. officials told Axios that the White House and the State Department told the Israeli government they were not behind the FBI decision to open an investigation. On November 14, 2022, 19 House Democrats introduced standalone legislation, the Justice for Shireen Act, requiring a report on the killing. On November 15, 2022, Amnesty International said in a statement reacting to the announcement of an investigation that "Israel cannot keep killing Palestinians with impunity."

The official report from the US State Department concluded that shots fired from Israeli military positions were "likely responsible," for Abu Akleh's death, but they "found no reason to believe that this was intentional." It concluded that the shooting "the result of tragic circumstances." Colonel Gabavics was the lead U.S. investigator on the case, and visited the scene of the shooting hours after it occurred. He concluded that the shooting was deliberate. The US investigating team also concluded that the Israeli soldier who shot Ms. Abu Akleh must have known that he was shooting at a journalist. After Colonel Gabavics retired from the military he went public with his allegations that the U.S. government had soft-pedaled his team's findings to appease the Israeli government. His boss, Lt. Gen. Michael R. Fenzel, stands by the conclusions of the original report.

=== Referral of case to the International Criminal Court ===
On May 23, 2022, the Palestinian Foreign Minister Riyad al-Maliki announced that Abu Akleh's case, along evidence of other Israeli violations, had been submitted to the prosecutor of the International Criminal Court.

On May 26, 2022, the same day as Palestine said it had completed its investigation and forwarded the findings to the US administration, Al Jazeera said that it would file a case with the ICC to cover the killing and "the Israeli bombing and total destruction of Al Jazeera's office in Gaza in May 2021, as well as the continuous incitements and attacks on its journalists operating in the occupied Palestinian territories." The family of Abu Akleh said it had given permission for the case of her killing to be submitted to the International Criminal Court (ICC).

On September 20, 2022, the same day as the conclusion of the joint investigation by Al-Haq and Forensic Architecture, lawyers and advocacy groups referred the shooting to the International Criminal Court on behalf of her family. On December 6, 2022, Al Jazeera submitted new evidence and announced its own filing of a separate formal ICC complaint against Israeli forces over the killing.

Ned Price, Spokesperson for the United States Department of State, said that the US has been protesting the International Criminal Court investigation in Palestine for a long time. He said that the ICC should focus on the punishment and prevention of atrocity crimes. Yair Lapid, former Prime Minister of Israel, said, "No one is going to investigate Israeli military soldiers and no one is going to sermonize to us about the ethics of war, definitely not Al Jazeera."

=== Zeteo documentary ===
External videos
- https://zeteo.com/p/who-killed-shireen-abu-akleh

An investigative documentary Who Killed Shireen? published by Zeteo in May 2025 identified Shireen's killer as Israeli soldier Alon Scagio of the Duvdevan Unit. The investigation revealed that Israel was immediately aware that one of its soldiers had shot Shireen despite their public attempts to blame Palestinians. The film also claims that the US investigation determined that Shireen was shot intentionally but that the Biden administration overruled that finding. According to Israeli soldiers interviewed in the investigation, Scagio's colleagues subsequently used Shireen's picture for target practice. Scagio was killed in combat by a roadside bomb in Jenin on June 27, 2024, at the age of 22.

== In popular culture ==
=== Remembrance and legacy ===
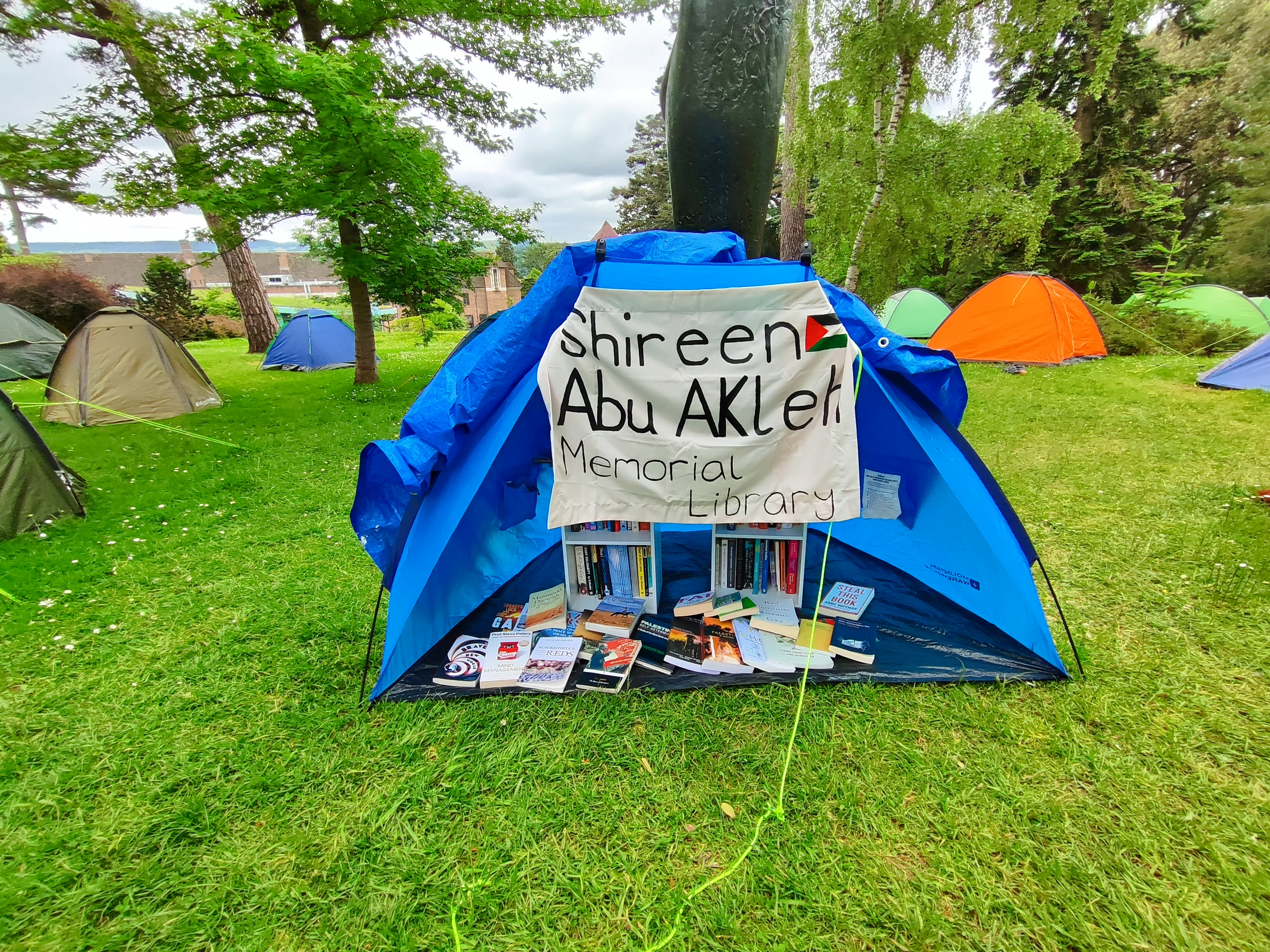
A tribute to Shireen Abu Akleh during a 2024 encampment at University of Exeter

Abu Akleh was one of the most prominent names across the Middle East for her decades of reporting in the Palestinian territories, and seen as a role model for many Arab and Palestinian women.

On May 11, 2023, friends and family of Abu Akleh renewed calls for justice and accountability over her death. Timed to coincide with the one year anniversary of her death, the Committee to Protect Journalists (CPJ) released a report with the findings that Israel has allowed the killings of at least 20 journalists, 18 of them Palestinian, by military personnel to go unaccounted for since 2001.

Friend and former colleague Dalia Hatuqa noted: "Years of seeing justice not being served for Palestinians tells me we shouldn't expect much. But if we focus on whatever silver lining there is, I'd never seen anything like the turnout at her funeral ... It showed how loved and respected she was. Shireen has inspired a whole generation of young women and men who admire her and her work and want to follow in her footsteps."

Earlier in the week, a memorial concert was held in Ramallah, attended by hundreds of people, to celebrate Abu Akleh's trailblazing life and career in the media and her legacy. Several of the pieces of music played were composed in her memory and performed by young women from the Edward Said National Conservatory of Music and a girls' choir from Jerusalem.

Several universities have already announced awards and scholarships in Abu Akleh's name, while a street in Ramallah has been named after her and an upcoming media museum, due to open in 2025, is also set to bear her name.

On October 26, 2023, a memorial erected at the site of her killing in Jenin was bulldozed and desecrated by Israel Defense Forces.

== Honors and awards ==
- 2003: Order of Courage - Libya
- 2022: Order of Jerusalem - Palestine
- 2022: Order of Independence - Jordan
- 2022: Red Company Press Freedom Award - Libya
- 2023: Courage in Journalism Award

== See also ==
- List of journalists killed during the Israeli–Palestinian conflict
- IDF admissions to misconduct after initial denials
- Iain Hook – British UNRWA employee killed in 2002 by IDF sniper in Jenin
- James Miller – Welsh documentarian killed in 2003 by IDF gunfire
- Fadel Shana'a – Palestinian cameraman working for Reuters who was killed in 2008 by Israeli fire in the Al Bureij massacre
- Timeline of the Israeli–Palestinian conflict in 2022
- Lina Abu Akleh – niece and award-winning justice advocate
