= Acar (surname) =

Acar or Açar is a surname of multiple origins. (see "Ç" and "C" for the pronunciation in various languages).

Its Turkish origins come from a Turkish given name. The given name Acar may be derived either from the meaning "strong, brave", etc., traced from 12th century, or from a Turkish settlement named Acar. It was a commonly chosen surname by the Turkish political elites after the introduction of Turkey's Surname Law.

It is also a French name found in Belgium, derived, along with the older names Acardus, Achardus, from a Germanic personal name Agihard, an Old High German variant of Eckehard/Ekkehard, etc., derived from the roots ekka/egga, 'sword', and harta/hard, 'hard'.

The surname can have several roots among Jewish populations. It can mean farmworker. It can also be a Jewish occupational surname from the Romanian word acar, meaning switchman. Açar was also noted as a Sephardic surname, first attested among Jews in Iberia.

Notable people with the surname include:

- Cavit Acar (born 2000), Turkish freestyle wrestler
- Denho Acar (born 1974), Turkish mobster
- Feride Acar, Turkish sociologist and women's rights activist
- Hasan Hüseyin Acar (born 1994), Turkish footballer
- İsmail Acar (born 1971), Turkish painter
- Jacques Acar (writer) (1937–1976), Belgian comic book writer and journalist
- Jacques F. Acar (1931–2020), French doctor and microbiologist, who specialized in antibiotics
- Kuzgun Acar (1928–1976), Turkish sculptor
- Numan Acar (born 1974), Turkish-German actor and film producer
- Selim Acar, Turkish businessman
- Serkan Acar (1948–2013), Turkish football player
- Sevdiye Nilgün Acar (born 1958), Turkish artist
- Sırrı Acar (born 1943), Turkish wrestler
- Timur Acar (born 1979), Turkish actor
- Tolgahan Acar (born 1986), Turkish footballer
- Tunay Açar (born 1989), Turkish footballer
- Veli Acar (born 1981), Turkish footballer
- Yeliz Açar (born 1997), Turkish and Azerbaijani footballer

== See also ==
- Acar (disambiguation)
- Acker
- Akar
- Aker (name)
- Eker (surname)
