= Noor Theatre Company =

Theatre organization in New York City

Noor Theatre Company is a New York City-based theatre organization founded in June 2010 that supports, develops, and produces the work of Middle Eastern Americans and artists of the diaspora. The group's aims to counter negative stereotypes through theatrical work that overcomes cultural differences.

"Noor" means "light" in both Persian and Arabic, reflecting the intention to enlighten audiences to the experiences of Middle Eastern people.

== Background ==
Noor Theatre Company was founded by Lameece Issaq, Executive Director Maha Chehlaoui, and Nancy Vitale joining as Producing Artistic Director. Issaq serves as the first and only artistic director. Noor Theatre Company is a company-in-residence at the New York Theatre Workshop. Through this partnership, the company has been able to workshop and develop new plays.

Noor Theatre Company has partnered with other institutions and universities to engage with the larger New York community. Notable partnered events include "Queer Stories from New York, Berlin, and Beyond" presented with The Lark, a reading from Saadallah Wannous's Rituals and Signs of Transformations with the Martin E. Segal Theatre Center, and "Building a New" with New York Center for Architecture.

== Notable productions ==
The company has premiered six original productions since its inception in 2010.

=== Food and Fadwa ===
The inaugural production, Food and Fadwa, was written by Lameece Issaq and Jacob Kader. Performed from May 18 to June 24, 2012, this comedy-drama follows the intimate life of a Palestinian family in Israeli-occupied Bethlehem. The protagonist Fadwa (played by Lameece Issaq herself) is living at home to care for her increasingly demented father Baba (Laith Nakli). Fadwa's sister Dalal (Maha Chehlaoui) is set to marry her betrothed Amir (Arian Moayed) so family members begin to arrive for the wedding. An American-assimilated cousin Hayat (Heather Raffo) arrives, sparking envy in Fadwa. Specifically, this is the catalyst for the return of Emir's older brother Youssif (Haaz Sleiman) who Fadwa had a childhood romance with. Amidst the realities of mandated curfews and Israeli checkpoints, interpersonal relationships continue. Fadwa spends her time imagining she is hosting a cooking show for a live audience while preparing food for Dalal's wedding. She makes traditional Arab recipes such as Baba ghanoush and Hummus while talking to her imagined studio audience and making comments on the unfolding events. While some critics were unimpressed by the melodramatic plot because it did not center on the violence of the Israeli–Palestinian conflict, others found richness in character details and comedy.

=== Dead Are My People ===
Dead Are My People is the company's first full-length production which ran from November 4 to 11, 2018. The title draws from the Kahlil Gibran poem "Dead Are My People" about the Great Famine of Mount Lebanon. The play follows the character Nicola Najjour (played by Adam Bakri) as he arrives from Mount Lebanon to the United States to find his uncle. This journey leads Nicola to a small town called Lakewood, located in the Jim Crow south where he befriends a black man named Weavel. The two navigate the racial landscape of 1918's American South as the play explores the themes of immigration, assimilation, and the legacies of white supremacy in the United States.

The play combines the writing and lyrics of Ismail Khalidi (writer) with music by Hadi Eldebek from the Silk Road Ensemble for a blend of classical Arabic music with the blues and folk sounds of the Deep South.

World Premieres
Year	Production	Writers	Director	Partnerships (if applicable)
2012	Food and Fadwa	Lameece Issaq and Jacob Kader	Shana Gold	New York Theatre Workshop
2013	Myth In Motion	The ensemble	Pirronne Yousefzadeh	Students of New Jersey Institute of Technology/Rutgers Theatre
2014	The Myth Project: Phoenicia Flowers, The In-Between, and I am Gordafarid	Noelle Ghoussaini; Kareem Fahmy; and Pirronne Yousefzadeh	Noelle Ghoussaini; Kareem Fahmy; Pirronne Yousefzadeh and Sanaz Ghajarrahimi	
2018	Dead Are My People	Ismail Khalidi (writer)	Leah C. Gardiner	

== Annual programming ==
Each fall the company hosts the "Highlight Reading Series" and each spring the company hosts the "48 Hour Forum." The profits from both are directed back into Noor Theatre Company.

=== Highlight Reading Series ===
The Highlight Reading Series was created by Former Producing Artistic Director Nancy Vitale. Since its inception in 2010, this event has operated as a space to support and spread the work of playwrights of Middle Eastern descent when the company cannot afford to produce all works.

Several plays in the Highlight series are later produced by other organizations. For example, Heather Raffo's play Noura, which was read in 2016, later opened at Playwrights Horizons in 2018.

Highlight Reading Series Works
Year	Date	Production	Writers
2010	September 13	Forgotten Bread	Sevan Greene
2010	October 18	Jihad Jones and the Kalashnikov Babies	Yussef El Guindi
2010	November 15	The Hour of Feeling	Mona Mansour
2010	December 13	Fit for the Queen: A Tragicomedy	Betty Shamieh
2011	September 19	I Am Yusef and This is my Brother	Amir Nizar Zuabi
2011	November 14	The Strangest	Betty Shamieh
2011	December 5	BABA	Denmo Ibrahim
2012	November 12	The Prophet	Hassan Abdulrazzak
2013	September 23	Sabra Falling	Ismail Khalidi (writer)
2013	October 7	The Shadow Spirit	Translated by Dr. Safi Mahfouz and Dr. Marvin Carlson
2013	November 18	The House of Strength	Rahaleh Nassri
2014	September 15	Threesome	Yussef El Guindi
2014	October 7	What Happened to Noura?	Nine Courageous Women at Queens College
2014	November 18	The Vagrant	Mona Mansour
2014	December 9	Behfarmaheen (If You Please)	Barzin Akhavan
2015	September 29	Taha	Amer Hlehel
2015	October 12	Nahda: Five Visions of an Arab Awakening	Sevan K. Greene
2015	November 17	Brother Gary	Ramiz Monsef
2015	December 8	Oh My Sweet Land	Amir Nizar Zuabi
2016	September 26	Dead Are My People	Ismail Khalidi (writer)
2016	November 15	Fireworks	Dalia Taha; Translated by Clem Naylor
2016	December 13	Noura	Heather Raffo
2017	September 26	Wooden Boxes	Houssein Almoreey
2017	October 10	330 Pegasus	Melis Aker
2017	November 14	Selling Kabul	Sylvia Khoury
2017	December 12	You, The Fire, and Me	Sevan K. Greene

=== 48 Hour Forum ===
In May 2015, this forum was created to address media representation of the Middle East. The executive director and artistic director of Noor Theatre spend months gathering headlines from and about The Middle East that they believe offer a balance between prominent topics such as ISIS and Sex trafficking and more joyful daily victories. These headlines are then drawn at random by the participants. A collaboration of five playwrights, five directors, and twenty company actors spend twelve hours writing and thirty-six hours rehearsing an original production inspired by the headline. The five new fifteen-minute productions are required to include thirty seconds of silence, music, or a second language. The fast-paced nature of this festival is meant to spark conversation about how events in the Middle East are represented in the news cycle and how this news immediately affects various communities.

What is different about this forum is that the creative process is opened to guest playwrights, actors, and directors from all backgrounds. In 2015, Mona Mansour, Keith Josef Adkins, and Shana Gold were a few of the writers and directors invited. In 2016, the participating writers were David Zellnik, Kara Lee Corthron, Leila Buck, Laith Nakli, and Clare Barron.

In 2018, the festival was sponsored in part by the New York State Council on the Arts. Playwrights Anima Henry, Sevan K. Green, Melisa Tien, and Michele Lowe were joined by directors Ed Sylvanus Iskandar and Ralph Peña.

== Awards and grants ==
Noor Theatre won an Obie Award and accompanying grant in 2016.

In the fall of 2018, Noor Theatre was awarded an Artists Advancing Cultural Change grant from the Pop Culture Collaborative. This grant was used to commission new work from three Middle Eastern American writers in the 2019–2020 season. These new works were not restricted to theatre and were encouraged to be broadcast to a larger audience through digital media and film. Artistic Director Lameece Issaq, Arian Moayed, and Mike Mosallam were the artists chosen to produce new work for Noor Theatre Company through this grant.
