= Achar =

Achar may refer to:

- Achar (Buddhism), a lay Buddhist ritual specialist in Cambodia
- Acar, Dutch/Indonesian pickle
- Achar or Achan (biblical figure), an Israelite referred to in the Book of Joshua and the First Book of Chronicles
- Achar, Uruguay, a town in the Tacuarembó Department of Uruguay
- Achar!, a 2004–2005 Singaporean English-language sitcom
- Achar (crater), a crater on Mars
- South Asian pickle, a food native to South Asia
- Achar (surname)

== See also ==
- Acar (disambiguation)
- Achara clan, a Jat clan of Rajasthan
- Atchara, Philippine pickled papaya
