= Mamdouh Al Aker =

Palestinian physician and politician (born 1943)

- Born: 1943 (age 82–83); Nablus, Mandatory Palestine
- Education: Cairo University; King's College Hospital
- Years active: 1970s–present
- Medical career
- Profession: Physician
- Institutions: Makassed Hospital; Birzeit University; Al Quds University; Augusta Victoria Hospital
- Sub-specialties: Urology
- Research: Surgical urology

Mamdouh Al Aker (Arabic: ممدوح العكر, romanized: Mamdūḥ al-ʻAkir; born 1943) is a Palestinian physician and politician. He was part of several delegations in the meetings with Israel and served as a member of the Palestinian Higher Education Council between 1994 and 2018.

== Early life and education ==
Al Aker was born in Nablus, Mandatory Palestine, in 1943. He graduated from the Medical School of Cairo University in 1969. During his university studies he was a member of the Marxist Popular Front for the Liberation of Palestine.

Al Aker became a fellow at the Royal College of Surgeons in Edinburgh in 1977. He received training in urology at King's College Hospital in London from 1979 to 1981.

== Career and activities ==
Following his graduation Al Aker worked in Kuwait as a physician between 1970 and 1973. He continued his profession at Makassed Hospital in Jerusalem after completing his training in London.

Al Aker was a member of the Palestinian delegation in the Peace Conference held in Madrid in October 1991 and in the following negotiations between Palestinians and Israel. He was part of the Palestinian group who developed the Oslo Accords in 1993. However, he left it due to the fact that the proposed agreement did not contain any item to stop Jewish settlements in the West Bank, to have a shared control over the Jerusalem municipality and to free all Palestinian prisoners arrested by Israel. Because of these he became a critic of the Palestinian Authority in 1994 when it was founded. He has also criticized the policies of Israel in the West Bank. He was made a member of the Palestinian Higher Education Council in 1994 and held the post until August 2018. He headed the PA's human rights organization in the 2000s.

Al Aker was the vice president of the Birzeit University and was involved in the establishment of the first Palestinian Medical School at Al Quds University in 1995, being a member of its steering committee. He is a consultant of urology at the Augusta Victoria Hospital in East Jerusalem.

Al Aker has been a member of various organizations. He is the cofounder the Mandela Institute for Palestinian Political Prisoners and served as the vice president of the Palestinian Independent Commission for Citizens' Rights. He is the treasurer of the Ramallah-based Barenboim-Said Center for Music.

=== Imprisonment ===
Al Aker was arrested by the Israeli forces several times. They accused him of having connections with the Palestinian resistance groups, and he was imprisoned in 1991 without any formal charge. He was arrested in 2002 and imprisoned for 40 days in solitary confinement.
