= Makassed Hospital =

Hospital in East Jerusalem, Palestine

Al-Makassed Islamic Charitable Society Hospital
- Makassed Islamic Charitable Society
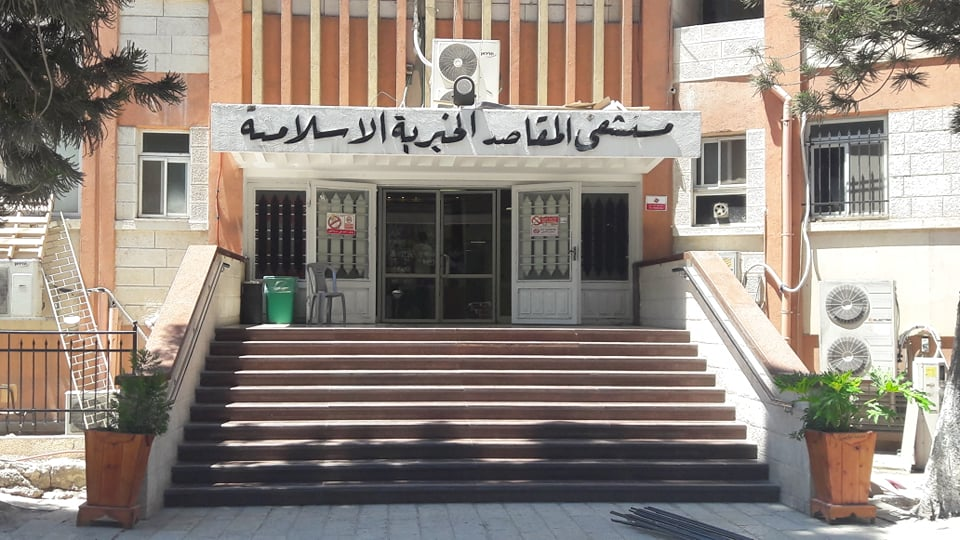
- Main entrance of the hospital

Geography
- Location: At-Tur, Mount of Olives, East Jerusalem, Palestine
- Coordinates: 31.780906°N 35.245916°E

Organisation
- Care system: Private
- Type: Teaching, District General
- Religious affiliation: Islam
- Affiliated university: Al-Quds University

Services
- Emergency department: Yes
- Beds: 250

History
- Founded: 1968; 58 years ago

Links
- Website: almakassed.org

Al-Makassed Islamic Charitable Society Hospital (Arabic: مستشفى المقاصد) is a Muslim Community founded teaching hospital and charitable hospital of the Palestinian Arab's charitable founded by Makassed Islamic Charitable Society. There is one of district general hospital from part of six hospitals in the East Jerusalem Hospitals Network. It has 250 beds and is situated on Mount of Olives in East Jerusalem. It serves as a tertiary referral hospital mainly for the Arab population of the Palestinian territories, namely the West Bank (including East Jerusalem) and the Gaza Strip, but also provides health care for the Israeli population when they meet obstacles using other facilities. It is a teaching hospital of Al-Quds University Faculty of Medicine.

The hospital is part of the East Jerusalem Hospitals Network together with the Augusta Victoria Hospital, the Red Crescent Maternity Hospital (also called Palestinian Red Crescent Society Hospital), the Saint John Eye Hospital, the Princess Basma Rehabilitation Center, and St. Joseph's Hospital.

Most of the staff and patients come the other side of the Israeli West Bank barrier which constantly causes difficulties for both groups reach the hospital.

Al-Makassed Hospital was founded in 1968 with 60 beds.
