= Acar (disambiguation) =

Acar is a type of salad made in Indonesia, Malaysia, and Singapore.

Acar may also refer to:

- Acar (surname)

== Paces ==
- Acar, Artuklu, neighborhood in Artuklu, Turkey
- Acar, Kilis, village in Kilis district, Turkey
- Acar, Dicle, neighborhood in Dicle, Turkey
- Acar, Sason, a village in Sason, Batman, Turkey

== Other ==
- Acar (bivalve), a genus of clams
- ACAR, Angular Correlation of Electron Positron Annihilation Radiation, an experimental techniques of solid-state physics
- ACAR Ground Surveillance Radar, Turkey

== See also ==
- Acarlar (disambiguation)
- Aircraft Communications Addressing and Reporting System or ACARS
