= East Jerusalem Hospitals Network =

Group of six hospitals in East Jerusalem

- East Jerusalem Hospitals Network (EJHN)
- شبكة مستشفيات القدس الشرقية
- Logo of the East Jerusalem Hospitals Network

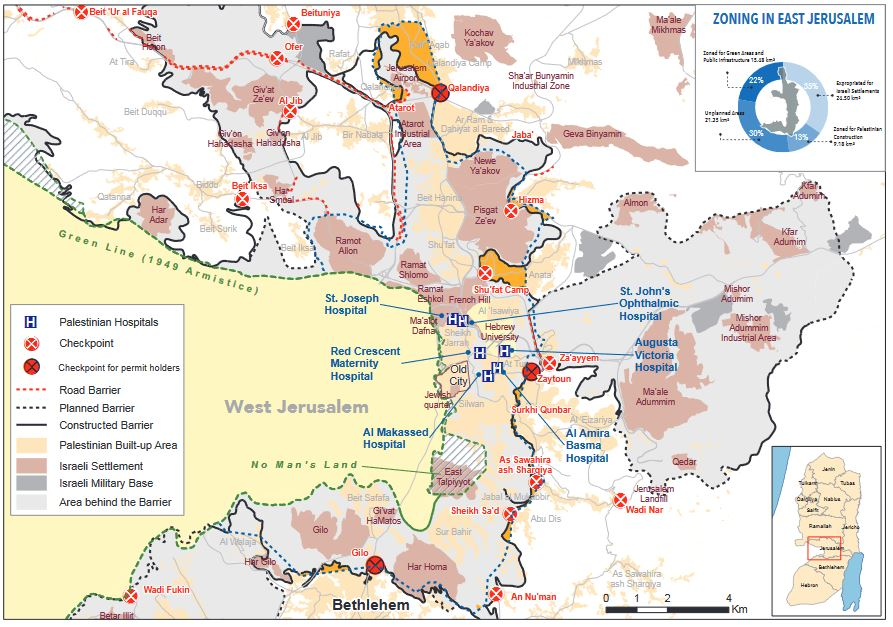
- Map of East Jerusalem Hospitals Network locations
- Abbreviation: EJHN
- Formation: 1997; 29 years ago
- Founder: Supported by Faisal Husseini
- Founded at: East Jerusalem
- Type: Healthcare network
- Legal status: Active
- Purpose: Provide specialized healthcare to Palestinians
- Headquarters: East Jerusalem
- Location: East Jerusalem, State of Palestine
- Region served: Palestinian territories
- Services: Healthcare
- Members: Six hospitals
- Official language: Arabic, English
- Secretary General: Walid Namour
- Chairman: Abdel-Qader Husseini
- Affiliations: WHO Regional Office for the Eastern Mediterranean

The East Jerusalem Hospitals Network (EJHN) (Arabic: شبكة مستشفيات القدس الشرقية) is a network of six hospitals in East Jerusalem. The network was founded in 1997 with the support of Palestinian politician Faisal Husseini. The network plays a crucial role in the Palestinian health care system.

== The six hospitals ==
The six hospitals are as follows:

- Augusta Victoria Hospital, As-Sawana (within At-Tur (Mount of Olives))
- Makassed Hospital, At-Tur (Mount of Olives)
- Saint John Eye Hospital Group, Sheikh Jarrah
- Red Crescent Maternity Hospital (also called Palestinian Red Crescent Society Hospital)
- Princess Basma Centre for Children with Disabilities
- St. Joseph's Hospital, Sheikh Jarrah, (run by the Sisters of St. Joseph of the Apparition)

== Conferences ==
- First Annual Conference: Annual East Jerusalem Hospitals Conference: “Building a Network, Improving Patient Care”, 8–9 December 2011, in Jerusalem
- Second Annual Conference: 2nd Annual East Jerusalem Hospitals Conference "Striving for Excellence Under Crisis", 30 January 2013, Jerusalem

== Management ==
- Abdel-Qader Husseini, Chairman
- Walid Namour, Secretary General
