= Aker (name) =

Aker is an English, and Turkish surname. People with the name include:

- Brian Aker (born 1972), American open-source hacker
- Don Aker (born 1955), Canadian writer and educator
- Jack Aker (born 1940), American baseball player
- John Calvin Aker (1939–2000), American judge
- Mamdouh Al Aker (born 1943), Palestinian physician and politician
- Melis Aker, Turkish playwright, screenwriter, actor, and musician
- Mustafa Ertuğrul Aker (1892–1961), Turkish soldier
- Raymond Aker (1920–2003), British navigator and historian
- Şefik Aker (1877–1964), Turkish soldier
- Stian Aker (born 1980), Norwegian polar explorer
- Tim Aker (born 1985), British politician
