= Augusta Victoria Hospital =

Hospital and church in East Jerusalem

Coordinates: 31°47′12″N 35°14′57″E

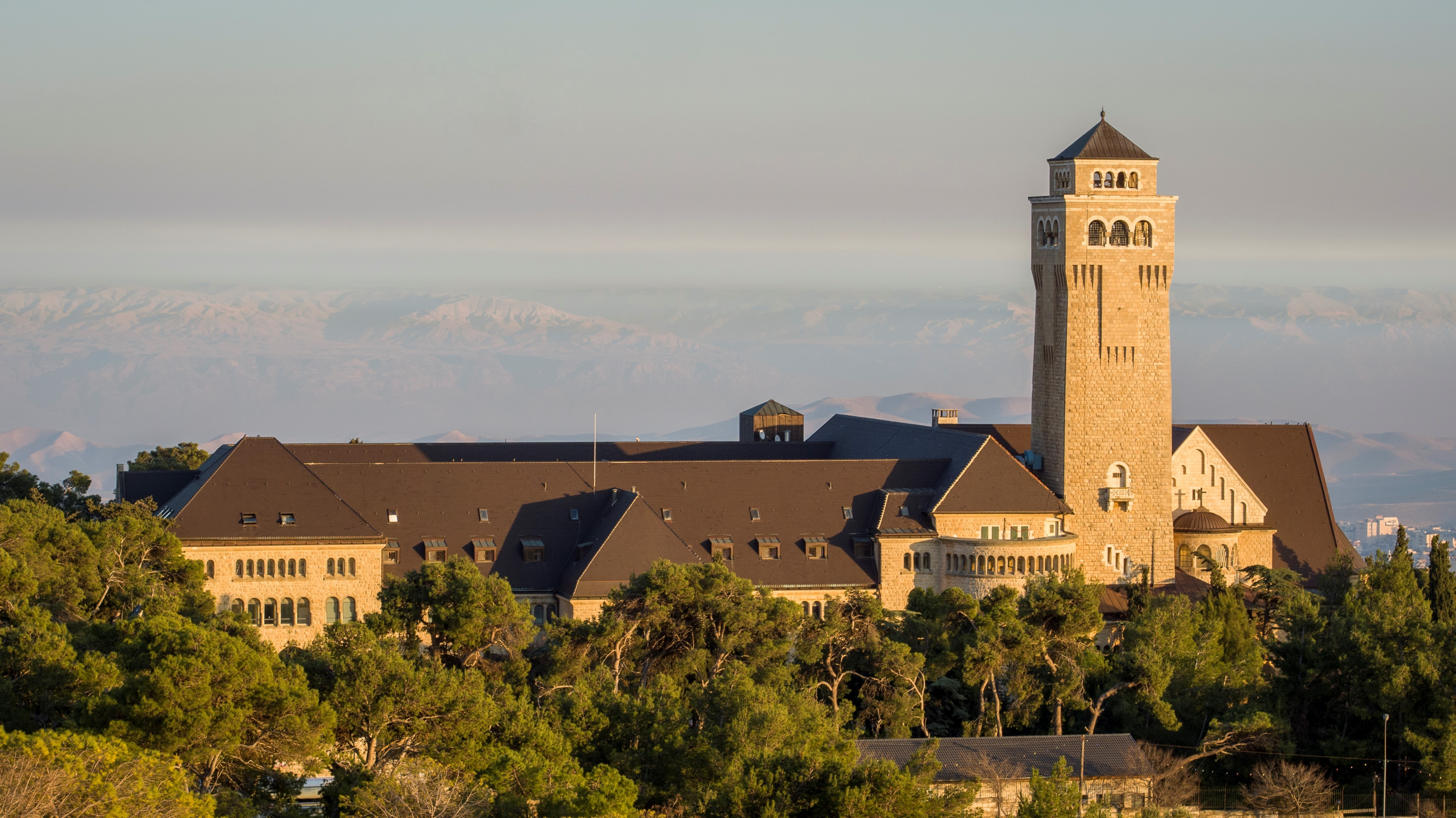
- Augusta Victoria church-hospital complex on the Mount of Olives, 2016

Geography
- Location: East Jerusalem, Palestine

Organisation
- Care system: Private
- Type: Community; specialised care (dialysis, oncology)
- Religious affiliation: Prussian Union of Churches (at first)
- Affiliated university: None
- Patron: Augusta Victoria of Schleswig-Holstein

Services
- Emergency department: No
- Beds: 171 (as of 2022)

History
- Opened: 1910 (inauguration), 1914 (finalised)

Links
- Website: www.avh.org

The Augusta Victoria Compound is a community hospital and church complex on the northern side of the Mount of Olives in East Jerusalem; the hospital is one of six which form the East Jerusalem Hospitals Network. The compound was built in 1907–1914 by the Empress Augusta Victoria Foundation as a centre for the German Protestant community in Ottoman Palestine, in addition to the slightly older Church of the Redeemer from Jerusalem's Old City. Apart from the hospital, today the complex also includes the German Protestant Church of the Ascension with a c. 50 metres (160 ft) high belltower, a meeting centre for pilgrims and tourists, an interreligious kindergarten and a café, as well as the Jerusalem branch of the German Protestant Institute of Archaeology.

Throughout much of its history, the compound was used first and foremost as a hospital, either by the military (during the First and Second World Wars and during the initial years of Jordanian rule), or for Palestinian refugees and general public (from 1950 until today), and at times also as a government or military headquarters - by the Ottoman authorities during WWI and after them by the British authorities (1915–1927).

Today, Augusta Victoria Hospital provides specialty care for Palestinians from across the West Bank and the Gaza Strip with services including a cancer centre, a dialysis unit, and a pediatric centre. It is the second largest hospital in East Jerusalem, as well as the sole remaining specialised care unit located in the West Bank or Gaza Strip.

== History ==
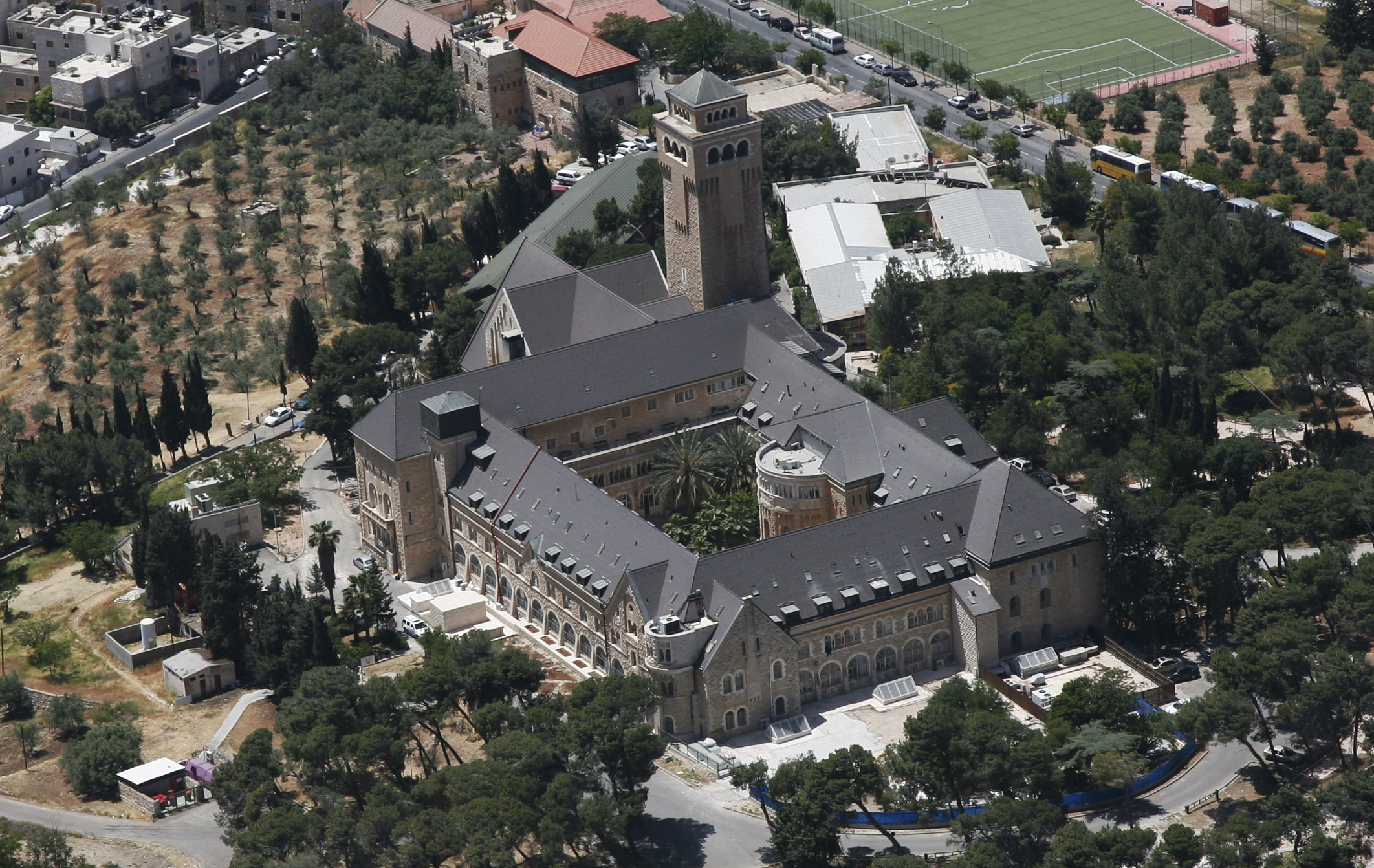
Augusta Victoria compound, aerial view

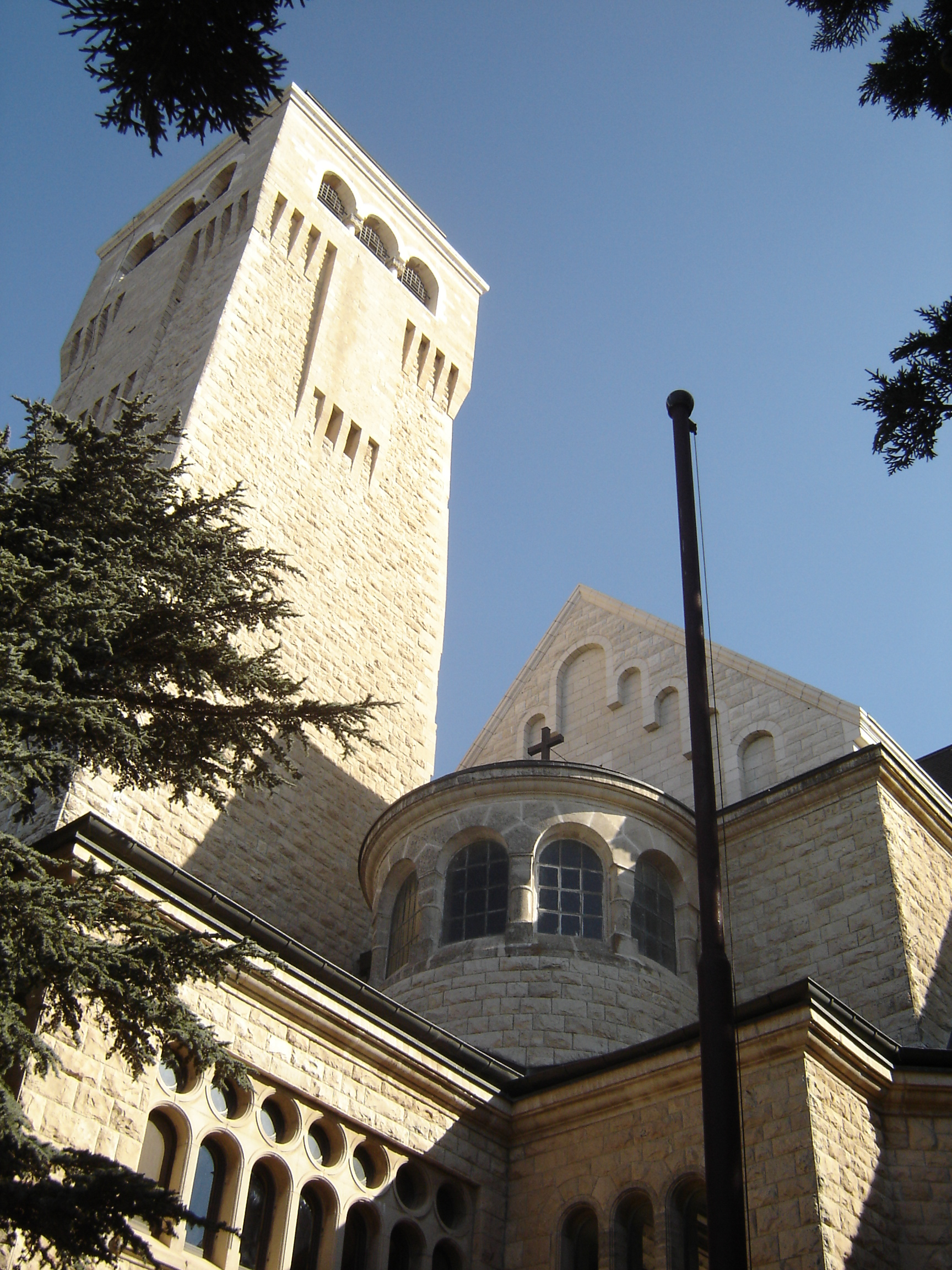
Ascension Church, Augusta Victoria compound

=== Ottoman period ===
The Augusta Victoria compound was named for Augusta Viktoria of Schleswig-Holstein, wife of German Kaiser Wilhelm II, who visited Jerusalem in 1898. The architect, Robert Leibnitz, was inspired by German palaces, such as the German Hohenzollern Castle. The complex was photographed in detail in ca. 1910, along with the inaugural celebrations, by Khalil Raad, Palestine's first Arab photographer. Although officially inaugurated on 10 April 1910, the construction was only finalised in 1914.

After the Kaiser's 1898 visit, he commissioned the construction of a guesthouse for German pilgrims. Private donations were collected throughout Germany and donators honoured with the Cross of the Mount of Olives. Many of the building materials were imported from Germany. A 60-metre high church tower was constructed with four bells, the largest of them weighing six tonnes. To transport these bells from Jaffa, the road to Jerusalem had to be widened and paved. The expense was more than double the cost of transporting the bells from Hamburg to Jaffa. Augusta Victoria was the first building in the country to have electricity, provided by a diesel generator.

During World War I, the Hospital served as German military hospital. From 1915 to 1917 the compound was used as Ottoman headquarters by Djemal Pasha. From June to December 1917, the hospital was used as headquarters for the German high command of the German expeditionary corps (Asienkorps).

=== British period ===
After the British conquest, the Augusta Victoria compound served as the headquarters of General Allenby's Egyptian Expeditionary Force and later as the headquarters of the British Military Administration of Occupied Enemy Territory (South).

From 1920 to 1927, Augusta Victoria was the official residence of the British High Commissioner of the Palestine Mandate. In 1927, the buildings were severely damaged in an earthquake and the pointy roof of the belfry had to be rebuilt shorter by 10 metres. The British headquarters moved to the Government House, on the outskirts of Jerusalem (near today's Talpiot neighbourhood). In 1928, the compound was returned to its German pre-war owner, the Empress Augusta Victoria Foundation.

The Nazi party held meetings and assemblies at Augusta Victoria under the leadership of Ludwig Buchhalter, a Templer living in the Germany Colony who was appointed head of Jerusalem branch of the Nazi party in 1934. In the mid-1930s, when the building was about to reopen as a hostel run by Deaconesses, the management decided to bar Jewish guests to preserve the institution's Christian character.

During World War II, the compound was again used as a hospital by the British.

=== Jordanian period ===
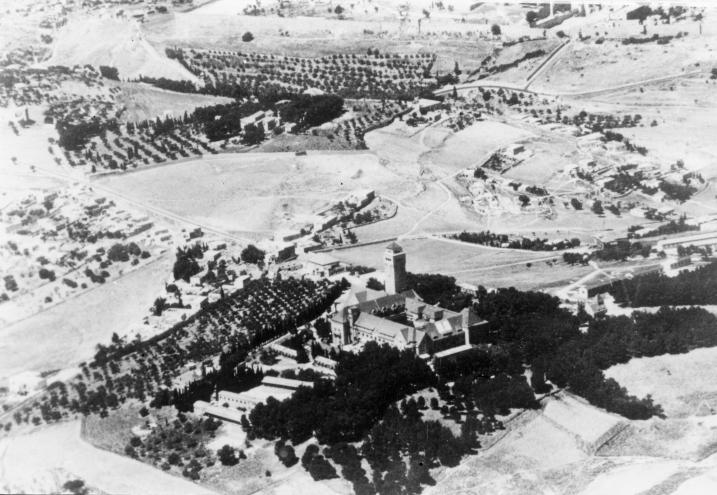
Augusta Victoria from the air 1948

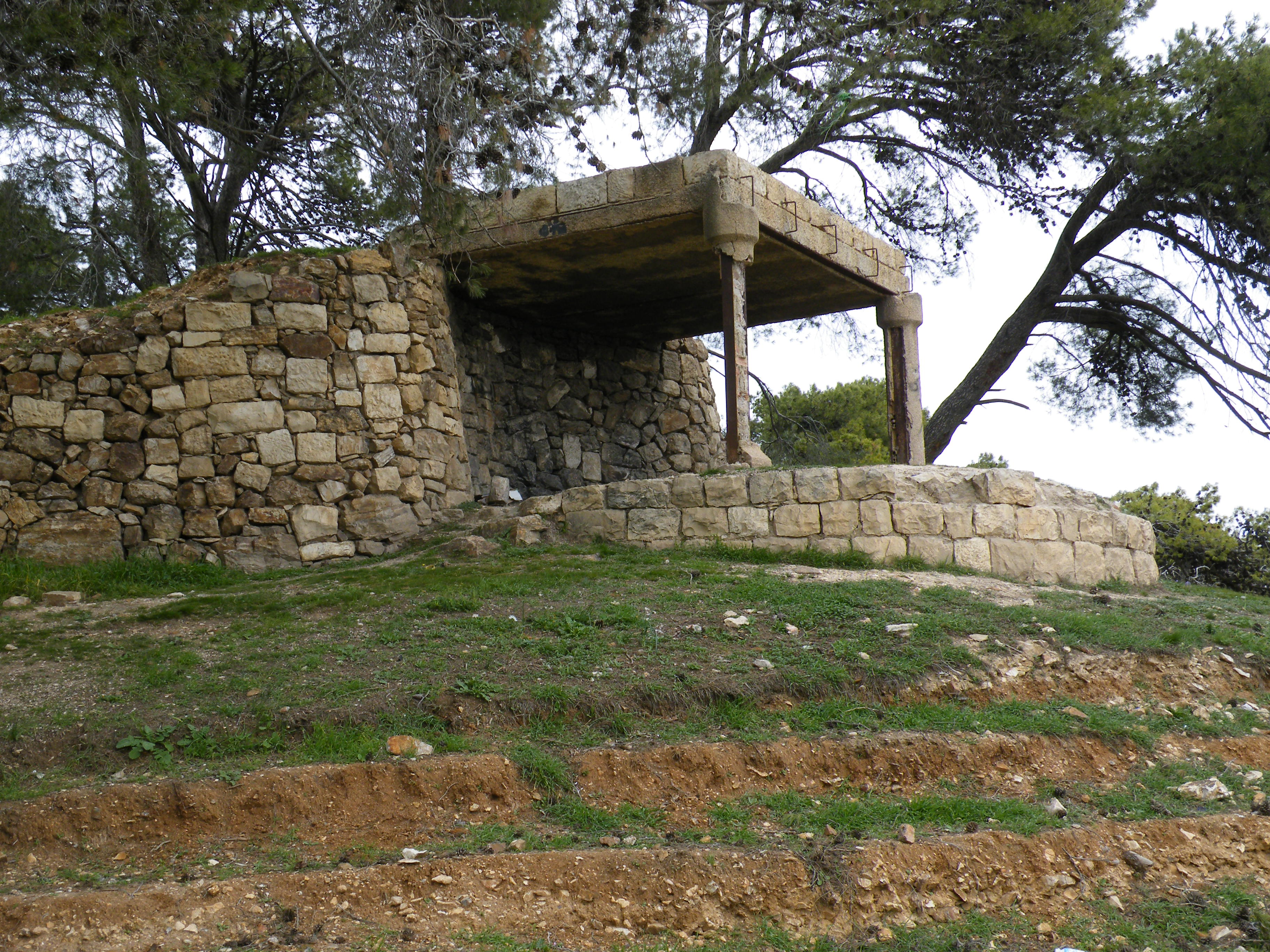
A Jordanian bunker on the grounds of Augusta Victoria

Under Jordanian administration, technically under United Nations Truce Supervision Organization control, it was a military hospital for soldiers from the Arab Legion, the de facto Jordanian regular army.

After World War II, the entire property of the German Evangelical mission to Palestine was passed into the fiduciary responsibility of the Lutheran World Federation (LWF); in 1950 the LWF established a large hospital for refugees in the compound. The hospital director was the long-time staff physician of the German Deaconess Hospital of Jerusalem, the Arab Palestinian Dr. Tawfiq Canaan, who kept this position until 1956.

Prior to the 1967 Six-Day War, the campus was fortified with several bunkers.

=== Post-1967 period ===
During the 1967 Six-Day War, the building was heavily damaged, the upper floor was devastated by fire and was only rebuilt in 1988.

== Today ==
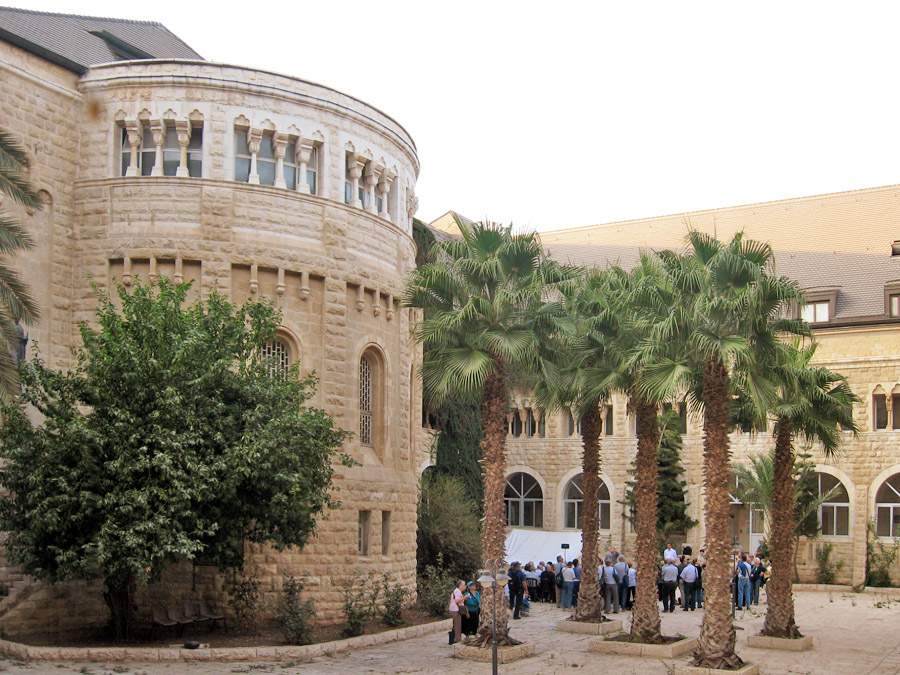
Augusta Victoria courtyard

Today, Augusta Victoria Hospital provides specialty care for Palestinians from across the West Bank and the Gaza Strip with services including a cancer centre, a dialysis unit, and a pediatric centre. In 2016, it inaugurated a bone marrow transplantation unit. It is the second-largest hospital in East Jerusalem. It runs 120 in-patient beds and treat a number of outpatients who come in for dialysis and radiation treatment, being the only facility offering radiation therapy for patients from among the entire Palestinian population of 4.5 million people.

In May 2016, Joint Commission International, a US-based body that assesses hospitals and health care facilities globally, re-accredited the hospital for another three years.

The hospital is one of six specialised medical centres in the East Jerusalem Hospitals Network, also comprising Makassed Islamic Charitable Hospital, Red Crescent Maternity Hospital, St. John's Eye Hospital, Princess Basma Rehabilitation Centre and St. Joseph's Hospital. They have been the main providers of tertiary referral care for Palestinians in the West Bank and Gaza Strip for health services for which the Ministry of Health is unable to provide, such as cancer care, cardiac and eye surgeries, neonatal intensive care, children's dialysis and physical rehabilitation of children.

Since its re-establishment in 1950, Auguste Victoria Hospital has been primarily run and financed by The Lutheran World Federation and the United Nations Relief and Works Agency for Palestine Refugees in the Near East (UNRWA). The hospital mission statement includes the provision of health care without regard to race, creed, gender, or national origin.

As of 2022, the hospital had 171 beds. During that year it performed 22,717 dialysis sessions, 18,800 chemotherapy sessions and 31,717 radiation sessions.

In 2022, US President Joe Biden visited the hospital. On 27 November 2023, German Federal President Frank-Walter Steinmeier paid a visit.

== Compound ==
The Augusta Victoria compound currently contains the following buildings and institutions:

- Augusta Victoria Hospital
- Church of the Ascension (German Protestant)
  - Evangelical (Protestant) Pilgrims and Meeting Centre (Evangelisches Pilger- und Begegnungszentrum der Kaiserin Auguste Victoria-Stiftung)
  - An interreligious kindergarten
  - Café Auguste Victoria
- The German Protestant Institute of Archaeology (Deutsches Evangelisches Institut für Altertumswissenschaft des Heiligen Landes), Jerusalem branch (the second one is in Amman)

The rectory of the pastor of the Lutheran Church of the Redeemer is also located on the site, along with administrative offices and living quarters of the Jerusalem offices of The Lutheran World Federation (LWF).

The guesthouse is run by the LWF for international volunteers and guests.

=== Oncology services ===
The hospital has a Department of Oncology which is an advanced centre for cancer treatment. The department consists of the Unit for Medical Oncology, the Unit for Radiation Oncology, and the Unit for Surgical Oncology.

A pediatric oncology ward for Palestinian children opened in April 2005 in a joint project with the Peres Center for Peace, various Italian foundations and the Hadassah University Hospital, which trained the oncology and nursing staff.

== See also ==
- Patient's Friends Society-Jerusalem
