= Betty Shamieh =

American playwright, author, screenwriter and actor

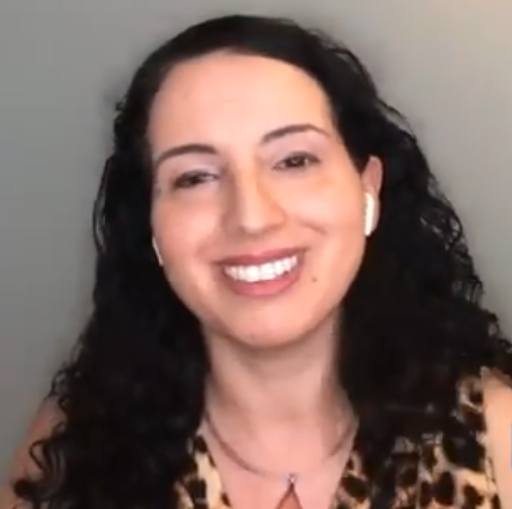
- In a HowlRound interview in 2020
- Education: Harvard University
- Occupations: Writer, actor
- Website: www.bettyshamieh.com

Betty Shamieh is an American playwright, author, screenwriter, and actor of Palestinian descent. She has written 15 plays and one novel.

== Productions ==
=== Roar ===
Shamieh became the first Palestinian-American to have a play premiere off-Broadway with the 2004 premiere of Roar, a drama about a Palestinian family. Tony Award-nominated Marion McClinton directed, and Annabella Sciorra and Sarita Choudhury starred.

=== Malvolio ===
Malvolio premiered at the Classical Theatre of Harlem in the summer of 2023, co-directed by Ian Belknap and Ty Jones.

=== The Black Eyed ===
The Black Eyed's original premiere was at The Magic Theatre in 2005. The off-Broadway premiere of The Black Eyed was at the New York Theatre Workshop in 2007, directed by Sam Gold with a cast of Aysan Celik, Lameece Issaq, Jeanine Serralles, and Emily Swallow.

The Theatre Fournos of Athens, Greece, produced a translation of the play in Greek.

=== Fit for a Queen ===
FIT FOR A QUEEN was first produced by the Classical Theatre of Harlem in 2016.

=== Free Radicals ===
Free Radicals was translated into Dutch by the Het Zuidelijk Toneel in 2012. She was also an artist-in-residence at the same theatre.

== List of plays ==
- Malvolio
- Roar
- The Black Eyed
- Fit for a Queen
- Chocolate in Heart
- Territories
- As Soon as Impossible
- Free Radicals
- Again and Against
- The Strangest
- The Machine
- The Alter-ego of an Arab-American Assimilationist
- Codes of Honor
- Veritas
- Dearborn
- Last stop to Andalusia

== Published novels ==
- Too Soon, Avid Reader Press/Simon & Schuster

== Published plays ==
- The Black Eyed & Architecture, Broadway Play Publishing Inc.
- Roar, Broadway Play Publishing Inc.
- The Strangest, Broadway Play Publishing Inc.
- Malvolio, Broadway Play Publishing Inc.
