= Patient's Friends Society-Jerusalem =

Palestinian charity

Patient's Friends Society جمعية أصدقاء المريض الخيرية
- Founded: 1980
- Founder: Palestinian academics and professional
- Type: Non-profit
- Purpose: Palestinians
- Location: Jerusalem (Palestine)
- Region served: Palestinian Territories
- Key people: Nabil El-Jabari (President); Firyal Baz Baz (VP); Carol Jabari (Executive Director); Rajai Shurafa (Treasurer)
- Website: http://pfsjerusalem.org/

Patient's Friends Society - Jerusalem (PFS; Arabic: جمعية أصدقاء المريض-القدس) is a Palestinian non-governmental organization founded in 1980 by Palestinian academics and health professionals. The Society is located on the grounds of Augusta Victoria Hospital on the Mount of Olives, Jerusalem. PFS is a registered independent nonprofit organization and operates on external funding.

The Society provides health education and counseling services for the Palestinian public and professionals; conducts research and promotes 'healthy lifestyles'. PFS makes available bone density screening.

"Sunrise," a cancer support group for women was founded by three cancer patients in 2000. PFS provides psycho-social support for patients, survivors and their families from all over the country. PFS also provides lymphoedema care and support as well as mastectomy bras and prostheses.

PFS was awarded the International Achievement Award from the American Cancer Society in 2006, for being an exemplary model of excellence in partnership in the global fight against cancer.

Patient's Friends Society-Jerusalem is a member of The MAX Foundation, UICC, Reach to Recovery (RRI) and the Mediterranean Task Force for Cancer Control (MTCC)
