= Emily de Vialar =

French Roman Catholic saint

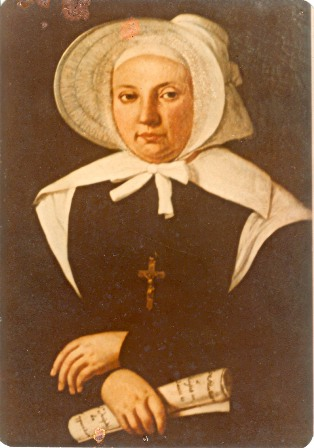
Emily de Vialar

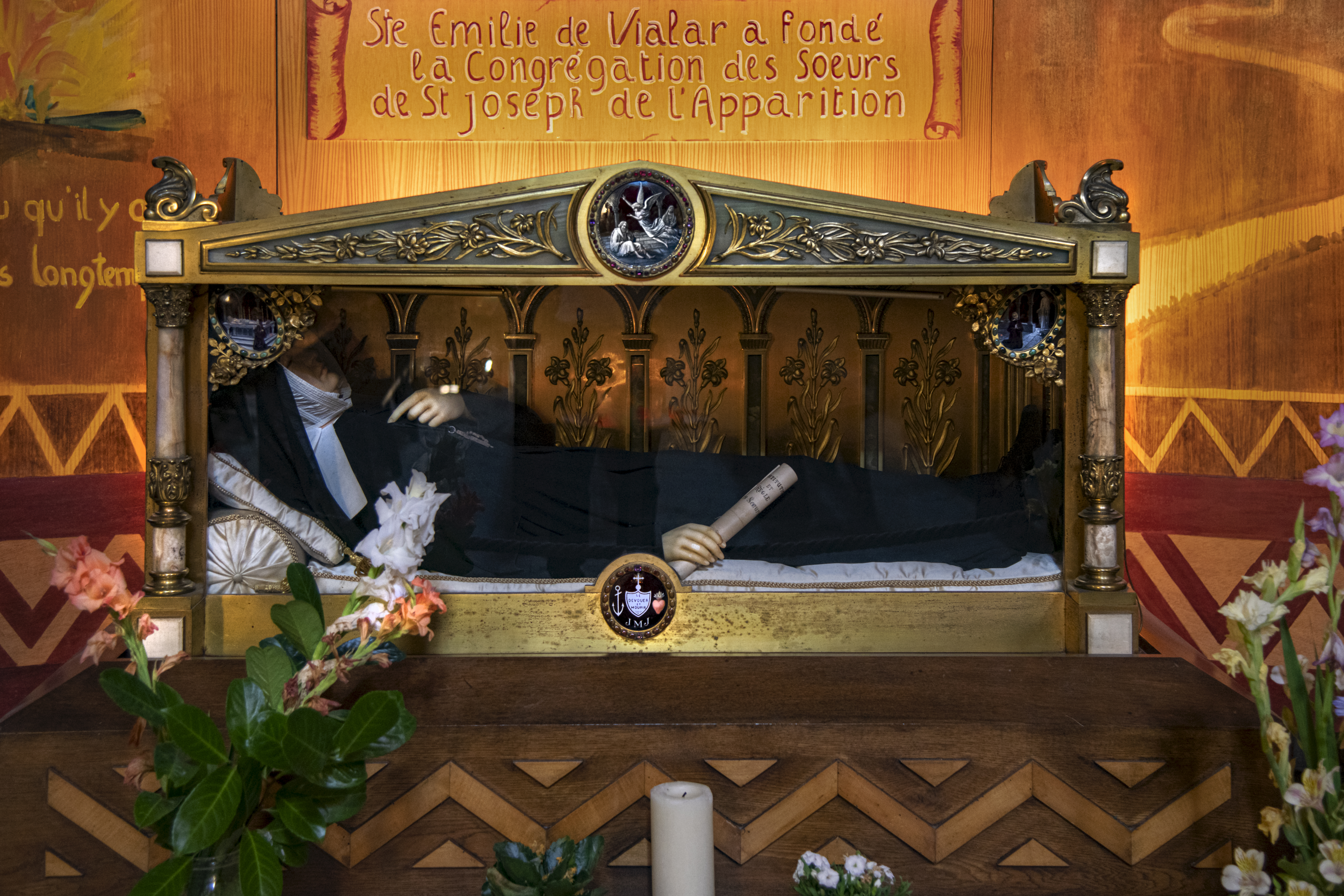
Her Reliquary in Gaillac.

Emily de Vialar or Émilie de Vialar (1797–1856) was a French nun who founded the missionary congregation of the Sisters of St. Joseph of the Apparition. She is venerated as a saint by the Catholic Church.

== Life ==
Emily de Vialar was born on 12 September 1797 to Jacques and Antoinette Portal de Vialar, in Gaillac. Her father was a doctor. Emily was born 3 years after the Reign of Terror, in the same year as Pope Pius VI was taken prisoner by French troops. She was the oldest of 3 children and was baptized in secret. At a young age, Emily was taught by her mother how to read.

At the age of thirteen she went to the Parisian college of the Abbaye-au-Bois Ladies, for young ladies of quality, accompanied by her mother, who became ill on the long journey. Despite the best efforts of Emily's father, on 17 September 1810 her mother died at the age of 35. At the age of fifteen, Emily returned to Gaillac to live with her father and two younger brothers. She found that her father, overwhelmed with grief had relinquished management of the household to Toinon, a devoted but autocratic servant.

In her attempts to help the poor, the old and the destitute, Emily invited them to the house, causing considerable tension in the household. Other young women joined her efforts. In 1832 her maternal grandfather left her an inheritance, with which she bought a house for herself and her companions. Inspired by Matthew 1:20, where an angel appeared to Joseph to reassure him: "Joseph, son of David, do not be afraid to take Mary, your bride, because what is generated in her comes from the Holy Spirit," and with the help of the bishop of Albi, François-Marie de Gauly, on Christmas, Emily and three other women established the congregation of the Sisters of St. Joseph of the Apparition.

Her brother Agostino lived in French Algeria and proposed to open a hospital in Boufarik, near Algiers. Emily and her first companions arrived at a time of an outbreak of cholera. She used the money her grandfather left her to open hospitals and schools. Emily and 17 other sisters received a formal approval for the rule of congregation in 1835. However, in 1843 the bishop of Algiers had all the nuns return to France. Emily left France to establish schools and hospitals in Cyprus, Tripoli, and Beirut.

In 1845, Emily was on her way from Tunisia to Algeria when the ship on which she was traveling was caught in a terrible storm for nine days. Emily vowed “that wherever they landed safe and sound, she would open a house and dedicate it to St Paul”. The ship came to rest at Malta, where St. Paul had also been shipwrecked. There Emily opened one of the first Catholic schools for young ladies.

Meanwhile back in Gaillac the local superior, deceived by an unscrupulous businessman, had accumulated debts. She abandoned the Congregation and sued for the return of his dowry. Beset by slander and creditors Mother Emily was forced to leave her hometown. Her inheritance now long gone on the many institutions she built, in 1852 Emily found help and hope in Marseilles with the benevolent acceptance of Eugène de Mazenod, founder of the Missionary Oblates of Mary Immaculate.

Emily de Vialar died in Marseilles on 24 August 1856. "The saint is dead," said the poor people who knew her kindness. She was declared on 24 June 1951; her feast day is 24 August in the General Roman Calendar, and celebrated on 17 June by the Sisters of St. Joseph of the Apparition.
