= St. Joseph's Hospital, Jerusalem =

Catholic general hospital in East Jerusalem

St. Joseph's Hospital
- East Jerusalem Hospitals Network
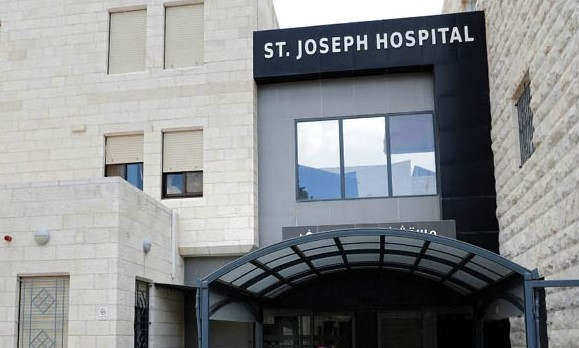
- Main entrance to the hospital

Geography
- Location: Sheikh Jarrah, East Jerusalem, Palestine
- Coordinates: 31°47′46″N 35°13′54″E

Organisation
- Care system: Public
- Type: General hospital
- Religious affiliation: Catholic Church (Sisters of St. Joseph of the Apparition)
- Network: East Jerusalem Hospitals Network

Services
- Emergency department: Yes

Helipads
- Helipad: No

History
- Constructed: 1954–1956
- Opened: 1956

St. Joseph's Hospital is a Catholic general hospital in East Jerusalem, established in 1956 at the initiative of the Sisters of St. Joseph of the Apparition, as a replacement for their St. Louis Hospital that remained on the Israeli side of divided Jerusalem, following the 1949 Armistice Agreements.

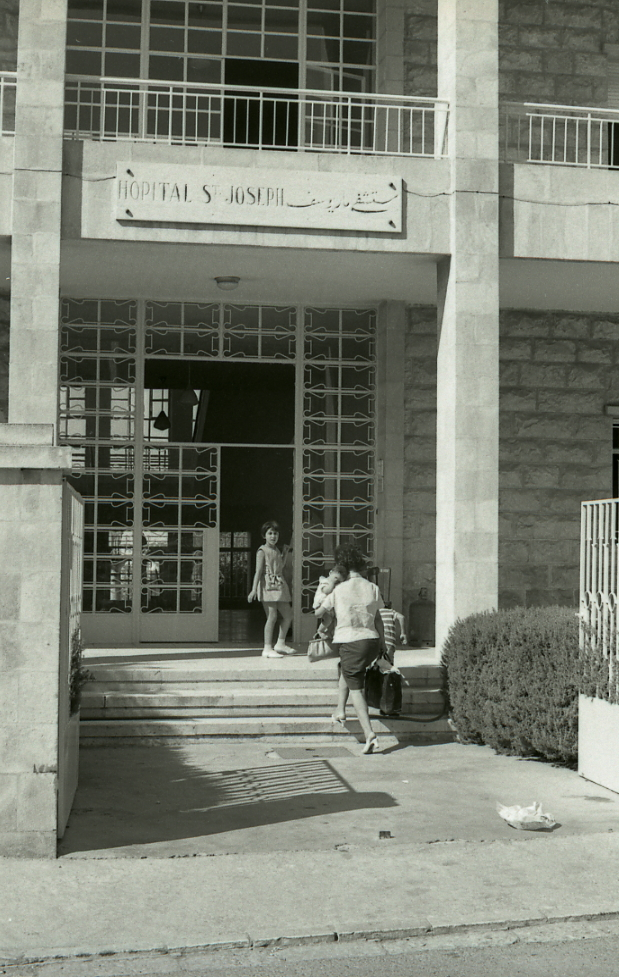
Entrance to the hospital in 1967

The hospital is part of the East Jerusalem Hospitals Network, which is part of the Palestinian health care system in East Jerusalem and the West Bank. The hospital also occasionally treats patients from the Gaza Strip.

== History ==
The Sisters of St. Joseph of the Apparition established St. Louis Hospital near Jerusalem's old city wall in 1851 to serve the poor and destitute, providing assistance to every patient regardless of religion, race, gender, culture, lifestyle, or economic status, serving all who turn to it.

Following the armistice agreements at the end of the 1948 Arab–Israeli War, the border between Israel and Jordan was established near the hospital, and it remained on the Israeli side, close to the municipal border line, while access to it was denied to residents of the Old City and East Jerusalem. Therefore, it was decided to establish a new hospital in the eastern part of the city, in the Sheikh Jarrah neighborhood.

The construction of the hospital began in 1954 and was completed in 1956. The hospital's first manager was Lorand Gaspar, a French engineer, surgeon, and poet, who moved to Jerusalem to manage the construction.

The hospital is located in the northern part of the Sheikh Jarrah neighborhood, on a plot between Nablus Road to the west, Raghib al-Nashashibi Street to the south, and Klarmon Gnu Street to the north. The area was designated for public buildings and hospitals in the Jerusalem master plan prepared by the British urban planner Henry Kendall in 1944. On the other side of Nashashibi Street, St. John's Hospital is also located, and on the other side of Clermont Gnu Street, the Jordanian government built a governmental hospital in the 1960s. After the Six Day War, the Israeli government decided to expropriate the Jordanian hospital compound and established a government office compound there. The Jordanian government hospital was transferred to the Israel Police and became part of the national headquarters compound. An empty lot adjacent to St. Joseph's Hospital, at the corner of Clermont Gnu Street and Nablus Road, originally designated for the expansion of St. Joseph Hospital, was handed over in 1997 to "Amana", the Israeli settlement organization. Following a lengthy legal battle, which failed, against the expropriation of the plot of land, "Amana" inaugurated an office building on the plot, which serves as its headquarters.

Part of the hospital's budget was funded by an annual donation from the United States government, but in September 2018, President Donald Trump decided to cut more than $20 million from the American support given to Palestinian hospitals in East Jerusalem, including St. Joseph.

During the COVID-19 pandemic, St. Joseph's Hospital was the first in East Jerusalem to open the Corona Department. As a gesture of goodwill, on the eve of Independence Day on April 28, 2020, Mayor Moshe Lion asked the Israeli Air Force to change the course of its flyover over pass hospitals, in salute to medical teams, to also include St. Joseph's Hospital.

On May 13, 2022, the funeral procession of Shireen Abu Akleh, a journalist who worked for the Al-Jazeera and was killed by gunfire in Jenin, started at the hospital. As her casket was being transported from the hospital, hundreds of people gathered outside the hospital. Israeli police burst through the gates of the hospital and attacked mourners with batons and stun grenades, some repeatedly hitting and kicking pallbearers who were backed against a wall, resulting in her coffin nearly falling to the ground. The coffin was later loaded onto a hearse and transported to the Cathedral of the Annunciation of the Virgin for the funeral, and from there carried on foot to the Mount Zion Cemetery where she was buried next to her parents. The European Union released a statement saying it was "appalled by the violence in the St Joseph hospital compound and the level of unnecessary force exercised by Israeli police throughout the funeral procession."

== Gallery ==
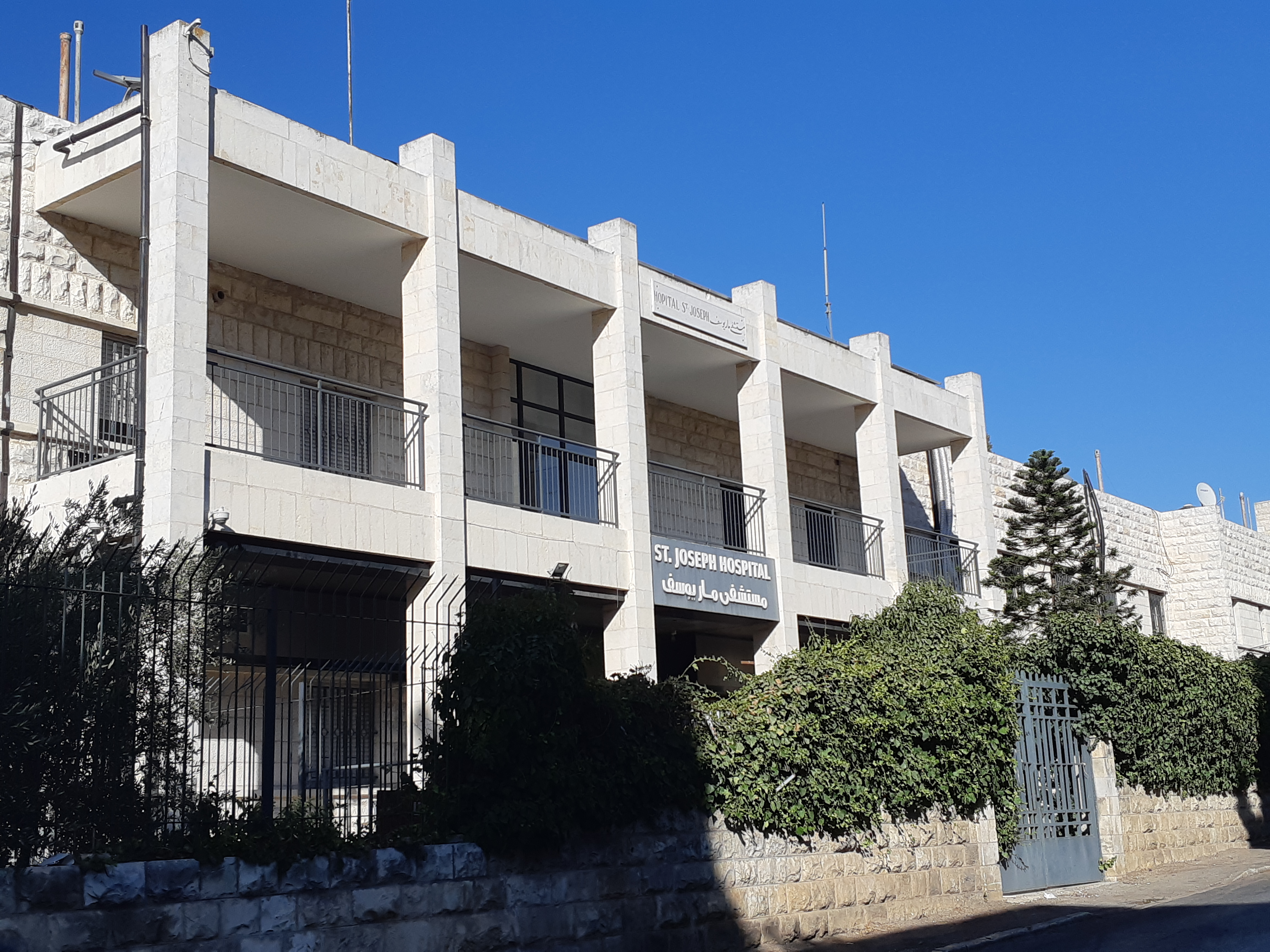
Old entrance to the hospital from Raghib al-Nashashibi Street

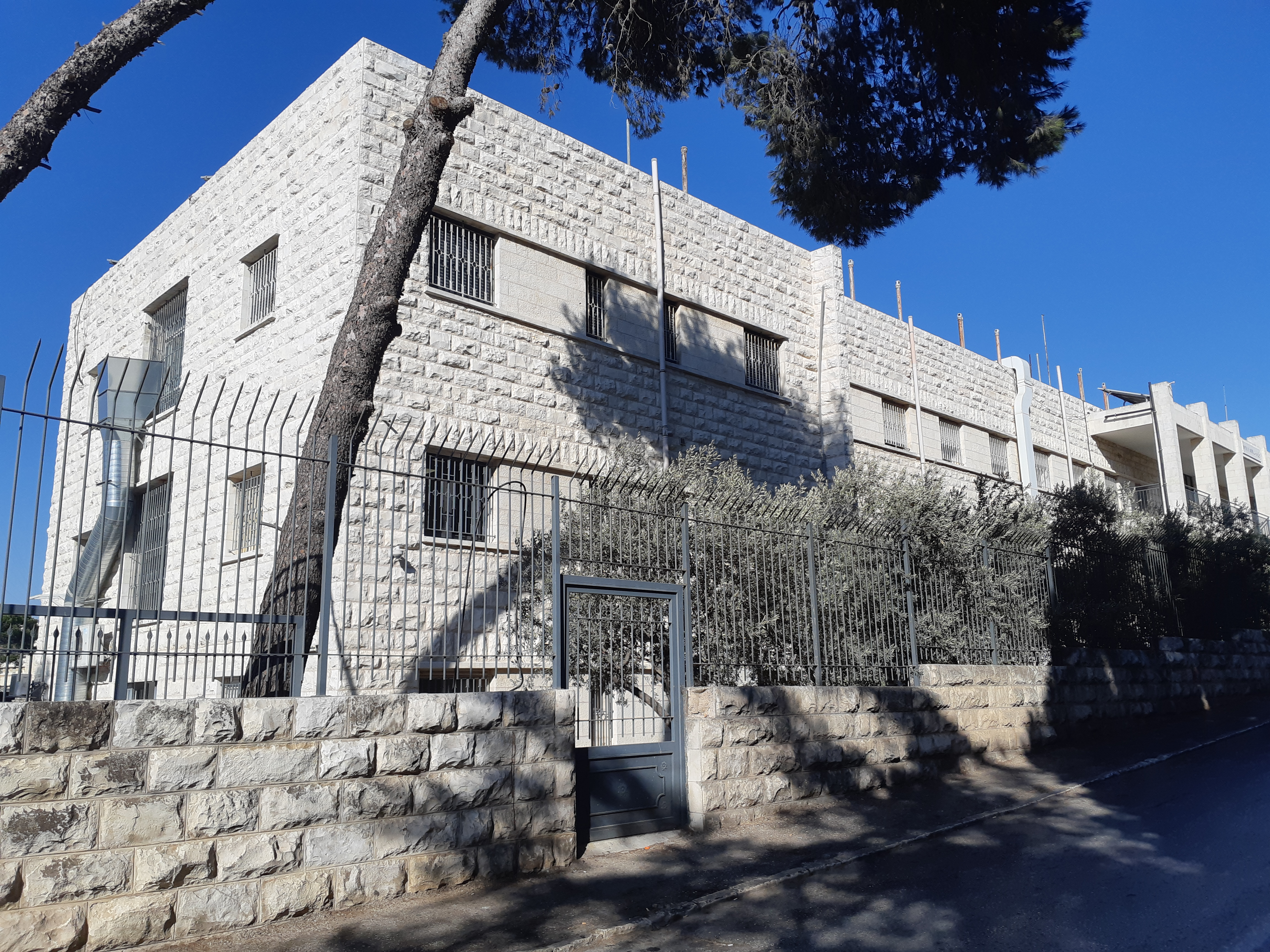
West building in the hospital compound
