= Sisters of St. Joseph of the Apparition =

Religious institute

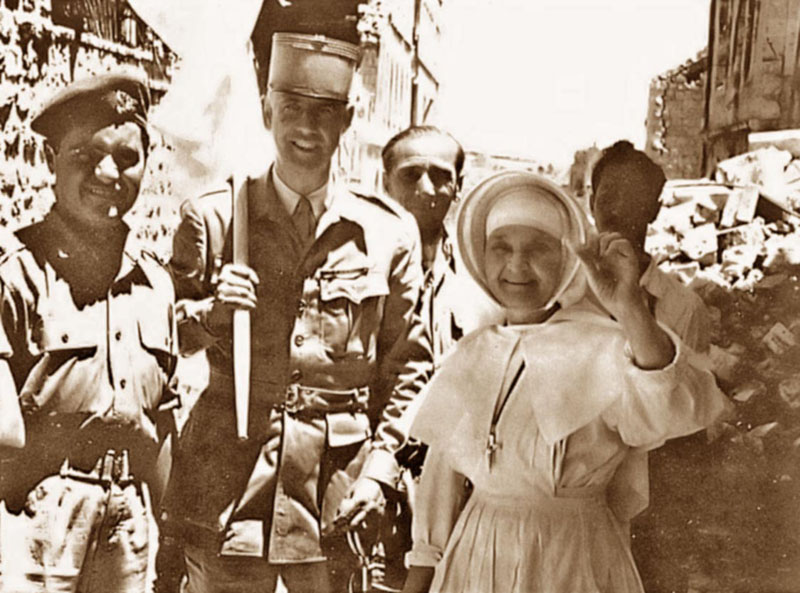
A sister in Jerusalem in 1956

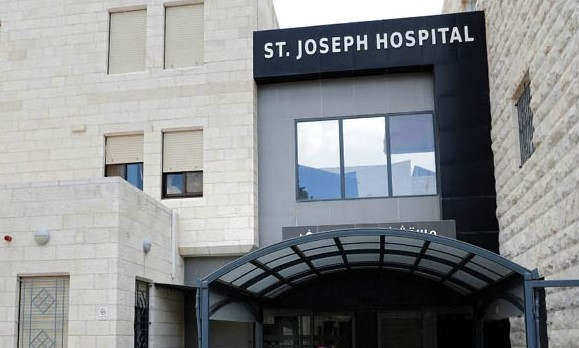
The St. Joseph Hospital in East Jerusalem, which was founded by the order

The Sisters of Saint Joseph of the Apparition (French: Sœurs de Saint-Joseph-de-l'Apparition; Latin: Institutum Sororum a S. Joseph ab Apparitione; abbreviation: S.J.A.) is a Catholic religious institute of pontifical right whose members profess public vows of chastity, poverty, and obedience and follow the evangelical way of life in common.

== Founding ==
Emily de Vialar was born into an aristocratic family in Gaillac, France, on 12 September 1797. As the Sisters of Charity of Nevers cared for the sick poor and abandoned infants at their hospital, Emily decided to direct her attention to the education of poor children and she opened a school. A few young girls of Gaillac rallied round her, and on Christmas night 1832 she founded a Congregation, soon known as Sisters of St. Joseph of the Apparition. The name of the congregation reflects the apparition recounted in Matthew 1:21 in which an angel advises Joseph not to be afraid to take Mary as his wife.

In 1835 the Sisters were called to Algeria, then in 1840 to Tunisia and other countries round the Mediterranean. In 1842 Emily de Vialar was on her way to Algiers when she was shipwrecked at Malta. Taking this as a sign, she opened a school at Vittoriosa.

By the time of Emilie's death, in Marseilles on 24 August 1856, her sisters were active in twelve countries. The sisters first arrived in the Holy Land at an invitation of the Franciscans in 1848. They were entrusted with the educational mission in the Holy Land schools, which they continue to carry out in Jerusalem, Jaffa, and St. Joseph School in Bethlehem. In 1855 four sisters from France arrived, after a four-month voyage, in Fremantle, Australia, and set up schools there and in Albany and Northam.

The Congregation is open to every form of apostolate which charity inspires: missionary work, pastoral ministry, education of youth, care of the sick and aged. In England, the sisters operate Our Lady of the Vale nursing home in Cheshire.

The Generalate of the Congregation can be found in Paris, France. The sisters have houses in Africa, Asia, Europe and Latin America. As of 2024 there are sisters in 130 communities in 28 countries.
