= Feride Acar =

Turkish sociologist and women's rights activist

- Born: Ayşe Feride Acar; 14 January 1948 (age 78); Bursa, Turkey
- Education: Middle East Technical University (BA); Bryn Mawr College (MA, PhD)
- Occupations: Academic; women's rights activist
- Spouse: Ahmet Acar
- Awards: Council of Europe Pro Merito Medal

Feride Acar (born 1948) is a Turkish international expert on women and gender. She was the founding chair of the Middle East Technical University's gender and women's studies program. Between 2003 and 2005 served as chair of the Committee on the Elimination of Discrimination against Women and served three consecutive terms as president of the Council of Europe's Group of Experts of Action against Violence against Women and Domestic Violence (GREVIO). In 2019, she was awarded the Pro Merito Medal of the Council of Europe for her service to that body in advancing women's rights.

== Early life and education ==
Ayşe Feride Acar was born on 14 January 1948 in Bursa, Turkey. She earned a bachelor's degree in sociology at the Middle East Technical University in Ankara in 1970. She furthered her education in the United States, earning a master's degree in 1973 and a PhD in 1976, from Bryn Mawr College in political sociology.

== Career ==
=== Academics ===
After completing her studies, Acar returned to Turkey and was hired as an associate professor in the Department of Public Administration at the Middle East Technical University (METU), teaching sociology. She was the founding chair of the Gender and Women's Studies Graduate Program at METU and served as its head from 1994 to 2004. Simultaneously, she served as chair of the Department of Political Science and Public Administration from 2001 to 2007. She retired in 2015.

=== Activism ===
From the 1980s, Acar was active in the women's rights movement. She attended the 1995 Beijing Conference on women and was elected to the Committee on the Elimination of Discrimination against Women (CEDAW Committee) in 1997. She served on the CEDAW Committee through 2005, acting as its rapporteur between 1999 and 2001, vice president from 2001 to 2003, and president between 2003 and 2005. She returned to the CEDAW Committee in 2011 and served until 2019. She assisted in the development of the Istanbul Convention from 2006 to 2011 and when its monitoring organ went into force, she served as a member. She was the Turkish Representative of the first monitoring Ad Hoc Committee (CAHVIO) from 2009 to 2010, and from 2015, the Group of Experts of Action against Violence against Women and Domestic Violence (GREVIO). Acar was elected for three consecutive terms as president of GREVIO, completing her service in 2019.

== Awards and honors ==
In 2010, she was the honoree of the Parliamentarians for Global Action's Defender of Democracy Award. In 2018, she was honored for her record in human rights by the Canadian government and that same year was honored by the Turkish Association of University Women for her activism. In 2019, Acar was awarded the Pro Merito Medal of the Council of Europe for her service in advancing women's rights. In 2018, she was included in the list of the top 100 people fighting gender discrimination in the world with her fight for equality, prepared by the non-governmental organization Apolitical.

== Research and selected works ==
The focus of Acar's research has typically been gender equality and women's rights. She has written on women in academia and education, in socio-political movements, and with regard to international human rights standards. Among her works are:

- Acar, Feride (1983). "Turkish Women in Academia: Roles and Careers". METU Studies in Development. 10 (4). Ankara: Middle East Technical University: 409–446. ISSN 1010-9935.
- Acar, Feride; Dizier, Anne (1991). Conditions of Turkish Women and the Appeal of Conservative Religious Ideologies. Ankara: Middle East Technical University. OCLC 320872224.
- Acar, Feride (1991). "Women in the Ideology of Islamic Revivalism in Turkey: Three Islamic Women's Journals". In Tapper, Richard (ed.). Islam in Modern Turkey: Religion, Politics, and Literature in a Secular State. London: Palgrave Macmillan. pp. 280–303. ISBN 978-1-85043-321-7. OCLC 936943743.
- Acar, Feride; Güneş-Ayata, Ayşe; Varoğlu, Demet (1999). Cinsiyete dayalı ayrımcılık: Türkiye'de eğitim sektörü örneği; cinsiyete dayalı ayrımcılık ve kadın çalışanlara karşı tutumlar [Discrimination Based on Gender: Education Sector Example in Turkey; Gender-Based Discrimination and Attitudes Towards Female Employees] (in Turkish). Ankara: T.C. Başbakanlık Kadının Statüsü ve Sorunları Genel Müdürlüğü. ISBN 978-975-19-2328-8.
- Acar, Feride; Günes-Ayate, Ayşe, eds. (2000). Gender and Identity Construction: Women of Central Asia, the Caucasus and Turkey. Leiden: Brill Publishers. ISBN 978-90-04-49202-8.
- Acar, Feride; Ariner, Hakki Onur (2009). Women's Human Rights and Gender Equality. Ankara: Ministry of Interior in Turkey. ISBN 978-605-378-094-6.
- Acar, Feride; Altunok, Gülbanu (2012). "Understanding Gender Equality Demands in Turkey: Foundations and Boundaries of Women's Movements". In Dedeoglu, Saniye; Elveren, Adem Y. (eds.). Gender and Society in Turkey: The Impact of Neoliberal Policies, Political Islam and EU Accession. London: I.B. Tauris. pp. 31–46. ISBN 978-0-7556-0747-1.
