= Tunay Açar =

Turkish footballer (born 1989)

Personal information
- Date of birth: 30 April 1989 (age 37)
- Place of birth: Wiesbaden, West Germany
- Height: 1.75 m (5 ft 9 in)
- Position: Full-back

Youth career
- 1. FSV Schierstein 08
- –2005: FV Biebrich
- 2005–2007: Wehen Wiesbaden

Senior career*
Years	Team	Apps	(Gls)
2007–2010	Wehen Wiesbaden II	43	(0)
2009–2010	Wehen Wiesbaden	5	(1)
2010	Eskişehirspor	0	(0)
2010–2011	Darmstadt 98	16	(0)
2011–2014	Bursaspor	0	(0)
2011–2012	→ Adana Demirspor (loan)	30	(1)
2012–2013	→ Turgutluspor (loan)	20	(0)
2014–2016	Fethiyespor	45	(0)
2016–2018	Sivas Belediye Spor	63	(2)
2018–2019	Pendikspor	20	(0)
2019–2020	FV Biebrich		
2020–2021	SV Zeilsheim	7	(0)

International career
2008	Turkey U20	2	(0)
2009	Turkey U21	4	(0)
- * Club domestic league appearances and goals

Tunay Açar (born 30 April 1989) is a Turkish former professional footballer who played as a full-back.
