= İsmail Acar =

Turkish painter

İsmail Acar (born 1971) is a leading Turkish painter. He graduated with honors in 1991 from the Fine Arts School of Marmara University. In 1993, Acar received his Master of Arts degree in "Technology and Art", as well as in "Postmodernism".

In 2004, Acar was awarded "The Most Successful Artist of Turkey". His paintings have been exhibited in over sixty solo and well over forty joint exhibitions as of 2006. He often applies contemporary media techniques, including computer technology, to traditional painting techniques. The artist has created works on themes such as history, particularly that of Istanbul, and the meeting of Western ideas with Eastern spirituality.
