= ACAR Ground Surveillance Radar =

Turkish radar

ACAR is a surveillance radar, designed and manufactured byAselsan A.Ş, a Turkish corporation that produces electronic systems for the Turkish Armed Forces.

Its main role is ground surveillance and artillery fire adjustment.

== Features ==
ACAR detects, tracks and classifies moving targets. It is also used for artillery fire adjustment, providing feedback on the fall of shot with respect to the intended target. It can be operated as a stand-alone system, or can be integrated onto vehicles, elevated masts or towers. It can be integrated with command & control systems

== Operators ==
- Argentina
- Ghana - Integrated on the Otokar Cobra platform.
- Turkey
- Uruguay- In October 2013, a deal was signed between Aselsan and the Uruguayan Army. As part of the Uruguay border monitoring system project (UBOMS), the ACAR radar and related electro-optical systems have been mounted on telescopic masts on numerous Uruguayan Army Land Rovers
