= Acarlar =

Acarlar may refer to the following places in Turkey:

- Acarlar, Amasra, a village in the district of Amasra, Bartın Province
- Acarlar, İncirliova, a town in the district of İncirliova, Aydın Province
- Acarlar floodplain forest, Turkey
