= Lameece Issaq =

Lameece Issaq is an American writer, actor, and producer.

== Work ==
Lameece Issaq is one of the co-founders of Noor Theatre in New York City (2010).

As an actress, she has performed in many productions including Naomi Wallace's The Fever Chart (directed by Jo Bonney), David Hare's Stuff Happens (Drama Desk Award, Outstanding Ensemble; directed by Daniel Sullivan) at the Public Theatre, Betty Shamieh's The Black Eyed at New York Theatre Workshop (directed by Sam Gold), and Heather Raffo's Noura (directed by Johanna McKeon) at The Old Globe, among several others.

Issaq has also narrated over 70 audiobooks.

=== Plays ===
- Food and Fadwa (with Jacob Kader)
- A Good Day to Me Not to You

=== Film ===
- Abe (with Jacob Kader)
