= Melis Aker =

Turkish playwright, screenwriter, actor, and musician

- Born: San Francisco
- Education: Tufts University, Columbia University
- Occupations: Playwright, screenwriter, actor, musician

Melis Aker is a Turkish playwright, screenwriter, actor, and musician. Her work has been developed or presented by institutions including the Sundance Institute, Signature Theatre Company, The Old Vic, Williamstown Theatre Festival, and the Atlantic Theater Company.

== Early life and education ==
Aker received a bachelor's degree in Dramatic Literature and Philosophy from Tufts University in 2013. She completed an MFA in Playwriting from Columbia University in 2018, studying under David Henry Hwang and Lynn Nottage. She also trained as an actor at the Royal Academy of Dramatic Art and is pursuing a PhD in Creative Writing at King's College London.

== Career ==
Aker was selected for the New York Theatre Workshop's 2050 Fellowship, Ars Nova's Play Group, and the Dramatists Guild Foundation Fellowship. In 2019, her screenplay Arı [Bee] was selected for the Maison des Scénaristes marketplace at the Cannes Film Festival.

Her play Field, Awakening was included on the 2019 Kilroys List. Set on the night of the 2016 attempted coup in Turkey, it follows childhood friends reuniting on an Istanbul football field amid political unrest. The play was featured in HowlRound's panel on Middle Eastern playwrights including Sanaz Toossi and Mona Mansour. Her short play Scraps and Things was commissioned by the Atlantic Theater Company for its Middle Eastern MixFest. It was later featured on the Playing On Air podcast starring Carol Kane, where she co-starred and composed the music. The episode was highlighted by The New York Times, with critic Maya Phillips writing: "when the play took a surprising turn... I turned off the vacuum and stalled in the hallway, afraid I'd miss a word."

During the COVID-19 lockdown, Aker wrote the teleplay Fractio Panis for The Homebound Project, performed by Brian Cox and Nicole Ansari-Cox. She contributed two monologues to The 24 Hour Plays and served as a panelist alongside Annie Baker and Jesse Eisenberg.

In 2022, Aker was named one of the "Women to Watch" by the Broadway Women's Fund, an initiative recognising emerging female theatre-makers. Her play with music Hound Dog premiered Off-Broadway at Greenwich House Theater, co-produced by Ars Nova and The Play Company. The play received a mixed reception. Elisabeth Vincentelli of The New York Times was critical of the play, writing that it had unfulfilled potential and a lack of focus and bite. The show was listed by Time Out New York among the best Off-Broadway productions of the season. That year, she was announced as the inaugural LaunchPad resident playwright at Signature Theatre Company, where she was commissioned to write the play Fish. The play was featured as part of Signature Theatre's 2023–24 season.

In 2023, Aker received a Jonathan Larson Grant through the American Theatre Wing as co-book writer and co-lyricist of the bilingual musical Azul. That year, she also joined the 503Five residency at Theatre503 in London, where she developed her play Murmurs under commission.

In 2024, her short film Baba in Graceland was produced with support from the Sundance Institute interdisciplinary grant. That same year, her play Indigo Dreams was presented as part of the Fridays@3 reading series at the Williamstown Theatre Festival.

In 2025, Aker served as the book writer for the musical stage adaptation of Hundred Feet Tall, based on the children's book by Benjamin Scheuer and Jemima Williams. The production was staged by The Old Vic and toured public libraries and children's hospitals across London.

== Acting and music ==
Aker appeared in the world premiere of Love in Afghanistan by Charles Randolph-Wright at Arena Stage. She has also appeared in television series including The Equalizer and The Blacklist: Redemption.

As a singer-songwriter, Aker has released multiple albums and EPs, including Dirt, The Other Side, and the seasonal Sessions series on Spotify.

== Academic work ==
Aker has taught playwriting and screenwriting at The New School and prose fiction at King's College London.

== Works ==
=== Plays ===
- Field, Awakening
- Fish
- Indigo Dreams
- Hound Dog
- Murmurs

=== Screenwriting and film ===
- Arı [Bee]
- Baba in Graceland
- Fractio Panis (teleplay)

=== Musicals ===
- Azul (co-book writer, co-lyricist)
- Hundred Feet Tall (book writer)

=== Music releases ===
- Dirt [EP] (2015)
- The Little Prince (2015)
- The Other Side [LP] (2016)
- Fall Sessions [EP] (2021)
- Winter Sessions [EP] (2022)
- Spring Sessions [EP] (2022)
- Summer Sessions [EP] (2022)
