= Mona Mansour =

American playwright

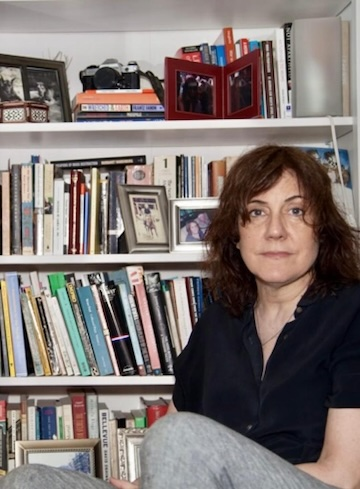
Writer Mona Mansour in Brooklyn, NY

Mona Mansour is an American playwright of Middle Eastern descent. She has been a member of the Public Theater's Emerging Writers Group and a Playwrights' Center Core Writer. She was a resident playwright at New Dramatists. Mansour often writes about the Middle East, and she has frequently collaborated with English director Mark Wing-Davey. In addition to her theater work, Mansour has written for the television shows Queens Supreme, Dead Like Me, and New Amsterdam.

== Produced works ==
- Urge for Going - Public Theater (New York, 2011) (Public LAB production)
- The Hour of Feeling - Humana Festival at Actors Theatre of Louisville (2012)
- The Way West - Steppenwolf Theatre (Chicago, 2014); Marin Theatre Company (San Francisco, 2015); LAByrinth Theater Company (New York, 2016)
- Unseen ( Oregon Shakespeare Festival, 2022; Mosaic Theater, 2023)
- Beginning Days of True Jubilation (with SOCIETY Theater, 2022)
- The Vagrant Trilogy (Public Theater, 2022)

== Awards and honors ==
- 2012 Whiting Award
- 2013 Sky Cooper New American Play Prize for The Way West
- 2014 Middle East America Playwright Award
- 2020 Helen Merrill Award
- 2020 Kesselring Award
- 2023 Arts and Letters Award in Literature
- 2023 Steinberg Award
