= Saint John Eye Hospital Group =

Organization based in Jerusalem

Coordinates: 31°46′39″N 35°13′47″E

The St John of Jerusalem Eye Hospital Group is a charitable foundation which operates an ophthalmic hospital in Jerusalem – one of six hospitals in the East Jerusalem Hospitals Network – and satellite eye care clinics and hospitals in the West Bank and Gaza Strip. It is a wholly owned corporate subsidiary of the Venerable Order of St John. The Hospital Group is based in Jerusalem and is the main provider of eye care in the Palestinian territories.

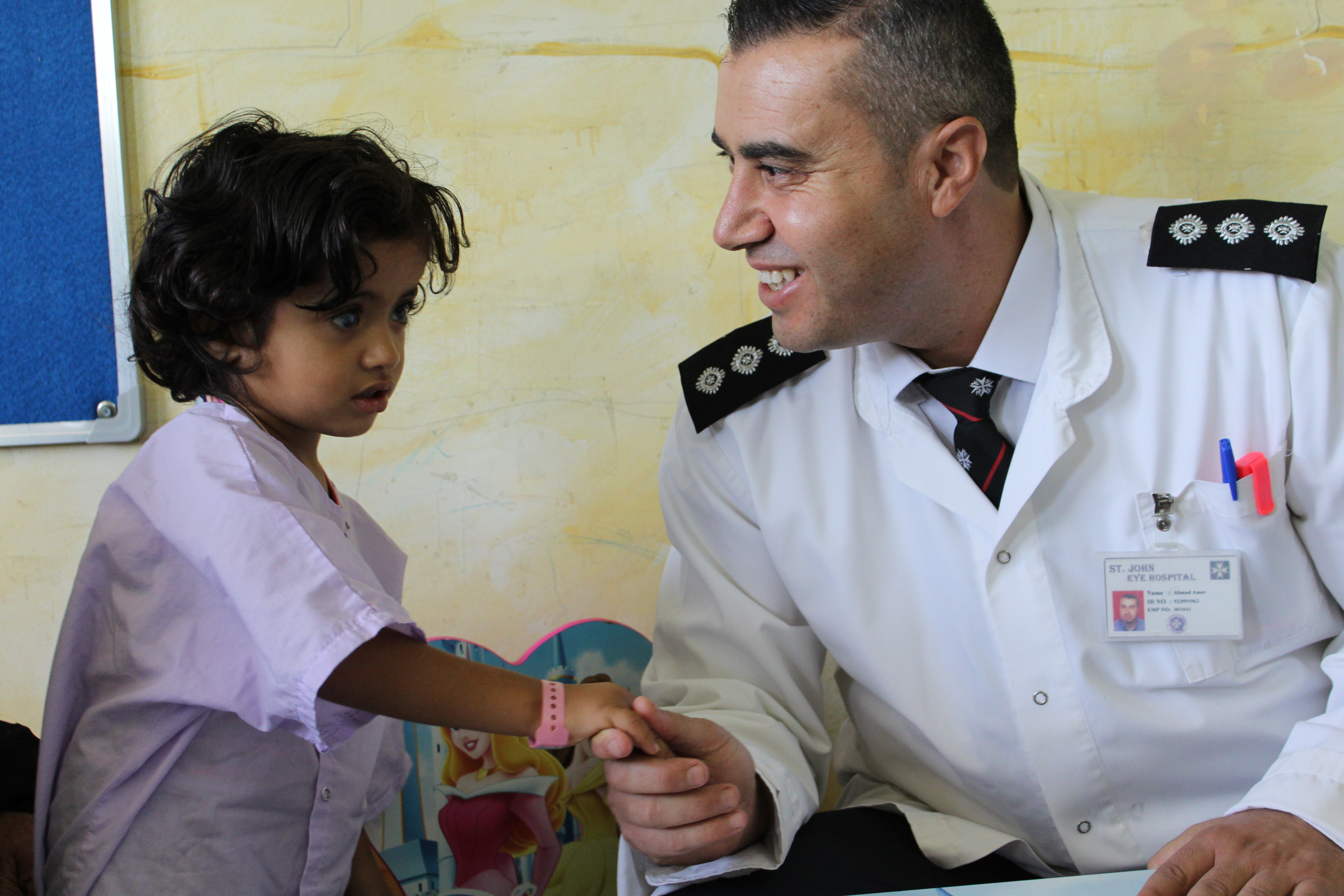
St John nurse with Gazan glaucoma patient.

== History ==
=== First site ===
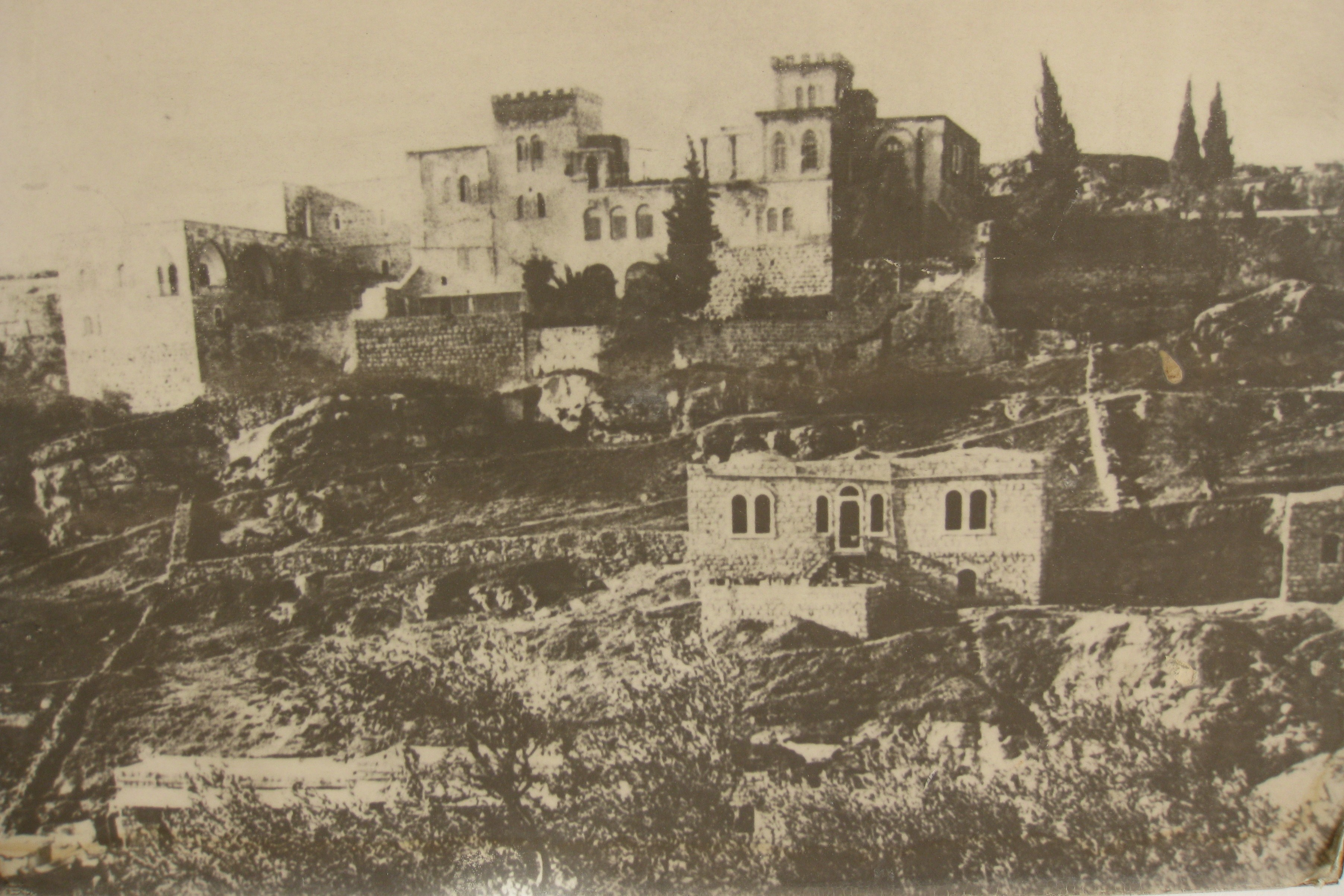
The hospital building with its two towers in its early years (c. 1890s)

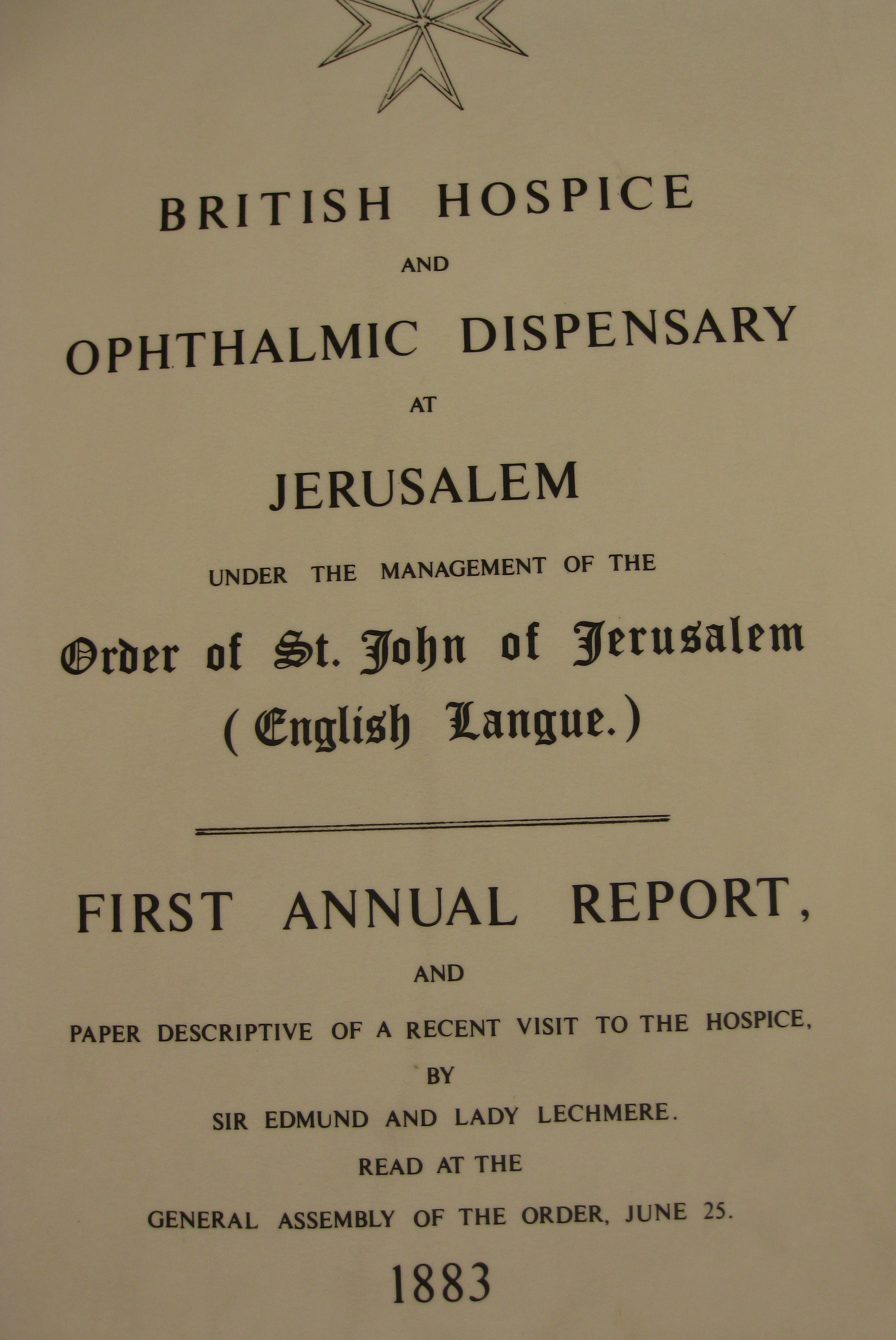
The hospital's first annual report 1883

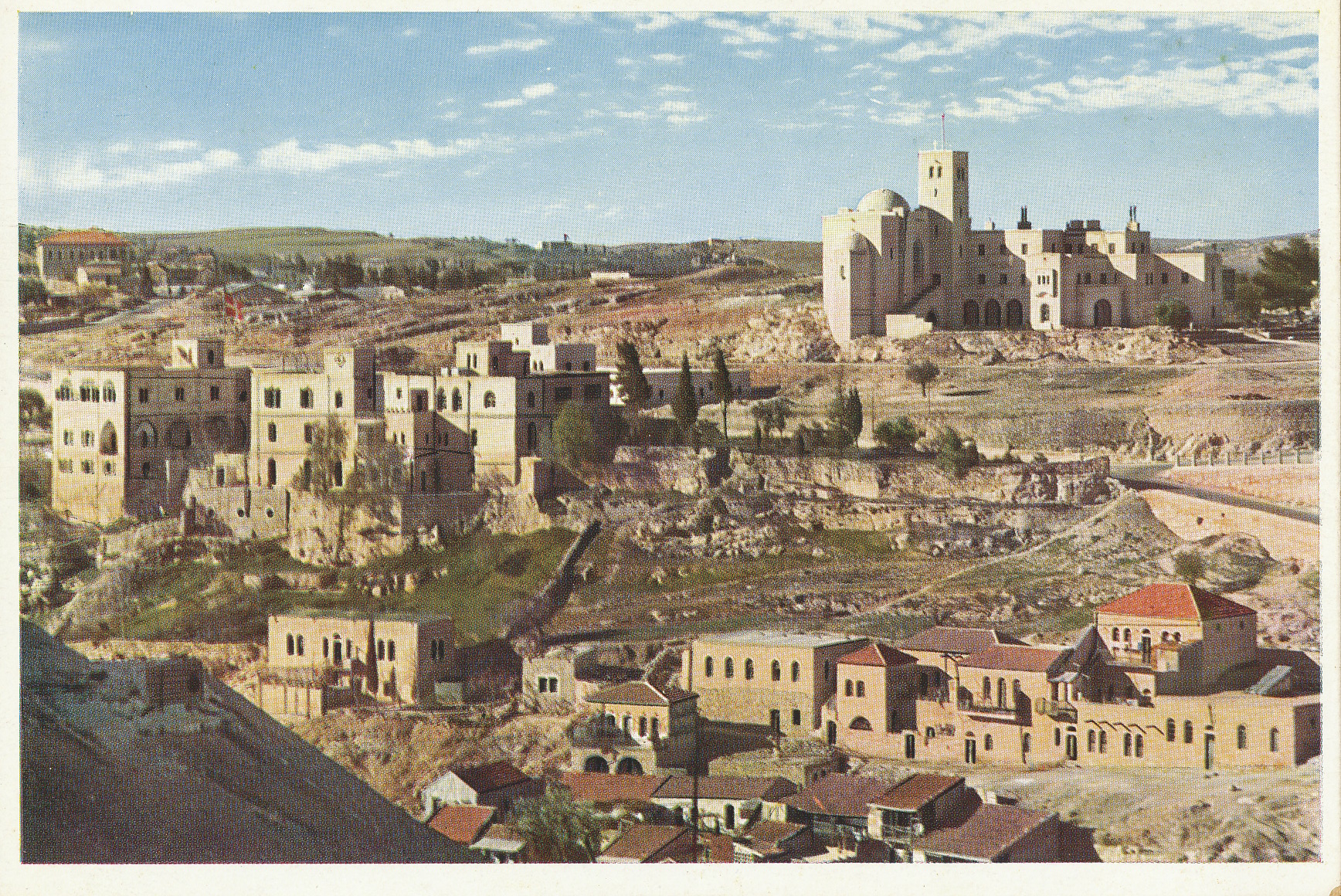
Panoramic view of the hospital (left) and St Andrew's Church (top right) in 1930

The original hospital opened by the Order of St John in 1882 on the Bethlehem Road just south of the old city of Jerusalem. Queen Victoria granted the hospital a Royal Charter. Sir Edmund Lechmere, 3rd Baronet was one of the key figures in the establishment of the hospital. Lechmere and his wife were among the founders of Venerable Order of St John and had travelled several times to Jerusalem where they witnessed the need of its residents for eye care.

During the First World War, the hospital was closed and its building was taken over by the Turkish Army, who used it to store ammunition. During the Battle of Jerusalem in 1917, the building was damaged. Following the establish of the British Mandate for Palestine, the architect Clifford Holliday was hired to renovate the building. Holliday also designed a new wing and the nearby St Andrew's Church, which were both opened in 1930. The new wing was situated across the street, on the opposite side of Hebron Road. In the 1960s, after the hospital moved to its current location, the Clifford Holliday wing became an arts and crafts center, henceforth known as the Jerusalem House of Quality.

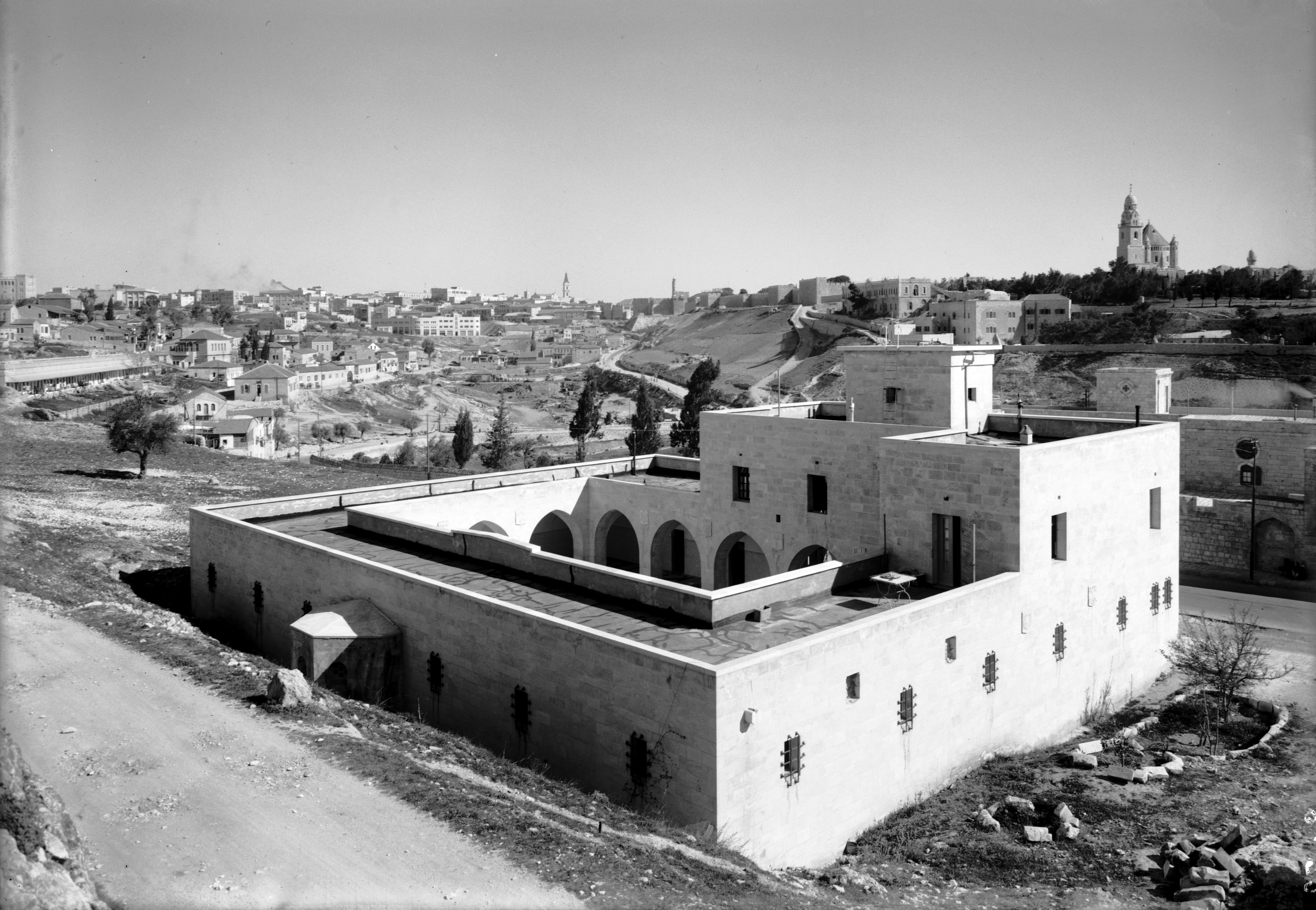
New wing seen from St Andrew's Church (1934–39)

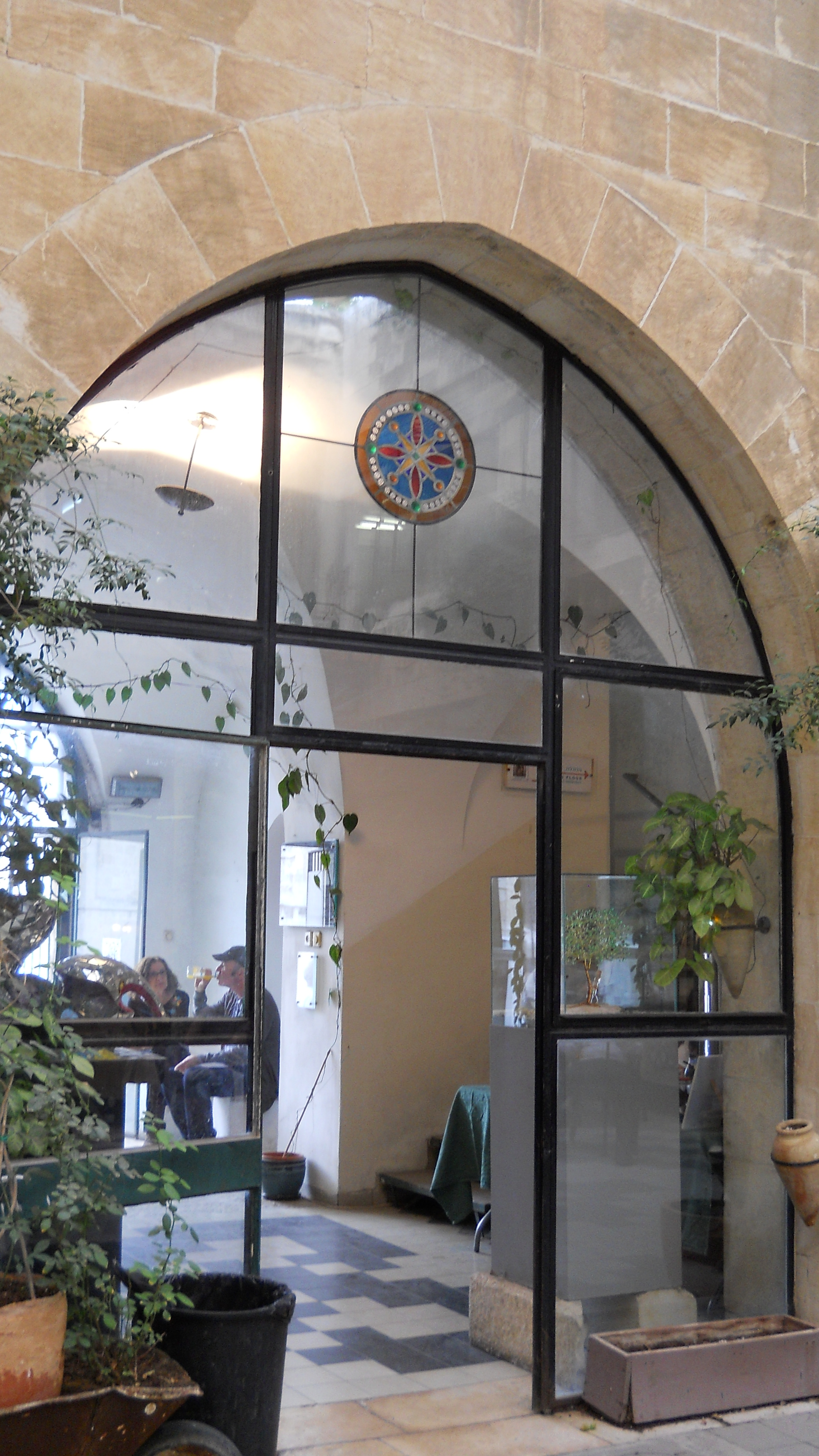
Clifford Holliday's new wing, today's Jerusalem House of Quality

In the 1970s, the original hospital building was sold to a developer who wanted to demolish it and build a hotel in its place. Following a campaign by the Society for the Protection of Nature in Israel, the developer was barred from demolishing the building; instead he was permitted to build an extension to it, in keeping with the original style of the building, and to renovate and preserve the original structure. The hotel was opened in the 1980s and was named the Mt. Zion Hotel.

=== Second site ===
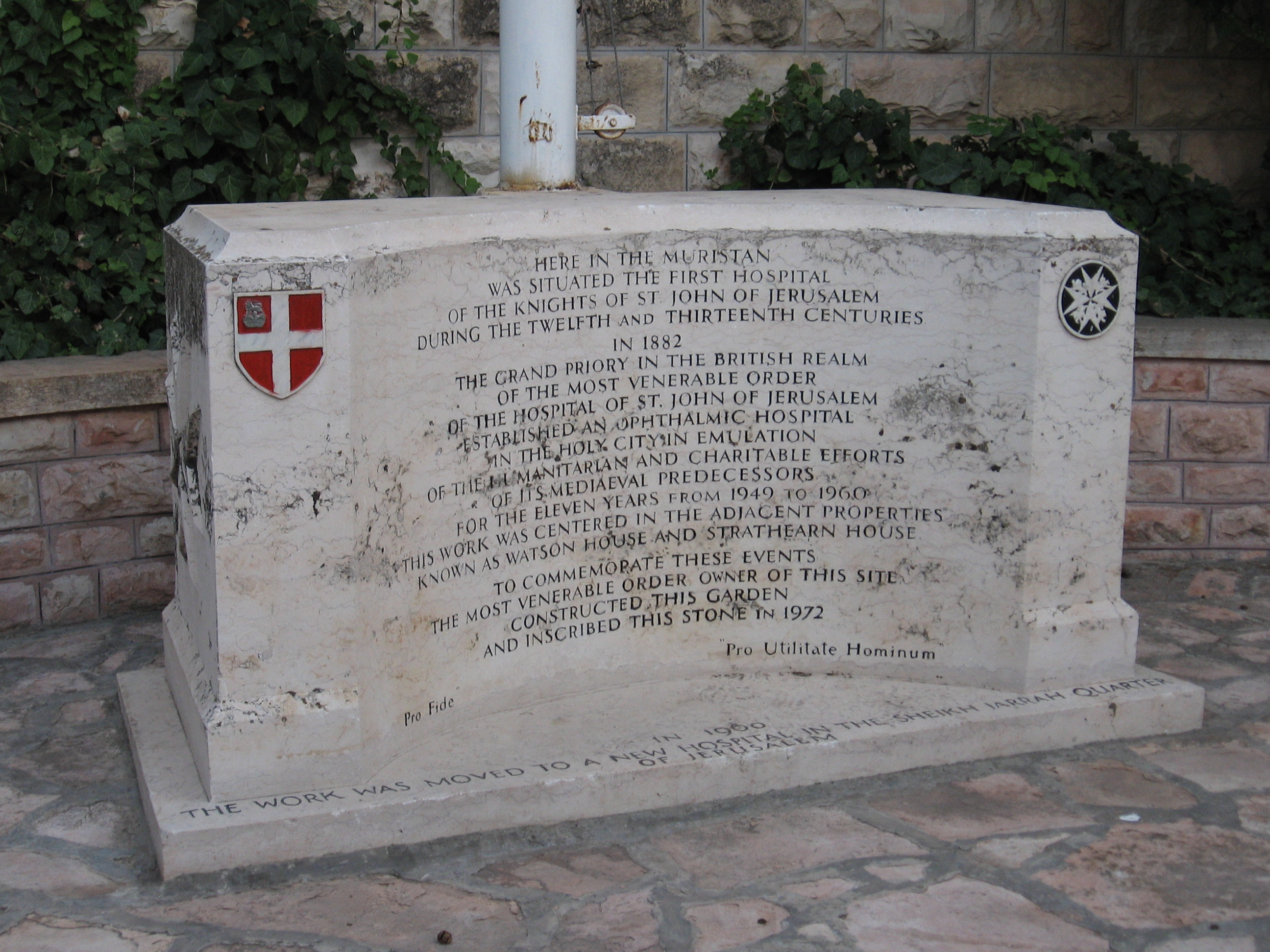
Memorial in Muristan Street, Old City, marking the location of the medieval hospital, as well as the second site of the modern hospital (1949–1960)

Following the 1949 Armistice Agreements between Israel and Jordan, the valley just below the hospital building and Mount Zion, which had been on the front line at the time of the armistice, were designated as no-man's land. The hospital could not operate at this location anymore. Additionally, what had now become Jordan-ruled East Jerusalem was cut off from the building.

Between 1949 and 1960 the hospital operated from two buildings, the Watson House and the Strathearn House, owned by the Order in Muristan Street in the Old City of Jerusalem (see monument inscription in the photo).

=== Third site ===
The hospital's present building was opened in 1960 at Nashashibi Street in the Sheikh Jarrah neighbourhood of East Jerusalem.

== Current Jerusalem hospital ==
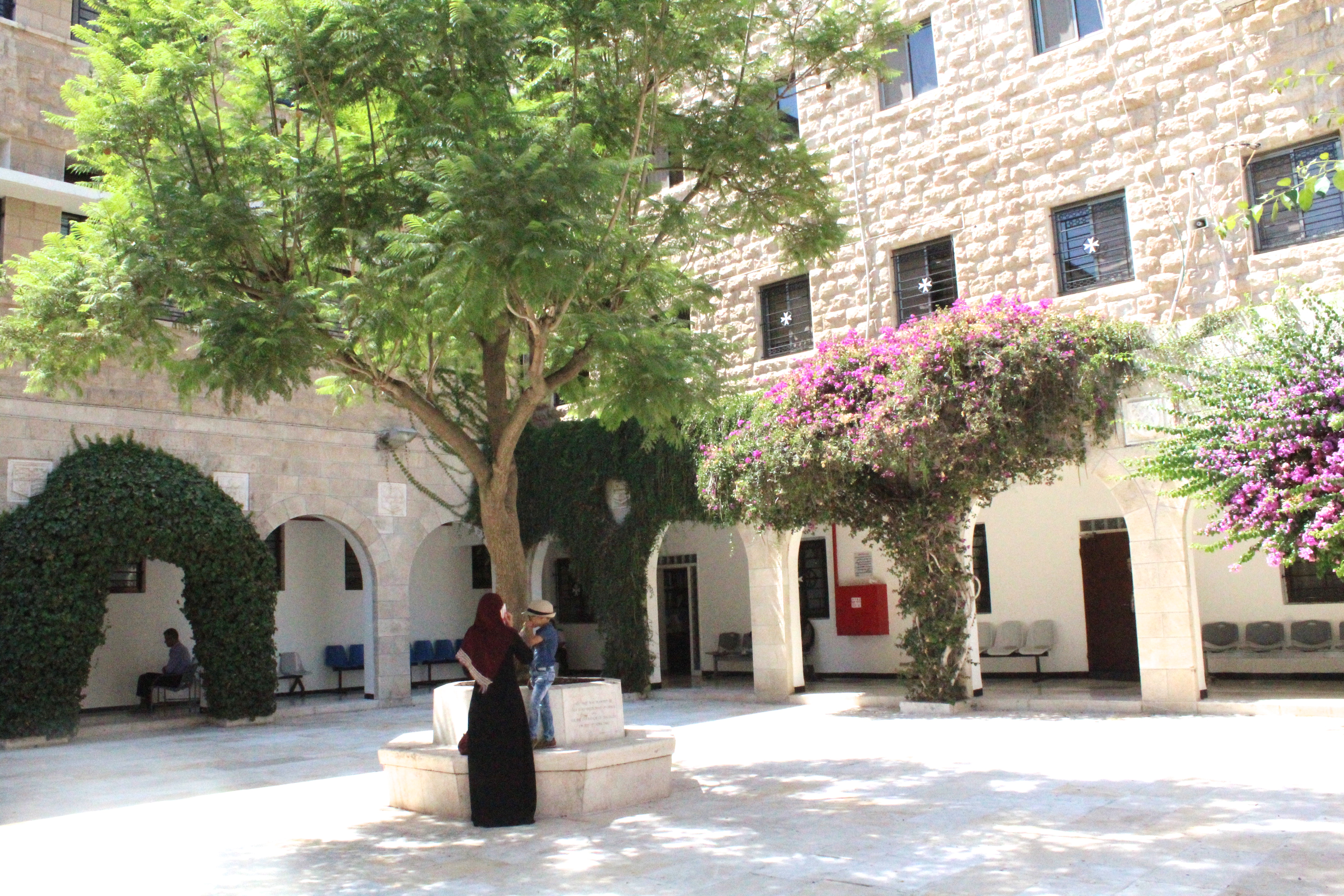
St John of Jerusalem Eye Hospital Group's Jerusalem Hospital at Sheik Jarrah

The main Jerusalem hospital is an ISO and Joint Commission International accredited, general eye hospital. It has a 49-bed capacity and is staffed by both foreign and local specialist surgeons, doctors, paramedics, overseas medical volunteers and nurses. There is a large Outpatients Department and specialist retinal, corneal and pediatric services. The hospital also has a research unit.

The hospital attracts a substantial number of volunteer doctors from around the world who not only help care for the patients but also help in the teaching and training of the local doctors.

== Satellite centres & mobile outreach ==
=== Hebron hospital ===
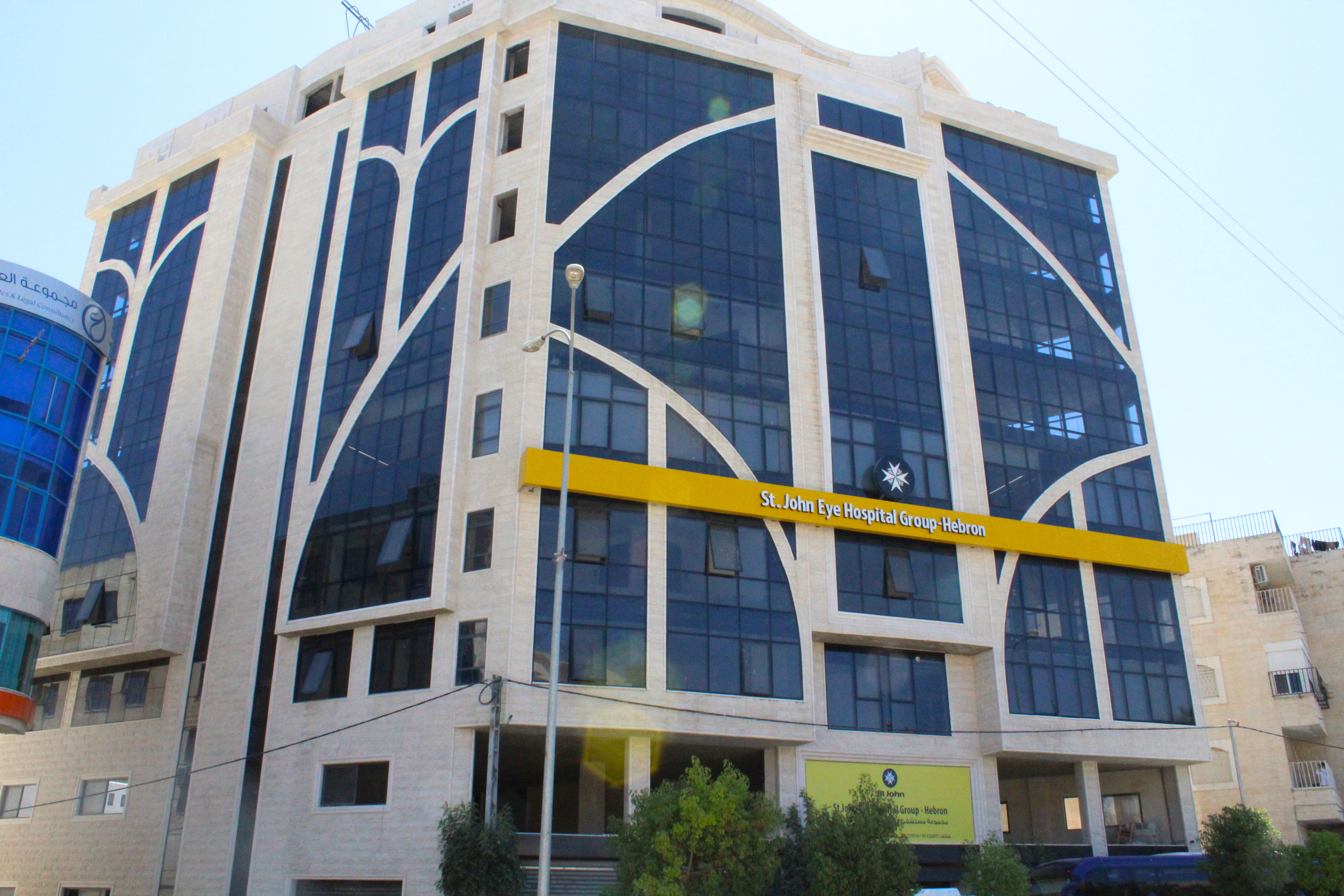
The St John Hebron Hospital opened in November 2015

In 2005 SJEHG set up a hospital in Hebron. The hospital provides cataract and laser eye surgery to treat diabetic retinopathy, and serves the 640,000 people that live in and around Hebron, including the semi-nomadic Bedouins of the Negev Desert. In November 2015 SJEHG moved into a new hospital building in Hebron. In 2016 the hospital treated over 13,600 patients including performing over 500 major operations.

=== Anabta clinic ===
In 2007, SJEHG set up its clinic in Anabta. The St John Anabta Clinic treats over 20,000 patients every year. It is easily accessible from the major areas of Nablus, Tulkarem and Jenin.

=== Gaza hospital ===
St John Gaza Hospital has been providing charitable eye care for the 1.8 million residents of Gaza since 1992. In 2008 the hospital saw just over 16,000 patients and performed no major operations. In 2016, saw over 27,000 outpatients and performed over 500 major operations.

=== Mobile Outreach Programmes ===
The Mobile Outreach Programme was launched in 1980. It has two teams which travel across the West Bank every week. One Mobile Outreach team typically sees between 8,000 and 10,000 Palestinians each year. The Mobile Outreach Programme launched for the first time in Gaza in 2017.

== See also ==
- List of hospitals in the State of Palestine
