= Healthcare in Palestine =

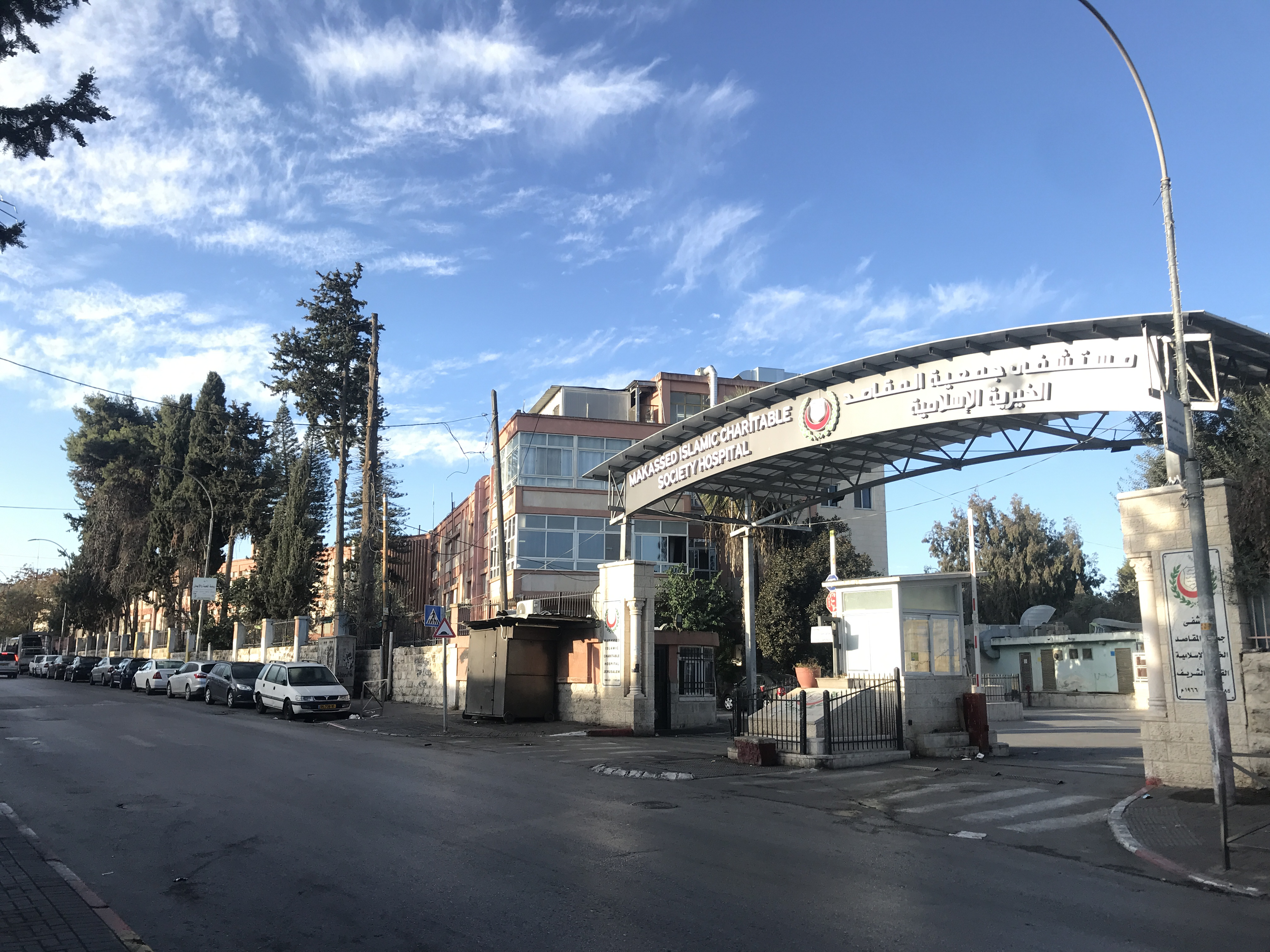

Healthcare in the State of Palestine refers to the governmental and private healthcare providers to which residents in the claimed territory have access. Since 1967, there have been improvements in access to healthcare and the overall general health conditions for residents. Advances in training, increased access to state-of-the-art medical technology, and various governmental provisions have enabled per-capita funding to increase, thereby enhancing the overall health of residents in the region. Additionally, enhanced access to and funding from international organizations, such as the World Health Organization, the United Nations, the Palestinian Ministry of Health, and the World Bank's Education and Health Rehabilitation Project, have contributed to the current state of affairs within the healthcare sector of Palestine.

However, while many efforts to advance the state of health affairs within Palestine have shown improvement, there is still progress not yet made. Continued efforts to recognize and address the geopolitical barriers will be necessary to continue to have significant success in this field. Addressing demographic trends within the region, like differing pregnancy rates and mortality rates, will be necessary to enhance the state of health affairs that Palestine faces.

The Human Rights Measurement Initiative (HRMI) uses income-adjusted benchmarks to assign Palestine an overall quality of life rating of 91.4%, based on the fulfillment of core economic and social rights within Palestine. These include education rights at 78.4%, food access at 95.4%, health quality at 84.2%, housing at 99.0%, and work at 100%, respectively. The HRMI health quality scores break up into Child health, ranked at 99.4%, Adult health, ranked at 95.4%, and reproductive health, ranked at 57.7%. HRMI finds Palestine overall has "some way to go" to reach international standards. Additionally, when compared with other countries in South-East Asia, Palestine found to perform "lower than average".

== History ==
=== Oslo Accords and the establishment of the PNA ===
Between 1993 and 1995, the State of Israel and the Palestine Liberation Organization (PLO) reached a series of pacts collectively known as the Oslo Accords. The accords were facilitated by the international community, led by the United States and the Russian Federation. The accords established an autonomous Palestinian National Authority (PNA) that could administer the occupied territories. The accords transferred jurisdiction over Palestinians living in the Gaza Strip and the West Bank from Israel to the PNA, whose charter calls for the creation of a democratically elected Legislative Council that could write laws pertaining to the economic, security, educational, and healthcare needs of Gaza and West Bank Palestinians.

=== Establishment of the PNA's Ministry of Health ===
Since 1967, a division of the Israeli Military known as the Health Department of the Civil Administration (HDCA) has been responsible for overseeing healthcare in the occupied territories. During this time, HDCA's work was greatly supported by three other primary sources of healthcare: Non-governmental organizations, the UN, and the private sector.

Shortly after Oslo I and the corresponding transfer of jurisdiction, the PNA established a Ministry of Health (MOH) to administer healthcare in Gaza and the West Bank.

In 2012, the HDCA set aside 2 million NIS ($500,000 USD) to send Palestinian medical staff to HDCA training. In 2013, the HDCA's roles primarily involved overseeing the transfer of Palestinian patients to hospitals in Israel.

=== De facto secession of Gaza from the PNA ===
Until 2007, PNA healthcare policy was fully exercisable in both the West Bank and the Gaza Strip. However, in the 2007 Battle of Gaza, Hamas militias forcibly expelled all rivals from Gaza, bringing Gaza firmly under Hamas control. Hence, as of 2007, the PNA's control does not extend to Gaza de facto. Despite its lack of de facto control, the PNA still contributes financially to healthcare in Gaza by assisting with the salaries of some healthcare officials and sending medical supplies.

== Legal basis ==
According to the World Bank, the two documents that comprise the legal framework of PNA healthcare are the 2003 Palestinian Constitution and the 2004 Public Health Law. In its articles concerning healthcare, the constitution requires that the PNA regulate health insurance and guarantee healthcare to the following classes of people: the injured, prisoners of war, families of dead resistance fighters, and the disabled. Additionally, the 2004 Public Health Law comprises 13 chapters and 85 provisions covering issues such as women's and children's health, combating disease, environmental health, and public health infrastructure. Notably, the law requires the MOH to offer certain types of health services to Palestinians, including preventative, diagnostic, curative, rehabilitative, and emergency care. In addition to establishing the MOH as the governmental source of healthcare provision, the law assigns the ministry responsibility for regulating the other three healthcare sectors.

== Major sources of healthcare and health expenditure ==
=== Public sector ===
Through its Ministry of Health (MOH), the PNA provides health services to Palestinians under its jurisdiction in accordance with the Constitution and the Public Health Law. Additionally, the PNA government insurance plan is the principal insurance provider in the PNA run territories. Since the ascendancy of the Hamas government in Gaza, the PNA's MOH no longer serves a governmental function in Gaza healthcare, having been replaced by Hamas. The majority of funding for MOH services emanates from foreign aid and taxes. Public sector spending represents about 32% of healthcare expenditure in Palestine.

=== UNRWA sector ===
Since its inception in 1948, the United Nations Relief and Works Agency, (UNRWA) has had jurisdiction over the social services of Palestinian refugees. The organization maintains funding, (determined by the UN) to provide free health services to eligible Palestinians living in the West Bank and in Gaza, provided that they are registered as refugees. As of 2012, the UNRWA provides health services to 727,471 people in the West Bank through some 42 primary health centers and to 1,167,572 Gazans through 21 Primary Health centers. The UNRWA finances about 24% of all healthcare spending in Palestine.

=== NGO sector ===
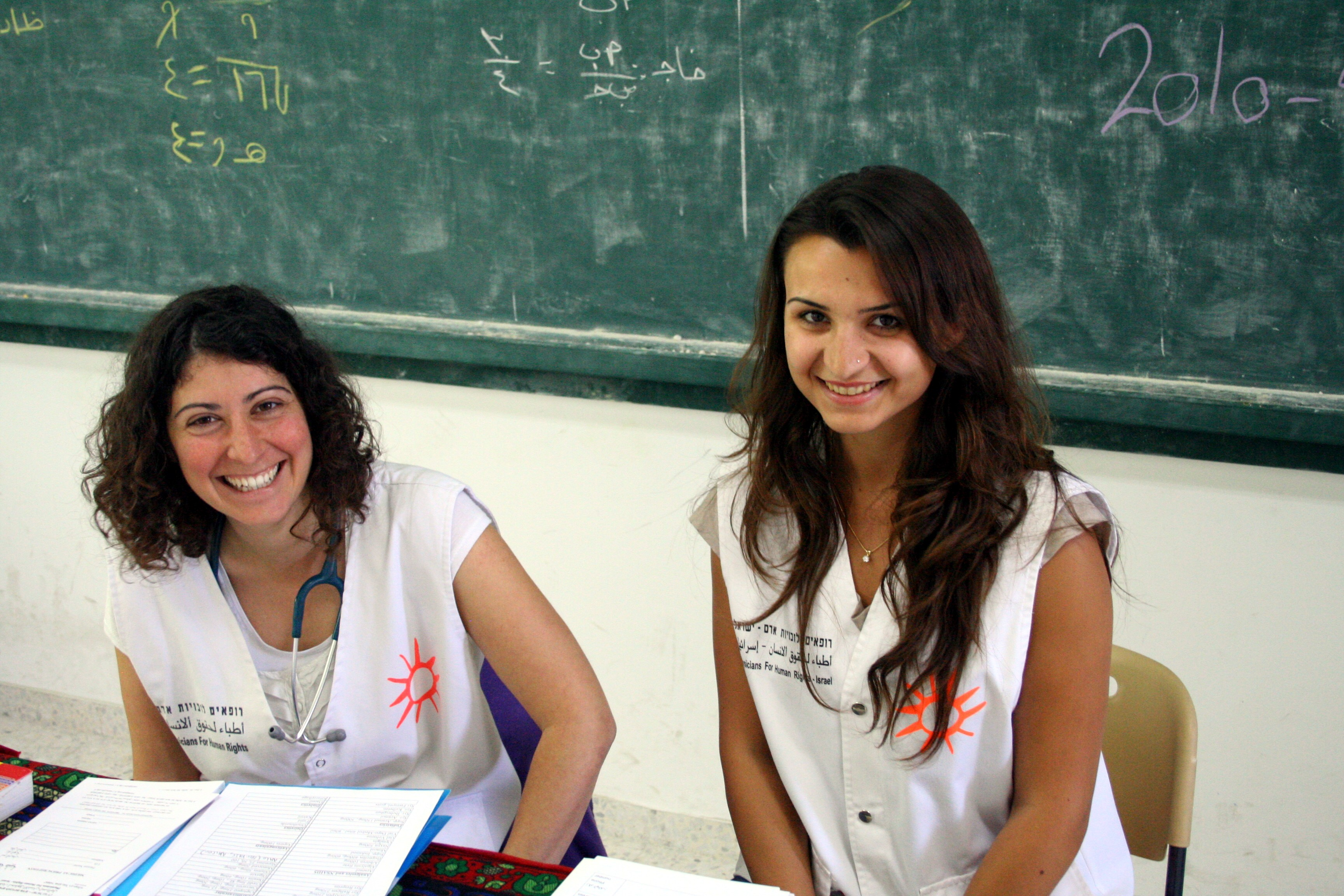
PHR-IL Mobile Clinic Medical day for women In Azbat Jarrad village, near Tul Karem, April 2010

Palestinian Non-Governmental Organizations (NGOs) bankrolled by private benefactors encompass a sizable portion of the healthcare economy in the PNA. A survey conducted by the World Bank found that 11.7% of Palestinians used NGOs most frequently for their health needs. 13.3% of households in the West Bank relied on NGOs compared to 8.1% of households in Gaza. The World Bank report explained that fewer NGOs operate in Gaza than in the West Bank and that Gaza residents are more likely to be classified as refugees and therefore to have access to services provided by UNRWA. Palestinians are most likely to visit NGOs when they require mental health counseling, physical therapy and rehabilitation, and medical training and they are least likely to use NGOs for emergency care, routine check-ups, and maternity and pediatric needs. The Department for International Development, a British government agency, found that a visit to an NGO-run primary health clinic cost twice as much as a visit to a government clinic and four times as much as a visit to a UNRWA facility. In 2004, DFID reported that NGOs employed 33% of workers in the Palestinian health sector, while the Palestinian Central Bureau of Statistics put the figure at 26% in 2005. In 2003, Palestinian NGOs received $54 million from donors, out of about $240 million donated for healthcare in Palestine.

=== Private sector ===
The private healthcare space has grown in recent years with the advent of privately held hospitals, pharmacies, laboratories, and rehabilitation centers. A nascent pharmaceutical industry has also developed, which is able to supply about one half of total Palestinian demand for prescription medicine. Some private health insurance programs have been established, though with limited popularity. Many Palestinians with means self-pay for health services not available to them through other avenues and private expenditure comprises roughly 37% of all spending on healthcare in Gaza and the West Bank.

== Data about the healthcare system ==
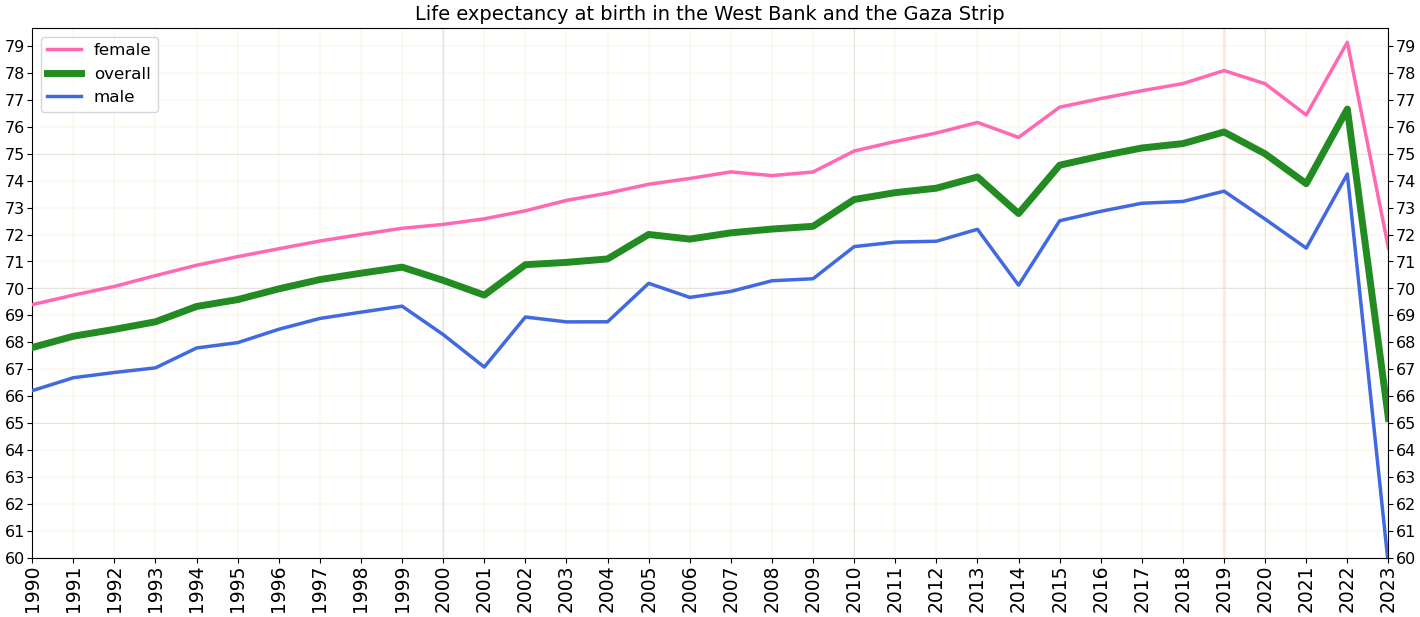
Life expectancy in Palestine

To provide an informative overview of the current state of healthcare within Palestine, some statistical information about the current system will provide greater clarity on the state of affairs. Currently, Palestine has approximately sixty hospitals and medical centers within the region, with numerous other medical research institutes pursuing initiatives on various medical advances including issues like cancer and Parkinson's Disease treatments, as well as stem-cell research. However, the Palestinians lack a fundamental and substantive primary care system that can reach out to the local population. Infrastructural challenges restrict the movement of physicians and medical supplies, and lack of efficient logistics prevents a coordinated effort by all healthcare service providers to provide the necessary primary care. Because all medicines must be sourced through Israel, the PA is unable to take advantage of lower prices often available in Arab countries.

The ongoing COVID-19 pandemic emerged in the State of Palestine on 5 March 2020. Currently, 7.32% of the population within the recognized State of Palestine have received COVID-19 vaccinations, which is a total 4.21% below the global average of 11.53% and 55.76% below the State of Israel's total vaccination of 63.08%, drawing praise to Israel's "successful COVID-19 vaccine program". Such praise has been met with severe criticism by human rights organizations, citing Article 56 of the Fourth Geneva Convention, which states that "the Occupying Power has the duty of ensuring and maintaining, with the cooperation of national and local authorities, the medical and hospital establishments and services, public health and hygiene in the occupied territory, with particular reference to the adoption and application of the prophylactic and preventive measures necessary to combat the spread of contagious diseases and epidemics." However, the recent escalation of violence between Israel and Hamas between 10 May 2021 to 11 May 2021 exacerbated this disparity by spiking cases in Gaza after Israel's bombardment of Gaza's "central testing laboratory for COVID-19 at Rimal Clinic"; of over 2,300 housing units, driving 77,000 new Palestinians of Gaza into internal displacement and thus homelessness, further exacerbating the overcrowded conditions of Gaza; and through the 16 May 2021 Israeli airstrikes of the residential building, which resulted in the killing of Dr. Ayman Abu al-Auf, physician chief of internal medicine at Gaza's Al-Shifa Hospital, where he also served as the director of coronavirus response efforts.

While an immunization policy for Palestinian infants has recently been implemented, a policy for young adults and adults does not exist. According to the World Bank, only 44 percent of all Palestinians have access to "reasonable and customary" healthcare.

The Palestinian Authority and the Vital Statistics Records in Palestinerecords births in the region, and recent research suggests that the fertility rate of Palestinians is nearly at an all-time historical high. In fact, 46% of the population is under 15 years of age. These demographic shifts present interesting challenges and opportunities to the healthcare system in Palestine. While there is a socialized healthcare system within Palestine that provides universal and compulsory enrollment for all citizens, the healthcare provided in this universal plan is far below the normal standard of care accorded to healthy individuals. These inadequate healthcare provisions, along with improper preventative care and lifestyle choices, contribute to the four primary causes of death within the region, which include cardiovascular disease, cancer, cerebrovascular disease, and diabetes.

Among Palestinians aged 15–64 years, 58% of them are overweight, 36% have high levels of cholesterol, and 8.5% have diabetes mellitus. Additional contributors to poor health include a large prevalence (38%) of men who smoke, and that 75% of Palestinians who do not engage in any vigorous physical activity at all. The Palestinian National Health Strategy attempts to address and mitigate these health issues within the region by suggesting to citizens appropriate diet and exercise routines, providing good governance and leadership in overseeing and regulating the Palestinian health sector, and providing a framework for citizens to have access to and receive high quality, safe healthcare.

== Major challenges ==
=== Barriers to access ===
A 2012 article in The Lancet says the Israeli Military's blockade of the Gaza Strip as a major health challenge. Hospitals in the West Bank and in Gaza are sometimes not equipped to deal with more advanced medical problems and procedures. In such cases, doctors will refer their patients to more sophisticated treatment centers in Israel. Such treatment is often delayed by the Israeli bureaucratic process which has to approve requests. Ambulances traveling from Palestine to hospitals in East Jerusalem are often delayed or denied at security checkpoints. Moreover, within the West Bank, mobility is limited as residents must pass through Israeli checkpoints in order to travel in between various West Bank cities. This means that West Bank residents have trouble accessing healthcare providers located in other nearby West Bank towns. The limited mobility has even more serious ramifications in emergency situations wherein ambulances traveling in between West Bank towns experience delays.

According to the WHO, the residents of Gaza are in a particularly precarious position given Israeli tensions with the de facto Hamas government. Hamas claims that Israel has severely obstructed the flow of goods to that region since 2007, preventing the importation of essential medical equipment and prescription drugs. In recent years, periodic battles between Hamas militants and the Israeli Military have resulted in much damage to the medical infrastructure in Gaza which cannot be readily repaired due to limitations on the amounts of construction material being imported to the region. According to the Israeli government, it has imposed no restrictions whatever on medical supplies and equipment since 2010. In any case, supplies could be imported through Gaza's border with Egypt. Additionally, Palestinian officials maintain that the quality of healthcare professionals in Gaza has been hampered as they are often not permitted to travel abroad to conventions and training sessions where they can advance their skills and knowledge.

=== Lack of control over Gaza ===
Besides the problems posed by the conflict with Israel, a major challenge to healthcare in the PNA territories is the fact that the PNA is currently not at liberty to physically implement policy in Gaza. Currently, the extent of its involvement in Gaza healthcare is limited to the financial contributions it makes there.

=== Mental health ===
The mental health of Palestinians has been described as among the worst in the world, with over half of Palestinian adults meeting the diagnostic threshold for depression and a significant portion of Palestinian children experiencing mental distress, particularly in Gaza. This high prevalence of mental distress among the Palestinian population has been attributed to the intersection of a number of factors, including exposure to conflict, poor living conditions and restrictions on movement.

== Reforms: The National Health Strategy ==
Though challenges in the geo-political situation facing the PNA strain national health objectives, the PNA focuses on areas for which progress is under its direct control. These areas have been identified in the MOH's recently issued National Health Strategy, which was assembled in conjunction with representatives from the major "sectors" of the Palestinian health system. The ideas outlined in this document currently serve as the basis for reform. The PNA believes that the future policies inherent in its National Health Strategy also apply to Gazans, despite Hamas' de facto control of the region. According to the Oslo Accords, the PNA maintains de jure jurisdiction over the people of Gaza, and the PNA hopes to implement in Gaza the same reforms underway in the West Bank at a time when this is possible. However, the National Health Strategy makes no mention of refugees living in Jordan, Lebanon, and Syria, as the Oslo Accords maintain that these individuals fall under UNRWA jurisdiction until final negotiations can determine their status. Hence, the plan does not account for a potential future resettlement of refugees.

=== Health financing ===
The PNA has identified government expenditure on healthcare to be unsustainable in the long term, absent alterations in financing mechanisms. Approximately 30.5% of those receiving healthcare provisions from the government do not currently contribute to the system, causing the PNA to incur debt or rely on donations to cover the difference. Moreover, in recent years, participation in the government's health plan has declined, resulting in the MOH with fewer revenues. In response, the PNA is currently considering adopting a single-payer healthcare system whereby all Palestinian residents under its de facto jurisdiction will be mandated to purchase insurance from the government. Currently, mandates to purchase the PNA's insurance extend only to civil servants and retirees. The PNA hopes that a universal scheme will stabilize revenues and reduce inefficiencies. To meet the new demands that universal coverage would place on the system, the PNA will first have to make substantial investments in the MOH's administrative capabilities.

=== Health informatics ===
The WHO has described the PNA's Health Information System (HIS) as "incomplete, fragmented, unreliable, and outdated". With $86 million in assistance from the United States Agency for International Development (USAID), the PNA plans to upgrade its HIS from paper based to electronic, the first such system in the Arab Middle East. A central database is to provide computerized and up to date information on matters such as medical professionals, patient medical records, and prescription drug use. In addition to streamlining information on individual patients across all medical facilities, the data gathered will be used for research, enabling the medical community to pinpoint health trends and incidence of disease more accurately than ever before.

== See also ==
- Health in the State of Palestine
- List of hospitals in the State of Palestine
- Mental health in Palestine

== Sources ==
- "Mental Health in the West Bank and Gaza" (PDF). World Bank. 22 November 2022. Archived (PDF) from the original on 2 April 2024.
