= List of regions of Palestine by Human Development Index =

This is a list of regions of the State of Palestine by Human Development Index as of 2022.

Rank	Region	HDI (2022)
High human development
1	Jenin, Tubas, Tulkarm, Nablus, Qalqilya	0.725
2	Bethlehem, Hebron	0.720
3	Salfit, Ramallah and Al-Bireh, Jericho	0.717
–	Palestine	0.715
4	Jerusalem	0.711
5	Deir al-Balah, Khan Yunis, Rafah	0.707
6	North Gaza, Gaza	0.703

== Trends by UNDP reports (international HDI) ==
Human Development Index (by UN Method) of Palestinian Governorates since 2004.

Unit	HDI 2004	HDI 2005	HDI 2006	HDI 2007	HDI 2008	HDI 2009	HDI 2010	HDI 2011	HDI 2012	HDI 2013	HDI 2014	HDI 2015	HDI 2016	HDI 2017	HDI 2018
Bethlehem, Hebron	0.631	0.639	0.640	0.649	0.654	0.659	0.664	0.672	0.678	0.675	0.676	0.679	0.682	0.684	0.685
Deir al-Balah, Khan Yunis, Rafah	0.646	0.654	0.655	0.665	0.669	0.675	0.680	0.685	0.688	0.683	0.680	0.683	0.686	0.688	0.689
Jenin, Tubas, Tulkarm, Nablus, Qalqilya	0.636	0.643	0.644	0.654	0.658	0.663	0.668	0.680	0.689	0.690	0.695	0.698	0.700	0.702	0.703
Jerusalem	0.652	0.659	0.660	0.670	0.675	0.680	0.685	0.693	0.699	0.695	0.696	0.699	0.701	0.703	0.704
North Gaza, Gaza	0.638	0.645	0.646	0.656	0.661	0.666	0.671	0.672	0.672	0.662	0.656	0.659	0.662	0.664	0.664
Salfit, Ramallah and Al-Bireh, Jericho	0.634	0.642	0.642	0.652	0.656	0.661	0.666	0.680	0.691	0.693	0.700	0.703	0.705	0.707	0.708
Palestine	0.638	0.646	0.647	0.657	0.661	0.666	0.671	0.679	0.684	0.681	0.682	0.685	0.687	0.689	0.690

== See also ==
- Demographics of Palestine
- Economy of Palestine
- Education in Palestine
- Health in Palestine
