= Bethlehem Psychiatric Hospital =

Hospital in Bethlehem, West Bank, Palestine

Coordinates: 31°41′56.5346″N 35°11′32.0424″E

Bethlehem Psychiatric Hospital مستشفى بيت لحم للطب النفسي
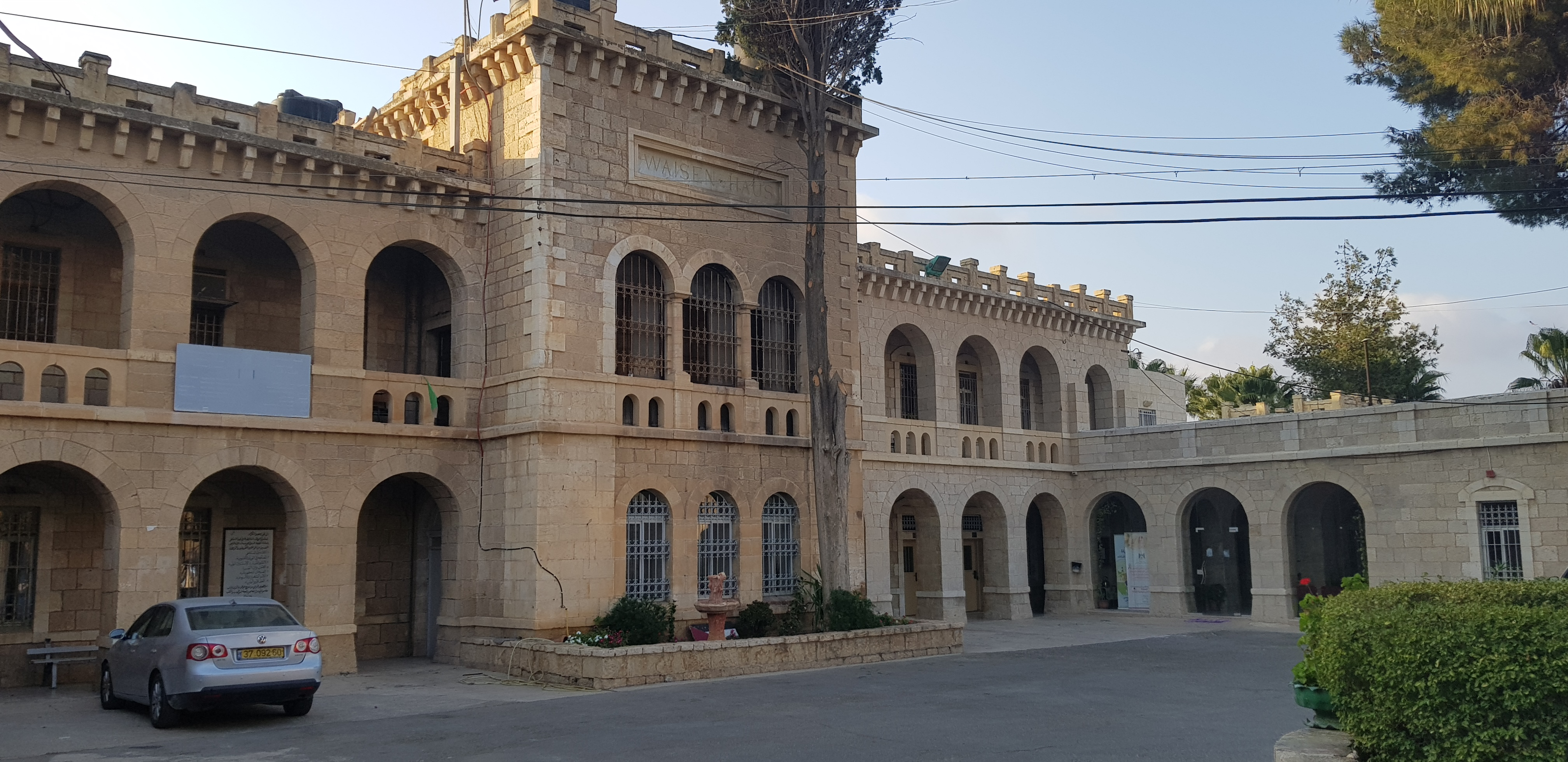

Geography
- Location: Bethlehem city, Bethlehem Governorate, West Bank, the State of Palestine

Organisation
- Type: District General

Services
- Beds: 140

History
- Founded: 1922

Links
- Lists: Hospitals in the State of Palestine

Bethlehem Psychiatric Hospital, or Dr. Muhammad Saeed Kamal Psychiatric Hospital, (Arabic: مستشفى بيت لحم للطب النفسي) is a Palestinian medical institution located in the city of Bethlehem in the West Bank. It is the only hospital of its kind specializing in psychiatric treatment in the West Bank and has operated for over 100 years.

== History ==
The hospitals main building was constructed in 1898 and had an area of 2 dunams, initially used as a charitable orphnage for Armenian children. The building was repurposed in 1922 by British Mandate authorities and converted into a hospital for mentally ill men. It was converted to a psychiatric hospital for men and women in 1957 by the Jordanian authorities. In 1992, it was named after the physician Dr. Muhammad Saeed Kamal in recognition of his efforts and administration of the hospital between 1959 and 1992. In 2004, the hospital was damaged during a raid by the IDF. The facility had 75 staff and 250 patients in 2004, at the time, there were a total of 9 psychiatrists and 15 clinical psychologists in the west bank, which had a population of 2.7 million.

Between 2016 and 2019, the hospital was renovated as part of a European Union funded project in collaboration with the WHO. In 2025, it had been announced that the mens ward, which had been unused for years by then, had been renovated and reopened with support from the Korea International Cooperation Agency.

== Services ==
Its clinical capacity is approximately 140 beds. As of 2020, 150-170 patients resided in the hospital. The hospital complex includes 4 buildings dedicated to the patients, and occupies an area of 60 dunams.

Comprehensive treatment services include:

- Pharmacological treatment, psychotherapy, occupational rehabilitation therapy, community mental health services, outpatient clinics, electroencephalography (EEG), and forensic medicine.
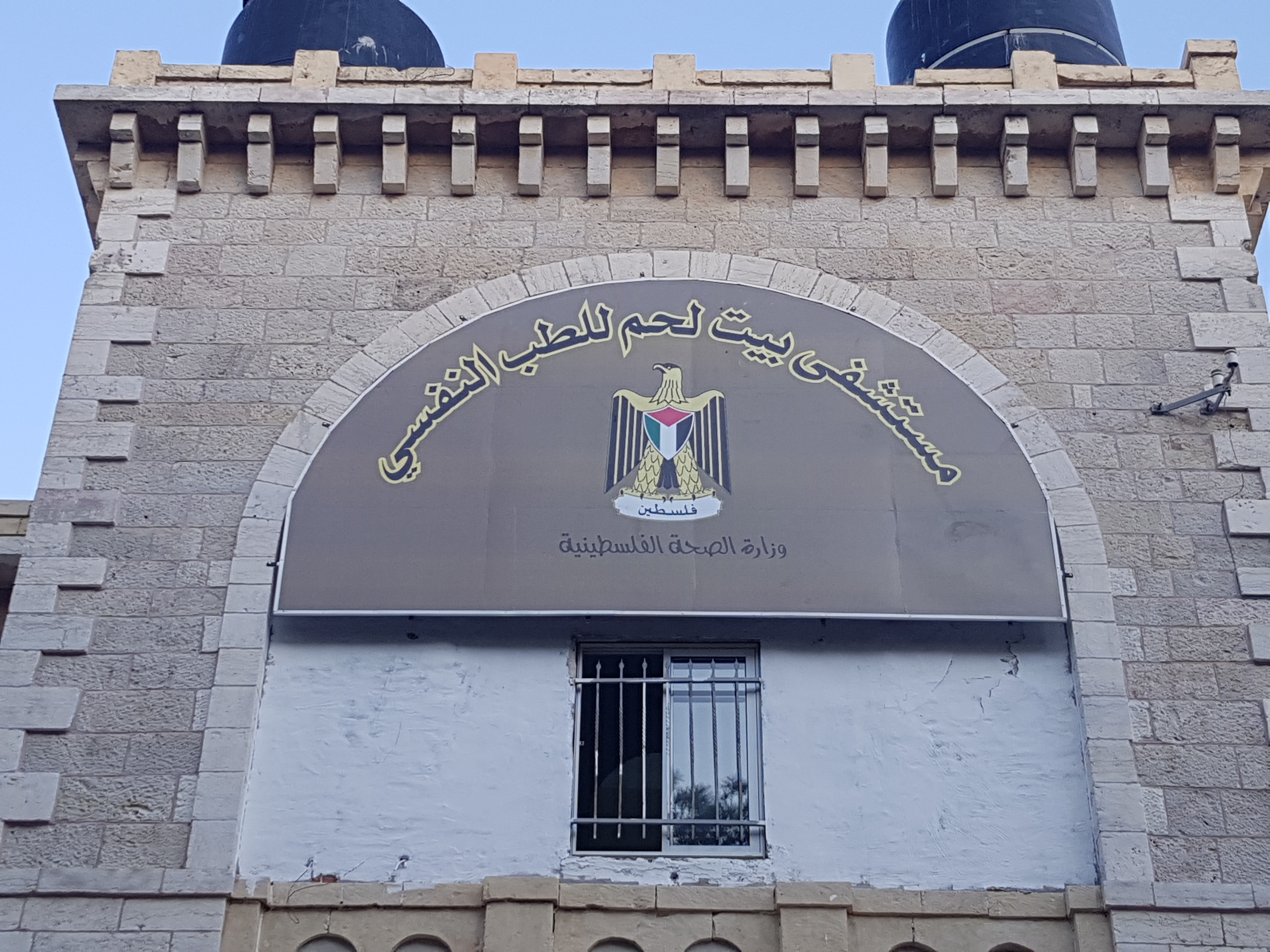
- Bethlehem Psychiatric Hospital
  Educational and Training Services.
- The hospital is recognized as a teaching hospital by both the Jordanian and Palestinian Medical Councils.
- It offers programs for the qualification and training of psychiatry resident physicians, interns, medical students (especially from Al-Quds University), nursing college students, and students of humanities such as social work.

== See also ==
- List of hospitals in Palestine
- Mental health in Palestine
