= Palestinian Red Crescent Society Specialized Hospital, Hebron =

Hospital in Hebron, West Bank, Palestine

Coordinates: 31.53176°N 35.090914°E

Palestinian Red Crescent Society Specialized Hospital مستشفى جمعية الهلال الأحمر التخصصي
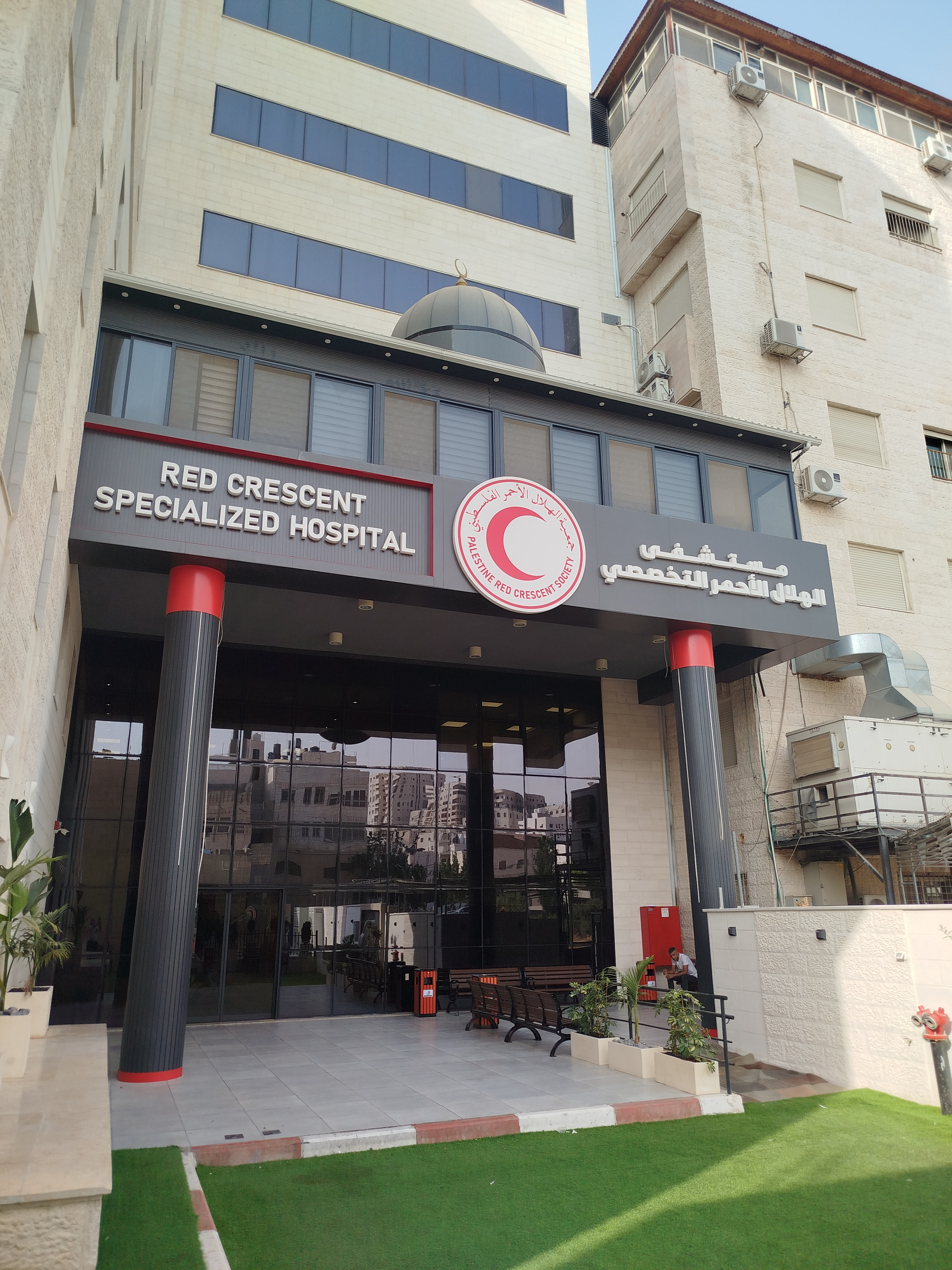

Geography
- Location: Hebron City, Hebron Governorate, West Bank, State of Palestine

Services
- Beds: 65

History
- Founded: 2011

The Palestinian Red Crescent Society (PRCS) Specialized Hospital is a Palestinian medical institution affiliated with the Red Crescent Movement. It is located in the city of Hebron and is considered one of the main hospitals offering specialized services in the southern West Bank.

== Establishment ==
The Palestinian Red Crescent Society began efforts to establish the Specialized Hospital in 1999, and it officially commenced operations as a specialized hospital in 2011.

== Services ==
- The hospital operates with a bed capacity of approximately 65 beds.It plays a vital role in providing advanced care for mothers and children in the region.
- The hospital offers a range of important medical services and units, aiming to reduce the need to transfer complex cases for treatment outside of Palestine.

== Departments ==
Obstetrics and Gynecology Department Neonatal Intensive Care Unit (NICU) Pediatric Intensive Care Unit (PICU) Pediatric General Surgery Department General Pediatric Care Department

== Development ==
Future plans include:

- Adding a new building and rehabilitating the existing structure, which will double the hospital's bed capacity to approximately 150 beds.
- Adding new medical specializations and developing current services to serve a larger number of residents in the Hebron Governorate.

== See also ==
- List of hospitals in Palestine
