= Jericho Governmental Hospital =

Hospital in Jericho, West Bank, Palestine

Jericho Governmental Hospital مستشفى أريحا الحكومي
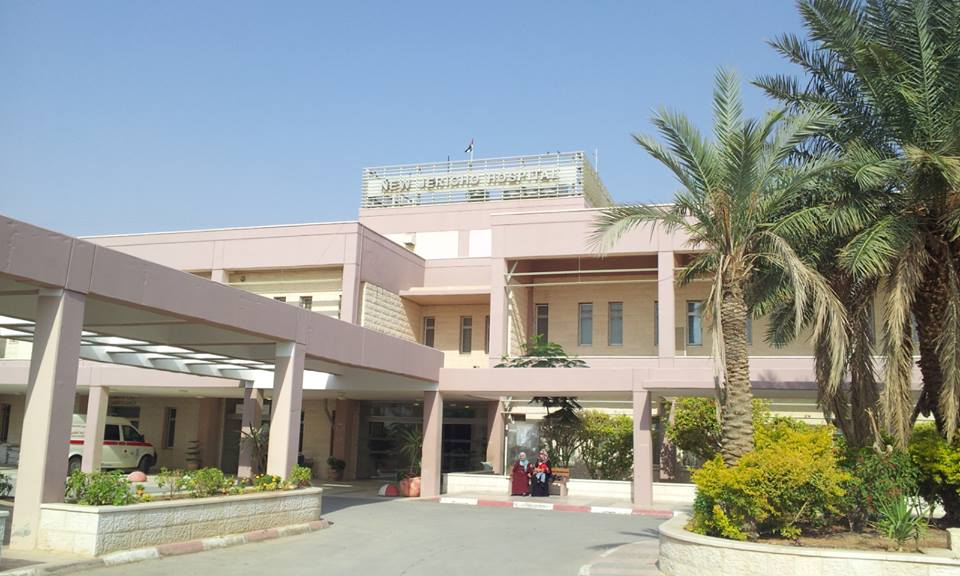

Geography
- Location: Jericho, Jericho Governorate, West Bank, Palestine
- Coordinates: 31°50′10″N 35°27′28″E

Organisation
- Care system: Public
- Type: Community

Services
- Emergency department: Yes
- Beds: 54

History
- Founded: 1998

Jericho Governmental Hospital (Arabic: مستشفى أريحا الحكومي) is a government hospital in the Jericho city, West Bank, Palestine. Followed by the Palestinian Ministry of Health.

== Establishment ==
It was established in 1998 with funding from the Japanese Government.

== Clinical Capacity ==
Its clinical capacity is approximately 54 beds.

== Location ==
It is located in Jericho, on Al-Quds Street, Aqabat Jaber.

== Services ==
It provides medical services to the residents of the Jericho Governorate and surrounding areas.

== Departments ==
The hospital includes multiple departments to provide healthcare, including:

- Emergency
- Operations (Surgery)
- Obstetrics and Gynecology
- Nephrology (Dialysis)
- Radiology
- Laboratory and Blood Bank
- Outpatient Clinic

== See also ==
- List of hospitals in Palestine
