= Governorates of Palestine =

First-level administrative subdivisions

Governorates of Palestine محافظات فلسطين (Arabic)
- Also known as: Muhafazat filastin
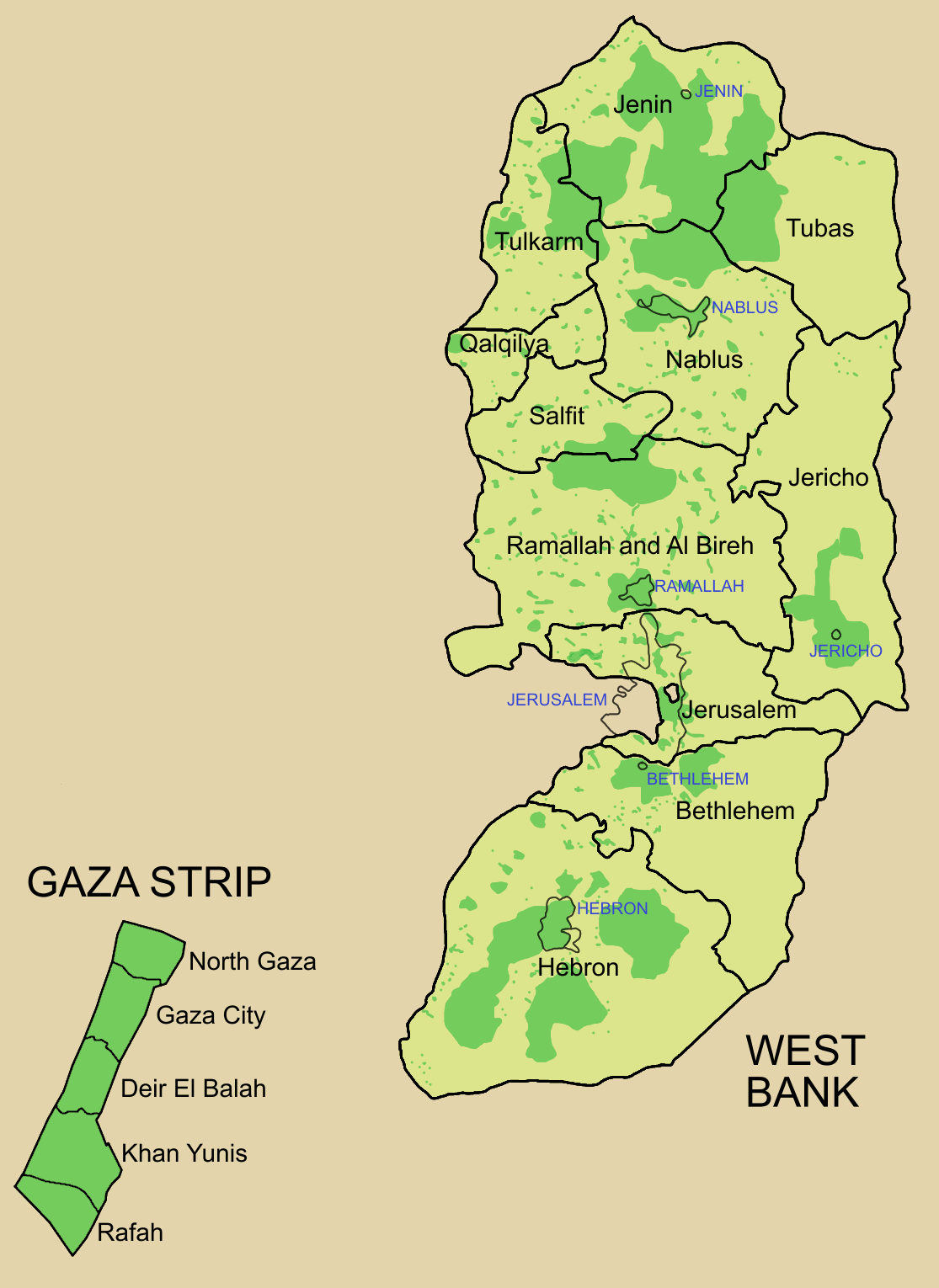
- Map of Area A, Palestinian localities in Area B and Palestinian neighborhoods in East Jerusalem.
- Category: Unitary state
- Location: Palestine
- Number: 16 governorates
- Populations: 316,541 (Jericho) – 551,129 (Hebron)
- Areas: 88 km^{2} (34 sq mi) (Deir al-Balah) – 1,700 km^{2} (658 sq mi) (Hebron)
- Government: Governorate government, National government
- Subdivisions: Municipality, refugee camp, neighbourhood

Palestine is a unitary state, but is divided into sixteen governorates for administrative purposes. After the signing of the Oslo Accords, the West Bank and Gaza Strip were placed under the jurisdiction of the Palestinian Authority, which divided the territories into governorates. The governorates are subdivided in turn into municipalities.

== List ==
Governorates
Governorate	Population (2017)	Area (km^{2})	Population density	Capital	Region	Location
Bethlehem Governorate	217400	644	337.6	Bethlehem	West Bank	
Hebron Governorate	711223	1060	671	Hebron	West Bank	
Jenin Governorate	314866	583	540.1	Jenin	West Bank	
Jericho Governorate	50002	608	82.24	Jericho	West Bank	
Jerusalem Governorate (Note: includes Israeli-annexed East Jerusalem)	435483	344	1,265.9	Jerusalem (Note: see Status of Jerusalem)	West Bank	
Nablus Governorate	388321	592	655.9	Nablus	West Bank	
Qalqilya Governorate	112400	164	685.4	Qalqilya	West Bank	
Ramallah and al-Bireh Governorate	328861	844	389.65	Ramallah	West Bank	
Salfit Governorate	75444	191	395.0	Salfit	West Bank	
Tubas Governorate	60927	372	163.78	Tubas	West Bank	
Tulkarm Governorate	186760	239	781.4	Tulkarm	West Bank	
Deir al-Balah Governorate	273200	56	4,880	Deir al-Balah	Gaza	
Gaza Governorate	652597	70	9,300	Gaza City	Gaza	
Khan Yunis Governorate	370638	108	3,432	Khan Yunis	Gaza	
North Gaza Governorate	368978	61	6,050	Jabalia	Gaza	
Rafah Governorate	233878	65	3,598	Rafah	Gaza	

== See also ==
- ISO 3166-2:PS
- List of regions of Palestine by Human Development Index
