= Princess Alia Governmental Hospital, Hebron =

Hospital in Hebron, West Bank, Palestine

Princess Alia Governmental Hospital, Hebron مستشفى عالية الحكومي
- Palestinian Ministry of Health
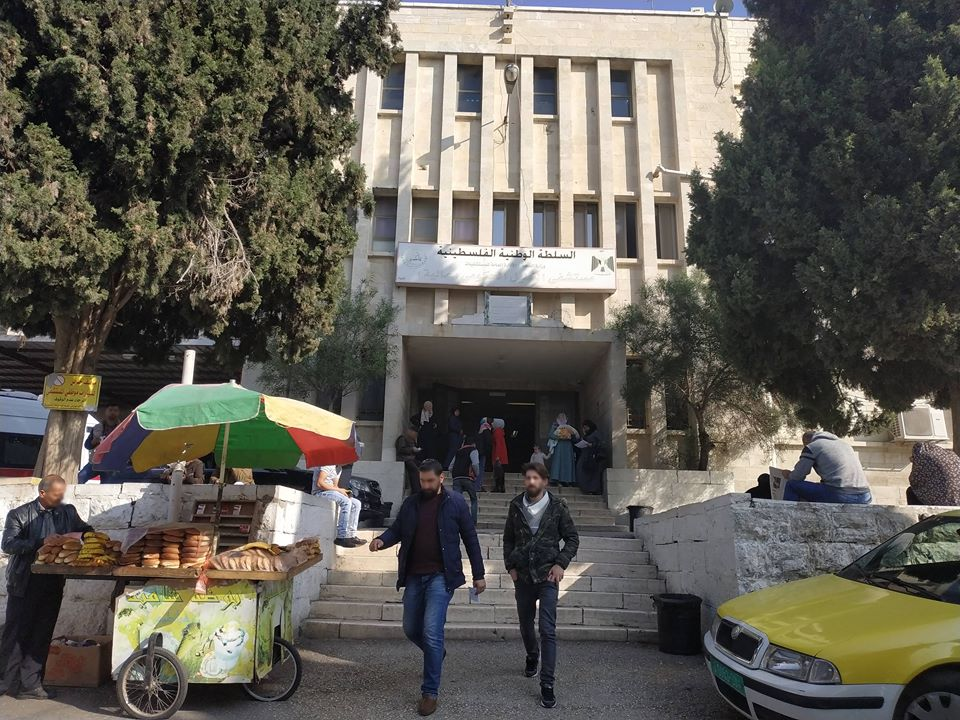

Geography
- Location: Hebron City, Hebron Governorate, West Bank, State of Palestine
- Coordinates: 31.530440°N 35.099933°E

Organisation
- Care system: Public
- Type: Community

Services
- Emergency department: Yes
- Beds: 237

History
- Founded: 1957

Princess Alia Governmental Hospital or Hebron Governmental Hospital is a government hospital in the Hebron city, West Bank, Palestine. It is managed by the Palestinian Ministry of Health.

== Importance ==
It is considered one of the largest governmental health institutions and the central government hospital in the southern West Bank. It serves hundreds of thousands of citizens in the Hebron Governorate and neighboring areas, and works to localize health services and reduce referrals for treatment abroad.

== Establishment ==
It was built in 1957 during the reign of King Hussein bin Talal, and it developed and expanded after the establishment of the Palestinian Authority.

== Clinical capacity ==
Its clinical capacity is approximately 237 beds.

== Key services ==
It includes multiple departments such as Emergency, Operations, General Surgery, Specialized Surgeries (such as Orthopedics, Neurosurgery, and Urology), Internal Medicine, Intensive Care, Artificial Kidney (Dialysis), and others.

== See also ==
- List of hospitals in Palestine
