= Dura Governmental Hospital =

Hospital in Dura, West Bank, Palestine

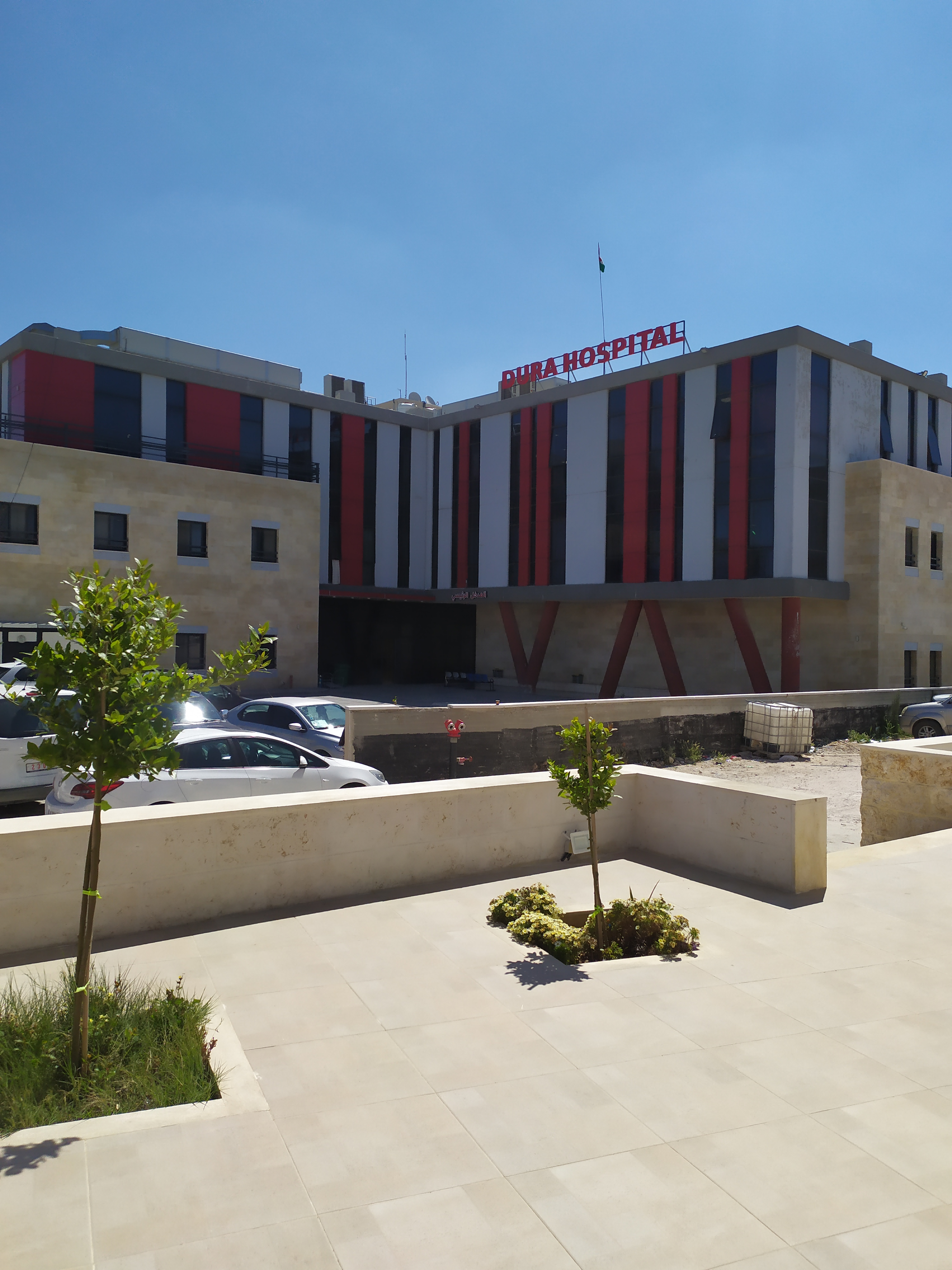

Geography
- Location: Dura, Hebron, Hebron Governorate, West Bank, Palestine
- Coordinates: 31°29′36″N 35°02′45″E

Organisation
- Care system: Public
- Type: Community

Services
- Emergency department: Yes
- Beds: 43

History
- Founded: 2021

Dura Governmental Hospital (Arabic: مستشفى دورا الحكومي) is a Palestinian government hospital located in the city of Dura, south of the West Bank. It was established with support from the Italian government and contributions from the local community and the Palestinian Ministry of Health.

== Building area ==
It is built on approximately 20 dunams of land. The building area is approximately 6,000 square meters.

It has a bed capacity of 43 beds.

== Services ==
Dura Government Hospital provides government medical services to the residents of Dura city and its villages.

== Gallery ==
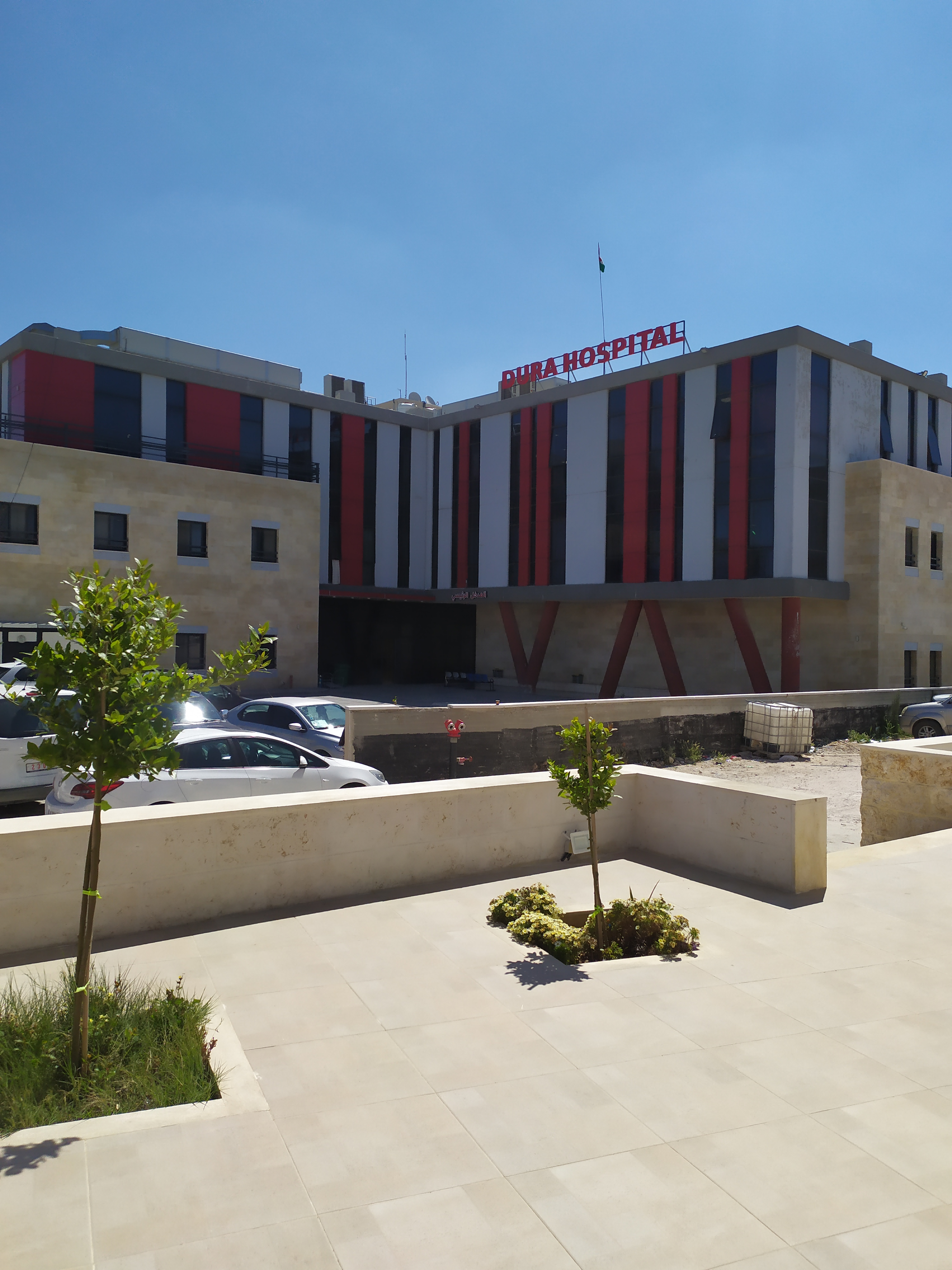
Dura Governmental Hospital

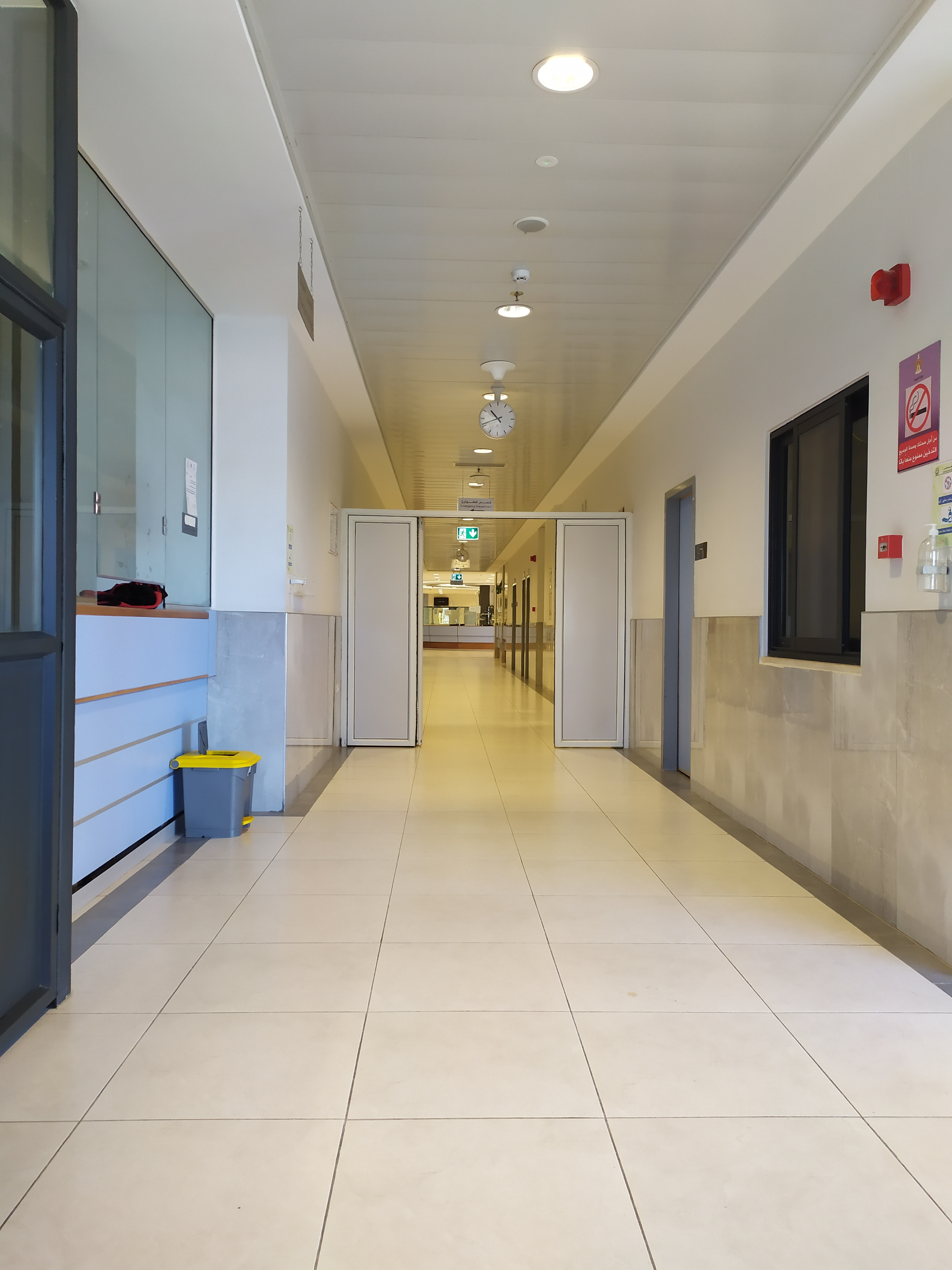
Dura Governmental Hospital

== See also ==
- List of hospitals in Palestine
