= An-Najah National University Hospital =

Hospital in Nablus, Palestine

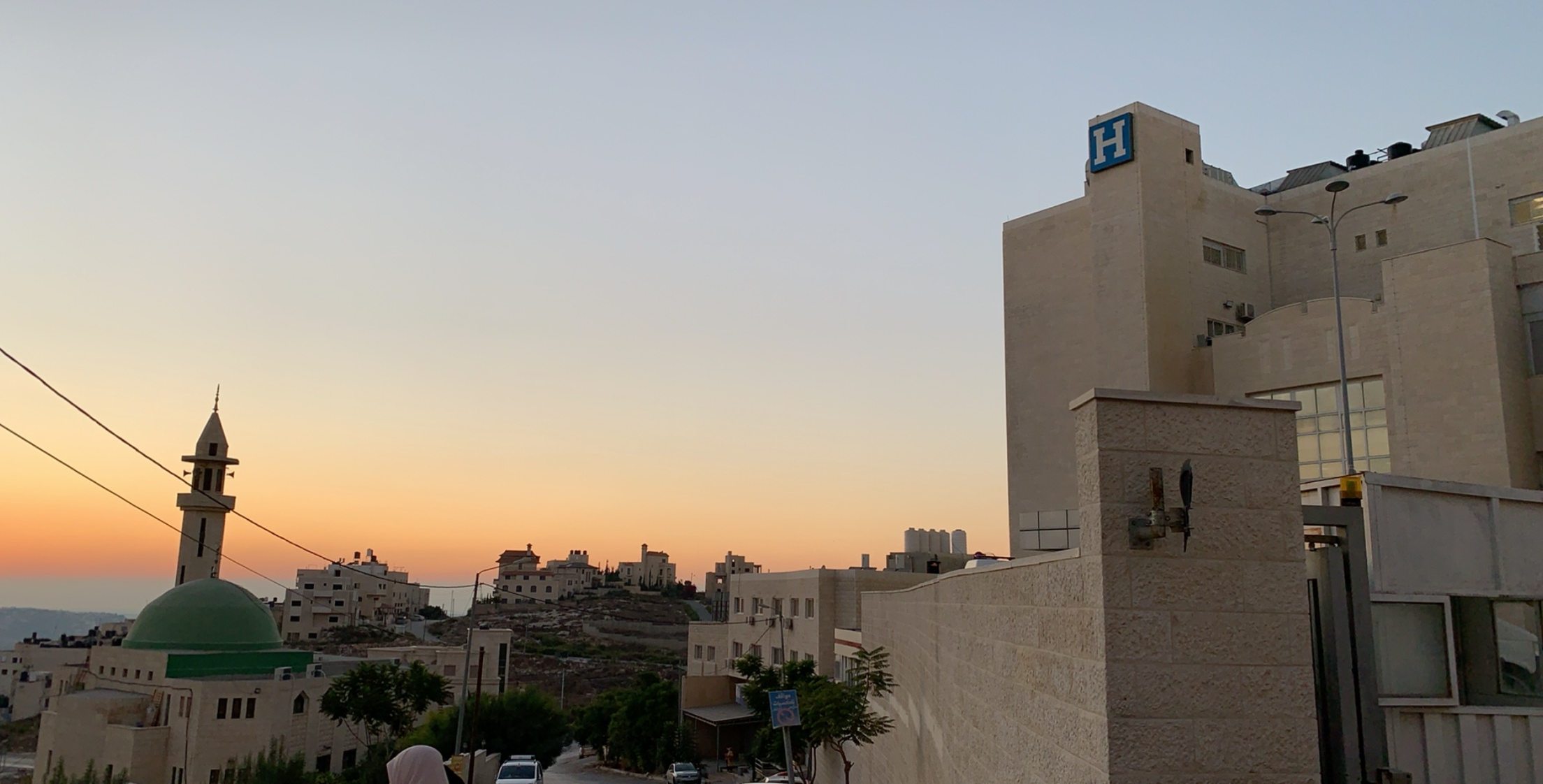

Geography
- Location: Nablus, Palestine
- Coordinates: 32.239261°N 35.245666°E

Organisation
- Type: Teaching
- Affiliated university: An-Najah National University

History
- Opened: 2013

Links
- Website: www.najah.edu/ar/community/annu-hospital
- Lists: Hospitals in Palestine

An-Najah National University Hospital is a non-profit teaching hospital and is one of the teaching hospitals in Palestine. An-Najah National University Hospital was established in 2013 in partnership with the College of Medicine and Health Sciences at An-Najah National University. It is located in the northwestern mountainous area of Nablus, on the exit to Asira Al Shamaliah.

An-Najah National University began building the An-Najah National University Hospital in 2008, and opened its first phase in 2014 with a capacity of 127 beds in an area of 17,000 square meters. Construction work on the second phase commenced early 2018 covering an area of 65,000 square meters. In 2019, the hospital opened a branch in Atil in Tulkarm.

== Services ==
The hospital provides treatment services through its various departments, which are: radiology, children, tissues, ear, nose, throat, tumors, anesthesia, intensive care and pain management, sterilization, nutrition, general surgery, pharmacy, preventive medicine, emergency, physical therapy, care Central and internal surgery, cardiac catheterization, industrial college, medical laboratories, urology, national institute of heart and lung transplant surgery, flexible diagnostic and therapeutic endoscopes, neurosurgery and orthopedics, bone marrow transplant, ophthalmology, electrophysiology of the heart. In addition, the hospital, as an educational hospital, provides educational services to college students, provides education and health care and provides space for medical research and training.

== Achievements ==
- Clinically fatal patient in Nablus for surgery in 2016
- The first artificial heart transplant in Palestine in 2016
