= Al Ahli Hospital, Hebron =

Hospital in Hebron, West Bank, Palestine

Al Ahli Hospital مستشفى الأهلي (الخليل)
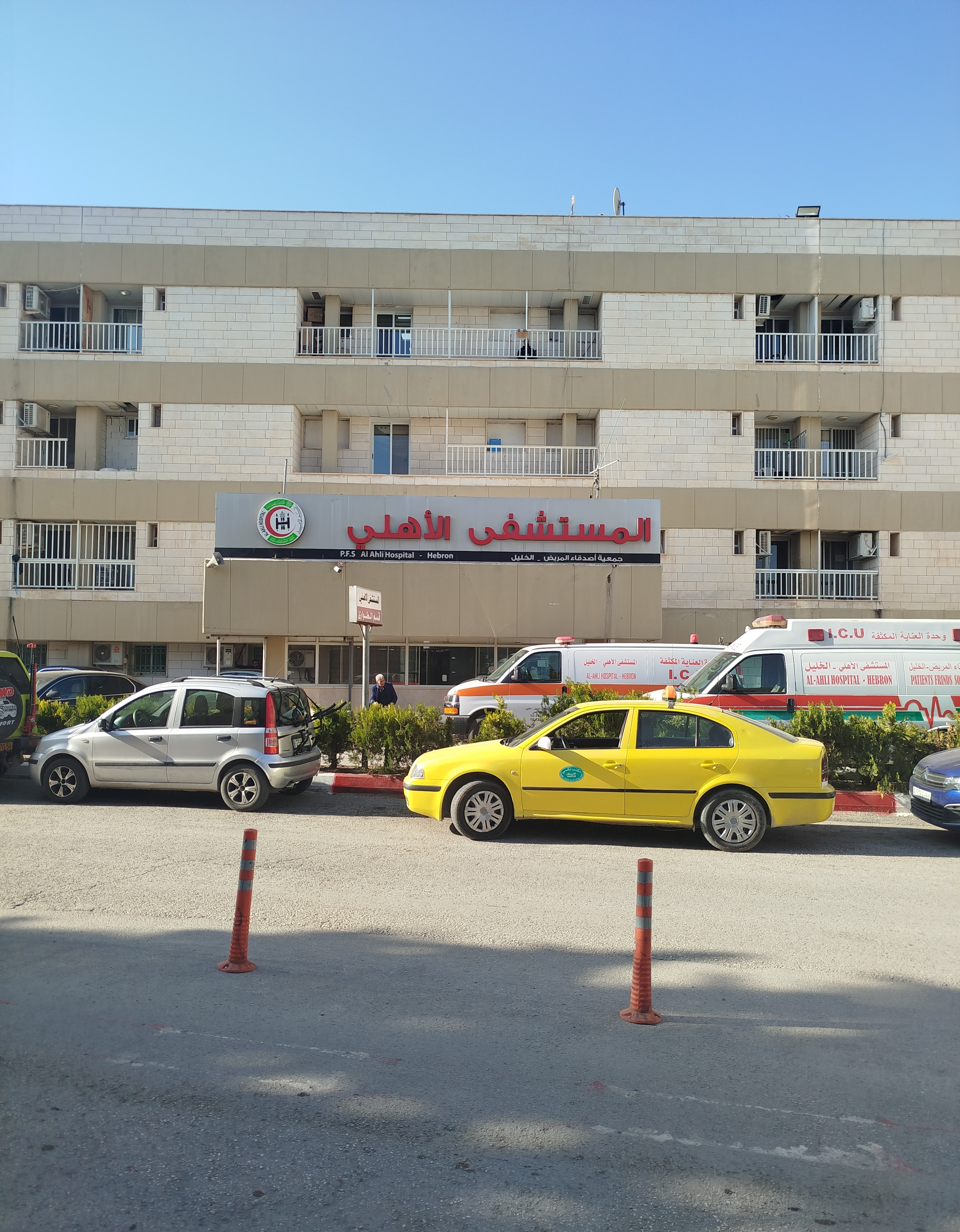

Geography
- Location: Hebron City, Hebron Governorate, West Bank, State of Palestine
- Coordinates: 31.5565007°N 35.0830924°E

Services
- Beds: 250

History
- Founded: 1988

Al-Ahli Hospital (Arabic: مستشفى الأهلي) is a private hospital affiliated with the Patient's Friends Association, located in the city of Hebron in the southern West Bank.

== History ==
Al-Ahli Hospital was established in 1988 on a land area of 30,000 m^{2}.

== Bed capacity ==
The hospital operates with a capacity of 250 beds and employs more than 880 staff members. It is considered the largest private hospital in the West Bank.

== Services ==
Al-Ahli Hospital includes all major medical departments, such as the Electrophysiology Unit for cardiac electrical disorders, the Neurovascular Catheterization Unit, and the only licensed Nuclear Medicine Unit in Palestine.

== Departments ==
The hospital comprises several departments, including:

- Emergency and Ambulance
- Outpatient Clinics
- Surgical Operations
- Obstetrics and Gynecology
- Neonatal and Pediatric Care
- Internal Medicine
- Intensive Care
- In addition to daily-care units and departments for lithotripsy, dentistry, nuclear medicine, radiology, pharmacy, laboratory and blood bank, physiotherapy, and sterilization.

== Facilities ==
The hospital is affiliated with a College of Nursing that offers three essential specializations: Nursing, Midwifery, and Anesthesia Technology.

== See also ==
- List of hospitals in Palestine

== Gallery ==
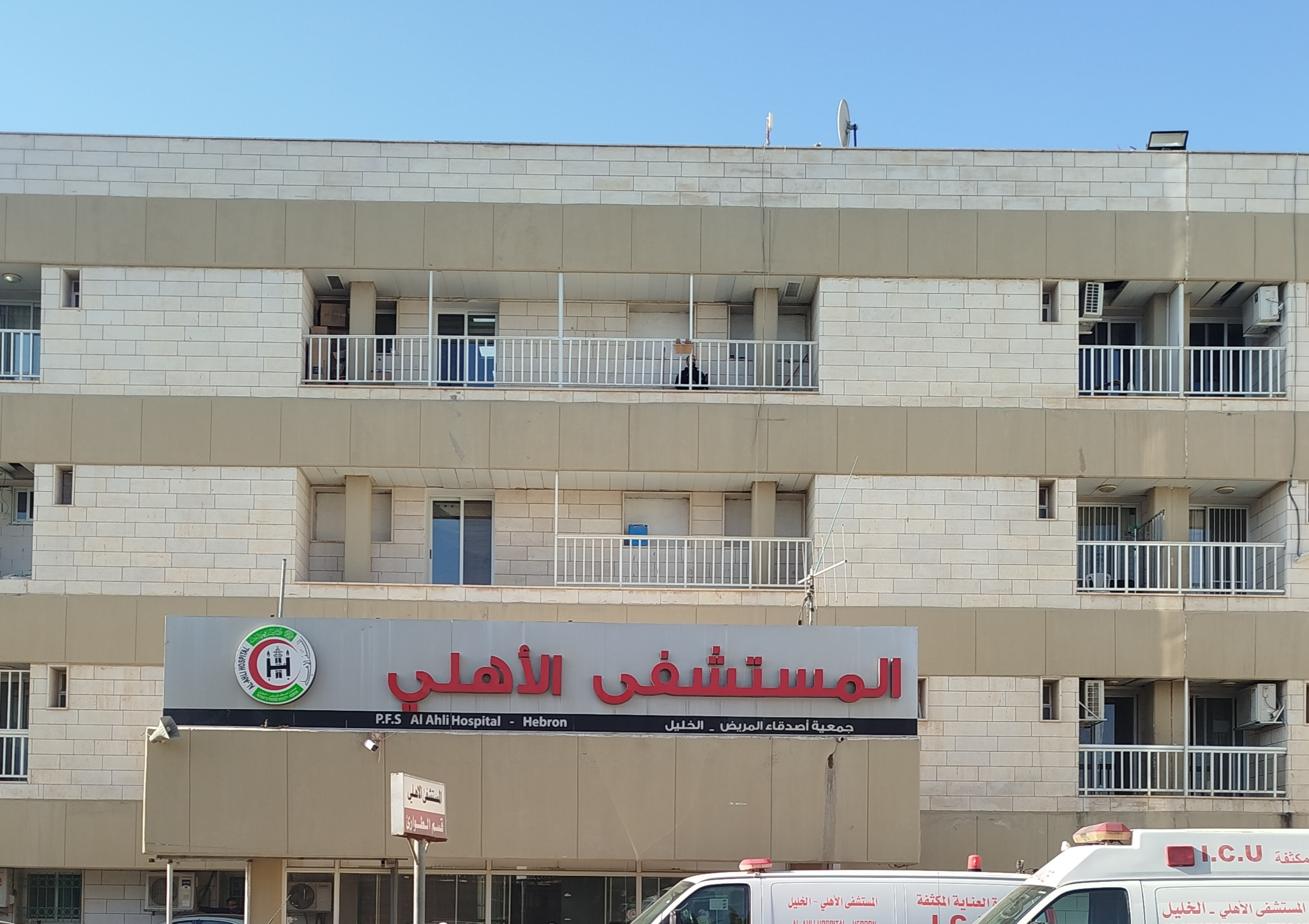
Al Ahli Hospital

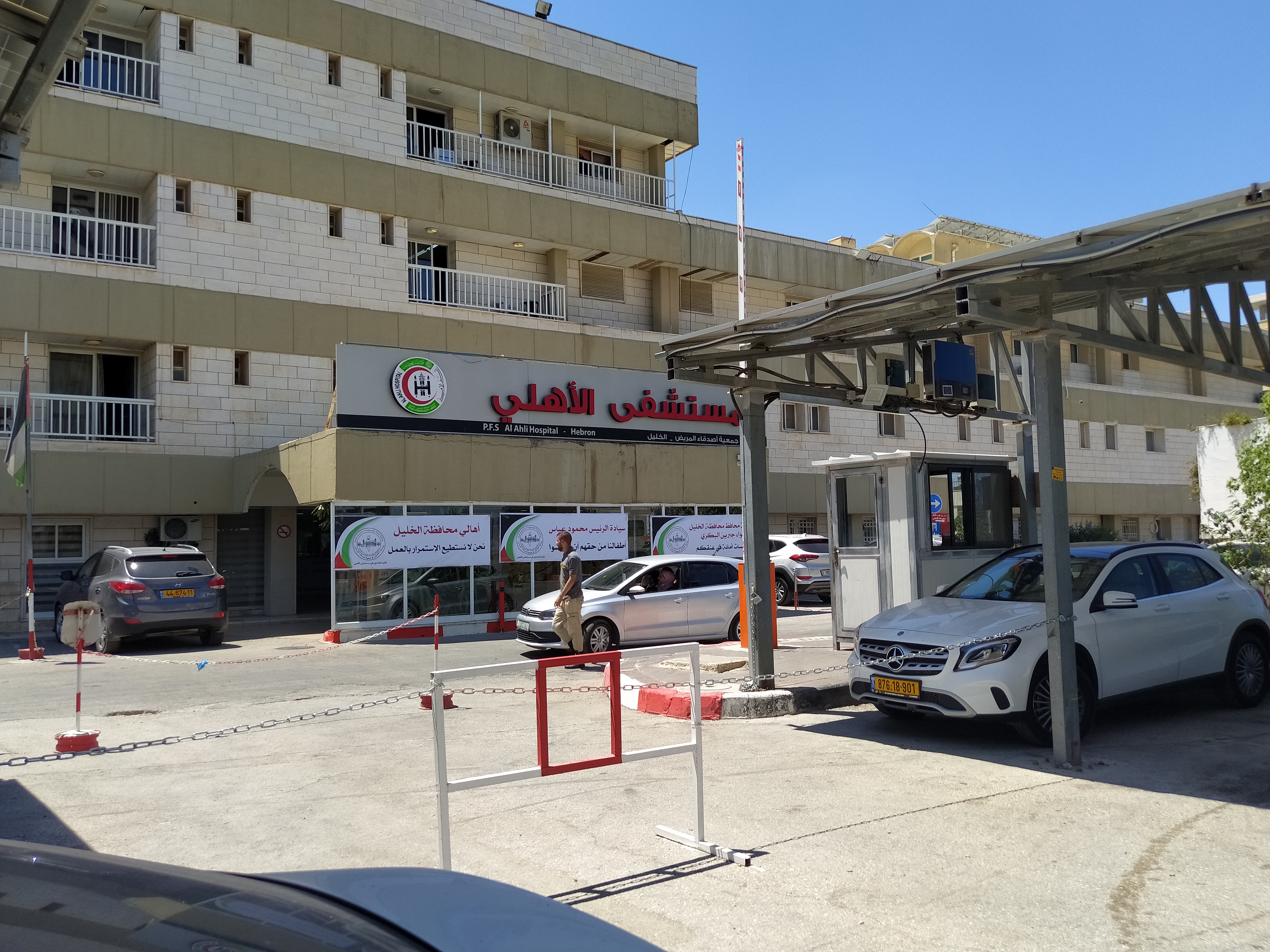
A view of the Al-Ahli Hospital building in Hebron.

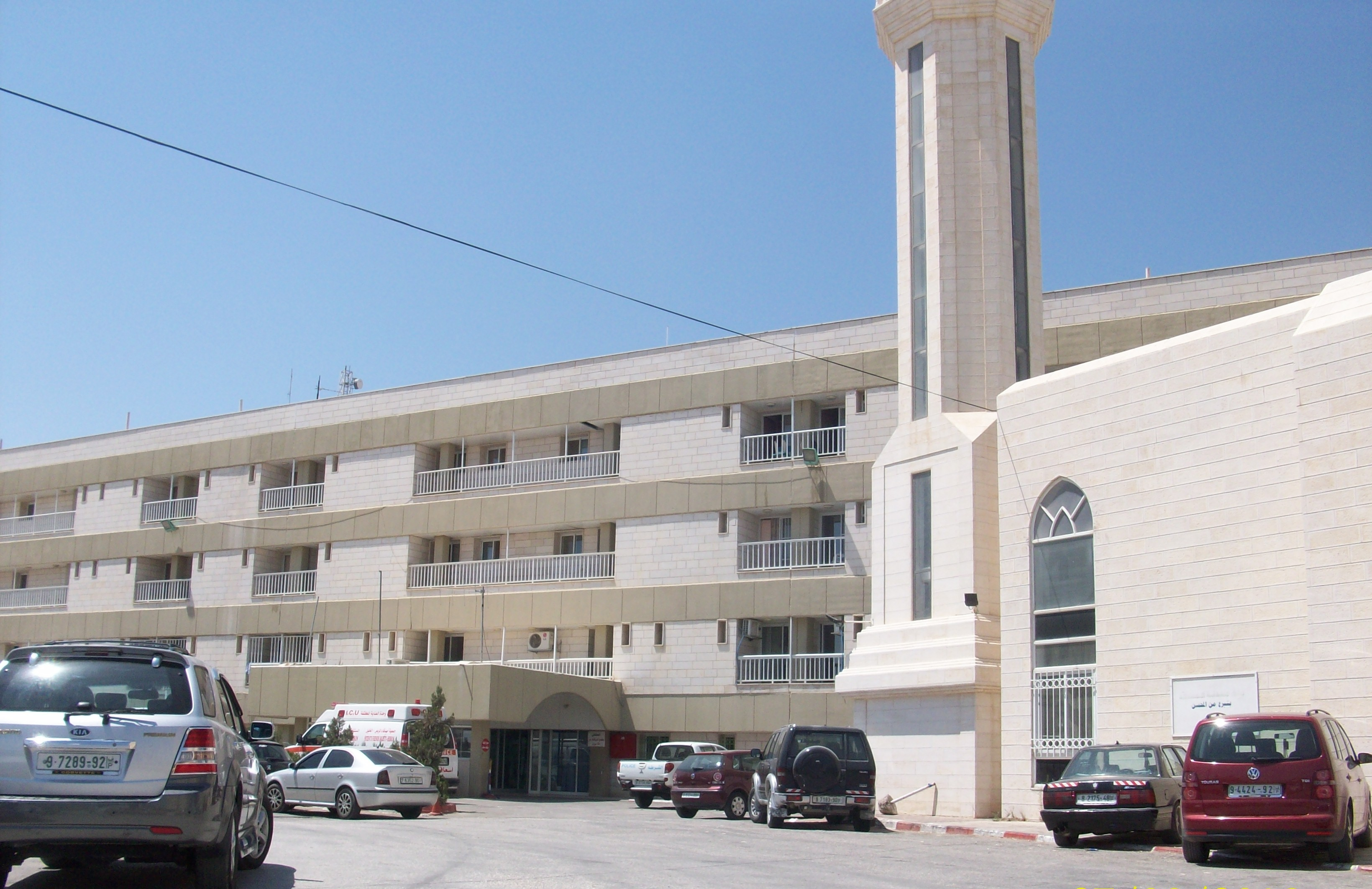
Al Ahli Hospital, Hebron
