= Health in Palestine =

Health issues in Palestine

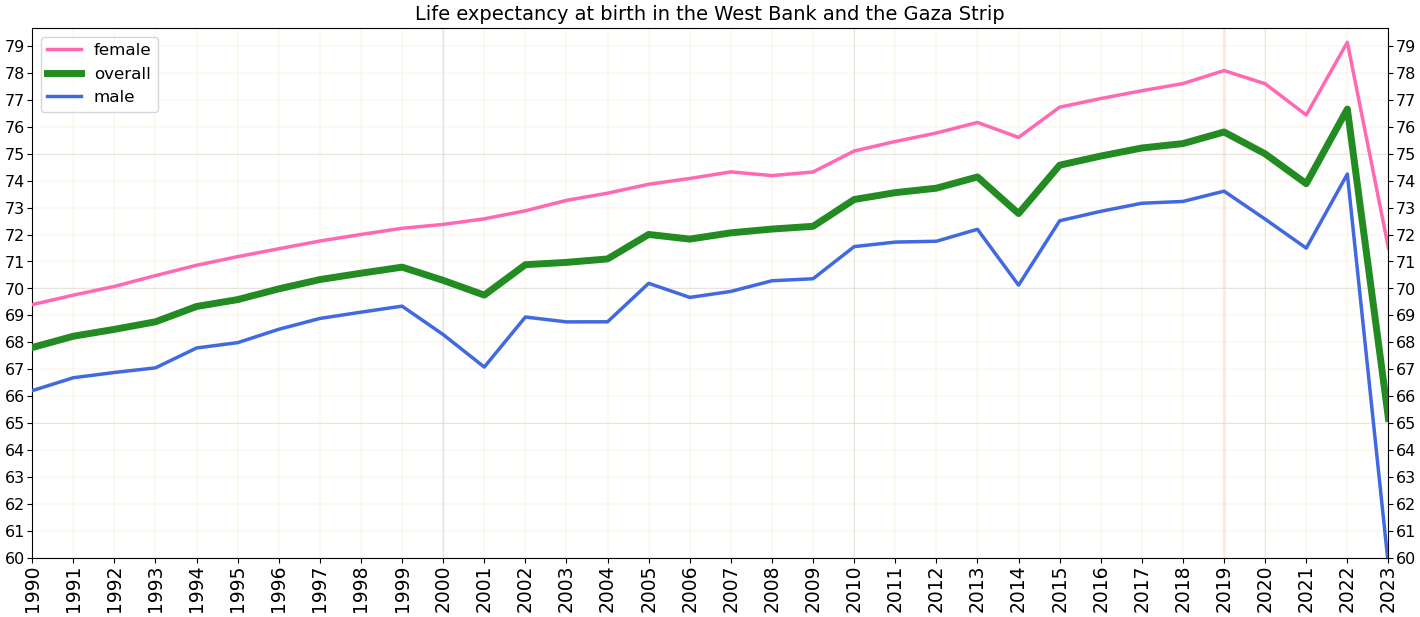
Life expectancy in Palestine up to 2023

Health in Palestine should be addressed by the healthcare system in the State of Palestine. There are problems arising from difficulty of access, water scarcity while burden of non-communicable diseases in Palestine is high; the problems are compounded in Gaza.

== Obesity ==
According to the World Health Organization, obesity affects 26.8% of the Palestinian population (23.3% males, 30.8% females). This is mostly due to decreased physical activity and greater than necessary food consumption, particularly with an increase in energy coming from fat. Two other factors are smoking and urbanization. In addition, "leisure-time physical activity is not a common concept in the Palestinian context, especially for rural women, where lack of sex-segregated facilities and cultural norms are prohibitive factors." Women in urban areas face similar cultural restrictions.

However, a study of Gazan mothers between the ages of 18 and 50, published in 2014, concluded the obesity rates ranged between 57% and 67.5% depending on where they lived. This study reflected another study published in 2009 (referenced therein) that determined the obesity rate of Palestinian men at 58.7% and Palestinian women at 71.3%.

More recently, then according to the Global Nutrition Report in 2022 which also found the prevalence of obesity is high, with 42.0% of women and 29.5% of adult men being obese. This prevalence of obesity is much higher than the regional average, with 10.3% for women and 7.5% for men being obese. https://globalnutritionreport.org/resources/nutrition-profiles/asia/western-asia/state-palestine/

== Lack of clean water ==
Due to a lack of alternative sources of water, Palestinians in Gaza have resorted to overextraction from Gaza’s sole aquifer, resulting in the salinization of much of its water. A 2009 assessment of a sample of 180 Gazan wells demonstrated that over 90 percent of them possessed chloride concentrations that were four times greater than the maximum amount suggested by the WHO. Gaza’s water supply has further been contaminated by waste water containing nitrate and pesticides, owing to a deficiency in Gazan waste water treatment capacity. A UN Environment Programme assessment of a sampling of Gazan wells demonstrated that nitrate levels in the drinking water exceeded the maximum amount suggested by the WHO by sixfold. Gaza’s waste systems are unable to effectively purify sewerage due to a scarcity of fuel and construction materials engendered by the ongoing embargo. Given their limited options, Gazans resort to drinking water deemed hazardous by the WHO for its high concentrations of salt, nitrate and other pesticides. The PNA’s Water Authority approximates that 25% of illnesses in Gaza are either directly or indirectly caused by unclean water.

In the West Bank, only 69% of the towns are reached by a water network. Of these, less than half enjoy a constant supply of water without disruption. As in Gaza, waste water is a key pollutant in the West Bank as roughly 90% of Palestinian waste water there goes unprocessed, leaving much of the water supply contaminated. Human rights groups point to an aging water infrastructure and the inequitable division of water resources between Israeli settlers and Palestinians as the principal causes of water problems. On average, each person in Gaza consumes 91 liters of water per day, which is lower than the 100 liter minimum the WHO regards as necessary to meet baseline health needs. Water consumption in the West Bank averages to only about 73 liters per day per capita, lower than in Gaza because illegal drilling is not as prevalent.

== Mental health ==
The mental health of Palestinians has been described as among the worst in the world, with over half of Palestinian adults meeting the diagnostic threshold for depression and a significant portion of Palestinian children experiencing mental distress, particularly in Gaza. This high prevalence of mental distress among the Palestinian population has been attributed to the intersection of a number of factors, including exposure to conflict, poor living conditions and restrictions on movement.

== Impact of the Israel–Hamas war ==
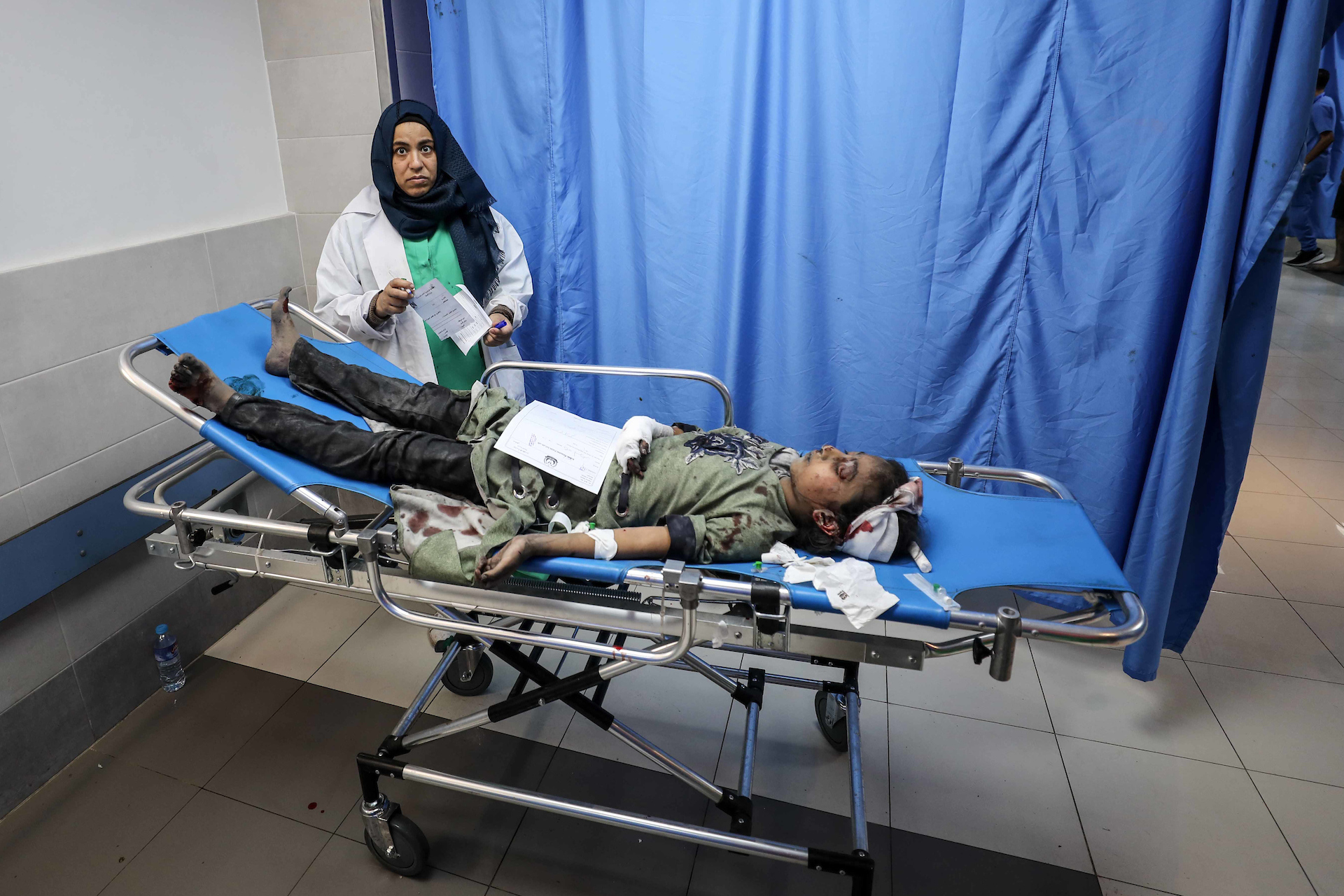
Doctor with wounded child, Al-Shifa

The healthcare system of Gaza faced several humanitarian crises as a result of the conflict. Due to Israel's siege, hospitals faced a lack of fuel and relied on backup generators for the first two weeks of the war. By 23 October, Gaza hospitals began shutting down as they ran out of fuel, starting with the Indonesia Hospital. When hospitals lost power completely, multiple premature babies in NICUs died. Numerous medical staffers were killed by Israeli airstrikes, and ambulances, health institutions, medical headquarters, and multiple hospitals were destroyed. The Medecins Sans Frontieres said scores of ambulances and medical facilities were damaged or destroyed. By late-October, the Gaza Health Ministry stated the healthcare system had "totally collapsed".

By 5 January 2024, the World Health Organization reported there had been 304 attacks on healthcare facilities in Gaza since 7 October, with 606 deaths. On 24 January, WHO stated seven out of 24 hospitals remained partially operational in Northern Gaza, and seven out of 12 in Southern Gaza. On 26 January, a senior OHCHR official stated, "I fear that many more civilians will die. The continued attacks on specially protected facilities, such as hospitals, will kill civilians". The same day, a Doctors Without Borders coordinator stated, "There is no longer a healthcare system in Gaza." A senior technical adviser with the International Rescue Committee stated, "There’s nothing that could have prepared me for the horrors that I saw." In May 2024, the UN Development Programme stated the conflict could reduce levels of health back to 1980 levels.

== Sources ==
- Baker, Graeme (13 November 2023). "Israel Gaza: Hospitals caught on front line of war". BBC News. Archived from the original on 28 February 2024.
- Basu, Brishti (1 November 2023). "Dwindling supplies, damaged hospitals in Gaza prompt growing calls for aid, ceasefire". CBC. Archived from the original on 5 February 2024.
- Debre, Isabel (11 November 2023). "Hospitals have special protection under the rules of war. Why are they in the crosshairs in Gaza?". Associated Press. Archived from the original on 23 February 2024.
- Kekatos, Mary; Beaule, Victoria (10 November 2023). "Hospitals in Gaza say they are under attack and running out of fuel for ICU patients". ABC News. Archived from the original on 1 March 2024.
- Picheta, Rob; Khadder, Kareem; Rebane, Teele; Zabadne, Zohair (10 November 2023). "Gaza hospital 'surrounded by tanks' as other healthcare facilities say they've been damaged by Israeli strikes". CNN. Archived from the original on 13 January 2024.
- Romo, Vanessa (16 November 2023). "Doctors are among the many dead in Gaza. These are their stories". NPR. Archived from the original on 27 February 2024.
- Sabry, Muhammed (24 October 2023). "Gaza hospitals in 'total collapse,' says Health Ministry". Anadolu Agency. Archived from the original on 25 October 2023.
- "Mental Health in the West Bank and Gaza" (PDF). World Bank. 22 November 2022. Archived (PDF) from the original on 2 April 2024.
