= List of hospitals in Palestine =

Logo of the Palestine Red Crescent Society

This is a list of hospitals in Palestine.

== Hospitals in East Jerusalem ==
- Augusta Victoria Hospital, Jerusalem: 164 beds; Al-Quds University teaching hospital
- Makassed Hospital, Jerusalem, 250 beds (Al-Quds University teaching hospital)
- Palestine Red Crescent Society Hospital, Jerusalem (Al-Quds University teaching hospital)
- St John of Jerusalem Eye Hospital Group, Jerusalem: Specialist eye hospital and ophthalmic teaching hospital
- St. Joseph's Hospital, Jerusalem

== Hospitals in the West Bank ==
- Al Ahli Hospital, Hebron, West Bank: 250 beds; Al-Quds University teaching hospital
- Al-Hussein Governmental Hospital, Beit Jala.
- Bethlehem Psychiatric Hospital
- Palestinian Red Crescent Society Specialized Hospital, Hebron
- Al-Istishari Arab Hospital, Ramallah, 330 beds.
- Al-Meezan Specialized Hospital, Hebron: Al-Quds University teaching hospital
- Bethlehem Arab Society for Rehabilitation, Bethlehem: Al-Quds University teaching hospital
- Bethlehem Hospital for Psychiatric and Psychological, Bethlehem: Al-Quds University teaching hospital
- Ibn Sina Specialized Hospital, Jenin
- Dura Governmental Hospital , Dura, Hebron
- Jericho Governmental Hospital, Jericho
- Martyr Dr. Thabet Thabet Governmental Hospital, Tulkarm
- Martyr Yasser Arafat Governmental Hospital, Salfit
- Palestine Medical Complex, Ramallah: teaching hospital for the Al-Quds University Faculty of Medicine
- Princess Alia Governmental Hospital, Hebron: Al-Quds University teaching hospital
- Saint John Eye Hospital Group, Hebron: Specialist eye hospital located in Hebron City
- Nablus:
  - Al-Ittihad Hospital
  - Al-Watani Medical Hospital
  - An-Najah National University Hospital, teaching hospital at An-Najah National University
  - Rafidia Surgical Hospital
  - St. Lukes Hospital

== Hospitals in the Gaza Strip ==
=== Health service points ===
As of 13 November 2026, the WHO-led Health Cluster dashboard listed 328 general and specialized hospitals, primary health care clinics, and ambulance centers in the Gaza Strip. Of these, 196 (60%) were functioning, including 26 fully and 170 partially. Across all 670 health service points listed in the dashboard, 47 were fully functioning, 270 were partially functioning, and 353 were non-functioning. Temporary medical points accounted for 315 of all entries (47%) and 210 of the non-functioning entries (59%).

Health service points in the Gaza Strip by type and functioning status, 13 November 2026
Type	Total tracked	Fully functioning	Partially functioning	Functioning, total	Non-functioning
Hospitals	37	2	18	20	17
Field hospitals	20	4	11	15	5
Primary health care clinics	241	23	131	154	87
Medical points	315	16	89	105	210
Mobile clinics	7	1	0	1	6
Ambulance centers	50	1	21	22	28
Total	670	47	270	317	353

=== General and specialized hospitals ===
Note: Governorates listed north to south.

==== North Gaza Governorate ====
- Al-Awda Hospital, Jabaliya damaged in 2009, occupied by Israeli forces as of December 20, 2023 — non-functioning as of 13 November 2026.
  - Beds: 67 in 2022.
  - Operating history: Inaugurated in April 1997.
- Al Karama Specialized Hospital — non-functioning as of 13 November 2026.
  - Beds: 17 in 2022.
- Beit Hanoun Hospital, Beit Hanoun — non-functioning as of 13 November 2026.
  - Site size: A site of about 2,500 m^{2} (27,000 sq ft).
  - Beds: 86 in 2022.
  - Operating history: Began emergency operations on 15 July 2006 and formally opened on 20 September 2006.
- Indonesia Hospital (Al-Mustafa Indonesian Hospital) — non-functioning as of 13 November 2026.
  - Site size: A site of about 1.6 ha (4.0 acres).
  - Beds: 185 in 2022.
  - Operating history: The Ministry of Health formally opened the hospital in December 2015, according to contemporary reporting.
- Kamal Adwan Hospital, Beit Lahiya — partially functioning as of 13 November 2026.
  - Beds: 118 in 2022.
  - Operating history: Opened in 2002. Medical Aid for Palestinians reported a suspension in September 2026.
- Sheikh Hamad Hospital for Rehabilitation and Prosthetics — partially functioning as of 13 November 2026.
  - Site size: About 12,000 m^{2} (130,000 sq ft) at the original site.
  - Beds: 100 at inauguration in 2019.
  - Operating history: Inaugurated in April 2019.

==== Gaza Governorate ====
- Al-Ahli Arab Hospital, Gaza City — partially functioning as of 13 November 2026.
  - Beds: 43 in 2022.
  - Operating history: Established in 1882.
- Al-Dorra Hospital (Mohamed Al Durrah), Gaza City — non-functioning as of 13 November 2026.
  - Beds: 83 in 2022.
  - Operating history: Opened in October 2000.
- Al Hayat Specialized Hospital — non-functioning as of 13 November 2026.
  - Beds: 72 in 2022.
- Al Helou International Hospital, Gaza City — partially functioning as of 13 November 2026.
  - Beds: 6 in 2022.
- Al-Mahdi Hospital, Gaza City
- Al-Quds Hospital, Gaza City — partially functioning as of 13 November 2026. The Palestine Red Crescent Society resumed services at the hospital on 21 March 2025.
  - Beds: 71 in 2022.
  - Operating history: The hospital was built in 2000.
- Al-Rantisi Hospital (Al-Ranteesi Al-Naser Paediatric Hospital; Al-Nasr Children’s Hospital), Gaza City — partially functioning as of 13 November 2026.
  - Beds: The ministry listed 210 beds jointly for Al-Rantisi and Al-Naser Paediatric Hospital in 2022.
  - Operating history: Partially opened on 23 April 2008 with 45 beds. The hematology and oncology department was transferred from Al-Nasr Children's Hospital when Al-Rantisi opened.
- Al-Shifa Hospital, Gaza City — partially functioning as of 13 November 2026.
  - Site size: The complex covered approximately 45,000 m^{2} (480,000 sq ft) in 2023.
  - Beds: 642 in 2022.
  - Operating history: Established in 1946.
- Al-Wafa (also written El-Wafa) Rehabilitation Hospital, Shejaiya — partially functioning as of 13 November 2026.
  - Beds: 70 in 2022.
  - Operating history: In September 2025, OCHA reported that the hospital had begun moving equipment and beds from Gaza City to Deir al-Balah.
- Assahaba Medical Complex — fully functioning as of 13 November 2026.
  - Beds: 24 in 2022.
- Cardiac and Specialized Surgery Hospital — partially functioning as of 13 November 2026.
  - Operating history: FAJR Global reported running cardiac and specialized surgery services at Public Aid Hospital from 19 January to 18 April 2026.
- Gaza Psychiatric Hospital, Gaza City — non-functioning as of 13 November 2026.
  - Operating history: Established in 1980. A 2026 service evaluation reported that the facility had been out of service since November 2023 and that a planned replacement was damaged before it opened.
- Hayfa Charity Hospital (also known as Haifa Charity Hospital) — non-functioning as of 13 November 2026.
  - Beds: 10 in 2022.
- International Ophthalmic Hospital (International Eye Hospital), Tal al-Hawa, Gaza City — the original hospital site was non-functioning as of 13 November 2026.
  - Operating history: Established as an eye centre in 2008 and moved into its hospital building in 2020. Human Rights Watch documented the destruction of the Tal al-Hawa building in October 2023. The hospital administration announced that it had reopened a centre in Jabalia refugee camp in May 2024.
- Ophthalmic Hospital (Gaza Eye Hospital), Gaza City — partially functioning as of 13 November 2026.
  - Beds: 32 in 2022.
  - Operating history: According to the Palestinian Ministry of Health, the building was constructed in 1965 as a fever hospital and converted to a government eye hospital in 1972.
- Patients' Friends Association Hospital, Gaza City — partially functioning as of 13 November 2026.
  - Beds: 19 in 2022.
  - Operating history: Its predecessor medical services center was established in 1980.
- Public Aid Hospital — partially functioning as of 13 November 2026.
- St John of Jerusalem Eye Hospital, Gaza: Specialist eye hospital and ophthalmic teaching hospital — partially functioning as of 13 November 2026.
  - Operating history: The Gaza service opened in 1992 and expanded its surgical capacity with a new facility in 2016. The Gaza hospital site reopened after renovations on 10 May 2025. In October 2026, the Al-Ameen Organization reported that its team had begun eye examinations at the hospital.
- Turkish-Palestinian Friendship Hospital, Al-Mughraqa — non-functioning as of 13 November 2026. The hospital went out of service in November 2023 after sustaining significant damage and running out of fuel. Israeli forces attacked the site on 21 March 2025. A comparison of satellite images published by New Lines Magazine found that the southern building had been struck and much of the hospital complex remained standing after the attack. In June 2026, OCHA reported that rubble clearance was underway and that the Ministry of Health planned to resume day care and chemotherapy after rehabilitation.
  - Site size: Approximately 33,400 m^{2} (360,000 sq ft) of indoor space as built.
  - Beds: 205 in 2022.
  - Operating history: Began operating in March 2020.

==== Deir al-Balah Governorate ====
- Al-Aqsa Hospital (Shuhada Al-Aqsa Hospital; Al-Aqsa Martyrs Hospital), Deir Al-Balah— partially functioning as of 13 November 2026.
  - Site size: About 4,000 m^{2} (43,000 sq ft) at establishment.
  - Beds: 274 in 2022.
  - Operating history: Established in 2001.
- Al-Awda Hospital, Nuseirat — partially functioning as of 13 November 2026.
  - Beds: 33 in the Ministry of Health's 2022 report. Its operator reported 52 beds in 2024.
  - Operating history: Established as a hospital in 2022 at a health centre that had served Nuseirat since 1989.
- Yafa Hospital (listed as Yaffa Hospital in the Health Cluster dashboard) — partially functioning as of 13 November 2026.
  - Beds: 5 in 2022.
  - Operating history: Established as a medical centre in 2002.

==== Khan Younis Governorate ====
- Algerian Hospital, Abasan (Algerian Military Hospital; Al-Karama Military Hospital) — non-functioning as of 13 November 2026.
  - Beds: 12 in 2022.
- Al-Amal Hospital — partially functioning as of 13 November 2026.
  - Beds: 45 in 2022.
  - Operating history: Inaugurated in 1997.
- Al-Khair Hospital — fully functioning as of 13 November 2026.
  - Beds: 18 in 2022.
- Dar-Essalaam Hospital (Dar Al Salam), specialized hospital — non-functioning as of 13 November 2026.
  - Beds: 21 in 2022.
- European Hospital — non-functioning as of 13 November 2026.
  - Site size: A site of about 65,000 m^{2} (700,000 sq ft) at the time of construction.
  - Beds: 308 in 2022.
  - Operating history: Admitted its first patient on 15 October 2000. OCHA reported it went out of service on 15 May 2025.
- Nasser Hospital — partially functioning as of 13 November 2026.
  - Site size: The medical complex was established on a site of about 18,400 m^{2} (198,000 sq ft).
  - Beds: 424 in 2022.
  - Operating history: Established in 1960.

==== Rafah Governorate ====
- Al-Helal Emirati Hospital (Al-Helal Emirati Maternity Hospital), Rafah — non-functioning as of 13 November 2026.
  - Site size: A site of about 5,000 m^{2} (54,000 sq ft) when built.
  - Beds: 72 in 2022.
  - Operating history: Formally opened on 8 October 2006.
- Kuwait Hospital, Rafah — non-functioning as of 13 November 2026. The hospital was evacuated in May 2024. Its operator established a field hospital in Al-Mawasi, Khan Younis.
  - Beds: 13 in 2022.
  - Operating history: Established in 2007.
- Mohammed Yousef El-Najar Hospital, Rafah — non-functioning as of 13 November 2026.
  - Site size: About 4,000 m^{2} (43,000 sq ft) at establishment.
  - Beds: 109 in 2022.
  - Operating history: Converted from a primary care clinic to an emergency hospital on 25 October 2000.

=== Field hospitals ===
Note: Governorates listed north to south. The following list includes former field hospital sites.

==== North Gaza Governorate ====
- Jabalia Field Hospital — fully functioning as of 13 November 2026.
- MSF-France field hospital (North Gaza) — non-functioning as of 13 November 2026.
- Palestine Red Crescent Society (PRCS) North Field Hospital — partially functioning as of 13 November 2026.

==== Gaza Governorate ====
- Al-Saraya Field Hospital, Gaza City (Palestine Red Crescent Society - PRCS) — partially functioning as of 13 November 2026.
  - Beds: 70 at opening.
  - Operating history: Opened on 21 February 2025.
- International Medical Corps (IMC) Gaza City Field Hospital — fully functioning as of 13 November 2026.
  - Site size: About 116,000 sq ft (10,800 m^{2}), according to IMC's two-year report.
  - Beds: IMC reported capacity for 200.
  - Operating history: IMC dates the opening to November 2025.
- Jordanian field hospital (Tal Al-Hawa), Gaza City. The Jordan News Agency reported that the hospital resumed receiving patients on 8 June 2026.
  - Operating history: The northern Jordanian field hospital was established in 2009. The Tal Al-Hawa facility resumed receiving patients on 8 June 2026.

==== Deir al-Balah Governorate ====
- International Medical Corps (IMC) Al-Zawaida Field Hospital — fully functioning per Health Cluster as of 13 November 2026. IMC reported that it converted the facility to a mental health services centre in August 2026.
  - Site size: About 92,500 sq ft (8,590 m^{2}) during its field hospital phase, according to IMC.
  - Beds: 75 before its conversion into a mental health centre.
  - Operating history: Opened on 15 July 2024. It reopened in March 2025 after IMC consolidated services during the ceasefire. IMC converted the site into a mental health centre in August 2026.
- International Medical Corps (IMC) Deir al-Balah Field Hospital — fully functioning as of 13 November 2026.
  - Site size: About 68,000 sq ft (6,320 m^{2}), according to IMC's two-year report.
  - Beds: 50 at opening. IMC's two-year report listed capacity for 160.
  - Operating history: Opened on 8 May 2024. IMC merged operations from its relocated Rafah hospital into this site in June 2024.
- Médecins Sans Frontières (MSF) and Ministry of Health Al-Zawaida Field Hospital — partially functioning as of 13 November 2026.
  - Beds: Expanded to 110 in June 2025.
  - Operating history: Opened in late August 2024.
- Médecins Sans Frontières (MSF) Modular Field Hospital, Deir al-Balah — partially functioning as of 13 November 2026.
  - Operating history: Documented in operation in 2024.

==== Khan Younis Governorate ====
- Al-Mawasi Field Hospital (Palestine Red Crescent Society - PRCS) — partially functioning as of 13 November 2026.
  - Beds: 60 when the opening was reported in June 2025.
  - Operating history: Documented launch of operations in June 2025.
- Jordanian Military Field Hospital, Khan Younis — partially functioning as of 13 November 2026.
  - Beds: Capacity for 41 at deployment in November 2023.
  - Operating history: Established in November 2023.
- Kuwait Specialty Field Hospital (in partnership with HEAL Palestine), Al-Mawasi — partially functioning as of 13 November 2026 per the WHO-led Health Cluster. However, HEAL Palestine's Q3 2026 report describes Kuwait Specialty Field Hospital as fully operational during that quarter.
  - Site size: A site of approximately 6,000 m^{2} (65,000 sq ft).
  - Operating history: Opened on 10 June 2024.
- Rehabilitation Field Hospital (Palestine Red Crescent Society - PRCS)— partially functioning as of 13 November 2026.
  - Beds: Initial capacity of 100.
  - Operating history: The PRCS announced its opening on 2 December 2025.
- UK-Med Field Hospital, Al-Mawasi— partially functioning as of 13 November 2026.
  - Operating history: Documented in operation by June 2024.

==== Rafah Governorate ====
- Al-Quds Field Hospital (Palestine Red Crescent Society - PRCS) — non-functioning as of 13 November 2026.
  - Operating history: By July 2025, the PRCS reported that the unit had moved from Khan Younis to Rafah and was out of service.
- Emirati Field Hospital — partially functioning as of 13 November 2026.
  - Beds: Capacity for more than 150 at launch, according to the UAE Ministry of Foreign Affairs.
  - Operating history: Launched in December 2023.
- International Medical Corps (IMC) Rafah Field Hospital (Mirage site) — non-functioning as of 13 November 2026. The hospital opened in January 2024 and relocated to Al-Mawasi in April 2024. On 3 June 2024, IMC merged its operations with those of its field hospital in Deir al-Balah.
  - Beds: 50 at opening, later expanded to 150 at the Mirage site.
  - Operating history: Opened at Mirage on 6 January 2024 and moved to Al-Mawasi in April. Its operations merged with the Deir al-Balah field hospital on 3 June 2024.
- Ministry of Health Field Hospital 2 — non-functioning as of 13 November 2026.
- Rafah Indonesian Field Hospital — non-functioning as of 13 November 2026. The hospital closed in May 2024 after Médecins Sans Frontières suspended its work there and the Ministry of Health moved its activities elsewhere during the Israeli offensive in Rafah.
  - Beds: MSF reported 30 beds for its clinic at the hospital in 2023.
  - Operating history: MSF began providing care at this site in December 2023. The hospital closed in May 2024.
- Red Cross Field Hospital (ICRC) — partially functioning as of 13 November 2026.
  - Site size: A site of about 2,400 m^{2} (26,000 sq ft) in August 2024.
  - Beds: 60 in August 2024 and 72 following expansion in 2026.
  - Operating history: Opened on 9 May 2024.

== See also ==
- Palestine Red Crescent Society
- Lists of hospitals
