= Mental health in Palestine =

The mental health of Palestinians has been described as among the worst in the world, with over half of Palestinian adults meeting the diagnostic threshold for depression and a significant portion of Palestinian children experiencing mental distress, particularly in Gaza. This high prevalence of mental distress among the Palestinian population has been attributed to the intersection of a number of factors, including exposure to conflict, poor living conditions and restrictions on movement.

== Demographics ==
=== 2022 Palestinians' Psychological Conditions Survey (PPCS) ===
In 2022, a study was conducted by the World Bank Group, in collaboration with the Palestinian Central Bureau of Statistics, International Security and Development Center, and Zentrum Überleben, which aimed to understand the intersection of various factors which contribute to poor mental health among Palestinians. This has been described as the first nationally representative survey on this topic. The study was conducted on a representative sample of 5,876 Palestinian adults from Gaza and the West Bank, who were assessed using a number of questionnaires.

==== Depression ====
58% of the participants met the diagnostic threshold for depression. Among participants from Gaza, 71% met the criteria for depression, while the prevalence was 50% for participants from the West Bank, which is roughly 10 times higher than the global average. The severity of depression symptoms did not differ significantly between men and women. The prevalence of depression was strongly associated with perceived poverty.

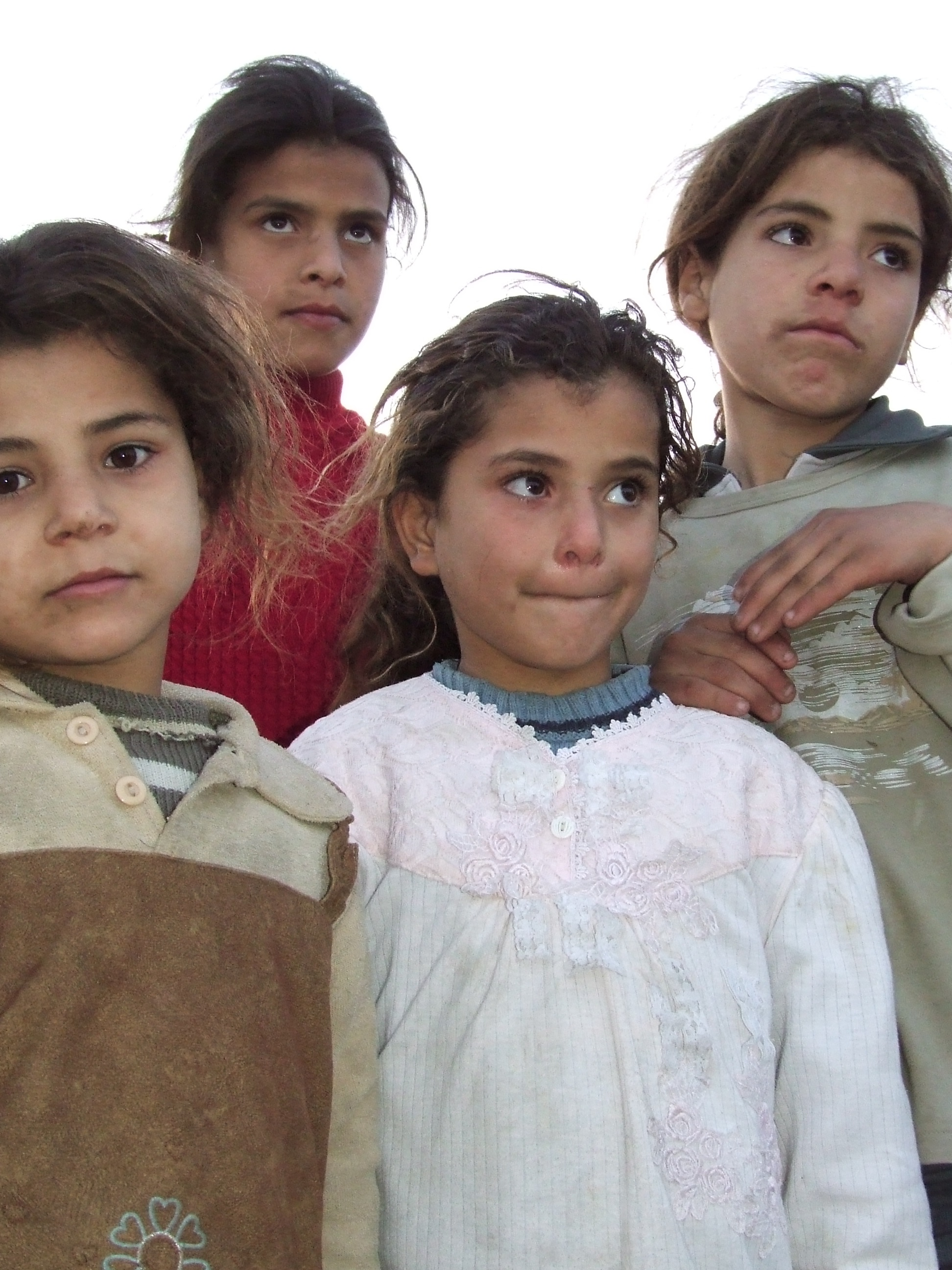
A 2022 study conducted by Save the Children among children in Gaza found that 55% of the children in their study experienced suicidal ideation.

==== Post-traumatic stress disorder ====
7% of the participants met the diagnostic criteria for PTSD, with little difference in prevalence reported between participants from Gaza and the West Bank. While this figure is lower than the prevalence obtained by previous studies, this has been attributed to previous studies conducting research in the immediate aftermath of a crisis.

=== 2022 Save the Children report ===
In 2022, Save the Children released a report titled "Trapped", which involved interviewing 488 children and 160 parents and caregivers to assess the impact which the blockade of the Gaza Strip has had on the children's mental health. 80% of the children reported experiencing emotional distress, 59% reported engaging in self-harm and 55% reported experiencing suicidal ideation.

=== Gaza war ===
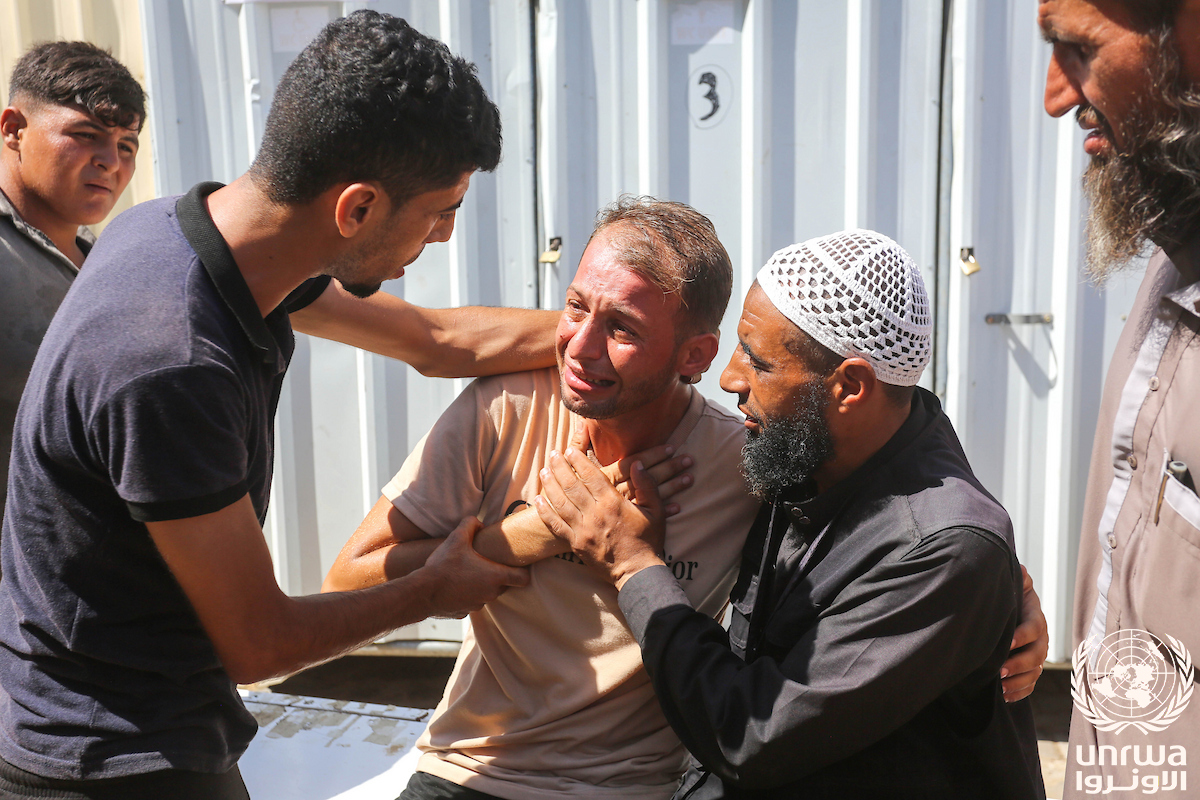
Displacement, loss, and violence brought about by the war have contributed to worsening mental health amongst Palestinians in Gaza.

Weeks of continuous air strikes and explosions have contributed to the psychological destruction of children in Gaza. Following 16 days of bombardment, children developed severe trauma, with symptoms including convulsion, aggression, bed-wetting, and nervousness. 90% of children in pediatric hospitals in Gaza exhibited or reported symptoms of anxiety, the majority exhibited post-traumatic stress symptoms, and 82% reported fears of imminent death. On 6 November, UNICEF spokesman Toby Fricker warned of the psychological impacts and "massive stress" experienced by children in Gaza. On 17 November, WHO chief Tedros Adhanom Ghebreyesus stated 20,000 people were in need of specialized mental health services. On 9 January 2024, OCHA reported 485,000 people with mental health issues were experiencing care disruption.

== Mental health services ==
=== Building Palestinian Resilience project ===
In 2016, the World Health Organization (WHO), along with the Palestinian Ministry of Health, initiated the Building Palestinian Resilience project, which involved integrating mental health into primary and secondary care, and strengthening coordination and mental health emergency preparedness. The project was funded by the European Union (EU). Almost 1,600 people were trained on the full range of mental health and psychosocial support services. The project came to an end in 2019.

== Bibliography ==
- "Mental Health in the West Bank and Gaza" (PDF). World Bank. 22 November 2022. Archived (PDF) from the original on 2 April 2024.
