= Akers =

Akers may refer to:

== People ==
- Akers (surname)

== Places ==
In the United States:

- Akers, Missouri, in Shannon County
- Akers Pond in New Hampshire
- Akers, Louisiana

== Other uses ==
- Akers' clasp, for removable partial dentures

== See also ==
- Aker (disambiguation)
- Acker
- Ackers
