= Acker =

Acker is a surname from German or Old English, meaning "field". It is related to the word "acre" and is the root of the surname Ackerman.

People with this surname include:

- Alex Acker (born 1983), American basketball player
- Amy Acker (born 1976), American actress
- Bill Acker (born 1956), American football player
- Dane Acker (born 1999), American baseball player
- Dieter Acker (1940–2006), German composer
- Duane Acker (1931–2024), American academic, president of Kansas State University
- Ed Acker (born 1929), American businessman
- Enrico Acker (born 1990), South African rugby player
- Ephraim Leister Acker (1827–1903), American politician
- Fredda Acker (1925–1980), American baseball player and beauty queen
- Hans Acker (c. 1380–1461), German stained glass artist
- Henry Acker (1804–1874 or 1875), American politician
- Isaac Acker (1821–1906), American politician from Pennsylvania
- Jackson Acker (born 2002), American football player
- Jacob Acker, 15th-century German painter
- Jean Acker (1892–1978), American actress
- Jim Acker (born 1958), American baseball player
- Joan Acker (1924–2016), American feminist sociologist
- Joel M. Acker (1815–1892), American politician from Mississippi
- Johann Heinrich Acker (1647–1719), German writer
- John Acker (Illinois politician) (1870–1933), American politician from Illinois
- John Acker (Pennsylvania politician) (1814–1904), American politician from Pennsylvania
- Jordan Acker (born 1984), American lawyer and academic administrator
- Julia Acker (1898–1942), Polish artist
- Kathy Acker (1947–1997), American writer
- Lewis Acker (c. 1817–1885), New Zealand whaler, boat builder, trader, and farmer
- Marjorie Acker Phillips (1894–1985), American painter
- Maurice Acker (born 1987), American basketball player
- Milo M. Acker (1853–1922), American politician from New York
- Shane Acker (born 1971), American filmmaker
- Sharon Acker (1935–2023), Canadian actress
- Steadham Acker (1896–1952), American aviator
- Tom Acker (1930–2021), American baseball player
- William Acker (1927–2018), American judge from Alabama
- Wolfert Acker (1667–1753), colonial American literary subject; father of Siber, Abraham and Steven

== See also ==
- Acer (disambiguation), various meanings including a surname
- Ackers, another surname
- Van Acker, another surname
