= Akers (surname) =

Akers is a surname. Notable people with the surname include:

- Alan Burt Akers, penname of Kenneth Bulmer
- Beth Akers (b. 1983), American economist
- Bill Akers (1904–1962), American Major League Baseball infielder
- Cam Akers (born 1999), American football player
- Charles W. Akers (1920–2009), American historian and educator
- Courtney Akers (fl. 2000s), British actress
- Dave Akers (fl. 1980s–2010s), videogame designer
- David Akers (born 1974), American football placekicker
- Deborah Akers, author and researcher
- Frank Akers, more than one person
- Fred Akers (1938–2020), former American football coach
- Garfield Akers, blues singer and guitarist
- George Akers, film editor
- JB Akers, American politician
- Jeran Akers (1947–2023), former mayor of Plano, Texas
- John Fellows Akers (1934–2014) President of IBM
- Karen Akers (born 1945), American actress and singer
- Landen Akers (born 1997), American football player
- Mary Ann Akers, political gossip columnist
- Michael Akers (born 1970), American film director, producer, screenwriter and editor
- Michelle Akers (born 1966), American soccer player
- Polk E. Akers, inventor of Akers' clasp
- Rob Akers (1941–2006), Australian politician and architect
- Ronald Akers (1939–2024), American criminologist
- Susan Grey Akers (1889–1984), American librarian
- Thomas Akers (born 1951), former United States astronaut
- Vic Akers (born 1946), former football player and manager
- Wallace Akers (1888–1954), British chemist and industrialist
