= Army Science Board =

Advisory committee to the United States Army

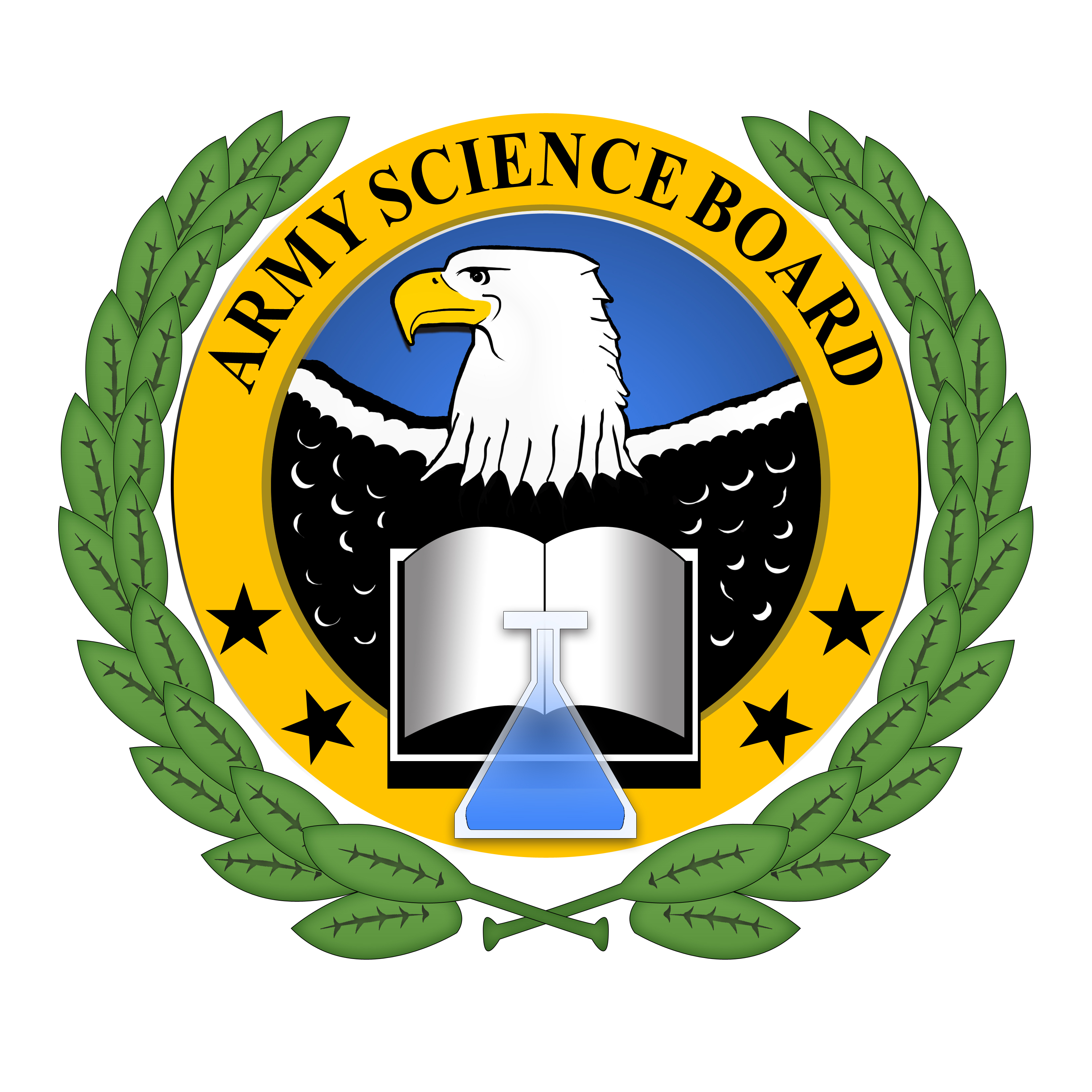
- Abbreviation: ASB
- Predecessor: Army Scientific Advisory Panel
- Formation: 16 November 1954
- Founded at: Washington, DC
- Purpose: Advises Senior Leaders on scientific matters of concern to the U.S. Army.
- Headquarters: Office of the Deputy Under Secretary of the Army (ODUSA)
- Location: The Pentagon
- Chair: Michael E. Williamson
- Staff: Ms. Heather Gerard (Executive Director)

The Army Science Board (ASB) provides advice about army science to senior military leaders. The ASB is a Federal Advisory Committee organized under the Federal Advisory Committee Act. It is the United States Department of the Army senior scientific advisory body that was chartered in 1977 to replace the Army Scientific Advisory Panel. The ASB provides the Army with independent advice and recommendations on matters relating to the Army's scientific, technological, manufacturing, logistics and business management functions, as well as other matters the Secretary of the Army deems important to the Department of the Army. The Secretary of the Army delegates oversight authority to the Deputy Under Secretary of the Army, who appoints the ASB Executive Director. Terms are generally three years.

The ASB is composed of distinguished individuals from the private sector, academia, non-DoD government agencies, and former senior military officers. Members are selected according to their preeminence in their respective fields, and are appointed to serve renewable three-year terms by the Secretary of the Army. Membership is carefully monitored to ensure that diverse disciplines and points of view are represented. The Secretary of the Army appoints the chair and vice chair from within the ASB membership. The ASB Chair also serves as a non-voting observer to the Defense Science Board. ASB membership is augmented by a small number of consultants who are appointed to provide specialized expertise for ASB studies. The board is composed of 20 voting and 20 non-voting members, each serving three-year terms, and consultants who serve one-year terms.

== History ==
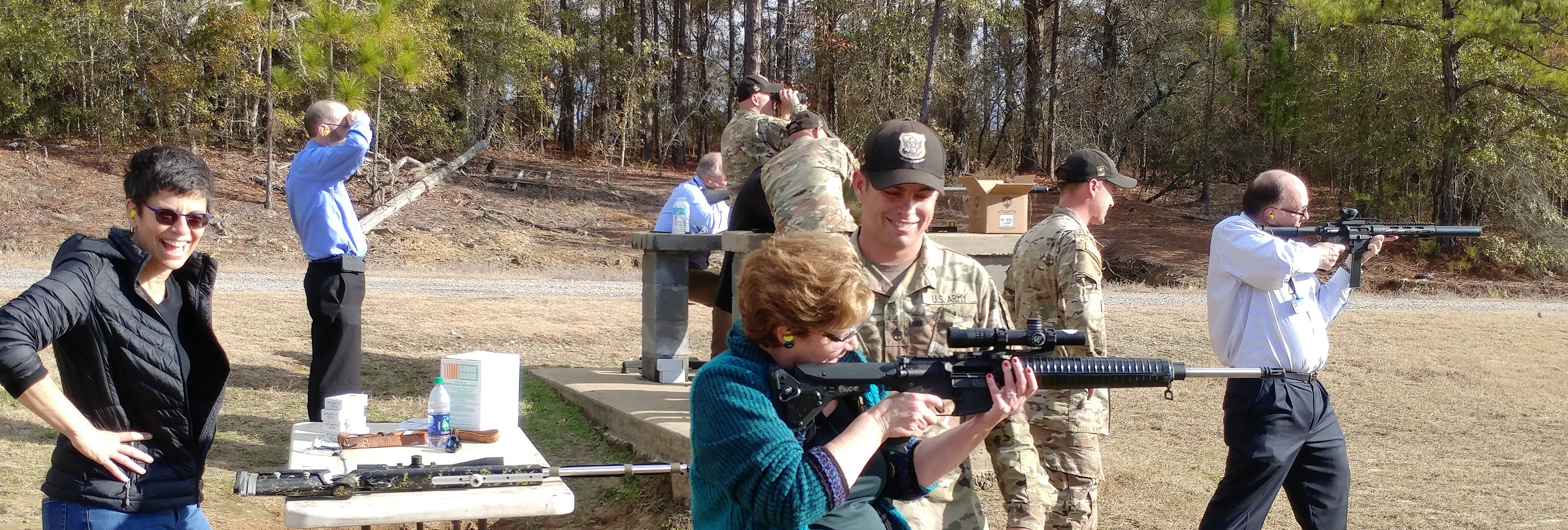
Winter Plenary: 9–11 January 2018 Board members are the Army Marksmanship Unit, Ft Benning, GA

The Army Science Board (ASB) has served as the Army's senior scientific advisory board. When it was chartered as a Federal Advisory Committee under the Federal Advisory Committee Act in 1977, the ASB replaced the Army Scientific Advisory Panel (ASAP). Both the ASAP and the ASB grew out of the need for Army-specific guidance on scientific research and development (R&D) and the Army's desire to maintain its strong technical advantage over other nations.

From the founding of the Army through the early 1900s, the Army did not have an effective R&D program — production and procurement were emphasized and the R&D during this era was limited to product improvement. Prior to World War II, the Army's R&D was controlled through the G-4 as a function of the supply arms and services. In October 1943, Secretary of War Henry Stimson indicated that he wanted scientific help in the war effort, resulting in the R&D branch's reorganization and its elevation to division level in May 1944. This elevation eliminated obstacles related to recruiting and retaining enough qualified scientific people, and provided them the clout to effectively perform their duties.

Following World War II, despite General Dwight D. Eisenhower’s warnings that using scientific and technological resources solely for procurement purposes limited the usefulness of those resources and indications that separating R&D from procurement and production would benefit the military, concerns remained that the senior Army leadership lacked the vision to effectively guide the direction of R&D programs. However, funding and personnel limitations continued to direct R&D toward the necessary areas of procurement and production. A few years later, Dr. Donald Loughridge, the Army's Senior Scientific Advisor, was concerned that the Army lacked an effective basic research program, resulting in its inability to attract desirable entry-level scientists to its laboratories. By April 1950, Secretary of the Army Gordon Gray was also concerned with the Army's R&D program and its ability to support warfighters in future wars. He did not believe that the United States could fight a war based solely upon soldiers, especially with the fall of China to communism.

Shortly thereafter, Gray's replacement, Secretary of the Army Frank Pace, evaluated the existing Army R&D program, which was then engaged in supporting the Korean War. In January 1951, the evaluators recommended that a research advisory board be established to assist the Secretary of the Army in R&D matters. Based on this report, General Joseph Collins, Army Chief of Staff, recommended establishing an Army Scientific Advisory Committee as this research advisory board. By March, Pace approved establishing this board in principle and in November he took the first steps to obtain this scientific advice. Without formally establishing a committee, the secretary appointed 10 outstanding scientists and industrialists as his scientific advisers. These pioneer advisers were:

- Dr. Detlev Bronk, National Academy of Sciences President, 1950 to 1962, and Johns Hopkins University President, 1949 to 1953. He was credited with formulating the modern theory of biophysics.
- Mr. Crawford Greenewalt, DuPont President, 1948 to 1962. He was instrumental in transforming the theoretical work into a production system capable of manufacturing sufficient plutonium for the Manhattan Project.
- Mr. Robert Haslam, consultant and as Chief of Division 3, Rocket Ordnance Research, National Defense Research Committee.
- Mr. Kaufman Keller, Chrysle board of directors member of W.R. Grace & Co.; retired Standard Oil Co. Vice President. Previously, he was a professor of chemical engineering at the Massachusetts Institute of Technology (MIT).
- Dr. Frederick Hovde, Purdue University president, 1946 to 1971. During World War II, he was chairman of the board, 1950 to 1956; Chrysler President, 1935 to 1950.
- Dr. James R. Killian Jr., MIT president, 1948 to 1959; MIT Corp. Chairman, 1959 to 1971. Following his service on this board, he became the presidential science advisor to President Dwight D. Eisenhower from 1957 to 1959.
- Dr. Charles Lauritsen, Danish-born physicist and professor of electrical and radio engineering at the California Institute of Technology, 1911 to 1962. During World War II, his nuclear physics research was instrumental in the Manhattan Project.
- Dr. Murrough O'Brien, University of California's College of Engineering dean, 1943 to 1959. Previously, he was the university's mechanical engineering department chair, 1937 to 1943.
- Dr. William Shockley, Bell Telephone Laboratories Research Physicist, 1945 to 1954. During World War II, he was the Anti-Submarine Warfare Operations Research Group research director. He received the Nobel Prize in physics in 1956 for his role in developing the transistor.
- Mr. William Webster, New England Electric System Executive Vice President and director. Following World War II, he was deputy to the Secretary of Defense on Atomic Energy and the chairman of the Military Liaison Committee to the Atomic Energy Commission. In 1950, he was the DOD R&D Board chairman.

Following the Korean War, the Advisory Committee on Army Organization analyzed the Army's organization with respect to its ability to support the nation in times of war and peace. This committee praised the scientific advisory group's creation, indicating it was a significant step in bringing the best scientific ability and experience to the Army. In 1954, the House Committee on Government Operations issued a report stating that the Army's scientific advisory group was not being used effectively. Army Secretary Robert T. Stevens, Pace's successor, concurred with these recommendations and established plans to formalize the ASAP with a permanent charter, enlarge its membership and give it more latitude in its efforts.

The ASAP — then with 25 members — held its first meeting November 16–17, 1954. During the meeting, the panel heard briefings on various areas involving the Army's R&D efforts. By 1958, the panel grew to 70 members and divided itself into eight different subpanels:

- Air Mobility
- Chemical, Biological and Radiological Warfare
- Communications and Electronics
- Firepower
- Environmental Research
- Human Factors
- Surface Mobility
- Research Organization and Planning

The ASB's distinguished members also include two astronauts, three Olympians (one with a silver medal in the long jump), one U.S. Ambassador to France and a member of the first expedition team to ascend Mount Minya Konka in Eastern Tibet, China.

== Past chairs ==
Army Scientific Advisory Panel
Chair	Years
James R. Killian	1951–1956
Frederick L. Hovde	1956–1957
Richard S. Morse	1958–1959
James W. McRae	1960
Clifford C. Furnas	1960–1961
Morrough Parker O'Brien	1961–1964
Finn J. Larsen	1965
Harold M. Agnew	1966–1970
Lawrence H. O'Neill	1971–1976
Bruce A. Reese	1976–1977

Army Science Board
Chair	Years
J. Ernest Wilkins Jr.	1978–1981
Richard A. Montgomery	1981–1983
Wilson K. Talley	1983–1986
Irene C. Peden	1986–1987
Gilbert F. Decker	1987–1989
Dennis R. Horn	1989–1990
Duane A. Adams	1990–1991
James Jacobs	1991–1992
Walter B. LaBerge	1992–1995
Wilson K. Talley	1995–1996
Michael Frankel	1996–1998
Michael J. Bayer	1998–2002
Joseph V. Braddock	2002–2004
James A. Tegnelia	2004–2005
Frank H. Akers, Jr.	2005–2011
George Singley	2012–2014
James Tegnelia	2014-2017

== Past executive directors ==
Army Scientific Advisory Panel
Executive Secretary	Years
MAJ Charles H. Curtis	1954–1955
MAJ J.D. Neumann	1956–1957
LTC William N. Harris	1958–1959
LTC Paul D. MacGarvey	1960–1962
LTC Kenneth R. Bull	1963–1964
MAJ Donald E. Rosenblum	1965–1966
LTC Joseph E. Fix III	1966–1967
LTC Wayne D. Miller	1968–1969
LTC Edward E. Roderick	1969–1970
LTC James R. Fuller	1970–1971
LTC William P. Boyd	1971–1972
LTC John G. Burbules	1972–1973
LTC Aubra N. Bone	1974–1976
LTC E. F. Imler	1976- 1977

Army Science Board
Executive Directors	Years
COL Roger Mickelson	1979–1981
Ronald A. Mlinarchik (executive director)	1982–1986
COL Richard E. Entlich	1987–1988
COL Thomas E. Stalzer	1989–1990
COL Bruce Braun	1990–1991
COL Barry Levine	1991–1993
COL Herbert J. Gallagher	1993–1996
COL Leonard Gliatta	1996–2000
COL Damian Bianca	2000–2001
COL Kevin Dietrick	2001–2002
COL Jeffrey D. Willey	2002–2004
LTC Scott S. Haraburda	2004–2005
COL Heather J. Ierardi	2005–2009
Dennis R. Schmidt	2009–2010
Carolyn Nash	2010–2013
COL William McLagan	2013–2014
LTC Stephen K. Barker	2014–2016
MAJ Sean Madden	2016–2017

== Sources ==
- Hamilton, Milton H. (4 May 1988). Army Regulation 15-8: Army Science Board (PDF). Washington, DC: Department of the Army. Archived from the original on March 6, 2016.
- Haraburda, Scott S. (2006). "Army Science Board — Providing More Than 50 Years of Scientific Advice and Guidance" (PDF). Army AL&T Magazine. PB 70-06-01 (January - February - March): 70–73. Archived from the original (PDF) on 3 March 2016.
