= Ackers =

Ackers is a surname. Notable people with the surname include:

- Andy Ackers (born 1993), British rugby player
- Benjamin St John Ackers (1839–1915), British Member of Parliament (MP) for West Gloucestershire, 1885
- Gary Ackers (1939–2011), American professor of biochemistry
- Harriet Ackers, later known as Jean Acker, film actress and estranged wife of Rudolf Valentino
- Heinz Ackers, West German canoer
- James Ackers (1811–1868), British Member of Parliament (MP) for Ludlow, 1841–1847

== See also ==
- Ackers Crossing, village in parish of Moreton cum Alcumlow, Cheshire, England
- Acker, similar name
- Aker (disambiguation)
- Akers (disambiguation)
