= Åkre =

Åkre or Aakre may refer to:

== People ==
- Aakre, a list of people with the surname Aakre

== Places ==
- Åkre, Innlandet, a village in Rendalen Municipality in Innlandet county, Norway
- Åkre, Telemark, a village in Drangedal Municipality in Telemark county, Norway

== See also ==
- Åker (disambiguation)
- MV Sovetskaya Latviya, a ship that sailed under the name MS Aakre in the 1930s
