= Ackerly =

Ackerly may refer to:

- Ackerly, Texas
- Ackerly field, Nantucket airport
- Ackerly (surname)
