= Aker =

Aker may refer to:

== Places ==
- Aker, Norway, a geographic area in Oslo and a former municipality in Norway
- Vestre Aker, a district of Oslo within former Aker municipality
- Nordre Aker, a district of Oslo within former Aker municipality
- Aker Brygge, a business and entertainment area in central Oslo

== Organisations and structures ==
- Aker ASA, a company based in Oslo, Norway, including its subsidiaries
  - Aker Solutions, an engineering company (formerly Aker Kværner)
  - Aker American Shipping, a bareboat company with Aker Philadelphia Shipyard
  - Aker Drilling, an oil rig company
  - Aker Floating Production, a company engaged in ship based petroleum production
  - Aker Seafoods, a seafood company
  - Aker BioMarine, a krill harvest and processing company
- Akers mekaniske Verksted, a former shipyard in Oslo
- Aker stadion in Molde, Norway
- Aker University Hospital, a primary hospital in eastern Oslo
- Aker Yards, a European ship yard group
- Old Aker Church, a church in Oslo

== Other uses ==
- Aker (name), a surname
- Aker (angel), mentioned only in the Greek Apocalypse of Ezra
- Aker (deity), a god in ancient Egyptian mythology
- Jason Akermanis, former Australian rules footballer

== See also ==
- Acre (disambiguation)
- Åker (disambiguation)
- Akershus, Norwegian county surrounding Oslo
- Akershus Fortress, castle in central Oslo
- Acker, a surname
- Ackers
