= Frank Akers =

Frank Akers may refer to:

- Frank Peak Akers (1901–1988), American naval admiral
- Frank H. Akers Jr. (born 1944), American army general and lab director for the Oak Ridge National Laboratory
