= Ackerly (surname) =

Ackerly is a surname. Notable people with the surname include:

- Brooke Ackerly, American political scientist
- Charles Ackerly (1898–1982), American wrestler
- David Ackerly (born 1960), Australian rules footballer

== See also ==
- Acker
