= Krišjānis Valdemārs (icebreaker) =

2007 ship

History

Latvia
- Name: Krišjānis Valdemārs
- Namesake: Krišjānis Valdemārs
- Builder: Glasgow Shipyard
- Laid down: 1924
- Launched: 1925
- Commissioned: January 1926
- Fate: Sunk on 28 August 1941 by mine in the Gulf of Finland near Mohn Island near Juminda Cape.

General characteristics
- Type: Icebreaker
- Displacement: 1,932 tons
- Length: 60 m (196 ft 10 in)
- Beam: 17 m (55 ft 9 in)
- Draught: 6.7 m (22 ft 0 in)
- Propulsion: 5,200 hp (3,900 kW)
- Speed: 14.4 knots (26.7 km/h; 16.6 mph)

Krišjānis Valdemārs was an icebreaker of the Ministry of Trade and Industry of the Republic of Latvia from 1926 to 1941. It was designed to clear shipping lanes from the ice in the freezing port of Riga, but was also used for escorting the President and members of the government on foreign visits.

== Description ==
It had a tonnage of 1,932 gross register tons (GRT). The vessel 60 metres (196 ft 10 in) long with a beam of 17 metres (55 ft 9 in) and a draught of 6.7 metres (22 ft 0 in). The ship had an engine rated at 5,200 horsepower (3,900 kW). The maximum speed of the vessel in free water was 14.4 knots (26.7 km/h; 16.6 mph) and in hard, smooth ice, 3 knots (5.6 km/h; 3.5 mph).

== History ==
The ship was ordered in 1924–1925 by the Latvian government and built at Glasgow Shipyard. The icebreaker was given the name of the spiritual leader of The First Latvian National Awakening and the most prominent member of the Young Latvians movement Krišjānis Valdemārs (1825–1891). Krišjānis Valdemārs sailed on 13 January 1926 on its first voyage from the port of Riga. The first captain of the icebreaker was Kārlis Cērpe (1875–1931). After his death Captain Fricis Veidners (1883–1942) and Pēteris Maurītis (1887–?) succeeded in command. After the Soviet occupation of Latvia in 1940 the ship was nationalized. At the end of August 1941 Krišjānis Valdemārs took part in Soviet evacuation of Tallinn to Kronstadt, but struck a naval mine on 28 August and sunk. Krišjānis Valdemārs, loaded with cargo, was bombed and sunk in the Gulf of Finland by Junkers Ju 88 aircraft of Kampfgeschwader 77, Luftwaffe.

== Finding the wreck ==
In 2011, Estonian submarine archaeologist Vello Mäss was able to identify the wreck of Krišjānis Valdemārs at a depth of about 100 metres (330 ft) by submerged filming in the Gulf of Finland near Mohni Island near Juminda Cape.

== See also ==
- Latvian Mercantile Marine during World War II
