= SS Everalda =

History
- Name: (United Kingdom) Mokta (1912-1932); (Latvia) Everalda (1932-1942)
- Owner: Ženija Heinrichsons (F. Grauds, Shipping Company Limited)
- Port of registry: Riga, Latvia
- Builder: William Gray & Co. Ltd.
- Yard number: 815
- Launched: 11 October 1912
- Completed: November 1912
- Acquired: November 1912
- Maiden voyage: November 1912
- In service: November 1912
- Out of service: 29 June 1942
- Identification: Official number: 183
- Fate: Shelled and sunk

General characteristics
- Type: Cargo ship
- Tonnage: 3,950 GRT
- Length: 106.7 metres (350 ft 1 in)
- Beam: 15.2 metres (49 ft 10 in)
- Depth: 8.5 metres (27 ft 11 in)
- Installed power: 1 x 3 cyl. triple expansion engine
- Propulsion: Screw propeller
- Sail plan: Philadelphia, Pennsylvania – Cape Henry – Rio de Janeiro, Brazil
- Speed: 8 knots
- Crew: 36

SS Everalda was a Latvian Cargo ship and part of the Latvian Mercantile Marine during World War II that the German submarine U-158 shelled and sank on 23 June 1942 in the Atlantic Ocean 360 nautical miles (670 km) south south west of Bermuda while she was travelling from Philadelphia, Pennsylvania, United States to Rio de Janeiro, Brazil while carrying general cargo.

The ship was one of eight Latvian freighters who refused orders from occupation authorities to return to Soviet-occupied Latvia in 1940.

== Construction ==
Everalda was built at the William Gray & Co. Ltd. shipyard in Hartlepool, United Kingdom in 1912. Where she was launched and completed that same year. The ship was 106.7 metres (350 ft 1 in) long, had a beam of 15.2 metres (49 ft 10 in) and had a depth of 8.5 metres (27 ft 11 in). She was assessed at 3,950 GRT and had 1 x 3 cyl. triple expansion engine driving a screw propeller. The ship could reach a maximum speed of 8 knots and could generate 312 n.h.p. thanks to her 2 single boilers and 6 corrugated furnaces.

== Sinking ==
Everalda was travelling from Philadelphia, Pennsylvania, United States, to Rio de Janeiro, Brazil, carrying general cargo with a stopover at Cape Henry. At 17:45 pm on 29 June 1942, Everalda was attacked and shelled by the German submarine U-158 on her starboard beam. U-158 also attacked the bridge with machine gun fire and destroyed the ship's transmitter, so no distress signals could be sent from Everalda. Six incendiary rounds were fired from U-158's deck gun, which started small fires in hold #1 and blew away the hatches of hold #2 on board the Everalda. The chief engineer immediately stopped the engines while U-158 ceased fire for ten minutes so the crew could abandon ship in their two lifeboats.

After the evacuation, nine more rounds were fired at Everalda, hitting her amidships below the waterline on her port side. At 18:10 pm U-158 ran out of shells, yet Everalda showed no signs of sinking. So a boarding party was organised to open the bottom valves of the ship, finally sinking her by the bow at 20:00 pm. The U-boat crew captured secret codes, confidential papers, routing instructions and other important documents like a letter for the consul at Rio de Janeiro. They also took the ship's captain and the Spanish crew member Bernardo Cores Cardama as prisoners of war on board of U-158.

The remaining 34 survivors were evenly distributed between the two lifeboats, which then set sail to the northwest and were soon separated. In the afternoon of 4 July 1942, both lifeboats were spotted by a US Army bomber on an anti-submarine patrol. The bomber couldn't retrieve the survivors, but instead dropped provisions for one of the two lifeboats which was located about 30 nautical miles (56 km) east of Cape Hatteras. Shortly thereafter the USN blimp K-7 arrived and directed the patrol boat USCGC CG-466 to their position. The survivors were picked up and taken to Ocracoke, North Carolina. Two hours later, the same flying boat again dropped provisions for the remaining lifeboat and directed the patrol yacht USS Tourmaline (PY 20) to their position to pick them up as well. They were rescued and taken to Morehead City on 5 July 1942.

U-158 was sunk by two depth charges from a PBM-3C Mariner flying boat on 30 June 1942, one day after the sinking of Everalda, which killed all on board, including the two imprisoned crew members of Everalda.

== Wreck ==
The wreck of Everalda lies at (31°00′N 70°45′W).
