= Acer =

Acer often refers to:

- Acer (plant), the genus of trees and shrubs commonly known as maples
- Acer Inc., a computer company in Taiwan

Acer may also refer to:

== People ==
- David Acer (born 1970), Canadian stand-up comedian and magician
- David J. Acer (1949–1990), American dentist
- Ebru Acer (born 2002), Turkish female Paralymic table tennis player

== ACER ==
- European Union Agency for the Cooperation of Energy Regulators, an agency
- Armored Combat Engineer Robot, a military robot created by Mesa Robotics
- Australian Council for Educational Research, research organization based in Camberwell, Victoria

== See also ==
- ACerS, the American Ceramic Society
- Jude Acers (born 1944), American chess master
