= MV Sovetskaya Latviya =

1925 ship

- As Hercogs Jēkabs in 1939.

History

Norway
- Name: Childar
- Owner: Wiel & Amundsen Rederi A/S
- Builder: Kockums, Malmö, Sweden
- Launched: 25 November 1925
- Out of service: 1934
- Homeport: Halden
- Fate: Ran aground

Norway
- Name: Aakre
- Namesake: Åkre
- Owner: Rederi A/S Henneseid (Thoralf Holta)
- Acquired: 1934
- Renamed: May 1935
- Reinstated: 1935
- Fate: Sold

Latvia
- Name: Hercogs Jēkabs
- Namesake: Duke Jacob of Courland
- Owner: Apvienotā Kuģniecības Akciju Sabiedrība
- Acquired: 1939
- Renamed: 1939
- Homeport: Riga
- Fate: Nationalised by USSR

Soviet Union
- Name: Sovetskaya Latviya; Советская Латвия
- Namesake: Soviet Latvia
- Operator: Dalstroy
- Acquired: 1940
- Out of service: 1967
- Renamed: Sovetskaya Latviya (1942)
- Nickname(s): Sovlatviya
- Fate: Deleted 1967

General characteristics
- Tonnage: 4,138 gross register tons; 2,366 net register tons; 7,780 t DWT
- Length: 115 m (377 ft)
- Beam: 16 m (52 ft)
- Propulsion: 6-cylinder 4 t single acting compound; 2000 bhp diesel engines

MV Sovetskaya Latviya (Soviet Latvia, Russian: Советская Латвия) was a transport ship operated by the Dalstroy concern of the NKVD. One of its main uses was to transport prisoners as forced labour in the Kolyma camps system.

== Prior to Soviet ownership ==
The ship was originally christened Childar when launched on 25 November 1925. It was operated as a merchant vessel for several years by the Norwegian line Wiel & Amundsen Rederi A/S, based in Halden.

Childar ran aground on 4 May 1934 at the entrance to the Columbia River in the United States while en route to Cape Town, South Africa. Four seamen were killed in this incident.

The ship was eventually repaired at Porsgrunn and re-launched in May 1935 as MS Aakre by another Norwegian line, Rederi A/S Henneseid (Thoralf Holta).

In 1939, it was purchased by the Latvian United Shipping Company (Apvienotā Kuģniecības Akciju Sabiedrība), in Riga, Latvia, and renamed Hercogs Jēkabs, in honour of Duke Jacob of Courland. It was planned that she would maintain a monthly cargo service between Riga and New York City. At that time it was one of the biggest and most modern ships in Latvia as it was only second ship with diesel engine in Latvian merchant fleet. The ship was involved in transatlantic voyages from Europe to North and South America.

== In Soviet service ==
When Latvia was occupied by the Soviet Union in 1940, all merchant vessels were nationalised by the Soviet state, including Hercogs Jēkabs. Some of the ships were within the immediate control of Soviet authorities and were thereby impressed into the service of the Soviet-controlled Latvian State Sea Shipping Company. However, many Latvian-registered ships outside Soviet-controlled waters defected and turned themselves over to the control of other nations. The exception to the last rule was Hercogs Jēkabs, which even though outside the reach of Communist authorities along the coast of Chile, nonetheless attempted to sail to the USSR, despite differing opinions among the crew. A dispute about ownership and control was resolved in the favor of the USSR despite the attempts of Latvian diplomats in the West and in time the ship voyaged for Vladivostok. The ship was renamed Sovetskaya Latviya in 1942, around which time it entered service for the NKVD and Dalstroy.

It was struck from the Soviet register in 1967.

== Sources ==
- http://www.warsailors.com/freefleet/norfleeta1.html
- Bollinger, Martin J., Stalin's slave ships: Kolyma, the Gulag fleet, and the role of the West, Praeger, 2003, 217 p., ISBN 0-275-98100-2
