= Latvian Mercantile Marine during World War II =

Merchant ships that fought for the allies in WW II

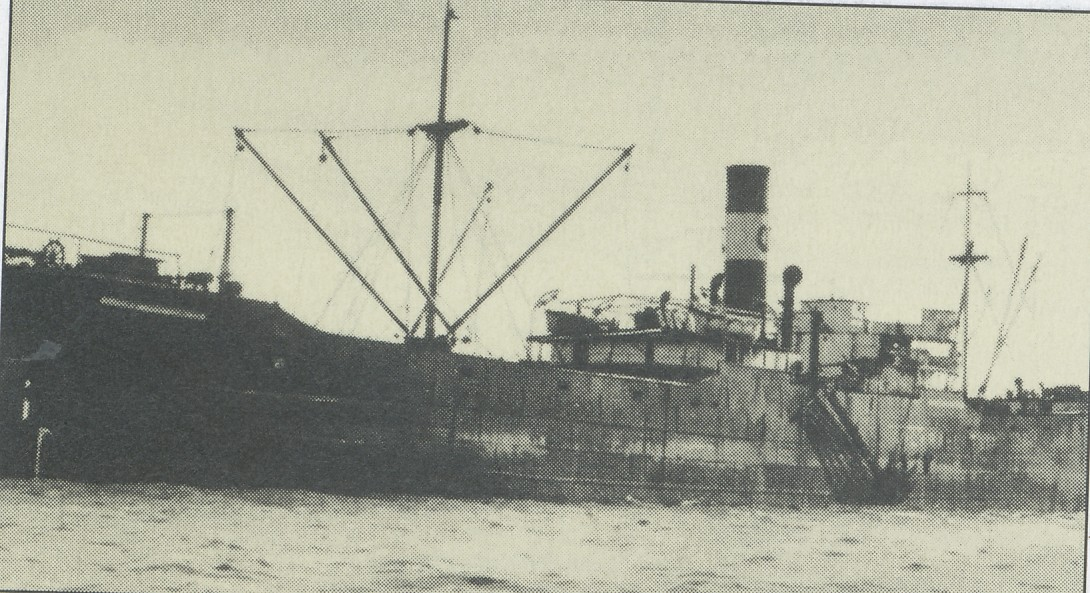
The Abgara before World War II

The part of the Latvian fleet that fought for the Allies in World War II under the flag of Latvia consisted of eight freighters: SS Abgara, Ciltvaira, Regent, SS Everasma, Everalda, Everelza, Ķegums, and Everagra. Only Everagra and Ķegums survived the war.

== Background ==
After the USSR occupied Latvia on June 17, 1940, and the country was annexed to the Soviet Union, which was not recognized by many Western nations, the Soviet authorities issued orders for Latvian merchant navy ships to return home. Some of the ships obeyed (e.g. Hercogs Jēkabs) and some of their crews were deported to Gulag labor camps. The eight ships denied the order, kept flying the Latvian flag and started to carry cargo as a part of the Allied convoys in World War II.

== Service in World War II ==
The town of Nags Head, North Carolina, USA, has a street named after Ciltvaira, which was the first Latvian ship sunk by Germans. It was torpedoed by German submarine U-123 in nearby coastal waters of Cape Hatteras on 19 January 1942. However, the ship did not sink immediately, which allowed the crew to wait for assistance from nearby ships and retrieve belongings, including the Latvian flag, with it finally sinking two days later after failed salvage operations by a Norwegian tanker and the Brazilian freighter Bury. In the end, 30 servicemen were rescued, with 2 hands lost in the explosion of the ship's boiler after the initial torpedo hit. Ashore the Latvians were greeted by locals and the press: when a reporter from The News and Courier asked if they are frightened to return to seafaring, they responded: "Hell no! Just give us weapons next time." (Latvian: "Nē, velns parāvis! Nākamajā reizē tikai iedodiet mums ieročus!"). The adrift Ciltvaira was pictured in a large photograph in Life magazine's 2 February 1942 page 13.

The same year five more ships were sunk: the Everasma on February 28 by the Italian Leonardo da Vinci with 5 hands lost, the Abgara on May 6, the Regent on June 14, the Everalda on June 29, the Everelza on August 13.

During the Battle of the Caribbean, one day before it was sunk, on February 27 the Everasma collided with a reported German U-boat. Around 8 PM the crew felt a hard push and a sound of something being dragged along the ship's belly. After 10 minutes, the captain Miķelis Pērkons saw three incoming torpedoes that missed the ship, and later, around 1/2 mile behind the ship, a periscope slowly appeared above the waterline. The crew reported that the submarine acted erratically, and slowly the periscope descended under the waves, never to be seen again. The US Navy commander of the NAF St. Lucia base, who was responsible for the area where the collision took place, confirmed that a sub was sunk by the ship.

== Aftermath ==
The Everagra, previously named Curonia from 1932 to 1939, was torpedoed on July 8, 1943, but survived and served until 1957, when, under the name of San Antonio, it was wrecked on January 6, 1957 on Mathieu Reef along the west coast of New Caledonia and later broken up in situ. Ķegums served until 1948. The surviving Latvian sailors and crew from other countries went on to serve on other ships and mostly settled in the United States.

== Commemoration ==
After reporter Aleksandrs Krasņitskijs of Chas, a Latvian Russian-language daily, and the Saturday supplement of the main newspaper of the country Diena raised awareness of the story of the merchant mariners in 2003, a memorial plaque was unveiled the same year at the building of the former Krišjānis Valdemārs Maritime School (at Krišjāņa Valdemāra 1A in Riga, today - headquarters of the Internal Security Bureau of the Ministry of the Interior of Latvia) with representatives of the Riga City Council and the Ministry of Foreign Affairs joining them. This was followed by laying commemorative wreaths at sea, which was also simultaneously done near the US coast at the site of the sinking of the Ciltvaira by reporters of The Outer Banks Sentinel and a commemoration event in Nags Head with representatives of local and state governments, as well as the United States Coast Guard.

== See also ==
- Krišjānis Valdemārs (icebreaker)
- Irish Mercantile Marine during World War II
- Nortraship
