= Van den Akker =

Van den Akker is a Dutch toponymic surname meaning "from the farmland". De(n)Akker has also been the name of many specific farms and hamlets. Variants include Van de Akker, Van den Acker and Van den Aker. Notable people with the surname include:

- Joan van den Akker (born 1984), Dutch sprinter
- John van den Akker (born 1966), Dutch racing cyclist
- Koos Van Den Akker (1939–2015), Dutch-born American fashion designer
- Laurens van den Acker (born 1965), Dutch automobile designer
- Marjan van den Akker (born 1965), Dutch computer scientist and operations researcher
- Sophie Van Den Akker (born 1990), Australian model

== See also ==
- Van Acker, a surname common in Belgium
