= Van Acker =

Van Acker a Dutch toponymic surname meaning "from (the) farmland". It is common in East Flanders and Zeelandic Flanders, while the agglutinated form Vanacker is more common in the province of West Flanders. Notable people with the surname include:

Van Acker / Vanacker

- Achille Van Acker (1898–1975), Belgian politician and Prime Minister of Belgium
- Bjarne Vanacker (1997–2017), Belgian racing cyclist
- Charles Van Acker (1912–1998), Belgian-American racecar driver
- Drew Van Acker (born 1986), American actor
- Evi Van Acker (born 1985), Belgian sailor
- Flori van Acker (1858–1940), Belgian painter, engraver, and stamp designer
- Frank Van Acker (1929–1992), Belgian politician, government minister, and mayor of Bruges
- Johannes Baptista van Acker (1794–1863), Flemish painter
- Luc van Acker (born 1961), Belgian musician, producer and label manager
- Regi Van Acker (born 1955), Belgian footballer and coach
- Thibaut Van Acker (born 1991), Belgian footballer

Van Ackere / Vanackere

- Maria van Ackere–Doolaeghe (1803–1884), Flemish writer
- Steven Vanackere (born 1964), Belgian politician, Deputy Prime Minister and Minister of Foreign Affairs

== See also ==
- Acker, surname
- Laurens van den Acker (born 1965), Dutch automobile designer
- Van den Akker, surname of similar origin common in the Netherlands
