= Acker's Cottage =

Cottage on Stewart Island / Rakiura, New Zealand

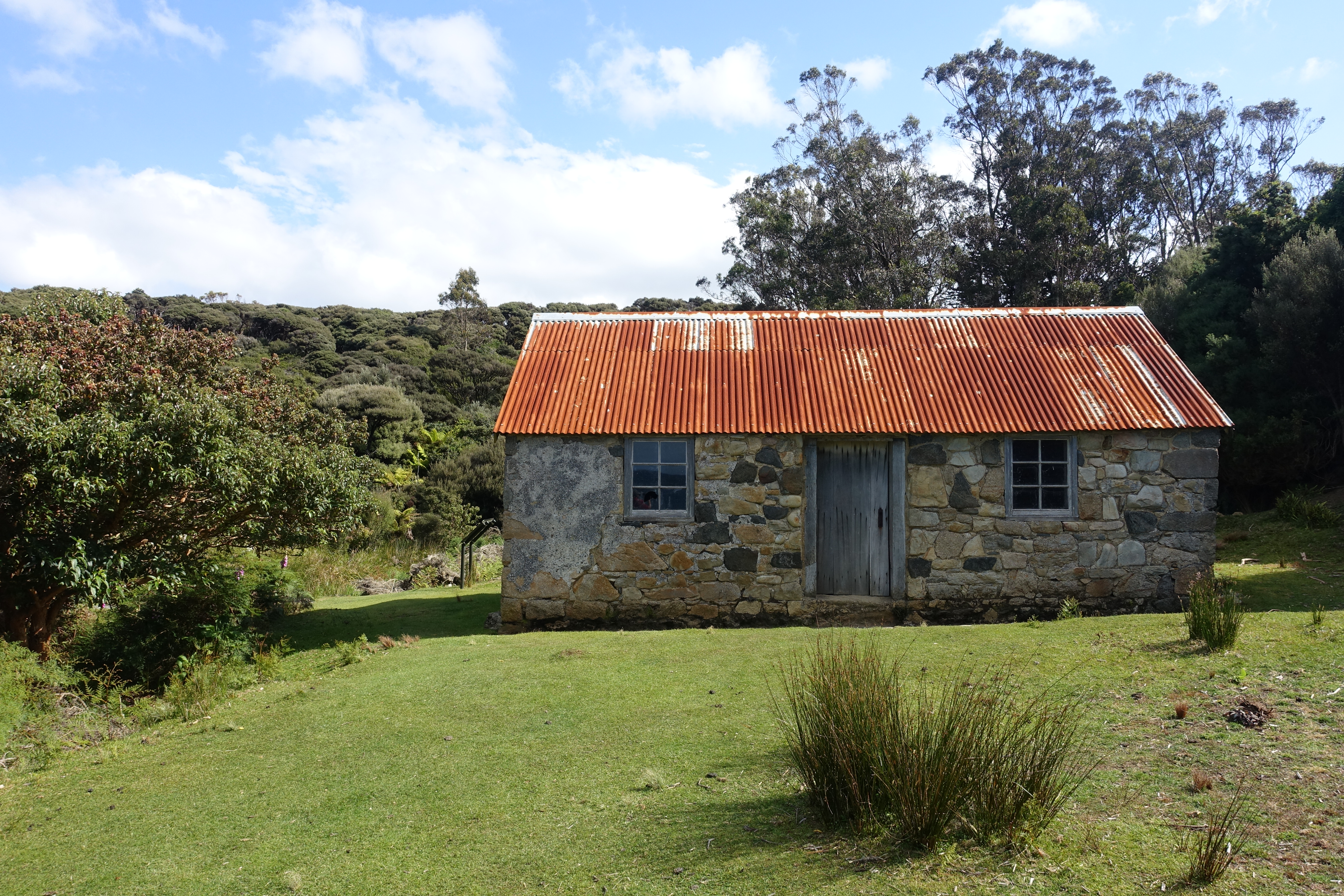

- Location within New Zealand

General information
- Architectural style: Vernacular
- Location: Leask Bay Road, Harrold Bay, Stewart Island, New Zealand
- Coordinates: 46°53′47.45″S 168°9′10.33″E
- Completed: 1835

Heritage New Zealand – Category 1
- Designated: 26 November 1987
- Reference no.: 396

Acker's Cottage is one of the first stone houses on New Zealand's Stewart Island (officially Stewart Island / Rakiura). The cottage was placed on the Heritage New Zealand list of historic places (category I) and has been restored by Heritage New Zealand and the Department of Conservation as an example of an early vernacular building. Built by Lewis Acker in 1834—35, it is the oldest whaling cottage in New Zealand and one of the earliest stone buildings on Stewart Island.

== Lewis Acker ==
Lewis Acker (c. 1817–11 July 1885) was a New Zealand whaler, boatbuilder, trader, farmer and saw miller. He was born in New York City, US. Acker married a Kāi Tahu woman, Mary Pui, and together they had nine children. After Acker retired from whaling, he built the cottage on Harrold Bay, Stewart Island. He quarried the stone at Oreti Beach and carried it across Foveaux Strait in his boat. He cleared the nearby land for cultivation in an area that is now called Acker's Point. Acker and his wife lived in this cottage until the late 1850s. Since that time it has been used as a smithy, storeroom, brewery and workshop.
