= Julia Acker =

Polish-Jewish figurative artist

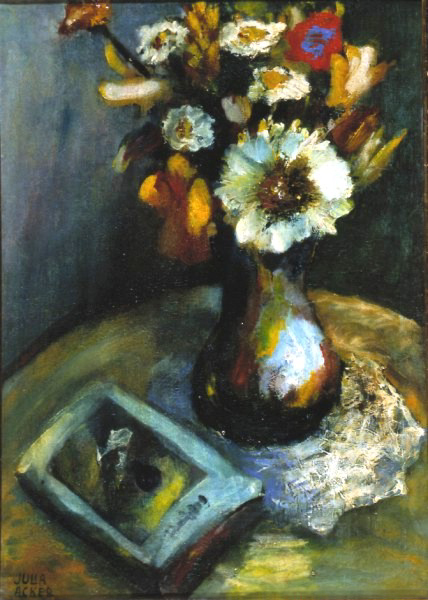
- The colors of flowers
- Born: 1898; Lemberg, Austria-Hungary
- Died: 1942 (aged 43–44); Lviv, Poland
- Known for: Painting

Julia Acker (1898–1942) was a Polish-Jewish figurative artist. Since many records from the World War II period and the German occupation of Poland are missing, the year of her birth in Lwów and death in the Lviv Ghetto are listed in the "Exhibition Catalogue from the Collections of the Lviv Art Gallery, Lviv Museum of History," section relating to "Biographies of Artists."

== Biography ==
Acker spent her entire life and career in Lviv and surrounding communities. She was born when Poland was still part of the Austrian-Hungarian Empire and Lemberg was in the Empire's Eastern Province of Galicia. She "studied painting at the Free Arts Academy of Leonard Podhorodecki and took private lessons at Pawel Gajewski in Lwów," in the new independent Poland after World War I. She continued her painting studies "at Pawel Gajewski in Lwów...and painted genre compositions as well as scenes from Jewish community life and also children's portraits, still lifes and flowers."

Due to the constant threat on her life, Acker committed suicide in 1942 at the beginning of the German occupation of Lviv and was interred in the Lviv Cemetery with cemetery data from 1941–1942 listing her "interment of 07 May 1942," and a last address of "Zolkierska 35 (Zolkiewska)," the same address, also, of Dr. Izrael Acker, listed in the 1938 Lwow telephone directory. Dr. Acker's medical practice is listed in the same directory as "Zamarstynowska Street 34".

The Polish National Museum of Art in Warsaw owns one of her paintings, titled, Procession of Figures. DESA auction house on 16 October 2004 offered Martwa Natura Z. Nasturciami oil on cardboard by Julia Acker that was painted in 1940. The Agra Art Auction House in Poland in 2010 offered "Colours of Flowers" for sale from a private collection. In the collection of the Lviv Museum of History is the Portrait of Philip Schleicher Vice President of Lviv (1870–1932), by Julia Acker that was "received in 1941."
