= Frank H. Akers Jr. =

United States Army general

Frank Herman Akers Jr.
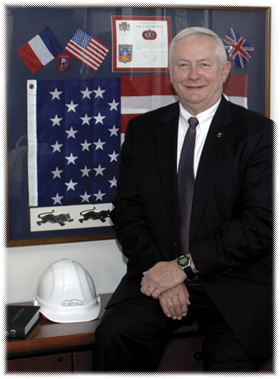
- Associate Lab Director for the ORNL (2006)
- Born: 1944 (age 81–82)
- Scientific career
- Education: US Naval Academy (BS); Duke University (PhD)
- Thesis: The Unexpected Challenge: The Creek War of 1813-1814 (1975)
- Military career
- Allegiance: United States of America
- Branch: United States Army; Infantry
- Service years: 1966–1996
- Rank: Brigadier General
- Commands: 505th Inf Regiment; 1st Bn, 504th Inf Regiment
- Conflicts: Vietnam War; Operation Urgent Fury; Desert Storm
- Awards: Dist. Svc Medal

Frank Herman Akers Jr. is an American army Brigadier General and a former associate lab director for the Oak Ridge National Laboratory. He is also the president and CEO of the Oak Ridge Strategies Group, a Service-Disabled Veteran-Owned Small Business that provides strategic-related consultation support.

== Military career ==
Frank H. Akers Jr. graduated from the United States Naval Academy in 1966, and later received a doctorate in history from Duke University in 1975. Upon graduation from the Naval Academy, he received a commission as an infantry officer for the United States Army.

During the Vietnam War, he served as a rifle platoon leader, a scout platoon leader and an assistant operations officer in the 173rd Airborne Brigade.

Throughout his 30-year military career, his assignments included serving as the assistant chief of staff for operations for 82nd Airborne Division during 1983 Invasion of Grenada as part of Operation Urgent Fury. He also commanded the 1st Battalion 504th Parachute Infantry Regiment, and later the 505th Parachute Infantry Regiment. He then went on to serve as the chief of operations for the XVIII Airborne Corps during the Gulf War. As a brigadier general, he served as the Assistant Division Commander for Operations for 25th Infantry Division.

In 1996, Frank H. Akers Jr. was nominated for promotion to major general with the assignment to command the Army Reserve Officers' Training Corps, but declined his second star to retire from the military instead. His military awards include the award of the Distinguished Service Medal.

== Civilian career ==
After retiring from the military, Frank H. Akers Jr. became an associate lab director for the Oak Ridge National Laboratory (ORNL). In 2005, he became the chairman of the Army Science Board. After he left ORNL, he became the president and CEO of Oak Ridge Strategies Group. Dr. Akers is married to Dr. Margaret "Mug" Saunders.
