= Gary Ackers =

American biochemist (1939–2011)

Gary Keith Ackers
- Born: 1939
- Died: 2011 (aged 71–72)
- Education: Johns Hopkins University (Ph.D.)
- Known for: Agarose gel chromatography
- Scientific career
- Fields: Thermodynamic linkage analysis of biological macromolecules, cooperative O_{2} binding to hemoglobin
- Workplaces: Washington University in St. Louis
- Doctoral advisor: Tom Thompson

Gary Keith Ackers (1939–2011) was Emeritus Professor of Biochemistry and Molecular Biophysics of Washington University School of Medicine.

His research focused on thermodynamic linkage analysis of biological macromolecules, addressing the molecular mechanism of cooperative O_{2} binding to human hemoglobin since the early 1970s. He was a Fellow of the Biophysical Society and one of the founders of the annual Gibbs Conference.

Ackers invented agarose gel chromatography when he was a teenager. He went on the develop analytical gel chromatography methods for determinations of many important characteristics of water-soluble proteins; diffusion coefficient, molecular size, thermodynamics of protein-protein interactions including important changes due to single amino acid substitutions.
