= Hans Acker =

German stained glass artist

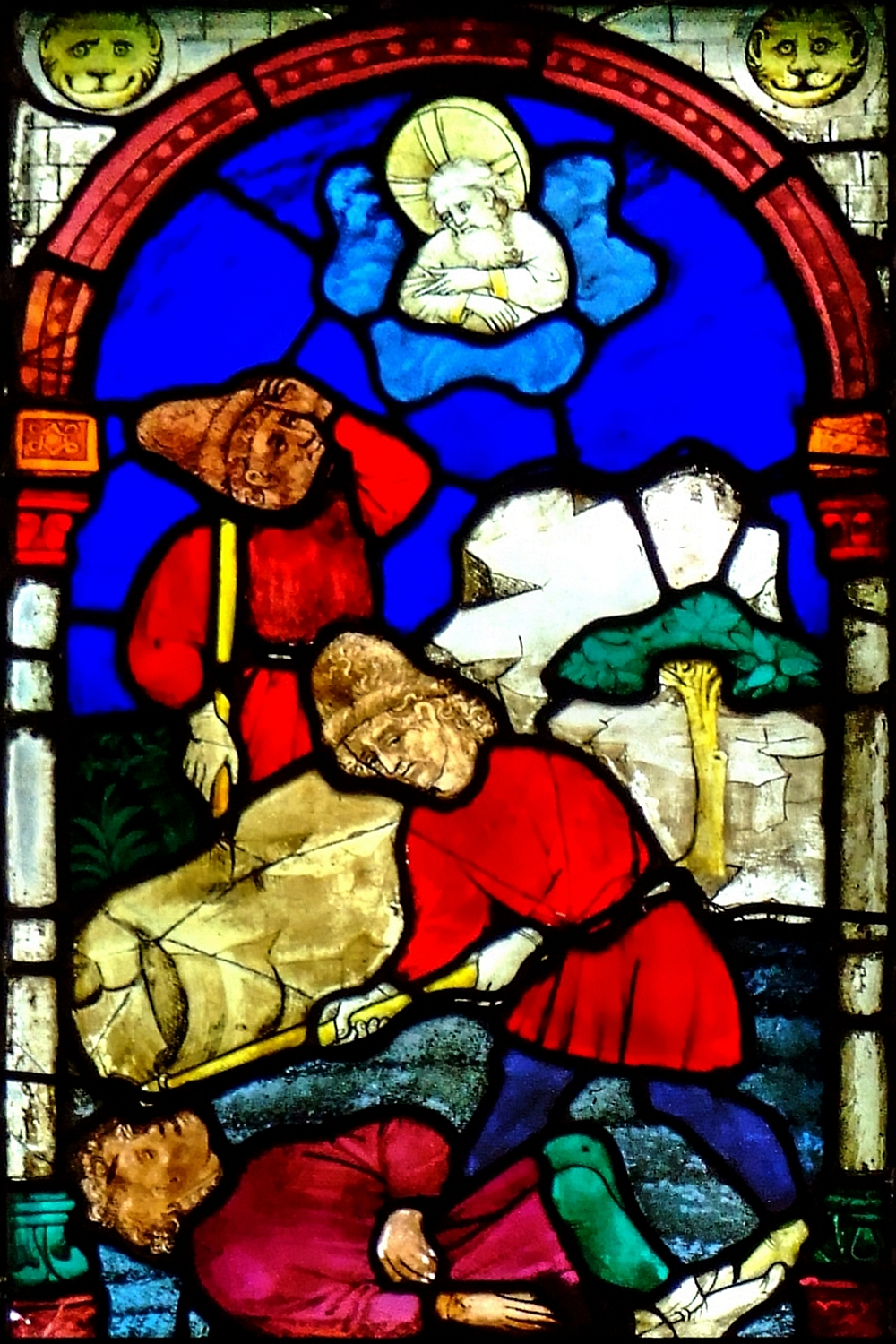
Acker, "Cain Killing Abel" at the Ulm Münster

Hans Acker (c. 1380 – 1461, Ulm) was a German stained glass artist. Members of his family also practiced the art, including Jacob Acker the Younger and Jacob the Elder. He is best known for a series of six stained glass windows, dating to the 1430s, in the Ulm Münster Lutheran church, each illustrating numerous scenes of the Bible.
