= Deborah Akers =

American academic

Deborah S. Akers is a lecturer in the Department of Anthropology at the Ohio State University. She is primarily known as an author, writing about PTSD.

Previously, she was an assistant professor of Cultural Applied Anthropology at Miami University, Ohio. She is both an author and researcher and currently has a segment with Talk Radio News, DC where she discusses her research findings on posttraumatic stress disorder (PTSD) and meditation and the benefits of Asian meditation techniques and holistic stress-free living.

== Early life ==
Akers was born in Cincinnati, Ohio, and grew up in the Midwest. She earned a bachelor's degree in Arabic, a master's degree in Middle Eastern studies and anthropology, and a doctorate in anthropology from The Ohio State University. She was one of the first students at The Ohio State University to receive her BA in Arabic. Her PhD dissertation on Saudi Arabia is entitled The Tribal Concept in Urban Saudi Arabia (2001). Akers also holds a J.D. from Capital University Law School.

== Career ==
She moved to Washington, D.C., after graduation and worked as a liaison officer with the U.S. Congress Foreign Affairs Committee on Bosnia and Iran and staff attorney and then director for oversight with the Committee on House Administration in the United States Congress for the Smithsonian and the Library of Congress. She has also spoken on the issue of human rights in front of the Congressional Caucus on Afghanistan.

=== Research ===
Among the countries where Akers has lived and conducted fieldwork are Dubai, United Arab Emirates; Jeddah, Saudi Arabia; as well as Tibetan monasteries in Dharamasala, India, and Kathmandu, Nepal. The geographical areas of her research include the Middle East (Saudi Arabia and Persian Gulf) and Central Asia (Afghanistan, Nepal and Tibet). In 1997, she was married to a Saudi national and living in Jeddah.

Her research in the Middle East since 1990 has focused on political tribal systems and political Islam in Saudi Arabia and the Persian Gulf. In her dissertation on The Tribal Concept in Urban Saudi Arabia, Akers examines the social and symbolic manifestations of clans, their psychological self-definition, and the consequences of modernization. Akers argues that understanding the clan concept as a form of group identification is essential to understanding Saudi sociocultural dynamics. She is currently conducting research in the Kingdom for her book on the social anthropology of Saudi Arabia. Akers has also co-translated into English and published short stories from the Arabian Peninsula and the Persian Gulf states, with social commentary. Among her works related to the Middle East are: My Days in Mecca (2009), Oranges in the Sun (2008), Histoires d’Arabie Saoudite (2007), and They Die Strangers (2001).

=== Field schools ===
Akers established the field school in the Tibetan refugee community in exile in northern India for her students at Miami University in the summer of 2005. Since then, she has been leading and directing field schools for groups of twenty in Dharamsala, India each summer. Here, students have an opportunity to study political issues and the non-violence doctrine espoused by the Dalai Lama. It has since become a semester long program (The Miami University Tibetan Studies Semester Program) and is associated with The Institute for Buddhist Dialectics.

Since joining Miami University, Akers has taught courses on conflict in the Islamic world, world cultures, and Tibetan approaches to non-violence. She is currently writing on the social anthropology of Saudi Arabia as well as conducting research among the Tibetan community in exile in Dharamsala, India. Her work with Tibetan tortured political prisoners in India led to the development of a study on posttraumatic stress disorder (PTSD) involving the use of Tibetan meditation techniques to treat PTSD among survivors of interpersonal abuse in Columbus, Ohio. The study is now in its second year. The first year results can be read here.
