= Åker =

Åker is the Norwegian and Swedish word for a field.

Åker may also refer to:

- Åker Ship District, an area in Uppland, Sweden
- Ridabu (also known as Åker), a village in Hamar Municipality in Innlandet county, Norway
- Jon Åker (1927–2013), Norwegian hospital director

== See also ==
- Åkre (disambiguation)
- Aker, Norway, a village in Norway
