= Beth Akers =

American economist

- Born: 1983 (age 42–43)
- Education: Columbia University
- Occupation: Economist
- Organization(s): Manhattan Institute for Policy Research; American Enterprise Institute

Elizabeth Akers (born 1983) is an American economist known for her advocacy for reform of the federal student loan and financial aid system in the United States.

== Career ==
From 2016 to 2021, Akers was a senior fellow of the Manhattan Institute for Policy Research, during which she coauthored Game of Loans: The Rhetoric and Reality of Student Debt, published in 2016. Akers was formerly an expert at the Brookings Institution, an American think tank, as well as a member of the Council of Economic Advisors under president George W. Bush. In 2021, she authored a second book, Making College Pay.

Akers has written and contributed to publications such as The Hill, Federalist Society, RealClearEducation, The Boston Globe, Education Next, U.S. News and World Report, Washington Examiner, New America, The Seattle Times, Pioneer Press, The Washington Post, and National Review. She has also given testimony for the House Committee on Education and the Workforce regarding higher education.

== Political opinions and reception ==
In her book, Akers wrote that the education financing system is simply far too complex for the average student or parent borrower to navigate well. She argues that the United States Department of Education should simplify federal financial aid, adopt a single, income-driven repayment plan for federal student loans, and bring market discipline into student lending in innovative ways.

She has stated that enrolling more student loan borrowers into a plan with more protections would be a positive for the system. She has stated she is against paycheck withholding being the only option for a loan repayment, but acknowledges that that system would have clear benefits, with automatic payments eliminating "unnecessary defaults". She stated, "The Idea that payroll withholding could be a substitute for our broken loan-servicing system is appealing..."

In 2019, under the American Enterprise Institute, Ackers published an analysis of student loans, finding a pattern of costs that continued through the decade's end. She stated:

"I think Republicans will certainly face pressure to ensure that future Democratic presidents don’t have the authority to cancel more student debt. Their constituents have often been critical of the president's efforts", said Beth Akers, senior fellow focused on higher education and student loans at the American Enterprise Institute (AEI). "But this isn't an issue that Republican leaders needed an outraged constituency to motivate them to act. The unlawful and unfair forgiving of student loans goes against the basic tenets of Republican and conservative ideology".

Akers has shown support for a financial aid reform that distributes a larger percentage of money towards students most in need of it.

== Education ==
Akers received a Bachelor of Science in mathematics and economics from University at Albany, SUNY and a Ph.D. in economics from Columbia University.
