= Leask Bay =

Small bay on Stewart Island in New Zealand

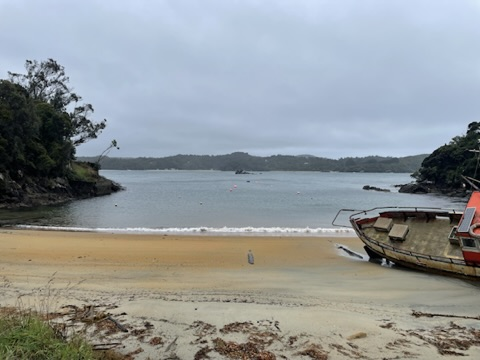
- View of Leask Bay
- Location: Stewart Island
- Coordinates: 46.898°S 168.145°E

Leask Bay is a small bay on Stewart Island, east of Oban in New Zealand.

== History ==
European settlement of Leask Bay began in the 1840s and 1850s, before Halfmoon Bay became the main point of settlement.

=== Leask Family ===
Leask Bay has been occupied by the Leask family for six or seven generations, after emigrating to Stewart Island from Orkney. The Leasks were involved in the early construction of Stewart Island infrastructure: in 1897 Thomas and James Leask built the road from Oban to Harrold Bay. The Leasks were some of the original boat builders of Stewart Island, and current descendants are still involved in the fishing industry.

== Natural environment ==
In 1933, the skull of the first recorded Shepherd's beaked whale was stored at Leask Bay, before being taken to Southland Museum.

In a 1953 publication, it was noted that Leask Bay was an outlier on Stewart Island as it hosted exotic trees when the rest of the Island has only native trees.

In the 1980s, an oil seep was discovered in Leask Bay. It is hypothesised that the oil naturally migrated from the Great South Basin into a shallow basin margin in Leask Bay.

The Polynesian rat (kiore) is largely not found on the New Zealand mainland, but have been found at Leask Bay.

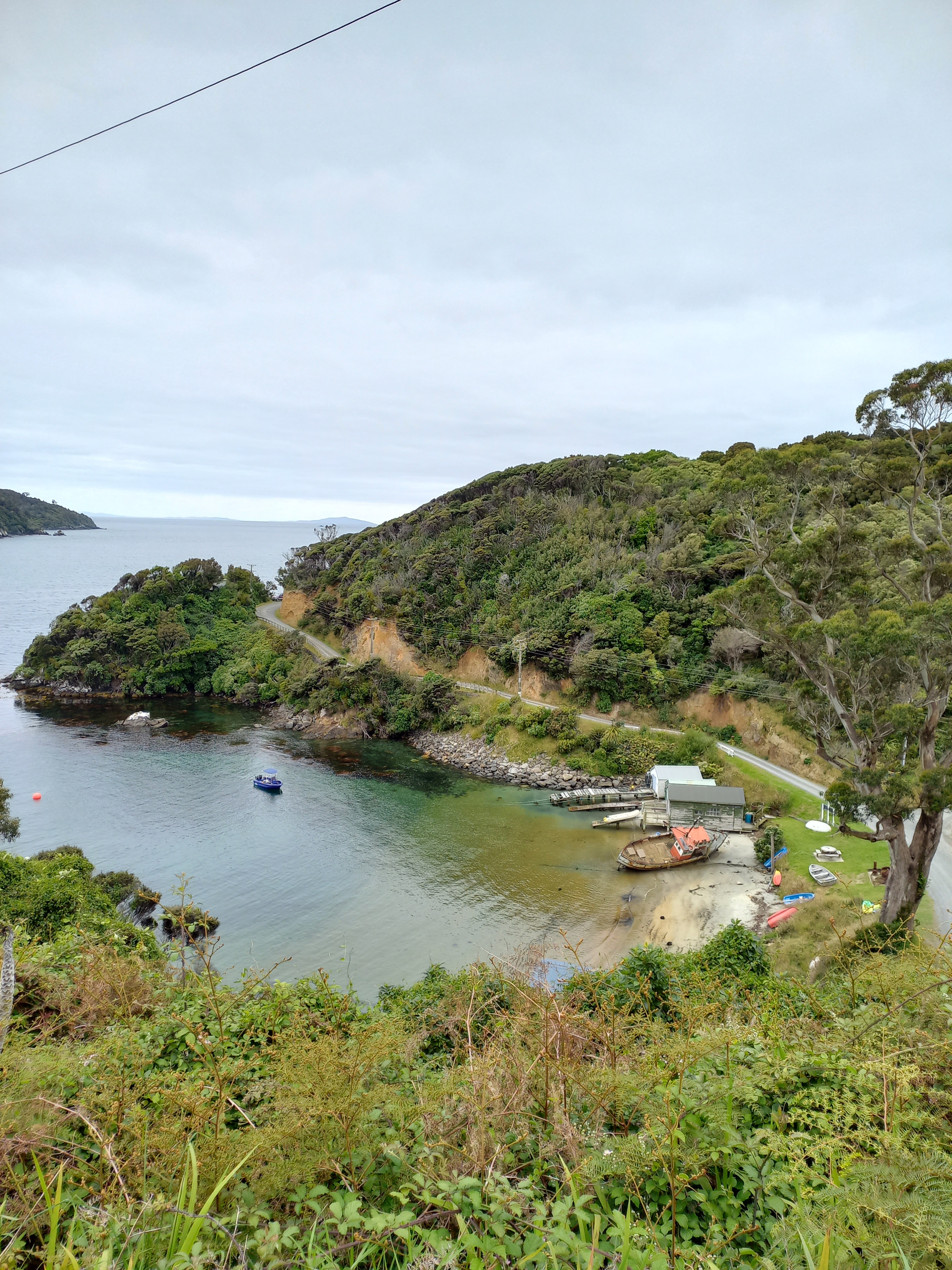
View of Leask Bay
