= Steadham Acker =

Steadham N. Acker
- Born: March 31, 1896; Talladega, Alabama, US
- Died: October 22, 1952 (aged 56); Jefferson, Alabama, US
- Education: University of Alabama, B.S. in Civil Engineering
- Political party: Democratic
- Spouse: Grace Fruitticher
- Children: 2

Steadham N. Acker (March 31, 1896 – October 22, 1952) was an American pioneer aviator before World War I and a United States Naval Aviator during World War I.

== Early life ==
He was born on March 31, 1896, in Gadsden, Alabama, to William H. Acker.

He graduated from the University of Alabama's College of Engineering with a Bachelor of Science degree.

== Career ==
He was a member of the Early Birds of Aviation, a small group of pilots that flew before World War I. Acker's first flight and parachute jump was made in 1914 when he was 18, and used a balloon, rather than a powered aircraft.

He served as a United States Naval Aviator with the rank of lieutenant from 1918 to 1919. During his service, he organized the first night flying unit for the Navy.

He was the general manager of the Birmingham Municipal Airport and founded the Birmingham Aero Club on 31 January 1932. Acker and Rountree founded and managed the National Air Carnival, an annual Birmingham based airshow. In 1946 Acker became the director for the National Aviation Clinic in Oklahoma City and ran the Omaha airshow.

== Death and legacy ==
He died October 22, 1952, in Jefferson, Alabama, at age 56.

He was inducted in the Alabama Aviation Hall of Fame in 1984.
