= Jude Acers =

American chess player (born 1944)

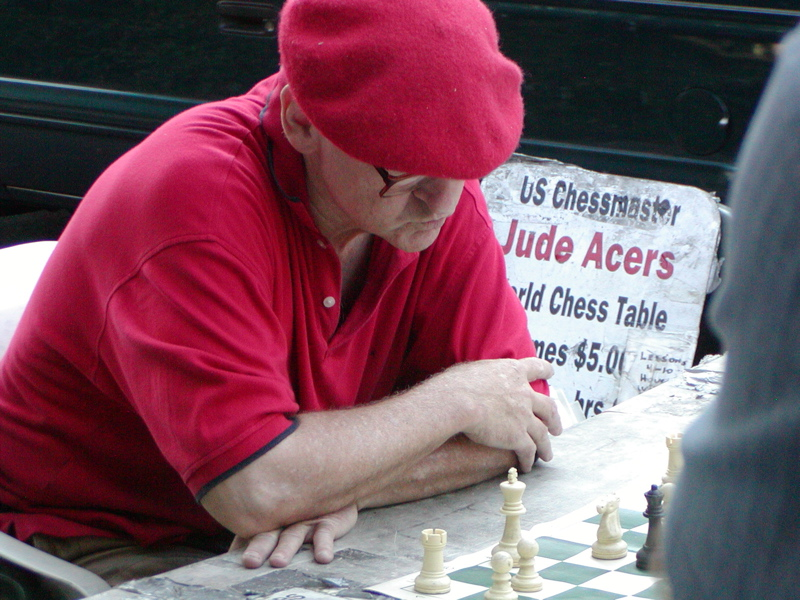
- Acers in 2005

Personal information
- Born: Jude Frazier Acers; April 6, 1944 (age 82) Long Beach, California, US

Chess career
- Country: United States
- Title: Candidate Master (2022)
- Peak rating: 2241 (January 2011)

Jude Frazier Acers (born April 6, 1944, in Long Beach, California) is an American chess player.

== Early life ==
Acers spent much of his childhood in an orphanage. His father was a U.S. Marine and was away a lot and his mother struggled with mental illness. When he was five, he saw a book about chess and started playing. His father returned when he was an adolescent and took him from the North Carolina orphanage to New Orleans. His father was abusive, and committed Acers at the age of 14 to Louisiana's state mental institution in Mandeville. At 17, Acers was already rated as a master by the United States Chess Federation. The state of Louisiana provided funding for his bachelor's degree in Russian from Louisiana State University. He subsequently spent some time living in San Francisco, where he was at one point room-mates with Janis Joplin.

== Career ==
Acers is best known for playing against all comers in a New Orleans downtown gazebo while wearing a red beret. A longtime resident of Louisiana, he claims to have been the first New Orleans native chess master of comparable strength since Paul Morphy.

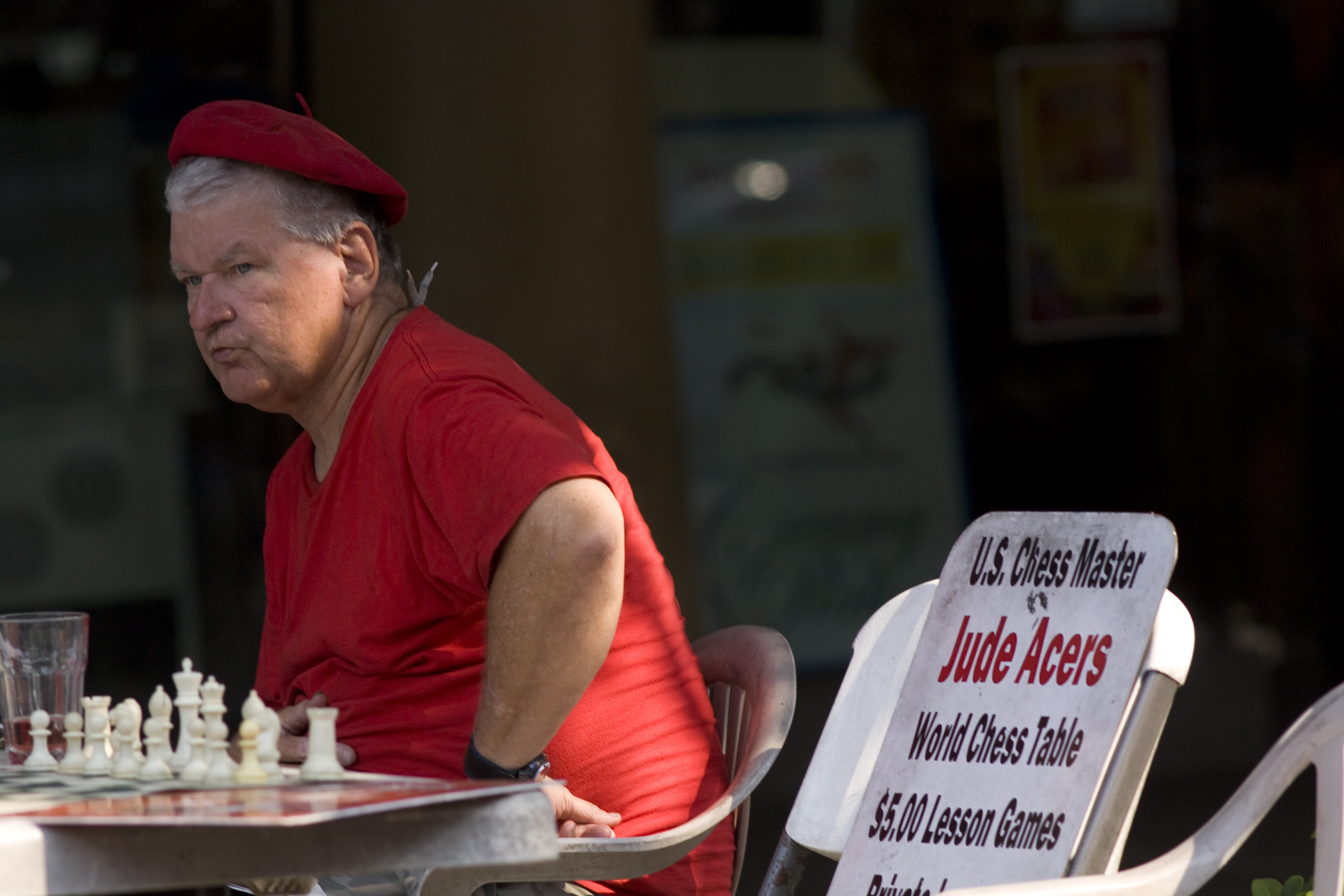
Acers in the French Quarter in 2011

He is also known for being a great showman, touring the country giving simultaneous chess exhibitions. He was twice the world record holder of having played the most opponents in a simultaneous exhibition. First against 117 opponents (1974, Lloyd Center, Portland, Oregon), then against 179 opponents (1976, Mid Island Plaza, Long Island, New York). The records were certified by the Guinness Book of World Records.

Acers barely survived Hurricane Katrina and lived in a displaced persons camp for some time. As the city recovered, he returned to New Orleans and resumed his customary chess table in the French Quarter.

=== Playing strength ===
In September 2007, Acers defeated Bill Hook in the first round of the World Senior Championship held in Gmunden, Austria. Acers' result at the 17th World Senior Chess Championship received a FIDE performance rating of 2289. His current Fide Rating is 2229.

=== Author/writer ===
Acers has written or contributed to several chess books. Since 2008, he has been working on The Road which will be a book about his chess tours. He has annotated many American master-level games, along with Louis Ciamarra, for the Yugoslav-published series Chess Informant.

=== Documentary ===
In 2023, Acers was the subject of the documentary The Man in the Red Beret, directed by Derek Bridges. The film chronicles Acers's life and decades as a chess fixture in New Orleans' French Quarter.

== Books ==
The Italian Gambit (and) A Guiding Repertoire For White – E4! ISBN 1-55369-604-2
