= Ronald Akers =

American university teacher (1939–2024)

- Born: Ronald Louis Akers; January 7, 1939; New Albany, Indiana, U.S.
- Died: October 19, 2024 (aged 85); Gainesville, Florida, U.S.
- Education: Indiana State University (B.S., 1960), Kent State University (M.A., 1961), University of Kentucky (Ph.D., 1966)
- Known for: Work on social learning theory and crime
- Awards: 1988 Edwin H. Sutherland Award from the American Society of Criminology
- Scientific career
- Fields: Criminology
- Workplaces: University of Washington (1965–1972), Florida State University (1972–4), University of Iowa (1974–80), University of Florida
- Thesis: Professional organization, political power, and occupational laws (1966)

Ronald Louis Akers (January 7, 1939 – October 19, 2024) was an American criminologist and professor emeritus of criminology and law at the University of Florida's College of Liberal Arts and Sciences.

== Career ==
Akers taught sociology at the University of Washington from 1965 to 1972, criminology at Florida State University from 1972 to 1974, and sociology at the University of Iowa from 1974 to 1980. He chaired the department of sociology at the University of Iowa from 1978 to 1980, when he became a professor at the University of Florida. From 1980 to 1985, he chaired the department of sociology at the University of Florida. In 1994, he became the director of the Center for Studies in Criminology and Law.

== Awards and positions ==
In 1979, Akers served as president of the American Society of Criminology, and he received its Edwin H. Sutherland Award in 1988.

Besides his academic career, Akers was a Deacon in the Baptist Church and a bluegrass musician. He died on October 19, 2024, at the age of 85 in his home in Florida.

Professional and academic associations
Preceded by C. Ray Jeffery	President of the American Society of Criminology; 1979	Succeeded by Daniel Glaser
