= Richard S. Morse =

Richard Stetson Morse
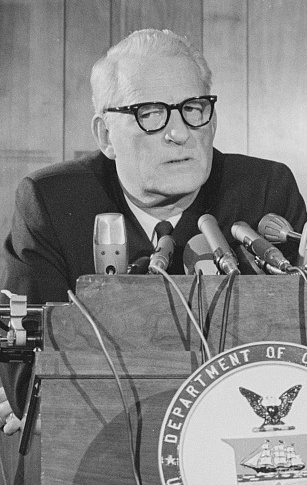
- Morse in 1967
- Born: August 19, 1911; Abington, Massachusetts, US
- Died: July 4, 1988 (aged 76); Falmouth, Massachusetts, US
- Education: Massachusetts Institute of Technology
- Spouse: Marion Elsa Baitz

Richard S. Morse (August 19, 1911 – July 1, 1988) was an American inventor and scientist credited with the invention of orange juice concentrate.

== Early life and education ==
Morse was born in Abington, Massachusetts on August 19, 1911. He received a B.S. degree from Massachusetts Institute of Technology in 1933 and did graduate work in physics at the Technische Hochschule Munich, Germany. He also received honorary doctorates from Brooklyn Polytechnic Institute (1959) and Clark University.

== Career ==
Following graduation, Morse spent 5 years in research work at Eastman Kodak Co. and Distillation Products, Inc. in Rochester, New York. In 1940, with venture capital provided by William A. Coolidge and other members of Enterprise Associates, he founded National Research Corporation (NRC). During World War II, NRC pioneered the use of high-vacuum engineering and other technologies to develop lens-coating for the Navy, magnesium production for the Defense Plants Corporation, and key dehydration strategies for manufacturing penicillin and drying blood plasma.

He was the co-founder of Minute Maid and would later go on to become a member of the National Academy of Engineering, Assistant Secretary of the Army, and a senior lecturer at Sloan School of Management of Massachusetts Institute of Technology.
