= Jacob Acker =

German painter

Jacob Acker was a painter in the second half of the 15th century in Ulm, Germany. He painted the impressive altar in the St. Leonhard cemetery Chapel in Ehingen (Donau)-Risstissen, Germany which bears his inscription Jacob acker maler zu ulm hat diese dafel gemacht uf des hailligen Kreutz tag an herst. anno dmi MCCCCLXXXIII jar. This means: "Jacob Acker, painter in Ulm has completed this painting on the day of the holy cross in the year of 1483".

Not much is known about this Jacob Acker "der Jüngere" (the younger). Most probably he belonged to the extended Ulm artist family of the Acker, many of them members of the so-called "Ulmer Schule" (school of Ulm). This dynasty of artists started with Jakob Acker "dem Älteren" (the elder), who lived around 1400. He painted some of the surviving stained glass windows of Ulm Minster. His son Hans Acker (about 1380–1461) continued with this profession and his stained glass windows can also still be admired in Ulm Minster. Whether Jacob Acker "der Juengere" is a son or brother of Hans Acker is not known.

Jakob Acker the Younger produced painted doors for the main pipe organ of Ulm Minster. This organ and Jakob Acker's doors are lost. In 1529 Ulm converted to Protestantism; under the radical influence of the reformer Zwingli on the so-called "Götzentag", the people of Ulm burned most of the paintings, altars, and organs of Ulm Minster in a huge fire on the square in front of the church in summer 1531. The Germans called this fundamentalist Protestant religious movement "die Bilderstürmer" (iconoclasts).

Because Risstissen, some 12 miles southwest of Ulm, then only partially owned by the city of Ulm remained Roman Catholic, Jakob Acker's remarkable Risstissen altar survived. It is believed to have been part of the decoration of the then Gothic main church of Risstissen, which was removed at the end of the 18th century and replaced with the present church.
