= Al Jazeera Arabic =

Qatari television channel

- Type: News broadcasting, state-funded
- Country: Qatar
- Broadcast area: Worldwide (primarily Arab world)
- Headquarters: Doha, Qatar

Programming
- Language: Arabic
- Picture format: 1080p (HD); 576i (SD)

Ownership
- Parent: Al Jazeera Media Network
- Sister channels: Al Jazeera English; Al Jazeera Mubasher; Al Jazeera Balkans; Al Jazeera Documentary Channel

History
- Launched: 1 November 1996; 30 years ago
- Former names: Jazeera Satellite Channel

Links
- Website: aljazeera.net (Arabic)

Al Jazeera Arabic (Arabic: الجزيرة Al-Jazīrah [æl (d)ʒæˈziːrɐ], lit. 'The Island or 'The Peninsula') is a Qatari state-funded Arabic-language news television network. It is based in Doha and operated by the Al Jazeera Media Network, which also operates Al Jazeera English. It is the largest news network in the Middle East and North Africa region. It was founded in 1996 by the then Emir of Qatar Sheikh Hamad bin Khalifa Al Thani.

Noted for its journalistic professionalism, especially when contrasted with other Arab news organizations, Al Jazeera gained popularity in the Arab world as an alternative to the previous landscape of largely local state-owned broadcasters, with its early coverage being openly critical of autocratic leaders in the region, as well as hosting a wide range of viewpoints, gaining credibility through its extensive frontline coverage of the Second Intifada and the Iraq War. By the early 2000s, Al Jazeera had become the primary source of news for a majority of Arab viewers. The channel's reach and credibility also gave Qatar a powerful diplomatic tool and an outsized influence in regional affairs. Al Jazeera Arabic is editorially independent from Al Jazeera English.

== History ==
=== Launch and initial coverage (1996–1999) ===
Al Jazeera Satellite Channel, now known as AJA, was founded by Hamad Bin Khalifa Al Thani, the then-Emir of the State of Qatar. He first publicly floated the idea of launching an international news channel in August 1994, when he was still crown prince. It was originally founded as a state-owned channel by an emiri decree on 8 February 1996. By the time the network was launched on 1 November 1996, many former workers of the first BBC Arabic television station, which had closed down in April of that year following censorship attempts by the Saudi government, were hired by Al Jazeera. Following a London screening of a six-hour test broadcast, the emir dropped his initial idea to mix news and entertainment, and decided on an all-news format. The channel was funded by Qatari government with a loan-turned-grant of approximately $137 million for its first five years of operations, and the government continued to cover more than $100 million per year in losses in the following years.

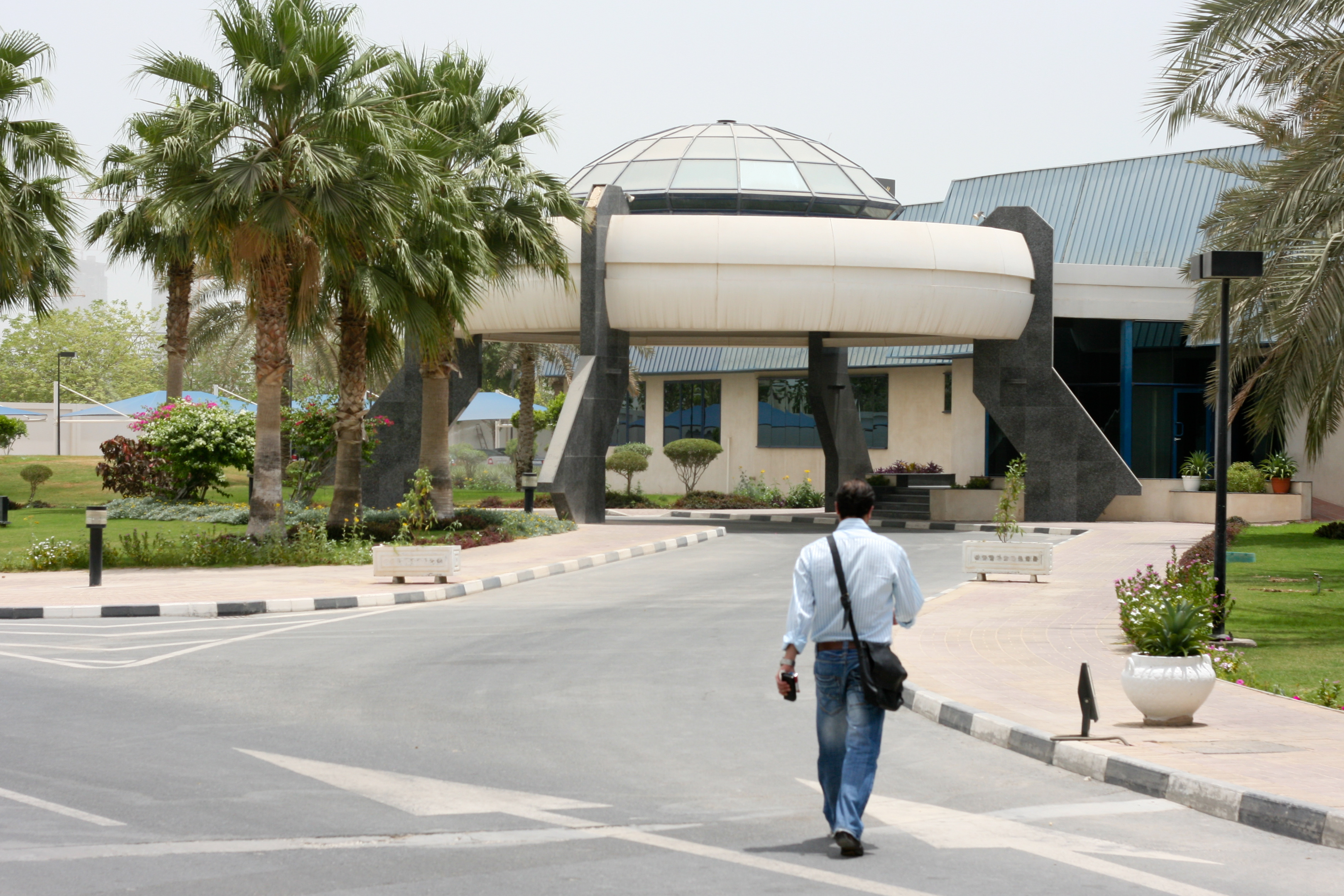
Al Jazeera Arabic building

Al Jazeera's first day on the air was 1 November 1996. It offered 6 hours of programming per day; this increased to 12 hours of programming by the end of 1997. It was broadcast to the immediate neighborhood as a terrestrial signal, and on cable. Al Jazeera is also available through satellites (which was also free to users in the Arab world), although Qatar, and many other Arab countries barred private individuals from having satellite dishes until 2001.

At the time of the Al Jazeera Media Network launch, Arabsat was the only satellite broadcasting to the Middle East, and for the first year could only offer Al Jazeera a weak C-band transponder that needed a large satellite dish for reception. A more powerful K_{u}-band transponder became available as a peace-offering after its user, Canal France International, accidentally beamed 30 minutes of pornography into ultraconservative Saudi Arabia.

Al Jazeera was not the first such broadcaster in the Middle East; a number had appeared since the Arabsat satellite, a Saudi Arabia-based venture of 21 Arab governments, took orbit in 1985. The unfolding of Operation Desert Storm on CNN International underscored the power of live television in current events. While other local broadcasters in the region would assiduously avoid material embarrassing to their home governments (Qatar has its own official TV station as well), Al Jazeera was pitched as an impartial news source and platform for discussing issues relating to the Arab world.

Shortly after its airing in 1996, Al Jazeera became the first Arabic language television station to include Israelis (often speaking Hebrew) as guests on its programs. Lively and far-ranging talk shows, particularly a popular, confrontational one called El-Itidjah el-Mouakass (Arabic for The Opposite Direction), were a constant source of controversy regarding issues of morality and religion. This prompted a torrent of criticism from the conservative voices among the region's press. It also led to official complaints and censures from neighboring governments. Some countries, including Egypt, which banned Al Jazeera in 2013, and Bahrain, which banned Al Jazeera temporarily in 2010, have jammed Al Jazeera's terrestrial broadcast or expelled its correspondents. In 1999, the Algerian government reportedly cut power to several major cities in order to censor a broadcast of El-Itidjah el-Mouakass. There were also commercial repercussions: a number of Arab countries, like Saudi Arabia and the UAE, reportedly pressured advertisers to avoid the channel, to great success.

Al Jazeera was the only international news network to have correspondents in Iraq during the Operation Desert Fox bombing campaign in 1998. In a precursor of a pattern to follow, its exclusive video clips were highly prized by Western media.

=== Beginning of 24/7 broadcasting (1999) ===
On 1 January 1999, Al Jazeera began to broadcast for 24 hours daily. Employment had more than tripled in one year to 500 employees. The agency had bureaus at a dozen sites as far away as the EU and Russia. Its annual budget was estimated at US$25 million at the time.

However controversial, Al Jazeera was rapidly becoming one of the most influential news agencies in the whole region. Eager for news beyond the official versions of events, Arabs became dedicated viewers. A 2000 estimate pegged nightly viewership at 35 million, ranking Al Jazeera first in the Arab world, over the Saudi Arabia-sponsored Middle East Broadcasting Centre (MBC) and London's Arab News Network (ANN). There were about 70 satellite or terrestrial channels being broadcast to the Middle East, most of them in Arabic. Al Jazeera launched a free Arabic-language web site in January 2001. In addition, the TV feed was soon available in the United Kingdom for the first time via British Sky Broadcasting.

=== War in Afghanistan (2001–2021) ===
Al Jazeera came to the attention of many in the West during the search for Osama bin Laden and the Taliban in Afghanistan after the 11 September 2001 attacks on the United States. It aired videos it received from Osama bin Laden and the Taliban, deeming new footage of the world's most wanted fugitives to be newsworthy. Some criticized the network for "giving a voice to terrorists". Al Jazeera's Washington, D.C., bureau chief, Hafez Al Mirazi, compared the situation to that of the Unabomber's messages in The New York Times. The network said it had been given the tapes because it had a large Arab audience.

Many other TV networks were eager to acquire the same footage. CNN International had exclusive rights to it for six hours before other networks could broadcast, a provision that was broken by the others on at least one controversial occasion. Prime Minister Tony Blair soon appeared on an Al Jazeera talk show on 14 November 2001, to state Britain's case for pursuing the Taliban into Afghanistan.

Al Jazeera's prominence rose during the war in Afghanistan because it had opened a bureau in Kabul before the war began. This gave it better access for videotaping events than other networks, which bought Al Jazeera's footage, sometimes for up to $250,000.

A United States missile destroyed the Kabul office in 2001. Looking to stay ahead of possible future conflicts, Al Jazeera then opened bureaux in other troubled spots.

The network remained dependent on government support in 2002, with a budget of US$40 million and ad revenues of about US$8 million. It also took in fees for sharing its news feed with other networks. It had an estimated 45 million viewers around the world. Al Jazeera soon had to contend with a new rival, Al Arabiya, a venture of the Middle East Broadcasting Center, which was set up in nearby Dubai with Saudi financial backing.

On 21 May 2003, Al Jazeera broadcast a three-minute clip from a tape that was obtained from Al Qaeda. In the tape, Ayman al-Zawahiri, an Egyptian physician and an intellectual supporter of Al Qaeda, mentioned the 11 September attack and other instances of terrorism against Western countries, saying that "The Crusaders and Jews understand only the language of killing and blood. They can only be persuaded through returning coffins, devastated interests, burning towers and collapsed economies."

In 2005, Tayseer Allouni, an Al Jazeera journalist who was tasked to interview Osama bin Laden several weeks after the 9/11 attacks was arrested in Spain while he was investigating the Madrid train bombings. Allouni was accused of being close to Al Qaeda, eventually was found guilty, and sentenced to seven years of house arrest.

In October 2003, the managing editor of the Saudi newspaper Arab News, John R. Bradley, recounted that the Bush administration had told the Qatari government that "If Al Jazeera failed to reconsider its news context, the US would, in turn, have to consider its relation with Qatar."

=== Iraq War (2003–2011) ===
Before and during the United States-led invasion of Iraq, where Al Jazeera had a presence since 1997, the network's facilities and footage were again highly sought by foreign networks. The channel and its web site also were seeing unprecedented attention from viewers looking for alternatives to embedded reporting and military press conferences.

Al Jazeera moved its sports coverage to a new, separate channel on 1 November 2003, allowing for more news and public affairs programming on the original channel. An English language web site had launched earlier in March 2003. The channel had about 1,300 to 1,400 employees, its newsroom editor told The New York Times. There were 23 bureaux around the world and 70 foreign correspondents, with 450 journalists in all.

On 1 April 2003, a United States plane fired on Al Jazeera's Baghdad bureau, killing reporter Tareq Ayyoub. The attack was called "a mistake" by The Pentagon; however, Al Jazeera had supplied the US with a precise map of the location of the bureau in order to spare it from attack.

=== Arab Spring (2010s) ===
Al Jazeera became the first channel to air the 2010 Tunisian protests following the death of Mohamed Bouazizi. In a short period, the protests in Tunisia spread to the other Arab states, becoming known as the Arab Spring, often leading to scrutiny from other Arab governments.

=== Qatar diplomatic crisis (2017–2021) ===
The closing of the Al Jazeera Media Network was one of the terms of diplomatic reestablishment put forward by Saudi Arabia, United Arab Emirates, Bahrain and Egypt during the 2017 Qatar diplomatic crisis.

On 23 June 2017, the countries that cut ties to Qatar issued a list of demands to end the crisis, insisting that Qatar shut down the Al Jazeera network, close a Turkish military base and scale down ties with Iran. The call, included in a list of 13 points, read: "Shut down Al Jazeera and its affiliate stations." Agencies, media outlets, journalists and media rights organizations decried the demands to close Al Jazeera as attempts to curb press freedom, including Reporters Without Borders; The Guardian, The New York Times, and the Committee to Protect Journalists (CPJ).

Earlier, Saudi Arabia and the UAE blocked Al Jazeera websites; Saudi Arabia closed Al Jazeera's bureau in Riyadh and halted its operating licence, accusing the network of promoting "terrorist groups" in the region; and Jordan also revoked the license for Al Jazeera. Saudi Arabia also banned hotels from airing Al Jazeera, threatening fines of up to 26,000 dollars for those violating the ban.

On 6 June 2017, Al Jazeera was the victim of a cyber attack on all of its platforms.

Qatari Minister of Foreign Affairs, Mohammed bin Abdulrahman bin Jassim Al Thani, has said Doha will not discuss the status of Al Jazeera in any negotiations. "Doha rejects discussing any matter related to Al Jazeera channel as it considers it an internal affair," Qatar News Agency quoted the foreign minister as saying. "Decisions concerning the Qatari internal affairs are Qatari sovereignty - and no one has to interfere with them."

In June 2017, hacked emails from Yousef Al Otaiba (UAE ambassador to US) were reported as "embarrassing" by HuffPost because they showed links between the UAE and the US-based pro-Israel Foundation for Defense of Democracies. UAE-based Al Arabiya English claimed that the extensive media coverage of the email hack was a provocation and that the hacking was a move orchestrated by Qatar.

On 24 November 2017, Dubai Police deputy chief Lieutenant General Dhahi Khalfan Tamim accused Al Jazeera of provoking the 2017 Sinai attack and called for bombing of Al Jazeera by the Saudi-led coalition, tweeting in Arabic "The alliance must bomb the machine of terrorism ... the channel of ISIL, al-Qaeda and the al-Nusra front, Al Jazeera the terrorists".

In 2018, Al Jazeera reported apparent new details regarding a 1996 Qatari coup d'état attempt in a documentary accusing the United Arab Emirates, Saudi Arabia, Bahrain, and Egypt, of orchestrating it. According to the documentary, a former French army commander, Paul Barril, was contracted and supplied with weapons by the UAE to carry out the coup operation in Qatar. UAE minister of foreign affairs Anwar Gargash responded to the documentary and stated that Paul Barril was "in fact a security agent of the Qatari Sheikh Khalifa bin Hamad Al Thani who visited Abu Dhabi and had no relationship with the UAE" and the documentary was "a falsification" attempt to inculpate the UAE in the coup.

=== United Arab Emirates lobbying (2019) ===
As of June 2019, the United Arab Emirates had paid the lobbying firm Akin Gump Strauss Hauer & Feld $1.9m in the preceding year, principally concerning Qatar government-owned media. Lobbyists met with the FCC nine times and with 30 members of the House and Senate during the same time period. A spokesman for the chair of the Senate Finance Committee, Chuck Grassley, said that the committee had been "reviewing Al Jazeera's activities" prior to the UAE's lobbying effort.

During this time, the firm lobbied for Al Jazeera to be reclassified as a foreign agent as defined by the Foreign Agents Registration Act, which was simultaneously the focus of a Twitter campaign. On 20 September 2019, Twitter announced it had shut down two groups of accounts with links to UAE spreading disinformation primarily aimed against Qatar. According to Bloomberg, the archive of the incriminated accounts' tweets showed hundreds of messages attacking Al-Jazeera.

== Organization ==
The original Al Jazeera channel was launched 1 November 1996 by an emiri decree with a loan-turned-grant of approximately $137 million for its first five years of operations from the then-Emir of Qatar, Sheikh Hamad bin Khalifa. The then-emir continued covering more than $100 million per year in losses in the following years. The channel began broadcasting in late 1996, with many staff joining from the BBC World Service's Saudi-co-owned Arabic-language TV station, which had shut down on 1 April 1996 after two years of operation because of censorship demands by the Saudi Arabian government. The Al Jazeera logo is a decorative representation of the network's name using Arabic calligraphy. It was selected by the station's founder, Emir of Qatar Sheikh Hamad bin Khalifa, as the winning entry in a design competition.

=== Staff ===
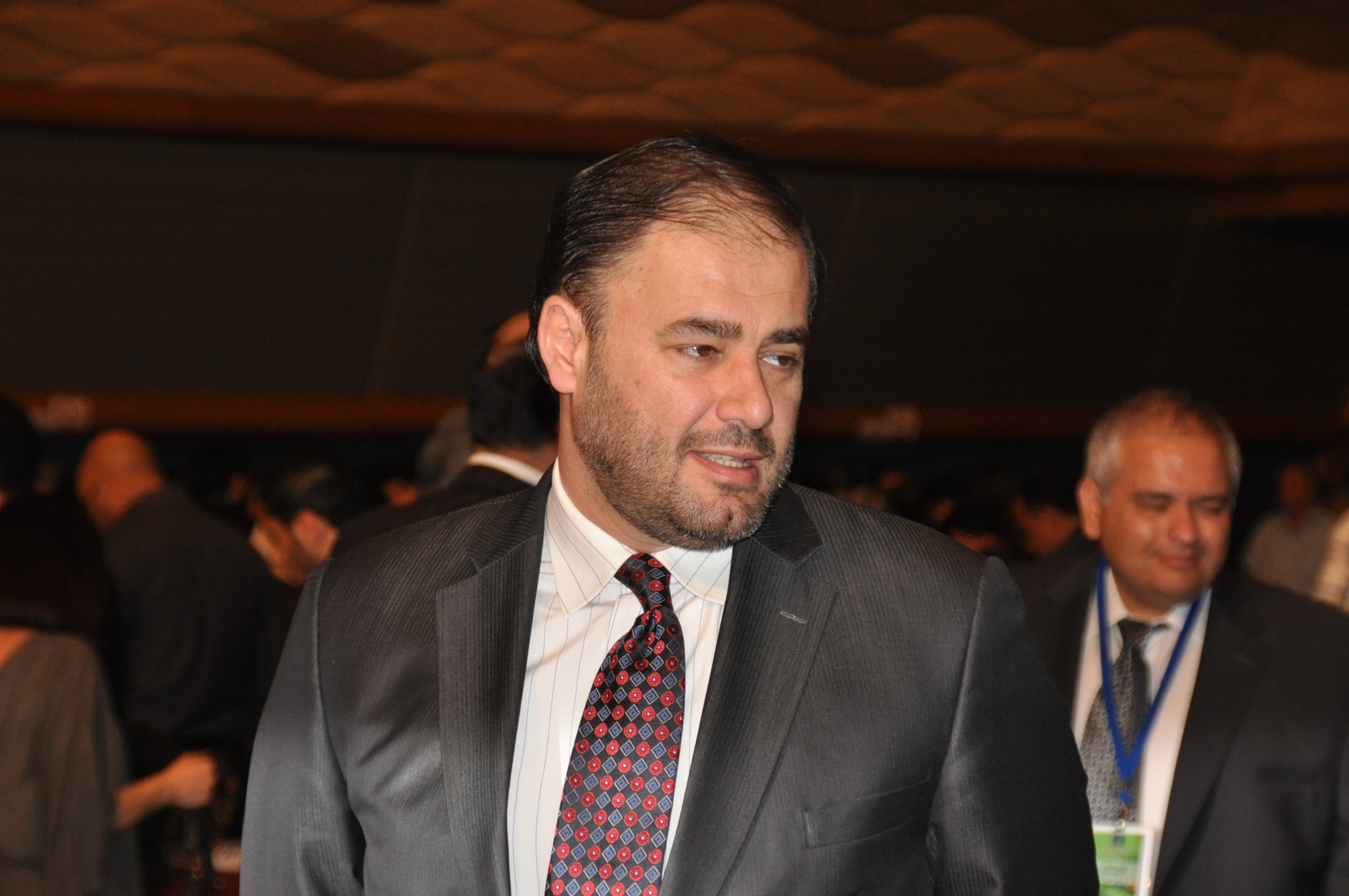
Wadah Khanfar, former Director General of Al Jazeera Media Network

Al Jazeera restructured its operations to form a network that contains all their different channels. Wadah Khanfar, the then managing director of the Arabic Channel, was appointed as the director general of Al Jazeera Media Network. He also acted as the managing director of the original Arabic Channel. Khanfar resigned on 20 September 2011 proclaiming that he had achieved his original goals, and that 8 years was enough time for any leader of an organization, in an interview aired on Al Jazeera English. Ahmed bin Jassim Al Thani replaced Khanfar and served as the director general of the channel from September 2011 to June 2013 when he was appointed minister of economy and trade. The chairman of the channel is Hamad bin Thamer Al Thani. The Director General and editor-in-chief of the Arabic website is Mostefa Souag, who replaced Ahmed Sheikh as editor-in-chief. It has more than 100 editorial staff. The managing director of Al Jazeera English is Al Anstey. Mohamed Nanabhay became editor-in-chief of the English-language site in 2009. Previous editors include Beat Witschi and Russell Merryman.

Prominent on-air personalities include Faisal al-Qassem, host of the talk show The Opposite Direction, Ahmed Mansour, host of the show Without Borders (bi-la Hudud) and Sami Haddad.

Its former Iran and Beirut Bureau Chief was Ghassan bin Jiddo. He became an influential figure on Al Jazeera with his program Hiwar Maftuh, one of the most frequently watched programs. He also interviewed Nasrallah in 2007 and produced a documentary about Hezbollah. Some suggested that he would even replace Wadah Khanfar. Bin Jiddo resigned after political disagreements with the station.

=== Personnel killed or injured in service ===
==== Shireen Abu Akleh (2022) ====
On 11 May 2022, Al Jazeera journalist Shireen Abu Akleh was shot during an Israeli raid in Jenin. Videos revealed that she was shot in the head while covering Israeli raid in Jenin. She was in a critical condition and was declared dead at the hospital. Al Jazeera alleged that their journalist was a target of the Israeli security forces, and that they killed her deliberately. The media house called for the international community to hold Israel accountable for Abu Akleh's death. On the other hand, Israel Defence Forces said their security forces was operating “to arrest suspects in terrorist activities” in the region. They claimed the firing was from both sides, that is, the Israeli forces and the Palestinian gunmen. Abu Akleh's producer was also shot and wounded. Al Jazeera stated that Shireen Abu Akleh was "clearly wearing press jacket that identifies her as a journalist." Later, the Israeli military admitted there was a “high possibility” that Abu Akleh was shot and killed by Israeli fire. Al Jazeera responded to these revelations with the statement: “Al Jazeera denounces the Israeli occupation army’s lack of frank recognition of its crime. The network calls for an independent international party to investigate the crime of the assassination of Shireen Abu Akleh, in order to accomplish justice for Shireen, her family and fellow journalists around the world.”

==== Samer Abu Daqqa (2023) ====
On 15 December 2023 at about 17:00 GMT, it was reported that two Al Jazeera journalists, cameraman Samer Abu Daqqa and reporter Wael Al-Dahdouh, were both wounded in a drone strike on Khan Younis. An hour and a half later, Al Jazeera announced that Samer Abu Daqqa had been declared dead live on air. Via their Telegram page, Hamas has condemned the killing, alongside other journalists, medical staff, and humanitarian workers.

== Influence ==
Many governments in the Middle East deploy state-run media or government censorship to impact local media coverage and public opinion, leading to international objections regarding press freedom and biased media coverage. Some scholars and commentators use the notion of contextual objectivity, which highlights the tension between objectivity and audience appeal, to describe the station's controversial yet popular news approach.

Increasingly, Al Jazeera Media Network's exclusive interviews and other footage are being rebroadcast in American, British, and other western media outlets such as CNN and the BBC. In January 2003, the BBC announced that it had signed an agreement with Al Jazeera for sharing facilities and information, including news footage.

Al Jazeera's availability (via satellite) throughout the Middle East changed the television landscape of the region. Al Jazeera presented controversial views regarding the governments of many Arab states on the Persian Gulf, including Saudi Arabia, Kuwait, Bahrain and Qatar; it also presented controversial views about Syria's relationship with Lebanon, and the Egyptian judiciary. Critics accused Al Jazeera Media Network of sensationalism in order to increase its audience share. Al Jazeera's broadcasts have sometimes resulted in drastic action: for example, when, on 27 January 1999, critics of the Algerian government appeared on the channel's live program El-Itidjah el-Mouakass ("The Opposite Direction"), the Algerian government cut the electricity supply to large parts of the capital Algiers (and allegedly also to large parts of the country) to prevent the program from being seen. Al Jazeera's popularity has been attributed to its in-depth coverage of issues considered to be of great importance to the international Arab population, many of which received minimal attention from other outlets, such as: the Palestinian perspective on the second Intifada, the experiences of Iraqis living through the Iraq war, and the exclusive broadcast of tapes produced by Osama Bin-Laden.

At the time of the aforementioned incident in Algeria, Al Jazeera Media Network was not yet generally known in the Western world, but where it was known, opinion was often favorable and Al Jazeera claimed to be the only politically independent television station in the Middle East. However, it was not until late 2001 that Al Jazeera achieved worldwide recognition, when it broadcast video statements by al-Qaeda leaders.

Some observers have argued that Al Jazeera Media Network has formidable authority as an opinion-maker. Noah Bonsey and Jeb Koogler, for example, writing in the Columbia Journalism Review, argue that the way in which the station covers any future Israeli-Palestinian peace deal could well determine whether or not that deal is actually accepted by the Palestinian public.

The channel's tremendous popularity has also, for better or worse, made it a shaper of public opinion. Its coverage often determines what becomes a story and what does not, as well as how Arab viewers think about issues. Whether in Saudi Arabia, Egypt, Jordan, or Syria, the stories highlighted and the criticisms aired by guests on Al Jazeera's news programs have often significantly affected the course of events in the region. In Palestine, the station's influence is particularly strong. Recent polling indicates that in the West Bank and Gaza, Al Jazeera is the primary news source for an astounding 53.4 percent of Palestinian viewers. The second and third most watched channels, Palestine TV and Al Arabiya, poll a distant 12.8 percent and 10 percent, respectively. The result of Al Jazeera's market dominance is that it has itself become a mover and shaker in Palestinian politics, helping to craft public perceptions and influence the debate. This has obvious implications for the peace process: how Al Jazeera covers the deliberations and the outcome of any negotiated agreement with Israel will fundamentally shape how it is viewed—and, more importantly, whether it is accepted—by the Palestinian public.

Al Jazeera's broad availability in the Arab world "operat[ing] with less constraint than almost any other Arab outlet, and remain[ing] the most popular channel in the region", has been perceived as playing a part in the Arab Spring, including the Tunisian and Egyptian revolutions. The New York Times stated in January 2011: "The protests rocking the Arab world this week have one thread uniting them: Al Jazeera, ... whose aggressive coverage has helped propel insurgent emotions from one capital to the next." The newspaper quoted Marc Lynch, a professor of Middle East Studies at George Washington University: "They did not cause these events, but it's almost impossible to imagine all this happening without Al Jazeera."

With Al Jazeera's growing global outreach and influence, some scholars including Adel Iskandar have described the station as a transformation of the very definition of "alternative media." Al Jazeera presents a new direction in the discourse of global news flow and shows voices underrepresented by traditional mainstream media regardless of global imbalances in the flow of information.

== Expansion ==
In 2011, Al Jazeera Media Network launched Al Jazeera Balkans, which is based in Sarajevo and serves the ex-Yugoslavia region in Bosnian, Serbian, and Croatian. The look and feel of the network is similar to Al Jazeera English.

Al Jazeera launched a Turkish-language news website in 2014; it was shut down on 3 May 2017.

=== Al Jazeera English ===
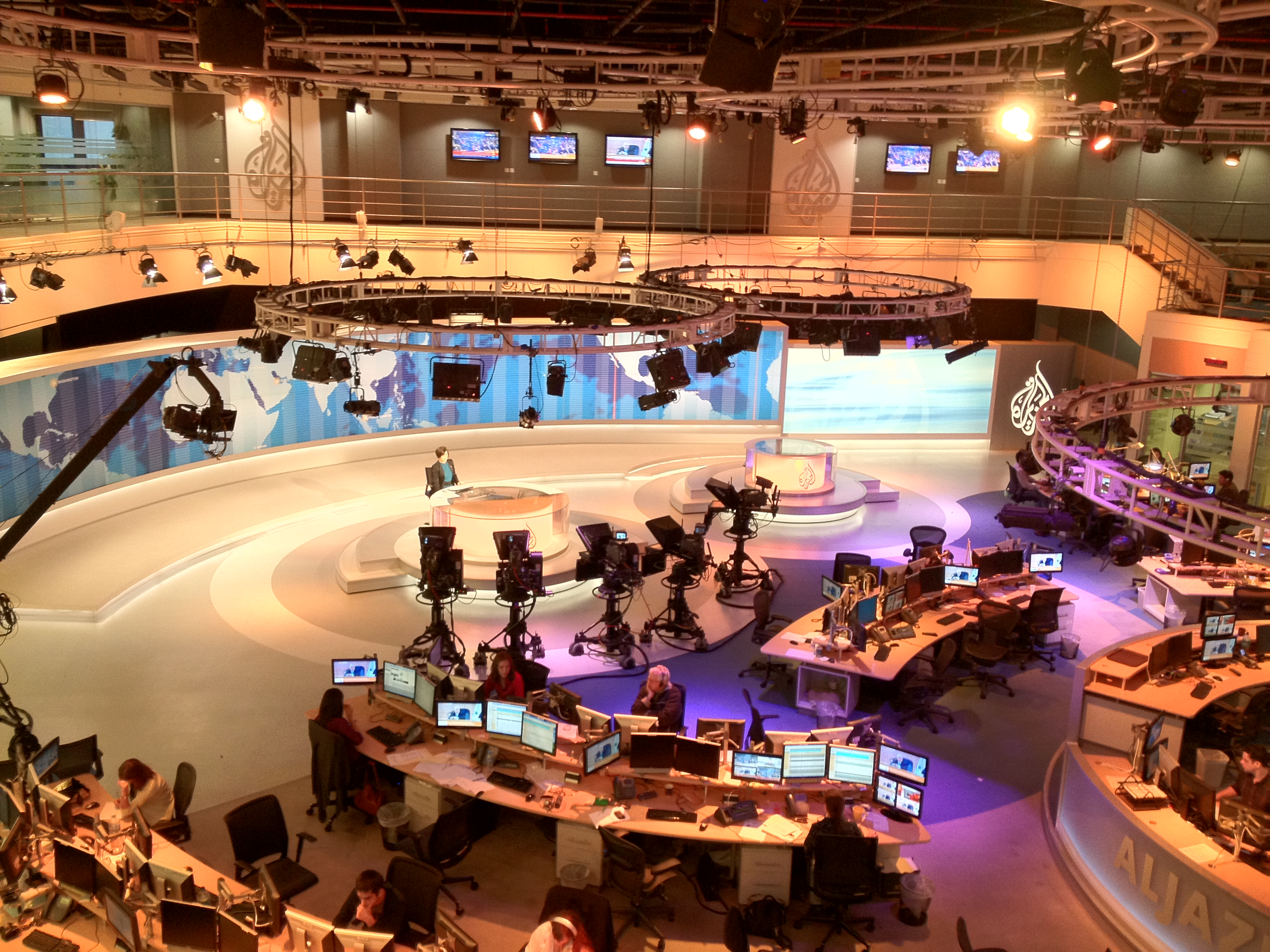
Al Jazeera English newsroom, 2011

In March 2003, it launched an English-language website. On 4 July 2005, Al Jazeera officially announced plans to launch a new English-language satellite service to be called Al Jazeera International. The new channel started at 12:00 GMT on 15 November 2006 under the name Al Jazeera English and has broadcast centers in Doha (next to the original Al Jazeera headquarters and broadcast center), London, Kuala Lumpur, and Washington D.C. The channel is a 24-hour, 7-days-a-week news channel, with 12 hours broadcast from Doha, and four hours each from London, Kuala Lumpur, and Washington D.C.

Al Jazeera launched an English language channel, originally called Al Jazeera International, in 2006. Among its staff were journalists hired from ABC's Nightline and other top news outfits. Josh Rushing, a former media handler for CENTCOM during the Iraq war, agreed to provide commentary; David Frost was also on board. In an interesting technical feat, the broadcast of the new operation was handed off between bases in Doha, London, Washington, D.C., and Kuala Lumpur on a daily cycle.

The new English language venture faced considerable regulatory and commercial hurdles in the North America market for its perceived sympathy with extremist causes. At the same time, others felt Al Jazeera's competitive advantage lay in programming in the Arabic language. There were hundreds of millions of potential viewers among the non-Arabic language speaking Muslims in Europe and Asia, however, and many others who might be interested in seeing news from the Middle East read by local voices. If the venture panned out, it would extend the influence of Al Jazeera, and tiny Qatar, beyond even what had been achieved in the station's first decade. In an interesting twist of fate, the BBC World Service was preparing to launch its own Arabic language station in 2007. Today, evidence of U.S. antipathy at the Arabic network has dissipated significantly, though not entirely, several American analysts said in 2013.

=== Al Jazeera America ===
In January 2013, Al Jazeera Media Network purchased Current TV, which was partially owned by former U.S. Vice President Al Gore. Using part of Current TV's infrastructure, Al Jazeera launched an American news channel on 20 August 2013.

Though Current TV had large distribution throughout the United States on cable and satellite television, it averaged only 28,000 viewers at any time. The acquisition of Current TV by Al Jazeera allowed Time Warner Cable to drop the network due to its low ratings, but they released a statement saying that they would consider carrying the channel after they evaluated whether it made sense for their customers. Time Warner Cable later began carrying Al Jazeera America in December 2013.

In August 2014, Gore and fellow shareholder Joel Hyatt launched a lawsuit against Al Jazeera claiming a residual payment of $65 million of the sale proceeds, due in 2014, remained unpaid. Al Jazeera later announced a countersuit. In 2016, the case was settled outside of court on the basis of a mutual agreement, under which: Gore and Hyatt had their claims waived, Al Jazeera was ordered to pay the $2.35 million in legal fees incurred by the plaintiffs, and the network forfeited its rights to pursue any indemnification claims related to the ordeal.

On 13 January 2016, Al Jazeera America CEO Al Anstey announced that the network would cease operations on 12 April 2016, citing the "economic landscape".

=== Sports channels ===
beIN SPORTS, formerly Al Jazeera Sport channels, was legally separated from Al Jazeera Media Network on 1 January 2014 and is now controlled by beIN Media Group.

beIN SPORTS currently operates three channels in France – beIN Sport 1, beIN Sport 2 and beIN Sport MAX – and launched two channels in the United States (English and Spanish) in August 2012. The network also has a Canadian Channel and holds Canadian broadcast rights to several sports properties, The network also has an Australian channel.

beIN Sport holds the rights to broadcast major football tournaments on French television, including Ligue 1, Bundesliga, the UEFA Champions League and the European Football Championships. In the United States and Canada, beIN Sport holds the rights to broadcast La Liga, Serie A, Ligue 1, Copa del Rey, South American World Cup Qualifier and English Championship matches, in addition to Barca TV.

In October 2009, Al Jazeera acquired six sports channels of the ART. On 26 November 2009, Al Jazeera English received approval from the CRTC, which enables Al Jazeera English to broadcast via satellite in Canada.

=== Availability ===
The original Al Jazeera channel is available worldwide through various satellite and cable systems. For availability info of the Al Jazeera network's other TV channels, see their respective articles. Segments of Al Jazeera English are uploaded to YouTube or at Breaking News, World News and Video from Al Jazeera.

Europe, Northern Africa and the Middle East. Al Jazeera can be freely viewed with a DVB-S receiver in Europe, Northern Africa and the Middle East as it is broadcast on the Astra 1M, Eutelsat Hot Bird 13A, Eutelsat 10A, Badr 4, Turksat 2A, Thor 6, Nilesat 102, Hispasat 1C and Eutelsat 28A satellites. The Optus C1 satellite in Australia carries the channel for free and from July 2012 is available at no extra charge to all subscribers to Australia's Foxtel pay-TV service.

Canada. Al Jazeera is available in Canada on Bell Channel 516, as part of the package "International News I." Al Jazeera is available on Rogers Cable individually. Al Jazeera is also available on Shaw Cable TV Channel 513, as part of the package "Multicultural"

India. On 7 December 2010, Al Jazeera said its English language service has got a downlink license to broadcast in India. Satellite and cable companies would therefore be allowed to broadcast Al Jazeera in the country. The broadcaster will be launched soon on Dish TV, and is considering a Hindi-language channel.

United Kingdom. Al Jazeera English is available on the Sky and Freesat satellite platforms, as well as the standard terrestrial service (branded Freeview), thus making it available to the vast majority of UK households. On 26 November 2013, it launched a HD simulcast on certain terrestrial transmitters.

United States. Al Jazeera English is not widely available, as it is not carried by Xfinity or the other major cable television systems which package and market most commercial television in the United States. It can be viewed online via its live stream on its website, DVB-S, Galaxy 19, and Galaxy 23 C-band satellites.

Following the launch of Al Jazeera America in 2013 until 2016 when the channel folded, Al Jazeera English was not available in the United States. It had been available through live streaming over the Al Jazeera website, DVB-S, Galaxy 19, free to air and Galaxy 23 satellites, and it had been broadcast over the air in the Washington, DC DMA by WNVC on digital channel 30–5, and on digital channel 48.2 in the New York metro area, but those broadcasts were discontinued on 20 August 2013. Al Jazeera English had also been available to cable TV viewers in Toledo, Ohio, Burlington, Vermont, New York City (WRNN rebroadcast), Washington State, and Washington, D.C. (a rebroadcast of WNVC's feed), but those sources were switched to Al Jazeera America on 20 August 2013. Many analysts had considered the limited availability of Al Jazeera English in the United States to be effectively a "blackout". The live stream and programming over the internet that had been geoblocked was made available to viewers in the United States again in September 2016.

Online. Al Jazeera English can be viewed over the Internet from their official website. The low-resolution version is available free of charge to users of computers and video streaming boxes, and the high-resolution version is available under subscription fees through partner sites. Al Jazeera's English division has also partnered with Livestation for Internet-based broadcasting. This enables Al Jazeera English and Al Jazeera live to be watched worldwide.

=== Web service ===
Al Jazeera Media Network's web-based service is accessible subscription-free throughout the world, at a variety of websites. The station launched an English-language edition of its online content in March 2003. This English language website was relaunched on 15 November 2006, along with the launch of Al Jazeera English. The English and Arabic sections are editorially distinct, with their own selection of news and comment. Al Jazeera and Al Jazeera English are streamed live on the official site, as well as on YouTube. On 13 April 2009 Al Jazeera launched versions of its English and Arabic sites suitable for mobile devices.

The Arabic version of the site was brought offline for about 10 hours by an FBI raid on its ISP, InfoCom Corporation, on 5 September 2001. InfoCom was later convicted of exporting to Syria and Gaddafi-ruled Libya, of knowingly being invested in by a Hamas member (both of which are illegal in the United States), and of underpaying customs duties.

In 2014, Al Jazeera Media Network launched an online only channel called AJ+. The channel is based out of the former Current TV studios in San Francisco and has outposts in Doha, Kuala Lumpur and other locations. It is independent of all of Al Jazeera's other channels and is mostly in an on demand format. The channel launched on 13 June 2014 with a preview on YouTube. This was followed in 2017 by the launch of Jetty, a podcast network which is also based out of the former Current TV studios in San Francisco.

In 2018, Al Jazeera launched a Mandarin-language news website. It is the first Arabic news provider to target the Chinese audience. The staff of the project will be in contact with their audience via Chinese social media like Weibo, Meipai and WeChat.

In 2021, Al Jazeera launched a new online platform called "Rightly" aimed at a conservative US audience. "Right Now with Stephen Kent" is Rightly's first show and is an opinion-led, in-studio interview program hosted by Stephen Kent. Right Now is available on YouTube and as a podcast. It was reported that over 100 staff at Al Jazeera signed an open letter to management objecting to the launch, with some of them voicing their unhappiness with Rightly on Twitter. In 2022, Al Jazeera reportedly stopped creating content for the program.

==== Creative Commons ====
On 13 January 2009 Al Jazeera Media Network released some of its broadcast quality footage from Gaza under a Creative Commons license. Contrary to business "All Rights Reserved" standards, the license invites third parties, including rival broadcasters, to reuse and remix the footage, so long as Al Jazeera is credited. The videos are hosted on blip.tv, which allows easy downloading and integration with Miro.

Al Jazeera Media Network also offers over 2,000 Creative Commons-licensed still photos at their Flickr account.

==== Citizen journalism ====
Al Jazeera Media Network accepts user-submitted photos and videos about news events through a Your Media page, and this content may be featured on the website or in broadcasts.

The channel used the Ushahidi platform to collect information and reports about the Gaza War, through Twitter, SMS and the website.

=== Planned projects ===
In 2006, Al Jazeera Urdu, a planned Urdu language channel to cater mainly to Pakistanis was announced A Kiswahili service called Al Jazeera Kiswahili was to be based in Nairobi and broadcast in Kenya, Tanzania, Uganda, Rwanda and Burundi. However, those plans were cancelled due to budget constraints.

The channel also has plans to launch a Spanish-language news network to cater mainly to Spain and Hispanic America, like the Iranian cable TV network HispanTV. Al Jazeera has also been reported to be planning to launch an international newspaper. Al Jazeera Arabic began using a chroma key studio on 13 September 2009. Similar to Sky News, Al Jazeera broadcast from that studio while the channel's main newsroom was given a new look. The channel relaunched, with new graphics and music along with a new studio, on 1 November 2009, the 13th birthday of the channel.

== Awards ==
- In March 2003, Al Jazeera was awarded by Index on Censorship for its "courage in circumventing censorship and contributing to the free exchange of information in the Arab world."
- In April 2004, the Webby Awards nominated Al Jazeera as one of the five best news Web sites, along with BBC News, National Geographic, RocketNews and The Smoking Gun. According to Tiffany Shlain, the founder of the Webby Awards, this caused a controversy as [other media organisations] "felt it was a risk-taking site".
- In 2004, Al Jazeera was voted by brandchannel.com readers as the fifth most influential global brand behind Apple Computer, Google, IKEA and Starbucks.
- In January 2013, Al Jazeera was nominated for the Responsible Media of the Year award at the British Muslim Awards.
- In 2019 Al Jazeera Investigations Unit won the Walkley Awards for "Scoop of the Year".
- In 2021 Al Jazeera received a journalism award by Hamas as a result of the network's coverage of the latest Gaza conflict.
- Ali Rae won the Content Creator of the Year award at The Drum Online Media Awards 2023, for a 5-part video series about the breakdown of the planet's ecosystem titled "All Hail the Planet".

== Selected documentaries ==
- Al Jazeera's coverage of the invasion of Iraq was the focus of a documentary film, Control Room (2004) by Egyptian-American director Jehane Noujaim.
- In July 2003, PBS broadcast a documentary called Exclusive to al-Jazeera on its program Wide Angle.
- In 2008, Al Jazeera filmed Egypt: A Nation in Waiting, which documented trends in Egypt's political history and foreshadowed the Egyptian Revolution of 2011.
- Another documentary, Al Jazeera, An Arab Voice for Freedom or Demagoguery? The UNC Tour was filmed two months after 11 September 2001 Terrorist Attack.
- ISIL and the Taliban. Filmed in 2015 by an Arab Al Jazeera reporter named Najibullah Quraishi, it covers Islamic State's presence in Afghanistan and how they groom children for their causes. It is about Taliban commanders angry about Islamic State's presence, Afghan National Army starting offensives in Achin and 2 suicide bombers targeting Jandal, a former warlord.
- Tutu's Children (2017), a documentary about Desmond Tutu's experiment of coaching young professionals to be African leaders.
- The Lobby TV series, is about an undercover Al Jazeera reporter who infiltrates several pro-Israel advocacy organizations in Washington, D.C., including Stand With Us, The Israel Project, the Foundation for Defense of Democracies, the Israel on Campus Coalition, and the Zionist Organization of America's (ZOA) Fuel For Truth.
- Four Dead in Ohio (2010), a documentary about the 1970 Kent State shootings at Kent State University. Also known as the 4 May Massacre or the Kent State Massacre, the incident involved unarmed college students shot by Ohio National Guard members on campus during a mass protest against bombing of Cambodia by U.S. military forces.

== Controversies and criticism ==
While Al Jazeera has a large audience in the Middle East, the organization and the original Arabic channel in particular have been criticised and involved in a number of controversies.

Although Al Jazeera has denied that it its editorial process is interfered with by its state owners, Al Jazeera has been accused of supporting the stances of the Qatari government on regional issues, with the BBC describing its Arabic-language coverage as more biased than that of Al Jazeera English, and giving favourable coverage of Muslim Brotherhood aligned Islamist groups. At the onset of the Qatar diplomatic crisis in 2017, the governments of Saudi Arabia, Egypt, the United Arab Emirates and Bahrain called for the closure of the entire Al Jazeera conglomerate as part of a list of thirteen demands that were presented to the Qatari government in exchange for re-normalized relations, though this never came to pass.

=== United States ===
In 2004 and 2005, during the Iraq War, Al Jazeera Arabic was criticised by George W. Bush as a source of "hateful propaganda" and by Donald Rumsfeld as "propaganda," "inexcusably biased" and "vicious."

Several Al Jazeera staff were killed by U.S. military friendly-fire incidents. The United-States-controlled Iraqi interim government closed the offices of Al Jazeera in Baghdad in August 2004 during the United States occupation of Iraq. The interim Iraqi prime minister Iyad Allawi then accused the channel of inciting hatred in the country. At the end of April 2013, the Iraqi government led by Nouri Al Maliki once again ordered Al Jazeera to stop broadcasting due to the alleged role of the channel in encouraging the sectarian unrest. In response to the restrictions imposed by Al Maliki, Al Jazeera issued a statement in which the organization expressed its astonishment at the development, and reiterated their assertion, "We cover all sides of the stories in Iraq, and have done for many years." The network further objected to the ban, saying, "The fact that so many channels have been hit all at once though suggests this is an indiscriminate decision. We urge the authorities to uphold freedom for the media to report the important stories taking place in Iraq."

In 2019, congressman Jack Bergman wrote in the Washington Examiner that "Al Jazeera's record of radical anti-American, anti-Semitic, and anti-Israel broadcasts warrants scrutiny from regulators to determine whether this network is in violation of US law".

=== Egypt ===
During the 2011 Egyptian protests, on 30 January the Egyptian government ordered the TV channel to close its offices. The next day Egyptian security forces arrested six Al Jazeera journalists for several hours and seized their camera equipment. There were also reports of disruption in Al Jazeera Mubasher's Broadcast to Egypt. The channel was also criticized for being sympathetic to Mohamed Morsi and the Muslim Brotherhood and former IAEA director Mohammed ElBaradei. It was closed for the same reasons in September 2013. Twenty-two members of staff of Al Jazeera's Egyptian bureau announced their resignation on 8 July 2013, citing biased coverage of the ongoing Egyptian power redistribution in favour of the Muslim Brotherhood. Al Jazeera says that the resignations were due to pressure from the Egyptian military.

=== Syria ===
Al Jazeera has been criticized over unfair coverage of the Syrian Civil War. The channel's reporting has been described as largely supportive of the rebels, while demonizing the Syrian government. The Lebanese newspaper As-Safir cited outtakes of interviews showing that the channel's staff coached Syrian eyewitnesses and fabricated reports of oppression by Syria's government. In January 2013, a former Al Jazeera employee from Syria stated their belief that there was ongoing strong pressure to conform to biased coverage of the Syrian Civil War. However, according to Pew Research Center study, in its coverage of the Syrian crisis, Al Jazeera America cable news channel provided viewers with content that often resembles what Americans saw on other U.S. cable news outlets.

=== India ===
The Indian government banned the Al Jazeera TV channel in April 2015 for five telecast days as it repeatedly displayed disputed maps of India. The suspension concerns maps of Pakistan used in 2013 and 2014 that did not demarcate the part of Kashmir under Pakistani control (Pakistan-administered Kashmir) as a separate territory. Once notified by Indian authorities, the channel said it ensured all maps from 22 September 2014, onward used dotted lines and unique shading for the disputed portions.

In June 2023, India … Who Lit the Fuse?, a documentary produced by Al Jazeera's Point Blank investigation series, was banned by the Allahabad High Court in Uttar Pradesh. The documentary investigates the activities of Hindu nationalist groups and portrays the challenges faced by India's Muslim minority.

=== Israel ===
On 19 July 2008, Al Jazeera TV broadcast a program from Lebanon which covered the "welcome-home" festivities for Samir Kuntar, a Lebanese citizen who had been imprisoned in Israel for killing four people in a Palestinian Liberation Front raid from Lebanon into Israel. In the program, the head of Al Jazeera's Beirut office, Ghassan bin Jiddo, praised Kuntar as a "pan-Arab hero" and organized a birthday party for him. In response, Israel's Government Press Office (GPO) announced a boycott of the channel, which was to include a general refusal by Israeli officials to be interviewed by the station, and a ban on its correspondents from entering government offices in Jerusalem. A few days later an official letter was issued by Al Jazeera's director general, Wadah Khanfar, in which he admitted that the program violated the station's Code of Ethics and that he had ordered the channel's programming director to take steps to ensure that such an incident does not recur.

On 1 April 2024, the Knesset passed a law banning Al Jazeera in Israel as Benjamin Netanyahu called Al Jazeera a "security threat". Israeli forces raided the broadcaster's offices in Ramallah, in the occupied West Bank, and ordered its closure for 45-days. Bureau chief Walid Al-Omari allowed to read the closure notice on camera before the Israeli soldiers removed him from the building and confiscated the journalists' cameras.

=== Switzerland ===
In January 2026, the Swiss television providers, Swisscom and Sunrise, removed the Al Jazeera's Arabic channel from its programming. This took place due to allegations by the pro-Israel group "Focus Israel" that Al Jazeera Arabic aired propaganda supporting Hamas, in violation of Swiss law.

== Channel ==
- Al Jazeera Channel Arab World
- Al Jazeera Channel International

== See also ==
- Al Jazeera effect
- International news channels
- List of Arabic-language television channels
- Media of Qatar
- State media

== Sources ==
- Abdul-Nabi, Zainab (2022). Al-Jazeera's "Double Standards" in the Arab Spring: A Peace Journalism Analysis (2011-2021). Palgrave Macmillan. doi:10.1007/978-3-031-14279-6. ISBN 978-3031142789.
