= Walid Al-Omari =

Palestinian journalist and writer

- وليد العمري
- Born: February 11, 1957 (age 69); Sandala, Israel
- Education: Hebrew University of Jerusalem; Tel Aviv University; The Hague University of Applied Sciences (PhD)
- Occupation: Journalist
- Employer: Al Jazeera
- Awards: Palestine International Prize for Media (2000)

Walid Al-Omari (Arabic: وليد العمري; born 11 February 1957) is an Arab / Palestinian journalist, writer and the bureau chief of Al Jazeera in Jerusalem and Ramallah.

== Early life and education ==
Al-Omari was born in Sandala, Israel on 11 February 1957. He studied at Arab Orthodox College Haifa. He received a degree in International relations from the Hebrew University of Jerusalem. Also studied at Tel Aviv University and then received a doctorate in media from The Hague University of Applied Sciences.

== Career ==
He first joined the MBC and NBC channel as a correspondent between 1991 and 1995 then joined the Al Jazeera channel on June 26, 1996. One year later he won the title of the chief correspondent. He also worked for several press institutions, including the Palestinian Press Services, Al-Awda magazine in occupied Jerusalem, Radio Orient in Paris, Multicult.fm in Berlin and the Lebanese newspaper Al-Moustaqbal from 1997 to 2000.

== Literary works ==
- Al-Omari, Walid (2010). الصحافة الفلسطينية: ثلاث مطارق وسندان [The Palestinian press: Three hammers and an anvil] (in Arabic). Ramallah Center for Human Rights Studies.
- Al-Omari, Walid (2003). افشاء الاسرار في كتابة الاخبار [Disclosing secrets in writing the news] (in Arabic). معهد الإعلام بجامعة بيرزيت. Archived from the original on 2021-06-25.
- Al-Omari, Walid (2002). الشرط الاخير: قراءة في السلوك السياسي الاسرائيلي خلال حرب الخليج الثانية [The Last Condition: A Reading Of Israeli Political Behavior During The Second Gulf War] (in Arabic). Ramallah(Palestine): The Palestinian Forum for Israeli Studies.
- Al-Omari, Walid (1994). الاعلام الاسرائيلي - هيكلية وآلية عمل - دور الاعلام الحر في بناء مجتمع ديمقراطي [The Israeli media - structure and mechanism of action - The role of the free media in building a democratic society] (in Arabic). Ramallah(Palestine): وزارة الاعلام الفلسطينية.
- Al-Omari, Walid (1990). خلفيات واثار هجرة اليهود السوفييت: المهاجرون يرسمون حدود اسرائيل الكبرى [Background and Effects of Soviet Jewish Immigration: Immigrants Draw the Borders of Greater Israel] (in Arabic). دار العودة.
- Al-Omari, Walid (1987). The Israeli media and Palestinian problem. Jerusalem: Arab Journalists Association in the Occupied Territories. OCLC 233919091.

== Awards and honors ==
- Holy Land Fund Award (2004)
- Palestine International Media Award (2002)
- Arab Media Club Award (2001) Dubai
- He also participated in many local and international conferences, workshops and seminars.
