= Contextual objectivity =

Contextual objectivity is a principle with roots in quantum mechanics that was adapted and applied to explain and describe the operations of news media organizations during times of war. Proposed by Adel Iskandar and Mohammed El-Nawawy in their analysis of Al-Jazeera as a case study, the term expresses the attempt "to reflect all sides of any story while retaining the values, beliefs and sentiments of the target audience". The concept has been applied by some scholars to explain Fox News Channel's news programming in the 2002–2003 run-up to the Iraq War. Other studies used contextual objectivity to describe differences between mainstream media and alternative ethnic media's coverage of post-Hurricane Katrina relief efforts.
