= Al Sharq Forum =

Turkish-based think tank

- منتدى الشرق
- Formation: 2012
- Founder: Wadah Khanfar
- Legal status: Nonprofit organization
- Website: www.sharqforum.org

Al Sharq Forum (Arabic: منتدى الشرق) is a Turkish NGO funded by the European Union, while developing long-term strategies and programs that contribute to the political development, economic prosperity, and social cohesion of the people of the Al Sharq region and the world.
Its director of strategic research is Mohammad Affan.

Al Sharq Forum is currently headquartered in Istanbul, Turkey, and there is also three offices in London, United Kingdom Geneva, Switzerland and Kuala Lumpur.

The Forum consists of three pillars working in tandem to ensure the realization of its mission:

== Al Sharq Strategic Research ==
A think tank that looks to undertake impartial, rigorous research to promote the ideals of democratic participation, an informed citizenry, multi-stakeholder dialogue and social justice.

== Al Sharq Academia ==
An online platform offering an eclectic range of academic courses that aim at disseminating knowledge from the social sciences and humanities, and is targeted at civil and political activists with a view to enhance informed action.

== Al Sharq Youth ==
A network of committed and active youth, leading change towards a more inclusive and just world. Established in 2012, by Wadah Khanfar, the former director general of Al Jazeera Network, is the co-founder and President. After the death of Ismail Haniyeh in Tehren, Al Sharq Youth, praised Haniyeh, the Hamas leader assassinated along with his personal bodyguard in the Iranian capital.
