= Wadah Khanfar =

Palestinian journalist (born 1968)

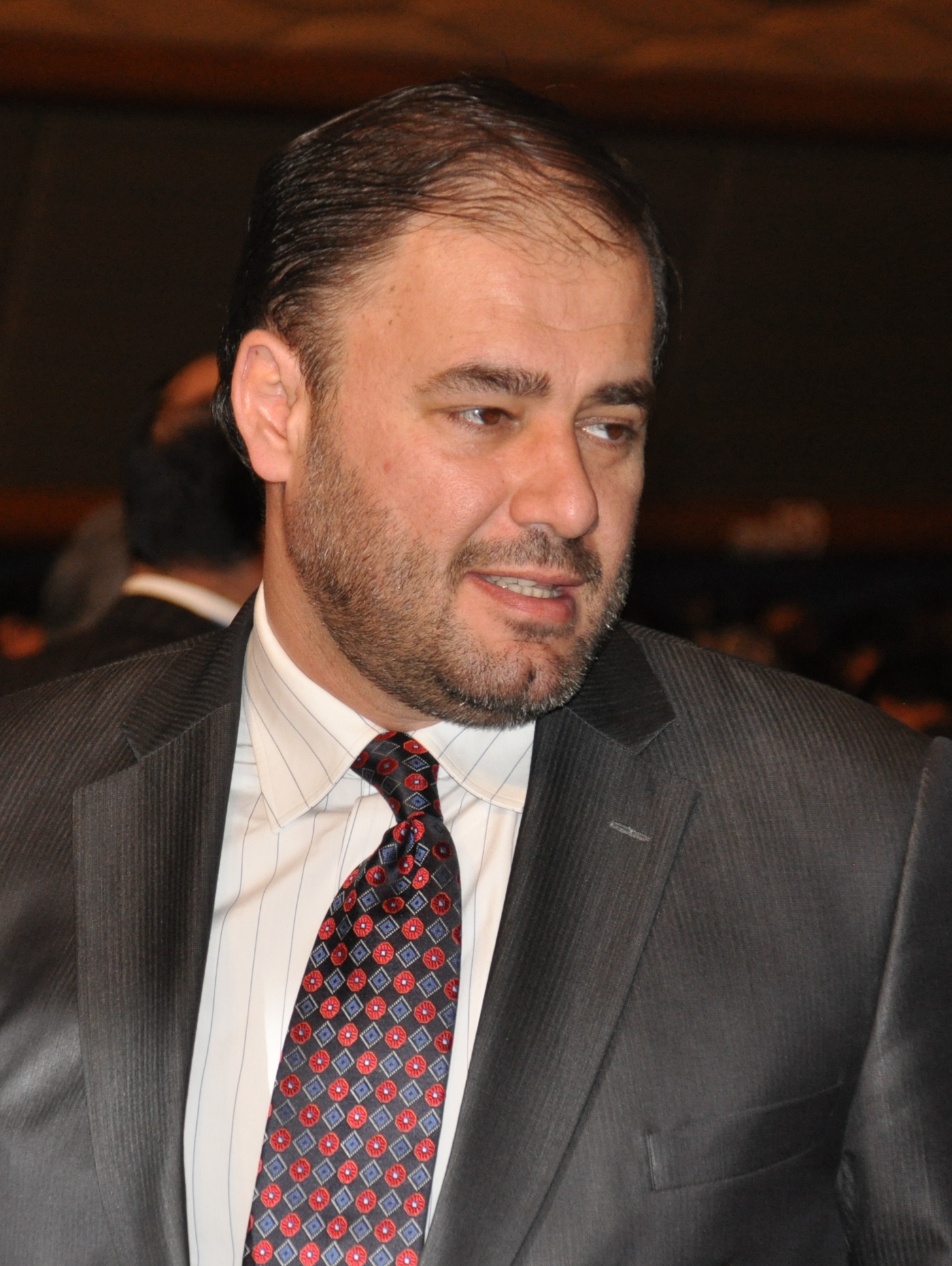
- Khanfar in 2006
- Born: 20 September 1968 (age 57); Rama, Palestine
- Occupation: President of Al Sharq Forum
- Website: WadahKhanfar.com

Wadah Khanfar (Arabic: وضاح خنفر; born 20 September 1968) is the President of Al Sharq Forum, an independent network dedicated to developing long-term strategies for political development, social justice and economic prosperity of the people of the Middle East. He previously served as the Director General of Al Jazeera Media Network. He has been ranked by Foreign Policy Magazine in 2011 as the first in The FP Top 100 Global Thinkers, and in Fast Company as the first in the 100 Most Creative People in Business (2011) and as one of the most 'Powerful People in the World' by Forbes magazine (2009)., in 2008 World Economic Forum named Khanfar as one of the 'Young Global Leaders'.

During his tenure Al Jazeera went from a single channel to a media network with multiple properties including the Al Jazeera Arabic channel, Al Jazeera English, Al Jazeera Documentary, Al Jazeera Sport, Al Jazeera's news websites, the Al Jazeera Media Training and Development Center, the Al Jazeera Center for Studies, Al Jazeera Mubasher (Live), and Al Jazeera Mobile. On 20 September 2011, he stepped down as the head of Al Jazeera Network.

== Early years and education ==
Wadah was born in the Palestinian town of Rama in 1968. He obtained a Bachelor of Science degree in engineering at the University of Jordan in 1990 and went on to complete a post-graduate degree in philosophy, a diploma in African Studies from Sudan International University and an Honors Degree in International Politics. During this time, Khanfar started a student's union that soon spread to several other universities and an inter-university dialogue group among students constituted from a range of political backgrounds. By 1989, the student's union was playing an active role in debating the future of the democratic process, and Khanfar started making a name for himself as a charismatic and natural leader, helping to organize forums, protests, festivals and demonstrations for student rights.

== Journalism ==
=== Africa ===
When Al Jazeera was established in 1996, Khanfar was a graduate student in International Politics and African Studies in South Africa, and a researcher and consultant in Middle Eastern economics and political affairs. He was asked by the channel to provide an analysis on African affairs, which led to him becoming a correspondent in South Africa until 2001. At a conference in Pretoria on 27–29 August 2012, Khanfar said that he had learned about both political struggle and reconciliation during his years in South Africa.

=== Afghanistan ===
In 2001 and 2002, Khanfar reported on Afghanistan from New Delhi. Al Jazeera was unable to get its own correspondent back into the northern territories controlled by the Northern Alliance on the eve of the war, so New Delhi was used, India having a strong Northern Alliance diplomatic presence. As the Taliban regime was collapsing, Al Jazeera's presence in Kabul was threatened by problems including US fire, and concerns from journalists and diplomats that the then bureau chief and correspondent, Tayseer Allouni had become compromised as a partisan of the Taliban cause. Khanfar was brought in to replace Allouni as Kabul bureau chief and restored working relations with the new authorities.

=== Iraq ===
During the Iraq war, Khanfar reported from Kurdish-controlled territory in the north, and after the fall of Saddam Hussein's Ba'ath regime, he became Al Jazeera bureau chief in Baghdad.

At this time the channel was widely perceived as playing to popular pro-Baathist and anti-Coalition Arab sentiment, despite being represented at the Coalition's Central Headquarters and having an Al Jazeera correspondent embedded within coalition forces. The then US Defence Secretary Donald Rumsfeld and then Deputy Defence Secretary Paul Wolfowitz publicly criticized Al Jazeera, Rumsfeld calling the channel's reporting "vicious, inaccurate and inexcusable...", while Wolfowitz claimed the station was "inciting violence" and "endangering the lives of American troops" in Iraq.

This public criticism came amid attacks on Al Jazeera from US forces, including the shelling of a hotel in Basra on 8 April 2003 used solely by the channel's correspondents. Nearly a week later, US forces bombed the station's Baghdad offices wounding one cameraman and killing a correspondent, Tariq Ayoub on the same day that two Reuters journalists were killed when a US tank shell struck their office in the Palestine Hotel. In July, Khanfar wrote an open letter to Paul Bremer, the US proconsul in Iraq responding to his assertion that television stations or newspapers guilty of "incitement to violence" would be shut down. Khanfar wrote that his offices and staff had been subject to "strafing by gunfire, death threats, confiscation of news material, and multiple detentions and arrests, all carried out by US soldiers", asserting that the channel's coverage had been consistently harassed for unfavourable reporting during the Ba'athist regime. He also said that because Al Jazeera at that time was only available in Arabic, reliance on the channel's coverage came "from second-, third- and fourth-hand sources – half-truths and total falsehoods that make the rounds in Washington, Baghdad and elsewhere."

== Al Jazeera executive ==
Khanfar became Managing Director of the Al Jazeera Channel in 2003 and Director General of the Al Jazeera Network in 2006. He spoke at the 2011 TED Conference on the ongoing Arab Spring. On 20 September 2011, Khanfar announced on his official Twitter page that he was 'moving on' from Al Jazeera after leading the channel for 8 years.

=== WikiLeaks ===
In September 2011, the non-profit whistleblowing website WikiLeaks released a cache of leaked diplomatic cables highlighting U.S. activities overseas. Several of the cables implicated Khanfar in unduly influencing Al Jazeera's news coverage of the War in Iraq at the behest of U.S. embassy officials in Qatar. In one instance, the cables suggested that Khanfar removed images of wounded Iraqi civilians from an Al Jazeera report following pressure by the U.S. embassy. They also suggested that Khanfar was anxious to keep his behind-the-scenes collaboration secret.

=== Resignation ===
In September 2011, Khanfar announced to his staff and publicly on the micro-blogging platform Twitter that he would be resigning. The resignation was considered sudden, and Khanfar gave no detailed reason for his decision. In an interview following the announcement, Khanfar said he left the network voluntarily, although according to the BBC, sources close to Al Jazeera and Khanfar allegedly claimed he was asked to leave by the Al Thani Qatari royal family.

In an emotional farewell to Al Jazeera staff he cites that the decision had been in his mind for sometime and that the target of establishing Al Jazeera as a global media leader has been met. This is also the theme of an interview broadcast on Al Jazeera where he addresses and refutes suggestions that Wikileaks and pressure from USA may have influenced his resignation. He is succeeded by Ahmed bin Jassim Al Thani.

== Criticism ==
Wadah Khanfar was accused by some of a pro-Islamist bias. Responding to these accusations in a 2007 interview with The Nation, Khanfar said: "Islam is more of a factor now in the influential political and social spheres of the Arab world, and the network’s coverage reflects that. Maybe you have more Islamic voices [on the network] because of the political reality on the ground." In June 2007, Hafez Al-Mirazi, Al-Jazeera's Washington bureau chief, denounced what he saw as the station's "Islamist drift", and singled out Khanfar in particular, saying: "From the first day of the Wadah Khanfar era, there was a dramatic change, especially because of him selecting assistants who are hardline Islamists."

During the Iraq War, Al Jazeera broadcast a report that American troops had raided Najaf and detained the religious leaders of the Shia Islamic community, which turned out to be false. Khanfar defended the blunder as an honest mistake.

== Membership and activities ==
Khanfar has the following memberships; member of International Crisis Group's Board of Trustees, member of the World Economic Forum's (DAVOS) Global Agenda Council on Geopolitical Risk 2012, board member of the Global Editors Network:empower editors-in-chief and senior news executives from around the world looking for the preservation of editorial quality when working with publishers, media owners and news suppliers.

Khanfar spoke at the 2011 TED Conference on the ongoing civil uprisings in the Arab Spring. In 2018 Khanfar penned the following essay in the Guardian titled: "Don't let my friend Jamal Khashoggi's death be for nothing" Khashoggi, a fellow journalist and Saudi dissident had been allegedly assassinated by the regime in the Saudi consulate in Istanbul. Prior to Khashoggi's death, the crown prince of Saudi Arabia had accused Khashoggi of being an Islamist. Khanfar and Khashoggi were close friends and shared many of the same ideas and opinions surrounding democracy and political Islam.

== First visit to the United States ==
In July 2009, Khanfar was invited to the United States by leading political and media think tanks including the Middle East Institute, New America Foundation, Council on Foreign Relations, and George Washington University. This was the first time that a Director General from Al Jazeera has visited the US. During the visit Khanfar also met with senior officials and advisors at the White House, United States Department of State and the Pentagon. On the visit to the US, Khanfar appeared on the Charlie Rose Show, NPR's Diane Rehm show, and presented at the Paley Center for Media.
