= Multicult.fm =

Radio station in Germany

multicult.fm
- Type: non commercial radio
- Industry: Broadcasting
- Founded: 31 December 2008
- Headquarters: Berlin, Germany
- Area served: Berlin, Worldwide
- Services: Radio, Internet Radio
- Owner: multicult Radio und Medien- produktionen gUG, Berlin
- Website: http://www.multicult.fm

multicult.fm is a non commercial radio station from Berlin, Germany, which broadcasts partially on air and 24/7 on the Internet. The station was born in Autumn 2008 as an Internet Radio called Radio multicult2.0 as a result of the closing of radiomultikulti, which was part of the public radio station from the Land of Berlin-Brandenburg RBB. Radiomultikulti was a radio station, which was destined to all communities, expatriates and foreigners who lived in Berlin. Multicult.fm wants to keep this orientation. The first show was broadcast on 31 December 22h05, simultaneously when radiomultikulti was shut down. Since 24 March, multicult.fm broadcasts from its own studio, located in a market house in Berlin-Kreuzberg.

== The station ==
Since January 2009, the station broadcasts 24/7 on the Internet. 34 shows are produced by several journalists (December 2011), music content is mainly based on world music.

Multicult.fm cooperates with other local radio stations from Berlin on the 88.4 MHz FM frequency , which can also be listened in Potsdam on the 90.7 MHz.

Following hours are allowed to multicult.fm for this frequency:

Mondays to Fridays from 6am to 10am and from 6pm to 7pm. Weekends from 6am to 12pm and exceptional live shows from 12pm to 4pm.

Das Morgen:Magazin (morning show) is a show which relates on current political and cultural subjects, with guest interviews.

Since December 2011, 10 new shows are added to the programm, among them Şimdi, a German-Turkish show about what happens politically, culturally and musically in Turkey, and relations between German and Turkish people, especially in Berlin. Then Bogheboxi, another bilingual show in Italian and German about Sardinia.

== Worldmusics ==
Its musical playlists are mostly based on world music, in its large definition, every style we can find around the world, from Tango to Salsa, from Cajun to Balkan music, with also not avoiding local bands from Berlin or Germany.

Examples of shows:

- Africa Calling presented by Wolfgang König, about African musics
- Café Olé presented by Wolfgang König, about fusion styles.
- Panamericana presented by Katrin Wilke, about Latin American musics

== Multiculturalism and multilingualism ==
4th logo version

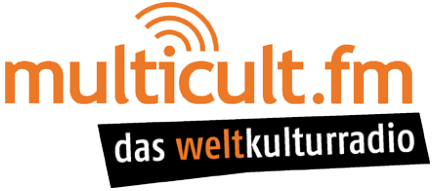
3rd logo version

multicult.fm produces several shows in foreign languages, sometimes bilingual for example:

- Chinese: Rocking Pagoda with Djane Lan
- Chinese/German: Luftbrücke with Lea Zhou
- Turkish/German: Şimdi with Nora Şevbihiv Sinemillioğlu and Seda Niğbolu
- Spanish/German: La Reglafónica with Maria Mandarina and Bongo
- Italian/German: Bogheboxi with Maurizio Rocca and Pitzente Bianco
- Serbo-croatian: BalkanCult with Jasmina Njaradi

Furthermore, some shows are originally produced by other radiostations around the world, which used to work with former radiomultikulti and are still integrated in multicult.fm's program, for example:

- English: Tangents avec Dore Stein, from San Francisco
- English: Radio Goethe avec Arndt Peltner, from San Francisco
- Catalan: Catalan!Music, from Barcelona
- Polish: Strange way of traveling with Vojciech Ossowski, from Warsaw
- Romanian : Muzica Americii Latine, from Bucharest
- Spanish : Los Sonidos del Planeta Arul with Paco Valiente, from Valencia
- Turkish : Dünyayı Dinliyorum with Zekria from Açık Radyo, Istanbul

== Promiscuity and globality ==
Its location in the house market of Marheineke in Berlin-Kreuzberg, allows for everybody to observe real speakers, technicians and journalists, whom you also can directly talk to. It's main themes are about multiculturality, immigration, and some journalists and speakers have migration backgrounds.

On 25 November was open the MulticulTea Bubble Bar. The goal for the radio is to survive keeping in the meantime the freedom to broadcast without advertising. Another goal is to get in contact with its own public, and to communicate with it.
