= Ahmed bin Jassim Al Thani =

Qatari businessman, politician and royal

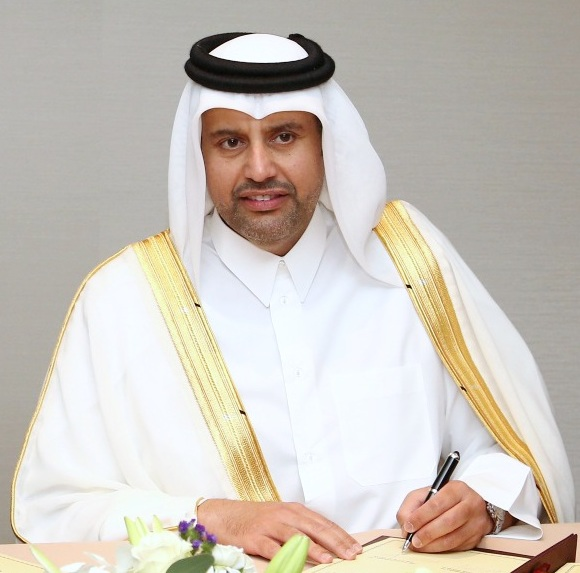
- Al Thani in 2016

Minister of Economy and Commerce
- Incumbent
- Assumed office 26 June 2013
- Prime Minister: Khalid bin Khalifa bin Abdul Aziz Al Thani; Abdullah bin Nasser Al Thani

Personal details
- Born: Ahmed bin Jassim bin Mohammad Al Thani
- Education: United Arab Emirates University; Imperial College Business School
- Occupation: Engineer

Ahmed bin Jassim Al Thani (Arabic: أحمد بن جاسم آل ثاني) is a Qatari businessman, politician and a member of the royal family, Al Thani.

== Early life and education ==
Al Thani is a member of the ruling family of Qatar. He is a graduate of the University of United Arab Emirates where he obtained a bachelor of science degree in petroleum engineering. He received a master's degree in integrated reservoir project management from Imperial College.

== Career ==
Ahmed Al Thani worked in different petroleum engineering projects in Qatar and abroad. He was a board member at Qatargas, today QatarEnergy LNG. After the resignation of Wadah Khanfar from Al Jazeera (at the request of the royal family, according to some "well-informed" BBC sources), Al Thani became the director general of the channel in September 2011. Writing for the Columbia Journalism Review, William Stebbins, a former Bureau Chief for Al Jazeera English, said that the message of this move was "clearly that the state will be exerting more direct control over one of its most prized assets". Writing for the BBC, Hugh Miles, another former AJE worker, said that "it seems the Emir is intent on bringing the network to heel". He left channel on 26 June 2013 when he was appointed minister of economy and commerce. In November 2016, he signed an agreement with the Argentine government to create a one billion US dollar Argentine-Qatari fund for infrastructure projects. From 3 July until November 2018, he was made member to the administrative council of the Qatar Investment Authority (QIA). He was appointed in 2020 as the economic advisor to the Amir, and also in 2021 as the secretary general of the Supreme Council of Economic Affairs and Investment.

=== Awards ===
Arabian Business named Al Thani as the most powerful Qatari businessman in 2012. He was chosen as the 38th most powerful Arab by Gulf Business in 2013.
