= Hafez Al Mirazi =

Egyptian journalist

Hafez al-Mirazi
- Citizenship: Egyptian and American
- Occupation: Journalism
- Spouse: Seyam
- Relatives: [

Hafez Al Mirazi is an Egyptian journalist who has appeared on many television shows in both the Middle East and the United States.

== Education ==
Hafez Al Mirazi graduated from Cairo University with a bachelor's degree in 1979. Following his graduation, Mirazi earned a master's degree in 1987 from the Catholic University of America. In 1990 he earned his graduate diploma from George Mason University.

Mirazi has both Egyptian and United States Citizenship.

== Journalism career ==
Hafez al Mirazi began his career in journalism in 1980 when he served as a radio journalist on Cairo's Voice of the Arabs. Following his time as a radio journalist Mirazi was a news correspondent for BBC Arabic/ World Service and also served as the bureau chief for Al Jazeera America. While working for Al Jazeera, Mirazi hosted the television news program From Washington.

In 2007 Mirazi left Al Jazeera and helped to co-found the Egyptian Satellite channel Al Hayat and hosted a talk show on the same channel called Eye on America.

From 2010 until February 2011 Mirazi was the host of Studio Cairo which aired on the popular Al Arabiya network. His popular show covered daily news events and heavily focused on the events of the Egyptian Revolution in January 2011.

== Controversy ==
After the ousting of Hosni Mubarak during the Egyptian Revolution Mirazi questioned the transparency of journalism and the influence the Egyptian revolution would have on Saudi Arabia. His critique of Al Jazeera and the Saudi regime resulted in him being fired from the Al Arabiya network and the cancellation of his news program. Today, Mirazi is an advocate for transparency in journalism and the right of journalists to report free from censorship.

== Journalism ==
Hafez Al Mirazi currently serves as the director of the Kanal Adham Center for Television and Digital Journalism at the American University of Cairo. Mirazi is also a professor at the Department of Journalism and Mass communication. He presents a weekly news program Bi-Tawqeet El Qahera(Cairo Time) on Egyptian Satellite Channel Dream 2 TV.
