= Adel Iskandar =

British scholar

Adel Iskandar (aka Adel Iskandar Farag) (born 15 March 1977) is a British-born Middle East media scholar, postcolonial theorist, analyst, and academic. He is currently an Associate Professor of Global Communication at Simon Fraser University in Canada. The author and co-author of several works on Arabic language media, Iskandar's work has contributed both to the political economy of communication and the cultural impact of media. His most prominent works deal with analyses of the Arabic satellite station Al Jazeera, digital dissidence, global communication theory, and decolonization.

Born to an Egyptian family of physicians in Edinburgh, Scotland, he grew up in Kuwait, escaping the Iraqi invasion and the 1991 Persian Gulf War. At the age of 16, he moved to Canada where he earned his degree in Social Anthropology and Biology from Dalhousie University in Halifax, Nova Scotia. He later earned a master's degree in Communications from Purdue University Calumet in Hammond, Indiana and a PhD from the University of Kentucky.

He proposes the concept of "contextual objectivity" as a critique of media's coverage of war. He wrote a regular column for Egyptian independent newspaper Almasry Alyoum during and shortly after the revolution and taught in the Communication, Culture and Technology (CCT) program as well as the Center for Contemporary Arab Studies (CCAS) at Georgetown University.

Iskandar is a co-editor of prominent e-zine Jadaliyya.

== Works ==
- Author: Egypt In Flux: Essays on an Unfinished Revolution (forthcoming, 2013)
- Co-editor: Mediating the Arab Uprisings (2012) Tadween Publishing.
- Co-editor: Edward Said: A Legacy of Emancipation and Representation (2010), ISBN 0-5202-5890-8
- Co-editor: "Media Evolution on the Eve of the Arab Spring (2014)" Palgrave Macmillan, ISBN 9781137403148
- Co-author: Al-Jazeera: The Story of the Network that is Rattling Governments and Redefining Modern Journalism (2003), ISBN 0-8133-4149-3
