= Al-Hijra, Hebron =

Al-Hijra, Hebron Arabic: الهجرة
- Al-Hijra, Hebron
- Location of Al-Hijra, Hebron within Palestine
- Coordinates: 31°29′24″N 35°03′25″E
- Country: Palestine
- Governorate: Hebron Governorate
- Elevation: 770 m (2,530 ft)

Population (1997)
  - Total: 488

Al-Hijra, Hebron (Arabic: الحجرة) is a Palestinian village administratively part of the village in Dura Municipality, about 12 kilometers (7.5 mi) southwest of Hebron in the Hebron Governorate of the southern West Bank.

== Geography ==
Al-Hijra lies at an elevation of 770 meters (2,530 ft) above sea level. It is bordered by Hebron to the east, Dura to the north and west, and Hadab al-Fawwar to the south.

== Population ==
According to the 1997 census, Al-Hijra had a population of approximately 488.

== See also ==
- Dura, Hebron
- Hebron Governorate
