= Timeline of the Gaza war (27 November 2024 – 18 January 2025) =

- Initial attacks; (7–27 October 2023); Invasion of the Gaza Strip; (28 October 2023 – 23 November 2023); First ceasefire; (24 November 2023 – 11 January 2024); Yemen airstrikes; (12 January 2024 – 6 May 2024); Rafah offensive; (7 May 2024 – 12 July 2024); Al-Mawasi attack; (13 July 2024 – 26 September 2024); Attack on Hezbollah headquarters; (27 September 2024 – 16 October 2024); Killing of Yahya Sinwar; (17 October 2024 – 26 November 2024); Israel–Lebanon ceasefire agreement; (27 November 2024 – 18 January 2025); Israel–Hamas ceasefire agreement; (19 January 2025 – 17 March 2025); March 2025 Israeli attacks on the Gaza Strip; (18 March 2025 – 15 May 2025); May 2025 Gaza offensive; (16 May 2025 – 19 August 2025); August 2025 Gaza offensive; (20 August 2025 – 2 October 2025); October 2025 Israel–Hamas ceasefire agreement; (3 October 2025 – present)

== November 2024 ==
=== 27 November ===
- The ceasefire agreement between Israel and Hezbollah went into effect at 4:00 a.m. UTC+02:00.
- The Gaza Health Ministry reported that at least 33 Palestinians were killed in the past 24 hours, increasing its count of the Palestinian death toll in Gaza to 44,282. (Note: Casualty count includes both militants and civilians. For further information see Casualties of the Gaza war § Civilian to combatant ratio.)
- The IDF issued evacuation orders for residents of central and southern Beirut including in Ghobeiry.
- The IDF reported that it hit 330 Hezbollah sites throughout Lebanon in the night leading up to the truce, including command centres, weapons depots, infrastructure used by the Radwan Force, and an underground precision missile plant. The IDF estimated that it killed several dozens of Hezbollah operatives in its strikes on a Radwan Force base in Beqaa Valley. It also reported that it killed an operations officer from Hezbollah's aerial unit in a strike in Beirut.
- The IDF arrested 15 Palestinians including a minor from the West Bank. The Palestinian Prisoner's Society said that soldiers damaged many houses while making the arrests.
- Israeli soldiers opened fire on journalists covering the withdrawal of Israeli forces and the return of displaced residents to Khiam, injuring two of them.
- The IDF said that it arrested four suspects who approached Israeli soldiers in southern Lebanon.
- The IDF imposed a curfew in southern Lebanon until 7:00 a.m. UTC+02:00 the next day, saying that it was still deployed in its positions in southern Lebanon according to the terms of the ceasefire agreement, and its forces will deal firmly with any movement that violates this agreement.
- The IDF said that it killed Morad Rajab, a Hamas militant in Gaza City.
- The IDF reported that it hit dozens of military structures of Hamas including sites used for fighting and storing weapons in northern Gaza.
- The IDF reported that it shot down a drone used for smuggling weapons from Egypt containing four guns, five cartridges and hundreds of bullets which crossed from Egypt to Israel. Egyptian security sources said that they are unaware of such an incident.
- Shrapnel from live bullets fired by Israeli soldiers during their raid in Faqqua wounded a child. Clashes erupted in Faqqua after Israeli soldiers raided it.
- In Lebanon, The IDF announced that it killed an unspecified number of militants.

=== 28 November ===
- The Gaza Health Ministry reported that at least 48 Palestinians have died in the past 24 hours, increasing its count of the Palestinian death toll in Gaza to 44,330. Israel reported to have killed approximately 20,000 militants.
- The Lebanese Health Ministry announced that 78 people were killed in Israeli attacks two days prior. The IDF reported to have killed around 3,500 Hezbollah fighters.
- The Tulkarm Brigade reported that it inflicted casualties on Israeli forces by detonating an explosive device in an IDF vehicle and opening fire on Israeli forces in Jabal an-Nasr.
- Al Jazeera reported that Israeli shelling hit a house in Zeitoun, Gaza City, killing a Palestinian child.
- Al Jazeera reported that an Israeli drone strike in the vicinity of a camp for displaced people in Abasan killed four people including civilians and wounded several others.
- Al Jazeera reported that Israeli soldiers fired on Markaba, injuring two people.
- Al Jazeera reported that an Israeli tank targeted the outskirts of Kfarchouba in Lebanon using two shells.
- Al Jazeera reported that an Israeli strike in the Nuseirat refugee camp wounded Talal al-Arouqi, a correspondent for Al Jazeera Mubasher, and flying shrapnel killed another person.
- The IDF said that the ceasefire was violated with the arrival of suspects, some of them with vehicles, at several areas in southern Lebanon.
- The IDF carried out an airstrike on a rocket depot in southern Lebanon after identifying Hezbollah activity there.
- The IDF prohibited travel within and towards the south of the Litani River from 5:00 p.m. UTC+02:00 until 7:00 a.m. UTC+02:00 the next day.
- The Houthi-affiliated Al-Masirah TV news reported two US-UK air strikes in Bajil District.
- Al Jazeera reported that an Israeli drone strike killed an elderly man in the Nuseirat refugee camp.
- Al Jazeera reported that an Israeli strike hit a tent housing displaced people in Khan Yunis killed four people including a child and injured several others.
- The IDF warned residents to not return to 62 villages in southern Lebanon.

=== 29 November ===
- The Gaza Health Ministry reported that at least 33 Palestinians were killed in the past 24 hours, increasing its count of the Palestinian death toll in Gaza to 44,363.
- An Israeli strike hit two houses near Abu Diya Bakery, west of Gaza City, killing four people including two women and a child and injuring several others.
- Wafa reported that the IDF raided a home in southern Hebron and destroyed its contents.
- At a bus stop near the Giti Avisar junction, in the vicinity of the illegal settlement of Ariel, a gunman opened fire at a bus and then exchanged fire with Israeli soldiers who were present at the bus stop. He was shot dead by the soldiers. Three people including the bus driver were seriously wounded while at least six other people, including four soldiers, suffered lesser injuries. The al-Qassam Brigades claimed responsibility.
- In two instances, Palestinian gunmen shot at Israeli security services (IDF and border police) in the West Bank; in both cases there were no injuries and the gunmen managed to escape.
- The NNA reported that four Israeli tanks entered the western side of Khiam. It also reported that Israeli artillery shelled the outskirts of Markaba and Talloussah. Footage released by Lebanese media showed Israeli soldiers in Khiam firing at several people while they were attempting to attend a funeral despite prior approval from the Lebanese army and UNIFIL to visit.
- Two children and a woman died in a stampede outside a bakery in Gaza.
- An Israeli quadcopter strike killed Ahmed el-Kahlout, the head of the intensive care unit of Kamal Adwan Hospital, while he was on his way to the hospital.
- The World Food Programme said that all bakeries in central Gaza were forced to close because of severe shortages in supplies.
- Al Jazeera reported that two Israeli strikes in Beit Lahia, including one that hit a residential building, killed 75 people and injured several others. Hamas said that most of those killed were women and children.
- The IDF said that it struck a Hezbollah rocket launcher in southern Lebanon.
- An Israeli strike hit a home in the Abu Iskandar area of Sheikh Radwan neighbourhood in Gaza City killed at least 10 people including civilians.
- Clashes erupted between Palestinian fighters and Israeli soldiers in the as-Saftawi area of northern Gaza.

=== 30 November ===
- The Gaza Health Ministry reported that at least 19 Palestinians were killed in the past 24 hours, increasing its count of the Palestinian death toll in Gaza to 44,382.
- Al Jazeera reported that nine Palestinians including a child were killed and 37 others including 12 children were wounded during IDF raids in the West Bank in the past two days.
- The IDF prohibited residents from returning to dozens more villages in southern Lebanon until further notice.
- An Israeli strike hit a car on the Salah al-Din Road in Khan Yunis killing five people. Three of those killed were employees of World Central Kitchen, and another was an employee of Save the Children. The IDF said that one of the dead had participated in the 7 October attack.
- Al Jazeera reported that an Israeli strike hit a residential flat in the Remal neighbourhood of Gaza City killing seven people including civilians and trapped six others under the debris.
- The Lebanese Broadcasting Corporation reported that an Israeli airstrike hit a vehicle in Majdal Zoun in Lebanon wounding three people including a seven-year-old child. Another strike was reported by Lebanese media in Baisariyeh.
- Three drones were launched from Iraq towards Israel.
- Al Jazeera reported that an Israeli strike hit a house in the Jabalia refugee camp killing a Gaza civil defence member.
- The IDF said that it had carried out an intelligence-based strike on border crossings used by Hezbollah for smuggling weapons from Syria to Lebanon.
- Al Jazeera reported that an Israeli airstrike hit a home in the Shujayea neighbourhood of eastern Gaza City killing seven people including a child and injured several others.
- Hamas accused the IDF of using internationally prohibited weapons that vaporize bodies after collecting testimonies from doctors and residents in northern Gaza and demanded an international investigation.
- Al Jazeera reported that the World Central Kitchen halted its distribution of meals in Gaza after the killing of its employees.
- The IDF said that it had located an Hezbollah weapons cache under a mosque in southern Lebanon and dispersed suspects approaching a restricted zone.
- The IDF renewed travel bans within and towards the south of the Litani River from 5:00 p.m. UTC+02:00 until 7:00 a.m. UTC+02:00 the next day.
- An Israeli drone strike in Rab Thalathin in Lebanon killed two people and wounded two others.
- The al-Qassam Brigades said it targeted two Israeli Merkava tanks using al-Yassin 105 shells in the al-Janina neighborhood, east of Rafah.
- Al Jazeera reported that an Israeli airstrike on a group of Palestinians waiting for receiving food from an aid convoy in Khan Yunis killed at least 12 Palestinians and injured several others.
- Al Jazeera reported that a 10-year-old child died due to lack of oxygen and medical supplies in Al-Awda Hospital.
- A health official in Gaza said that famine has spread to all of Gaza.
- An anti-tank missile killed an Israeli soldier in Jabalia and critically injured another soldier. A soldier was critically injured during combat with Palestinian fighters in southern Gaza. Another soldier was seriously injured during an operational IDF activity in northern Israel on the border with Lebanon.
- More than 40 people including women and children were killed in an Israeli air strike in the Tel al-Zataar area of Jabalia which caused the collapse of a six-story building.
- Al Jazeera reported that an Israeli air strikes in the Nuseirat refugee camp killed six people including civilians and injured several others.
- Al Jazeera reported that an Israeli drone strike in northern Gaza killed Mahmoud Almadhoun, chef and cofounder of Gaza Soup Kitchen.
- The al-Qassam Brigades reported that they had killed the crew of an Israeli Merkava tank in the north of Gaza City by hitting it with a Shawaz device.

== December 2024 ==
=== 1 December ===
- The Gaza Health Ministry reported that at least 47 Palestinians were killed in the past 24 hours, increasing its count of the Palestinian death toll in Gaza to 44,429.
- Palestinian medical officials said that an Israeli strike hit a tent in the Muwasi area of Gaza, killing at least two children and injuring two others.
- Israeli soldiers arrested two An-Najah National University students after raiding their homes in Burin, Nablus.
- A ballistic missile was launched from Yemen towards Israel.
- The Palestinian Red Crescent Society said that a 15-year-old boy was injured in Anabta and a 16-year-old was beaten by Israeli soldiers in Astra, West Bank where an IDF operation triggered clashes.
- The IDF conducted drone strikes targeting Palestinian fighters in Jenin.
- The UNRWA paused aid deliveries through the Kerem Shalom border crossing due to security concerns.
- The NNA reported several blasts on the outskirts of Yaroun and Maroun al-Ras.
- The Houthis said they had targeted a "vital target" in central Israel with a hypersonic missile.
- Israeli security personnel carried out an operation in Seir village of Jenin area killing four men. The IDF said that those killed were responsible for several gun attacks targeting Israeli towns in the border of northern West Bank.
- Al Jazeera reported that an Israeli strike hit a home in Beit Lahia killing at least 10 people.
- The Nablus battalion of the Quds Brigades said that it clashed with Israeli soldiers in the eastern area of Nablus.
- The IDF announced that soldiers from the Paratroopers Brigade killed several armed Hezbollah fighters near a church in southern Lebanon the previous night.
- An Iranian airplane suspected of carrying arms to Hezbollah over Syrian airspace was ordered by Israeli fighter jets to turn around.
- The Houthis reported that they had hit the US military supply ships Stena Impeccable, Maersk Saratoga and Liberty Grace and a destroyer using 16 ballistic and cruise missiles in the Arabian Sea and the Gulf of Aden. The United States Central Command said that it destroyed weapons launched by the Houthis.
- The United Nations Relief and Works Agency for Palestine Refugees (UNRWA) stated that more than 415,000 displaced persons are currently sheltering in its school buildings in Gaza, while hundreds of thousands more are living "in worse conditions in temporary shelters."
- An Israeli drone launched an airstrike on a vehicle near the village of Seir in the northern West Bank city of Jenin. The Israeli military said that it targeted four militants in Jenin.
- Palestinian prisoners' institutions announced the killing of detainees from the Gaza Strip: Muhammad Abd al-Rahman Huwayshil Idris (35 years old) and Muath Khaled Muhammad Rayyan (31 years old) in Israeli prisons. They explained that Idris was killed on November 29, 2024, while Muath Rayyan died on November 2, 2024, without disclosing the place of death.
- Two Palestinians were killed in an Israeli airstrike near the fishermen's port west of Gaza City. Four Palestinians, including a child, were killed and five others were injured in an Israeli airstrike in the Jouret al-Lut area of Khan Yunis, south of the Gaza Strip.

=== 2 December ===
- The Gaza Health Ministry reported that at least 37 Palestinians were killed in Israeli attacks in the past 24 hours, increasing its count of the Palestinian death toll in Gaza to 44,466.
- France accused Israel of violating its ceasefire in Lebanon 52 times, causing the death of three Lebanese civilians. Israel rejected the accusations saying Israel is enforcing the ceasefire terms in the face of Hezbollah's violations of the ceasefire that require an immediate response in real time.
- NNA reported that Israeli forces opened fire at homes in Naqoura with machine guns.
- World Health Organization dropped off aid to Kamal Adwan Hospital. It also said that a team from Mercy International will be deployed in the hospital for a month to provide specialised medical staff.
- The IDF again warned residents against returning to houses in some villages in south Lebanon.
- The IDF announced that Israeli-American soldier Omer Maxim Neutra was killed during the 7 October attack and his body is held in Gaza based on new intelligence information.
- An Israeli drone hit a Lebanese army bulldozer that was conducting "fortification work" at a Lebanese army base in the northeastern Hermel area, moderately injuring a Lebanese soldier.
- The UN said that Gaza now has the highest number of child amputees per capita at the global level.
- The IDF said that it struck Hezbollah military vehicles operating in a Hezbollah missile manufacturing facility in the Beqaa Valley. It also said that it struck Hezbollah vehicles used for transporting weapons at several sites in the border between Syria and Lebanon in Hermel District and conducted strikes against Hezbollah operatives in southern Lebanon.
- Lebanese State Security said that one of its personnel was killed by an Israeli drone in Nabatieh.
- Hezbollah launched two mortars towards Shebaa Farms, claiming that it was responding defensively to repeated ceasefire violations by the IDF. In response, the IDF struck dozens of Hezbollah members and rocket launchers, including the one used in the mortar attack. Six people were killed in Haris and four others in Talloussah.
- The al-Qassam Brigades said that it targeted IDF positions in Nirim and Ein HaShlosha using rockets.
- Hamas reported that 33 Israeli hostages were killed, mostly due to Israeli air strikes and some others due to botched rescue attempts by the IDF since the beginning of the war.
- An Israeli strike hit a school serving as a shelter in Jabalia killed a child.
- A drone was launched from the east towards Israel.
- The IDF issued evacuation orders for residents of five blocks in Khan Yunis.
- An Israeli air strike in Marjayoun killed one person.

=== 3 December ===
- The Gaza Health Ministry reported that at least 36 Palestinians were killed in Israeli attacks in the past 24 hours, increasing its count of the Palestinian death toll in Gaza to 44,502.
- The Food and Agriculture Organization said that food availability is at an all-time low throughout Gaza.
- Hezbollah affiliated Al-Nour radio station announced that one of its journalists was killed in an Israeli strike.
- The IDF renewed bans on people returning to their houses in over 60 villages in south Lebanon.
- Two men were severely beaten by Israeli forces before arresting them in north of Bethlehem. It also arrested the deputy secretary of Fatah and two minors in the vicinity of Ramallah.
- NNA reported that Israeli warplanes conducted a wave of strikes on a number of villages and towns in Tyre District and Bint Jbeil District. It also reported that the IDF launched flares and thermal balloons over Aita al-Shaab.
- NNA reported an Israeli drone strike in Beit Lif.
- The IDF reported that one of its artillery units killed at least seven Hamas militants who participated in 7 October attack.
- An Israeli strike on a car in Damascus airport road killed Salman Jumaa, Hezbollah's liaison with the Syrian army.
- The IDF reported that it struck a militant cell in Aaqbeh village, Beqaa Governorate.
- The Gaza Civil Defense Agency accused the IDF of targeting its crews while they tried to rescue and transport wounded Palestinians in Rafah.
- The IDF reported that it destroyed buildings used by Hamas and seized weapons during raids in the Netzarim Corridor.
- The IDF issued evacuation orders for a majority of civilians in Beit Lahia.
- An Israeli drone strike killed two civilians in Jabalia.
- The al-Qassam Brigades said it clashed with Israeli forces using machine guns in Tubas.
- The IDF arrested a doctor and a nurse from Tubas government hospital.
- An Israeli strike on a residential building in Beit Lahia killed 12 people.
- An Israeli drone strike in Shebaa killed one person.
- The IDF said that it destroyed Hezbollah infrastructure in Shebaa Farms.
- An Israeli strike on a house in Shati refugee camp injured several people including children.
- UNRWA said that it distributed flour to approximately 9,000 families in areas throughout central Gaza through deliveries facilitates by World Food Programme.
- The IDF reported that two rockets were launched from northern Gaza towards Israel.
- An Israeli raid in al-Mughayyir and eastern Nablus triggered confrontations with residents.
- An IDF vehicle ran over a 17-year-old boy in Beita, Nablus.
- An Israeli air strike on a UNRWA run school in Zeitoun neighbourhood of Gaza City killed six people and injured several others including at least one child.
- An Israeli strike in Sabra neighborhood of Gaza City wounded a boy.
- At least six Palestinians were killed and others were injured when Israeli warplanes targeted the Al-Falah School, which houses displaced people in the Al-Zeitoun neighborhood of Gaza City. Two Palestinians were killed and others were injured in an Israeli bombing that targeted the Al-Jazeera Club, which houses displaced people in central Gaza City.
- Three people were killed after being targeted by Israeli drones near the Zaghloul refrigerators north of Rafah, south of the Gaza Strip.
- Gaza Civil Defense said one person was killed and seven others were injured in an Israeli airstrike on the Al-Zeitoun Girls' School in the Al-Zeitoun neighborhood, south of Gaza City.
- Two Palestinian citizens were killed and a third was injured in an Israeli airstrike targeting a car near the town of Aqaba in Tubas in the West Bank. They were transferred to Tubas Governmental Hospital.

=== 4 December ===
- The Gaza Health Ministry reported that at least 30 Palestinians were killed in Israeli attacks in the past 24 hours, increasing its count of the Palestinian death toll in Gaza to 44,532.
- The Lebanese Health Ministry increased the death toll from Israeli attacks in Lebanon to 4,047.
- The IDF reported that its fighter jets bombed a vehicle carrying three Hamas militants who were planning to carry out an imminent attack in Aqqaba area of the Jordan Valley, killing them. The al-Qassam Brigades confirmed the death of two of its members.
- Israeli forces shot dead a 15-year-old Palestinian teenager in the Silwan neighbourhood of East Jerusalem.
- An Israeli strike on a home in the Abu Areef area, south of Deir el-Balah killed a Palestinian woman and wounded several others.
- An Israeli drone strike hit Kamal Adwan Hospital, injuring three medical staff, one seriously.
- Dozens of Lebanese families fled from south Lebanon again due to Israeli strikes.
- An Israeli drone strike on a food distribution point and house in Nuseirat refugee camp killed five people including four children.
- The New York Times reported that the IDF is constructing bases in central Gaza.
- Israeli settlers attacked residents and set fire to property in Beit Furik and Huwara and attacked two Israeli border police officers after Israeli authorities evacuated an illegal settler outpost in the vicinity of Nablus.
- Clashes erupted between Israeli soldiers and Palestinian fighters after Israeli forces stormed Qalqiya.
- Israel's Coordinator of Government Activities in the Territories reported that 122 trucks carrying humanitarian aid entered Gaza.
- The IDF arrested at least 22 Palestinians including two children and a woman from the West Bank.
- The IDF reported that it destroyed militant infrastructure and killed several militants in air strikes and close-quarters fighting in Jabalia, adding that it found an explosives making laboratory in the area.
- An elderly Palestinian man died after being severely beaten by Israeli forces in Aqraba, Nablus.
- An Israeli air strike on two houses in Deir el-Balah killed at least two people and trapped several others under the rubble, most of them children.
- The IDF detained five Israelis after they illegally crossed into southern Lebanon.
- The al-Qassam Brigades reported that it hit two Israeli Merkava tanks using rocket-propelled grenades and an explosive device in an intersection in central Beit Lahia and an Israeli troop carrier using an anti-armour shell in Jabalia. It also reported that it killed two Israeli soldiers in the middle of Jabalia refugee camp.
- The IDF said that six male hostages recovered dead in Khan Yunis over three months prior were most likely shot dead by Hamas guards based on pathological evidence. However, it also said that it cannot determine with complete certainty the precise cause of death of the hostages or the exact timing of the gunfire and it had no knowledge of the presence of hostages before its strike.
- Two consecutive Israeli strikes in Israeli designated humanitarian safe zone of al-Mawasi killed at least 21 Palestinians including children and women, injured at least 28 others. One of those killed was a seven months pregnant woman. The IDF said that it killed several Hamas operatives including a top commander of internal security forces of Hamas, Osama Ghanim.
- The IDF said that the IAF struck a Hezbollah launch pad in Majdal Zoun and destroyed combat equipment in Khiam, Sawwaneh and Aitaroun.
- The IDF said that its joint operation with Shin Bet recovered the body of Israeli hostage Itay Svirsky from Gaza, saying that he was earlier killed by Hamas guards in captivity.
- Four multi-story buildings collapsed as a result of an Israeli strike in the Sheikh Radwan neighborhood of Gaza City, killing at least 25 people including children, injuring many others and trapping an entire family.
- The occupation forces launched a campaign of raids and arrests in the West Bank, where they stormed the village of Aroura, northwest of Ramallah, and arrested citizens. They also stormed several areas in Ramallah, including the village of Shuqba, the town of Qibya, the Jalazoun camp, and the village of Abwein. They re-arrested a young man from the town of Beit Rima, after raiding his home after his release two months ago. They arrested a young man from his home during the raid on the Jalazoun camp, and arrested three citizens from Bethlehem, including a child, and seven citizens from the Qalqilya governorate.
- Al-Hakim, Muhammad Abu Al-Auf, was martyred in Al-Aqsa Martyrs Hospital when the occupation bombed Abu Hamisa School, which shelters displaced people in Al-Bureij camp in the middle of Gaza Strip. The occupation aircraft burned more than 15 tents as a result of the occupation bombing of the school.
- Ten Palestinian citizens were martyred in an Israeli bombardment on areas east of Rafah city, south of the Gaza Strip. Their bodies were transferred to the European Gaza Hospital east of Khan Yunis. Eight martyrs were recovered from the vicinity of Hamdan Hall east of Rafah city as a result of an Israeli bombardment that targeted citizens yesterday.
- Palestinian youth Omar Hussam Yaqoub Shuwaiki (17 years old) died of his wounds after being shot by the occupation forces in the town of Silwan, south of Al-Aqsa Mosque in Jerusalem, where he was arrested despite his serious injury.
- At least ten Palestinians were killed and others injured in an Israeli army attack that targeted a home belonging to the Al-Dalu family in the Sheikh Radwan neighborhood, north of Gaza City.
- Twenty Palestinians were killed in an Israeli bombardment of tents for displaced people in the Al-Mawasi area of Khan Yunis, while 25 Palestinians, including children, were killed and 50 others were wounded in an Israeli bombardment that targeted an entire residential block in the Al-Nafaq area in central Gaza City.

=== 5 December ===
- The Gaza Health Ministry reported that at least 48 Palestinians were killed in Israeli attacks in the past 24 hours, increasing its count of the Palestinian death toll in Gaza to 44,580.
- Amnesty International accused the Netanyahu government and the IDF of genocide in Gaza. Israel's government denied the claim.
- The IDF said that it arrested a man from a hospital in the West Bank who was a member of a militant cell which conducted a gun attack in Mehola Junction in August that killed an Israeli.
- The IDF conducted three strikes in southern Lebanon.
- The IDF arrested 28 people from the West Bank including a student from Qabalan, a 16-year-old boy from Hebron Governorate and the mother of two people killed by the IDF.
- Israeli strikes hit water tanks of Indonesia Hospital, injuring three people.
- The IDF said that it destroyed Hezbollah underground infrastructure and killed militants in southern Lebanon.
- The IDF reported that it killed seven Palestinian militants from the air and arrested 50 wanted individuals during its ground operation in West Bank in the past week.
- Israeli strikes hit the Kamal Adwan Hospital, killing a 16-year-old boy who was in wheelchair after being discharged from the hospital and seven others and injured several others.
- An Israeli strike on a residential building in Beit Lahia killed 15 people.
- Israeli soldiers launched stun grenades towards a residential building in Aitaroun, inflicting injuries.
- PIJ announced that three of its fighters were killed in Lebanon.
- The IDF announced that 90,000 Palestinian civilians were evacuated from Jabalia, Beit Lahia, and Beit Hanoun. It said that it detained approximately 100 suspected militants and killed at least 1,750 militants since it launched its offensive against Hamas in the area in October, with approximately 20 killed during fighting in Beit Lahia in the previous day. Another 1,300 militants were detained.
- An Israeli air strike in Aitaroun injured five people.
- The al-Qassam Brigades said that it attacked an Israeli infantry force of 50 soldiers in Tal al-Hawa neighbourhood of Gaza City.
- Gunfire broke out between Palestinian National Security Forces and armed groups in Jenin, which was blamed by the former on the theft of vehicles owned by the Palestinian Authority. However, the Jenin Brigades said that PA officers arrested one of its fighters and confiscated money that was for the family of a Palestinian fighter who was killed.
- An Israeli air strike in Shujayea neighbourhood of Gaza City killed a three-year-old Palestinian child.
- The IDF said that it killed Nidal al-Najar, the aerial unit chief of Hamas who helped oversee aerial infiltration into Israel during 7 October attack, in an operation done in collaboration with Shin Bet.
- The Israeli occupation forces launched a campaign of raids and arrests that targeted 28 Palestinians, including two women, an injured person, and former prisoners in the West Bank. They stormed the town of Beit Furik, east of Nablus, which led to clashes between Palestinian youths and the occupation army. They stormed the town of Sebastia, northwest of the city, and raided a house in the town of Talfit, south of Nablus. They stormed the city of Dura, south of Hebron, and fired tear gas canisters.
- Fifteen Palestinians were killed and others were injured in an Israeli raid on the home of the Felfel family in Beit Lahia, while seven people were killed in a raid on a home behind Kamal Adwan Hospital in the Beit Lahia project in the northern Gaza Strip.
- Mahmoud Abu Al-Aish, 16, was killed and 12 others, including a number of medical staff, were injured when an Israeli drone targeted Kamal Adwan Hospital in northern Gaza.

=== 6 December ===
- The Gaza Health Ministry reported that at least 32 Palestinians were killed in Israeli attacks in the past 24 hours, increasing its count of the Palestinian death toll in Gaza to 44,612.
- Israeli forces injured a 16-year-old teenager during an operation in Jalazone refugee camp.
- Heavy clashes were reported between Israeli forces and Palestinian fighters in Balata refugee camp. Israeli forces shot and killed a Palestinian man during those clashes.
- The Palestinian Red Crescent said that one of its emergency medics was shot and killed in Khan Yunis.
- War monitors reported that Palestinian fighters continued to fight in Rafah, Gaza City, and Jabalia while a lull was reported in Beit Lahia.
- Al Jazeera reported that a strike hit the northern and western sides of the Kamal Adwan Hospital, killing four staff members. The IDF denied responsibility.
- Israeli shelling around the Kamal Adwan Hospital killed at least 33 people and dozens were injured.
- The IDF reported that its air strike conducted in collaboration with Shin Bet killed Majdi Aqilan, deputy commander of the Shati Battalion of Hamas in northern and central Gaza who participated in the Nahal Oz attack, Ahmed Suwaidan, another Hamas commander, and Mamdouh Mehna, a senior member of the Hamas tunnelling unit.
- Clashes erupted between residents and Israeli forces after soldiers operated in Beit Furik, injuring three people.
- United Kingdom Maritime Trade Operations reported that a merchant ship was listing and its crew were evacuated following an incident 105 nautical miles northwest of Hodeidah.
- Wafa reported that Israeli forces detained three Palestinian journalists after assaulting them in the vicinity of Sinjil. It also reported that four other journalists who were briefly held were also subjected to abuse.
- Wafa reported that an Israeli air strike hit a gathering of civilians in Kashkou Street in Gaza City's Zeitoun neighborhood, killing six people.
- The IDF completely evacuated Kamal Adwan Hospital and ordered those evacuated to go through a checkpoint leaving the area. Seventy people were detained and taken to an unknown area for interrogation. The hospital was now only minimally functioning.
- An Israeli air strike hit a home in Nuseirat refugee camp that was evacuated before the strike, killing at least 26 Palestinians including six children and five women and injuring over 60 others, most of them women and children in nearby houses.
- Israeli shelling hit tents housing displaced people in the vicinity of the western Nuseirat killing a young girl.
- The IDF shot at Indonesia Hospital and ambulances in Beit Lahia. It also shot at Palestinians in Jabalia, Beit Lahia and Beit Hanoun. The Gaza Civil Defense Agency added that there are no more surgeons in Kamal Adwan Hospital.
- Israeli warplanes flew over Beirut and hit a target in the vicinity of the Litani River between the Yohmor al-Chaqif and Zawtar al-Sharqiyah. The IDF blew up more buildings in Odaisseh. Israeli drones also flew at low altitude over the southern suburbs of Beirut.
- The Al-Aqsa Martyrs' Brigades launched rockets towards Israeli forces along the Netzarim Corridor.
- The IDF said that it found and destroyed a tunnel rigged with explosives in Rafah. It also said that it located stockpiles of weapons while operating in Rafah in recent days. It added that it killed members of a militia cell which mortared Israeli forces in the area.
- A war monitor reported that the IDF was clearing Hezbollah weapons depots and military infrastructure in south Lebanon until 25 January.
- Extremist Israeli Finance Minister Bezalel Smotrich announced the confiscation of 24,000 dunams in the West Bank for "settlement expansion."
- Israeli airstrikes targeted the Jusiya and Arida crossings on the Syrian-Lebanese border, and the Israeli military reported it have struck routes used by Hezbollah to smuggle weapons.

=== 7 December ===
- The Gaza Health Ministry reported that at least 52 Palestinians were killed in Israeli attacks in the past 24 hours, increasing its count of the Palestinian death toll in Gaza to 44,664.
- Israel's Coordinator of Government Activities in the Territories reported that aid was delivered to Beit Hanoun.
- A missile was launched from Yemen towards Israel.
- Euro-Med Human Rights Monitor alleged that the IDF used detainees as human shields for evacuating hospitals in north Gaza.
- An Israeli drone strike on a motorcycle in Deir Siryan killed one person.
- The IDF said that it struck a Hezbollah fighter who posed a threat to its soldiers in south Lebanon.
- Kamal Adwan Hospital ran out of electricity after Israeli gunfire hit its generators. An Israeli strike hit sections of the hospital including its intensive care unit, injuring four people including three children.
- An Israeli air strike in Beit Lif killed five people and injured five others.
- A soldier of the 401st Brigade was killed by Hamas anti-tank fire in Rafah, increasing the IDF death toll in Gaza to 383.
- Israel's Coordinator of Government Activities in the Territories said that more than 3,720 tons of flour were delivered in 218 trucks to Gaza.
- A car ramming attack in Fawwar, Hebron critically injured an Israeli soldier. The IDF said that it was investigating whether bullets fired against the attacker hit a civilian car, slightly injuring a 45-year-old man. It also said that attacker who was wearing a shirt emblazoned with the Islamic State symbol was later shot and "neutralised" by a civilian security guard in Qalandia checkpoint.

=== 8 December ===
- The Gaza Health Ministry reported that at least 44 Palestinians were killed in Israeli attacks in the past 24 hours, increasing its count of the Palestinian death toll in Gaza to 44,708.
- A missile was launched from Yemen towards Israel.
- The IDF hit a convoy of Hezbollah vehicles containing fighters that departed from al-Qusayr, Syria.
- Four IDF reservists, one of them holding a rank of major (res.), were killed near Labbouneh, south Lebanon. The soldiers were in an underground Hezbollah complex when an explosion occurred and an underground structure collapsed, killing them. The IDF said that, according to an initial probe, it is likely that the soldiers unintentionally triggered explosives rigged by the IDF.
- Houthis said that it targeted a vital facility in southern Israel using drones in an operation done with Islamic Resistance in Iraq.
- Hours after the fall of the Assad regime, Israeli forces took complete control of the UN buffer zone in the Golan Heights, along with the towns of Khan Arnabah and Madinat al-Baath. Israel also took complete control of Mount Hermon after occupying the Syrian side of the mountain without resistance.
- An Israeli air strike on camp for displaced people in Deir el-Balah killed five members of a family including children and wounded dozens of people.
- An Israeli air strike on a residential home in Bureij refugee camp killed at least 11 people.
- Israeli shelling hit Kamal Adwan Hospital, damaging electricity and oxygen pumps. Approximately 100 tank shells and bombs hit the hospital, injuring several medical staff and patients. The IDF reported that Hamas operatives were using civilian buildings, including hospitals, which Hamas denied.
- An Israeli airstrike hit Hezbollah members at a weapons depot in Dibbin.
- The IDF said that it located and destroyed a large Hamas tunnel in Jabalia and killed Hamas operatives who emerged from the tunnel with an airstrike and fire from the ground.

=== 9 December ===
- The Gaza Health Ministry reported that at least 50 Palestinians were killed in Israeli attacks in the past 24 hours, increasing its count of the Palestinian death toll in Gaza to 44,758.
- An Israeli strike on a tent in Az-Zawayda killed Raed Ghabaien, who was released from Israeli detention in 2014 and his wife.
- A drone launched from Yemen damaged an apartment block in Yavne. Houthis reported that it hit a sensitive Israeli target.
- An Israeli strike hit people who lined up for buying flour in Rafah, killing 10 people.
- An Israeli strike on a residential building in Bureij refugee camp killed at least nine members of a family, mostly women and children.
- An Israeli air strike on a car on the Saf al-Hawa road in Bint Jbeil in the vicinity of a Lebanese army checkpoint killed one person and slightly injured four Lebanese soldiers.
- Israeli police accused an Israeli man of burning cars and spray-painting messages for Iran.
- An Israeli drone strike in Jabalia refugee camp killed three people who were attempting to searching for food.
- Three Israeli soldiers of the Givati Brigade's Shaked Battalion were killed and 12 others were injured in a Hamas attack in Jabalia, increasing the IDF death toll in Gaza to 386.
- An Israeli air strike on a building in northern Gaza sheltering a displaced family from Beit Lahia and Jabalia killed 22 people including children, women and elderly.

=== 10 December ===
- The Gaza Health Ministry reported that at least 28 Palestinians were killed in the past 24 hours, increasing its count of the Palestinian death toll in Gaza to 44,786.
- The IDF said that it killed 10 Hamas operatives who were involved in the killing of three Israeli soldiers and injuring of 12 others in Jabalia one day prior in an air strike.
- Lebanon's Broadcasting Corporation reported that an Israeli airstrike hit a multi-floored building in Beit Hanoun killed at least 10 people and wounded dozens.
- The Israeli Navy detained six Palestinian fishermen who attempted to sail into the Mediterranean Sea.
- Lebanon's Broadcasting Corporation reported that an Israeli air strike hit a home in Nuseirat refugee camp killed at least seven people including a woman and three children and injured several others. Palestinian footballer Mohamed Khalifa was also killed in the strike. Three civilians were killed in a drone strike in northern Rafah city and two others were killed in another drone attack in the Shakoush area northwest of Rafah.
- Israel's Coordinator of Government Activities in the Territories said that 201 trucks carrying humanitarian aid entered Gaza one day prior.
- Houthis said that they targeted three supply vessels and two American destroyers in the Gulf of Aden. The US military said that it intercepted weapons launched by Houthis.
- A car hit a pedestrian in Bnei Brak, slightly injuring him. Israeli police declared it as a terror ramming attack.
- A 19-year-old man was killed and his 16-year-old relative was injured during clashes between Palestinian fighters and Palestinian National Security Forces in Jenin. The Palestinian National Security Forces admitted responsibility for his death.

=== 11 December ===
- The Gaza Health Ministry reported that at least 19 Palestinians were killed in Israeli attacks in the past 24 hours, increasing its count of the Palestinian death toll in Gaza to 44,805.
- Al Jazeera reported that an Israeli strike on a residential building in the vicinity of Kamal Adwan Hospital killed at least 22 people including women and children. The IDF said that it targeted a Hamas militant.
- The Kamal Adwan Hospital said that an Israeli strike hit near its entrance and killed a woman and her two children.
- Four projectiles were launched by militants from central Gaza towards Israel. The IDF issued evacuation orders for a five-block area of the Maghazi refugee camp, saying that rockets were fired from the area.
- The IDF said that it killed Salah Dahham, the head of paragliding unit of Hamas in Jabalia, who led aerial infiltration into southern Israel during 7 October attack. It also said that it killed Fehmi Salmi, a commander of Nukhba forces of Hamas in a separate airstrike, saying that he was responsible for an attack on an IDF outpost on the border with Gaza which killed 14 Israeli soldiers during 7 October attack and led numerous attacks on soldiers operating in Gaza during the war.
- Al Jazeera reported that an Israeli strike hit a residential building in the Sheikh Radwan neighborhood of Gaza City and killed five civilians: journalist Iman Al-Shanti, her husband and three of her four children.
- Al Jazeera reported that an Israeli drone strike in the vicinity of Deir al-Balah Preparatory School killed one civilian and wounded several others.
- An Israeli shelling hit a house in Az-Zawayda killing a child.
- The IDF withdrew from Khiam in compliance with the ceasefire agreement.
- Israeli strikes in three towns in southern Lebanon killed five people.
- Reporters Without Borders (RSF) has published its annual report stating, that since October 2023 more than 145 journalists have been killed in Gaza by Israeli forces. RSF added that it has submitted war crime complaints against the Israeli army to the International Criminal Court.

=== 12 December ===
- The Gaza Health Ministry reported that at least 30 Palestinians were killed in Israeli attacks in the past 24 hours, increasing its count of the Palestinian death toll in Gaza to 44,835.
- A gun attack on a bus at a junction in Al-Khader killed an Israeli child and injured three other Israelis including a woman.
- Two Israeli strikes hit an aid convoy, killing 15 people and wounding at least 30, including several of them seriously. The IDF reported that it struck two groups of Hamas militants who planned to loot trucks carrying humanitarian aid.
- A drone was launched from Yemen and another drone was launched from the east.
- The IDF issued evacuation warnings for several neighborhoods of Gaza City after rockets were launched from the area towards Israeli soldiers operating in Gaza.
- An Israeli strike on a residential building in al-Jalaa Street killed seven people including children.
- The IDF said that an airstrike in Gaza City in this week killed Ammar Daloul, department head of weapons manufacturing division of Hamas who was also a company commander of Zeitoun Battalion of Hamas, Jihad Yassin who was a company commander of its Zeitoun Battalion, Yahya Masoud Muhammad Ashqar, who infiltrated into Israeli territory and participated in the 7 October attack, Hamas militants Kamal Saber Salim Arafat, Muhammad Muhammad Akram Aaraj, Loay Farid Faiz Hussein Ali who was a platoon commander of Hamas, Hamas militants Imad Aouni Ibrahim Rayan and Raed Samir Masoud Harazayn who was a member of internal security forces of Hamas.
- The IDF said that it conducted a drone strike on Hezbollah members in southern Lebanon. The Lebanese Health Ministry and media said that one person was killed and another person was wounded in the strike in Khiam.
- An Israeli drone strike killed Saeed Jouda, the only orthopedic surgeon in northern Gaza, while he was heading from Kamal Adwan Hospital to al-Awda Hospital.
- Israeli strikes hit a post office serving as shelter for displaced Palestinians and nearby homes in a residential area in Nuseirat refugee camp killing 36 people including women and children and injuring approximately 50 others. The IDF said that it targeted a senior PIJ leader whom it accused of attacking Israeli civilians and soldiers and accused PIJ of using civilian infrastructure and civilians as human shields.
- The IDF said that it killed two militants in the West Bank.
- Two people including a 15-year-old boy were wounded during an IDF raid in Beit Furik which triggered clashes between residents and Israeli forces.
- Israeli forces forcibly evicted a Palestinian family from the third floor of their house in Jalbun and told them to leave for four days before converting it into a military outpost.
- Israeli settlers set fire to a room and filled a water well with rubble in Jafaris area of the northern Jordan valley.
- Three people were killed in an Israeli airstrike in Dibbine.

=== 13 December ===
- The Gaza Health Ministry reported that at least 40 Palestinians were killed in Israeli attacks in the past 24 hours, increasing its count of the Palestinian death toll in Gaza to 44,875.
- An Israeli strike hit the Nassr neighbourhood of Gaza City, killing three people including civilians.
- At least three children including a 13-year-old boy were arrested by Israeli soldiers during a raid in Burqa, Ramallah.
- NNA reported that the IDF conducted two air strikes in southern Lebanon.
- Israeli strikes around Kamal Adwan Hospital wounded three medical staff, an ambulance was set ablaze and damaged the facility.
- The IDF said that it found and destroyed an underground rocket launch site in Beit Lahia. It also said that the IAF struck a militant cell that was approaching Israeli soldiers operating in Rafah and also located tunnel shafts, killed militants, and destroyed militant infrastructure sites in the same area.
- Two projectiles were launched from central Gaza towards Israel. The al-Quds Brigades claimed responsibility for a rocket strike.
- The al-Quds Brigades said that it targeted IDF soldiers and vehicles in Rafah using mortar fire.
- The IDF said that its air strike hit militants in a Gaza City school who were on their way for conducting attack plans against Israeli forces in Gaza and Israel.

=== 14 December ===
- The Gaza Health Ministry reported that at least 55 Palestinians were killed in Israeli attacks in the past 24 hours, increasing its count of the Palestinian death toll in Gaza to 44,930.
- An Israeli drone strike hit a group of people in the Jalaa Junction northwest of Gaza City, killing one woman and injuring several others. Another Israeli airstrike hit west of Nuseirat refugee camp, killing a civilian.
- Yazid Ja'ayseh, a commander of the Jenin Brigades was killed and several others were wounded during a Palestinian National Security Forces raid in Jenin refugee camp. Palestinian National Security Forces reported that it contained a booby-trapped vehicle prepared by outlaws.
- An Israeli airstrike in the vicinity of the municipality building in Deir al-Balah killed at least 10 Palestinians including the mayor of Deir al-Balah, whom the IDF accused of assisting the al-Qassam Brigades and wounded several others.
- The IDF said that the IAF struck a loaded and ready-to-use launcher in Lebanon that was aimed towards Israel.
- The IDF said that the IAF struck militants and weapon caches in the vicinity of an aid warehouse, after gunmen launched rockets from the area towards Israel.
- An Israeli airstrike on a school serving as a shelter for displaced people in Gaza City killed at least seven people including a woman and her infant and injured 12 others. The IDF said that it targeted Hamas operatives.
- A rocket was launched from central Gaza towards Israel.
- An Israeli drone strike on a vehicle in the Al-Hardali area of southern Lebanon reportedly killed a Hezbollah member.
- An Israeli air strike hit a house in Bureij refugee camp, killing Palestinian journalist Mohammed Jabr al-Qrinawi, his wife and children.
- An Israeli strike in Gaza killed Al Mashhad Media journalist Mohammed Balousha.

=== 15 December ===
- The Gaza Health Ministry reported that at least 46 Palestinians were killed in Israeli attacks in the past 24 hours, increasing its count of the Palestinian death toll in Gaza to 44,976.
- Israeli artillery strikes on Khalil Oweida School serving as shelter for displaced people in Beit Hanoun killed at least 43 Palestinians including two children and wounded several others, many of them seriously. The IDF said that it struck a militant meeting point in Beit Hanoun.
- The IDF said that it killed dozens of militants with air strikes and on the ground and captured others in Beit Hanoun.
- Several Israeli air strikes and bombings throughout Gaza killed at least 19 other Palestinians including women and children.
- An Israeli air strike hit a tent serving as shelter for displaced people in Beit Hanoun, killing several civilians and injuring several others.
- At least 17 people including six women and five children were killed in separate Israeli air strikes on three homes in Gaza City. The IDF said that it struck a militant cell in Gaza City.
- The IDF released a photo of weapons including explosives and dozens of grenades, saying that they were seized from Beit Lahia.
- The IDF said that the IAF attacked a Hamas command and control center in a compound in the Abu Shabak clinic in Jabalia used for storing weapons and plan attacks. The Gaza Health Ministry said that the air strike destroyed the facility, which included a mental health clinic.
- The IDF said that the Kfir Brigade killed several militants in Beit Lahia during ground battles and airstrikes.
- The IDF announced that it destroyed more than 300 Hezbollah sites in the last three months.
- An Israeli airstrike hit a Gaza civil defense agency position in the Nuseirat refugee camp, killing Palestinian video journalist Ahmed Al-Louh who worked for Al Jazeera and other media outlets and five other including the head of the civil emergency service in Nuseirat, Nedal Abu Hjayyer. The IDF said that it targeted Hamas and PIJ militants operating from a militant command center inside Nuseirat office of Gaza Civil Defence. It reported that Ahmed Al-Louh was a PIJ member. Al Jazeera denied the accusation.
- An Israeli airstrike hit a group of Hamas-linked men responsible for protecting aid trucks west of Gaza City, killing or injuring several people.
- The IDF announced that its 91st Division seized more than 10,000 Hezbollah weapons.
- An Israeli strike on a home in Nuseirat refugee camp killed five people including children.
- An Israeli strike on the UNRWA-run Ahmed bin Abdul Aziz school sheltering displaced people in Khan Yunis killed at least 20 people, including women and children and injured many others. The IDF said that it carried out a "precise" strike on Hamas militants operating inside a command and control center and a training camp for preparing and planning attacks against Israeli forces embedded within a compound that served as a former school in Khan Yunis.

=== 16 December ===
- The Gaza Health Ministry reported that at least 52 Palestinians were killed in Israeli attacks in the past 24 hours, increasing its count of the Palestinian death toll in Gaza to 45,028. The IDF said that it killed over 17,000 militants.
- An Israeli strike on a house in the vicinity of the Qassam Cemetery in the central Nuseirat refugee camp killed at least five people, including a child and injured at least 13 others.
- Israeli forces closed a road in the Old City of Hebron, blocking access to the Ibrahimi Mosque and two neighborhoods. It also uprooted trees and bulldozed Palestinian land for constructing an Israeli settlement south of Hebron. Israeli settlers seized approximately 60 dunums (14.8 acres) of land owned by Palestinian residents south of Hebron and Israeli soldiers forced farmers to leave agricultural land estimated at 250 dunums (61 acres), saying that they would need permits issued by Israel to return.
- A 16-year-old Palestinian boy was injured on his head by bullet shrapnel during an IDF raid in Balata refugee camp.
- A drone and a ballistic missile was launched from Yemen towards Israel. Houthis reported that its operation achieved its aims.
- An Israeli strike destroyed a residential building in Nuseirat refugee camp, killing five people including civilians. Another Israeli strike on a home in Shuja'iyya killed 10 people including two children.
- The IDF warned residents of 73 villages in southern Lebanon against returning until further notice.
- Israeli forces demolished Palestinian houses and structures in Silwan and Fheidat. Wafa reported that Israeli forces assaulted several people before arresting a man in al-Eizariya.
- An Israeli strike hit a group of people including civilians near a cemetery in Nuseirat refugee camp. Another Israeli strike destroyed a residential house in Beit Lahia, killing at least five people including civilians.
- An American official said that Houthis fired four drones and a missile towards three commercial vessels that was escorted by US Navy ships in the Gulf of Aden. The official also said that US Navy destroyers, a Navy helicopter, and a French Air Force aircraft shot down weapons launched by Houthis.
- An Israeli drone strike in al-Najariyah, Sidon District injured at least three people.
- The IDF said that it struck launchers positioned in Lebanon for firing towards Israel.
- Israeli forces arrested a Palestinian child in Beit Furik.
- Israeli strikes hit a power generator of Kamal Adwan Hospital, causing a power outage.
- The US military said that it carried out a precision airstrike on a key Houthi command and control facility in Sanaa.
- Israeli forces shot and killed a disabled Palestinian man during its raid in Hebron.

=== 17 December ===
- The Gaza Health Ministry reported that at least 31 Palestinians were killed in Israeli attacks in the past 24 hours, increasing its count of the Palestinian death toll in Gaza to 45,059.
- At least 10 bombs dropped by Israeli quadcopter drones hit Kamal Adwan Hospital, cutting off power.
- An Israeli airstrike on a residential building in Daraj neighbourhood, east of Gaza City killed at least 10 people including three children and an elderly woman. The IDF said that it targeted a Hamas militant in a militant infrastructure site.
- Israeli settlers attacked several vehicles belonging to Palestinians at the entrance of al-Mazraa al-Gharbiya village, northwest of Ramallah.
- The IDF announced that two Israeli soldiers were killed and two others were injured in a building collapse in Rafah one day prior. An initial IDF investigation said the incident occurred in a building that had already sustained heavy damage.
- Israeli forces planted booby traps around Kamal Adwan Hospital.
- The Shin Bet and Israeli police accused an Israeli man of spying for Iran and planning terror attacks.
- The IDF said that it destroyed a Hamas tunnel in Jabalia used to kill three Israeli soldiers.
- The IDF said that it seized a large Hezbollah weapons cache in southern Lebanon.
- Israeli forces arrested 12 Palestinians including two children from the West Bank.
- An Israeli airstrike on a home in Beit Lahia killed at least 15 Palestinians and trapped several others under the rubble. The IDF said that it struck a facility used by Hamas for storing weapons that served as a sniper post.
- The al-Qassam Brigades reported that it destroyed an IDF troop carrier in Jabalia refugee camp. It also reported that it killed three Israeli soldiers by attacking them at point-blank range.
- An Israeli airstrike hit Khalifa bin Zayed school serving as shelter for displaced Palestinians in northern Gaza, killing one person and injuring three others including children.
- An Israeli drone strike on a car in Majdal Zoun, injured three people. The IDF said that it targeted a Hezbollah operative who was loading up a vehicle with weapons.
- Wafa reported that Israeli forces arrested three brothers after assaulting them and damaging their home in the Old City of Hebron.
- An Israeli strike hit a tent serving as shelter for displaced people in Israeli-designated safe zone of al-Mawasi, killing a Palestinian woman and injuring five children.

=== 18 December ===
- The Gaza Health Ministry reported that at least 38 Palestinians were killed in Israeli attacks in the past 24 hours, increasing its count of the Palestinian death toll in Gaza to 45,097.
- A 24-year-old man was injured by Israeli gunfire during clashes in Abwein. Israeli forces also raided Nablus and Rojib, triggering clashes with Palestinian fighters.
- Israeli strikes destroyed two homes in Kfar Kila.
- Israeli shelling near Al-Awda Hospital injured seven medics and one patient.
- A bus carrying Israeli settlers to Joseph's Tomb came under fire in the vicinity of Nablus, injuring its driver.
- Israeli forces arrested 15 Palestinians including a woman from the West Bank.
- Israeli shelling hit a home in Khuza'a, Khan Yunis killed three people including two women and wounded a child.
- The IDF said that it struck a number of Hamas militants planning an imminent attack against Israeli soldiers in Jabalia.
- The IDF acknowledged that a group of Israeli settlers crossed the northern border and entered Lebanon this month before being dispersed by its soldiers.
- The IDF issued evacuation orders for residents of four residential blocks in Bureij refugee camp to move to a humanitarian zone in the Mawasi area, saying that Palestinian militants launched rockets from the area towards Israel.
- At least three Palestinians including a senior Jenin Brigades commander and a child were killed during Palestinian National Security Forces's clashes with Palestinian fighters in Jenin refugee camp.
- Wafa reported that an Israeli air strike in the vicinity of Khan Yunis killed three civilians. It also reported that Israeli air strike in Al-Qarara killed one civilian.
- Israeli forces demolished several houses in Tayr Harfa, al-Jabeen and Shiheen. NNA reported that Israeli bulldozers demolished neighborhoods in Naqoura for the third consecutive day.
- Israeli air strikes on a building near Kamal Adwan Hospital killed eight people and trapped children under the rubble.
- Israeli forces assaulted some Palestinians during a raid in Marda, Salfit.
- Israeli strikes on two houses in northern Gaza killed 14 people, most of them women and children. One of those strikes on a home in the vicinity of al-Tabin School in the Daraj Quarter killed a Palestinian doctor.

=== 19 December ===
- The Gaza Health Ministry reported that at least 32 Palestinians were killed in Israeli attacks in the past 24 hours, increasing its count of the Palestinian death toll in Gaza to 45,129.
- The Arrow defense system "partially" intercepted a missile launched from Yemen outside of Israeli airspace, but the missile's warhead nevertheless hit a school in Ramat Gan in the middle of the night and detonated, causing the building to collapse. There were no injuries. Shortly after, 14 Israeli warplanes dropped dozens of munitions on five locations in Yemen in two waves of airstrikes. The first wave saw four strikes hit Hudaydah Port, two hit the Ras Isa oil terminal, and other strikes hit the Port of Salif. The second wave targeted two power stations north and south of Sanaa. The IDF said that the strikes hit targets "used by Houthi forces for their military operations." Houthi affiliated Al Masirah reported that Israeli attacks killed at least nine civilians and wounded three others.
- Israeli soldiers told Haaretz that the IDF ordered to kill anyone who enters the Netzarim Corridor. The IDF denied the accusations.
- Human Rights Watch accused the Netanyahu government of committing acts of genocide by denying clean water for Palestinians in Gaza. The government rejected the accusation.
- A Médecins Sans Frontières report said that it found clear signs of ethnic cleansing in Gaza. Netanyahu government rejected the report.
- Bullets fired by Israeli forces killed four people including an elderly woman and wounded two others including an elderly man during a raid on Balata refugee camp. Clashes were also reported between Palestinian fighters in the area.
- Israeli forces arrested at least 14 Palestinians, including two children from the West Bank. The Commission of Detainees and Ex-Detainees Affairs and the Prisoner's Club reported that Israeli soldiers threatened the detainees and their families and vandalised their houses.
- A drone was launched from Gaza towards Israel.
- Israeli strikes in Gaza killed at least 25 people including children. Israeli strikes on a group of people in the Zeitoun neighbourhood, Gaza City killed one Palestinian civilian and wounded several others.
- The IDF said that it conducted an air strike in collaboration with Shin Bet in Tulkarm. The Palestinian Authority Health Ministry said that four people were killed and three others were critically wounded in an Israeli drone strike in the area. The Tulkarm Brigade confirmed that those killed were its fighters.
- The Shin Bet and the Israel Police arrested and charged a 19-year-old Nazareth resident of spying for Hezbollah during the war.
- Israeli police arrested four Israeli civilians for illegally entering into Lebanon.
- The IDF said that it shot down a drone outside Israel, above the Mediterranean Sea.
- The IDF said that it demolished Hezbollah rocket launchers in southern Lebanon aimed towards Israel.
- Israeli air strikes on Dar al-Arqam and Shaaban al-Rayes schools sheltering displaced Palestinians in the Tuffah neighbourhood of Gaza City killed at least 17 Palestinians including five children and injured 30 others. The IDF said that it targeted groups of Hamas militants in command and control centers embedded inside the schools. It also said that complexes were used by Hamas for planning and executing attacks against its forces.
- The Houthis said that it launched a drone towards an IDF target in central Israel.

=== 20 December ===
- The Gaza Health Ministry reported that at least 77 Palestinians were killed in Israeli attacks in the past 24 hours, increasing its count of the Palestinian death toll in Gaza to 45,206.
- Israeli settlers set fire to a mosque in Marda, Salfit and wrote racist slogans on its wall.
- Israeli forces arrested three members of a family including a woman from Rujeib.
- Al Jazeera reported that Israeli drone strikes hit civilians in Jabalia al-Balad. Israeli strikes destroyed residential buildings in Sabra, Gaza, killing at least four people including civilians.
- Israeli forces arrested a doctor from Birzeit.
- An Israeli drone strike hit Kamal Adwan Hospital. Israeli artillery also targeted its gate.
- An Israeli strike in Beit Hanoun killed four people including a woman and her two daughters.
- A 15-year-old Palestinian teenager was injured on his knee during an IDF raid in Beit Furik. Clashes were also reported in the area.
- An Israeli strike on a residential building in Nuseirat refugee camp killed eight people including four children and wounded 16 others.
- A disabled Palestinian man was wounded on his knee by Israeli soldiers in Wadi Qana area of Deir Istiya.
- An Israeli strike on a home in Jabalia killed at least 12 Palestinians, including seven children and two women and wounded 15 others. The IDF said that it struck several militants operating in a Hamas military structure and posed a threat to its soldiers in the area.
- An Israeli airstrike killed at least 10 people at the Al-Shati refugee camp.
- The al-Qassam Brigades reported that one of its fighters killed two Israeli soldiers before blowing himself up in the Jabalia refugee camp.
- NNA reported that Israeli forces blew up several homes and properties in Yaroun.
- The IDF said that it dismantled approximately five miles of Hamas tunnels in Beit Lahia. It also said that it found IDF equipment stolen by Hamas militants during the 7 October attack, weapons, and maps of Israeli border communities.
- Amnesty International accused Hezbollah of violating international law.
- Israel's Coordinator of Government Activities in the Territories said that it facilitated the evacuation of more than 100 patients, caregivers and others from Kamal Adwan and Al-Awda Hospitals, as well as the delivery of 5,000 liters of fuel and food packages to the hospitals.
- Israel's Coordinator of Government Activities in the Territories said that it helped the World Food Programme deliver eight empty trucks to bolster aid delivery across Gaza.

=== 21 December ===
- The Gaza Health Ministry reported that at least 21 Palestinians were killed in Israeli attacks in the past 24 hours, increasing its count of the Palestinian death toll in Gaza to 45,227.
- A Houthi surface-to-surface ballistic missile struck a playground in southern Tel Aviv after interception attempts by the IDF failed, broken glass lightly injuring 16 people including a 3-year-old girl. 14 others were injured from falls while seeking shelter, and seven were treated for shock. The Houthis reported that they fired a hypersonic ballistic missile named 'Palestine-2' directed at an IDF target in the Tel Aviv area.
- Palestinian fighters detonated antipersonnel and antivehicle bombs against the IDF during clashes in Silat al-Harithiya.
- Israeli forces assaulted a Palestinian man and destroyed a Palestinian-owned vehicle in Burqa, West Bank.
- Israeli soldiers arrested two children from Husan.
- Israeli forces blew up several residential buildings in the Al-Janina neighbourhood of Rafah.
- Israeli forces shot bullets and tear gas bombs after attacking the southeastern side of Qusra, injuring several people. Israeli settlers attacked farmers and a home in Burqa, West Bank to evict them.
- The Palestinian Authority Health Ministry reported that a seven-year-old Palestinian child was killed due to the explosion of a landmine left by the IDF in the Rashaida area southeast of Bethlehem.
- Israeli forces opened fire on 20 Palestinians attempting to cross the West Bank barrier, killing one of them.
- A drone was launched "from the east" towards Israel.
- Israeli forces blew up buildings in the west of Beit Lahia.
- The al-Qassam Brigades reported that it fatally stabbed three Israeli soldiers in the Jabalia refugee camp. It also reported that it attacked a home in the area where an Israeli infantry force was hiding and killed two more soldiers.
- An Israeli air strike on a home in Nuseirat refugee camp killed at least five people, including two children.
- Israeli authorities forced two Palestinians to demolish their houses in the Jabel Mukaber and Silwan neighborhoods of East Jerusalem.
- Israeli forces beat a young Palestinian man during an IDF raid in Beita, Nablus.
- A solidarity group of Israeli activists supporting at-risk Palestinian villages in the southern West Bank released footage of an Israeli settler attack on Palestinians in Susya.
- US said that it carried out strikes on a Houthi missile storage center and a command-and-control facility in Sanaa. It also said that its forces shot down multiple Houthi drones and an anti-ship cruise missile above the Red Sea. It later confirmed that USS Gettysburg accidentally shot down a F/A-18 Super Hornet fighter jet over the Red Sea in a friendly fire incident, with one of its pilots suffering minor injuries. The Houthis reported that they thwarted the attack and shot down the F-18 jet.
- The IDF issued evacuation orders for medical staff of Kamal Adwan Hospital. Israeli strikes later hit critical areas of the hospital including the ICU and incubators, saying that it housed militants.
- An Israeli strike on a house in Deir al-Balah killed eight people, including three women and two children and wounded others including children. The IDF said that it targeted a PIJ militant.
- An Israeli air strike in northern Gaza killed a woman and her three daughters.

=== 22 December ===
- The Gaza Health Ministry reported that at least 32 Palestinians were killed in Israeli attacks in the past 24 hours, increasing its count of the Palestinian death toll in Gaza to 45,259.
- An Israeli strike on Musa bin Nusair school sheltering displaced people in Daraj neighbourhood of Gaza City killed at least eight people, including three children and wounded dozens. The IDF said that it conducted air strikes targeting Hamas militants in a command and control complex in the premises of the school. It also reported that they used the school to plan and carry out attacks targeting soldiers in Gaza and targeting Israel.
- Israeli strikes hit Kamal Adwan hospital, killing three civilians and causing a complete power loss. The IDF was also accused of bombing its ICU. Israeli strikes also hit al-Awda Hospital. The hospital director Husam Abu Safia said that the IDF ordered a complete evacuation of the facility.
- Lebanese agriculture minister Abbas Al Hajj Hassan accused the IDF of bulldozing citrus orchards in Naqoura.
- Israeli forces blew up residential buildings in Nuseirat refugee camp.
- An Israeli strike on a house in Jabalia killed a woman and her four children.
- An Israeli strike in Khan Yunis killed two people including a woman.
- Israeli forces detained six people including a child from the West Bank.
- The al-Qassam Brigades reported that it destroyed an Israeli tank in the al-Alami area in the Jabalia refugee camp.
- An Israeli strike on a vehicle in al-Jalaa Street of Gaza City killed four men including a member of the Gaza legislative council who was the director of government operations in the council.
- Israeli authorities arrested two Jerusalem residents accused of providing information to Hezbollah.
- A Palestinian Presidential Guard officer was killed and two other officers were wounded during clashes with fighters in Jenin. Three fighters were also killed in the clashes.
- The al-Qassam Brigades reported that it hit a group of nine Israeli soldiers who were hiding in a home in the west of the Jabalia refugee camp using a thermobaric rocket, killing and injuring several soldiers. It also reported that it killed an Israeli soldier in the Jabalia refugee camp.
- An Israeli drone strike on a group of people in the Bureij refugee camp killed one child.
- The IDF said that it killed over 2,000 Palestinians and arrested almost 1,500 others in Jabalia refugee camp during the siege of North Gaza. It reported that most of those killed were armed.
- The IDF said that it wrapped up its operation in Beit Lahia after the Kfir Brigade killed numerous gunmen and destroyed militant infrastructure underground and on the ground. It also said that it entered Beit Hanoun after the IAF and the 215th Artillery Regiment bombed Hamas targets, including militants and infrastructure.
- An Israeli strike destroyed a residential building in Nuseirat refugee camp, killing at least five Palestinians, including civilians.
- The IDF said that a reservist from 429th Battalion of the Harel Brigade was critically injured in central Gaza when his tank drove over an explosive device planted by militants.
- NNA reported that Israeli strikes hit Kfar Kila.
- Israeli strikes hit tents serving as shelter for displaced people in Israeli designated humanitarian safe zone of al-Mawasi, killing eight people including two children and injuring many others. The IDF said that it carried out an "intelligence based strike" targeting a Hamas militant.
- Hamas released a video, saying that it was filmed in northern Gaza, showing fighters positioned in buildings that was blown-out and in piles of wreckage, wearing civilian clothes and launching projectiles towards Israeli forces. The PIJ also reported that it inflicted casualties on Israeli soldiers.
- Israeli activist group Peace Now said that Israeli settlers established outposts in Area B of West Bank for first time since the Oslo Accords.
- Oxfam said that only 12 aid trucks were delivered to north Gaza since October.

=== 23 December ===
- The Gaza Health Ministry reported that at least 58 Palestinians were killed in Israeli attacks in the past 24 hours, increasing its count of the Palestinian death toll in Gaza to 45,317.
- Israel announced that three soldiers of the Kfir Brigade were killed fighting Hamas in the northern Gaza Strip, increasing the IDF death toll in Gaza to 391.
- The IDF was accused of abusing dozens of detainees in Fawwar, Hebron.
- An Israeli strike hit a civilian vehicle in al-Mawasi, killing two people.
- Two people were injured in clashes with Israeli forces during the demolition of buildings in Shuyukh al-Arrub.
- Clashes were reported during an IDF raid in Sa'ir.
- An Israeli strike hit people securing an aid convoy in central Gaza, killing four people and injuring three others. The IDF was accused of protecting aid looters. The IDF rejected the accusations and accused Hamas of looting aid.
- The al-Qassam Brigades reported that it killed three Israeli soldiers guarding a building in Beit Lahia and released people held inside.
- An Israeli air strike hit a group of people in Bani Suheila roundabout on Salah al-Din Road, east of Khan Yunis killing one person and injuring dozens including civilians.
- The Gaza Government Media Office said that Israeli strikes killed and wounded over 50 people including children and women in Nuseirat refugee camp.
- Israeli forces shot a man in Himza checkpoint in Jerusalem. Israeli police said that a soldier fired towards a suspect who got out of a vehicle and accused him of brandishing a knife.
- A second member of the Palestinian National Security Forces was killed during confrontations with Palestinian fighters in Jenin.
- The IDF indefinitely prohibited residents of 62 villages in southern Lebanon from returning.
- The al-Qassam Brigades said that it struck an Israeli Merkava tank and armoured personnel carrier using Yassin-105 rockets and downed a quadcopter in the Nuseirat refugee camp.
- The Houthis said that it launched two drone from Yemen towards Israel, one of them targeting an IDF target around Ashkelon and reported that it "successfully achieved its goal". Israeli prime minister Benjamin Netanyahu said that he ordered the IDF to destroy Houthi infrastructure.
- The IDF announced that it killed Tharwat Muhammad Ahmed Albec, head of the National Security Directorate of Hamas in collaboration with Shin Bet.
- A 13-year-old child was killed during a Palestinian Authority raid in Jenin refugee camp.
- NNA reported that an Israeli strike on a group of people in Taybeh and injured one person.
- A Palestinian woman was shot and injured on her foot during an IDF raid in Husan.
- Israeli shelling hit Kamal Adwan Hospital, injuring at least 20 people.
- Israel admitted responsibility for the assassination of Hamas leader Ismail Haniyeh.

=== 24 December ===
- The Gaza Health Ministry reported that at least 21 Palestinians were killed in Israeli attacks in the past 24 hours, increasing its count of the Palestinian death toll in Gaza to 45,338.
- Clashes were reported between Israeli forces and Palestinian fighters in al-Ein refugee camp.
- An Israeli strike on a house in the vicinity of El Samra Historical Bathhouse in Gaza City killed four people including two women and a child.
- At least eight people were killed during IDF operations around Tulkarm. The IDF said that it opened fire at militants who attacked soldiers, but was aware of uninvolved civilians who were harmed during the raid. Israeli soldiers also detonated an explosive device planted by Palestinian militants during a raid in Nur Shams. A Palestinian man was killed by an IDF sniper in the al-Hadaida neighbourhood during clashes between Palestinian fighters and Israeli forces in Tulkarm Camp. Wafa also reported that Israeli bulldozers destroyed infrastructure throughout the camp, including schools, shops, houses, a mosque and the water network, while Israeli strikes caused a power outage and disrupted internet access. The IDF said that it launched a large operation in Tulkarm Governorate and said that the deceased died during face-to-face fighting and that it seized weapons, including rifles and pistols, and arrested two wanted individuals. Later, an Israeli bombing in the area killed one Palestinian and seriously wounded another. A 15-year-old boy was shot and wounded during an IDF raid in Beit Furik. An Israeli strike in Tulkarm Camp killed at least three people including a woman and injured six others. The IDF said that its drone strike targeted a group of Palestinian militants. Another woman was also killed during an IDF raid.
- Israeli artillery strikes hit the third floor of Al Awda Hospital. Israeli forces also forced patients to leave the Indonesia Hospital.
- Wafa reported that a 49-year-old woman was beaten by Israeli forces in the West Bank.
- Israeli forces demolished olive trees and two homes under construction in Hizma, saying that they did not have a license.
- Clashes erupted between Palestinian National Security Forces and Palestinian fighters in Tubas Governorate after the former seized equipment from a home in Tammun.
- Four separate Israeli strikes throughout Gaza killed at least nine people including a civil emergency service member.
- A ballistic missile was launched from Yemen towards Israel. Israeli defence minister Israel Katz said that the IDF will start targeting Houthi leaders in Yemen.
- Fatah banned Al Jazeera from reporting in Jenin Governorate because of its coverage of the Jenin clashes and accused the network of inciting domestic conflicts. Al Jazeera rejected the claim.
- The Al-Aqsa Martyrs' Brigades said that it clashed with Israeli forces in Tulkarm.
- The al-Quds Brigades reported to have ambushed a group of 12 Israeli soldiers by blowing up a home in the west of Beit Hanoun. It also reported to have detonated an explosive device on a Merkava tank.
- The IDF reported to have seized more than 84,000 Hezbollah weapons.
- The IDF reported to have killed at least five Hamas militants and arrested several including a militant who participated in the 7 October attacks at the Indonesia Hospital. Hamas denied using civilian facilities including hospitals.
- An Israeli strike hit a group of people in Sheikh Radwan neighbourhood of Gaza City killing at least one person and injured others including civilians.
- An Israeli strike on a home in Jabalia killed eight people including three children.
- The IDF reported that its jets struck a Hamas rocket launcher positioned next to a UN building in Al-Shati refugee camp after issuing an evacuation order for civilians in the area. It added that it spotted a rocket launched from the area.
- An IDF report found that IDF actions inadvertently contributed to a decision of Hamas militants to allegedly kill six hostages.
- An Israeli strike killed another Gaza Civil Defense member in Gaza City.
- Palestinian media reported that Israeli settlers threw stones towards Palestinians and set fire to a barn housing sheep in Arab Al-Melihat, northwest of Jericho.
- The IDF said that the commander of a regional brigade in the West Bank charged with Jenin and Tulkarm was slightly injured in a bomb blast in the vicinity of his vehicle during an IDF operation in Tulkarm.
- An Israeli strike on a tent housing displaced people in humanitarian zone of Khan Yunis killed at least two people and injured seven others including children. The IDF reported that it targeted a Hamas militant.

=== 25 December ===
- The Gaza Health Ministry reported that at least 23 Palestinians were killed in Israeli attacks in the past 24 hours, increasing its count of the Palestinian death toll in Gaza to 45,361.
- An Israeli drone strike in Tammun injured several Palestinians. The IDF confirmed that it conducted the strike after Palestinian militants set off explosives targeting its soldiers in the area. The al-Quds Brigades's Tubas Battalion claimed responsibility.
- A missile launched from the Yemen towards Israel. The Houthis said that it hit an IDF target in Jaffa using a hypersonic ballistic missile. The IAF chief Tomer Bar said that strikes against Houthis will increase in pace and intensity.
- Two men were injured after an IDF raid in Nablus.
- An Israeli strike on a residential building in the vicinity of the Ain Jalut Towers in Nuseirat refugee camp killed two people including a woman. Another Israeli strike on a home in the Maen area of Khan Yunis killed at least 10 people and injured several others.
- An Israeli strike destroyed four-storey residential building sheltering displaced people in Jabalia, killing at least nine Palestinians including five children.
- Palestinian National Security Forces announced that a captain in the General Intelligence Service in Jenin died while attempting to dismantle an explosive device during a PA operation.
- Israeli forces arrested Palestine TV driver Shadi Kifaya from Al-Am'ari. Israeli forces also used a detainee as a human shield.
- An Israeli strike hit a home in Gaza City, killing a pregnant woman. Another Israeli strike on a house south of the Nuseirat refugee camp killed two people including Palestinian writer Walaa Jumaa Al-Ifranji.
- An Israeli strike targeted warehouses believed to be owned by Hezbollah in Tarya, Baalbek District.
- The IDF said that it destroyed two Hamas tunnels with multiple exit shafts in Gaza used for launching attacks.
- An Israeli strike on a school sheltering displaced people in the Sheikh Radwan neighbourhood of Gaza City killed at least three Palestinians including a child. The IDF said that it conducted a drone strike targeting a Hamas militant in the same neighborhood.
- The Houthis reported to have uncovered a Mossad and CIA spy ring.
- Israeli forces demolished a park in Khallet al-Daliya area to the south of Nahalin, saying that it was constructed without a permit.
- A drone launched from Yemen towards Israel crashed in an open area in the vicinity of Ashkelon. The Houthis claimed responsibility.
- Four people including a 69-year-old man and a girl were injured during IDF raid in Tulkarem camp.
- Israeli strikes hit water and fuel tanks of Kamal Adwan Hospital, destroying them and blowing out hospital doors and windows.
- An Israeli strike on a group of people in al-Nazla neighbourhood killed a woman.
- The IDF said that its airstrike struck a group of Hamas militants who were planning to conduct a drone attack against its soldiers in Gaza City.
- A three-week old Palestinian girl froze to death in a displacement camp near Khan Yunis. She was the third infant to freeze to death in recent days.

=== 26 December ===
- The Gaza Health Ministry reported that at least 38 Palestinians were killed in Israeli attacks in the past 24 hours, increasing its count of the Palestinian death toll in Gaza to 45,399.
- Five journalists were killed in an Israeli airstrike on a vehicle labeled "press" in front of the al-Awda hospital in Nuseirat camp with the Quds News Network reporting that the journalists were from Al Quds Today. The IDF said that those killed were members of PIJ.
- Israeli forces detonated an explosives-laden robot in the vicinity of Kamal Adwan Hospital, injuring a nurse.
- An Israeli drone strike killed a woman in front of the gate of Kamal Adwan Hospital.
- The IDF said that it concluded a two-day operation in Tulkarm after killing seven Palestinian militants including several significant members of a local militant ring. It also said that soldiers also destroyed explosive devices, confiscated weapons, and detained several suspects.
- A reservist IDF officer who was a team commander in the 6551st Battalion in the 551st Reserve Paratroopers Brigade was killed during clashes with militants in central Gaza.
- An IDF vehicle allegedly tried to run over a female journalist covering a raid in Nur Shams.
- The IDF said that it destroyed a two-kilometer long Hamas tunnel in Jabalia.
- A group of Israeli families with relatives held hostage in Gaza wrote to Israeli prime minister Benjamin Netanyahu saying that they will appeal to the Supreme Court if the government did not sign an agreement to release the hostages.
- An Israeli strike near Kamal Adwan Hospital killed two ambulance crew members.
- The al-Qassam Brigades reported to have struck an Israeli Merkava tank using an explosive device in the vicinity of a mosque south of the Zeitoun neighbourhood of Gaza City. It also reported that Palestinian fighters inflicted casualties on an IDF infantry force.
- 25 IAF jets carried out airstrikes in Yemen against Houthi targets, hitting the Sanaa International Airport, where an air traffic control tower, the departure lounge and runway were damaged; the Hezyaz power station near Sanaa; as well as infrastructure in Al Hudaydah, As-Salif, and Ras Qantib ports, including a power plant. At least six people were killed and at least 40 others were wounded in the attacks according to the Houthis, with Director-General of the World Health Organization Tedros Adhanom Ghebreyesus, who was visiting Yemen to negotiate the release of UN staff members as well as employees of diplomatic missions and NGO workers arrested by the Houthis, narrowly escaping being killed, and an employee of the United Nations Humanitarian Air Service being seriously wounded.
- A Palestinian fisherman died after being shot by Israeli forces while working in the Tabat al-Nuwairi area, west of the Nuseirat refugee camp.
- An Israeli strike hit a home in eastern Gaza City killing at least four people, injuring at least three others and trapping several others including children under the rubble.
- Wafa reported that a fourth infant died because of extreme cold in the last 72 hours.
- The New York Times reported that the IDF loosened its rules of engagement due to the 7 October attacks and fear of another attack. The report stated that IDF authorities have the ability to order attacks on Hamas personnel that risk killing a maximum of 20 civilians as collateral damage. This is reported to be the first such order issued in Israeli military history. Per an older Israeli report from April 2024, these rules were decided in the first weeks of the war, and the targets to be bombed were not places from which militants were firing at Israel or Israeli forces, but homes of known or suspected Hamas members.
- An Israeli air strike hit a building in the vicinity of Kamal Adwan Hospital, killing about 50 people, including five staff.
- An 18-year-old Palestinian male was shot dead by Israeli forces during a raid in Yabad, southwest of Jenin.
- An IDF major who was a platoon commander in the elite Multidomain Unit was killed and another soldier from the same unit was critically injured during combat in north Gaza. A tank commander from the 9th Battalion of the 401st Armored Brigade was also critically injured by sniper fire in north Gaza.
- According to Institute for the Study of War, Jenin Brigades said that it confronted "occupation forces" in Jenin, likely referring to the Palestinian Authority.

=== 27 December ===
- The Gaza Health Ministry reported that at least 37 Palestinians were killed in Israeli attacks in the past 24 hours, increasing its count of the Palestinian death toll in Gaza to 45,436.
- Israeli settlers chanted slogans against Arabs and Palestinians during prayer after arriving at an archaeological site in Halhul, protected by Israeli soldiers. Clashes also erupted with some Palestinian youths.
- After the second Israeli wave of airstrikes on Yemen, the Houthis launched another ballistic missile at Tel Aviv, causing sirens to sound across central Israel. It was intercepted outside of Israeli airspace by the US Terminal High Altitude Area Defense system, marking its first use since its deployment to Israel in October. Four El Al flights were rerouted, while 18 people were injured while seeking shelter and two others were treated for anxiety attacks. The Houthis said that it successfully targeted Ben Gurion Airport and caused casualties and the cessation of navigation at the facility. It also reported to have conducted a drone strike on a "vital target" in Tel Aviv area and targeted a container ship in the Arabian Sea using several drones.
- A Palestinian National Security Forces officer was shot dead by a Palestinian gunmen in Jenin refugee camp during clashes.
- Israeli forces raided Kamal Adwan Hospital after forcing most of the staff and patients and their family to leave the facility. The IDF said that it launched a new operation at the facility that it identified presence of Hamas militants in the hospital. Israeli forces later ignited fire in the facility. The IDF reported that it never entered the hospital, that the fire in the hospital was "small", and that there was "no connection" between the fire and its activities.
- A health worker of the Gaza European Hospital died from extreme cold at his tent in al-Mawasi.
- The al-Qassam Brigades reported that one of its fighters killed and injured five Israeli soldiers by blowing himself up with an explosive belt. It also reported that it attacked two other soldiers who tried to rescue them in the Tel al-Zaatar area in the east of Jabalia refugee camp.
- The IDF said that it struck Hezbollah infrastructure used for smuggling weapons from Syria to Lebanon in the vicinity of Janta village in the Syrian-Lebanese border.
- An elderly woman died from injuries sustained in a stabbing attack in Herzliya. The attacker was shot and wounded by a security guard before being arrested by police officers.
- A rocket launched from the north Gaza hit an open area in the vicinity of Sderot.
- An Israeli strike on a home in Sheikh Radwan area of north Gaza killed at least 15 people including children and women and trapped several others under the rubble.
- Houthis said that an US-UK airstrike hit Sana'a.
- An Israeli drone strike hit al-Jundi al-Majhool area of the Remal neighbourhood, west of Gaza City, killing one woman. Another Israeli drone strike hit the vicinity of Jordanian Field Hospital in the Sabra neighbourhood, south of Gaza City, killing one civilian.
- The IDF issued evacuation orders for residents near Kamal Adwan Hospital.

=== 28 December ===
- The Gaza Health Ministry reported that at least 48 Palestinians were killed in Israeli attacks in the past 24 hours, increasing its count of the Palestinian death toll in Gaza to 45,484.
- A ballistic missile launched from Yemen towards Israel. Houthis said that it targeted Nevatim Airbase and reported that it successfully hit its target.
- An Israeli strike on a multistorey building in the Maghazi refugee camp killed nine people including children and women. Another Israeli strike hit Jabalia al-Balad, killing two other civilians.
- Israeli shelling and gunfire in the Israeli-designated safe zone of al-Mawasi injured people.
- A member of the Palestinian Presidential Guard was killed after being shot by Palestinian militants during a Palestinian Authority operation in Jenin refugee camp.
- The IDF said that its fighter jets and artillery conducted several strikes in Beit Hanoun, targeting Hamas militants and sites used by it.
- The Gaza Government Media Office said that 110,000 of 135,000 tents of displaced Palestinians in the Gaza "completely deteriorated" and went out of service.
- The Times of Israel reported that the IDF vastly expanded the military corridor bisecting Gaza.
- The IDF arrested 15 people including a woman from the West Bank.
- Three Palestinian farmers were injured in a settler attack while working in private lands in Silwad. Settlers also damaged several vehicles.
- The al-Qassam Brigades reported that it attacked an Israeli soldier in the vicinity of Sultan Studio east of Jabalia.
- Al Masirah reported that two American-British air attacks targeted the Midi area of Hajjah Governorate.
- An Israeli strike on a home in Beit Hanoun killed 10 Palestinians. Another Israeli strike on a tent in the Israeli-designated safe area of al-Mawasi killed at least two Palestinians.
- Two long-range rockets were launched from north Gaza towards West Jerusalem. Later, the IDF issued evacuation orders for Beit Hanoun, saying that rockets were launched from the area. Later, the IDF announced that IAF struck the launchers used for launching rockets.
- Israeli special forces seized a man from Quds Street in the eastern area of Nablus.
- The IDF accused Hamas militants of using the Kamal Adwan Hospital and detained more than 240 people, most of them suspected Hamas militants. It confirmed that it detained the hospital director for interrogation and called him a suspected Hamas militant. It said that it surrounded the hospital and reported that its special forces entered and seized weapons from the area. The IDF reported to have killed 19 militants during its raid. Hamas denied the claim. Gaza Health Ministry said that 50 people including hospital staff were killed. Euro-Med Human Rights Monitor alleged that Israel forces committed field executions and sexual abuse.
- The IDF said that it provided provided 5,000 liters of fuel, two generators, and medical equipment to Indonesia Hospital.
- The Houthis reported that they had shot down a US MQ-9 Reaper UAV over the Al Bayda Governorate.
- Israeli forces forced a Palestinian man to demolish his house in the Jabel Mukaber neighborhood of East Jerusalem saying that it was built without a permit.
- Israeli forces opened fired at a vehicle in the vicinity of the Shobaki roundabout in the southern area of Tulkarm, wounding its driver and later detaining him.
- Clashes broke out between Palestinians and Israeli forces during an IDF raid in Teqoa.
- A 21-year-old female Palestinian journalism student was killed after being shot in Jenin.

=== 29 December ===
- An Israeli strike on a home in Al Nafaq Street of northern Gaza City killed at least three people and injured many others, including women and children.
- An IDF raid in Hama, south of Jenin, triggered confrontations with Palestinian fighters.
- An Israeli strike on a house in Kaf Miraj area, north of Rafah killed two people including a woman and injured several others.
- Israeli shelling hit the top floor of the Baptist Hospital.
- NNA reported Israeli strikes including in areas between Markaba and Rab Thalathin.
- Israeli forces arrested a 38-year-old Palestinian in Tuqu after houses were searched and ransacked in the area.
- The Israeli Health Ministry said that it is preparing to submit a report to Alice Jill Edwards, the UN's special rapporteur on torture, saying that hostages freed in an exchange deal past year, including children, suffered physical and sexual abuse during captivity per testimonies of freed hostages. Hamas denied the accusations.
- A fifth Palestinian infant died of hypothermia in Deir al-Balah.
- Israeli strikes hit one of the floors of the al-Wafa Hospital in the western part of Gaza City, killing at least seven Palestinians and injuring others, some seriously. The IDF reported that it targeted militants from a Shujayea unit of Hamas in a command and control complex.
- The Gaza Interior Ministry announced the death of the head of Remal police station in Gaza City in an Israeli air strike.
- Five projectiles were launched from north Gaza towards Israel, two of which were intercepted and the rest likely hitting open areas. Later, the IDF issued evacuation orders for a large area in the vicinity of Jabalia, saying that rockets were launched from there.
- The al-Qassam Brigades reported that it blew up a building containing Israeli soldiers in the east of the Jabalia refugee camp in collaboration with the Al-Aqsa Martyrs Brigades. The al-Quds Brigades reported that it targeted an Israeli Merkava tank using a high-explosive device and an IDF rescue force using a Yasin-105 rocket in the same area.
- Israeli shelling northwest of Nuseirat refugee camp killed nine Palestinians and injured at least 15 others, including women and children.
- The IDF announced that a soldier from the 9th Battalion of the 401st Armored Brigade was killed while fighting in Jabalia when he was hit by the rotation of the turret in his tank. It also added that a soldier from the 931st Battalion of the Nahal Brigade was critically injured during fighting with Hamas militants in Beit Hanoun.
- The IDF and Shin Bet announced that 14 Hamas militants including six militants who participated in the 7 October attacks were killed in the past month.
- At least 11 people, mostly civilians, were killed in an Israeli airstrike on a former Syrian Army weapons depot in Adra, Syria.
- NNA reported two series of Israeli strikes in Mais al-Jabal.

=== 30 December ===
- The Gaza Health Ministry reported that at least 57 Palestinians were killed in Israeli attacks in the past 48 hours, increasing its count of the Palestinian death toll in Gaza to 45,541.
- The IDF announced that an officer from the Tzabar Battalion of the Givati Brigade was critically wounded in northern Gaza.
- Amnesty International demanded the release of Kamal Adwan Hospital director Hussam Abu Safiya.
- The Washington Post and +972 Magazine reported that the IDF used AI for the war in Gaza.
- A sixth Palestinian infant died due to cold.
- Wafa reported that an Israeli strike in Zeitoun neighbourhood of Gaza City killed a civilian.
- The IDF conducted a secret raid on an underground facility used for producing Iranian missiles in Syria for disrupting weapons from reaching Hezbollah.
- The al-Quds Brigades said that it launched rockets towards West Jerusalem, Tel Aviv and various communities around Gaza in the last two days.
- The IDF said that it killed dozens of militants in Jabalia and found weapons, destroyed tunnels and militant infrastructure in the area.
- Israeli police and Shin Bet arrested an Israeli man who likely spied for Iran, accusing him of arson, graffiti, photographing in the vicinity of Benny Gantz's house.
- The Gaza Government Media Office accused the World Food Programme of violating protocol in securing aid trucks, resulting in the deaths of two Palestinians and injuries to dozens.
- Five Palestinian detainees died in Israeli custody, increasing the number of Palestinian detainees who died in Israeli custody since the start of the war to 55. Israeli authorities were accused of mental and physical abuse against Palestinian detainees. The IDF said that it was investigating several cases of alleged abuse of Gazan detainees by IDF personnel but "categorically" denied allegations of systematic abuse within its facilities used for detention. Far-right Israeli national security minister Itamar Ben-Gvir's office said that "Terrorists in Israeli prisons are granted supervised living conditions and accommodations appropriate for criminals." His office added that "the facilities operate in accordance with the law." It also said that "summer camp is over".
- The IDF announced that a soldier from the Netzah Yehuda Battalion of the Kfir Brigade was killed and three others were critically injured while fighting in Beit Hanoun, increasing the IDF death toll in Gaza to 395.
- The al-Qassam Brigades reported to have attacked a newly established IDF post in Jabalia refugee camp, killing five soldiers and destroying a Merkava tank. It also reported to have thrown hand grenades against an IDF four-wheel vehicle, inflicting casualties and destroyed an armoured troop carrier using an explosive shell in Beit Hanoun.
- Wafa reported that an Israeli strike in Jabalia killed four people and injured others including civilians.
- A rocket fired from central Gaza hit an open area in Kissufim.
- The IDF released a video, claiming that it was obtained from cameras owned by Hamas militants showing them planting roadside bombs just 45 meters from the Indonesia Hospital.
- The WFP said that five aid trucks were lost in Gaza because of armed looting.
- Israeli authorities forced a Palestinian family of six people, including four children in Jabel Mukaber, East Jerusalem to demolish their house.
- Two rockets were fired from north Gaza towards Israel.
- Clashes broke out during an IDF raid in Anabta.
- Israeli settlers abducted a Palestinian man from Al-Shuyukh in the presence of Israeli soldiers and attacked him before abandoning him in the vicinity of an IDF checkpoint.
- A ballistic missile was launched from Yemen towards Israel, causing sirens to sound throughout Israel. An 18-year-old girl was hit by a car and slightly wounded on her chest and limbs while rushing to a bomb shelter in Yavne.

=== 31 December ===
- An Israeli strike damaged a sewage pumping station in the Zeitoun neighbourhood of Gaza City.
- The Houthis said that it targeted Ben Gurion Airport, a power station in the south of East Jerusalem and reported to have attacked the American aircraft carrier USS Harry S. Truman.
- The IDF said that it killed Anas Muhammad Saadi Masri, the commander of PIJ's rocket division in northern Gaza sector who was responsible for launching rockets targeting Israeli forces and Israeli territory during 7 October attacks and during the war in a drone strike earlier this month.
- Israeli authorities demolished an apartment building owned by a Palestinian family which was under construction in al-Salam District, East Jerusalem.
- The Palestinian Central Bureau of Statistics said that Gaza GDP decreased by over 82 percent and unemployment rate increased to 80% due to the war. West Bank GDP also decreased by over 19 percent and unemployment rate increased to 35 percent.
- The Shin Bet reported to have thwarted 1,040 major "terror" attacks in West Bank and Jerusalem in 2024.
- A rocket was launched from southern Gaza towards Israel.
- Clashes erupted between Israeli forces and fighters in Beit Furik.
- An Israeli strike in Beit Lahia killed at least six people including women.
- The Houthis said that the US launched multiple strikes on Houthi targets in Yemen. The United States Central Command said that US Navy ships and aircraft struck a Houthi command and control facility and facilities used by Houthis for producing and storing advanced conventional weapons including missiles and unmanned aerial vehicles in Sana'a and Houthi-controlled coastal areas on 31 December and 30 December.
- Israel admitted that it assassinated Hamas leader Saleh al-Arouri.
- The Israeli Public Broadcasting Corporation reported Israeli airstrikes on targets in southern Lebanon, claiming that they were used for transporting weapons.
- The IDF said that it killed Abd al-Hadi Sabah, the commander of Hamas's West Khan Yunis Battalion's Nukhba platoon who led Nir Oz attack during the 7 October attacks in a recent drone strike. It also said that he was involved in numerous attacks against Israeli soldiers in Gaza.
- Israeli gunfire injured a young Palestinian man after clashes broke out during an IDF raid in Halhul. A woman was reportedly beaten up by Israeli soldiers.
- Israeli settlers attacked and injured a young man in the Arab Mlihat Bedouin community northwest of Jericho.
- The UN Human Rights Office said that Israeli strikes on and surrounding hospitals pushed healthcare system in Gaza to "the brink of total collapse". Israel's mission in Geneva accused Hamas of using hospitals for militant activity.

== January 2025 ==
=== 1 January ===
- The Gaza Health Ministry reported that at least 12 Palestinians were killed in Israeli attacks in the past 24 hours, increasing its count of the Palestinian death toll in Gaza to 45,553.
- Hamas launched two rockets from central Gaza towards Netivot, one of which was intercepted while the second hit an open area. The IDF issued evacuation orders for Bureij refugee camp, saying that rockets were launched from there. Later an Israeli strike hit Bureij refugee camp, killing a woman and child. The IDF said that it targeted a Hamas militant.
- Al Jazeera reported that an Israeli strike hit the house of Al Jazeera Arabic correspondent Rami Abu Taima in southern Khan Yunis, injuring several members of his family.
- The Institute for the Study of War and The Critical Threats Project said that that Palestinian fighters in Jabalia launched two small-scale attacks targeting Israeli forces one day prior.
- AP reported that an Israeli strike hit a house sheltering displaced people in Jabalia, killing at least 15 people, including four children and one woman, injuring over 20 others. The IDF said that it killed Hamas fighters.
- The Houthis reported to have shot down a US MQ-9 Reaper drone over Marib Governorate with a locally made surface-to-air missile.
- The IDF said that it destroyed a weapons factory in Rafah.
- Israel's Coordinator of Government Activities in the Territories said that 127 Palestinians, mostly children with their caregivers left the Gaza after security checks in the Kerem Shalom border crossing for medical treatment in UAE. It also said that 1,055 patients and their caregivers departed the Gaza via the crossing and flown to 13 different countries for medical treatment in recent months.
- Israel claimed responsibility for a commando operation which destroyed an Iranian missile manufacturing site in Masyaf used for producing precision missiles for Hezbollah on 8 September. Israeli airstrikes around the facility reportedly killed at least 27 people and injured 43 others.
- The IDF issued evacuation orders for Palestinians in an area in the northwest of Jabalia designated as D3 to move to central Gaza City after rocket fire on soldiers operating inside Gaza.
- Al Jazeera reported that a nurse died from injuries sustained during an Israeli strike in Kamal Adwan Hospital.
- Al Jazeera reported that a seventh Palestinian infant died due to cold.
- The Palestinian Authority temporarily suspended the broadcast of Al Jazeera in the West Bank, accusing the network of "inciting material" and "interference" in internal affairs of Palestine. The network denied the accusations.

=== 2 January ===
- The Gaza Health Ministry reported that at least 28 Palestinians were killed in Israeli attacks in the past 24 hours, increasing its count of the Palestinian death toll in Gaza to 45,581.
- NNA reported that Israeli forces set fire to a number of homes in Aitaroun.
- Al Jazeera reported that Israeli forces demolished the house of a Palestinian man in Bal'a who was accused of conducting an attack on them.
- Al Jazeera reported that an Israeli airstrike in the designated humanitarian area of Al-Mawasi killed 12 people, including a woman, and injured 15 others including children. Mahmoud Salah, the director-general of the Gaza police force operating under the Hamas government in the Gaza Strip, and his assistant, Hussam Mustafa Shawan were among those killed in the attack. The IDF said that it targeted Hussam Shahwan, who was allegedly the head of Internal Security Forces of Hamas in southern Gaza who was responsible for developing intelligence assessments in collaboration with al-Qassam Brigades in attacks on the Israeli forces in the Gaza.
- The Tulkarm Brigade said that it clashed with Israeli forces in Anabta.
- Israeli forces issued eviction orders for Palestinian families in the Khirbet Tana area, in the vicinity of Beit Furik.
- An Israeli strike in Deir el-Balah killed 10 Palestinian men who were members of local committees helping to secure aid convoys.
- Al Jazeera reported that an Israeli strike in Jabalia refugee camp killed 10 people.
- The al-Quds Brigades reported that its medical team succeeded in saving a hostage's life after he tried to commit suicide because of his psychological condition, which deteriorated after the Netanyahu government allegedly set new conditions which resulted in the failure of his release.
- Al Jazeera reported that a 14-year-old teenager was injured by Israeli gunfire in Jayyous.
- The Gaza Government Media Office said that number of aid workers killed since the start of the war had reached 736.
- An Israeli strike on the Gaza interior ministry headquarters in the centre of Khan Yunis killed six people and wounded several others.
- The IDF reported that IAF aircraft struck a Hamas command center inside the municipality building in Khan Yunis in humanitarian area.
- The IDF said it had intercepted a rocket launched from southern Gaza.
- The PIJ said that it launched a rocket from southern Gaza towards Holit. The IDF said that it intercepted the rocket.
- Al Jazeera reported that clashes erupted between Israeli forces and Palestinians during an IDF raid in Beit Furik.
- Al Jazeera reported that an Israeli strike in Gaza killed journalist Hassan al-Qishaoui.
- Nasser Hospital medical officials said that an Israeli strike in Khan Yunis killed five policeman.
- The IDF reported that its fighter jets struck medium-range rocket launchers in a Hezbollah position in southern Lebanon and another rocket launcher in the Iqlim al-Tuffah area, Nabatieh District.
- Al Jazeera reported that an Israeli bombardment hit a residential house in the Nuseirat refugee camp, killing at least five people including a woman and children.

=== 3 January ===
- The Gaza Health Ministry reported that at least 77 Palestinians were killed in Israeli attacks in the past 24 hours, increasing its count of the Palestinian death toll in Gaza to 45,658.
- An Israeli strike on a house in the Burj Bidas area of the Nuseirat camp killed at least two children and wounded several others.
- A ballistic missile launched from Yemen was intercepted by the IDF during early morning on 3 January, with fragments falling near Modi'in-Maccabim-Re'ut and in Har Gilo, causing minor damage. Twelve people were injured while running towards shelters, and nine were treated for acute anxiety. A UAV launched from Yemen was later intercepted outside Israeli territory by the IAF. The Houthis took responsibility for both the attacks, claiming to have successfully struck a power plant near Tel Aviv with a Palestine 2 missile and a military target in the Tel Aviv area with the UAV.
- A rock-throwing attack on an Israeli bus in Route 55 in the vicinity of Karnei Shomron slightly damaged the bus and injured its driver.
- NNA reported that the IDF conducted a bombing operation near Bani Haiyyan. It also reported another strike in Kfar Kila.
- A group of Israeli settlers attacked a Palestinian man in Masafer Yatta area, seriously injuring him.
- The IDF said that it arrested 42 people, confiscated four weapons and seized tens of thousands of shekels throughout the West Bank. It said that "terrorism" was thwarted at numerous targets".
- A shoulder-launched surface-to-air missile was fired by a militant in Bureij towards an IAF helicopter above Gaza, activating air raid sirens in Be'eri. The missile was shot down by Iron Dome. Afterwards, the IDF issued an evacuation order for Palestinian civilians in Bureij to move to al-Mawasi.
- The IDF said that it launched airstrikes in the last day targeting staging grounds for militants and Hamas command centers throughout the Gaza Strip. It reported that some of those sites were embedded in schools which sheltered displaced Palestinians and said that it took steps to mitigate civilian casualties.
- The IDF issued an evacuation order for people inside Indonesia Hospital. The IDF denied that it ordered the hospital to evacuate. However Palestinian medics disputed this statement.
- An Israeli strike on a civil defence vehicle in eastern Deir el-Balah killed a Palestinian man and wounded two others. The al-Qassam Brigades said that it targeted an IDF tank in Deir el-Balah.
- Lebanese security forces searched passengers from a Mahan Air plane suspected of transferring funds to Hezbollah.
- The IDF said that its Nahal Brigade killed several militants, demolished infrastructure used by them including Hamas tunnels and located weapons in Beit Hanoun during the last week.
- Two rockets were fired from northern Gaza towards Sderot, one of which hit the vicinity of Nir Am while another hit an open area.
- Israel's Coordinator of Government Activities in the Territories said that it delivered 1,200 units of blood and 3,000 units of plasma to Nasser Hospital.
- The IDF reported that it found rocket-propelled grenades in a child's bedroom in a residential building while the Givati Brigade killed militants who planted explosive devices in the vicinity of their operating area in Jabalia.
- Israeli settlers attacked the outskirts of Al-Mughayyir, Ramallah and Salem under the protection of Israeli soldiers.
- The Jenin Brigades reported that the Palestinian National Security Forces turned Jenin hospital into a military barracks and arrested nurses who treated the injured in Jenin refugee camp. It also reported to have seized a high-tech weapon after expelling a security officer from one of the homes.
- Several Palestinians were wounded by gunfire and tear gas by Israeli forces during clashes throughout the West Bank.
- The IDF issued evacuation orders for al-Awda Hospital after damaging an emergency department in prior attacks, injuring two people. The IDF denied that it ordered the hospital to evacuate. However Palestinian medics disputed this statement.
- Gaza Civil Defense said that an Israeli airstrike in Shuja'iyya killed seven people including four children, a woman, and a freelance journalist.
- A Palestinian Authority security forces officer died in an accident during clashes with armed militant groups in Jenin.
- Israeli settler attacks under the protection of Israeli soldiers wounded seven people in Silwad.
- The IDF and Israeli police said that it identified several attempts to smuggle from Israel to Gaza with drones and thwarted another attempt overnight. Both said that it believed that drugs or other contraband were smuggled using drones, and detained a suspect.
- NNA reported that Israeli forces set fire to houses in Houla, Marjayoun.
- A child was wounded in the eye due to shrapnel from bullets fired by Israeli soldiers in Teqoa.

=== 4 January ===
- The Gaza Health Ministry reported that at least 59 Palestinians were killed in Israeli attacks in the past 24 hours, increasing its count of the Palestinian death toll in Gaza to 45,717.
- An Israeli strike on a house on al-Sahaba Street, west of Gaza City killed three people including a woman.
- An Israeli strike on a vehicle in Salah al-Din Road killed six Palestinian security guards helping provide humanitarian aid. The IDF reported that it conducted strikes on Hamas militants using Gaza aid routes for militant activities. It also reported that it hit four Hamas militants in a separate airstrike on a vehicle in Deir al-Balah.
- NNA reported Israeli strikes in Bani Haiyyan and Markaba.
- The al-Qassam Brigades reported that it destroyed four IDF Merkava tanks in the Gaza Strip and targeted a fifth in Jabalia. It also claimed responsibility for launching a rocket at an IDF helicopter.
- An Israeli strike on a residential house in the central part of the al-Mawasi safe zone seriously wounded seven members of a family.
- The Institute for the Study of War and the Critical Threats Project said that three rockets were launched from Gaza one day prior, two of them landed inside Israel and one malfunctioned after launch. Hamas and National Resistance Brigades fighters carried out mortar attacks on Israeli forces in Jabalia and detonated an improvised explosive device and a penetrator on Israeli armour.
- An Israeli strike on a home in the Shujayea neighbourhood, east of Gaza City killed at least 11 Palestinians including children and trapped several others including children and women under the rubble.
- The IDF said that it destroyed a Hamas officers neighborhood in the vicinity of Beit Hanoun which served as a militant compound overlooking Israel.
- One person was killed and nine others were wounded, four of them critically during an IDF raid in Balata Camp. The IDF said that it fired at militants who fired explosives, molotov cocktails, rocks and fireworks towards its forces.
- Hamas launched a rocket from the north Gaza, activating air raid sirens in Netiv Ha'asara and causing damage to the Erez Crossing and an area near an aid truck compound.
- The IDF said that it destroyed an underground factory used by Hamas for manufacturing weapons in central Gaza.
- The Gaza Health Ministry said that Indonesia Hospital went out of service.
- Israeli settlers burned agricultural facilities in the vicinity of Al-Mughayyir, Ramallah.
- UNIFIL accused an IDF bulldozer of destroying a border marker at the Israeli-Lebanese border and a Lebanese Armed Forces observation tower in the vicinity of a UNIFIL positions.
- Israeli gunfire wounded a 16-year-old teenager during clashes between Israeli forces and residents in al-Dhahr area of Beit Ummar.
- Israeli strikes in Bureij and Deir al-Balah killed six people, including a child.
- An Israeli strike on a house near Al-Amal Hospital in Khan Yunis significantly damaged several facilities of the hospital and critically wounded one person.
- An Israeli strike on a house in Nuseirat refugee camp injured a number of people including children.
- An Israeli airstrike in Sheikh Radwan neighborhood of Gaza City killed 13 people and trapped several others including a woman and children under the rubble.

=== 5 January ===
- The Gaza Health Ministry reported that at least 88 Palestinians were killed in Israeli attacks in the past 24 hours, increasing its count of the Palestinian death toll in Gaza to 45,805.
- Israeli settlers protected by Israeli soldiers threw stones towards Palestinian agricultural workers in Khirbet Abu Falah and set fire to a Palestinian house on its outskirts.
- The IDF said that it intercepted a ballistic missile launched towards Israel from Yemen outside Israel's borders. The Houthis said it successfully targeted Orot Rabin power plant.
- Arab media reported that the US and UK conducted three rounds of strikes in Saada.
- At least one person was injured and arrested during clashes between Israeli forces and Palestinian fighters during an IDF raid in Meithalun.
- The IDF arrested 20 people including children from the West Bank.
- The IDF said that it struck more than 100 targets in Gaza over the weekend, killing dozens of Hamas militants. It also said that it struck several sites used for launching rockets.
- A court in Brazil ordered an investigation against an Israeli soldier who was visiting the country after the Hind Rajab Foundation filed a report about his alleged war crimes in Gaza. Later he fled from Brazil.
- An IDF source said that a Palestinian woman attempted to stab Israeli civilians who entered Deir Qaddis. Israeli Public Broadcasting Corporation reported a suspected stabbing on an Israeli woman who reportedly entered into the area to wash her car.
- An Israeli strike in Jabalia refugee camp killed Palestinian writer, poet and journalist Mohammad Hijazi.
- Israel Border Police said that it killed a wanted Palestinian militant in Meithalun after he opened fire on soldiers while trying to arrest him. Palestinian Authority's Palestinian Security Services said that he served as a first lieutenant in its Palestinian Preventive Security. It also said that it seized 20 handguns from a vehicle stopped by soldiers in the vicinity of Nablus and detained 19 wanted Palestinians.
- Israeli Defense Minister Israel Katz accused Hezbollah of still not withdrawing beyond the Litani river per the ceasefire terms.
- An eighth infant died due to hypothermia in Gaza.
- An Israeli strike on a home in Nuseirat refugee camp wounded two Palestinians including a child who was critically wounded.
- The IDF said that it spotted several Palestinians climbing over Israel's West Bank barrier in the vicinity of IDF's Central Command base in northern Jerusalem. It said that no suspects infiltrated the base. Two suspects were detained outside the base and several others fled.
- The IDF said that a soldier from Tzabar battalion of Givati Brigade was critically injured during operational activity in north Gaza.
- The IDF said that it killed Saad Said Zaki Dahnon, a PIJ company commander and the deputy head of its rocket unit in north Gaza who participated in the 7 October attacks and involved in several attacks against soldiers in Beit Lahia following close-quarters battle with soldiers from the Givati Brigade in Jabalia.
- The IDF reported that it conducted a drone strike against a group of Hamas militants in a command center in the Khan Yunis area of the Israeli-designated humanitarian zone in south Gaza. It also reported that it carried out a separate strike in the Deir al-Balah area of the humanitarian zone targeting a PIJ militant who had conducted attacks from the area.
- An Israeli air strike in Bureij refugee camp killed two people including a child.
- A 17-year-old boy was killed during an IDF raid in Askar Camp. Palestinian fighters targeted Israeli forces using locally made explosive devices in the camp.
- An Israeli drone strike killed two farmers in the Musabbeh area of northern Rafah.
- NNA reported an Israeli bombing in Marjayoun.

=== 6 January ===
- The Gaza Health Ministry reported that at least 49 Palestinians were killed in Israeli attacks in the past 24 hours, increasing its count of the Palestinian death toll in Gaza to 45,854.
- An Israeli strike in Bureij killed three people including a five-year-old child.
- Israeli strikes hit al-Awda Hospital, including strikes which destroyed its fuel tank and its last generator.
- An Israeli strike hit a home in the vicinity of the Omari mosque in the Daraj neighbourhood of Gaza City, killing a woman and a child.
- An Israeli strike in Nuseirat refugee camp killed Tharabat Salim, a volunteer doctor in Al-Aqsa Martyrs Hospital. Another strike killed twins in north Gaza.
- A gun attack on a bus and two cars carrying Israelis in the vicinity of Al-Funduq killed three people including two women and a police officer and injured eight others including the bus driver. After the attack Israeli prime minister Benjamin Netanyahu's office said that he approved operations for capturing attackers and a series of additional defensive and offensive operations in West Bank. The al-Qassam Brigades said that it conducted the attack in collaboration with PIJ and Al-Aqsa Martyrs' Brigades. It also said that the mastermind of attack was Jaafar Ahmed Dababseh, who was killed by Israeli soldiers one day prior in Talluza.
- Two IDF soldiers from the Nahal Brigade's 932nd Battalion, one of them holding a rank of major, were killed fighting Palestinian militants in Beit Hanoun.
- Three rockets were fired from north Gaza towards Sderot, one of which was intercepted, the second lightly damaging a house and the third hitting an open area.
- Israeli settlers attacked vehicles belonging to Palestinians in Burin, Nablus.
- The Palestinian Authority ordered the shutdown of several Al Jazeera websites for four months in the West Bank.
- Israeli settlers attacked cars belonging to Palestinians after blocking several roads between Nablus, Qalqilya, Tulkarm and Jenin.
- The Houthis reported to have thwarted a British-Saudi intelligence operation.
- The Israeli police and Shin Bet arrested four minors suspected of participating in attacks against Israeli forces in the West Bank.
- An Israeli strike in Khiam killed at least seven people.
- Wafa reported that an Israeli drone strike in al-Maqousi area northwest of Gaza City killed a Palestinian civilian.
- The IDF said that two soldiers from the reconnaissance unit of Nahal Brigade were critically injured during fighting in the north Gaza.
- The World Food Programme said that Israeli forces opened fire on its convoy which was clearly marked and received prior security clearances from Israeli authorities in the vicinity of Wadi Gaza checkpoint in Gaza one day prior.
- The Lebanese army said that it deployed to areas around Naqoura in collaboration with UNIFIL following the withdrawal of the IDF.
- Wafa reported that an Israeli drone strike in al-Maqousi area northwest of Gaza City killed a Palestinian civilian.
- The Houthis said that it struck the American aircraft carrier USS Harry S. Truman with two winged missiles and four drones north of the Red Sea and thwarted the US military's planned air strike against Yemen. It also reported that it fired drones at an IDF target in the Tel Aviv area and Ashkelon.
- Israeli settlers from Hilltop Youth burned vehicles and vandalised houses in Hajjah as an apparent revenge for gun attack which killed three Israelis and wounded eight others. Israeli settlers set fire to a building of a Palestinian farmer north of Ramallah.
- An Israeli strike on a house in Bureij refugee camp killed at least four people including children and injured at least 13 others.
- Israeli authorities confiscated 262 dunums (262,000 square metres) of Palestinian land northeast of Jerusalem.
- The IDF said that it killed two militants in an airstrike after they fired at soldiers in Tammun. It also said that it killed another militant in close-quarters battle in Talluza. The al-Qassam Brigades announced that Israeli forces killed Jaafar Dababsah, one of its senior commanders in Wadi al-Badhan. An Israeli soldier was also critically wounded.
- Israeli air strikes in Sheikh Radwan neighborhood of northern Gaza City killed four Palestinians, injured dozens and trapped several others including civilians under the rubble.

=== 7 January ===
- The Gaza Health Ministry reported that at least 31 Palestinians were killed in Israeli attacks in the past 24 hours, increasing its count of the Palestinian death toll in Gaza to 45,885.
- An Israeli soldier from the Nahal Brigade's reconnaissance unit was killed fighting Hamas in north Gaza, increasing the IDF death toll in Gaza to 398.
- Three Palestinian fighters including freed prisoner Yousef Muhanna, considered as one of the founders of the Tulkarm Brigade were wounded after Palestinian National Security Forces opened fire on a vehicle carrying them in Attil. Muhanna was critically wounded.
- Palestinian youths threw molotov cocktails at vehicles belonging to Israeli settlers in Huwara.
- Israeli forces destroyed the entrance to the Far'a Camp Services Committee in Far'a and entered the building, while IDF bulldozers destroyed infrastructure in the camp, including roads.
- The IDF reiterated evacuation orders for over 60 villages in southern Lebanon.
- Two people were wounded after being beaten by Israeli forces in Tammun. It also arrested three students from Birzeit University.
- Israeli forces demolished a home owned by a Palestinian resident in Jabal Mukaber neighbourhood of East Jerusalem.
- An aid worker died from injuries sustained in an Israeli strike on a distribution point in Gaza two days prior.
- Israel's Coordinator of Government Activities in the Territories said that it facilitated the entry of more than 1,070 humanitarian aid trucks to Gaza in the last week.
- Israeli bulldozers demolished a nursery and carwash in the vicinity of Salfit, saying that they were near Ariel.
- The IDF said that its Kfir Brigade withdrew from north Gaza following 64 days of operations. It said that the brigade killed over 300 militants, including participants in the 7 October attacks, while fighting in Beit Lahia, Beit Hanoun and Sheikh Zayed neighborhoods.
- The Lebanese army said that it started deploying its units in Aalma ash-Shaab, Tayr Harfa and Bint Jbeil among other villages and towns following the IDF's withdrawal.
- Palestinian criminal gangs hijacked six fuel tankers in the Gaza Strip.
- 112 family members of hostages held in Gaza filed a petition in Supreme Court of Israel accusing the Netanyahu government of violating the Basic Laws of Israel by refusing to sign a deal for the release of hostages.
- An Israeli strike hit a tent in the al-Mawasi safe zone, killing four children.
- Israeli magazine Hamakom Hachi Ham Bagehenom reported that a Palestinian used as a human shield in Gaza by Israeli soldiers was errantly shot dead by an IDF officer.
- The IDF chief Herzi Halevi said that IDF will force Hamas for releasing all hostages.
- Israeli strikes on tents and two houses in Khan Yunis killed at least 13 people, including eight children and five women. Another Israeli strike on a car in Khan Yunis killed four people including two men. The IDF said that it targeted militants who participated in the 7 October attacks.
- Israeli Public Broadcasting Corporation reported that it revealed terms for a prisoner exchange deal with Hamas.
- Clashes broke out between Israeli forces and locals in Beita and Sebastia.
- An Israeli strike destroyed a building in Al-Shati refugee camp and surrounding houses, killing five people including a boy and injuring several others including girls.

=== 8 January ===
- The Gaza Health Ministry reported that at least 51 Palestinians were killed in Israeli attacks in the past 24 hours, increasing its count of the Palestinian death toll in Gaza to 45,936.
- Israeli settlers threw rocks at cars belonging to Palestinians in Jinsafut. They also set fire to houses and properties in at least six Palestinian villages in revenge for a gun attack which killed three Israelis and wounded eight others.
- An Israeli strike on a house near the Abu al-Amin intersection in the Sheikh Radwan neighbourhood of Gaza City killed a 15-day-old infant and wounded more people.
- Clashes were reported between Palestinian National Security Forces and Palestinian fighters in Jenin.
- An Israeli strike in Bureij refugee camp killed two people including an infant.
- An Israeli strike in Bureij refugee camp killed 10 people, most of them women and children from the same family.
- An Israeli strike on a house in Deir al-Balah killed three people including a woman.
- An Israeli drone strike in Tammun killed three people including two children and wounded several others. The IDF said that it targeted a group of militants.
- A woman with kidney disease died after the Nasser Hospital ran out of electricity while she was on the dialysis machine. Later, it said that a limited amount of fuel was received by it which will delay a complete halt of operations for two days. Médecins Sans Frontières said that Al-Aqsa Martyrs Hospital is also on the verge of stopping operations due to the same reason.
- The Commission of Prisoners' Affairs and the Palestinian Prisoner's Society said that former prisoner Ismail Taqatqa died after he was subjected to "medical crimes" in an Israeli jail.
- Israeli forces arrested at least 45 Palestinians including a child and two women from the West Bank.
- Israeli soldiers fired tear gas towards Kisan School east of Bethlehem, injuring several teachers and students. Palestinians in the school reportedly threw stones at IDF vehicles when Israeli forces launched the gas.
- An Israeli strike on a multi-storey house in the Sheikh Radwan neighbourhood of Gaza killed at least 10 people.
- An Israeli strike hit a group of Palestine Telecommunications Company employees who were maintaining towers in Shuja'iyya, seriously injuring four.
- United States Central Command said that it carried out "precision strikes" on two underground facilities used by Houthis for storing Advanced Conventional Weapon in Yemen. The Houthi-run Al-Masirah reported seven raids in Sanhan and Bani Bahlul District of Sanaa and Harf Sufyan District of 'Amran Governorate.
- Haaretz reported that Netanyahu government was blocking UN investigations into alleged sexual crimes of Hamas during the 7 October attacks to avoid probes into alleged abuse against Palestinian prisoners.
- Médecins Sans Frontières said that access to healthcare in H2 area of Hebron was seriously compromised.
- An Israeli strike on Halima school serving as shelter for displaced Palestinians in Jabalia killed nine people. The IDF reported that it struck Hamas militants operating from the school.
- An Israeli strike on an amusement park in Gaza City killed five people including civilians.
- US Secretary of State Antony Blinken said that over a third of Israeli forces withdrew from Lebanon.
- The IDF said that the bodies of Israeli hostages Yosef and Hamza Al Zayadni were recovered from a tunnel during an operation in Rafah, along with the bodies of two Hamas militants.
- The Tulkarem Battalion reported that it ambushed an Israeli infantry force in collaboration with the al-Qassam Brigades. It said that it "confirmed casualties" on Israeli soldiers in al-Ghanem neighbourhood of the Tulkarem refugee camp.
- Palestinian National Security Forces arrested independent journalist Jarrah Khalaf for his reporting of clashes between it and fighters in Jenin refugee camp.
- Three Israeli soldiers from the 401st Armoured Brigade's 46th Battalion were killed in Beit Hanoun when their tank was hit by the detonation of a large explosive device planted by Palestinian militants; this increased the IDF's death toll in Gaza to 401. Three other soldiers were seriously injured in the attack.
- The IDF said that air defenses intercepted a rocket fired from south Gaza towards Kerem Shalom.
- Israeli settlers allegedly set fire to a car belonging to Palestinians in Wadi Rahhal in the vicinity of Bethlehem.
- An Israeli air strike on a residential house in Deir el-Balah killed four people including two children and injured several others.

=== 9 January ===
- The Gaza Health Ministry reported that at least 70 Palestinians were killed in Israeli attacks in the past 24 hours, increasing its count of the Palestinian death toll in Gaza to 46,006. The IDF said that it killed more than 17,000 militants.
- The IDF issued evacuation orders for residents in Khallet al-Darbeh area of Azzun.
- An Israeli strike on a house in Nuseirat refugee camp killed four people including three children.
- Houthi-affiliated media outlet Al Masirah TV reported US UK air strikes in Amran governorate, Sanaa Governorate and Al Hudaydah Governorate.
- The Tulkarem Battalion reported that it blew up an IDF bulldozer in Nur Shams and attacked Israeli forces raiding the camp.
- Israel's Coordinator of Government Activities in the Territories reported that it facilitated the transfer of 6,750 liters of fuel, 10,000 liters of water, dozens of food crates and approximately 300 boxes of medical supplies to the hospitals in Gaza in the last three days.
- The IDF reported that an IAF drone struck a vehicle in southern Lebanon after identifying suspects loading weapons into it from buildings used by Hezbollah.
- Two Palestinian men were physically assaulted by Israeli forces at an IDF checkpoint in Hebron.
- An Israeli strike on Erbakan school in northern Gaza killed five people including a woman and a child and wounded 25 others. Another Israeli strike hit a motorbike in Khan Yunis, killing a civilian.
- The al-Quds Brigades reported that it targeted an Israeli soldier east of Gaza City.
- The Palestinian Authority said that it arrested 247 militant suspects during its raid in Jenin refugee camp.
- The IDF said that it killed Osama Abu Namus, commander of Sabra Battalion of Hamas, which is part of its Gaza City Brigade who was Hamas's significant source of knowledge and was responsible for attacks targeting Israel and Israeli soldiers in Gaza, particularly soldiers operating in the Netzarim Corridor and Mohammed al-Tarq, the deputy commander of the battalion who previously served as the commander in a Nukhba force company in the battalion and was also responsible for attacks against soldiers in Netzarim Corridor, along with other militants in separate strikes. It also said that it killed two commanders in the Nukbha force company in the Sabra Battalion in recent air strikes, one of whom was responsible for supplying weapons.
- The IDF said that air defences intercepted a drone above southern Israel which was launched "from the east". Another drone launched from Yemen was intercepted by the IAF above the Mediterranean Sea. Later, a third drone "launched from the east" towards Israel was intercepted by IAF above Mediterranean sea. The Houthis said its successfully fired three drones on Tel Aviv.

=== 10 January ===
- A peer-reviewed The Lancet study found that death toll due to war in Gaza may be 41% higher. An Israeli official said that "figures provided in this report do not reflect the situation on the ground".
- Israeli settler attacks were reported on Palestinian communities, Susya being one of them.
- An Israeli strike on the Hamad area of Khan Yunis killed one person and wounded others including civilians.
- The NNA agency reported that Israeli artillery hit Ayta ash-Shaab.
- The IDF said it had arrested 73 people, killed several militants from the West Bank, and seized seven weapons and funds used by militants in the last week.
- Mahmoud Abu Shahada, Nasser Hospital's orthopaedics department head, was released following an appeal filed in the Supreme Court of Israel. He was reportedly tortured and harshly treated at the hands of Israeli forces following his arrest at Nasser Hospital on 17 February.
- The Houthi-owned media outlet Al-Masirah reported that 12 strikes were conducted by US and British forces in Harf Sufyan District. It also reported that airstrikes also hit an area near Al Sabeen Square in Sanaa. Shortly after, Israeli strikes hit the Heyzaz power plant and infrastructure at the ports of Hodeidah and Ras Isa. Israeli defence minister Israel Katz said that there will be no impunity for Houthi leaders. Al-Masirah reported that one person was killed and six others were wounded in Israeli strike in Ras Isa port.
- Heavy gunfire from Israeli forces and quadcopters hit the Indonesia Hospital in Gaza.
- The al-Qassam Brigades said that the majority of Israeli hostages held in northern Gaza "are now missing" because of IDF operations.
- Israeli soldiers detained eight Palestinians including a woman after a raid on a house in Qabatiya, located in the West Bank.
- An Israeli strike on a car in Tayr Debba killed five people and injured four others. The IDF reported that its drone strike targeted a vehicle loaded with weapons by Hezbollah militants.
- An Israeli sniper reportedly shot and killed Palestinian freelance journalist Saed Nabhan while covering the advance of Israeli forces in Nuseirat refugee camp among other journalists.
- An Israeli strike hit a residential building in Remal neighbourhood, west of Gaza City killed three people including a woman and a children and injured at least 10 others.
- Clashes were reported between Palestinian fighters and Palestinian National Security Forces around the Jenin refugee camp.
- Children were among those wounded in an Israeli strike in east of Gaza City.

=== 11 January ===
- The Gaza Health Ministry reported that at least 32 Palestinians were killed in Israeli attacks in the past 48 hours, increasing its count of the Palestinian death toll in Gaza to 46,537. It also said that 499 previously unreported deaths were also added to the total.
- Clashes were reported between Palestinian fighters and Israeli forces in the centre of the Arroub camp in which a young Palestinian man was shot by Israeli forces.
- Houses were searched and arrests made during an IDF raid in Qabatiya where clashes erupted with local Palestinians.
- The Institute for the Study of War and the Critical Threats Project reported that satellite imagery showed that the IDF expanded "clearing operations" northwest of the Nuseirat refugee camp. They also reported that PIJ fighters carried out a mortar attack on Israeli forces south of Rafah.
- Israeli air strikes destroyed two houses in Gaza City, killing four people, including civilians, and injuring several others.
- The IDF said that air defences intercepted one rocket fired from the south Gaza towards Kerem Shalom.
- An Israeli drone opened fire on the only Gaza civil defence vehicle in Jabalia. Gaza Civil Defense said that working of a number of fire and rescue vehicles in several governorates were disrupted because of lack of equipment and spare parts for repairing and operating them.
- The IDF said that it killed three militants hiding in a building in Jabalia. It also said that it found a Palestinian tunnel shaft used by militants inside the building.
- A young man was shot in the foot during clashes with Israeli forces in Yatma.
- An Israeli strike on Halawa School a school serving as shelter in Jabalia killed at least eight people, including two children and two women, with 30 others injured, including 19 children. The IDF stated that it conducted a strike on Hamas militants occupying the school.
- The Gaza Municipality said that 75 percent of water wells and over 100,000 linear metres of water networks were damaged because of Israeli attacks.
- The Lebanese Army said that it was concluding its deployment of soldiers to the western part of southern Lebanon after the withdrawal of Israeli forces.
- An Israeli strike on a group of people on al-Nafaq Street of the Daraj Quarter in Gaza City killed at least four people and injured several civilians.
- An Israeli strike in Kounin injured two people. The IDF said that it conducted a drone strike after spotting several Hezbollah militants leaving a building known to be used by Hezbollah.
- Dozens of masked Israeli settlers under the protection of Israeli soldiers attacked Turmus Ayya, triggering clashes. Israeli soldiers opened fire on villagers, injuring three Palestinians, and detained at least four others.
- An Israeli air strike in Deir el-Balah killed three people including a six-year-old girl and seriously wounded several other members of her family.
- The Houthis said that it fired cruise missiles and explosive-laden drones towards the USS Harry Truman and a number of ships supporting it and reported that it forced them to flee north.
- Four Israeli soldiers were killed and six were injured, two of them seriously during combat in north Gaza, increasing the IDF death toll in Gaza to 402. Per an initial IDF probe, the soldiers were hit by an explosive device detonated by militants, who also opened fire towards them in Beit Hanoun.
- Israeli settlers attacked Palestinian farmers and set fire to their tents and livestock barns in Kisan.
- The IDF said that its warplanes killed three suspects in Shebaa Farms who were moving inside Lebanese territory in the vicinity of the Israeli border.

=== 12 January ===
- The Gaza Health Ministry reported that at least 28 Palestinians were killed in Israeli attacks in the past 24 hours, increasing its count of the Palestinian death toll in Gaza to 46,565.
- An ambulance officer died from wounds sustained in an Israeli bombardment in north Gaza.
- Israeli Public Broadcasting Corporation reported that the eight soldiers with the Givati Brigade were injured, three of them critically following an improvised explosive device detonated in northern Jabalia two days prior.
- Palestinian National Security Forces imposed a siege in Jenin refugee camp, preventing the entry of food and medical supplies. It also cut off water and electricity from large areas of the camp, and arrested a number of injured people from medical centers. They also warned journalists to stop covering developments in the camp and prevented them from entering.
- The IDF issued evacuation orders for Palestinian civilians in Block 662 of Nuseirat camp to flee to humanitarian zones in al-Mawasi, saying that militant organisations fired rockets from the area.
- An Israeli strike hit people collecting firewood in Mukhabarat, northwest of Gaza City, killing at least two Palestinians and injuring one person.
- Three teenagers were detained by Israeli forces during a raid in Beit Ummar.
- A medical source said that 5,000 Palestinians were killed or missing and 9,500 others were wounded since the start of the Siege of North Gaza.
- Israeli gunfire in the vicinity of Jaba' wounded two children.
- The Gaza Civil Defense said that 70 children were killed in Israeli strikes in Gaza in five days.
- Lawyers for Justice said that journalist Jarrah Khalaf is being tortured in a Palestinian Authority jail for reporting on events in Jenin.
- Israeli settlers attacked vehicles belonging to Palestinians on a road between Nablus and Ramallah.
- Israeli settlers attacked Madama under the protection of Israeli soldiers.
- Israeli defense authorities said that they arrested two PIJ militants in Nablus who were en route to conducting a gun attack.
- The Tulkarm Brigade said that the Palestinian Authority opened fire on a vehicle carrying its fighters on 'Atara-Bal'a road.
- Clashes and blasts were reported in the Jenin refugee camp as Palestinian National Security Forces tried to enter the camp.
- The Commission of Detainees and Ex-Detainees Affairs of Palestinian Authority and the Palestinian Prisoner's Society released a report including testimonies from 23 prisoners held at al-Naqab Prison, situated in southern Israel and Naftali camp, a detention area in northern Israel who accused Israeli authorities of torturing them.
- An elderly woman died from wounds sustained in a Hezbollah rocket barrage in Nahariya on 25 November.
- Palestinian attackers allegedly threw rocks towards civilian cars in Haris, slightly injuring a 27-year-old woman and damaging several cars.
- Israeli airstrikes were reported north of the Litani River in Houmine al-Faouqa, Nabatieh District, and in Yanta, Beqaa Governorate. The IDF said that it attacked several Hezbollah sites including a rocket launcher, a Hezbollah military site and routes used for smuggling weapons to Hezbollah in Syrian-Lebanese border. It also said that it struck Hezbollah targets after notifying the ceasefire mechanism and accused it of failing to address "threats".

=== 13 January ===
- The Gaza Health Ministry reported that at least 19 Palestinians were killed in Israeli attacks in the past 24 hours, increasing its count of the Palestinian death toll in Gaza to 46,584.
- The IDF said that an IAF helicopter shot down a drone fired towards Israel from Yemen in the vicinity of Gvulot.
- NNA reported that Israeli forces conducted a "large bombing operation" in Kfar Kila and blew up several houses in Ayta ash-Shaab.
- Israeli forces detained two journalists from Palestine TV for two hours in Haris and forced them to delete camera recordings.
- Israeli drone strikes in Gaza City killed nearly 45 people, mostly women and children.
- The IDF said that air defences successfully intercepted one missile fired from Yemen towards Israel. Houthis said that it successfully hit a vital target in Tel Aviv-Jaffa area with a hypersonic ballistic missile and four drones.
- Five Israeli soldiers were killed and 10 others were injured, eight of them critically in an incident in north Gaza, increasing the IDF death toll in Gaza to 407. The IDF said that all of them served in the Reconnaissance Unit of the Nahal Brigade. According to an initial IDF investigation, the incident happened due to detonation of their explosives, which caused the collapse of the building they were in.
- The al-Qassam Brigades said that it raided a building housing 25 Israeli soldiers in Rafah and reported that it killed or injured all inside.
- Palestinian detainee Moataz Abu Zneid died in Israeli detention, increasing the number of Palestinians who died in Israeli jails since the beginning of war in Gaza to 55.
- Israel's ambassador to the UN Danny Danon accused Hezbollah of attempting to rebuild with Iranian help.

=== 14 January ===
- The Gaza Health Ministry reported that at least 61 Palestinians were killed in Israeli attacks in the past 24 hours, increasing its count of the Palestinian death toll in Gaza to 46,645.
- A ballistic missile was fired from Yemen towards Israel, triggering air raid sirens in several areas throughout central Israel. Eleven people were wounded while rushing to shelter and four others were treated for panic attacks. The IDF said that it successfully intercepted the missile. The Houthis said that it fired a "hypersonic ballistic missile" into Jaffa. A large cylinder which was part of the ballistic missile launched by Houthis damaged the roof of a house in Mevo Beitar and additional sharpnel impacts were identified by IDF in Tzur Hadassah and Beitar Illit.
- Two Israeli strikes hit Deir al-Balah, killing at least two women including a pregnant woman and four children. At least 12 others including four women were killed in two Israeli strikes in Khan Yunis.
- Journalist Mohammed Al-Talmas died from wounds sustained in an Israeli bombardment in Gaza City a day prior.
- An Israeli strike hit a house in the Daraj Quarter of Gaza City, injuring journalist Bashir Abu al-Shaar.
- An Israeli strike hit a building in Gaza City, killing at least six children. Another Israeli strike hit al-Shati refugee camp, killing one civilian.
- An Israeli strike in the coast of western Deir el-Balah killed a Palestinian fisherman.
- An Israeli strike hit a group of people near a junction in Gaza City, killing two people and injuring others including civilians.
- An Israeli strike hit a tent housing displaced Palestinians west of Nuseirat refugee camp, killing two people and seriously injuring a woman.
- The Houthis reported to have targeted a power station in Eilat using missiles and fired drones towards Tel Aviv.
- NNA reported that the IDF conducted large blasts in Mais al-Jabal and Kfar Kila, destroying civilian houses.
- The Jenin Brigades said that it accepted an initiative to end Palestinian infighting.
- Israel's COGAT said that a mobile bakery operated by World Central Kitchen in collaboration with COGAT started operations in Khan Yunis, producing more than 3,000 loaves of bread per hour.
- An Israeli drone fired three missiles on a group of people in the vicinity of Jenin refugee camp killing six people including a 15-year-old teenager and injuring several others. Israeli media reported that the target was a prominent militant within the camp. The al-Qassam Brigades said that four of its members were killed.
- An Israeli strike hit a house in the al-Nasr neighbourhood of Rafah, killing a woman and four children.

=== 15 January ===
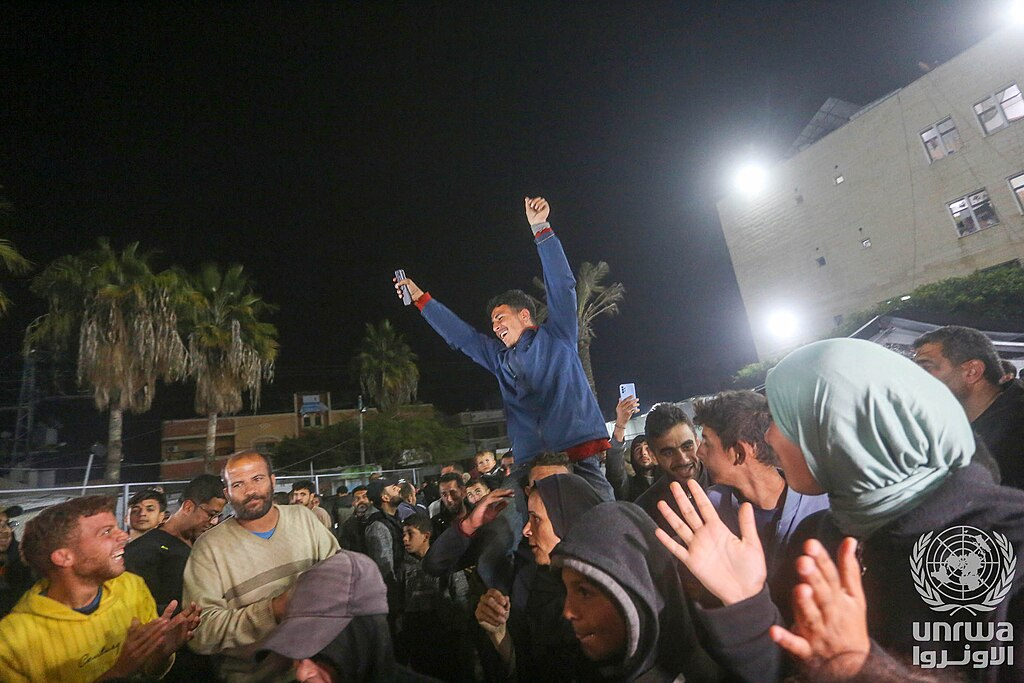
Palestinians in Deir al-Balah celebrating news of the agreement for a ceasefire announced on 15 January 2025

- The Gaza Health Ministry reported that at least 62 Palestinians were killed in Israeli attacks in the past 24 hours, increasing its count of the Palestinian death toll in Gaza to 46,707.
- An Israeli strike hit a house sheltering displaced people in the southern area of Deir al-Balah killing at least 13 people including a seven-year-old boy, three teenagers and injuring others.
- The IDF said that two soldiers were critically wounded and one soldier was slightly wounded when a roadside bomb planted by Palestinian militants hit a David light armored vehicle in Qabatiya.
- US president Joe Biden extended sanctions against several Israeli citizens, settler groups and a Palestinian armed group whom he accused of conducting attacks in the West Bank for another 12 months.
- NNA reported that the IDF conducted "a bombing operation" in Markaba.
- The IDF reported that it struck 50 targets including Hamas and PIJ militants in Gaza in the last day. It also reported that it struck a prominent militant in a school sheltering displaced people in Gaza City which killed at least five people. It said that it targeted militant cells and struck facilities used for storing weapons, tunnels, anti-tank firing sites, and buildings used by Hamas. It also said that it carried out "precise" strikes on Hamas militants in Khan Yunis and Deir el-Balah.
- An Israeli strike on Al-Farabi school which was sheltering displaced people in Gaza City killed seven people including an infant.
- Indonesia Hospital reportedly ran out of power due to Israeli artillery shelling. Israeli forces also started to bulldoze the western part of the facility.
- The IDF issued evacuation orders for residents in D5 area of Jabalia to move to shelters in central Gaza City, saying that militant groups fired rockets from the area.
- NNA reported Israeli shelling on the outskirts of Kfarchouba.
- The al-Quds Brigades reported that it killed and wounded the crew of two Israeli tanks by planting and detonating explosive devices. It also reported to have launched a mortar attack on an IDF command centre in the Netzarim Corridor.
- An Israeli strike on a group of people in Shati refugee camp killed journalist Aqel Saleh. Another Israeli strike hit a vehicle in Nuseirat, killing journalist Ahmed Abu Alrous and three others.
- The IDF said that it conducted an air strike in Jenin. The PA Health Ministry said that five people were killed.
- Israel and Hamas reached an agreement for a ceasefire and the release of some hostages and prisoners following negotiations in Qatar.
- An Israeli strike on a residential block in the Sheikh Radwan neighborhood of Gaza City killed at least 20 people.

=== 16 January ===
- The Gaza Health Ministry reported that at least 81 Palestinians were killed in Israeli attacks in the past 24 hours, increasing its count of the Palestinian death toll in Gaza to 46,788.
- QNN reported that Israeli settlers burned a vehicle in the al-Kassara area, south of Hebron.
- Al Jazeera reported that Israeli strikes in Gaza killed several people including 21 children and 25 women.
- Al Jazeera reported that Israeli forces arrested a Palestinian woman during an IDF raid in al-Issawiya, in the vicinity of East Jerusalem.
- Al Jazeera reported that an Israeli strike in Jabalia killed at least 20 people including women and children, seriously injured others and trapped several under the rubble.
- Palestinians reported that Israeli settlers attacked residents in Huwara, injuring a Palestinian child.
- The al-Qassam Brigades reported that the IDF targeted an area where a female Israeli hostage slated for release in the first stage of the truce was being held.
- The IDF said that it killed Hamas Nukhba force militant Muhammad Hashem Zahdi Abu al-Rous who took part in the Nova music festival massacre during the 7 October attacks in an airstrike in Gaza in the previous day. It also reported that the IAF carried out more than 50 strikes throughout Gaza and killed several more Hamas and PIJ members and struck buildings used by militant groups, arms storing facilities, rocket launchers, sites used for manufacturing arms, and observation posts in the last day.
- Israeli gunfire wounded three Palestinian teenagers during a raid in Askar Camp.

=== 17 January ===
- The Gaza Health Ministry reported that at least 88 Palestinians were killed in Israeli attacks in the past 24 hours, increasing its count of the Palestinian death toll in Gaza to 46,876.
- Israeli forces raided Tulkarm Camp, triggering clashes with Palestinian militants.
- Israeli Prime Minister Benjamin Netanyahu announced that a deal for returning hostages held in Gaza was reached.
- Palestinian officials said that Israeli strikes set back a ceasefire deal between the Palestinian Authority and the Jenin Battalion.
- Gaza civil defense said that Palestinian casualties after the announcement of the ceasefire deal increased to 116 deaths including 30 children and 32 women and over 265 injuries due to alleged Israeli strikes across Gaza.
- The Syrian public security directorate said that it thwarted an attempt to smuggle weapons to Lebanon through an illegal border crossing.
- UN secretary general António Guterres said that UNIFIL uncovered more than 100 weapons caches in southern Lebanon belonging to Hezbollah or other armed groups since the ceasefire between the group and Israel.
- The Israeli security cabinet voted to approve the hostage release-ceasefire agreement.
- The Houthis reported that the US conducted five air strikes on Harf Sufyan District. It also reported that it hit targets in central and southern Israel and a US aircraft carrier in the Red Sea.
- Israeli settlers set fire to vehicles belonging to Palestinians in Shuqba and cut down approximately 100 olive trees in Yasuf.
- The Netanyahu government added West Bank security enhancement as a war goal.
- NNA reported that the IDF blew up several houses in Mais al-Jabal and arrested a Syrian citizen who was grazing a herd of cattle on the outskirts of Rmaish.
- The Gaza hostage and ceasefire deal was approved by the Israeli cabinet.

=== 18 January ===
- The Gaza Health Ministry reported that at least 23 Palestinians were killed in the past 24 hours, increasing its count of the Palestinian death toll in Gaza to 46,899.
- The Palestinian Authority reached a deal with the Jenin Battalion to end clashes in Jenin and Jenin refugee camp.
- Gaza civil defense said that Palestinian casualties after the announcement of the ceasefire deal increased to 122 deaths including 33 children and 33 women and over 270 injuries due to Israeli strikes across Gaza.
- The IDF said that air defences intercepted two ballistic missiles fired towards Israel from Yemen. The Houthis reported that the ballistic missile and cruise missile they launched at two vital Israeli targets around Eilat had achieved their objectives.
- Israeli forces detained a woman in Dura to force her husband to surrender.
- The IDF reported that it carried out strikes on 50 militant targets including Hamas and PIJ operatives throughout Gaza.
- A 30-year-old Israeli man was critically injured in a stabbing attack by a 19-year-old Palestinian in Tel Aviv. The attacker was shot dead by an armed civilian.
- Israeli police said that it thwarted an attack at Qalandia checkpoint.
- Four children were shot and injured during an Israeli raid in Beit Ummar.
- The Houthis reported that they targeted the USS Harry S. Truman and other warships using drones and cruise missiles in the Red Sea and forced the vessel to leave the area.

== See also ==
- January 2025 Gaza war ceasefire
- Israeli disengagement from the Gaza Strip
