= Hadab al-Fawwar =

Village in West Bank, Palestine

- Municipality type D (Village council)

Arabic transcription(s)
  - Arabic: حدب الفوّار
- Location of Hadab al-Fawwar within Palestine
- Coordinates: 31°28′36″N 35°03′20″E
- Palestine grid: 155/098
- State: State of Palestine
- Governorate: Hebron

Government
  - Type: Village council

Population (2017)
  - Total: 2,354
- Name meaning: The hummock

Hadab al-Fawwar (Arabic: حدب الفوّار, lit. Sparkling Slope) is a Palestinian village located seven kilometers southwest of Hebron. The village is in the Hebron Governorate Southern West Bank. According to the Palestinian Central Bureau of Statistics, the village had a population of 2,354 in 2017. The primary health care facilities for the village are designated by the Ministry of Health as level 2. It is adjacent to the Palestinian refugee camp of Fawwar.

== History ==
Ceramics from the Byzantine era have been found here.

=== Ottoman era ===
In 1883 the PEF's Survey of Western Palestine (SWP) found here "Walls, a deep cistern, and a large tomb, sequently used as a stable."

== Bibliography ==
- Conder, C.R.; Kitchener, H.H. (1883). The Survey of Western Palestine: Memoirs of the Topography, Orography, Hydrography, and Archaeology. Vol. 3. London: Committee of the Palestine Exploration Fund.
- Dauphin, C. (1998). La Palestine byzantine, Peuplement et Populations. BAR International Series 726 (in French). Vol. III : Catalogue. Oxford: Archeopress. ISBN 0-860549-05-4.
- Palmer, E.H. (1881). The Survey of Western Palestine: Arabic and English Name Lists Collected During the Survey by Lieutenants Conder and Kitchener, R. E. Transliterated and Explained by E.H. Palmer. Committee of the Palestine Exploration Fund.
