= Fawwar, Hebron =

Palestinian refugee camp in Hebron

Fawwar
- Refugee Camp

Arabic transcription(s)
  - Arabic: مخيّم الفوّار
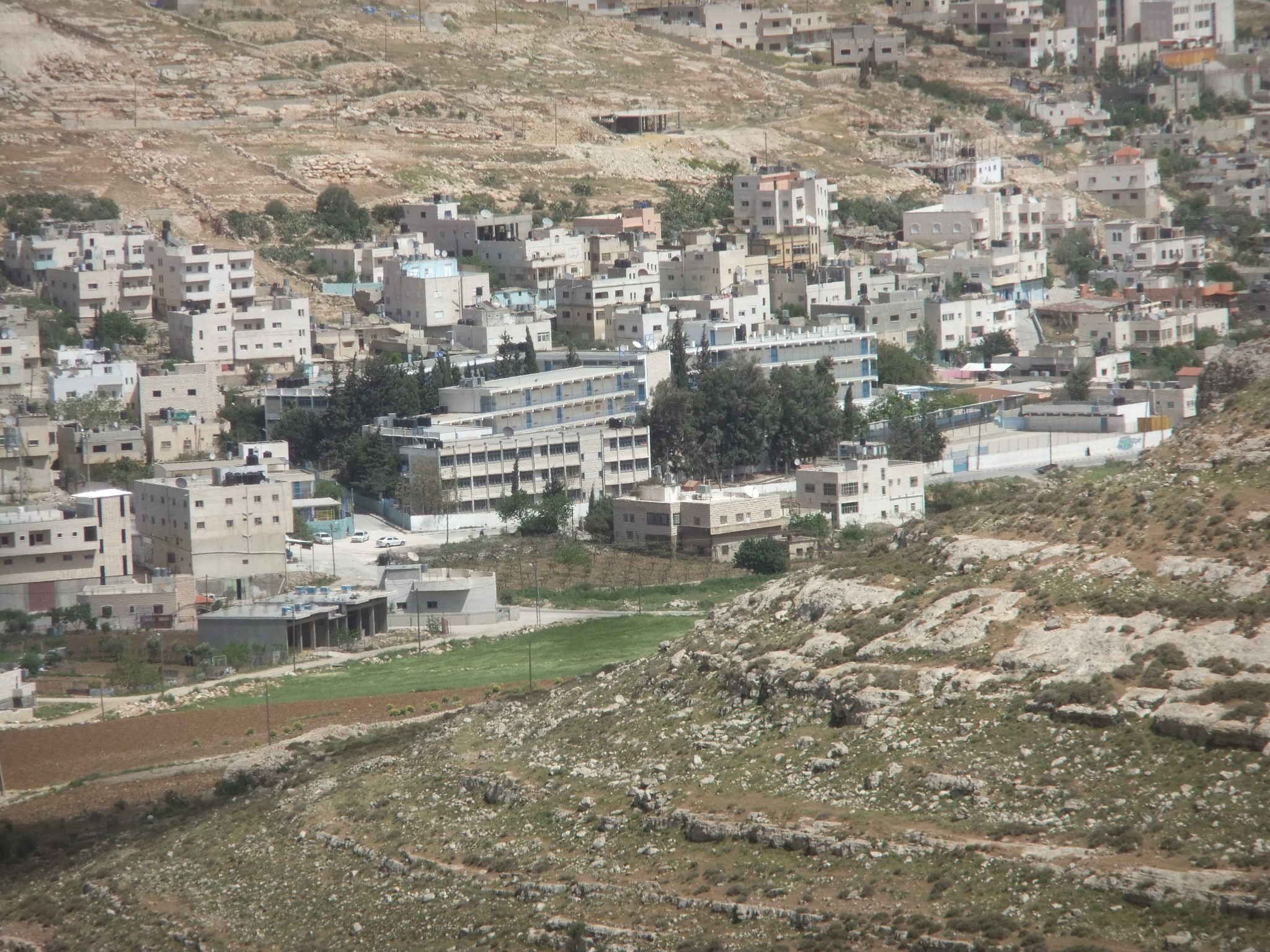
- Fawwar, 2013

- Location of Fawwar within Palestine
- Coordinates: 31°28′46″N 35°03′53″E
- State: State of Palestine
- Governorate: Hebron

Government
  - Type: Refugee Camp

Area
  - Total: 0.27 km^{2} (0.10 sq mi)

Population (2017)
  - Total: 7,641
  - Density: 28,000/km^{2} (73,000/sq mi)

Fawwar (Arabic: مخيّم الفوّار) is a Palestinian refugee camp adjacent to the town of Hadab al-Fawwar in the Hebron Governorate, located 6 km (3.7 mi) southwest of Hebron in the southern West Bank. According to the Palestinian Central Bureau of Statistics, the camp had a population of 7,641 in 2017.

== History ==
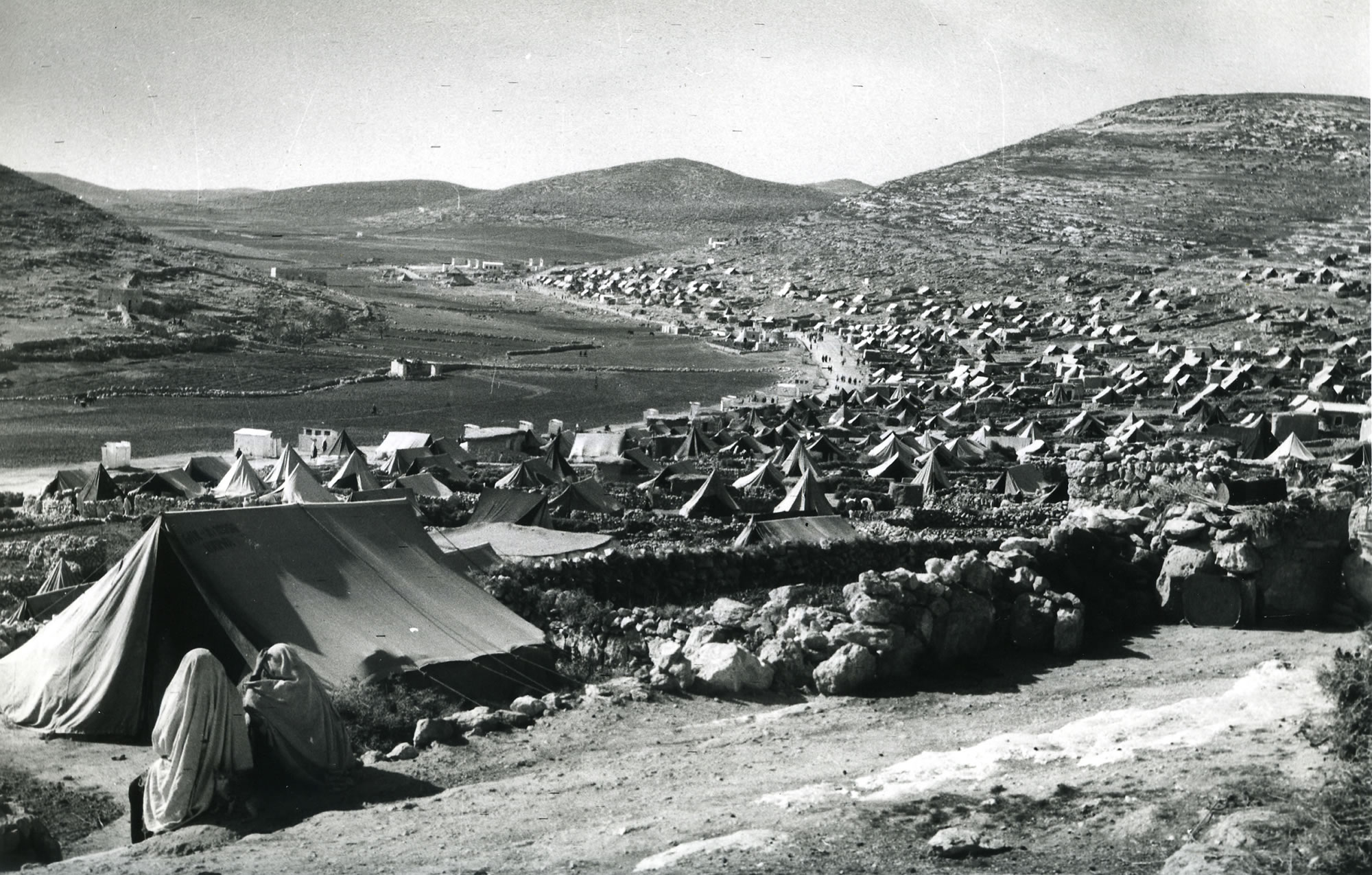
Fawwar refugee camp in 1951

Fawwar Camp was established in 1949 to accommodate Palestinian refugees displaced by the 1948 Palestinian expulsion and flight from Beersheba and Bayt Jibrin and the surrounding area. The camp was established on 350 dunams of land. There are two schools in the town: a boys' school and girls' school with roughly 1,050 students each.

Since the Six-Day War in 1967, Fawwar has been under Israeli occupation. The population in the 1967 census conducted by the Israeli authorities was 2,233.

On 12 May 2021 Hussein Titi (28), after an Israeli raid on the village led to the arrest of his neighbor, was shot dead when he went up to the roof of his house and peeked out to see what was happening.

On 13 May 13, 2020 Zeid Qaysiyah (17) was shot dead, with a bullet to his face, by a sniper posted over 100 m (330 ft) away, while Qaysiyah was watching, together with his nieces, an Israeli raid on the village conducted by the elite Israeli Duvdevan unit, which sought to arrest a mentally disabled local youth for comments he had made on Facebook.
