= 2023 Givat Shaul shooting =

Militant attack against Israeli civilians in Jerusalem

- Part of the Gaza war
- The attack site
- Native name: פיגוע הירי ביציאה מירושלים
- Location: 31°47′30″N 35°11′47″E; Givat Shaul Interchange, Jerusalem
- Date: 30 November 2023; 7:30 a.m.
- Target: Israelis
- Attack type: Mass shooting
- Weapons: M16 rifle, pistol
- Deaths: 4 civilians (including a pregnant woman); 2 attackers
- Injuries: 16
- Perpetrator: Hamas
- Assailants: Ebrahim Nemer; Murad Nemer
- Fatalities count include a civilian who was killed as a result of a friendly fire incident.

On 30 November 2023, two Palestinian gunmen killed three and wounded 16 Israeli civilians at a bus stop on the Givat Shaul Interchange in Jerusalem during the ceasefire of the Gaza war. A fourth individual, Yuval Kestelman (an armed bystander who shot at the gunmen), was shot and killed by responding IDF soldiers who mistook him for one of the attackers. Hamas claimed responsibility for the shooting.

== Background ==
The Givat Shaul neighborhood, located in the western part of the city, is one of the primary entrances to Jerusalem, and has been a target of attacks in the past. The 2023 shooting occurred within the context of the violent Gaza war, just hours after Hamas and Israel, the 2 primary belligerents in the war, agreed to the extension of a ceasefire.

According to Israeli Police, both attackers had been imprisoned in the past due to their affiliation with Hamas. Murad Nemer was imprisoned for 10 years because of his intention to carry out terrorist operations; his brother, Ibrahim Nemer was imprisoned in 2014 for the same reason. The men were both in their 30s and from the Sur Baher neighborhood of East Jerusalem.

== Attack ==
According to the Israeli Police and amateur camera footage, the two gunmen, 38-year-old Murad Nemer and 30-year-old Ibrahim Nemer, arrived at the bus stop in a car at around 7:30 a.m. local time. They exited the car carrying an M16 and a handgun. The attackers' vehicle contained a "large amount of ammunition," according to police. They then opened fire at the people waiting at the bus stop, killing 3 and injuring 16. Israeli police received reports of gunfire at about 7:40 a.m. local time. A bystander identified as 37-year-old Yuval Doron Kestelman, who noticed the attack while driving, opened fire on the attackers during the shooting, charging towards the attackers, killing one of the perpetrators. Kestelman urged other civilians to evacuate.

Two soldiers at the scene ran to the back of the building and got to the floor, got back up, and approached the attackers' car. Roi Eisenbach, a reserve soldier from the Golani Brigade, went to the sidewalk and shot the car to his right, killing one of the attackers. During the neutralization of one of the perpetrators, Kestelman was shot by one of the soldiers, either Eisenbach or Aviad Freija, after being mistaken for an attacker. Kestelman threw down his gun and got to his knees, and stripped his jacket to show he was not hiding any other weapons. Despite throwing away his gun, kneeling, and raising his hands, he was shot again. Witness testimony alleges that he raised his hands and shouted "I'm Israeli, do not shoot." Freija claims that he did not hear Kestelman talk. Kestelman was hit again with a bullet, and got to his feet to try to gain the troops' attention that he was not a threat. Freija approached and shot him again. Kestelman fell to the ground, and as he collapsed, threw his wallet in the direction of the shooter to show that he was Israeli and not the attacker.

As IDF soldiers assumed he was an attacker, Haaretz stated Kestelman received no medical assistance after being shot. The first emergency responders to arrive at the scene believed he was an attacker and did not come to his aid. He was later evacuated and brought to Shaare Zedek Medical Center where he underwent emergency surgery, but succumbed to his injuries, being pronounced dead in the evening. He was buried the following day, stated in an announcement by his employer.

== Victims ==
Initial reports named the three killed by the attackers as 73-year-old rabbi Elimelech Wasserman, 67-year-old Chana Ifergan, and 24-year-old Livia Dickman. Livia Dickman was pregnant and died at the scene of the attack. The fetus could not be saved. Wasserman and Ifergan were pronounced dead at the Shaare Zedek Medical Center. Six other people were transported to Hadassah Ein Kerem Hospital, of whom three were in serious condition.

A fourth individual Yuval Doron Kestelman was shot and killed by the responding IDF soldiers. Kestelman was a 38-year-old lawyer from Mevaseret Zion who worked for the Civil Service Commission. He was a former soldier in the Israeli security forces.

== Aftermath and reactions ==
Kestelman's family was informed of the shooting in the afternoon, when a police officer called them and informed them that Kestelman's gun, phone, and wallet were in police custody. It was reported by the evening that Kestelman was not one of the attackers, and was shot by Freija despite not being one of the attackers.

Investigating the killing of Yuval Kestelman, at 10:00 a.m., following the attack, journalist Yinon Magal called Freija to speak about the incident. Freija stated "There was a terrorist there, and we shot him", and Magal corrected him and stated that there were two attackers, and not one. Freija was also asked if they had verified the killing, and responded saying "Yes, we shot until they fell", and stated that he did not know if it was his shots that had killed Kestelman or Eisenbach's.

== Investigation ==
The attack was initially only investigated by the Jerusalem District Police, without involvement of the Military Police Investigation Unit. Following public pressure, the MPIU joined the investigation. Eisenbach and Freija, the two soldiers who fired at the scene, were interrogated and Freija was arrested.

After an initial investigation, the Israeli Police confirmed the identities of the attackers as Murad and Ibrahim Nemer, as well as confirming the deaths and injuries. Hamas claimed responsibility for the attack, stating that "The operation came as a natural response to unprecedented crimes conducted by the Occupation".

The police conducted raids on the attacker's family's homes, arresting 6 members of their family. The highway on which the attack took place, Highway 1 at the Motsa Junction, was closed immediately afterwards. The US Ambassador to Israel, Jack Lew, and the EU Ambassador to Israel Dimiter Tzantchev, both condemned the attack on social Kestelman, the bystander who was mistakenly shot by IDF soldiers, labeled his death as an "execution" and called for a thorough investigation. The IDF, initially stating that it had no plans to investigate the incident, later decided to involve its Military Police's investigatory unit following an initial probe by the Shin Bet and Israel Police. Police acknowledged the mistaken identification and expressed sorrow for Kestelman's death.

=== Autopsy ===
Police had initially released Kestelman's body for burial before performing an autopsy, with justification being that the bullets had passed through Kestelman's body and were not visible on a CT scan. The officers assigned to the case did not speak to the doctors who operated on Kestelman when he initially arrived in a deteriorated condition at the hospital. They called the hospital security officer, who stated that if there were shrapnel or bullets found in Kestelman's body, the police would be informed. However, Channel 13 revealed that the CT scan report from the hospital indeed did find metallic remnants of bullet fragments in Kestelman's chest and head, and recommended that Kestelman's body be exhumed for an autopsy.

The MAG Corps presented the developments from the scan to Kestelman's family, and offered to exhume the body and perform a full autopsy expediently. They also offered to have a representative from the National Center for Forensic Medicine view the body, which would help give crucial insight into the investigation. The family agreed to the terms and the body was transferred to the Institute of Forensic Medicine. On December 10, an autopsy was performed, showing that an M16 rifle bullet and other bullet fragments were found, contrary to the claim in court that freed Freija from custody and placed him under house arrest.

Two weeks after the shooting, it was revealed that the investigators from the police forensics department who had examined Kestelman's jacket found no gunshot wounds in it. They concluded that the fatal shooting was carried out only after he took off his coat and got down on his knees. The finding was forwarded to the military police investigative unit before the autopsy was released.

=== Police conduct ===
The police commissioner ordered a senior commissioner to examine the autopsy results and the conduct of the investigation. State attorney Amit Eiseman instructed the Police Investigation Department to open an investigation into the conduct of the police detective team, and blocked the conduction of an independent police investigation.

=== Court martial ===
On the morning of December 5 at a hearing, the presiding judge, Lieutenant Colonel Toby Hart, ruled that "the suspect [Freija] fired unlawfully, not out of operational necessity, but out of frivolity regarding the possilibility of someone's death who no longer posed any danger", and added that no bullets were found in the body of the deceased according to police accounts (that would later be corrected), and that no autopsy had been conducted. He further stated "it is highly doubtful whether it will be possible to determine beyond a reasonable doubt at what stage the brain was injured and what injuries would have led to his eventual death." That evening, the court place Freija on house arrest. In the morning on December 7, Freija and Eisenbach each performed their own re-enactment at the scene in front of the military police investigators.

== Public reaction ==
Following the incident, videos of Kestelman were posted across news websites and social media, which led to intense public debate. Topics raised in the discourse included rules of engagement, extrajudicial executions, medical assistance to wounded attackers, and a policy of distributing weapons to civilians. Moshe Kestelman, Yuval's father, said, "They just executed him," and demanded an indictment against Freija.

=== Rules of engagement ===
Israel has rules of engagement, which is a procedural law that defines when firearms carriers, especially soldiers, may fire their weapons, without receiving direct firing orders, and specifies the steps to be taken before opening fire. The rules are subject to criticism from various groups in Israel, especially in light of terrorist attacks and in relation to terrorists. Various sources claimed that those who carried out an attack should be shot to death, even if they did not pose an immediate danger.

Many prominent voices of commentary of the shooting, including one editorial in Haaretz, criticized the campaign to encourage execution of attackers on the ground, regardless of the risk they pose, claiming it led directly to Kestelman's killing. Professor Mordechai Kremnitzer similarly criticized the campaign for executions at the scene of an attack, arguing that in a state of law, the authority to kill a person as punishment does not lie with soldiers or civilians. IDF Chief of Staff Herzi Halevi addressed the incident, saying: "We commend the heroism of a civilian who ran bravely into the fire to stop the killing of civilians", adding: "Do not rush to fire when the risk decreases, and we do not shoot those who raise their hands."

=== Weapons distribution policy to civilians ===
As a part of public discourse, it was argued that the policy of expanding the distribution of weapons to civilians, which has significantly increased since the October 7 surprise attack, could cause similar casualty incidents. In response to a question from journalists about the "trigger-happy" hand of Freija and public executions by soldiers, Prime Minister Benjamin Netanyahu addressed the latter, saying: "This is the policy and there are costs – this is life." Netanyahu's remarks caused a storm in the news and on social media. The head of the National Unity coalition Benny Gantz responded to Netanyahu's remarks, stating: "This is not life", and said that the incident requires lessons to be learned. Netanyahu later called Kestelman's father, saying that Yuval's death was a terrible tragedy, and that he was a hero of Israel. He also said an investigation would be conducted and those found responsible would be prosecuted.

== See also ==
- 2022 Jerusalem bombings, an attack at the same bus stop a year previously
- Timeline of the Israeli–Palestinian conflict in 2023
- Killing of Alon Shamriz, Yotam Haim, and Samer Talalka, friendly fire on Israeli hostages
- 2024 Kiryat Malakhi attack
- Killing of Naheda and Samr Anton
