= Timeline of the Israeli–Palestinian conflict in 2023 =

- Timeline of the Israeli–Palestinian conflict
- 2022; 2023; 2024

The following is a list of events during the Israeli–Palestinian conflict in 2023, including the 2023 events of the Gaza war.

== January ==
=== 1 January ===
Israeli and Palestinian deaths preceding the 2023 Gaza war. Of the Palestinian deaths 5,360 were in Gaza, 1,007 in the West Bank, 37 in Israel. Most were civilians on both sides.

Rocket attacks fired at Israel from the Gaza Strip, 2001–2021.

Following the United Nations General Assembly's adoption of a resolution to seek an International Court of Justice opinion on Israel's "prolonged occupation, settlement and annexation of the Palestinian territory occupied since 1967", newly elected Israeli far-right lawmaker Zvika Fogel was asked whether the occupation in the West Bank is permanent. He said he "cannot argue with the facts. As of right now, the occupation is permanent. And as of right now I would like to continue to apply Israeli sovereignty over all the areas that I can." Earlier, incoming prime minister Benjamin Netanyahu called the referral "despicable" and said "The Jewish people are not occupiers in their own land nor occupiers in our eternal capital Jerusalem and no U.N. resolution can distort that historical truth". To the concern of the US administration, Netanyahu has made agreements with coalition partners to expand Israeli settlements and legalize dozens of Israeli outposts.

=== 2 January ===
Israeli forces killed two Palestinians, 22 and 25 years old, in a demolition raid on Kafr Dan, northwest of Jenin. The military said "a violent riot was instigated" when they entered the village, and they were attacked with gunfire, rocks and firebombs. The raid was to demolish the homes of two Palestinians killed on 14 September 2022 during an attack that killed an Israeli soldier. Hamas said one of the Palestinians as a member. Human rights groups see such demolitions as "collective punishment".

The new Israeli government told the Israeli High Court that the state would reverse its previous position that Israeli settlers leave Homesh, a yeshiva built on private Palestinian property, and that the government intends to change the Disengagement Law. The Palestinian landowners appealed to the court because they have been prevented from reaching their property due to settlers in the Israeli outpost blocking access. The State Attorney's Office said "the political echelon wishes to announce that, in accordance with the coalition agreements that were signed, it intends to act as soon as possible to amend the guidelines permitting Israelis to remain" and requested a further three months to submit another opinion.

The IDF changed the guidelines for opening fire against Palestinian stone-throwers so that shooting will only be carried out in life-threatening situations, when there is no alternative. The previous guideline from November 2021, allowed firing on "suspects who hurl Molotov cocktails or rocks, even after the deadly object is no longer in their hands."

=== 3 January ===
Israeli forces killed a 15-year-old Palestinian during a raid on Dheisheh refugee camp, south of Bethlehem. Israeli media reported that the military said that they fired at Palestinians throwing Molotov cocktails.

The US, the EU, the UK, France, Turkey, Saudi Arabia, Jordan and the UAE all condemned a visit to the Temple Mount/Al-Aqsa compound by National Security Minister Itamar Ben-Gvir, citing the need to maintain the status quo and avoid increasing tension.

A rocket was fired towards southern Israel. Reports indicate the rocket failed to reach Israeli territory and exploded in Gaza. The rocket fire came after Itamar Ben-Gvir's visit to the Temple Mount/Al-Aqsa compound, which Hamas had warned would be a "detonator".

=== 4 January ===
Israeli forces killed a 16-year-old Palestinian during an arrest raid on Balata refugee camp. The military said that Border Police fired in response to the throwing of Molotov cocktails, explosive devices and stones.

In response to Israel's High Court earlier decision to grant the government 90 days to explain its decision to reverse course on Homesh, the US said that "The Homesh outpost in the West Bank is illegal. It is illegal even under Israeli Law. Our call to refrain from unilateral steps certainly includes any decision to create a new settlement, to legalize outposts or allowing building of any kind deep in the West Bank, adjacent to Palestinian communities or on private Palestinian land."

=== 5 January ===
A UNSC meeting emphasized the need to maintain the status quo at Al Aqsa Mosque/Temple Mount following the visit there by Itamar Ben-Gvir but took no further action. Jordan, which called for the meeting, summoned the Israeli ambassador over the issue. The US deputy UN ambassador, Robert Wood, told the council "We note that Prime Minister Netanyahu's governing platform calls for preservation of the status quo with relation to the holy places. We expect the government of Israel to follow through on that commitment."

Israeli forces killed a 16-year-old Palestinian in Nablus during an arrest raid in Balata Refugee Camp. The Israeli police stated that armed Palestinians had fired on military, police, and intelligence personnel carrying out the raid and that they had shot "an armed person, who fired at the forces from close range". Local media sources shared surveillance footage with Al Jazeera of him walking and running before getting killed, but Al Jazeera could not independently verify the footage.

=== 6 January ===
Israel approved a series of measures following the Palestinian request that the UN seek an ICJ opinion about Israel's occupation. The measures include the freezing of Palestinian construction plans in Area C, offsetting Palestinian tax revenues and "action against organizations that promote hostile activity, including political-legal activity against Israel under the guise of humanitarian activity." Palestine condemned the moves.

=== 11 January ===
According to Palestinian state media, a 21-year-old Palestinian succumbed to wounds sustained earlier during an Israeli raid on Balata refugee camp.

Palestinians in occupied East Jerusalem raised Palestinian flags in response to a decision on 8 January by Ben-Gvir, who ordered Israeli police to remove Palestinian flags from public spaces and said the Palestine Liberation Organisation was a terrorist organisation. Ben-Gvir also compared the flag to a Nazi symbol on Twitter. Amnesty International said the Israeli restrictions against flying the flag were "a shameless attempt to legitimise racism".

A 19-year-old Palestinian was killed by an armed Israeli civilian at the illegal outpost of Havat Yehuda (Yehuda farm) in the South Hebron Hills. The Palestinian stabbed the 25-year-old Israeli owner of the illegal farm in the head, moderately wounding him. According to the owner's wife, the assailant was then shot and killed by another Israeli man who had come to repair an electrical problem and witnessed the attack.

=== 12 January ===
- [Conflicting accounts] Israeli forces killed a 41-year-old Palestinian during a raid on the Qalandia refugee camp. According to Al Jazeera he "was shot by an Israeli sniper while standing with other family members on the roof of their home watching the raid", his son having been arrested 10 minutes earlier while Haaretz reported that the man was shot while trying to prevent the arrest of his son. The military said that during the raid "suspects threw stones and cement blocks from the roofs of the houses at the forces in a way that endangered the lives of the fighters, who responded by dispersing demonstrations and shooting" and that "an injury was detected", but did not confirm the death.
- Israeli forces conducted a raid in Qabatiya to capture an individual wanted by Israeli authorities for alleged participation in terror activities and for planning future attacks. As the suspect and a second individual fled arrest, Israeli forces opened fire, with the second suspect hit by the bullets. According to the Palestinian Health Ministry, a 25 year old Palestinian man was shot in the head during clashes in the area. An 18-year-old Palestinian who was critically wounded at the time later died from his wounds. It was not clear if the two dead were involved in the gunfire, the violent riots, or if one was the second suspect.
- The IDF said it had killed three Palestinians and injured another after they had infiltrated the illegal Jewish settlement of Adora in the West Bank and opened fire at its soldiers.

=== 13 January ===
- Israeli forces killed two Palestinians, a 23 and a 24-year-old, during a raid on Jaba, south of Jenin. The military said its soldiers opened fire after gunmen in a passing vehicle shot at them. Militant group Islamic Jihad said both of them as members of the group and described them as "heroic martyrs" who tried to intervene during the raid.
- According to Palestinian state media, a 19-year-old Palestinian shot by Israeli soldiers in Kufr Dan on 2 January succumbed to his wounds raising the number of Palestinians killed to 12 in 2023.

=== 15 January ===
[conflicting reports] A 45-year-old Palestinian was killed by Israeli forces. According to Al Jazeera, citing Palestinian media, the man was reportedly told to get out of his car and argued with soldiers before being shot whereas Israeli media reported that, according to the Israeli military, the man had a knife and had been shot after approaching a soldier's post and pulling out a knife. A later report by the Independent/AP, states "The Israeli military said soldiers spotted a vehicle they considered suspicious which refused to stop for inspection near the West Bank town of Silwad. A clash broke out when the soldiers attempted to detain one of the people in the vehicle, and soldiers opened fire when one of the vehicle's passengers tried to grab a soldier's weapon." According to the New Arab, "The man's son, Qusai Kahla, told AFP he was in the car with his father when they were stopped at the checkpoint and said "Soldiers came and they sprayed pepper spray on my face and pulled me out of the car, I don't know what happened after that, I found out from my uncle that my dad was killed." Subsequently, the Israeli army changed its explanation, Having initially said that a man in a car threw stones and then approached soldiers with a knife, it is now said that soldiers called for the man to stop and used tear gas when he refused. Then the man refused to get out of his car, there was a confrontation, that he tried to steal a weapon from a soldier and was shot. On 23 January, the Times of Israel reported that the military launched an investigation after concluding that the Palestinian was unnecessarily shot dead and not a terrorist as originally reported.

=== 16 January ===
The Palestinian Ministry of health said that Israeli forces killed a 14-year-old Palestinian during a raid on the Dheisheh Refugee camp. The Israeli army said that it was in response to rocks, Molotov cocktails and improvised explosive devices thrown at them. Palestinian Prisoner's Society reported that soldiers searched for a Palestinian Journalist and entered the homes of his mother, finding a 50-year-old Italian woman activist accompanied her mother. The Italian women was arrested with not clear reason and later was returned to Italy.

Hamas released an undated video allegedly of Israeli hostage Avera Mengistu. No confirmed footage of Mengistu has been released since he was detained in September 2014. A brother of Mengistu's was unable to confirm whether or not the person in the video was his brother Avera, although he did not believe it was him.The Prime Minister's Office released a statement maintaining that "the State of Israel invests all its resources and efforts to return its missing sons held captive to their home".

The United Nations Office for the Coordination of Humanitarian Affairs (OCHA) issued the Protection of Civilians Report covering the period 20 December 2022 – 9 January 2023. During the reporting period, 5 Palestinians were killed by Israeli forces (4 year to date) and 0 Israelis were killed by Palestinians. There were 202 Israeli military search and arrest operations in the West Bank (101 year to date), and 69 Palestinian-owned structures were demolished (33 year to date).

=== 17 January ===
More than 90 UN member states condemned and issued statements calling for the reversal of punitive measures of the recently imposed sanctions on Palestine Authority. Many of the member states had voted against or abstained on a recent UNGA resolution calling for an ICJ advisory opinion on the occupation.

Israeli forces killed a 40-year-old Palestinian at Halhul near Hebron. Israeli forces said the man shot at soldiers operating a checkpoint. The man left a will saying he decided to "sacrifice his life to protect holy sites and the honor of Islam and Muslims".

=== 18 January ===
At a UNSC meeting, the recent sanctions imposed by Israel on the Palestinian Authority, were discussed. US ambassador Linda Thomas-Greenfield stated that the US will "continue to oppose unilateral actions that endanger the stability and the viability of a two states solution...this includes actions to the historic status quo at the Haram al-Sharif/Temple Mount, this includes settlement building and the legalization of outposts, and this includes, annexation, acts of terrorism, and incitement."

=== 19 January ===
The Palestinian Ministry of Health stated that overnight raid on Jenin Camp killed a 57-year-old teacher and a 28-year-old armed Jenin Brigades senior member. Israeli military stated that "hits were identified" and a soldier was wounded by an explosive device. Around four Palestinians were wounded and six Palestinians were allegedly arrested, including two sons of the Palestinian Islamic Jihad leader.

=== 21 January ===
The IDF stated that a 42-year-old Palestinian was shot dead due to the person attempting to stab an armed Israeli civilian at the illegal Sde Ephraim farm outpost near the town of Kafr Ni'ma. CCTV footage and photographs of the scene showed that the alleged attacker attempted to stab using a screwdriver but was killed. Palestinian Islamic Jihad claimed the deceased as a member.

=== 25 January ===
Israeli forces said that a 20-year-old Palestinian was shot dead after an attempt to stab a soldier near the Israeli settlement of Kedumim. Later, Israel army released a CCTV video that showed a man getting out of a car and running towards the soldiers with an object in his hand.

Law enforcement officials stated that a 17-year-old Palestinian carrying a fake gun was shot dead during a raid on Shu'fat camp in East Jerusalem.

=== 26 January ===
During a raid on the Jenin refugee camp, nine Palestinians including a 60-year-old woman were killed. Israel's military said that it was response to intelligence about imminent attacks by the Islamic Jihad against Israelis. The death toll rose to 10, after a 22-year-old Palestinian in Al-Ram was shot during confrontations between Israeli forces and people protesting the killing of nine Palestinians.

The IDF stated that two rockets were intercepted by the Iron Dome system from the Gaza Strip towards southern Israel and no casualties or damages were reported. The Rocket launch was stated to be a response to killing of nine Palestinians, and Israel activated rocket sirens in Ashkelon, Zikim and Karmia.

=== 27 January ===
The Israeli military announced that it had targeted Palestinian militant group's training sites after 10 or more rockets were launched from the Gaza Strip; according to the military, four were intercepted, three fell in open areas, and several inside Gaza. According to witnesses and local media, Israeli drones launched at least 13 missiles strikes that had hit al-Maghazi refugee camp in the central Gaza Strip. Around 2 missiles strikes hit from Israeli drone prelude to larger airstrikes carried out by fighter jets.

Seven Israelis were killed and three wounded in a shooting attack in Neve Yaakov, East Jerusalem. According to the Israeli police, the gunman, a 21-year-old Palestinian, was shot and killed. A Hamas spokesperson said that the shooting was "a natural response" for the earlier raid on Jenin.

A 16-year-old Palestinian succumbed to wounds from Israeli gunfire during clashes in Silwan on 25 January. The Israeli police said he was one of a pair of teenagers shot after throwing firebombs and fireworks at officers.

=== 28 January ===
Two people, a 22-year-old off-duty IDF officer and his 45-year-old father were seriously injured in a shooting attack in Silwan, East Jerusalem. The shooter, reportedly a 13-year-old resident of East Jerusalem, was shot by two civilians who had licensed weapons and is now being held and treated. An IDF soldier was also lightly injured in the incident. The US Department of Defense condemned the shooting, while Hamas welcomed the attack, describing it as a confirmation of resistance action in all the occupied territories.

=== 29 January ===
An 18-year-old Palestinian was killed near Kedumim. The Israeli military said the man was armed with a handgun and killed by a settlement security team. WAFA reported that the circumstances were unclear.

=== 30 January ===
Israeli forces killed a 26-year-old Palestinian man in Hebron. The Israeli military said the man had driven his car into a soldier at a checkpoint and then troops fired at the vehicle as it attempted to flee but did not say it was a deliberate attack and that the incident would be further investigated.

== February ==
=== 3 February ===
Israeli forces killed an unarmed 26-year-old Palestinian near Nablus. The military said the man ran towards soldiers, who ordered him to stop and when he failed to do so was shot. An Israeli military source said a suicide note was found on the body.

The United Nations Office for the Coordination of Humanitarian Affairs (OCHA) issued the Protection of Civilians Report covering the period 10–30 January 2023. During the reporting period, 31 Palestinians (35 year to date) were killed by Israeli forces, 7 Israelis (including 1 foreigner) (7 year to date) were killed by Palestinians. There were 233 Israeli military search and arrest operations in the West Bank (340 year to date), and 91 Palestinian-owned structures were demolished (131 year to date).

=== 6 February ===
Israeli forces killed five Palestinians in a gunfight with Israeli forces in the Aqbat Jabr refugee camp near Jericho. The military said that soldiers were attempting to arrest gunmen accused of an attempted attack the previous week at a nearby Israeli settlement, since when the town had been under a semi-blockade. The Israeli military claims that the individuals targeted in the operation were linked to Hamas. While Hamas did not confirm the connection, they praised the actions of the targeted individuals and acknowledged having an active cell in the area.

=== 7 February ===
Israel froze a planned demolition in Wadi Quddum, an area of Silwan in East Jerusalem, that would have left 11 families and 100 residents homeless. The Prime Minister's office requested the delay but the demolition order remains in force. Human rights organizations and diplomats applied pressure to prevent the move and US Secretary of State Antony Blinken recently requested Israel to cease home demolitions. New National Security Minister Itamar Ben Gvir insists the authorities demolish East Jerusalem homes built without permits that are virtually impossible to obtain.

A 17-year-old Palestinian was killed by Israeli forces during clashes East of Nablus. The military said he was a gunman who had fired on troops. The Lions' Den group said he was from the Askar refugee camp near Nablus but did not claim him as a member.

=== 9 February ===
Israeli forces killed a 22-year-old Palestinian at the entrance to the al-Fawwar refugee camp near Hebron. The military said that he tried to stab a soldier.

=== 10 February ===
A suspected car-ramming attack occurred at the entrance of the Ramot settlement in East Jerusalem, killing two people and injuring at least five others. The fatalities included a 6-year-old boy and a man in his 20s. Subsequently, an 8-year-old child injured in the attack succumbed to his wounds. The driver, a 31-year-old Palestinian citizen of Israel, father of three and resident of Isawiya, was shot dead at the scene. According to the driver's family, he was released from a psychiatric ward the day before. Israeli security officials said the family statement was credible. One relative said "I'm sorry for what happened. It's a tragedy, but it's not a terror attack". The attacker lived in rented accommodation so the Israeli authorities sealed his family's home prior to a potential demolition. Such sealing and demolition has long been Israeli policy but is considered illegal as collective punishment in international law. Subsequently, Shin Bet concluded that the residence should not be demolished and should not have been sealed not least because the attacker was psychologically unstable.

=== 11 February ===
An Israeli settler killed a 27-year-old Palestinian in Qarawat Bani Hassan village. According to the IDF, an initial investigation said a confrontation occurred between settlers and Palestinians near the Havat Yair outpost and that one of the settlers opened fire after a stone hit another Israeli in the head. The Jerusalem Post reported that the settlers said the shooting occurred after one of them was injured by fireworks that were fired at them by Palestinians. Calling for an investigation, the US Office of Palestinian Affairs tweeted "We strongly condemn the shooting of Methkal Rayyan by an Israeli settler from the illegal Havat Yair outpost in Salfit".

The Israeli military reported that a single rocket launched from the Gaza Strip towards southern Israel was successfully intercepted by the Iron Dome air defense system. Rocket sirens were heard in the town of Kibbutz Nahal Oz, causing alarm among local residents. There were no reports of any casualties or damage caused by the attack.

=== 12 February ===
Israeli forces killed a 14-year-old Palestinian during an arrest raid on Jenin. Two others were seriously wounded. According to the Israeli military, forces conducted the raid to detain a suspected militant and had come under fire.

Israel approved the legalization of nine illegal settler outposts. A US spokesman said "We strongly oppose expansion of settlements, and we're deeply concerned by reports about a process to legalize outposts that are illegal under Israeli law. We are seeking more information from the Israeli government on what has actually been decided." The Palestinian Authority condemned the decision as crossing "all red lines".

=== 13 February ===
Israeli aircraft conducted a series of airstrikes in the Gaza Strip. No casualties were reported. The military said the strikes were in response to a rocket firing and that it had struck "an underground complex containing raw materials used for the manufacturing of rockets."

Israeli forces killed a 21-year-old Palestinian during an arrest raid in Nablus.

UN experts said "The international community must take action to stop systematic and deliberate housing demolition and sealing, arbitrary displacement and forced evictions of Palestinian people in the occupied West Bank".

A 17-year-old Israeli was lightly injured after being stabbed in the back in the Old City of Jerusalem. The attacker, a 14-year-old Palestinian from the Shuafat refugee camp in East Jerusalem fled the scene before being apprehended on the Temple Mount. The incident has been classified as a terror attack by law enforcement.

While a 22-year-old Israeli border officer was questioning a 13-year-old Palestinian on a bus at the checkpoint near the entrance of the Shuafat refugee camp, the boy stabbed the officer. The police said that an Israeli civilian security guard at the scene shot at the attacker and accidentally hit the officer, who later died of his wounds. The boy was arrested and subsequently charged with murder "under the aggravated circumstances of an act of terrorism".

=== 14 February ===
After being shot by Israeli forces during a raid on Far'a refugee camp, a 17-year-old Palestinian later succumbed to his wounds. The army said it had shot a person holding an explosive device. It was unclear whether the victim was involved.

A 25-year-old Palestinian succumbed to Israeli army gunshot wounds he sustained on 1 January 2021 in an incident at Masafer Yatta. The shooting caused international controversy at the time.

An Israeli soldier who assaulted a well known Palestinian human rights activist, Issa Amro, was given a 10-day sentence by the military. The incident was caught on video taken by a reporter from the New Yorker who was interviewing the victim at the time. The Israeli military account of events differs from that of the New Yorker reporter, Lawrence Wright. In November 2022, the IDF declared a closed military zone around Amro's home following his complaints of settlers targeting him.

=== 16 February ===
According to Peace Now, 38% of the area of the illegal West Bank outposts that the Israeli cabinet authorized on 12 February have an undetermined status. Since the authorization, which included the single biggest settlement announcement ever made, it has been criticized in a joint statement by France, Germany, Italy the United Kingdom and the US. The UNSC is considering a draft resolution requiring Israel "immediately and completely cease all settlement activities in the occupied Palestinian territory."

=== 20 February ===
At a UNSC meeting, the Council issued a formal statement condemning Israel's plan for settlement expansion on Palestinian territory. It was the first action the United States has permitted against Israel in six years. The statement said "The Security Council reiterates that continuing Israeli settlement activities are dangerously imperiling the viability of the two-State solution based on the 1967 lines" and "The Security Council expresses deep concern and dismay with Israel's announcement on February 12." The UAE did not push a draft resolution to a vote "given the positive talks between the parties." Netanyahu's office condemned the formal statement saying "The statement should not have been made and the United States should not have joined it."

Israeli Prime Minister Benjamin Netanyahu's office said no new settlements will be authorized in the coming months.

A 16-year-old Palestinian shot during an Israeli raid on Nablus on 8 February succumbed to his wounds.

=== 21 February ===
OCHA issued the Protection of Civilians Report covering the period 31 January – 13 February 2023. During the reporting period, 10 Palestinians (44 year to date) were killed by Israeli forces, 4 Israelis (including 1 foreigner) (11 year to date) were killed by Palestinians. There were 160 Israeli military search and arrest operations in the West Bank (520 year to date), and 35 Palestinian-owned structures were demolished (168 year to date including 50 in East Jerusalem).

=== 22 February ===
The Palestinian Health ministry said that during an incursion into Nablus, Israeli forces killed 11 Palestinians including a 72-year-old, while more than 102 were wounded, many by live fire, some critically. Two of the dead are said to be the subject of the arrest operation and killed following the Israeli forces demolition of a building they were occupying.

=== 23 February ===
Finance Minister Bezalel Smotrich takes charge of most of the Civil Administration, obtaining broad authority over civilian issues in the West Bank. Israeli peace groups condemned the move as de jure annexation of occupied territories. Rights lawyer Michael Sfard tweeted that the action "entails de jure annexation of the West Bank".

Israeli forces said that six rockets were fired at Israel from Gaza, five of which were intercepted by Iron Dome and the last fell in an uninhabited area. In response, Israeli airstrikes were made on several targets in northern and central Gaza.

The Palestinian Health Ministry said that a 30-year-old Palestinian in a raid on Jenin two weeks earlier succumbed to his wounds.

=== 24 February ===
A 22-year-old Palestinian shot by Israeli forces on 23 February during a confrontation at the Arroub refugee camp north of Hebron, succumbed to his wounds.

=== 26 February ===
A Palestinian gunman killed two Israeli settlers, a 20 and 22-year-old, reportedly from the illegal settlement of Har Bracha, near Huwara. The gunman shot them in their car on Highway 60 and they died en route to hospital. Hours later, settlers went to Huwara to "seek revenge".

The settler rampage, likened to a pogrom, affected many townships and villages across the West Bank, and led to the destruction by arson of over 100 cars, and 35 homes, with a further 40 others partially damaged, with Palestinian agricultural lands also torched. A 37-year-old Palestinian was killed during settler rioting in the town of Za'tara, south of Huwara.

Israel and Palestinian officials meeting for the first time in years in Aqaba, Jordan, said they would work closely to prevent "further violence" and "reaffirmed the necessity of committing to de-escalation on the ground". In a statement, the parties "confirmed their joint readiness and commitment to immediately work to end unilateral measures for a period of 3–6 months. This includes an Israeli commitment to stop discussion of any new settlement units for four months and to stop authorisation of any outposts for six months". The Israeli side would not reverse its earlier decision to legalize nine outposts or its plans to build thousands of additional housing units. The sides agreed to meet again in Sharm el-Sheikh, Egypt, in March.

=== 27 February ===
Israeli Prime Minister Benjamin Netanyahu denied any agreement to freeze settlement construction even though Washington had earlier announced the agreement at Aqaba.

A 27-year-old Israeli–American was killed in a shooting attack that took place in various locations in the West Bank near the Dead Sea. The assailants, who arrived by car, shot at two Israeli vehicles and then fled towards Jericho. No injuries were reported in the second shooting. Palestinians say that the Israeli military is conducting searches in the Aqabat Jabr refugee camp and is blocking Jericho's entrances.

The US State Department published its 2021 report on terrorism. After noting that "multiple sources reported a substantial rise in such attacks during 2021", it concluded that "Israeli security personnel often did not prevent settler attacks and rarely detained or charged perpetrators of settler violence".

== March ==
=== 1 March ===
Israeli forces raided the Aqabat Jaber refugee camp, killed one Palestinian and arrested three others suspected of involvement in the killing of an American-Israeli on 27 February.

Israeli Attorney General Gali Baharav-Miara opened an investigation into lawmaker Zvika Fogel of the far-right Otzma Yehudit party and a member of the Israeli government coalition on "suspicion of incitement to terrorism". Fogel had publicly supported the Huwara settler rampage. 22 Israeli legal experts wrote to the attorney general to investigate pro-settler government MKs, including far-right minister Bezalel Smotrich, for "inducing war crimes" by their public support for the riots. Going further, Smotrich, when asked why he liked a tweet by Samaria Regional Council deputy mayor Davidi Ben Zion calling "to wipe out the village of Huwara today", said "Because I think the village of Huwara needs to be wiped out. I think the State of Israel should do it."

=== 2 March ===
Israeli forces killed a 15-year-old Palestinian and wounded another in Azzun near Qalqilya. Palestinian media reported that the pair threw stones at soldiers. The Israeli military said soldiers shot at suspects who had hurled explosives at forces.

=== 4 March ===
OCHA issued the Protection of Civilians Report covering the period 14–27 February 2023. During the reporting period, 15 Palestinians (59 year to date) were killed by Israeli forces, 3 Israelis (14 year to date) were killed by Palestinians. There were 175 Israeli military search and arrest operations in the West Bank (701 year to date), and 67 Palestinian-owned structures were demolished (235 year to date including 67 in East Jerusalem).

=== 7 March ===
A gunfight ensued during an Israeli army raid in Jenin, resulting in the death of six Palestinians and the injury of 26 others. The military said they entered Jenin to arrest suspects involved in the killing of two Israelis in Huwara on 26 February and that one of the dead was the suspected perpetrator, identified by Israeli military as a 49-year-old Hamas militant. The Jenin brigade stated that its militants shot and threw explosive devices at Israeli soldiers. Palestinian President Mahmoud Abbas' spokesperson denounced the Israeli military's actions, calling it a full-scale war against Palestinians and derailing recent efforts to restore calm.

=== 9 March ===
Israeli forces raided Jaba', south of Jenin, killing three Islamic Jihad members inside a car. The military said they were fired at from the car. A 14-year-old Palestinian succumbed to wounds received after he was shot by Israeli forces during the 7 March raid on Jenin. Of 74 Palestinians killed in Israeli raids since the start of 2023, around half were affiliated with militant groups.

Three people were shot and wounded in a suspected terror attack in Tel Aviv after a gunman opened fire on people sitting outside a café. One of the wounded was taken to the hospital in a critical state and the others in serious and moderate conditions. The gunman, later identified as a 23-year-old Palestinian from Ni'lin in the West Bank, who did not have an entry permit to Israel, was shot and killed by police officers and two civilians shortly after the shooting. Two Israeli Arabs suspected of driving Palestinians without work permits into Israeli territory handed themselves in and were arrested. Hamas said the Palestinian was a member of its military wing and his father and brother were also subsequently arrested.

=== 10 March ===
A 21-year-old Palestinian man from Saniriya was shot and killed by an Israeli settler near the settlement of Karnei Shomron near Qalqilya. The Israeli military said that the Palestinian, armed with knives and explosive devices, had entered a farm with the intention of carrying out an attack. He allegedly threw two explosive devices before being killed. He was not known to have any relations with militant groups.

Israeli forces killed a 16-year-old Palestinian during confrontations near Qalqilya. According to the military the youth threw a Molotov cocktail at an army post "from a close range."

=== 12 March ===
Israeli forces killed three Palestinian gunmen at a checkpoint near Nablus. Four Palestinians were traveling in a car. The military said that "gunmen opened fire" at an army position. 1 Palestinian turned himself in and was arrested.

=== 16 March ===
Israeli forces killed four Palestinians during a raid on Jenin. Two of the dead were claimed by Palestinian sources as a senior member of Hamas and another of Islamic Jihad. A third was a 16-year-old boy and the identity of the fourth is not currently known. The boy was shot in the head while lying motionless and face down on the ground. Breaking the Silence called the shooting an "extrajudicial execution" and the European Union demanded an immediate transparent investigation into the killing. A subsequent investigation and 3D reconstruction published in May by the Washington Post concluded that Israeli forces killed the boy, that he was one of least 16 civilians in the area as Israeli forces fired more than 20 shots that killed the two militants, neither of whom appeared to be armed, subsequently shooting one of the militants multiple times after he was incapacitated in an apparent extrajudicial execution.

=== 17 March ===
Israeli forces killed a 23-year-old Palestinian man near Ramallah. The military said the Palestinian approached soldiers and pulled a knife.

=== 18 March ===
Palestinian militants fired a rocket from Gaza into southern Israel. The rocket landed in an open area in the southern Israeli city of Sderot and didn't cause any injury.

=== 19 March ===
An Itamar settler was shot and seriously wounded while driving with his family through Huwaara in the West Bank. The gunman, a Palestinian from the nearby village of Madama was later arrested. Hamas and Islamic Jihad spokespersons stated that the incident was a 'natural response' to the occupation.

A 64-year-old Israeli man was lightly injured after his vehicle was shot at and had stones thrown at while he drove at the Doar Junction near the West Bank village of Ras Karkar.

Following the earlier Aqaba summit, the parties convened again at Sharm el-Sheikh. Israel reiterated a commitment to freeze talks about establishing new West Bank settlements for four months and to halt the authorization of outposts for a period of six months. The parties agreed to meet again in April.

A 32-year-old Israeli man succumbed to wounds he sustained in a shooting attack in Tel Aviv eleven days prior.

Israel's Finance Minister Bezalel Smotrich, whilst speaking in Paris, openly denied the existence of the Palestinian ethnic group, claiming that they are 'an invention' of the past century. The US issued a rebuke and the EU called on Israel to disavow the comments. As well as condemning the comments, Jordan summoned the Israeli ambassador because Smotrich used a map portraying Jordan as part of the Jewish state's territory, during his talk.

OCHA issued the Protection of Civilians Report covering the period 28 February – 13 March 2023. During the reporting period, 16 Palestinians (75 year to date) were killed by Israeli forces, 0 Israelis (14 year to date) were killed by Palestinians. There were 124 Israeli military search and arrest operations in the West Bank (857 year to date), and 38 Palestinian-owned structures were demolished (273 year to date including 75 in East Jerusalem).

=== 20 March ===
The US State Department issued its 2022 report on human rights confirming that this area continues to be a problem for Israel. Significant human rights issues include credible reports of unlawful or arbitrary killings.

=== 21 March ===
Israel repealed a 2005 law whereby four Israeli settlements, Homesh, Sa-Nur, Ganim and Kadim, were dismantled as part of the Israeli disengagement from Gaza. The move was condemned by the PA and the EU, the latter calling for the revocation of the new law. Critics, including some of the Israeli opposition and NGOs supporting Palestinian rights, denounced the move as a prelude to annexation of the West Bank. The US, in addition to denouncing the move, also summoned the Israeli ambassador to express concern.

=== 23 March ===
Israeli forces killed Amir Abu Khadija, a 25-year-old Palestinian, during an arrest raid targeting Khadija in Tulkarm. The Tulkarm branch of Fatah's armed group Al-Aqsa Martyrs' Brigades claimed Khadija as its leader. Israeli police stated that Khadija was wanted for his involvement in several shooting attacks, claiming him as a member of a local militant group. According to the Israeli military, soldiers shot Khadija when he drew a gun. Security forces also arrested another member of the armed group.

A shooting attack was reported near the Israeli settlement of Avnei Hefetz in the West Bank. No Israelis were injured. The gunman was apparently wounded by gunfire and fled the scene. Another shooting attack earlier in the day damaged an Israeli vehicle but caused no injuries.

=== 25 March ===
The Israeli military said that two Israeli soldiers who were securing the Route 60 highway in the town were wounded, one seriously, in a drive-by shooting in Huwara.

=== 31 March ===
OCHA issued the Protection of Civilians Report covering the period 14–27 March 2023. During the reporting period, 6 Palestinians (81 year to date) were killed by Israeli forces, 1 Israeli (14 year to date) was killed by Palestinians. There were 130 Israeli military search and arrest operations in the West Bank (998 year to date), and 5 Palestinian-owned structures were demolished (278 year to date including 79 in East Jerusalem).

== April ==
=== 1 April ===
Israeli police killed a 26-year-old Palestinian near the Chain Gate leading into Al-Aqsa Mosque. The police said the man tried to take a police officer's weapon. Palestinian sources dispute the police account.

Israeli forces killed a 24-year-old Palestinian in his car near Beit Ummar. The military said that the man rammed his car into a group of soldiers wounding three, at least one seriously.

=== 3 April ===
Israeli forces killed 2 Palestinians during a raid on Nablus. The military said they were there to arrest three Palestinians reportedly involved in a shooting in Huwara that injured two Israeli soldiers on 25 March and that they were fired on and returned fire. One of the dead Palestinians was claimed by the Lions' Den group and the other by Fatah.

=== 5 April ===
Clashes erupted after Israeli police entered the Al-Aqsa mosque to eject Palestinians who had barricaded themselves in the mosque overnight to pray. Some 400 Palestinians were arrested. Ten rockets were fired at Israel from Gaza and Israeli forces bombed sites in the strip in response with no casualties reported. The Israeli raid on the mosque was condemned by Palestinians and Arab countries.

=== 6 April ===
Israeli forces carried out a second expulsion raid on the Al-Aqsa Mosque. The United Nations Security Council is to meet in closed session to discuss the situation.

A 19-year-old Israeli soldier was injured in a shooting attack near the Geva Binyamin junction in the West Bank. The gunman fled the scene. The soldier was hospitalized in light-to-moderate condition.

=== 7 April ===
Two Israeli women in their 20s were killed and their 45-year-old mother critically injured in a shooting attack on a car near the settlement of Hamra in the northern West Bank. The women, British citizens who had emigrated to Israel, were residents of the Efrat settlement. The mother died of her wounds on 10 April.

=== 8 April ===
Israeli forces killed a 20-year-old Palestinian man allegedly attempting to detonate an explosive device near Azzun.

=== 10 April ===
Israeli forces killed a 15-year-old Palestinian during a raid on the Aqabat Jabr refugee camp near Jericho.

Two Palestinians and 2 Israeli soldiers were injured during a raid on Al-Ain refugee camp in Nablus.

Thousands of Israeli settlers marched to the illegal outpost of Evyatar, heavily guarded by Israeli forces. The march was accompanied by 20 Knesset members and 7 coalition ministers, including Bezalel Smotrich and Itamar Ben-Gvir. The settlers are demanding that the Israeli government legalize the outpost.

=== 11 April ===
Israeli forces killed two Palestinian men. The army said troops at Deir al-Hatab opened fire at Palestinian gunmen firing from a vehicle at a military post near the adjacent Israeli settlement of Elon Moreh.

=== 17 April ===
A 36-year-old Israeli man was stabbed and moderately injured by a Palestinian woman at the Gush Etzion Junction in the West Bank. The suspected assailant was shot by soldiers and was then hospitalized in unclear condition.

=== 18 April ===
Two Israeli men were shot and wounded in an attack near the Tomb of Simeon the Just in East Jerusalem's Sheikh Jarrah neighborhood. The attacker opened fire on the victims with a makeshift "Carlo" submachine gun while they were in their car and then fled the scene. An extensive manhunt was launched. On 19 April, a 15-year-old Palestinian resident of the Askar refugee camp near Nablus was arrested in suspicion of the attack.

=== 20 April ===
OCHA issued the Protection of Civilians Report covering the period 28 March – 17 April 2023. During the reporting period, 8 Palestinians (89 year to date) were killed by Israeli forces and 3 Israelis (17 year to date) were killed by Palestinians. There were 131 Israeli military search and arrest operations in the West Bank (1165 year to date), and 10 Palestinian-owned structures were demolished (290 year to date including 79 in East Jerusalem). There were 54 attacks on Palestinians by Israeli settlers (314 year to date).

=== 24 April ===
Israeli forces killed a 20-year-old Palestinian during a raid on Aqabat Jaber refugee camp in Jericho, where the army has been blockading the city for three days. Three other Palestinian men were wounded.

A car-ramming attack in West Jerusalem's Davidka Square left five people wounded, including an elderly man in serious condition and a woman in her 30s in moderate condition. The driver, a 39-year-old resident of East Jerusalem, was shot dead by a civilian at the scene. The Times of Israel reported the driver as a father of five from Beit Safafa. He is known to have mental health issues although he was unknown to security forces. Prime Minister Benjamin Netanyahu and Israeli police called the incident a terror attack.

=== 27 April ===
[Accounts are somewhat contradictory] Israeli forces killed a 39-year-old suspected Palestinian assailant that the military alleged tried to ram civilians and security forces at an intersection. Palestinian media said the incident may have been an ordinary collision. In a video, a damaged minivan beside the Palestinian's car has a Palestinian license plate. The video shows an Israeli police officer approaching the driver's seat and the Palestinian apparently lunging at the officer when a nearby soldier "unleashes a torrent of gunfire until [the Palestinian] is reduced to a bloody pulp".

=== 28 April ===
Israeli forces killed a 16-year-old Palestinian during clashes in Tuqu, near Bethlehem. The military said the incident was under review.

== May ==
=== 1 May ===
Israeli forces killed a 17-year-old Palestinian during clashes at Aqabat Jabr refugee camp. WAFA reported that it is the 10th consecutive day with all entrances leading to the city of Jericho subject of intensified Israeli security checks.

=== 2 May ===
Palestinian activist Khader Adnan died in Israeli prison after nearly three months on hunger strike, the first such fatality in 30 years. Three rockets and a mortar shell were fired from Gaza into Israel. The military stated that Israeli tanks retaliated by firing into Gaza, which prompted Hamas and Islamic Jihad to launch a barrage of 22 rockets at Israeli towns situated along the border, activating the IDF's Iron Dome interception system. A construction site in southern Israel incurred shrapnel that resulted in the injury of three foreign nationals, one seriously and two lightly. According to Hamas, a Hamas security position was shelled. The extent of casualties in the Gaza Strip is uncertain.

According to a report by Amnesty International, titled Automated Apartheid, Israel is increasingly relying on facial recognition to track Palestinians and control their movement. The report states "Israeli authorities are using facial recognition technology to entrench apartheid."

=== 3 May ===
Following the death of Khader Adnan militants fired over a hundred rockets into Israel and Israeli warplanes bombed Gaza. A 58-year-old Palestinian was killed as a result of the bombings. A "reciprocal and simultaneous" ceasefire went into effect at 3:30 a.m. (0030 GMT) after mediation from Egyptian, Qatari and United Nations officials.

=== 4 May ===
Israeli forces killed three Palestinians in a raid on Nablus. Hamas confirmed that the Palestinian men were members and that they had carried out a 7 April attack that resulted in the deaths of three British-Israelis.

Israeli forces killed a 26-year-old female Palestinian in Hawara. She was alleged to have carried out a stabbing attack against a soldier who was lightly wounded in the incident.

=== 5 May ===
OCHA issued the Protection of Civilians Report covering the period 18 April – 1 May 2023. During the reporting period, 5 Palestinians (94 year to date) were killed by Israeli forces and 0 Israelis (17 year to date) were killed by Palestinians. There were 110 Israeli military search and arrest operations in the West Bank (1279 year to date), and 2 Palestinian-owned structures were demolished (292 year to date including 80 in East Jerusalem). There were 38 attacks on Palestinians by Israeli settlers (352 year to date).

=== 6 May ===
Israeli forces killed two 22-year-old Palestinian fighters during a raid on Nur al-Shams refugee camp, Tulkarm. The military said the pair were suspected of a shooting attack at a nearby Israeli settlement.

=== 7 May ===
Israel demolished a school in the Palestinian village of Jubbet al-Dhib. The school was funded by the European Union and the EU's delegation to the Palestinians called on Israel to cease demolitions and evictions, saying "Demolitions are illegal under international law, and children's right to education must be respected". OCHA estimates that at least 58 schools in the West Bank (50 in Area C and 8 in East Jerusalem) are subject of demolition or stopwork orders.

=== 9 May ===
Israeli airstrikes in Gaza killed 13 people, including three leaders of the Palestinian Islamic Jihad. According to the Palestinian Health Ministry 10 of the dead were civilians, including four women and four children, among them wives and children of the PIJ leaders. The Israeli military stated that the air attacks targeted members of the group who were responsible for recent rocket attacks on Israel, including the commander of the al-Quds Brigades in the northern Gaza Strip. The PIJ confirmed the deaths of three of its leaders.

Two Palestinians were killed in an Israeli air attack on a car in Gaza. The military tweeted that the Palestinians were carrying anti-tank guided missiles.

=== 10 May ===
Israeli forces killed two Palestinians in a raid on Qabatiya near Jenin. The military said they were shot at from a vehicle and returned fire. Islamic Jihad claimed the men as members. Subsequently, a 30-year-old Palestinian succumbed to wounds received during the incident.

Israeli airstrikes on Gaza continued and the Palestinian death toll rose to 21. Shortly after renewed strikes commenced, militants launched hundreds of rockets into Israel, over 300 according to Israeli media.

=== 11 May ===
Palestinian deaths rose to 25 according to the Gaza Health ministry (27 according to Al Jazeera) as Israeli airstrikes continued for a third day while efforts to reach a ceasefire continued. According to the military a senior Islamic Jihad commander and two other militants were killed in a targeted strike. Although the claim could not be independently verified, the military also said that rockets falling in Gaza killed at least four, including a 10-year-old girl, two 16-year-olds and a 51-year-old man. Approximately 500 rockets have been fired into Israel.

An 80-year-old Israeli woman was killed and five others injured, for moderately and one lightly, after a rocket launched from Gaza hit an apartment building in Rehovot. Two homes in Sderot were also hit by the rockets, causing damage to the buildings but no casualties. The Israel Defense Forces stated that a technical problem occurred with an Iron Dome interceptor missile, causing it to miss the rocket launched from the Gaza Strip and that the problem was likely an isolated incident, as the missile defense system successfully intercepted 91 percent of the targeted projectiles.

=== 12 May ===
A PIJ senior leader and his aide were killed bringing total deaths in the current Gaza flareup to 33 Palestinians and 1 Israeli.

=== 13 May ===
Israeli forces killed two Palestinians in a raid on Balata refugee camp in Nablus. Witnesses said that the two were from protestors and not the subjects of the arrest raid.

Israeli forces killed a 33-year-old Palestinian at a Jenin checkpoint. The military said that the man ran towards soldiers with a knife.

A 34-year-old Palestinian laborer from Gaza was killed by a rocket fired from Gaza during the final hours of the five-day flareup. His 39-year-old brother was also seriously injured in the same incident, and an Israeli Bedouin guard was moderately wounded. The rocket struck an agricultural construction site near Shokeda, where the brothers were working in violation of IDF Home Front Command instructions, and there was no available bomb shelter for them to seek refuge. The incident highlighted the challenges and endangerment faced by foreign workers who are often unfamiliar with safety precautions and lack access to crucial information during emergencies. During the flareup, six foreign workers in areas near Gaza were injured, including individuals from Thailand, China, and Moldova. Israel declared that the killed laborer would be recognized as a victim of terror in a decision made by the defense minister and the National Insurance Institute, entitling his family to state benefits, including financial support for his widow and six children.

=== 15 May ===
Israeli forces killed a 22-year-old Palestinian in Askar refugee camp, Nablus during clashes that broke out when troops entered the area to measure a house for demolition.

For the first time the United Nations officially commemorated the Nakba. The event was attended by many member states from Asia, Africa, Central and South America and the Middle East including the majority of EU member states. The US and United Kingdom did not send a representative. The Israeli UN Ambassador called the event despicable, false and anti-Semitic while the Israeli foreign minister accused the Palestinians of spreading lies and distorting history. In his speech, the Palestinian president said that more than 1,000 UN resolutions concerning Palestinians had never been implemented and suggested that Israel should have its UN membership suspended.

=== 18 May ===
The heavily policed parade of Israel's Jerusalem Day passed without serious violence. The United States and the United Nations subsequently condemned anti-Arab slogans chanted during the event by overwhelmingly male Orthodox teens and young men.

=== 19 May ===
OCHA issued the Protection of Civilians Report covering the period 2–15 May 2023. During the reporting period, 45 Palestinians (139 year to date) were killed by Israeli forces and 1 Israelis (18 year to date) were killed by Palestinians. There were 124 Israeli military search and arrest operations in the West Bank (1405 year to date), and 44 Palestinian-owned structures were demolished (340 year to date including 96 in East Jerusalem). There were 33 attacks on Palestinians by Israeli settlers (385 year to date).

=== 21 May ===
Israeli National Security Minister Itamar Ben-Gvir visited the Temple Mount/Al-Aqsa compound together with his security secretary and police chief Kobi Shabtai. The visit was condemned by the Palestinians, Jordan and Egypt as a provocation and violation of the status quo. The U.S. later joined in the condemnation and criticized the "inflammatory rhetoric".

=== 22 May ===
Israeli forces killed three Palestinian militants and injured another six people during a large scale raid on the Balata refugee camp. The al-Aqsa Martyrs' Brigades identified the men killed as its members.

The US said it was "deeply troubled" by a decision permitting Israelis to enter Homesh noting Israel's previous determination that the outpost was built illegally on private Palestinian land.

=== 24 May ===
At a UN security council meeting on 24 May, the UK ambassador said Israel must tackle increasing settler violence leading to the forcible transfer of Palestinians. At Ein Samiya near Ramallah, a Palestinian herding community of 178 people, including 78 children prepared to leave their homes, citing settler violence.The EU added their condemnation of the situation.

=== 26 May ===
An Israeli settler killed a 28-year-old Palestinian in the Israeli settlement of Tene Omarim in the West Bank. The Palestinian entered the settlement by crawling under a security fence and said to have attempted to stab people although no Israeli casualties were reported.

=== 29 May ===
Israeli forces killed a 37-year-old Palestinian member of Fatah's intelligence service during an arrest raid in Jenin.

With Israeli government approval, Israeli settlers relocated a yeshiva established on private Palestinian land in Homesh, to a nearby spot designated state-owned land. The relocation was carried out despite international opposition, including repeatedly from the U.S., and the opposition of the Israeli attorney general.

=== 30 May ===
The Israeli army said that a 32-year-old Israeli settler was shot and killed by Palestinian gunmen while driving near Hermesh. The Al Aqsa Martyrs Brigades claimed responsibility.

A report, supported by 21 of the 23 member states with diplomatic representation in East Jerusalem or Ramallah, was sent to the EU's External Action service. It calls for the EU to oppose Israel's accelerating pressure to unilaterally alter the status and borders of Jerusalem. The report highlights the danger of completing a ring of settlements around Jerusalem. It also raises the issue of Israeli use of archaeology and tourism to "strengthen the Jewish and Biblical-inspired narrative about Jerusalem" and suggests a possible response.

== June ==
=== 1 June ===
A 2-year-old Palestinian child and his father were seriously wounded after being shot by Israeli forces. The incident occurred while the two were leaving their home in Nabi Saleh. Israeli soldiers claimed they opened fire in pursuit of gunmen who had previously attacked the nearby settlement of Neve Tzuf (Halamish). The boy was airlifted to an Israeli hospital but succumbed to his wounds on 5 June. The military stated that it regretted harm to "non-combatants" and that the incident was under investigation. Subsequently, the IDF said a soldier would not be disciplined as he mistakenly believed he was fired at by the Palestinians although communication deficiencies and incorrect decisions were cited.

=== 2 June ===
An Israeli soldier was lightly injured by shrapnel in the leg after Palestinian gunmen fired at soldiers from the Palestinian village of Deir Sharaf.

OCHA issued the Protection of Civilians Report covering the period 16–29 May 2023. During the reporting period, 4 Palestinians (143 year to date) were killed by Israeli forces and 0 Israelis (18 year to date) were killed by Palestinians. There were 118 Israeli military search and arrest operations in the West Bank (1558 year to date), and 48 Palestinian-owned structures were demolished (389 year to date including 104 in East Jerusalem). There were 24 attacks on Palestinians by Israeli settlers (409 year to date).

=== 6 June ===
An Israeli was lightly injured after his vehicle came under fire while he was driving near the Palestinian town of Huwara. The military launched a manhunt for the gunman.

=== 8 June ===
Israeli forces raided Ramallah and demolished the home of a Palestinian suspected of being responsible for the 2022 Jerusalem bombings. Clashes between Palestinians and the Israeli army erupted near his residence. The Palestinian health ministry reported that six individuals, including three with gunshot wounds, were taken to the hospital for treatment.

=== 9 June ===
A 29-year-old Palestinian man was shot and killed at an Israeli checkpoint near Ramallah. The Israeli military stated he arrived in a stolen vehicle at the Rantis checkpoint. While inspecting the vehicle, the driver allegedly attacked a soldier and attempted to seize his weapon, prompting another soldier to shoot him. An investigation into the incident is underway. Hamas commented that the incident demonstrated the readiness and capability of resistance in the West Bank to confront the occupation's crimes, although the group did not claim responsibility.

=== 13 June ===
Israeli forces killed a 19-year-old Palestinian during a raid on Balata refugee camp.

Later, an Israeli and four IDF soldiers were wounded during a shooting from a car near the Mevo Dotan settlement.

=== 15 June ===
Israeli forces killed a 20-year-old Palestinian during a demolition raid on Nablus. Since the beginning of 2022 through 8 June, B'tselem says that Israel has demolished 27 homes of suspected and convicted terrorists, 10 during 2023. While some commentators see it as politically motivated, Israel says that the purpose is deterrence although there is little evidence to support this and the U.S. State Department has called the practice "counterproductive to the cause of peace". Human rights groups view the policy as collective punishment and a possible war crime.

=== 18 June ===
OCHA issued the Protection of Civilians Report covering the period 30 May–12 June 2023. During the reporting period, 2 Palestinians (145 year to date) were killed by Israeli forces and 1 Israelis (19 year to date) were killed by Palestinians. There were 70 Israeli military search and arrest operations in the West Bank (1628 year to date), and 16 Palestinian-owned structures were demolished (398 year to date including 112 in East Jerusalem). There were 33 attacks on Palestinians by Israeli settlers (441 year to date).

=== 19 June ===
Israel shortened the procedure of approving settlement construction and gave Finance Minister Bezalel Smotrich the authority to approve one of the stages, changing the system operating for the last 27 years. The United States said it was "deeply troubled" by the Israeli plans that explicitly violate previous commitments made by Israel to the Biden administration. "The United States is deeply troubled by the Israeli government's reported decision to advance planning for over 4,000 settlement units in the West Bank. We are similarly concerned by reports of changes to Israel's system of settlement administration that expedite the planning and approvals of settlements". Tor Wennesland, United Nations Special Coordinator for the Middle East Peace Process urged a halt and reversal of the decisions and said "I am deeply concerned by the Israeli Government's decision yesterday to alter settlement planning procedures that have been in place since 1996, which is expected to expedite settlement expansion. I am also alarmed by the anticipated advancement next week of over 4,000 settlement housing units by Israeli planning authorities". The Israeli press reported that the US has informed Israel that the Negev forum on regional cooperation will be postponed as a result of the Israeli moves.

Israeli forces killed six Palestinians, including a 15-year-old boy, during a raid on Jenin. Dozens of Palestinians were wounded, some seriously. Seven soldiers were wounded. As troops were leaving the area, an IED detonated and disabled an Israeli vehicle. A military spokesman said that hours after the initial shootout, the army were extracting "personnel pinned down in five disabled vehicles at the scene". For the first time since the Second Intifada, an Israeli helicopter gunship was deployed. United Nations High Commissioner for Human Rights Volker Turk said he is "extremely worried by the situation" in Jenin, "including apparent executions by Israeli forces." The following day, a 15-year-old Palestinian girl injured in an exchange of fire between Israeli troops and Palestinian militants died from her wounds, raising the death toll of the raid to seven.

=== 20 June ===
A 20-year-old Palestinian was shot dead in the Husan village near Bethlehem during clashes between Israeli soldiers and Palestinians hurling Molotov cocktails.

In a shooting by Palestinians at a gas station near the West Bank settlement of Eli, four Israeli settlers were killed and four others were injured, including one seriously. The fatalities included a 17-year-old boy. A 26-year-old gunman was shot dead at the scene by an armed civilian, while the other fled in a car. He was located two hours later near Nablus and killed by Israeli forces. A Palestinian was moderately wounded in the shooting. Both gunmen were from the village of Urif, and one of them was a member of Hamas' armed wing. The group praised the shooting and stated it was a response to the raid on Jenin the day prior and to "aggression against the Al-Aqsa Mosque", but they did not claim responsibility. Hours after the attack, dozens of settlers rioted across villages near Nablus, injuring at least 34 and torching 140 cars. A few settlers opened fire at Palestinians who attempted to confront them, and there were reports of settlers attempting to attack IDF soldiers.

=== 21 June ===
A 27-year-old Palestinian man was killed near Turmus Aya, likely by an Israeli police officer according to the police. The killing occurred hours after Israeli settlers, some armed, set fire to houses and cars in the area. The police arrived after the settlers had left and clashes broke out with local Palestinians. In a statement, the EU said "We condemn the current outbreak of settler violence across the West Bank, resulting in unacceptable indiscriminate violence against Palestinian civilians and the destruction of Palestinian property" and "We recall that Israel has the obligation to ensure the protection of Palestinian civilians in the occupied territory".

Settlers attacked the Palestinian village of Al-Lubban ash-Sharqiya in what was described as a pogrom by +972 Magazine. 5 villagers were injured by live fire, a 12-year-old boy on a bicycle was hit by a settler car and then beaten; 30 vehicles were set on fire; 10 homes were damaged, two shops and a gas station vandalized, together with agricultural fields, a wheat silo and telegraph poles. Similar incidents of settler violence broke out at Za'atara Junction, Yitzhar Junction, Huwara, Qabalan, and Bitin. Yesh Din reported that Israeli police and IDF soldiers were present at, but did not interfere with, the rampages.

An Israeli drone strike killed three Palestinian militants in a car. The military said it had "identified a terrorist cell inside a suspicious vehicle" alleged to have carried out shooting attacks on Jewish settlements. The Times of Israel said that two of the dead were Palestinian Islamic Jihad members and the third belonged to the Al-Aqsa Martyrs' Brigades while according to AP, all three were claimed by PIJ. This was considered the first targeted killing in the West Bank since 2006.

=== 23 June ===
Following U.S. Ambassador to Israel Tom Nides condemnation of Israeli settler violence, National Security spokesman John Kirby said the United States is "actively engaging" with Israel on the question. A closed meeting of the United nations Security Council requested by China, France, and the United Arab Emirates (UAE) is expected to discuss the matter as well as the increasing violence in the West bank generally. Senior Israeli Defense officials have raised concerns over the issue pointing to Minister of National Security Itamar Ben-Gvir as a significant contributor to the problem. Settler attacks on Palestinians reached record levels in 2022 and continue to increase in 2023 with the issue being repeatedly raised by European and US officials and latterly by Miloon Kothari of the UNHRC Commission of Inquiry who announced plans to investigate and said "We are very disturbed that violent settler activity has considerably increased in the last months and it's... becoming, in fact, the means through which (Israeli) annexation is insured."

=== 24 June ===
A 39-year-old Palestinian was shot and critically injured by Israeli forces during a raid on Askar refugee camp on 23 June, and later died from his wounds.

Israeli forces killed a 17-year-old Palestinian from East Jerusalem who, according to Israeli police, fired on Israeli forces at the Qalandia checkpoint.

According to residents, around 50 Israeli settlers armed with rifles and flammable liquid entered Umm Safa and set fire to houses and vehicles, the sixth settler mob attack on a Palestinian town during the week.

=== 27 June ===
The US criticized Israel's advancement of plans for 5,700 new homes in Jewish settlements and said it was "an obstacle to peace".

== July ==
=== 3 July ===
In a military operation centered around the Jenin refugee camp, involving hundreds of troops and multiple drone strikes, Israeli forces killed at least eight Palestinians and injured dozens, some critically. The IDF said that they were engaged in an "extensive counterterrorism effort" across Jenin and in the refugee camp. A 16-year-old Palestinian named Abdul Rahman Hassan Ahmad Hardan was reportedly killed. Despite Israel's claim that all those who were killed were combatants, video footage of the incident shows that Abdul Rahman was unarmed when he was shot. A month later, a 20-year-old Palestinian died of his wounds.

A 21-year-old Palestinian was killed by Israeli forces near Ramallah, according to the Palestinian health ministry.

An Israeli man was stabbed and lightly wounded in Bnei Brak by a 14-year-old Palestinian from a village in the Jenin area. The attacker fled the scene but was captured. He allegedly said that he carried out the stabbing in response to the incursion in Jenin.

=== 4 July ===
Israeli forces killed two Palestinians, bringing total deaths to ten, as a military operation in Jenin continued for a second day. Thousands of residents have fled the refugee camp to Jenin proper.

7 Israelis were wounded in a car ramming and stabbing attack in Tel Aviv. The assailant, a 20-year-old Palestinian from the West Bank, was shot dead by a civilian.

A 22-year-old Palestinian died from wounds sustained during the Jenin assault, raising the death toll to 11.

=== 5 July ===
Israeli forces withdrew from Jenin with at least 12 Palestinians and one Israeli soldier dead. It is being investigated whether the Israeli death was due to friendly fire.

=== 6 July ===
An IDF soldier was killed after a Palestinian gunman opened fire at security forces who had stopped to inspect his vehicle near the Israeli settlement of Kedumim. The assailant was killed by Israeli forces after fleeing the scene. The attack was claimed by Hamas, who referred to it as a "heroic operation" in retaliation for the Israeli incursion in Jenin two days prior.

=== 7 July ===
Israeli forces killed two Palestinians in a raid on Nablus. Israeli officials said that the men were behind a shooting attack on a police vehicle earlier in the week.

Israeli forces killed a 24-year-old Palestinian near the village of Umm Safa according to Palestinian health ministry.

=== 8 July ===
OCHA issued the Protection of Civilians Report covering the period 13 June–4 July 2023. During the reporting period, 32 Palestinians (177 year to date) were killed by Israeli forces and 5 Israelis (24 year to date) were killed by Palestinians. There were 139 Israeli military search and arrest operations in the West Bank (1800 year to date), and 41 Palestinian-owned structures were demolished (451 year to date including 129 in East Jerusalem). There were 84 attacks on Palestinians by Israeli settlers (525 year to date).

=== 10 July ===
Israeli forces killed a 33-year-old Palestinian man in Deir Nidham. The military said troops stopped a motorist who got out of his car, threw a grenade and fired shots.

=== 11 July ===
Following the rejection of a final appeal, a 45-year-long legal battle ended with the eviction of a Palestinian family from their apartment in Jerusalem's Old City. Activists say the eviction is part of a wider trend of Israeli settlers seizing property in East Jerusalem while Israel describes it as a real estate dispute. Israeli law allows Jews to reclaim properties owned by Jews before 1948 while there is no equivalent right for hundreds of thousands of Palestinians who fled or were forced from their homes to return to lost properties.

=== 20 July ===
A 19-year-old Palestinian was killed during clashes between Israeli troops and Nablus residents that broke out during a visit of thousands of Jewish worshipers, including Israel's police chief Kobi Shabtai, to Joseph's Tomb, heavily accompanied by security forces. Four other Palestinians were wounded by gunfire, and 30 others suffered tear gas inhalation, including a baby and a 12-year-old girl. The IDF reported that Palestinians attacked the group as they entered the city, prompting security forces to respond with crowd dispersal measures and gunfire. The Nablus battalion of the Al-Quds Brigades stated they were fighting against the occupation forces and settlers in the area. Senior police officials criticized Shabtai for the dangerous and unnecessary visit.

A 25-year-old Israeli man was seriously injured in a stabbing attack in the Gilo settlement in East Jerusalem. 3 suspects aged between 17 and 19, from Bethlehem, were arrested.

=== 21 July ===
Israeli forces killed a 17-year-old Palestinian in Umm Safa, north of Ramallah. The army said they opened fire at Palestinians throwing rocks.

=== 22 July ===
Israeli forces killed an 18-year-old Palestinian in disputed circumstances. The army said that two Palestinian men tried to drive a car into soldiers at Sebastia who opened fire but the claim could not be verified. The Palestinian foreign ministry called for an international investigation into the killing. On 28 August, B'tselem published an account of the incident and noting that an Israeli court rejected the car ramming allegation.

=== 25 July ===
Israeli forces killed three Palestinian gunmen in Nablus. The military said the Palestinians fired at them from a car.

=== 26 July ===
Israeli forces killed a 23-year-old Palestinian near Nablus while arresting two other Palestinians. According to a witness, the man was an uninvolved bystander.

=== 27 July ===
Israeli forces killed a 14-year-old Palestinian in Qalqilya during confrontations with Palestinian youths.

For the third time as a cabinet member, far-right minister Itamar Ben Gvir made a provocative visit to Temple Mount/Al-Aqsa drawing condemnations from Palestinians, the US, the UK and the governments of Jordan, Saudi Arabia, Turkey and Egypt.

=== 29 July ===
OCHA issued the Protection of Civilians Report covering the period 5–24 July 2023. During the reporting period, 8 Palestinians (185 year to date) were killed by Israeli forces and 1 Israeli (25 year to date) was killed by Palestinians. There were 215 Israeli military search and arrest operations in the West Bank (2015 year to date), and 67 Palestinian-owned structures were demolished (542 year to date including 141 in East Jerusalem). There were 56 attacks on Palestinians by Israeli settlers (581 year to date).

== August ==
=== 1 August ===
A 20-year-old Palestinian man shot and wounded six outside a mall in the settlement of Ma'ale Adumim before being shot and killed by an off-duty Israeli police officer. Hamas praised the attack, describing it as a "heroic shooting operation in defense of the al-Aqsa Mosque and in response to the settler invasions" and as "a punch to the face of Ben-Gvir and his invasion of the Al-Aqsa Mosque."

Israeli rights group Hamoked reported that Israel was holding 1,201 detainees without charge or trial, a three-decade high. 99% of the detainees are Palestinian. A quarter of all Palestinians held are in "administrative detention".

Israeli forces killed a 15-year-old Palestinian near as-Samu, south of Hebron. The Palestinian allegedly attempted to stab two soldiers at the Eshtemoa intersection.

=== 4 August ===
Israeli forces killed an 18-year-old Palestinian during a raid in Tulkarem. The military said Palestinians threw stones and explosives and they returned fire.

Israeli settlers killed a 19-year-old Palestinian in Burqa. Two settlers were subsequently arrested. According to OCHA, the UN recorded 591 settler-related incidents in the first half of 2023, a 39 per cent increase in the monthly average compared with 2022 which was already the highest number since the UN began recording data in 2006. Far-right National Security Minister Ben-Gvir supported the settler action while opposition member Benny Gantz called it a "dangerous nationalistic Jewish terrorism", criticized Israel's "national leadership" for its "silence, lack of support for security forces" and "the fact that government and coalition members are backing the same extremists [which carry out the attacks]." Washington condemned the killing "in sharpened language that appeared to reflect U.S. frustration with the recent surge in violence under Israel's hard-right government."

=== 5 August ===
A Palestinian gunman opened fire in central Tel Aviv, killing a 42-year-old Israeli municipal patrol officer before being shot and killed by another officer. The perpetrator was identified as a 27-year-old man from the Jenin area, who had been evading capture in the refugee camp for the past six months. The attack was praised by the Islamic Jihad. The Israeli military prepared the family home of the Palestinian for demolition.

=== 6 August ===
Israeli forces killed three Palestinian gunmen in a car south of Jenin. The military said the men were on their way to carry out an attack.

=== 7 August ===
A 17-year-old Palestinian wounded earlier near Silwad, died. IDF sources said that on 2 August the Palestinian threw a firebomb towards Ofra and was shot by Israeli soldiers.

=== 10 August ===
Israeli forces killed a 27-year-old Palestinian militant during a raid on Zawata, west of Nablus. The military said that a Palestinian suspect fired at its troops who returned fire.

=== 11 August ===
Israeli forces killed a 23-year-old Palestinian militant in during a raid on Tulkarm. The military said Palestinians fired at them and they returned fire.

OCHA issued the Protection of Civilians Report covering the period 25 July – 7 August 2023. During the reporting period, 11 Palestinians (196 year to date) were killed by Israeli forces and 1 Israeli (26 year to date) was killed by Palestinians. There were 116 Israeli military search and arrest operations in the West Bank (2152 year to date), and 56 Palestinian-owned structures were demolished (626 year to date including 144 in East Jerusalem). There were 20 attacks on Palestinians by Israeli settlers (692 year to date).

=== 12 August ===
Saudi Arabia named its ambassador to Jordan, Nayef al-Sudairi, as "nonresident ambassador to the State of Palestine" and also as consul general in Jerusalem for Palestinian engagement in a nod to Palestinian claims in Jerusalem. The move comes amid discussion of a potential normalization of relations between Israel and Saudi Arabia although sources stress this as some way off.

=== 15 August ===
Israeli forces killed two Palestinians, aged 16 and 25, during a raid on the Aqabat Jabr refugee camp. The military said that Palestinians opened fire at them and they returned fire.

=== 17 August ===
Israeli forces killed a 32-year-old Palestinian militant during an arrest raid in Jenin. The military said they came under fire and shot back.

=== 18 August ===
Israeli authorities demolished a school in Ein Samiya following the forced displacement of most of the Bedouin community in May. EU representatives visited the site on 12 August and condemned the upcoming demolition.

=== 19 August ===
A 19-year-old Palestinian died from wounds sustained on 15 August in an exchange of fire between Palestinian gunmen and Israeli soldiers near Joseph's Tomb, near Nablus.

A 60-year-old Israeli man and his 29-year-old son, residents of Ashdod, were shot and killed at a carwash in Huwara, allegedly by a Palestinian. The attack was praised by Hamas and Palestinian Islamic Jihad, who called it "heroic" and "a natural response to the crimes of the occupation." A manhunt was launched for the gunman.

=== 20 August ===
A suspected Palestinian gunman killed a 40-year-old Israeli woman from Beit Hagai and seriously wounded an Israeli man traveling by car in the South Hebron Hills near Hebron. The attack was praised by Palestinian militant groups. Two Palestinians were subsequently arrested on suspicion of carrying out the attack.

=== 21 August ===
Israeli forces killed a 17-year-old Palestinian during an arrest raid in Zababdeh, south of Jenin. Islamic Jihad claimed the Palestinian as a fighter. The military said Palestinians threw explosive devices and they returned fire.

Israeli forces shot and critically wounded a 34-year-old Palestinian in Beita. A video shows the victim as unarmed and being shot in the back. The US said "The United States urges a rapid completion of an objective, thorough investigation into the incident, which we understand is ongoing, and calls for full accountability in this case".

In a report to the UNSC, Tor Wennesland said 2023 to date had seen the highest number of fatalities since 2005 and that "The lack of progress towards a political horizon that addressed the core issues driving the conflict has left a dangerous and volatile vacuum, filled by extremists on all sides."

According to an investigation by Haaretz and rights groups B'Tselem and Yesh Din, as with the 4 August killing in Burqa, eight other Palestinians have been killed in the past 15 years. In none of the cases has an Israeli been brought to trial. An EU delegation condemned the growth in settler violence.

On Route 60, 39-year-old Aryeh Gutliv from Beit Hagai drove his neighbors 40-year-old Bat Sheva Negri and her 12-year-old daughter to Kiryat Arba. When they reached "The Sheep Junction", a passing vehicle opened fire at Gutliv's car, killing Negri. Negri's daughter was unharmed in the attack, while Gutliv was seriously wounded and evacuated to Soroka Hospital. Bat Sheva Negri was killed. Less than a day after the attack, Yamam fighters arrested Mohammed and Zakaria Shantir, brothers from Hebron. The weapon they used was also seized and their home was demolished.

=== 28 August ===
OCHA issued the Protection of Civilians Report covering the period 8–21 August 2023. During the reporting period, 6 Palestinians (202 year to date) were killed by Israeli forces and 3 Israelis (29 year to date) were killed by Palestinians. There were 143 Israeli military search and arrest operations in the West Bank (2335 year to date), and 35 Palestinian-owned structures were demolished (670 year to date including 148 in East Jerusalem). There were 21 attacks on Palestinians by Israeli settlers (713 year to date).

Human Rights Watch said that Israeli forces kill Palestinian children "with virtually no recourse for accountability" and that 2022 was the deadliest year for Palestinian children in 15 years. Groups like NGO Monitor claimed Human Rights Watch ignored "publicly available evidence of their terror affiliations" and "[failed] to condemn their participation in violent acts during the time of their death."

=== 30 August ===
Israeli forces killed a 14-year-old Palestinian resident of East Jerusalem who stabbed a man in a Jerusalem light-rail station. After the stabbing, a crows of people "began to struggle with the terrorist," according to Israeli police.

Palestinian militants detonated a bomb near a convoy of Israeli troops who were escorting Jewish worshippers to Joseph's Tomb outside Nablus. According to the Israeli army, the bomb wounded four soldiers.

=== 31 August ===
A 41-year-old Palestinian truck driver rammed a group of soldiers at the Beit Sira checkpoint, killing one, and after driving away, was himself killed by Israeli forces at a nearby checkpoint.

The family of 13-year-old Palestinian who stabbed an Israeli border officer in February was informed of the impending demolition of the family home. An Israeli court approved the demolition a week earlier in a 2 to 1 decision. The case has focused attention on the practice of demolishing homes of Palestinian assailants, a policy being aggressively pursued by the current government which says that the policy is a deterrence. The Palestinian is awaiting trial on murder charges although the stabbed border guard was accidentally killed by another officer. Rights groups including Amnesty have denounced the policy as collective punishment-

== September ==
=== 1 September ===
Israeli forces killed a 36-year-old Palestinian man after a gunfight broke out with Palestinian militants during a raid to captured suspected militants in 'Aqqaba. The military said that he was a gunman. The man's cousin and the Palestinian Health Ministry stated he was uninvolved.The Israeli military conducted raids in several towns in the West Bank, including Nablus, arresting seven suspected militants.

Most of the communities that lived in an area of 150 square kilometers east from Ramallah to the outskirts of Jericho have fled due to Israeli settler violence and land seizures. More than 10 settler outposts have been established in the area. The settlers use the pasturing of sheep as a means of forcing Palestinians off their land. The Belgian minister for international development said "entire villages are being wiped off the map by the Israelis" leading to the Belgian ambassador being summoned by Israel for a diplomatic dressing down while 972 Mag said "Israel's slow but gradual process of ethnic cleansing is continuing apace, effectively annexing large swathes of the occupied territory for exclusive Jewish settlement."

=== 5 September ===
Israeli forces killed a 21-year-old Palestinian Islamic Jihad member during an operation to uncover a bomb cache at the Nur Shams refugee camp. The military said they were fired on and returned fire.

Israeli forces killed a 17-year-old Palestinian gunman near Jericho. The military said he opened fire at them, wounding an Israeli soldier, and they returned fire.

=== 6 September ===
The Middle East Media Research Institute (MEMRI), a Washington-based media-monitoring group considered close to Israel, published an English translation of Palestinian President Abbas speech given on 24 August 2023 to senior Fatah officials. In addition to other claims, Abbas presented the discredited Khazar hypothesis of Ashkenazi ancestry as fact in a speech widely condemned as anti-Semitic. It was unclear why diplomats issued statements only after MEMRI translated and published the claims that Abbas made, two weeks after Abbas made them. Abbas has a history of making doubtful claims with one aim being, according to the BBC, to "dispute the connection between the Jewish people and modern-day Israel" since "Rights to the land lie at the core of the Israel-Palestinian conflict and are entwined with the historical narratives of both peoples." Critics also accuse Abbas of not being genuinely committed to resolving the ongoing conflict. Abbas, who is deeply unpopular at home, was subsequently condemned by dozens of Palestinian intellectuals.

Reports by Haaretz and B'Tselem described the strip searching of five female members of a Palestinian family by two masked Israeli women soldiers in the West Bank city of Hebron in July. UN deputy spokesperson Farhan Haq stated that "We would stand against any form of collective punishment. Obviously, this reported incident needs to be looked at and investigated thoroughly".

A Palestinian male child militant committed a stabbing attack outside the Jaffa Gate, the main entrance to the Old City of Jerusalem. Two Israeli civilians were injured by the militant and both were hospitalized. Magen David Adom service said one of them was moderately hurt and other slightly. The militant was arrested after a short chase from Israeli authorities. Additionally, one female Israeli civilian was treated for anxiety precipitated by the stabbing attack. Al-Fajr Brigade, a Palestinian militant group said it was response to the incident where five Palestinian women were strip searched by two female IDF soldiers.

=== 9 September ===
A 16-year-old Palestinian was killed by an Israeli soldier at the entrance of the Al-Arroub refugee camp near Hebron. According to the IDF, several Palestinian militants hurled Molotov cocktails at some IDF soldiers stationed near that refugee camp entrance, prompting those soldiers to respond with live fire. According to the Palestinian Health ministry, the teen was shot in the back.

=== 11 September ===
OCHA issued the Protection of Civilians Report covering the period 22 August – 4 September 2023. During the reporting period, 5 Palestinians (207 year to date) were killed by Israeli forces and 1 Israeli (30 year to date) was killed by Palestinians. There were 173 Israeli military search and arrest operations in the West Bank (2513 year to date), and 15 Palestinian-owned structures were demolished (686 year to date including 155 in East Jerusalem). There were 23 attacks on Palestinians by Israeli settlers (736 year to date).

=== 12 September ===
Two Israeli civilian-settlers were injured in a drive-by shooting while travelling near the Beita junction. The perpetrators are believed to be Palestinians.

=== 18 September ===
A Palestinian 47-year-old man from Bethlehem area was shot and severely wounded by Israeli police after attempting to carry out a stabbing attack at the Mazmuria checkpoint near the Har Homa neighborhood of southern East Jerusalem.

=== 20 September ===
Over a 24-hour period, 7 Palestinians, including 3 militants belonging to Palestinian Islamic Jihad or Hamas, were killed by Israeli forces. Two other unaffiliated militants were killed by the IDF during the raid. The first brandished a rifle on a social media post, indicating his militancy. The second was a 15-year-old male killed by Israeli undercover forces after he blew their cover. Another Palestinian was killed and nine were wounded during clashes at the Gaza border. According to Israel, some protesters, including the fatality, were hurling explosives at Israeli soldiers stationed on the border, which prompted the IDF to respond with live fire. The seventh was killed during a raid on Aqabat Jabr refugee camp. According to Israel, he hurled explosives at raiding soldiers, prompting them to shoot him.

=== 21 September ===
Violence from Israeli settlers has displaced over 1,100 Palestinians in the occupied West Bank since 2022, according to a U.N. report. The report documented approximately three settler-related incidents per day resulting in the emptying of five Palestinian communities, six rendered half empty and a further seven have lost a quarter of their population. Lynn Hastings, humanitarian coordinator for the occupied Palestinian territory said "The U.N. has recorded unprecedented levels of settler violence against Palestinians this year."

Israeli activist settlers from the far-right Im Tirtzu harassed a delegation from the European Union Delegation to the Palestinians visiting Palestinian communities near Ramallah. The delegation wrote on X (previously twitter) that "We reiterate our concern over the growing problem of settler violence and call on Israel's authorities to take action against violent settlers." The activists were arrested by Palestinian Authority security forces and handed over to Israel.

A Palestinian was shot and severely wounded after allegedly stabbing an Israeli security guard at a Jerusalem light rail station, while another Palestinian was seriously injured after allegedly opening fire on Israeli troops at the Gaza border fence. The IDF released video footage showing "a man firing a pistol toward soldiers before he was shot by a sniper."

An Israeli security guard was injured in a suspected car ramming at the Qalandiya check point north of Jerusalem. According to Israeli police, a 38-year-old Palestinian from Kafr 'Aqab was detained at the scene. Police believe the man could have been suicidal due to finding a boxcutter in his car.

=== 22 September ===
Israeli forces killed an 18-year-old Palestinian militant during a raid on Kafr Dan. The militant was said to be a Palestinian Islamic Jihad and a combatant member of their Al Quds Brigade and the multifactional Jenin Brigade.

Clashes along the Gaza border intensified. Israel launched airstrikes after Palestinian border protesters launched incendiary balloons into Israel. Palestinian protesters hurled explosives at Israeli soldiers stationed along the border prompting the soldiers to respond with tear gas and live fire. Palestinian health officials said Israeli fire wounded 28 Palestinians. The Palestinian protesters said they were demonstrating against recent Jewish visits to the Temple Mount/Al-Aqsa compound. Israel has closed the Erez Crossing since 19 September in response to intercepting a shipment containing explosives.

=== 23 September ===
The US State Department, reacting to comments by Israeli National Security Minister Itamar Ben Gvir said "We strongly condemn Minister Ben Gvir's racist, destructive comments on the freedom of movement of Palestinian residents of the West Bank. Such messages are particularly damaging when amplified by those in leadership positions… President [Joe] Biden and Secretary [of State Antony] Blinken have been clear that both Israelis and Palestinians deserve to enjoy equal measures of freedom and security." The EU also condemned the comments while Israeli prime minister Netanyahu defended Ben Gvir.

=== 24 September ===
Israeli forces killed two Palestinian militants during a raid on the Nour Shams refugee camp to destroy what the military said was "a militant command center and bomb-storage facility in a building." The army said they were fired on and returned fire. Hamas confirmed both militants were killed "in battle" with the IDF and another said to be a Hamas member.

According to the IDF, one Israeli soldier was wounded in the exchange of fire. 8 Birzeit University students were arrested by the IDF in a raid on the university. According to the IDF, they were recruited by Hamas operatives in the Gaza Strip for planning a militant attack and additionally some of the suspects confessed to the allegations.Hamas, PIJ, and PFLP, agreed to "escalate their fight against" Israel and to increase cooperation among themselves, per a joint statement they issued after top officials from all three militant organizations met in Beirut.

=== 25 September ===
Palestinian border protesters burned tires, threw stones, hurled makeshift bombs and shot bullets from guns toward Israeli soldiers stationed at the Gaza-Israel border and launched incendiary balloons toward Israel. This prompted the IDF to use sniper fire and crowd dispersal methods. According to the IDF, it also struck two Hamas militant positions in the Gaza Strip and arrested two Palestinians who attempted to cross from the Strip to Israel. Based on the timing of the IDF statement, it is possible the strike occurred on Yom Kippur, the holiest day of the Jewish calendar.

=== 26 September ===
Saudi Arabia's newly appointed envoy to the Palestinian Authority, Nayef al-Sudairi, began a two-day visit to the West Bank to present his credentials to Palestinian Authority President Mahmoud Abbas. During the visit, al-Sudairi said that Saudi Arabia "is working towards establishing a Palestinian state with East Jerusalem as its capital". This event came almost immediately after Israel and Saudi Arabia confirmed significant progress on the negotiation of an Israel-Saudi Arabia normalization agreement. However, details of negotiations are not yet known to the public.

Germany criticized Israeli Prime Minister Benjamin Netanyahu for presenting at the UN a map of "The New Middle East" that did not include Palestine. "Showing a map that does not show territories that are occupied or annexed, so to speak, is something that we naturally reject and that it is of no help with regard to the efforts to reach a negotiated two-state solution." said German Foreign Ministry spokesman Sebastian Fischer.

OCHA issued the Protection of Civilians Report covering the period 5–18 September 2023. During the reporting period, 3 Palestinians (212 year to date) were killed by Israeli forces and 0 Israelis (30 year to date) werer killed by Palestinians. There were 118 Israeli military search and arrest operations in the West Bank (2642 year to date), and 27 Palestinian-owned structures were demolished (713 year to date including 162 in East Jerusalem). There were 24 attacks on Palestinians by Israeli settlers (798 year to date).

=== 29 September ===
Israeli forces killed a Palestinian near al-Bireh. The army said that the man, together with another, threw firebombs at a military post. Hamas claimed the man as a member.

Qatar says it successfully mediated an agreement between Israel and officials in the Gaza Strip to reopen the Erez Crossing between Israel and Gaza. The opening occurred after two weeks of demonstrations by Palestinian workers and Qatar-broker diplomacy involving Egypt, Israel and Hamas. Israel closed the crossing in response to violent protesting on the Gaza side of the border which the protesters said was a response to provocations at Al Aqsa. The protests involved Palestinians throwing stones and explosive devices, burning tires and, according to the Israeli military, shooting at Israeli soldiers.

== October ==
=== 3 October ===
Israeli settlers are setting up wildcat herding outposts, often near Palestinian villages, according to Kerem Navot, an independent Israeli watchdog that monitors settlement activity. The group says 20 new outposts have been established during 2023 over more than 140 square miles and the simultaneous retreat of Palestinians from the same rural areas.

=== 4 October ===
According to OCHA, 84 Palestinians have left Masafer Yatta since July. The UN said the forced transfer of citizens is illegal and called on Israel to halt the restrictions on movement, destruction of structures and the conducting of military exercises.

=== 5 October ===
Israeli forces killed two Palestinian militants during a raid on Tulkarem refugee camp. The military said soldiers were fired on and troops shot Palestinian gunmen. Five border police officers were wounded. Hamas claimed the two Palestinians as members.

Later, in Huwara, a Palestinian gunman who fired at an Israeli car was killed by Israeli forces. Following this incident, Israeli settlers, including far-right lawmaker Zvi Sukkot, arrived in Hawara, leading to clashes between settlers and Palestinians. According to Palestinian media and witnesses, a 19-year-old Palestinian was killed by a settler. It remained unclear as of 6 October whether the Palestinian was killed by the military or by a settler.

=== 6 October ===
UN Special Coordinator for the Middle East Peace Process, Tor Wennesland, in a statement, said "I condemn today's attack by Israeli settlers against Palestinians and their property in the town of Huwara in occupied West Bank". The EU also issued a statement of its concern over the Huwara incident.

=== 7 October ===
Hamas announces the start of Operation Al-Aqsa Flood, firing over 5000 rockets at 6:30 a.m. (IST) from the Gaza Strip into Israel. Simultaneously, Around 6,000 Palestinians breached the border in 119 places and infiltrated Israel, including 3,800 militants from the Hamas "elite Nukhba forces" and 2,200 Palestinian civilians and other Gazan militants. Images and videos appeared to show gunmen opening fire in Sderot, killing a large number of Israeli civilians and several soldiers. A video from Gaza showed the lifeless body of an Israeli soldier being trampled on by a crowd shouting "God is Great." Other videos appeared to show Israelis taken prisoner and a burning Israeli tank. Infiltrators were also spotted at Be'eri and Netiv HaAsara, where they took at least dozens of hostages. Hamas issued a call to arms, with Mohammad Deif stating "I call on Muslims everywhere to launch an attack". The Israeli army declared a "state of readiness for war" and said that it attacked targets in Gaza under Operation Swords of Iron.

Israeli civilians were massacred by Hamas militants in several towns near the border with Gaza Strip during Hamas' incursion into southern Israel. In the Re'im music festival massacre, at least 260 civilian festival-goers were massacred. In the Be'eri massacre, at least 110 civilians were massacred. In the Kfar Aza massacre, around 100 civilians were killed. In the Netiv HaAsara massacre, at least 15 civilians were massacred. In total, at least 485 Israeli civilians were massacred on that day. In addition, between 100 and 150 Israeli civilians were taken hostage by Hamas.

Two Palestinians were killed by Israeli forces. According to the Ministry of Health, one was killed in Ramallah and another in Jericho. Israeli forces killed a Palestinian during clashes at the entrance of Al-Bireh and a 13-year-old boy in Qalqilya. Israeli forces killed a 19-year-old Palestinian in Hebron and an 18-year-old Palestinian in Beit Ummar.

=== 8 October ===
- Israeli forces killed a Palestinian during clashes near Deir Sharaf, west of Nablus. There has been 7 fatalities in the West Bank in less than 24 hours.
- Israeli forces killed a Palestinian during confrontations at the northern entrance to Jericho, three Palestinians during clashes at the Qalandia military checkpoint and another Palestinian wash was shot dead during clashes in Hebron city. Subsequently, a fourth Palestinian died from his wounds. Israeli forces killed a Palestinian during confrontations at Beita.
- OCHA confirmed that in the West Bank, including East Jerusalem, "between 7 and 8 October, as of 21:00, 13 Palestinians, including a 12-year-old child, were killed by Israeli forces in various areas across the West Bank." One was killed while attacking or allegedly attempting to stab a soldier near Ramallah. Another was killed during clashes near Nablus. The remaining eleven Palestinians were all killed "during demonstrations in solidarity with the Gaza Strip and other confrontations involving stone throwing."
- Israel formally declared a state of war under Article 40A for the first time since the 1973 Yom Kippur War. 300,000 reservists are called up, the most in the nation's history. Its declared aim is to eliminate Hamas's military capabilities and end its rule over the Gaza Strip.
- Evacuations of residents in Israel living near the Gaza Strip were ordered, and Netanyahu appointed former brigadier general Gal Hirsch as the government's point man on missing and kidnapped citizens. A total lockdown was imposed on the West Bank by the IDF.
- US Defense Secretary Lloyd Austin ordered the deployment of the USS Gerald Ford carrier strike group to the eastern Mediterranean.
- The US Air Force augmented its F-35, F-15, F-16, and A-10 squadrons in the region. Hamas condemned the US Navy deployment as "aggression against the Palestinian people".
- Hezbollah announced on Sunday, October 8, that it had initiated guided rockets and artillery strikes on three outposts in the Shebaa Farms region as a show of support for the Palestinian people. During an event held in the Hezbollah stronghold of Dahieh on the outskirts of Beirut, senior Hezbollah official Hashem Safieddine declared, "Our history, our weapons, and our rockets stand in solidarity with you."

=== 9 October ===
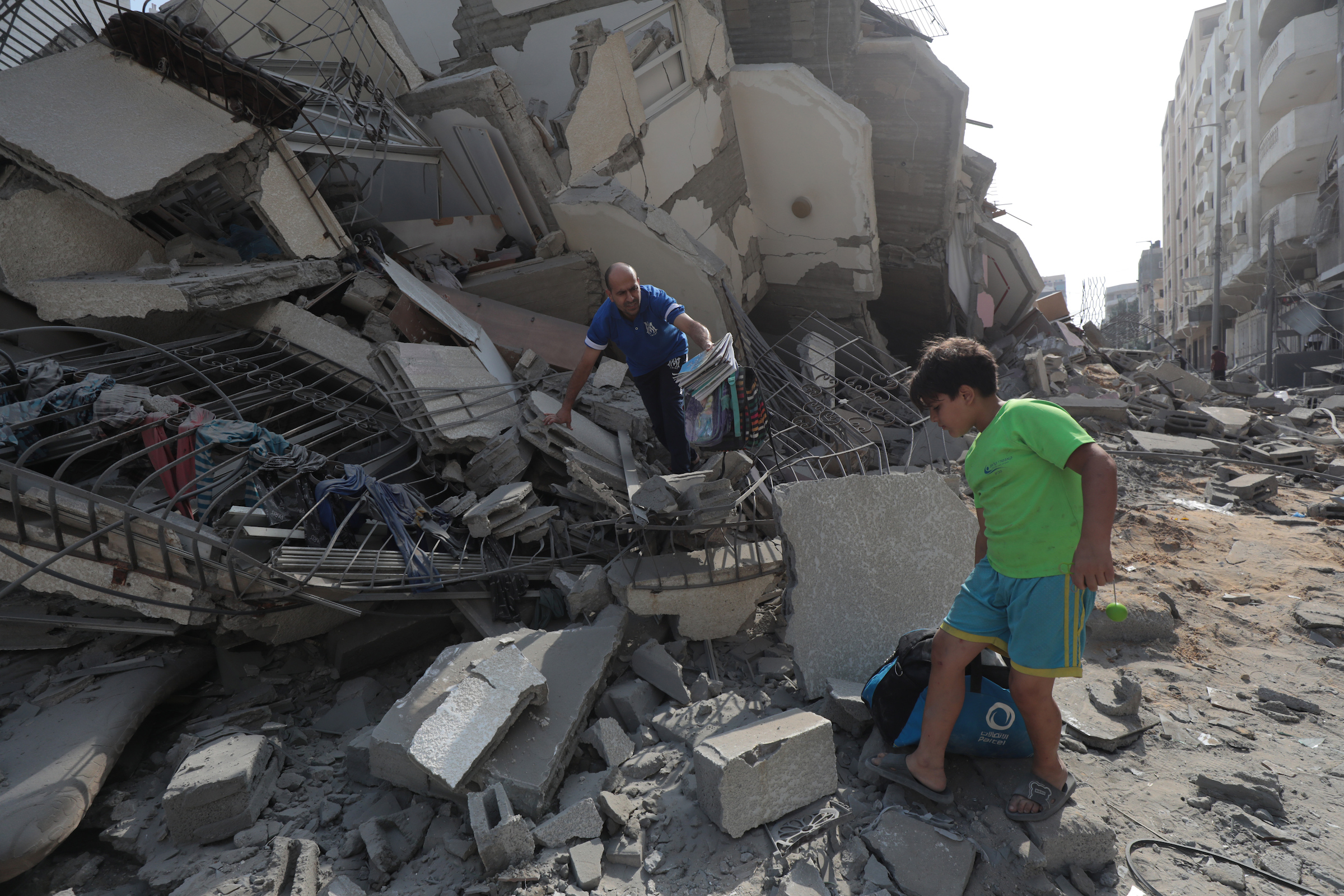
Ruins of a residential area in Gaza City on 9 October 2023

- A Palestinian was killed by Israeli forces in Hebron after an attack on Kiryat Arba with a tractor bringing the death toll to 15 since 7 October.
- Israeli forces killed a Palestinian and wounded others driving in a car South of Hebron.
- OCHA confirmed that in the West Bank, including East Jerusalem, "between 7 and 9 October, as of 16:00, 15 Palestinians, including four children, were killed by Israeli forces in various areas across the West Bank."

=== 10 October ===
- As the Gaza Israel conflict entered a fourth day, 900+ people have been killed and 2,600+ wounded in Israel. Hamas gunmen are said to be holding about 150 hostages. At least 687 Palestinians were killed and at least 3,726 injured. Israeli Prime Minister Benjamin Netanyahu warned of a long war ahead.
- OCHA confirmed that "Between 7 and 10 October, as of 16:00, 19 Palestinians, including three children, were killed by Israeli forces in various areas across the West Bank."
- The IAF struck more than 70 targets in and around Daraja Tuffah.
- Advanced weaponry from the US arrived in Israel, its first such shipment of the war.
- Israel's Coordinator of Government Activities in the Territories (COGAT) revoked all work permits issued to Gaza residents, stripping Gazan workers of their legal status under Israeli law and triggering a wave of administrative detentions.

=== 11 October ===
- Israeli forces killed at least 27 Palestinians during clashes in the West Bank since 7 October. It is reported that the entire West Bank has been placed under an Israeli lockdown.
- Israeli settlers attacked the village of Qusra, killing four Palestinians. A 16-year old was fatally shot by the IDF in Bani Naim, while another person was also shot dead by the IDF near Bethlehem.
- Israeli forces bombed the Gaza–Egypt Rafah Border Crossing.
- Israeli warplanes attacked and destroyed several buildings in and around the Islamic University of Gaza.
- The sole power plant in Gaza ceased operations after running out of fuel because of Israel's blockade.
- The Israel Border Police shot two Palestinians in East Jerusalem.
- Hezbollah of Lebanon took responsibility for attacks made against IDF forces with "precision missiles".

=== 12 October ===
- US military equipment arrived at Nevatim Airbase, and the USS Gerald Ford strike group arrived in the eastern Mediterranean.
- The IAF attacked more than 200 targets in Gaza.
- The IDF carried out artillery strikes in Syria after a number of mortars were launched toward northern Israel.
- Israel announced that Gaza would not receive water, fuel, or electricity until the hostages were freed.
- Israel confirmed the bombing of Damascus and Aleppo International Airports in Syria.
- Following the shutdown of the Gaza Strip power station the previous day, it was reported that hospitals in Gaza would soon run out of available fuel to power generators.

=== 13 October ===
- Tensions are reportedly high in East Jerusalem and the occupied West Bank. Israel refused entry to Palestinians younger than 60 who came for Friday noon prayer at al-Aqsa Mosque. Israeli forces have killed at least 35 Palestinians in the West Bank since 7 October, authorities said.
- In an update on the ongoing Gaza-Israel hostilities, OCHA reported 1300 fatalities in Israel according to Israeli official sources and 1900 in Gaza according to the Palestinian Ministry of Health.
- Hamas told Gazans in the northern region (some 1.1 million people) to remain in place.
- 16 Palestinians have been killed by Israeli forces in the West Bank, for a total of 51 since 7 October, according to the Palestinian health ministry.
- The IDF launched localized raids on Hamas cells.
- An evacuation route on Salah al-Din street was bombed; the Gaza health ministry claimed 70 dead.

=== 14 October ===
- Updating the ongoing Gaza-Israel hostilities, OCHA reported 1300 fatalities in Israel according to Israeli official sources and 2228 in Gaza plus 54 fatalities in the West Bank, according to the Palestinian Ministry of Health since 7 October. Tensions continued to rise in the West Bank and UN monitors said it was the deadliest week since 2005 for Palestinians.
- The US authorized the departure of non-emergency personnel from its embassy in Jerusalem.
- The IAF bombed a building in southern Khan Yunis.
- Red Crescent ambulances in Gaza were struck by the IAF.
- Israel said that the war could take months. A record number of 360,000 reservists had reported for duty.
- UNRWA announced on Twitter that its shelters were no longer safe, deeming it an unprecedented situation. It also said water was running out.
- According to a statement by the Archbishop of Canterbury, Justin Welby, a rocket damaged the upper two floors of the Al-Ahli Arab Hospital cancer treatment center, which contained the ultrasound and mammography wards, and injured four staff members.
- Red Crescent ambulances in Gaza were struck by the IAF.

=== 15 October ===
- Israel Border Police arrested more than 50 Palestinians in the occupied West Bank according to the Palestinian news agency Wafa. Minor clashes between Hezbollah and the IDF continued in and around the Shebaa Farms and elsewhere at the Lebanon–Israel border.
- Israel informed US National Security Advisor Jake Sullivan that water pipes had been turned back on in southern Gaza.
- The Egyptian Red Crescent, WHO, and other NGOs and volunteer groups began stockpiling humanitarian supplies at Rafah Crossing.
- UNRWA chief Philippe Lazzarini noted that Gaza's supply of clean drinking water was running out, stating at a press conference that Gaza "was running out of life".
- Four Gazan hospitals were rendered inoperable while the IDF demanded that 21 hospitals in northern Gaza evacuate according to the WHO.
- The Committee to Protect Journalists said at least 12 journalists had been killed and eight wounded to date, while two others were missing. They variously free-lanced or worked for Agence France-Press, Ain Media, Al-Aqsa Radio, Al-Ghad, Al-Jazeera, Al-Khamsa News, Fourth Authority News Agency, Khabar Agency, Israel Hayom, Sky News Arabia, Reuters, Sowt Al-Asra Radio (Radio Voice of the Prisoners, and Smart Media.
- Healthcare professionals were reportedly worried that if hospital facilities' generators stopped, patients would die when the power was lost.
- WHO described Israel's evacuation order as a "death sentence" for the sick and wounded.

=== 16 October ===
- The World Health Organization stated there were only "24 hours of water, electricity and fuel left" before "a real catastrophe" in the Gaza strip.
- Hamas released its first video of a hostage (an Israeli). Abu Obeida, the spokesperson for the military wing of Hamas, claimed that the group was holding ~200 hostages, with "dozens" in the hands of various factions.
- Israel attacked the Rafah border crossing.
- Israeli Minister without portfolio Gideon Sa'ar stated that "Gaza must be smaller at the end of the war".
- Doctors Without Borders president Christos Christou wrote that the situation in Gaza was "horrific and catastrophic… No electricity, no medical supplies. Surgeons in Al-Shifa hospital are now operating without painkillers."

=== 17 October ===
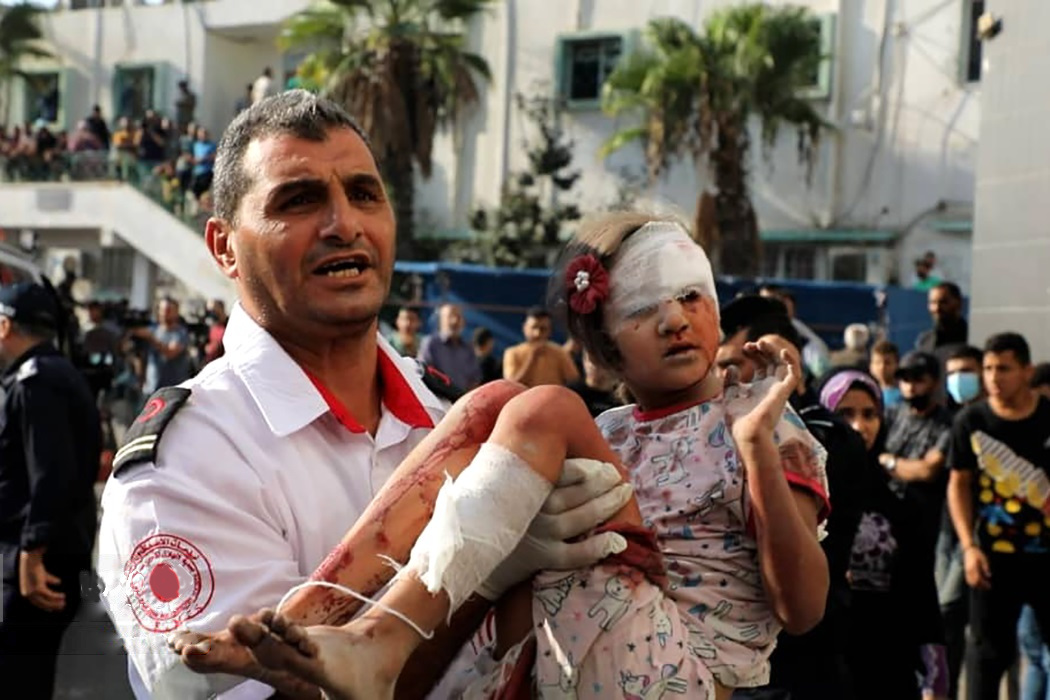
Medic carrying wounded Palestinian child in Gaza

The Al-Ahli Arab Hospital explosion killed hundreds of Palestinians taking refuge at a hospital. Israel said the explosion was caused by an errant Palestinian missile. An Islamic Jihad spokesman denied responsibility.

Updating the ongoing Gaza-Israel hostilities, OCHA reported 1300 fatalities in Israel according to Israeli official sources and 3000 in Gaza plus 61 fatalities in the West Bank, according to the Palestinian Ministry of Health since 7 October.

=== 18 October ===
- Brazil drafted a UN resolution asking the involved countries to initiate "humanitarian pauses" in the conflict, so to facilitate the delivery of aid to Gazan civilians. Russian abstained from the vote because the text did not call for a more permanent ceasefire, and the US vetoed it because "[the] resolution did not mention Israel's right of self-defence". The resolution differed from an earlier Russian draft by also condemning Hamas's actions against civilians.
- The World Health Organization stated the situation in Gaza was "spiralling out of control."
- President Biden arrived in Tel Aviv, but a planned summit in Amman, Jordan with Jordanian, Egyptian, and Fatah leaders was cancelled due to the al-Ahli hospital bombing. He expressed support for Israel and for the "legitimate aspirations of the Palestinian people", but did not call for a ceasefire.
- Amid clashes all over the West bank, Palestinian health authorities said that 13 Palestinians, including five children, were killed in clashes in Nur Shams while the Israeli military reported one of its officers killed. A spokesperson for U.N. human rights chief Volker Türk said "We are extremely alarmed by the rapidly deteriorating human rights situation in the occupied West Bank and the increase in unlawful use of lethal force."

=== 19 October ===
- Updating the ongoing Gaza-Israel hostilities, OCHA reported 1400 fatalities in Israel according to Israeli official sources and 3785 in Gaza plus 79 fatalities in the West Bank, according to the Palestinian Ministry of Health since 7 October.
- Amid clashes all over the West bank, Palestinian health authorities said that 13 Palestinians, including five children, were killed in clashes in Nur Shams while the Israeli military reported one of its officers killed. A spokesperson for U.N. human rights chief Volker Türk said "We are extremely alarmed by the rapidly deteriorating human rights situation in the occupied West Bank and the increase in unlawful use of lethal force."
- The campus of the Greek Orthodox St. Porphyrius Church in Gaza was struck by the IAF.
- The US State Department issued a rare world-wide alert advising American citizens "to exercise increased caution".
- The IAF bombed around 100 targets in multiple airstrikes over the night of 18–19 October.
- Biden delivered his second Oval Office speech, calling the conflict "an inflection point in history", and tying it with the 2022 Russian Invasion of Ukraine.
- Airstrikes hit the area around al-Quds Hospital.
- The Gaza Health Ministry asked for donations of liters of fuels to continue powering hospital generators.
- Gaza's only cancer hospital announced it had "perilously low" levels of remaining fuel.
- Doctors stated pediatric patients had developed gastroenteritis infections due to the lack of clean water.
- The Red Cross stated Gaza's entire health system was "on its knees".

=== 20 October ===
- Two UNRWA workers were killed in Gaza.
- Doctors Without Borders stated thousands of people were at risk of dying "within hours" because it was "impossible" to give them medical attention.

=== 21 October ===
- OCHA reported 1400 fatalities in Israel according to Israeli official sources and 4385 in Gaza plus 84 fatalities in the West Bank, according to the Palestinian Ministry of Health, since 7 October.
- Hamas released two hostages to the International Red Cross: namely American-Israeli mother and daughter Judith and Natalie Raanan; Their release followed mediation by Qatar.
- Protests broke out in the West Bank in support of Gaza. Footage showed protesters flying the flags of Fatah and Russia, and holding portraits of Russian president Vladimir Putin, and North Korean leader Kim Jong Un.
- Israel's National Security Council told its citizens to leave Lebanon and Egypt "as soon as possible".

=== 22 October ===
- On 22 October, the IDF raided Qabatiya and Tammun, and conducted the Al-Ansar Mosque airstrike in Jenin.
- Israel conducted an airstrike on the Al-Ansar Mosque in Jenin in the occupied West Bank, killing two and injuring three.
- UNRWA announced it would run out of fuel within three days, resulting in "no water, no functioning hospitals and bakeries".
- 14 more Israeli communities were evacuated near the border with Lebanon due to continuing clashes.
- The People's Liberation Army of China deployed six warships to the Middle East.
- A UN statement signed by UNDP, UNFPA, UNICEF, WFP and WHO stated deaths could soon "skyrocket" from disease and "lack of healthcare".

=== 23 October ===
- OCHA reported 1400 fatalities in Israel according to Israeli official sources and 5087 in Gaza according to the Gaza Ministry of Health plus 95 fatalities in the West Bank, since 7 October.
- Daraghmeh, a Hamas official, died in an Israeli prison in what Hamas claimed to be an assassination. He had been arrested in the West Bank by the IDF on October 9, along with his son.
- The Qassam and Al-Quds Brigades announced they had attacked IDF positions near Erez with rockets, mortars and drones, at around 4:30 PM local time.
- Hamas released two more hostages to the Red Cross, both elderly female Israelis, following mediation by Egypt and Qatar. Their husbands remained in captivity.
- On 23 October, the Indonesia Hospital ran out of fuel and completely lost power.
- A Health Ministry spokesman announced the healthcare system had "totally collapsed", with 65 medics killed, 25 ambulances destroyed, and many hospitals soon shutting down due to lack of fuel.
- The World Health Organization warned 46 of Gaza's 72 healthcare facilities had stopped functioning.

==== 24 October ====
- At a press conference, one of the released Hamas hostages, 85-year old Yocheved Lifshitz, said that she "went through hell", but that she was treated well in captivity. She said the hostages in her group walked through kilometers of tunnels; she was eventually sequestered with several others under sanitary albeit spartan conditions with medical care and sustenance.

=== 25 October ===
- OCHA reported ~1400 fatalities in Israel according to Israeli official sources and 6547 in Gaza according to the Gaza Ministry of Health plus 102 fatalities in the West Bank, since 7 October. There were two Israeli fatalities, one in each of Gaza and the West Bank.
- The family of Al-Jazeera journalist Wael Al-Dahdouh was killed in an Israeli airstrike in Gaza.
- Turkish President Recep Tayyip Erdogan said in a speech that "Hamas is not a terrorist organization, but a "mujahideen liberation group struggling to protect its people and lands."
- The Health Ministry stated a total of 7,000 sick and wounded hospital patients were facing death.
- The Al-Aqsa Martyrs Hospital faced a dialysis crisis, with hundreds sharing only 24 dialysis machines.

=== 27 October ===
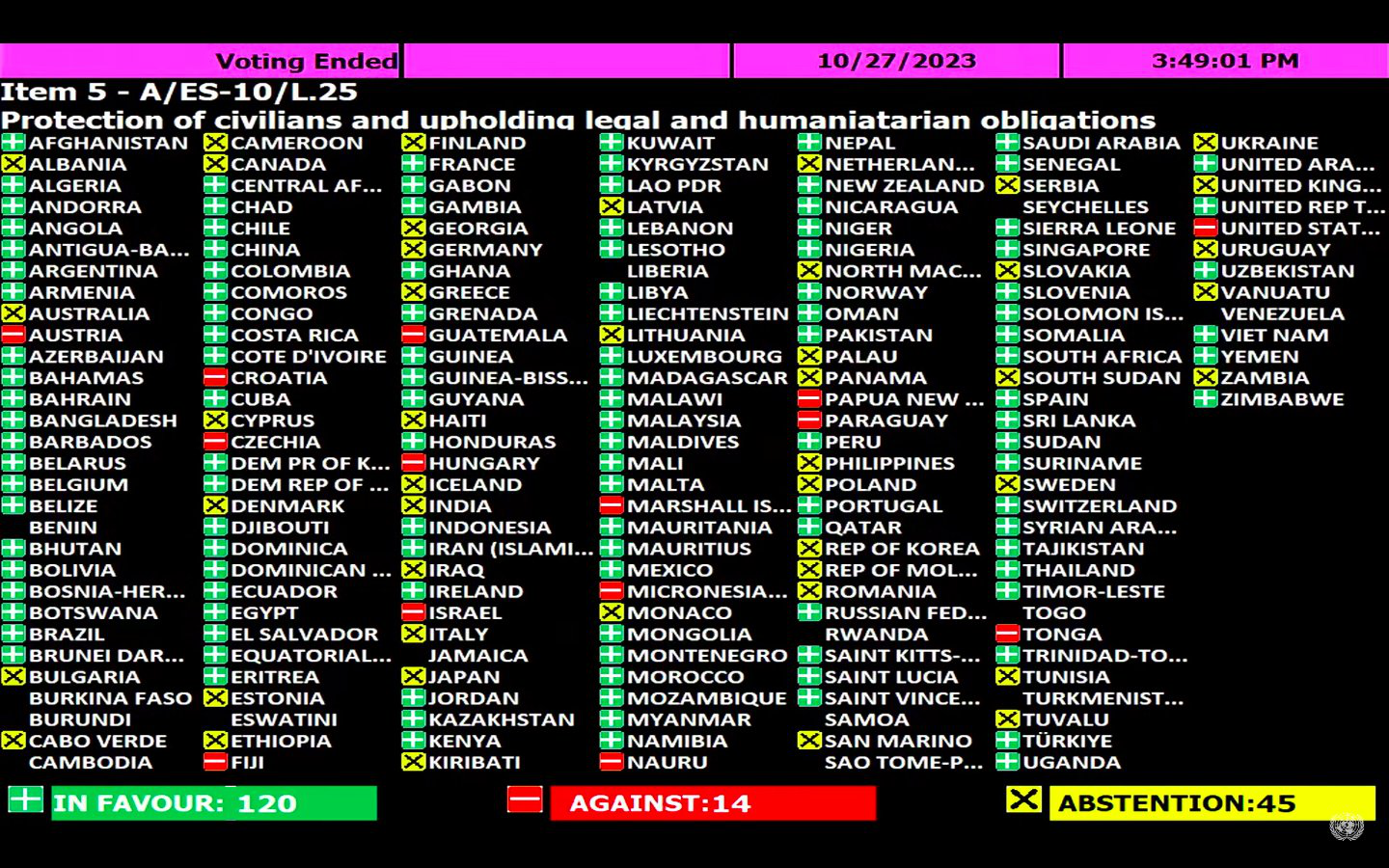
On 27 October, the United Nations General Assembly passed Resolution ES-10/21 calling for an "immediate and sustained" humanitarian truce and cessation of hostilities.

- OCHA reported ~1400 fatalities in Israel according to Israeli official sources and 7326 in Gaza according to the Gaza Ministry of Health plus 108 fatalities in the West Bank, since 7 October. There were two Israeli fatalities, one in each of Gaza and the West Bank.
- Gaza suffered a complete communications blackout. ActionAid stated it was "nearly impossible" for people to call or receive emergency services.
- Hamas launched rockets from Gaza that hit apartment blocks in Tel Aviv.
- Israel conducted a heavy round of airstrikes and said that it was "expanding its ground forces" in besieged Gaza. Several of these air strikes reportedly hit near the vicinity of both al-Shifa Hospital and the Indonesia Hospital.

=== 28 October ===
- Israel conducted a heavy round of airstrikes and said that it was "expanding its ground forces" in besieged Gaza. Several of these air strikes reportedly hit near the vicinity of both al-Shifa Hospital and the Indonesia Hospital.

=== 29 October ===
- An Israeli airstrike struck 20 metres (65 feet) from al-Quds hospital.
- (Dr.) Ghassan Abu Sitta mentioned that he was increasingly treating patients with "distinctive phosphorus burns."

=== 30 October ===
- OCHA reported ~1400 fatalities in Israel according to Israeli official sources and 8309 in Gaza according to the Gaza Ministry of Health plus 121 fatalities in the West Bank, since 7 October. There were two Israeli fatalities, one in each of Gaza and the West Bank.
- The Turkish-Palestinian Friendship Hospital was severely damaged by an Israeli airstrike.
- WHO announced it could no longer resupply al-Shifa and al-Quds hospitals due to the high levels of risk.
- Israel attacked the immediate surroundings of the Indonesian Hospital in Beit Lahia.

=== 31 October ===
- The Jabalia refugee camp, which has been the target of multiple Israeli air strikes during the 2023 Gaza war, was struck again on 31 October, killing at least 50 Palestinians and trapping more than a hundred beneath the rubble, according to the Gaza Health Ministry.
- In late October, Save the Children, an international nonprofit organization, released a report stating that the amount of children who lost their lives in the Gaza Strip during three weeks of Israel's bombardment had exceeded the yearly number of children killed in conflicts worldwide each year since 2019.
- In October 2023, a higher number of children lost their lives in Gaza compared to the combined total of children killed in other conflicts annually since 2019. This alarming statistic prompted United Nations Secretary General António Guterres to refer to Gaza as a "graveyard for children."
- The Palestinian Health Ministry issued a last warning before the shutdown of the main electrical generator in the Al-Shifa Medical Complex, stating that there are only a few hours left before going out of service.

== November ==
=== 1 November ===
- OCHA reported ~1400 fatalities in Israel according to Israeli official sources and 8805 in Gaza according to the Gaza Ministry of Health plus 128 fatalities in the West Bank, since 7 October. There were 15 Israeli fatalities, 15 in Gaza and one in the West Bank.
- The director of the Turkish-Palestinian Friendship Hospital stated Gaza's only cancer hospital was "completely out of service" after it ran out of fuel to power its generator.

=== 2 November ===
On the morning of 2 November 2023, during the Gaza war, unknown Palestinian assailants, called terrorists by the Hebrew YNet news, overtook an Israeli vehicle near Beit Lid in the occupied West Bank and shot at the driver, an Israeli settler in IDF uniform. As a result of the shooting, the vehicle overturned and the driver was mortally wounded and later died.

- The World Health Organization (WHO) has verified 237 incidents targeting healthcare facilities, which clearly contravenes international humanitarian law.

=== 3 November ===
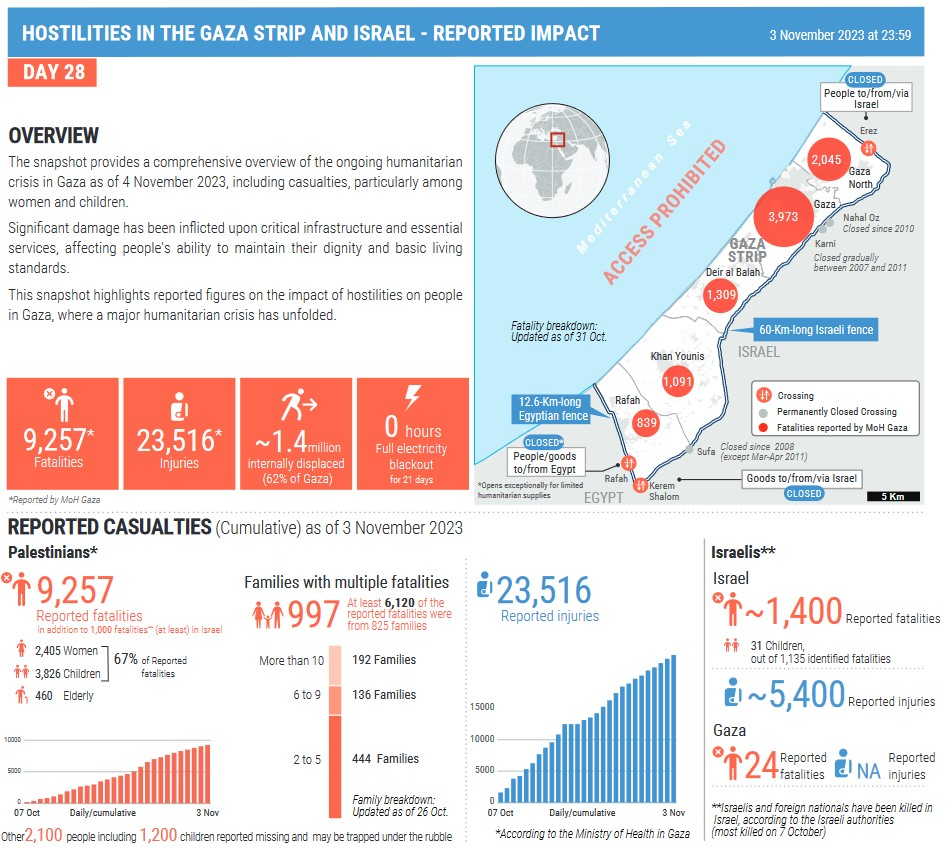
OCHA Palestinian and Israeli fatalities during Israel Gaza war of 2023

The Office of the U.N. High Commissioner for Human Rights said "While much attention has been on the (Hamas) attacks inside Israel and the escalation of hostilities in Gaza since the 7th of October, the situation in the occupied West Bank, including East Jerusalem, is alarming and urgent". She said at least 132 Palestinians, including 41 children, have been were killed in the West Bank, 124 of those by Israeli forces and some eight by Israeli settlers, since 7 October while 2 Israeli soldiers were killed. Israeli forces have killed at least 10 Palestinians in overnight raids and clashes.

OCHA reported ~1400 fatalities in Israel according to Israeli official sources and 9257 in Gaza according to the Gaza Ministry of Health plus 135 fatalities in the West Bank, since 7 October. There were 26 Israeli fatalities, 24 in Gaza and two in the West Bank.

The Islamic Resistance in Iraq has declared that it has attacked the city of Eilat, located to the south of occupied Palestine, in retaliation for the Israeli occupation in Gaza. The organization confirmed that its militants attacked a location in Umm Al-Rashrash in Eilat on Friday morning, emphasizing their intention to persist in targeting enemy positions.

According to the Ministry of Health data as of 3 November, the Gaza strip has witnessed the tragic loss of 2326 women and 3760 children, accounting for 67% of the total casualties. Additionally, numerous others have suffered injuries in this devastating situation.

The Ministry stated 800 critically wounded patients needed to leave Gaza to receive care, stating many critically wounded patients had died in the past several days due to the collapsed healthcare system.

A medical convoy in front of al-Shifa hospital was destroyed by an Israeli drone missile.

Al-Quds and Indonesia Hospital were both hit by airstrikes.

=== 4 November ===
On 4 December, Red Cross president Mirjana Spoljaric Egger visited the Gaza Strip, stating, "The things I saw there are beyond anything that anyone should be in a position to describe."

The entrance of the al-Nasser Children's Hospital was hit by an Israeli strike.

=== 6 November ===
Between 5 November (noon) and 6 November (14:00), 252 Palestinians were killed in Gaza, according to the Ministry of Health (MoH) in Gaza. On 6 November, one Israeli soldier was reportedly killed in Gaza. Since 7 October, there have been 10,000 Palestinian fatalities, including 4,008 children and 2,550 women, per the MoH in Gaza. ~2,260 others are reported missing, including 1,270 children. 30 Israeli soldiers have been killed according to Israeli sources. In the West bank, 147 Palestinians, including 44 children, have been killed by Israeli forces and a further eight, including one child, have been killed by Israeli settlers. Three Israelis have been killed by Palestinians.

One Israel Border Police officer, Rose Ida Lubin, was murdered and another was wounded at Jerusalem's Herod's Gate in a stabbing attack by a 16-year-old from Issawiya.

Israeli ground forces advanced towards the Indonesian Sheikh Hamad Hospital.

=== 8 November ===
Al-Quds Hospital stated Israel had destroyed all roads leading to the hospital.

=== 9 November ===
Israeli forces killed 15 Palestinians during a raid on Jenin.

Between 8 November (14:00) and 9 November (14:00), 243 Palestinians were killed in Gaza, according to the Ministry of Health (MoH) in Gaza. Fatalities since 7 October are 10,818 per the Gaza MoH. About 2,650 others are missing. Two Israeli soldiers were killed (35 since 7 October) per Israeli sources. In the West Bank, Israeli forces killed 18 Palestinians between the afternoon of 8 November and noontime on 9 November (Since 7 October, 167 Palestinians have been killed by Israeli forces and three Israelis have been killed in attacks by Palestinians).

Secretary of State Antony Blinken said any plan for Gaza "must include Palestinian-led governance and Gaza unified with the West Bank under the Palestinian Authority".

The Gaza government media office stated Israel had bombed eight hospitals in the past three days.

The Islamic Resistance in Iraq has taken credit for the majority of the attacks, announcing their claims on a Telegram channel known as Iraq Flood ("Tufan al-Iraq" in Arabic). The primary targets of these attacks have been the Ain al-Asad military base in Anbar province, the Harir airbase near Erbil in the semi-autonomous Kurdistan region, as well as the Conoco gas field and al-Tanf base in neighboring Syria.

=== 10 November ===
- The International Red Cross stated Gaza's healthcare system had "reached a point of no return."
- Israeli tanks surrounded four hospitals, al-Rantisi Hospital, al-Nasr Hospital, and the eye and mental health hospitals, from all directions.
- The Nasser Rantissi paediatric cancer hospital caught on fire after being hit by an Israeli airstrike and began evacuations.
- At least three hospitals were hit by Israeli airstrikes, resulting in multiple casualties. This led to the director of the Al-Shifa hospital to state, "Israel is now launching a war on Gaza City hospitals."
- The Interior Ministry stated Al-Shifa Hospital was bombed five times in 24 hours.
- The Palestinian Red Crescent stated Israeli snipers opened fire on children at al-Quds hospital, killing one and wounding 28.
- The Ministry of Health stated Israel cut off Indonesia Hospital's electricity, water, and communication.

=== 12 November ===
- The Ministry of Health (MoH) in Gaza has not updated casualty figures since 10 November when the number of fatalities stood at 11,078. The number of Israeli soldiers killed since ground operations began is 47. In the West Bank, since 7 October, Israeli forces have killed 172 Palestinians and Israeli settlers killed an additional eight while three Israelis have been killed in attacks by Palestinians.
- The director general of al-Shifa stated the lives of 650 patients were in danger at al-Shifa Hospital due to the "catastrophic situation."
- Two of Gaza's main hospitals, Al-Shifa and Al-Quds, closed down.

=== 13 November ===
- Doctors Without Borders released a statement describing the situation at Al-Shifa Hospital, stating they had no food, water, or electricity, and that there was a sniper attacking patients. The statement stated, "The situation is very bad, it is inhuman."
- 30 organizations, including Amnesty International, the Evangelical Lutheran Church, and Oxfam, signed an open letter to the Biden administration, urging them not to transfer 155mm artillery shells to Israel. The letter noted international humanitarian law requires a distinction between civilian and military personnel, but that in Gaza, "one of the world's most densely populated places, 155mm artillery shells are inherently indiscriminate".

=== 14 November ===
- Israel launched a raid on al-Shifa Hospital, where thousands, including three dozen premature babies, were still sheltering.
- Doctors reported 40 patients at al-Shifa died.
- Fighting near Al-Quds Hospital halted evacuation efforts.

=== 16 November ===
- The Indonesia Hospital completely shut down, leaving 45 patients in need of surgery.

=== 17 November ===
- The Palestinian Red Crescent stated its emergency medical teams were trapped at Al-Ahli Hospital.

=== 18 November ===
In the West Bank, Israeli forces killed 198 Palestinians and Israeli settlers eight more, since 7 October, while four Israelis have been killed by Palestinians. The number of all Palestinian fatalities in the West Bank in 2023 is 439. MoH Gaza continues not to update casualty figures

Following his condemnation of settler violence on 25 October, US President Joe Biden said that the US was ready to issue visa bans on extremist Israeli settlers.

As of 18 November, around 13,000 people have been killed in the Gaza Strip since 7 October, according to the Palestinian Central Bureau of Statistics, almost three quarters reportedly children, women and elderly.

An evacuation of al-Shifa began.

=== 20 November ===
- 201 Palestinians have been killed by Israeli forces in the West bank since 7 October and eight more by Israeli settlers. Four Israelis have been killed in attacks by Palestinians.
- Israel launched an offensive on Indonesia Hospital with an airstrike that reportedly killed 12 people.
- Following the strike, Israeli tanks surrounded the hospital.
- Staff at the hospital reported Israeli soldiers shooting inside the hospital indiscriminately.
- The Gaza Ministry of Health mentioned that 200 patients were evacuated from the hospital, while an estimated 500 patients remained.

=== 21 November ===
- The World Health Organization stated three hospitals in northern Gaza would be evacuated, meaning there would be no functioning hospitals left in northern Gaza.
- Four doctors were reported killed after Israel bombed al-Awda Hospital.

=== 22 November ===
- The Palestinian Red Crescent said 14 ambulances had arrived at al-Shifa to evacuate the hospital's remaining patients.
- The Kamal Adwan hospital stated Israeli bombings increased around the hospital.

=== 23 November ===
- The head of the Medical Emergency Rescue Committee stated patients and staff at the Indonesia Hospital were evacuated to the European Hospital in Khan Younis.

=== 24 November ===
- Hospitals in northern Gaza, including al-Ahli Arab Hospital, were evacuated by the World Health Organization and the Red Cross.

=== 25 November ===
- Since the start of the ongoing war, as of 18:00 on 23 November, according to the Government Media Office in Gaza, more than 14,800 people have been killed in Gaza, including about 6,000 children and 4,000 women and as of 18:00 on 25 November, according to official Israeli sources, 75 Israeli soldiers have been killed. In the West Bank, Israeli forces have killed 215 Palestinians and Israeli settlers an additional eight while Palestinians have killed four Israelis.
- The director general of the Ministry of Health stated the Israeli military shot at medical teams during the temporary ceasefire in effect.
- UNOCHA stated only four small hospitals in northern Gaza and eight health facilities in southern Gaza were still functioning.

=== 30 November ===
- Two Palestinian gunmen from Sur Baher killed three and wounded 11 Israelis at a bus stop on the Givat Shaul Interchange in Jerusalem.
- WHO chief Tedros Adhanom Ghebreyesus stated the health needs of Gaza had increased dramatically, though only one-third of its health facilities were functioning.
- The Health Ministry stated hundreds needed to be evacuated from Gaza to receive medical care.

== December ==
=== 1 December ===
- Hospitals reported overcrowding, with doctors forced to treat patients on the floor.
- Doctors Without Borders stated al-Awda hospital had been damaged in an Israeli bombing.

=== 3 December ===
- In Gaza, 15,523 Palestinians have been killed according to the Gaza MoH while 77 Israeli soldiers have been killed according to official Israeli sources. In the West Bank, 244 Palestinians have been killed which is more than half of all Palestinians killed in the West Bank in 2023, while eight Israelis, including three members of Israeli forces, have been killed.
- James Elder, a spokesman for UNICEF described Nasser Hospital in Khan Younis as a "death zone."
- The IDF bombed the Kamal Adwan hospital, killing at least four people.
- Two Red Crescent paramedics were wounded by gunfire from the Israeli military.

=== 4 December ===
- On 4 December, the Lower Aqueduct plan for 1792 housing units was approved in an expedited process, marking the first major new East Jerusalem settlement plan in East Jerusalem since Givat HaMatos in 2012.
- Doctors Without Borders stated hospitals in southern Gaza were overflowing with wounded patients.
- Red Cross president Mirjana Spoljaric Egger visited the Gaza Strip, stating, "The things I saw there are beyond anything that anyone should be in a position to describe."

=== 5 December ===
- Following repeated US requests for accountability in respect of Israeli settler violence, US Secretary of State Antony Blinken announced visa restrictions would be imposed on individuals contributing to "undermining peace, security, or stability in the West Bank" the policy will apply to both Israelis and Palestinians who are responsible for attacks in the West Bank.
- Attacks in the vicinity of Kamal Adwan Hospital were reported.
- Doctors at the Al-Aqsa Hospital stated they could not handle the overflow of patients they were experiencing.

=== 6 December ===
- Doctors Without Borders stated fuel and medical supplies at al-Aqsa hospital were critically low.
- Doctors in south Gaza reported a lack of beds and supplies.

=== 7 December ===
- The Palestinian Red Crescent stated 60 percent of the wounded in Gaza required urgent medical treatment abroad, and that ambulance service in northern Gaza had completely ceased.
- WHO chief Tedros Adhanom Ghebreyesus stated fighting in southern Gaza was making it increasingly difficult to run health operations.

=== 8 December ===
- Israeli forces conducted a raid in the Far'a refugee camp in the West Bank, aiming to arrest suspected Palestinian militants. The operation resulted in clashes with local gunmen, leading to the deaths of six Palestinians, including a 14-year-old boy and a local commander of the Al Aqsa Martyrs' Brigade, according to the Palestinian Health Ministry. The Israeli military did not provide a comment on the operation.
- An estimated 286 health workers in Gaza had been killed by Israel.

=== 9 December ===
- WHO stated two health staff had been shot and killed by the IDF at Al Awda Hospital, besieged since 5 December.
- The director of the European Hospital stated the situation was catastrophic, with paramedics wounded in Israeli airstrikes.

=== 10 December ===
- OCHA updated its estimated death toll in Gaza since 7 October, to 18,000 Palestinians and 98 Israeli soldiers; and in the West Bank, to 265 Palestinians killed, including two involved in an attack in Israel on 30 November. Additionally, four Israelis, three of whom were security force members, were killed in Palestinian attacks in the West Bank, and four more in West Jerusalem, one by friendly fire. Israeli forces apprehended over 3,760 Palestinians in the West Bank since 7 October.
- Bushra Khalidi, an expert with Oxfam, stated the situation was no longer "just a catastrophe, it's apocalyptic."
- Doctors Without Borders stated that the Israeli army had forced them to evacuate the Martyrs and Beni Shueila clinics, and that healthcare had completely collapsed.
- The Ministry of Health stated 50,000 people had been wounded since the start of the conflict.

=== 11 December ===
- MSF stated one of its doctors inside Al Awda Hospital had been injured by an Israeli sniper.
- The director of Kamal Adwan Hospital stated Israel had killed two mothers and their newborn babies when Israel targeted its maternity ward. The UN confirmed the killings.

=== 12 December ===
- Doctors Without Borders said healthcare conditions in Gaza were akin to conditions during World War I.
- Israel raided the Kamal Adwan Hospital.
- In response, Tedros Adhanom Ghebreyesus stated WHO was extremely worried for Kamal Adwan's medical staff.
- Doctors at Nasser Medical Complex in Khan Younis described a lack of supplies and barely any medical functionality.

=== 14 December ===
- The Ministry of Health reported 2,500 internally displaced persons from Kamal Adwan had been forcibly evacuated, and that IDF soldiers had prevented medical staff from continuing support to 12 babies in intensive care and ten emergency department patients, leading to two deaths.

=== 16 December ===
- Journalists reported Israeli bulldozers had crushed people sheltering outside Kamal Adwan, with one reporter describing "a terrifying massacre and unspeakable scenes", and stating, "Dozens of displaced, sick and wounded people were buried alive".

=== 17 December ===
- Following a convoy visit to al-Shifa hospital, the World Health Organization released a statement describing the situation as a "bloodbath" with hundreds of injured patients inside laying on the floor.

=== 18 December ===
- The al-Ahli Arab Hospital was attacked, with displaced people forced out and two doctors arrested.

=== 19 December ===
- Doctors Without Borders reported Israeli troops seized Al-Awda Hospital, and that "males over 16 years old were taken out of the hospital, stripped, bound and interrogated", including several Doctors Without Borders staff.

=== 20 December ===
- The Palestinian Red Crescent Society stated Israeli troops had besieged its northern Gaza ambulance centre.
- The Red Crescent reported emergency and rescue teams were unable to reach the wounded.
- WHO secretary-general Tedros Adhanom Ghebreyesus reported the Al-Ahli Arab Hospital was out of service, stating, "That has left north Gaza with no functional hospital. Only four hospitals operate at a minimum level, providing very limited care".
- The Kuwaiti Hospital was overcrowded by large numbers of wounded patients following an airstrike in Rafah.

=== 22 December ===
- Intense shelling was reported near al-Amal Hospital in Khan Younis.
- The Palestinian Red Crescent stated Israel had destroyed all ambulance vehicles at its besieged centre, and that 47 men were stripped naked, beaten, and tortured.

=== 23 December ===
- The Palestinian Red Crescent stated the Israeli army was detaining eight emergency rescue teams.
- The head of pediatrics at Kamal Adwan Hospital reported the conditions of the IDF siege, stating, "The soldiers dug up the graves this morning and dragged the bodies with bulldozers, then crushed the bodies with the bulldozers. I have never seen such a thing before."

=== 24 December ===
- The director of the Nasser Medical Complex reported doctors were treating wounds caused by internationally prohibited weapons.

=== 25 December ===
- The Government Media Office stated that 23 hospitals were out of service, that the health system was in the "final stage" of collapse, and that 9,000 people had died due to a lack of medical services.
- The Gaza Health Ministry reported 800,000 people in northern Gaza had no access to healthcare.

=== 26 December ===
- The Palestinian Red Crescent Society headquarters in Khan Younis sustained serious damage after being hit by Israeli bombing. Several staff were injured.
- The Red Crescent lost contact with its emergency teams due to a communications blackout.
- Tedros Adhanom Ghebreyesus stated the healthcare system was under "unbearable strain", and that patients at Al-Aqsa Hospital would die while waiting for treatment.

=== 27 December ===
- An Israeli drone strike in the northern West Bank near Tulkarem killed six Palestinians during an overnight raid, according to Palestinian Authority health officials. The IDF confirmed a counter-terror raid in the Nur Shams refugee camp, where three wanted Palestinians were arrested, and a dozen weapons were seized. The military reported striking a group of Palestinian gunmen who threw explosives at troops, resulting in the deaths of six individuals. The Palestinian Red Crescent Society mentioned four additional people wounded, three seriously. Troops used bulldozers and military vehicles during the operation, leading to violent clashes in Tulkarem. The IDF also uncovered and destroyed explosive devices in the area.
- On the 27th of December, a spokesperson from MSF expressed, "This cannot be portrayed as a humanitarian response, as we are unable to ensure the safety of our teams." Mairav Zonszein, an analyst from Crisis Group, asserted that Israel's objective in the war is not to eliminate Hamas, but rather to eliminate the possibility of a livable environment in Gaza.
- Gaza suffered a complete communications blackout. ActionAid stated it was "nearly impossible" for people to call or receive emergency services.

=== 28 December ===
- An Israeli border security officer and a civilian security guard were moderately injured in a stabbing attack at a checkpoint between Jerusalem and the Gush Etzion settlement bloc in the West Bank. The alleged assailant, a 24-year-old East Jerusalem resident, was shot dead by security forces.
- The director of operations of the Gaza Health Ministry stated 1.6 million people in Rafah were in need of medical care and that international intervention was needed.

=== 29 December ===
- South Africa filed a case against Israel at the International Court of Justice, alleging that Israel's conduct in Gaza amounted to genocide.
- Five Israeli soldiers were wounded in a car-ramming attack near the Adorayim Junction in the southern West Bank. One soldier was seriously injured, while the other four were light-to-moderately wounded. The assailant was shot and killed by troops, identified as a Palestinian "youth" by WAFA, who reported that Israeli forces assaulted multiple Palestinian journalists, preventing them from covering the incident and confiscating their equipment and mobile devices.
- In a separate incident near Jerusalem, the IDF reported that its troops "neutralized" a Palestinian suspect who threw an explosive at a military post near the Palestinian town of Abu Dis. While the IDF didn't provide details on the suspect's condition, WAFA reported that a man in the area was shot dead by Israeli forces.
- The Gaza Government Media office stated 800,000 residents in northern Gaza had no access to hospitals, and that 7,000 people remained buried beneath rubble.
- The UN called the health system in Gaza "shattered" and said patients were just "waiting to die".

=== 30 December ===
- An Israeli soldier was seriously wounded in a car-ramming attack near the al-Fawwar refugee camp in the southern West Bank. The incident occurred close to the site of a previous car-ramming attack the day before. The IDF reported that the assailant had been "neutralized".
- An airstrike near European Hospital in Khan Younis killed five people.

== See also ==
- 2023 in Israel
- 2023 in the State of Palestine
- Timeline of the Gaza war
- Outline of the Gaza war
- Timeline of the Israeli–Palestinian conflict in 2024
