= 2022 Jerusalem bombings =

Palestinian attacks against Israeli civilians

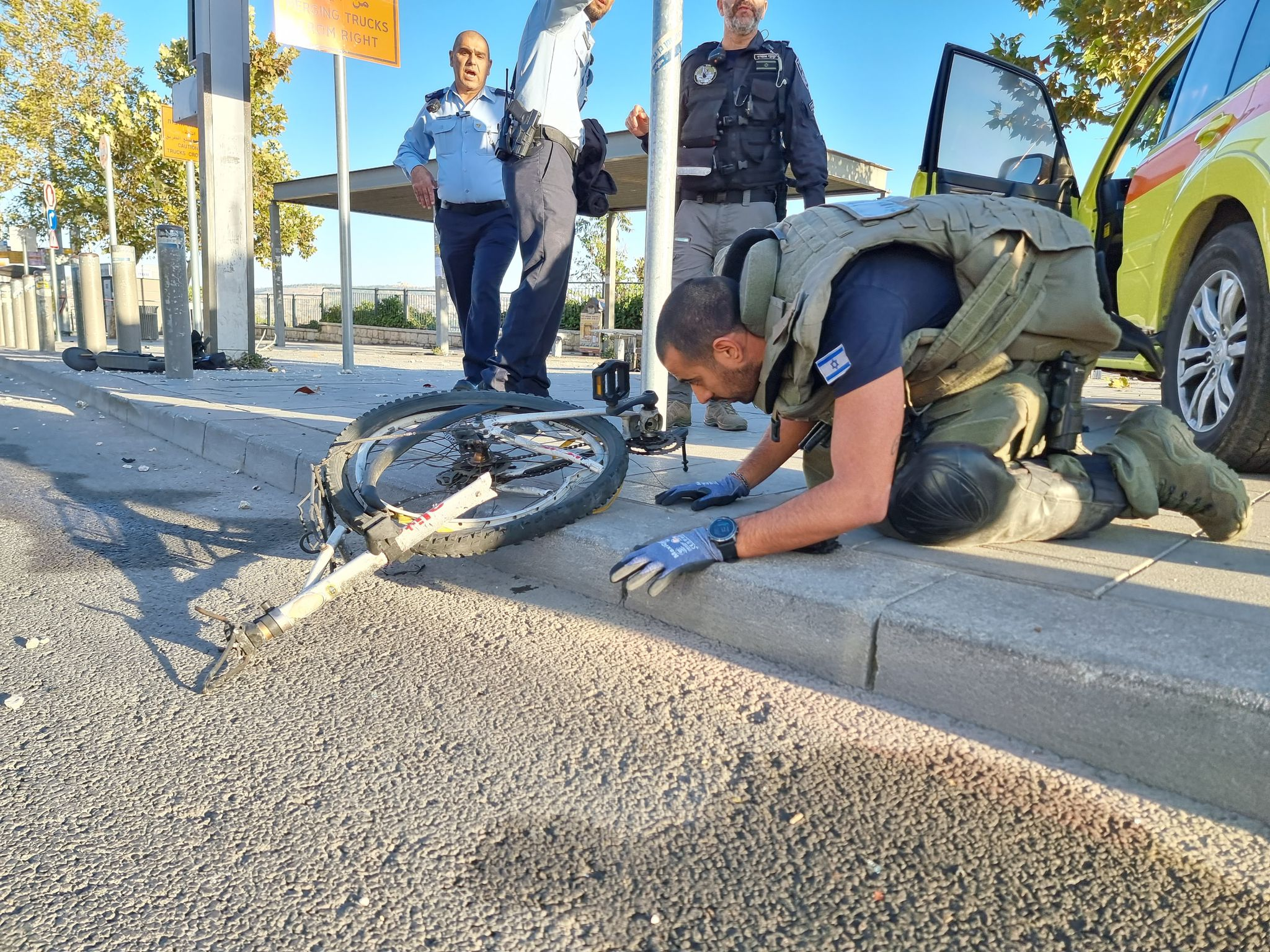
- The attack site
- Location: Jerusalem
- Date: 23 November 2022; 7:06 and 7:35 a.m.
- Attack type: IED bombing
- Deaths: 2 civilians
- Injuries: 46
- Assailant: Eslam Froukh
- Motive: Palestinian political violence

On 23 November 2022, two bomb attacks were carried out at bus stops on the outskirts of Jerusalem. Two civilians were killed and 46 were injured. They were the first bombings carried out on Israeli civilians since the 2016 Jerusalem bus bombing, in which a suicide bomber injured at least 22 people.

== Background ==
Tensions in the area have reportedly risen between Israelis and Palestinians over the past months leading up the explosions. A series of attacks from Palestinians reportedly killed nineteen Israelis in the spring of 2022, which had resulted in nightly raids throughout the West Bank. Additional attacks from Palestinians have reportedly increased in recent weeks. More than one hundred and thirty Palestinians have been killed in Israeli-Palestinian fighting this year, with most reported by Israeli forces as militants although some civilians have been also killed, and at least eight Israelis have been killed in recent violence. It was also reported that Palestinian militants had stormed a West Bank hospital and carried out an Israeli citizen receiving treatment after a car accident, hours before the explosions.

== Attack ==
On 23 November 2022, at 7:05 a.m., a bomb placed at a bus station near Jerusalem's main entrance, Givat Shaul, was detonated. Thirty minutes later, a second bomb placed at a bus stop near the Ramot junction east of Jerusalem was also detonated, lightly wounding five people and damaging a bus. A bus driver who arrived at the second bombing site said that the second bomb went off after he had stopped there to drop off his passengers. The bombs were concealed in bags and were packed with shrapnel.

== Victims ==
A 16-year-old Israeli-Canadian, Arye Schepoek, succumbed to his wounds at the Shaare Zedek Medical Center. An additional twenty-three people were injured; eighteen people were wounded in the first explosion and five people were wounded in the second explosion. On 26 November, a 50-year-old Ethiopian Jewish man named Tadasa Tashume Ben Ma'ada, who had sustained severe head injuries during the bombing, succumbed to his wounds.

== Perpetrators ==
Israeli authorities suspected that the attacks were carried out by Palestinian terrorists and coordinated by an organized cell. The explosives were high-quality and may were believed to have been detonated by mobile telephone.

In December 2022, Shin Bet and Israeli police announced that they had arrested 26-year-old Israeli Arab Eslam Froukh in Jerusalem. He is a mechanical engineer by training who resided between Ramallah and Kafr 'Aqab and is affiliated with the Islamic State. Froukh allegedly acted alone and constructed the bombs himself with the help of online guides. He had no prior record of terrorism activity. It is suspected that Froukh sought to detonate more explosives to commit a third attack but ran into technical issues. A number of additional suspects were arrested in the days after the incident, but were all released. In June 2023, the Ramallah home of Froukh was demolished by Israeli forces.

== Reactions ==
Hamas did not claim responsibility but praised the attacks, stating that the bombings "conveyed the message to the occupation by saying that our people will stand firm on their land and cling to the path of resistance". The bombings were also praised by the Palestinian Islamic Jihad, PFLP, and DFLP. Far-right lawmaker Itamar Ben-Gvir, who is expected to become the minister in charge of police under potential future Israeli Prime Minister Benjamin Netanyahu, called for a tougher stance from Israel on the attacks.

White House Press Secretary Karine Jean-Pierre stated that the Biden administration condemned the attack and that the United States had offered all appropriate assistance to the Israeli government to aid in the investigation. The US Embassy and EU Ambassador to Israel Dimiter Tzantchev have also condemned the violence.

== See also ==
- 2023 Givat Shaul shooting, a terrorist attack at the same bus stop in the next year
