= List of wars involving Palestinian militant groups =

As Palestinians have not had a fully recognized state with a regular army, much of Palestinian political violence in the context of the Israeli–Palestinian conflict has taken the form of insurgency. Common objectives of political violence by Palestinian groups include self-determination in or sovereignty over the region of Palestine, seeking a one-state solution, or the recognition of a Palestinian state. This includes the objective of ending the Israeli occupation. Goals also include the release of Palestinian prisoners held by Israel and recognition of the Palestinian right of return.

Palestinian groups that have been involved in politically motivated violence include the Palestine Liberation Organization (PLO), Fatah, the Popular Front for the Liberation of Palestine (PFLP), the Popular Front for the Liberation of Palestine – General Command (PFLP-GC), the Democratic Front for the Liberation of Palestine, the Abu Nidal Organization, the Palestinian Islamic Jihad, and Hamas. Several of these groups are considered terrorist organizations by the governments of the United States, Canada, the United Kingdom, Japan, New Zealand and the European Union.

Attacks have taken place both within Israel and Palestine as well as internationally. They have been directed at both military targets and civilians of many countries. Tactics have included hostage taking, plane hijacking, boat hijacking, stone throwing, improvised explosive device, knife attacks, shooting sprees, attacks with vehicles, car bombs and assassinations.

== List ==
Palestinian and allied victory
Another result (Note: A treaty or peace without a clear result, status quo ante bellum, result of civil or internal conflict, result unknown or indecisive, inconclusive.)
Palestinian and allied defeat
Ongoing conflict

War	Palestinians and allies	Opponents	Result
Wars involving the Arab groups in Mandatory Palestine (1920–1948)
Battle of Tel Hai	Syrian Arab Kingdom; Arab Shia militia	Yishuv	Victory: Arabs set fire to the village of Tel Hai.
Jaffa riots (May 1921)	Arab civilians of Manshiya	Yishuv: Palestine Communist Party; Ahdut HaAvoda; Zionist Commission; Haganah; Mandatory Palestine: Palestine Police Force	Inconclusive: Jewish civilians suffer 47 deaths and 146 injuries.; Arab civilians suffer 48 deaths and 73 injuries.; Haycraft Commission published a report which angered both Jews and Arabs.
1936–1939 Arab revolt in Palestine	Arab Higher Committee: Local rebel factions (fasa'il); Volunteers from the Arab World; Central Committee of National Jihad in Palestine; Bureau of the Arab Revolt in Palestine; Society for the Defense of Palestine	United Kingdom: British Army; Palestine Police Force; Jewish Settlement Police; Jewish Supernumerary Police; Special Night Squads; National Defense Party; Arab "peace bands" Yishuv: Jewish National Council; Haganah; Fosh; Peulot Meyuhadot; Irgun	Revolt suppressed: Issuance of the White Paper of 1939.
1948 Palestine war (1947–1948) Part of the intercommunal conflict in Mandatory Palestine, the Arab–Israeli conflict, and the Israeli–Palestinian conflict Location: Mandatory Palestine, Sinai Peninsula and southern Lebanon Haganah personnel carry a man wounded by Egyptian bombing.	Arab Higher Committee (before 15 May 1948); Arab League (after 15 May 1948): Arab League: Egypt; All-Palestine Protectorate (after 22 September 1948); Transjordan; Syria; Iraq; Lebanon; Saudi Arabia; Yemen; Irregulars: Al-Najjada; Holy War Army; Arab Liberation Army; Muslim Brotherhood	Yishuv (before 14 May 1948); Israel (after 14 May 1948) Before 26 May 1948: Haganah; Palmach; Hish; HIM; Irgun; Lehi; Druze militants; Allied Bedouin tribes; After 26 May 1948: Israel Defense Forces; Sword Battalion; Foreign volunteers: Mahal; United Kingdom; Mandatory Palestine (before 15 May 1948)	Defeat: Hundreds of thousands of Arabs flee or are expelled to the Gaza Strip, the West Bank and surrounding Arab states, forming the start of the Palestinian refugee crisis.; Beginning of the Palestinian Fedayeen insurgency.; Establishment of the State of Israel.; Hundreds of thousands of Jews flee or are expelled from Arab countries, largely settling in Israel.; Arab League boycott of Israel.; 1949 Armistice Agreements signed.; Annexation of the West Bank by Transjordan (including East Jerusalem).; Occupation of the Gaza Strip by Egypt and establishment of the All-Palestine Government.; Syrian foothold established to the north and south of the Sea of Galilee.
Wars involving Palestinian militiant groups and organizations (1948–present) (Note: Including the Palestine Liberation Organization, State of Palestine and the Palestinian Authority.)
Palestinian Fedayeen insurgency (1949–1956) Part of the Israeli–Palestinian conflict and the Arab–Israeli conflict Location: All-Palestine Protectorate, West Bank and Israel Five fedayeen killed near Nir Galim, 1956	Palestinian Fedayeen; Supported by: All-Palestine Protectorate; Kingdom of Egypt (until 1953); Republic of Egypt (from 1953); Syria; Jordan	Israel	Inconclusive: Outbreak of the Suez Crisis.
Gazan insurgency (1967–1971) Part of the Israeli–Palestinian conflict and the Gaza–Israel conflict Location: Gaza Strip and Israel Mass arrests of Palestinians.	(Palestine) Palestinian militant groups: Popular Front for the Liberation of Palestine	Israel	Defeat: Palestinian militant groups became increasingly fragmented and ineffective.; The IDF demolished around 2,000 homes with bulldozers as well as displaced nearly 16,000 people in Rafah Camp and other refugee camps across the Gaza Strip.
Palestinian insurgency in South Lebanon	Palestine Liberation Organization; Syria; Lebanese National Movement; Lebanese National Resistance Front; Supported by: Soviet Union	Israel; South Lebanon Army; Lebanese Forces	Defeat: Expulsion of the Palestine Liberation Organization from Lebanese territory to Tunisia, after Israel's invasion of Lebanon in 1982.; Beginning of the South Lebanon conflict in 1985.
Battle of Karameh	Jordan; Palestine Liberation Organization; Fatah; PLA	Israel	Both sides claim victory: Destruction of Karameh camp; Israel fails to capture Yasser Arafat; Israeli withdrawal from Karameh; repulsed in other axes
Black September	PLO: Fatah; Popular Front for the Liberation of Palestine (PFLP); Democratic Front for the Liberation of Palestine (DFLP); Syria: Syrian Armed Forces; Palestine Liberation Army (PLA)	Jordan: Jordanian Armed Forces	Defeat: Syrian invasion repelled.; Palestinian militants expelled to Lebanon.; Formation of the Black September Organization.
Arab Cold War	Republic of Egypt (1953–1958); United Arab Republic (1958–1971); Arab Republic of Egypt (1971–1973); Iraqi Republic (1958–1968); Ba'athist Iraq (1968–1979, 1990−1991); Syrian Republic (1954–1958/1961); Ba'athist Syria (from 1963); Libya (after 1969); Algeria; Sudan (1969–1971); South Yemen; North Yemen (1962–1970, 1974–1978); Mauritania (until 1984); Somalia (1969–1977); Palestine Liberation Organization; Abu Nidal Organization; Polisario Front / Sahrawi Arab Democratic Republic; Arab Nationalist Movement; Ba'ath Party (until 1966); DLF(1963–1968); PFLOAG (1968–1974); NDFLOAG (1969–1971); PFLO (1974–1976); Hezbollah (from 1985); Federation of Arab Republics; Arab Islamic Republic United Arab States (1958–1961): United Arab Republic; Kingdom of Yemen; Supported by: Soviet Union (until 1989); People's Republic of China (until 1972); Afghanistan (from 1978); Bulgaria (until 1989); Cuba (since 1959); Czechoslovakia (until 1989); (Derg) Ethiopia (from 1974); East Germany; Hungary (until 1989); India (limited); Iran (from 1979; limited); North Korea; Poland (until 1989); Romania (until 1989; limited); Yugoslavia (limited)	Saudi Arabia; Kingdom of Iraq (until 1958); Ba'athist Iraq (1979–1990); Jordan; Morocco; Kingdom of Egypt (until 1953); Arab Republic of Egypt (since 1974); Syria (before 1954, 1961–1963); Right Wing of Fatah; Libya (until 1969); Federation of the Emirates of South Arabia / Federation of South Arabia (until 1967); Protectorate of South Arabia (until 1967); Kingdom of Yemen (until 1970); North Yemen (1970–1974, since 1978); Muscat and Oman (until 1970); Imamate of Oman (until 1959); Oman (since 1970); (Sultanate of Zanzibar) Zanzibar (until 1964); Bahrain; Kuwait; Qatar; Somalia (since 1977); Chad; Senegal; Comoros; Djibouti; Sudan (before 1969, since 1985); Trucial States (until 1971); United Arab Emirates (from 1971); Muslim Brotherhood; Arab Federation (1958): Iraq; Jordan; Supported by: United States; United Kingdom; France; Republic of China; People's Republic of China (from 1972; limited); Afghan mujahideen (from 1979); Canada; Ethiopia (until 1974); West Germany; Iran (until 1979); Israel (limited); Italy; Japan; South Korea; Pakistan; Turkey; CENTO (until 1979)	Inconclusive: Decline of pan-Arabism and Nasserism after the death of Gamal Abdel Nasser; Rise of Wahhabism, Salafi jihadism, Islamism and Ba'athism after the death of Nasser; International propagation of Salafism and Wahhabism in several countries financed with Saudi oil exports; Beginning of the 1969 Somali coup d'état, establishing the Somali Democratic Republic; Creation of Gulf Cooperation Council; Failed attempts of an Arab Union: Arab Federation; United Arab Republic; United Arab States; Federation of Arab Republics; United Arab Kingdom; Union of Arab Republics; Arab Islamic Republic; Successful attempts of an Arab Union: Unity of nine Arab emirates to form UAE; Yemeni unification
Uganda–Tanzania War	Uganda; Libya; Palestine Liberation Organization	Tanzania; Uganda National Liberation Front; Kikosi Maalum; Front for National Salvation; Save Uganda Movement; Others; Mozambique	Defeat: Collapse of the Second Republic of Uganda.; Idi Amin flees into exile.
Chadian–Libyan War	Libya: Islamic Legion; Pro-Libyan Chadian factions: FROLINAT; GUNT (1979–1986); Codos (1983–1986); FAP (1978–1986); Palestine Liberation Organization; Abu Nidal Organization	Anti-Libyan Chadian factions: Chadian Armed Forces (1978–1979); Armed Forces of the North (1978–1983); Chadian National Armed Forces (1983–1987); Transitional Government of National Unity (1986–1987); France Inter-African Force: Zaire; Nigeria; Senegal; National Front for the Salvation of Libya	Defeat: Chad regains control of the Aouzou Strip.
First Intifada (1987–1993)	Al-Qiyada al-Muwhhada; Fatah; Popular Front for the Liberation of Palestine; Democratic Front for the Liberation of Palestine; Palestinian Communist Party; Hamas; Palestinian Islamic Jihad	Israel	Uprising suppressed: Madrid Conference (1991); Oslo I Accord (1993); Israel–PLO Letters of Mutual Recognition; Establishment of the Palestinian National Authority; Creation of the West Bank "Areas" by the Oslo II Accord in 1995.
Second Intifada (2000–2005)	Palestinian Authority; PLO; Fatah; Popular Front for the Liberation of Palestine; Democratic Front for the Liberation of Palestine; Hamas; Palestinian Islamic Jihad; Popular Resistance Committees	Israel	Uprising suppressed: Israeli forces withdraw from the Gaza Strip; Israel initiates the Gaza disengagement plan; Israel constructs the West Bank barrier
Salafi jihadist insurgency in the Gaza Strip	(Palestine) Palestinian Joint Operations Room; Hamas government; Israel Palestinian Authority (Until 2007)	(al-Qaeda) (Islamic State) Salafi jihadist groups	Ongoing
2006 Lebanon War	Hezbollah; Amal Movement; Lebanese Communist Party; Popular Front for the Liberation of Palestine – General Command; Syrian Social Nationalist Party in Lebanon	Israel	Inconclusive: Israel occupies Ghajar until present.
2006 Gaza–Israel conflict (2006)	Palestine; Fatah; Hamas; (Palestinian Islamic Jihad) Islamic Jihad	Israel	Israeli military victory: End of Hamas rocketfire into Israel until May 2007 (though continued attacks by other groups); Palestinian Authority forces deploy to stop rocket launches until June 2007.
Battle of Gaza (2007)	Fatah; Palestinian Authority; Support: United States (alleged by Hamas)	Hamas	Hamas victory: Hamas takeover of the Gaza Strip.
Gaza War (2008–2009)	Gaza Strip; Hamas; (Hamas) Ezzedeen al-Qassam Brigades; Popular Front for the Liberation of Palestine; (Popular Front for the Liberation of Palestine) Abu Ali Mustafa Brigades; Islamic Jihad Movement in Palestine; (Palestinian Islamic Jihad) Al-Quds Brigades; Al-Aqsa Martyrs' Brigades; Popular Resistance Committees	Israel; Israel Defense Forces; Israel Security Agency	Defeat: IDF declared unilateral ceasefire, 12 hours later Hamas announced a one-week ceasefire.; Humanitarian crisis and deterioration of infrastructure and basic services in Gaza.; Temporary reduction in the number of rockets being fired from the Gaza Strip.; See results
March 2010 Gaza–Israel clashes	Gaza Strip; Hamas; Palestinian Islamic Jihad; Jaljalat	Israel	Israeli withdrawal from Gaza
2010 Palestinian militancy campaign	(Palestine) Palestinian militias in the West Bank; Hamas; Palestinian Islamic Jihad; Popular Resistance Committees; Al-Aqsa Martyrs' Brigades; Fatah al-Intifada (suspected)	Israel	Hamas-led victory: Direct peace talks between the Palestinian Authority and Israel broke down by late September.
2011 southern Israel cross-border attacks	Gaza Strip; Popular Resistance Committees; (Egypt) Sinai-based attackers	Israel	Attack Succeeded: Eight Israelis – six civilians, one Yamam special unit police sniper and one Golani Brigade soldier—were killed in the multiple-stage attack.
March 2012 Gaza–Israel clashes	Gaza Strip; Palestinian Islamic Jihad; Popular Resistance Committees	Israel	Ceasefire: On March 13, Egypt brokered a ceasefire between Israel and Palestinian militant groups.
2012 Gaza War	Gaza Strip; Hamas; (Hamas) Al-Qassam Brigades; Palestinian Islamic Jihad; Popular Front for the Liberation of Palestine–General Command; Popular Front for the Liberation of Palestine; Democratic Front for the Liberation of Palestine; Popular Resistance Committees; Al-Aqsa Martyrs' Brigades; Jaysh al-Ummah	Israel	Ceasefire: Both sides claim victory; According to Israel, the operation "severely impaired Hamas's launching capabilities."; According to Hamas, their rocket strikes led to the ceasefire deal; Cessation of rocket fire into Israel; Gaza fishermen allowed 6 nmi (11 km) out to sea for fishing; reduced back to 3 nmi (6 km) after 22 March 2013
2014 Gaza War	Gaza Strip; Hamas; Palestinian Islamic Jihad; Democratic Front for the Liberation of Palestine; Popular Front for the Liberation of Palestine; Popular Resistance Committees; Al-Aqsa Martyrs' Brigades; Abdullah Azzam Brigades; Jaysh al-Ummah	Israel	Inconclusive: According to Israel, Hamas was severely weakened and achieved none of its demands.; According to Hamas, Israel was repelled from Gaza.
2015–2016 wave of violence in the Israeli–Palestinian conflict	Palestine: Hamas; (Palestine) Palestinian lone wolves; (Israel) Arab Israeli lone wolves	Israel: Israel Defense Forces; Shin Bet; Israel Police; Magav	Inconclusive
2017 Temple Mount crisis	Islamic Movement in Israel: (Israel) Arab Israeli lone wolves; (Palestine) Jerusalem Waqf; (Palestine) Palestinian protesters.; (Palestine) Palestinians inside Temple Mount.; (Palestine) Palestinian lone wolves; (Jordan) Jordanian lone wolves; (Hamas) Gazan protesters; Palestinian Authority	Israel: Israel Police; Israel Border Police	Inconclusive: Further Temple Mount entry restrictions.
2018–2019 Gaza border protests	Gaza Strip: Palestinian Joint Operations Room; Democratic Front for the Liberation of Palestine; Hamas; Palestinian Islamic Jihad; Popular Front for the Liberation of Palestine; (Palestine) Unaffiliated protesters	Israel: Israel Defense Forces; Israel Border Police	Inconclusive: Exchanges of fire led to 223 Palestinian deaths.
November 2018 Gaza–Israel clashes	Palestinian Joint Operations Room: Hamas; Al-Qassam Brigades; Palestinian Islamic Jihad; Popular Front for the Liberation of Palestine; Al-Aqsa Martyrs' Brigades; Popular Resistance Committees; Al-Nasser Salah al-Deen Brigades	Israel	Ceasefire
May 2019 Gaza–Israel clashes	Palestinian Joint Operations Room: Hamas; Al-Qassam Brigades; Palestinian Islamic Jihad; Democratic Front for the Liberation of Palestine; National Resistance Brigades; Popular Resistance Committees; Al-Nasser Salah al-Deen Brigades	Israel	Ceasefire: In the early morning of 6 May, a ceasefire agreement mediated by Egypt in its capital city Cairo was reached, taking effect at 4:30 A.M (1:30 UTC). At 7:00 A.M., Israel announced all restrictions for residents of the south were lifted, and schools opened normally.
November 2019 Gaza–Israel clashes	(Palestine) Palestinian Joint Operations Room: Palestinian Islamic Jihad	Israel	Ceasefire
2021 Israel–Palestine crisis (2021)	Gaza Strip; Hamas; Palestinian Islamic Jihad; Popular Front for the Liberation of Palestine; Al-Aqsa Martyrs' Brigades; Smaller militant groups (Note: Besides Hamas and the Palestinian Islamic Jihad, FDD's Long War Journal identified the following militant groups as having fought in the 2021 conflict: Jihad Jibril Brigades, Humat al-Aqsa, Jaysh al-Ummah, Katibat al-Sheikh al-Emireen, Mujahideen Brigades, Abdul al-Qadir al-Husseini Brigades, and two al-Aqsa Martyrs Brigades splinter factions.); Protesters in Israel and Palestine: Arab Israeli protesters; Palestinian protesters in the West Bank and Jerusalem; Jordanian, Lebanese, and Syrian protesters (see international)	Israel; Israel Defense Forces; Israeli Air Force; Israel Police; Israel Border Police; Shin Bet; Jewish Israeli protesters	Ceasefire: Return to status quo ante bellum; ceasefire went into effect.; Victory claimed by both sides.; Halting of both Israeli airstrikes inside the Gaza Strip and Palestinian rocket fire into Israel.
2022 Gaza–Israel clashes	(Palestine) Palestinian Joint Operations Room: Palestinian Islamic Jihad	Israel	Ceasefire: Following Egyptian mediation, a ceasefire effective from 22:00 (1900 GMT) on 7 August was agreed according to Egyptian and Palestinian sources, although Israel and the PIJ did not officially confirm this.
2023 wave of violence in the Israeli–Palestinian conflict (Note: Conflicts, shootings, incursions and clashes before the October 7 attacks and the Gaza war: January 2023 Jenin incursion; 2023 Tel Aviv car-ramming; 2023 Neve Yaakov shooting; February 2023 Nablus incursion; 2023 Ramot Junction attack; April 2023 Nablus incursion; April 2023 Palestinian rocket attacks on Israel; 2023 Hamra junction shooting; May 2023 Gaza–Israel clashes; 2023 Al-Aqsa clashes; June 2023 Jenin incursion; 2023 Egypt–Israel border shooting incident; July 2023 Jenin incursion; July 2023 Tel Aviv attack)	Palestinian Joint Operations Room: Hamas; (Hamas) Izz ad-Din al-Qassam Brigades; Palestinian Islamic Jihad; (Palestinian Islamic Jihad) Al-Quds Brigades; Popular Front for the Liberation of Palestine; Liwa al-Quds (Palestine) Palestinian militias in the West Bank: (Palestine) Lions' Den; (Palestine) Nablus Brigade; (Palestine) Balata Brigade; (Palestine) Jenin Brigades; Palestinian civilians Unaffiliated gunmen Arab Israelis; Other militants Egypt: (Egypt) Central Security Forces	Israel: Israel Defense Forces; (Israel) Israeli settlers; Israel Police; Israel Border Police; Yamas; Israeli civilians Foreign civilians and tourists	Inconclusive: Israeli incursions in Jenin and Nablus leave 29–35 militants (4 suspected) and 11 Palestinian civilians dead.; Palestinian shootings and ramming attacks leave 13 Israelis (including 1 fetus) and 2 foreign nationals dead. 4 perpetrators were also killed during the clashes.; Clashes at Al-Aqsa in 2023 lead to 51 injuries and upto 400 arrests. Palestinian militants launch projectile attacks into Israel as retaliation.; Incursion from Egypt led to 4 deaths and 2 injuries.; Israeli settler rampage led to 4 Israeli and 1 Palestinian deaths.; May 2023 Gaza–Israel clashes end with a ceasefire mediated by Egypt on 13 May 2023.
Gaza war (2023–present): October 7 attacks; Israeli invasion of Gaza; Israeli incursions in the West Bank; Anti-Hamas insurgency in the Gaza Strip	Palestinian Joint Operations Room: Hamas; Palestinian Islamic Jihad; Popular Resistance Committees; Popular Front for the Liberation of Palestine; Democratic Front for the Liberation of Palestine; Ex-Fatah groups; Al-Aqsa Martyrs' Brigades; Ayman Jawda Squads; Abdul al-Qadir al-Husseini Brigades; Palestinian Mujahideen Movement; Palestinian Freedom Movement; Popular Front for the Liberation of Palestine – General Command; (Palestine) Palestinian militias in the West Bank; (Palestine) Qabatiya Brigade; (Palestine) Jenin Brigades; (Palestine) Tulkarm Brigade; (Palestine) Nur Shams Brigade; (Palestine) Nablus Brigade; (Palestine) Tubas Brigade; (Palestine) Ramallah Brigade; (Palestine) Khalil al-Rahman Brigade; (Palestine) Lions' Den; (Palestine) Biddya Brigades; (Palestine) Jerusalem Brigades; (Palestine) Al-Ayyash Battalion; Jihadists; Jaysh al-Ummah; Islamic State; (Islamic State) Palestine District; Fatah al-Intifada; Martyr Muhammad al-Deif Brigades; Gazan civilian mobs Abu Suneima family Ayyash family Palestinian Authority	Israel (Note: See List of military aid to Israel during the Gaza war and American involvement) Allies: Popular Forces administration (Note: Popular Forces have been described as a Salafi Jihadist organisation with alleged ties to the Islamic State. Several senior leaders in the Popular Forces also allied with the Islamic State in the Sinai.) (Note: From May 2024); Shuja'iyya Popular Defense Forces administration; Counter-Terrorism Strike Force administration; Fatah-aligned groups; Abu Khammash (surrendered); Abu Moghaiseb (surrendered); Al-Mujaida clan (surrendered); Khanidak clan (surrendered); Abu Samra clan; Non-aligned anti-Hamas clans: Doghmush clan; Barbakh clan; Abu Ziyad clan; Abu Werda clan	Ongoing: De jure ceasefire in effect since 10 October 2025 under second phase of a peace deal.; De facto limited war.; Approx. 64% of Gaza under Israeli military control as of April 2026.; Israel establishes full military control over the Jenin, Nur Shams, and Tulkarm refugee camps.; Eastern Rafah and eastern Khan Yunis come under the control of the Popular Forces; the Ashraf al-Mansi group claims control over parts of northern Gaza as of 14 October 2025.
Hezbollah–Israel conflict (2023–present)	Hezbollah; Amal Movement; Islamic Group; SSNP-L; Islamic Resistance in Iraq (Yemen) Houthis; Iran; Syria (until 2024); Islamic Azz Brigades Palestinian Joint Operations Room: Hamas; Palestinian Islamic Jihad; Popular Resistance Committees; Popular Front for the Liberation of Palestine	Israel Other parties: Lebanon; United Nations Interim Force in Lebanon; Syria	Ongoing: Palestinian militants continue to support Hezbollah against Israel.
2024 Syrian opposition offensives	Ba'athist Syria; Iran; Russia; Hezbollah; Popular Mobilization Forces Palestinian militias: PFLP–GC; Jihad Jibril Brigades; Palestinian Popular Committees; (Palestine) Palestinian People's Party; As-Sa'iqa; Fatah al-Intifada; Palestine Liberation Army; Free Palestine Movement; (Palestine) Galilee Forces; PPSF	Syrian opposition: Syrian Salvation Government; (Syrian opposition) Syrian Interim Government; Jaysh al-Izza; (Syrian opposition) Suqour al-Sham Brigades; Ansar al-Tawhid; Turkistan Islamic Party in Syria; Imam Bukhari Jamaat; Ajnad al-Kavkaz; Jama'at Ansar al-Islam; (Syrian opposition) Southern Operations Room; (Syria) Decisive Battle Operations Room; (Syria) Burkan al-Furat; (Syria) Al-Busraya Revolutionaries; (Syrian opposition) Syrian Free Army; Supported by: Turkey (denied by Turkey); Ukraine (denied by Ukraine)	Defeat: Fall of the Assad regime.; Establishment of the Syrian caretaker government.; End of major battles of the Syrian civil war.; Israeli invasion of Syria begins.; Continued conflict in Syria.; Syrian opposition groups and Autonomous Administration of North and East Syria take control of Syria.
Israeli intervention in Syria (2024–present)	Syria (Palestine) Palestinian militants: (Palestine) Martyr Muhammad al-Deif Brigades; Hamas; (Hamas) Al-Qassam Brigades; (Hamas) Aknaf Bait al-Maqdis remnants; Palestinian Islamic Jihad; (Palestinian Islamic Jihad) Al-Quds Brigade; (Ba'athist Syria) Assadist insurgents: Islamic Resistance Front in Syria; Syrian Popular Resistance; Syrian Social Nationalist Party; Eagles of the Whirlwind; JI: Al-Fajr Forces	Israel	Ongoing: Israel advanced within and beyond the UNDOF buffer zone, capturing Madinat al-Salam, Khan Arnabah, Ma'ariya, Al-Wehda Dam, and Quneitra, as well as the Syrian-controlled side of Mount Hermon.; Israeli forces also reached parts of Qatana District.; Israeli Forces raided the villages of Koudna, Tell Ahmar al-Sharqi on 3 May 2026.

== See also ==
- List of wars involving Palestine
- List of wars involving Israel
- List of modern conflicts in the Middle East
- Palestinian casualties of war
