= Mujahid Bani Mufleh =

Palestinian journalist

- مجاهد بني مفلح
- Other names: Mujahed Bani Mufleh; Mujahid Bani Muflih
- Occupation: Journalist
- Children: 3

Mujahid Bani Mufleh (Arabic: مجاهد بني مفلح, romanized: Mujāhid Banī Mufliḥ) is a Palestinian journalist from the West Bank. He has been imprisoned three times by Israeli occupation forces in 2015, 2020, and 2025, without a trial or any charges. His third detention resulted in a multitude of physical injuries, including a brain hemorrhage. A side-by-side comparison of pre- and post-release selfies of himself, which showed his severely deteriorated condition, went viral in June 2026.

Mufleh has worked at a variety of outlets, such as Al-Quds and UltraPalestine, reporting on topics such as the illegal Israeli occupation of the West Bank.

== Early life and education ==
Mufleh is the son of Muhammad Bani Mufleh. He has lived in Beitunia and Beita.

Mufleh studied journalism at the Institute of Modern Media at Al-Quds University. He has three children.

== Career ==
Mufleh is a journalist by trade and has worked for a variety of media outlets. He previously worked in news reporting and radio presenting. Mufleh has reported on topics such as Palestinian politics, the Israeli occupation of the West Bank, the Gaza war, and the plight of Palestinians in Israeli custody, as well as international relations in the Middle East. He has also published human-interest stories, such as a profile on a Palestinian prisoner who worked as a barber at the infamous Megiddo prison, or another about a math teacher who was awarded the title of "Teacher of Palestine" in 2021. In 2022, Mufleh published a profile about a Palestinian emigrant to Sweden who wrote a children's book about Palestine to share with his children after he was unable to find one.

== Arrests and imprisonment ==
=== First arrest (2015) ===
Mufleh was arrested for the first time by the Israel Defense Forces (IDF) in 2015; he was taken into custody on 19 January after a large group of soldiers raided, searched, and ransacked his home in Beitunia. At the time, Mufleh was a journalist and news editor at Here is Jerusalem (هنا القدس, Hunā al-Quds) Community Media Network, which is affiliated with Al-Quds University, in addition to working for the Al-Akhbar newspaper and the Zaman Press Agency. His detention was later extended for an additional eight days, ostensibly to finish the legal procedures. Mufleh was released on 5 February, without being charged with any crimes. The Ahrar Center for Prisoner Studies and Human Rights condemned the arrest, with its director Fouad Al-Khafash stressing that journalism was "an important tool in the Palestinian struggle." The arrest was similarly condemned by other media unions and organizations like the Palestinian Journalists' Syndicate (PJS), which urged international institutions to demand his release, and the Palestinian Youth Media Forum.

=== Second arrest (2020) ===
On 26 February 2020, Muflih was arrested by Israeli soldiers at the Za'tara checkpoint while traveling with his wife and two children to his home in Beita. Both his and his wife's phones were seized, and he was taken to a police station in the Israeli settlement of Ariel, where he was interrogated on charges of "incitement through his social media page", reportedly in reference to posts he made on Facebook concerning the violent attempted seizure of Mount Al-Arma, located near Beita, by Israeli settlers. At the time, Muflih worked for Al-Quds and UltraPalestine. (Note: UltraPalestine is a branch of the regional media network Ultrasawt.) He was brought before the Israeli military court in Salim on 1 March; his detention was extended, and his trial was adjourned to 5 March, but he was not charged with any crimes and ultimately released. The arrest was criticized by Israeli anti-occupation activist Tamar Goldschmidt.

In early 2023, the Facebook page for UltraPalestine, which Mufleh had posted to along with colleague Ahmed Khader Youssef, was restricted shortly after reporting on the 2023 Huwara attacks.

On 10 April 2023, Mufleh covered a demonstration by several thousand Israeli ultra-nationalists, including government ministers and legislators, to demand recognition of an illegal Israeli settlement south of Nablus. He was one of several Palestinian journalists who were deliberately targeted by Israeli soldiers with teargas in the town of Beita, despite wearing identifiable press vests, while attempting to help a colleague who had been injured by a rubber bullet. "Anyone who tried to move or get closer to film the march was liable to have teargas fired at them," said Mufleh. Several videos of the attack were recorded. Reporters Without Borders called on Israel "to end its systematic attacks on Palestinian journalists, which are encouraged by impunity."

In December 2024, Mufleh was summoned for questioning by Palestinian security forces in Ramallah, specifically regarding coverage of the Palestinian Authority operation in Jenin.

=== Third arrest (2025–2026) ===
On 28 June 2025, Mufleh was violently arrested during a raid of his home in Beita by a large group of Israeli soldiers, which occurred around 3:30 a.m. The soldiers beat him, smashed his home office, and photographed his social media pages before transporting him to a military detention center in Huwara. By this time, Mufleh was the editor of UltraPalestine. The arrest was part of a large-scale IDF raid campaign carried out that morning in towns across the West Bank.

In July 2025, Mufleh was sentenced to four months of administrative detention by the Israeli military court in Salim. He was held at the Menashe prison, located within the Salem military camp. In October, Mufleh's detention was extended for two additional months. In December, his administrative detention was extended again for an additional two months.

During his detention, Mufleh was subjected to regular beatings, particularly to his head and back, and especially during transfers between prison cells. He also experienced loss of sensation in his limbs due to prolonged periods where his hands and feet remained shackled in iron restraints. Mufleh was denied access to healthcare and medication for his Type 2 diabetes and lost around 25 kg (55 lb) during his detention. According to the PJS, he was "subjected to deliberate medical negligence, administered inappropriate medication, and exposed to torture and systematic starvation." He also claims to have witnessed the death of two fellow detainees.

Mufleh was released from detention on 11 January 2026. However, his health quickly deteriorated, suffering severe headaches, extreme fatigue, and difficulty breathing. Mufleh was rushed to the Istishari Arab Hospital in Ramallah, (Note: Sources conflict over how soon he was hospitalized after his release from detention, ranging from one to three days.) where he was diagnosed with a severe brain hemorrhage and high blood pressure due to physical trauma and malnutrition; he also suffered a stroke. He underwent a successful emergency brain surgery to relieve pressure from his brain, but fell into a coma. Muflih underwent several more surgeries and recovered at the Ibn Sina Specialized Hospital in Jenin, requiring assistance with movement, swallowing and speech.

I never forgot that I was a journalist. Throughout my detention, I kept thinking that one day I would tell the stories of those who could no longer speak for themselves. But time never gave me that chance. Before I could write about the tortured, I suffered a stroke. And instead of writing their stories, I became the story.
–Mufleh speaking to Middle East Eye in June 2026

Over a month after his release, the PJS reported that his condition had further deteriorated. It stated that it "held the Israeli occupation authorities fully responsible for the serious deterioration" of his health, calling on international institutions to investigate the case and Israel's broader "deliberate and systematic policy of killing Palestinian journalists".

Heavy days in which I experienced hunger until bread became a dream, and thirst until a sip of water became a blessing. I endured forms of humiliation and torture capable of changing the features of the soul before the body. There, between the cold walls and the long nights, I learned how hunger can break pride, and how pain can strip a person of everything except faith and patience.
–Mufleh recounting his detention in a June 2026 Facebook post

In June 2026, following months of treatment, Mufleh wrote about his experience in a Facebook post, recounting both the abuse he faced in prison and his "long journey of healing, an extension of that pain; pain on top of pain, and a daily attempt to reclaim what was stripped of body and soul." He also included a selfie of himself where he is "visibly pale, significantly emaciated, and unrecognisable compared to his previous appearance", according to News18, in addition to showing that part of his skull had been removed during a surgery. Similarly, Middle East Eye described Mufleh as "gaunt and frail, his face hollow, his eyes sunken, looking years older than when he entered prison."

A side-by-side comparison of his post-release photo with an image taken before his detention went viral, attracting global media attention. It sparked widespread anger on social media and calls for accountability from journalists and human rights groups.

The Asra Media Office described his case as a "deferred execution" or "slow killing", stating that it held the IDF "fully and directly responsible" for his condition. The group also linked his case to the widespread mistreatment of Palestinian prisoners and journalists by Israel "in a clear attempt to suppress the Palestinian narrative and silence those who document the crimes" of the Gaza genocide. Journalist Ahmed Shihab-Eldin wrote: "The images speak to a system designed to break Palestinian bodies as much as silence Palestinian voices: starvation, abuse, humiliation, and imprisonment without accountability."

In an interview with the Anadolu Agency from his hospital bed, Mufleh said he posted the image of himself despite objections from his friends because he "wanted to show people the truth" about his condition. "I miss the old Mujahid," he said in late June. "My wife and children are always around me, and they hope I will return to the way I was."

Despite his condition, Mufleh told Middle East Eye that he wanted to keep his promise of telling the stories of his fellow detainees, such as Samir al-Rifai and Ahmad Taza'zah, both of whom died due to torture sustained.
