= Ibrahim al-Nabulsi =

Palestinian militant (2003–2022)

- إبراهيم النابلسي
- Born: Ibrahim Alaa Ezzat al-Nabulsi; 13 October 2003; Nablus, occupied West Bank, Palestine
- Died: 9 August 2022 (aged 18); Nablus, occupied West Bank, Palestine
- Occupation: Militant
- Organizations: Al-Aqsa Martyrs' Brigades; Palestinian Islamic Jihad; Nablus Brigade; Lions' Den

Ibrahim Alaa Ezzat al-Nabulsi (Arabic: إبراهيم علاء عزت النابلسي; 13 October 2003 – 9 August 2022) was a Palestinian militant who co-founded both the Nablus Brigade and Lions' Den militias. Nicknamed the "Lion of Nablus" (أسد نابلس, Asad Nābulus), al-Nabulsi had gained prominence on social media for his participation in armed actions against Israelis in the West Bank. Despite evading arrest for several months, al-Nabulsi was eventually tracked down to a building in central Nablus on 9 August 2022, where he was killed in a shootout against Israeli forces.

== Early life ==
Ibrahim al-Nabulsi was born on 13 October 2003, during the Second Intifada. Ibrahim's father, Alaa al-Nabulsi, was an officer in the Palestinian National Security Forces. Like many young Palestinians in the West Bank, al-Nabulsi was critical of the Palestinian Authority.

== Militant activity ==
While al-Nabulsi has been reported in the media as being a member of the Al-Aqsa Martyrs' Brigades, he claimed to belong to no specific group and claimed allegiance to all Palestinian militant groups. Furthermore, al-Nabulsi was associated with the Palestinian Islamic Jihad's armed wing, the al-Quds Brigades.

On 9 February 2022, al-Nabulsi and several other militants were targeted for assassination by undercover Israeli forces (IDF). While al-Nabulsi and several others were in a car, a taxi containing undercover personnel from the Yamam unit opened fire on their car, resulting in the assassination of three militants. However, al-Nabulsi escaped, and subsequently, was wanted by the Israeli security forces.

Following this encounter, al-Nabulsi's became a local celebrity in Nablus. Furthermore, al-Nabulsi gained a following on TikTok, with his posts reaching hundreds of thousands of people. Despite being wanted, al-Nabulsi was often seen walking around in Nablus, where locals often filmed him and asked for selfies. Al-Nabulsi was described as being kind and genuine during his interactions with the residents of Nablus.

In June 2022, Ibrahim al-Nabulsi was involved in an attack against Israeli religious tourists travelling to Joseph's Tomb and their IDF escorts, in which two civilians and one soldier were wounded.

== Death ==
Following 6 months in which he was alleged to be on the run, al-Nabulsi was tracked down to a residential building in the Old City of Nablus during the early hours of 9 August 2022. Israeli forces surrounded the building while al-Nabulsi and two other militants, 32-year-old Islam Sabbouh and 16-year-old Hussein Jamal Taha, responded by barricading themselves within the building and firing on the soldiers. When Israeli forces began assaulting the building, Palestinian civilians rioted and attacked the soldiers, to which the latter responded with riot-dispersal tool and live fire. While under siege, al-Nabulsi recorded an audio message, in which he stated:

Take care of the homeland. I am surrounded now but I will fight until I become a martyr. I love my mother. Don't abandon the gun.

During the gunfight, which lasted for several hours, Sabbouh and Taha were killed, while al-Nabulsi was wounded by a gunshot to the neck. al-Nabulsi managed to escape the building, and was carried to Rafidia Hospital on a stretcher. Hundreds of Palestinians surrounded the hospital, where al-Nabulsi died an hour after arriving. A funeral procession took place later that day, which was attended by over 10,000 Palestinians.
