= 2023 Nablus incursion =

2023 Nablus incursion may refer to:

- February 2023 Nablus incursion
- April 2023 Nablus incursion
