= Ariel Gonen =

Israeli military officer

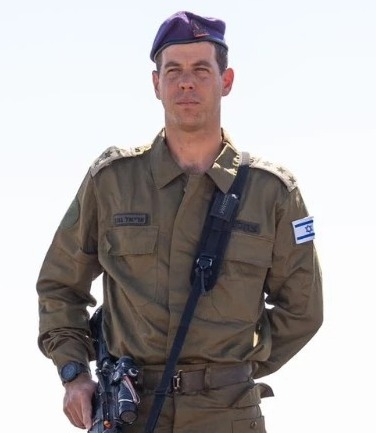
- Gonen, 2024
- Born: December 7, 1986 (age 39); Israel
- Allegiance: Israel
- Branch: Israel Defense Forces
- Service years: 2005–present
- Rank: Colonel
- Commands: Samaria Brigade Gefen Battalion Givati Reconnaissance Unit
- Conflicts: 2006 Lebanon War Operation Protective Edge Iron Swords War

Ariel Gonen (Hebrew: אריאל גונן; born 7 December 1986) is an Israeli military officer holding the rank of colonel in the Israel Defense Forces (IDF). He currently serves as the commander of the Samaria Brigade. Previously, he served as commander of the Gefen Battalion and as commander of the Givati Reconnaissance Unit.

== Biography ==
Gonen is the son of Shabtai and Yaffa. He volunteered for the Givati Reconnaissance Unit in November 2005 and successfully completed the unit's training pipeline. In 2008, he attended the IDF Infantry Officers Course, after which he was appointed as a team commander in the Givati Reconnaissance Unit.

On 27 May 2009, Gonen was seriously injured in a motorcycle accident while traveling from the Golan Heights to southern Israel, after colliding with a truck. Following several years of rehabilitation, during which he nearly lost his right leg, he returned to active service in the IDF. In 2019, he was responsible for the advanced training and qualification phase of the Givati Reconnaissance Unit, from the completion of advanced training through the end of the operational course.

In 2021, Gonen was appointed commander of the Givati Reconnaissance Unit. During his tenure, the unit conducted numerous operations, including significant counterterrorism activities in the Nablus area against the militant group known as the "Lions' Den".

In 2023, he completed his tenure as reconnaissance unit commander and was appointed commander of the Gefen Battalion, a position he held for one year. During this period, he led the battalion in combat operations in the Gaza Strip as part of the Iron Swords War.

On 21 August 2024, Gonen was promoted to the rank of colonel and assumed command of the Samaria Brigade.

== Personal life ==
Gonen is married to Avital and is the father of two children.
