= Death of Tiran Fero =

2022 hostage taking in Jenin, West Bank

On 23 November 2022, a 17-year old Israeli Druze student named Tiran Fero, from Daliyat al-Karmel, was severely injured in a car crash near the Palestinian city of Jenin, where he was going to a car mechanic. He was brought to a local hospital for treatment. According to his family members, he died after being removed from life support and his body was held hostage by members of the Jenin Brigades, a Palestinian armed group. However, the Israel Defense Forces (IDF) and Palestinian sources have said that he was already dead when the militants seized his body. The Jenin Brigades attempted to exchange Fero's body for the bodies of Palestinians held by Israel but released the body after 30 hours of diplomatic pressure and threats of military intervention from the IDF.

== Crash ==
Tiran Fero (Hebrew: טירן פרו; 24 November 2004 – 23 November 2022) was driving to Hebron with his friend Adir Daksa, intending to buy a new speaker system for his vehicle. He was one day away from celebrating his 18th birthday. His car lost control and the ensuing crash left both teenagers wounded, Fero seriously. While Daksa was brought to an Israeli hospital, Fero's serious injuries meant that he could not be transported to Israel. He was instead brought to a local Jenin hospital where he was placed on life support. Upon hearing the news his father Husam and uncle Edri both rushed to the hospital to be with him.

== Hospital storming ==
The hospital was later stormed a little after 8:30 pm by 20 members of the Palestinian group Jenin Brigades. According to his father and uncle, the attackers disconnected Fero from the life support and held him hostage. Fero died shortly after according to his family, but his body was held hostage for 30 hours. However, the Palestinian media and the IDF have both said that Fero had already died at the time of the kidnapping. The group said it would only hand over Fero's body if Israel handed over the bodies of Palestinians killed by Israel.

== Aftermath ==
Israeli Druze, including the victim's father Tarif, threatened to storm Jenin themselves and retrieve Fero's body if it was not returned by the following day. Druze protesters blocked Highway 6 and the mayor of Daliyat el-Karmel urged residents of the town not to take the law into their own hands. Protesters were heard chanting "with soul and blood we will redeem Tiran." In related incidents, three Israeli Druze soldiers were arrested after throwing explosives at a Palestinian home in revenge. A video emerged in which a group of five masked armed Druze men showed three Palestinian workers they had kidnapped near Hebron. The men said that this action was "An eye for an eye, and a tooth for a tooth", threatening to harm the workers if Fero's body was not returned. The workers were later released after being beaten.

Palestinian Authority officials said they were trying to get the body back. Several Palestinian and Israeli Arab politicians called for the body to be returned, including Ahmad Tibi, Governor of Jenin Akram Rajoub, local officials in Jenin, and Raed Salah (leader of the outlawed Northern Branch of the Islamic Movement in Israel organization). According to security officials, the suspects holding Fero's body demanded the release of Palestinian prisoners in Israel.

After his body had been held for about 30 hours in the West Bank, Fero's body was returned to his family on 24 November following diplomatic pressure and an IDF warning to launch a large-scale operation if the body were not returned. Hours later, Fero was buried in a funeral attended by thousands of mourners in his hometown of Daliyat al-Karmel, on what would have been his 18th birthday. Eulogists prayed for peace.

On December 1, Israeli forces killed Mohammed Ayman Saadi, a commander of the Jenin Brigades of the Al-Quds Brigades, the armed with of the Palestinian Islamic Jihad (PIJ), and Na'im Jamal Zubeidi from the al-Aqsa Martyrs Brigades in a pre-dawn raid in the Al-Hadaf area of Jenin. Zubeidi was the cousin of Zakaria Zubeidi, former Jenin chief of the Al-Aqsa Martyrs' Brigades. According to the al-Quds Brigades, Palestinian militants fired on the IDF forces as they surrounded the house of two arrest targets. According to Israel, Saadi was involved in the abduction's planning and directed negotiations with the PA. Fatah and PIJ called for a general strike in mourning for the two militants.

At an Otzma Yehudit meeting on 5 December 2022, a cousin of Fero (Fero's family was attending the meeting) reiterated that the boy had died after being unplugged from the life support.

In 2023, Fero's family filed a complaint with the International Criminal Court demanding the Palestinian Authority be investigated over its alleged involvement in Tiran's death.

== See also ==
- 2022 Jerusalem bombings, which happened on the same day as the kidnapping
