= Nablus Brigade =

Palestinian militia

- كتيبة نابلس
- Other name: Nablus Battalion
- Founders: Ibrahim al-Nabulsi †; Other militants
- Dates active: May 2022–present
- Ideology: Palestinian nationalism Anti-Zionism
- Part of: Al-Quds Brigades; Al-Aqsa Martyrs' Brigades al-Qassam Brigades

The Nablus Brigade or Nablus Battalion (Arabic: كتيبة نابلس, romanized: Katībat Nābulus) is a Palestinian militia based in the city of Nablus, in the Israeli-occupied West Bank. It formally belongs to the Al-Quds Brigades of Palestinian Islamic Jihad, to the Al-Aqsa Martyrs' Brigades, and to the Al-Qassam Brigades of Hamas.

The group's formation was announced in May 2022, during a period when a variety of other multi-affiliated autonomous militias in the West Bank, such as the Jenin Brigades and Tubas Brigade, were being formed to fight against the Israel Defense Forces (IDF).

The Al-Aqsa Martyrs' Brigade commander Ibrahim al-Nabulsi was a co-founder of the Nablus Brigade and its most important leader; he was killed by the IDF on 9 August 2022 during a shootout in Nablus. Nabulsi also co-founded Lions' Den, which grew out of the Nablus Brigade.

The Nablus Brigade fought the IDF during their February 2023 Nablus incursion, alongside Lions' Den and the Balata Brigade. In August 2024, the Brigade clashed with IDF troops raiding the Old Askar refugee camp east of Nablus, and in December 2024, it launched an attack on Israeli forces that were escorting Israeli settlers to Joseph's Tomb. It has participated in fighting during Israel's ongoing operation in the West Bank (January 2025–present).

== See also ==
- Tulkarm Brigade
- Israeli incursions in the West Bank during the Gaza war
