= Za'tara checkpoint =

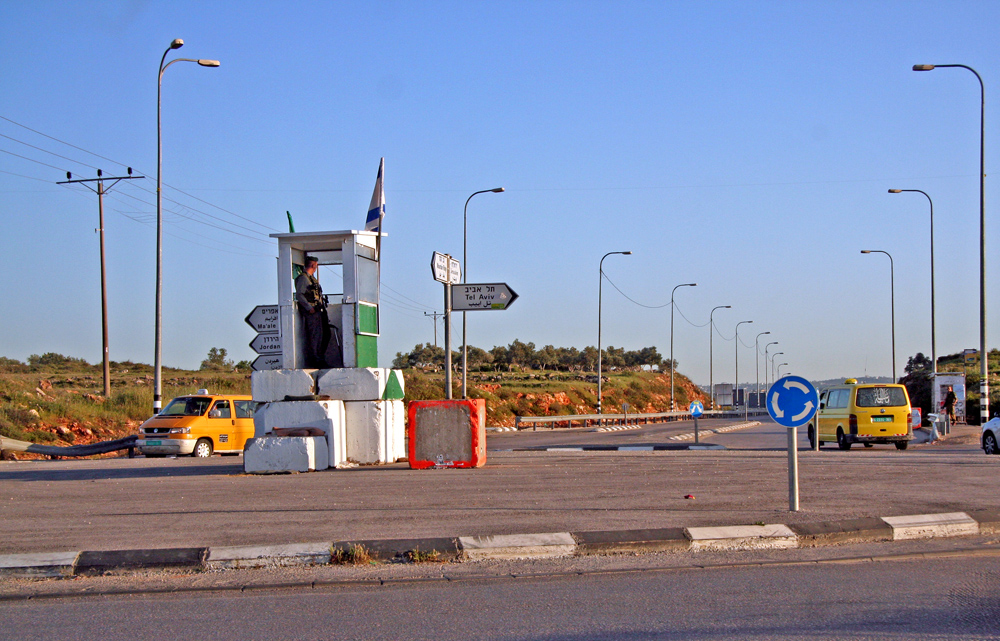
- The checkpoint in 2010

Locaiton
- Location: West Bank
- Coordinates: 32°6′55″N 35°15′17″E

Details
- Opened: 2005
- Operated by: Israel Defence Forces

The Za'tara checkpoint (Arabic: حاجز زعترة), also known as the Tapuach Junction (Hebrew: צומת תפוח), is an Israeli checkpoint in central West Bank established in 2005. The checkpoint is located near the Palestinian village Za'tara and the Israeli settlement Kfar Tapuach. The junction that the checkpoint is located at connects Highway 60 with Route 505, and is a traffic point between Ramallah and Nablus.

There have been several instances of individuals being found with explosive devices near the checkpoint, and the IDF has established an army camp west of the checkpoint for security purposes.

On 14 July 2020, Israel announced its intention to seize about 1,401 dunams of land from the village of Yasuf to construct a water pumping station for the nearby Kfar Tapuach.

== Attacks ==
- On 10 February 2010, IDF Major General Ihab Khatib was killed when a Palestinian police officer carried out a stabbing attack.
- On 21 April 21 2012, Israel Border Police officers intercepted an attempted attack at the intersection and arrested two 17-year-olds. The two were armed with 4 pipe bombs, a gun, and ammunition.
- On 29 January 29 2013, an Israeli teenager was stabbed while waiting at a traffic light at an intersection. The teenager was slightly injured in his stomach.
- On 30 April 2013, Evyatar Borovsky was murdered in a stabbing attack carried out by a Palestinian terrorist who was a member of the Fatah. A monument was erected in Evyatar's memory at the intersection, as well as in the settlement of Evyatar.
- On the night of 2-3 June 2014, a Border Guard soldier was injured by gunfire from a terrorist at an intersection. IDF forces killed the prepetrator soon afterwards.
- On 2 October 2014, Border Guard soldiers intercepted an attempted attack and arrested two Palestinians who carried explosive devices.
- On 24 November 2015, a Palestinian carried out a car bombing attack at the Tapuach Junction, injuring several IDF soldiers, including officers with the rank of lieutenant colonel and lieutenant colonel. The perpetrator was shot and seriously injured.
- On 19 October 2016, a resident from Asira ash-Shamaliya attempted to carry out a stabbing attack against Border Guard soldiers at the checkpoint. The perpetrator was killed soon afterwards.
- On 20 April 2019, a Palestinian attempted to carry out a stabbing attack against Border Police soldiers at the checkpoint. He was shot and wounded by a police officer, and died from his wounds a week later.
- On 2 May 2021, a shooting attack occurred at the intersection leaving three civilians injured. Yehuda Guetta, who was critically injured in the shooting attack, later died of his wounds. Three days later, IDF forces arrested the perpetrator in the village of Silwad and later demolished his house in the village of Turmus Ayya.
- On 31 January 2023, a car accident occurred at the intersection, injuring two IDF reserve soldiers.
