= 2024–2025 Palestinian Authority operation in Jenin =

Operation Protect the Homeland
- Part of the Palestinian Authority–West Bank militias conflict and the Middle Eastern crisis (2023–present)
Date	5 December 2024 – 21 January 2025 (1 month, 2 weeks and 2 days)
Location	Jenin, West Bank, Palestine
Result	Operation merges into the 2025 Israeli raid on Jenin

Belligerents
Palestinian Authority; Supported by: (Palestine) Pro-PA civilian protestors United States Israel (Note: The IDF endorsed the PA operation in Jenin and initially stated it supported strengthening the PA so it could fight militants more effectively. However, on 29 December 2024, Israel decided to not approve weapons transfers from the United States to the PA forces. Later, in mid-January 2025, the IDF conducted airstrikes targeting militants in Jenin amid the PA operation, which the PA itself condemned as a disruptive interference. On 21 January, Israel launched its own raid against militants in Jenin, as PA forces withdrew from their positions.)	Palestinian Islamic Jihad; Al-Aqsa Martyrs' Brigades; Hamas; Supported by: (Palestine) Anti-PA civilian protestors

Commanders and leaders
(Palestine) Mahmoud Abbas (Palestine) Nidal Abu Dukhan	Yazid Jaayseh †; Qais al Saa’di

Units involved
Palestinian Security Services; Palestinian National Security Forces; 101st Unit; General Intelligence Service; Palestinian Preventive Security; Palestinian Presidential Guard; Palestinian Civil Police Force; Israel Defense Forces; Israeli Air Force	(Palestinian Islamic Jihad) (Fatah) (Hamas) Jenin Brigades (Note: Like most of the other Palestinian militias in the West Bank, the Jenin Brigades are semi-autonomous and "cross-factional", unifying militants belonging to the Al-Quds Brigades of PIJ, the Al-Aqsa Martyrs' Brigades, and the Al-Qassam Brigades of Hamas.)

Strength
~300 personnel	~200 militants

Casualties and losses
3 security officers killed Several security officers injured 2 intelligence officers killed 1 presidential guard killed 3 police officers injured	At least 9 militants killed 20+ militants injured
- At least 8 civilians killed 20+ civilians injured 10,000 civilians temporarily displaced

On 5 December 2024, the Palestinian Authority (PA) began a large-scale operation in the West Bank city of Jenin against the Jenin Brigades, a local Palestinian militia. The PA called it "Operation Protect the Homeland" (Note: Arabic: عملية حماية الوطن) and said it was launched in order to "eradicate sedition and chaos" in the West Bank, portraying militants as agents of instability that are indirectly aiding the Israeli far-right, which has sought to weaken the PA.

The operation marked the largest and most violent confrontation that the PA has had with West Bank militants, and analysts have referred to the events as "the most fierce" inter-Palestinian fighting since the 2007 Battle of Gaza. It also marked the first time in several years that PA forces conducted a large-scale incursion into the militant-controlled Jenin refugee camp, where most of the fighting has been concentrated.

During the operation, multiple reports of human rights abuses committed by Palestinian Authority forces in Jenin surfaced, and the PA shut down Al Jazeera in the Palestinian enclaves for airing such reports.

On 17 January 2025, the Palestinian Authority reached a deal with the Jenin Brigades for ending the standoff in Jenin and its refugee camp. The deal failed as fighting resumed two days later. On 21 January, the operation effectively came to a halt, when PA forces withdrew from their positions as the Israel Defense Forces (IDF) began a major raid on the Jenin camp.

== Background ==
Since 2022, there has been an ongoing armed conflict between the Palestinian Authority and local anti-Israel militias, which has escalated during the ongoing Gaza war. The Palestinian Authority, which autonomously governs the Palestinian enclaves of the Israeli-occupied West Bank, has been frequently characterized as a partner of Israel and complicit in the occupation.

The PA, widely perceived as ineffective, has been also been seeking to bolster its credibility as an administration capable of strong governance and suppressing militants. The PA also seeks to improve the chances of an outcome to the ongoing Gaza war where it governs the Gaza Strip. Similar aims motivated the PA during its earlier operation into Tubas in October 2024; its success in that campaign emboldened it to conduct the operation against the Jenin Brigades. Finally, the PA has feared that West Bank militias may be inspired by the rapid December 2024 fall of the Assad regime in Syria and aim to topple the PA.

Jenin has historically been a hotbed of conflict between Palestinian militants and Israel, and the city's refugee camp has especially been a militant stronghold. The Jenin Brigades formed in the city in 2021 and has engaged in confrontations with both Israel and the Palestinian Authority. The semi-autonomous Brigades operate simultaneously under three militant factions: Palestinian Islamic Jihad (PIJ), Al-Aqsa Martyrs' Brigades, and Hamas.

== Timeline of events ==
=== 2024 ===
==== 5 December ====
Clashes broke out between the PA security forces and militants in Jenin after the former arrested several wanted militants in the city. During the clashes, militants seized two vehicles belonging to the security forces, which were later seen paraded around Jenin.

==== 6 December ====
Militants detonated a car bomb near a police station, wounding three Palestinian policemen and two civilians. Following the bombing, PA president Mahmoud Abbas reportedly ordered security forces to take control of the Jenin refugee camp and threatened to fire reluctant security officials. The PA also contacted the United States, briefing the Joe Biden administration and advisers of American president-elect Donald Trump about their plans and requesting military assistance.

==== 9 December ====
PA security forces launched a large-scale incursion into the Jenin refugee camp for the first time in several years, seizing and dismantling IEDs and detaining several militants.

==== 10 December ====
Mahmoud Abu-Talal, a local militant commander, was seen leading a demonstration calling for the overthrow of the Palestinian Authority.

==== 12 December ====
Israeli media reported that Abbas ordered security forces not to leave Jenin until they "resolve the situation", and that Israel warned the Palestinian Authority that the operation was "proceeding too slowly and on too small a scale".

==== 14 December ====
Brigadier General Anwar Rajab, a spokesman for the PA security forces, formally announced the operation and vowed that the PA would regain control of the Jenin refugee camp. Rajab also compared local militants to ISIS.

Security forces operating in the Jenin camp killed Yazid Jaayseh, a commander of the Jenin Brigades. Security forces also set up checkpoints, besieged the Jenin Government Hospital, stormed Ibn Sina Hospital, and were detaining and searching ambulances. PA snipers were deployed on some buildings in the camp.

That night, civilians demonstrated in favor of the Jenin Brigades, and security forces stationed near the city's Shifa Hospital opened fire on the crowd, causing injuries.

UNRWA announced the suspension of its services in the Jenin camp on account of the fighting.

==== 15 December ====
The United States asked Israel to urgently approve a supply of equipment and ammunition for the PA forces operating in Jenin.

==== 16 December ====
The Palestinian Authority claimed its security forces had made significant advances in the Jenin refugee camp, and that half the camp was now under operational control.

The residents of Jenin also undertook a general strike in protest of the operation.

==== 18 December ====
An unnamed commander of the Jenin Brigades reported that attempted negotiations with the security forces ended in failure.

==== 20 December ====
PA security forces forcibly removed protestors who were demonstrating against the operation.

UNRWA reported that it no longer had control over its Jenin health center due to the presence of "Palestinian armed actors".

==== 23 December ====
Fatah, the party that governs the Palestinian Authority, announced its decision to ban the Qatari media network Al Jazeera from operating in the West Bank and condemned it for "incitement" during its coverage of the operation. Fatah accused Al Jazeera of sowing division "in our Arab homeland in general and in Palestine in particular," and called on Palestinians to avoid cooperating with the network.

=== 2025 ===
==== 1 January ====
PA forces implemented the ban on Al Jazeera, with PA police raiding their office in Ramallah and handing over a suspension order.

==== 5 January ====
The Jenin Brigades reportedly managed to seize an RPG from PA forces that retreated from a residence in the Jenin camp.

==== 6 January ====
The Jenin Brigades targeted PA forces withdrawing from the entrance to Jenin with gunfire and an IED.

Jenin Brigades members carried out the al-Funduq shooting against three Israelis and then returned, undetected, to the Jenin camp; the attack was meant to be a message to the PA– that it could not stifle militants' reprisals against the Israeli occupation.

==== 14 January ====
An Israeli Air Force aircraft bombed the Jenin camp, killing six Palestinians, including civilians and at least four militants. It marked the first time the IDF has targeted the refugee camp amid the PA siege. The PA itself condemned the airstrike as a disruptive interference with their operation.

The Jenin Brigades said that it accepted an initiative for ending Palestinian infighting.

==== 15 January ====
The IDF launched a second airstrike on Jenin, killing six Palestinians, including at least one militant, as well as civilians.

==== 17 January ====
The Palestinian Authority and the Jenin Brigades reached an agreement to end the fighting, following the resumption of negotiations a day before and an extensive meeting between militia representatives, community leaders, and security officials. The deal requires specific members of the Jenin Brigades to hand over their weapons, allows the PA to operate freely in the Jenin refugee camp, and provides for the release of detainees in PA custody. That night, PA forces were freely deployed inside the camp.

==== 19 January ====
The truce failed to hold as fighting resumed in the Jenin camp. The Jenin Brigades claimed that the PA had violated the agreement and militants reportedly opened fire on PA forces in the camp. According to the militia, their specific grievance was that PA forces, including snipers, had failed to lift their siege around the camp.

==== 21 January ====
PA forces withdrew from their positions as the IDF began a major raid on the Jenin camp, likely since it deemed the PA's efforts against militants insufficient. According to the PA, the Israeli operation caught them by surprise and members of its forces were killed by Israeli fire. According to Israel, however, the PA was informed of the decision to enter Jenin beforehand, and PA forces withdrew to allow the IDF to proceed with their raid.

== Aftermath ==
The day after Israel began its raid on Jenin, PA forces resumed anti-militant operations inside the city alongside the Israeli forces. It marks the first time that the PA directly participates in an Israeli raid.

At a news conference in January and in an interview in February, Brigadier General Rajab outlined what he said were accomplishments of the PA operation, namely the arrest of hundreds of militants and their accomplices, the seizing of illicit funds, explosives, and weapons, and the defusing of bombs in Jenin neighborhoods meant to target Israeli forces.

== Humanitarian impact and alleged human rights violations ==
The operation left the Jenin refugee camp under siege, with no movement in or out, cuts to electricity and water, and ambulances unable to enter or exit. Palestinian Authority forces have also turned several homes into military outposts, forcibly displacing their residents.

Internet videos surfaced showing PA forces beating and torturing Palestinians who expressed opposition to the Jenin operation on social media. In one case detainees were filmed being forced to chant in praise of President Abbas. The crackdown spread to areas outside of Jenin as well, with one Palestinian activist in Artas near Bethlehem reporting that security forces had raided his home and insulted his family in response to his criticism of the operation. Rajab said that the incidents were under investigation.

A team from the Palestine Red Crescent Society testified to being detained, beaten and interrogated by PA forces for two and a half days while they were trying to deliver medications to besieged families.

After the attempted ceasefire failed to hold, local sources reported on 20 January 2025 that PA forces were setting fire to various houses in the Jenin camp.

=== Killings of civilians by PA forces ===
A total of eight civilians were killed by PA forces during the operation.

On 9 December 2024, 19-year old Rahbi Shalabi was killed during the fighting, with the PA initially claiming militants were responsible. Later, the PA admitted "full responsibility" for Shalabi's killing.

A young Palestinian journalist, Shatha al-Sabbagh, was reportedly killed on 28 December 2024 by PA snipers, according to her family. Rajab claimed that it was militants who shot and killed her.

On 3 January 2025, Mahmoud al-Jalqamousi and his son, Qasem Mahmoud al-Jalqamousi, were shot and killed when they stepped onto the roof of their house in the Jenin camp.

== Related fighting outside of Jenin ==
Clashes between militants and security forces in response to the events in Jenin were also reported in Nablus and Tulkarm on 10 December 2024, and in Tammoun, south of Tubas, on 24 December 2024.

On 7 January 2025, three militants, including a founder of the Tulkarm Brigade, were wounded after PA forces opened fire on their vehicle in Attil, north of Tulkarm. A similar PA attack against militants in Tulkarm occurred again on 12 January.

== Reactions ==
=== Palestinian militant organizations ===
Hamas, Palestinian Islamic Jihad, and the Popular Resistance Committees all condemned the Palestinian Authority's operation, including the killing of Jaayseh. Hamas official Abdul-Rahman Shadeed said that the PA must "strengthen the national cause" instead of suppressing anti-Israel militancy.

=== Israel ===
The IDF was reported to have "expressed satisfaction" with the course of the Jenin operation, and the Israeli security cabinet directed the IDF to bolster collaboration with the PA security forces on the recommendation of the Central Command.

An Israeli security source told Haaretz:

Jenin is now a microcosmos of the whole West Bank. If the PA sputters there, its control in the entire region is in danger. All told, the units have legitimization to act at the moment, despite the criticism of the Abu Mazen [Abbas] government. If they're successful in Jenin, it's likely that they will try to extend their activity to additional refugee camps in the north part of the West Bank. If they fail, or if we kick them out of there, that could signal the beginning of the end of their rule.

However, following discussions among Israeli security officials, IDF Chief of Staff Lieutenant General Herzi Halevi decided to recommend on 29 December that the Israeli government not approve transfers of weapons to the PA forces, as had been requested by the United States.
