= 2023 Ramot Junction attack =

Car-ramming attack in Jerusalem

- Part of the Israeli–Palestinian conflict
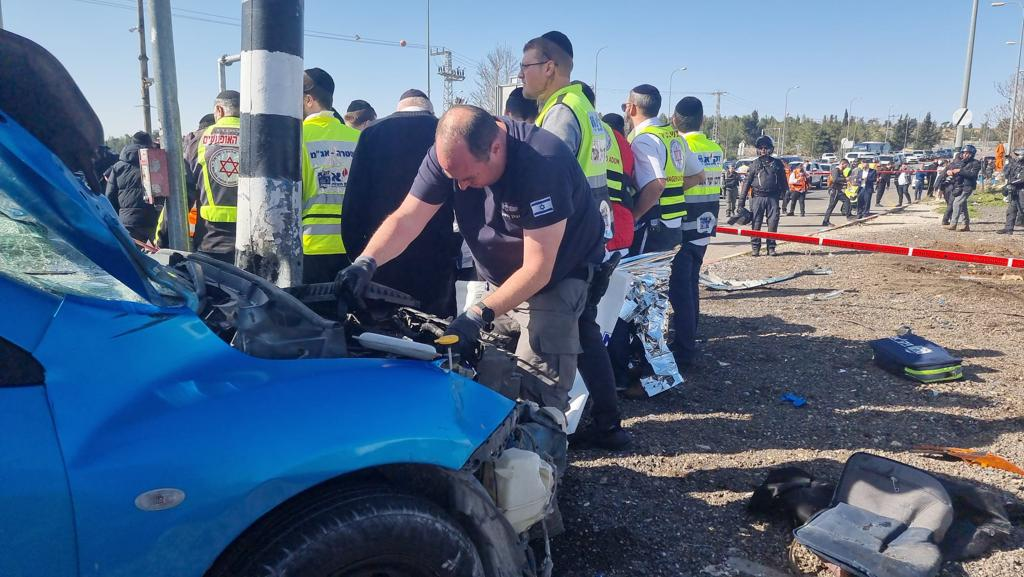
- An Israeli police officer examines the attacker's vehicle at the scene of the attack.

- The attack site
- Native name: פיגוע הדריסה בשכונת רמות
- Location: 31°49′31″N 35°11′19″E; Ramot, Jerusalem
- Date: 10 February 2023; 13:27 pm (UTC+2)
- Attack type: Vehicle-ramming attack
- Deaths: 3 victims, 1 perpetrator
- Injuries: 4 victims
- Perpetrator: Hussein Qaqawa

On 10 February 2023, three Israelis were killed, including two children aged 6 and 8, when a Palestinian man intentionally rammed his car into a bus stop where they, and several other families, were standing in Ramot, a neighborhood of Jerusalem. The 6 year old, Yaakov Israel Paley, and his 8-year-old brother, Asher Menachem Paley were struck when the assailant purposely accelerated his car into the bus stop. Another man, Alter Lederman, aged 20, who had recently gotten married, was also killed. Several other people, including children, were seriously injured. 8 year old Asher died in hospital the next day.

The assailant was shot dead at the scene by a police officer. Police labeled the attack as an act of terrorism.

Car ramming has increasingly become a terrorist weapon.

== Perpetrator ==
The attacker was identified as 31-year-old Palestinian citizen of Israel named Hussein Qaraqa, a resident of Isawiya. Social media (primarily Facebook) activity showed that Qaraqa had made statements in support of Palestinian militant groups such as Palestinian Islamic Jihad, Lions' Den. During the 2022 Gaza–Israel clashes he expressed his support for the PIJ. He regularly praised Palestinians who carried out attacks on Israelis, both soldiers and civilians.

Qaraqa had been released from a psychiatric hospital a few days prior to the attack. Israeli police arrested Qaraqa's relative and his brother for expressing their intention to carry out similar attacks.

== Reactions ==
Hamas and Islamic Jihad both praised the attack as "heroic". The Al-Aqsa Martyrs' Brigades, the armed wing of the West Bank's governing Fatah party also welcomed the attack.

In response, the Israeli cabinet approved the legalization of nine settlement outposts deep in the West Bank. Israeli authorities announced 300 bus stops will be fortified to prevent future attacks, while the Jerusalem municipality will later fortify an additional 700 stops in areas where the need is deemed less urgent. In addition, the Knesset passed a law to revoke Israeli citizenship of convicted terrorists who receive payments from the Palestinian Authority.

US Secretary of State Antony Blinken, who had recently visited Israel, said, "The deliberate targeting of innocent civilians is repugnant and unconscionable. We stand firmly with Israel in the face of this attack."

The United Arab Emirates' Ministry of Foreign Affairs issued a statement on its website, conveying condolences to Israel, strongly condemning the "terrorist attack", and rejecting "all forms of violence and terrorism aimed at undermining security and stability in contravention of human values and principles."

European Union Ambassador to Israel Dimiter Tzantchev tweeted his horror and sadness and stated that "the EU strongly and unequivocally condemns terrorism". UK Foreign Secretary James Cleverly and German Ambassador to Israel Steffen Seibert also issued public statements condemning the attack and extending their condolences to the families of the victims.

US Special Coordinator for the Middle East Peace Process, Tor Wennesland, called on all concerned parties to avoid actions that would "aggravate the situation on the ground" and instead protect "the prospect of a political solution to the mounting security crises."

== See also ==
- Timeline of the Israeli–Palestinian conflict in 2023
