= Ibn Sina Specialized Hospital =

Hospital in Jenin, Palestine

- Al Arab Hospitals Group Co. Ltd شركة المجمع الطبي العربي التخصصي الخاصة
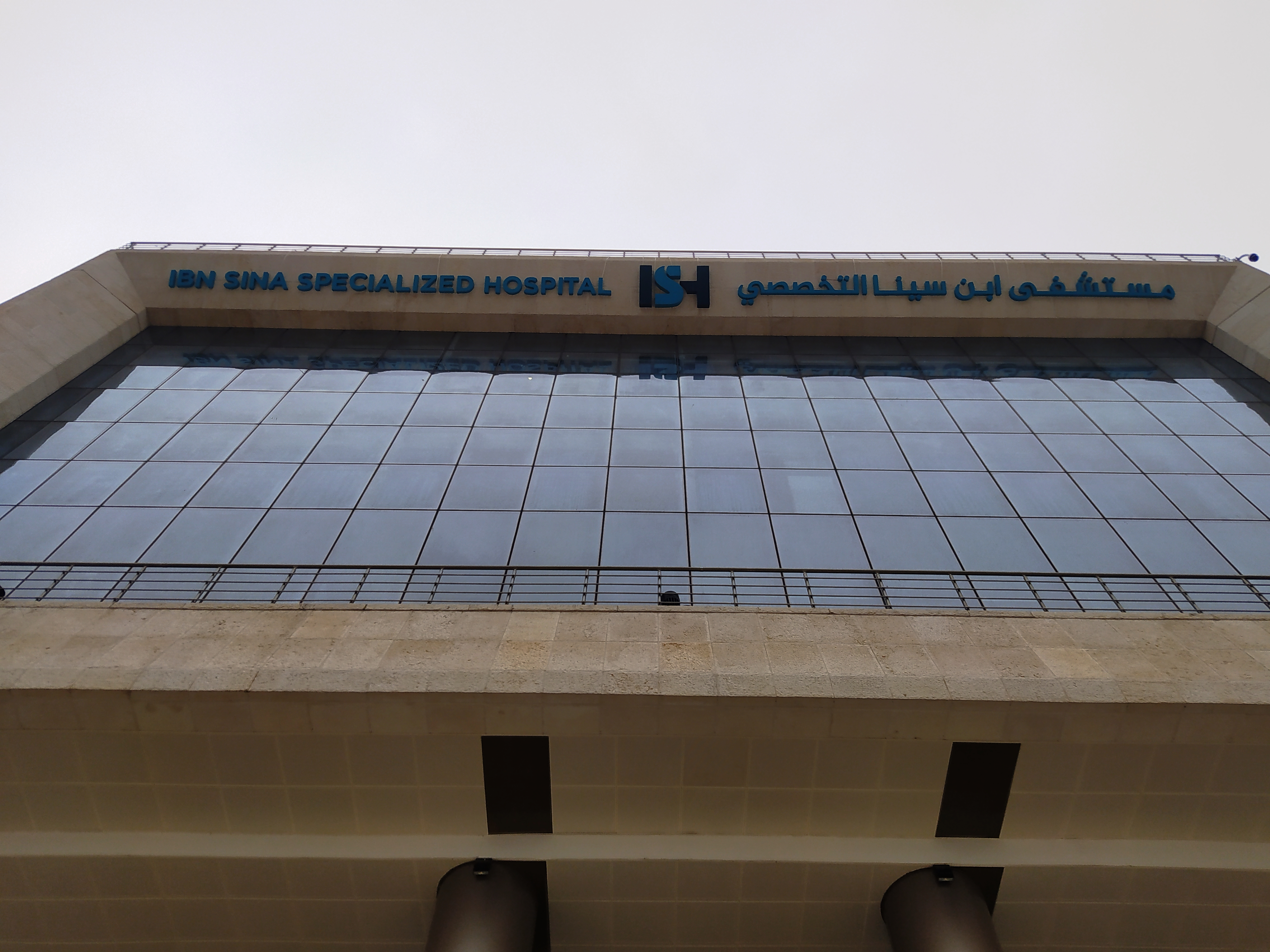

Geography
- Location: Jenin, Governorate, Palestine
- Coordinates: 32.4682°N 35.2870°E

Organisation
- Care system: Private (Ltd)
- Patron: Dr. Salem Abu Khaizaran (chairman)

Services
- Beds: 55

History
- Opened: October 11, 2021

Links
- Website: ish.ps

Ibn Sina Specialized Hospital (Arabic: مستشفى ابن سينا التخصصي) is a hospital of the Al Arab Hospitals Group Co. Ltd in Palestine. The hospital was opened on October 11, 2021 and located in the northern West Bank city of Jenin.

== Establishment ==
Al Arab Hospitals Group commenced its operations with the establishment of the Arab Specialized Hospital in Nablus in 1998. The group later expanded by inaugurating the Istishari Arab Hospital in Ramallah in 2016 and the Ibn Sina Specialized Hospital in Jenin in 2021.

On October 11, 2021, Prime Minister Mohammad Shtayyeh opened the Ibn Sina Specialized Hospital and toured it, inspected its workflow and held several meetings in the city of Jenin.

The State of Palestine, under the leadership of the President of the State of Palestine, has provided support to Al Arab Hospitals Group, assisting in its efforts to improve the Palestinian health sector.

== History ==
=== 2022 ===
Ibn Sina Hospital in Jenin became a focal point on the morning of May 11, 2022, as it played a critical role in responding to the death incident involving of Al Jazeera Arabic journalist Shireen Abu Akleh. Following her coverage of an IDF raid in Jenin camp, Shireen was transported to Ibn Sina Hospital, where medical professionals pronounced her dead. The hospital's role in this unfortunate event underscores its importance as a healthcare institution in the local community.

=== 2023 ===
The Palestinian News Agency announced that the Israeli force had targeted citizens with live bullets in front of the emergency department, and a military mechanism had also broken into the hospital square.

On November 17, 2023, Israeli soldiers surrounded at least four hospitals, including Ibn Sina Hospital, in the occupied West Bank. During a raid at Ibn Sina Hospital, medical staff were instructed to raise their hands and evacuate. Some doctors resisted evacuation, and two paramedics were reportedly arrested during the incident, as stated by Khairat.

=== 2024 ===
On January 29, Israeli special forces wearing civilian clothes assassinated three suspects of Palestinian youths after infiltrating Ibn Sina Hospital in Jenin.

The attack was widely condemned as a possible war crime. Aurel Sari and Tom Dannenbaum, both professors of International Law, called it a "violation of applicable laws". Dannenbaum said that it was a violation of "the prohibition on attacking combatants who have been incapacitated by wounds or sickness". The Economist and The Intercept separately wrote that the attack was "likely" or "probably" broke international law on the grounds of perfidy and the killing of protected people.

=== 2026 ===
Since June, Palestinian journalist Mujahid Bani Mufleh was treated at the hospital after falling into a coma. Following multiple surgeries, including removal of part of his skull, later he received assistance with walking, swallowing and speaking.
