= 2023 Huwara attacks =

Attacks in Huwara, West Bank

- Part of Israeli–Palestinian conflict and Israeli settler violence
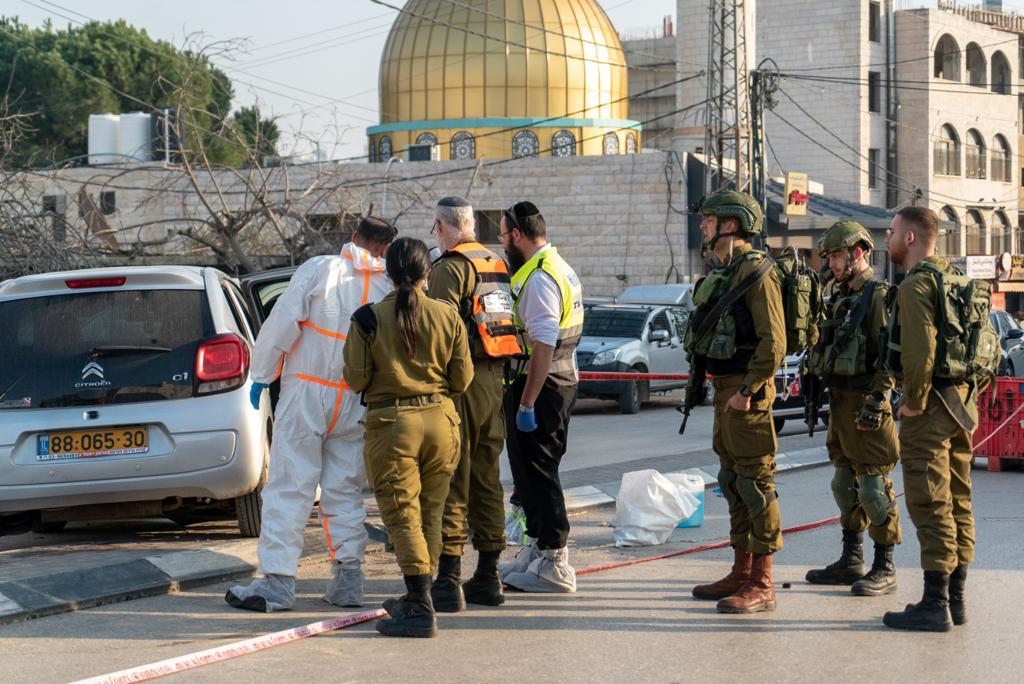
- Aftermath of shooting of Israelis
- Date: 26 February 2023
- Location: Huwara, Israeli-occupied West Bank; 32.1525°N 35.2567°E
- Methods: Shooting; riotss; arson; stabbings; armed assault
- Result: Destruction of property in Huwara; Deaths and injuries of Israelis and Palestinians

Parties
Palestinian civilians	Israeli settlers Israel Defense Forces
Hamas operative
Unknown gunman

Casualties and losses
2 dead (Note: Sameh Aqtash Abdel Fatah Hussein Khroushah); 99 injured or sickened by tear gas	4 dead

Casualties
- Arrested: 8 arrests of Israeli settlers (all released)

On 26 February 2023, Hamas operative Abdel Fattah Hussein Kharousha shot and killed two Israelis in their car in Huwara, a town south of Nablus in the Israeli-occupied West Bank. Following the shooting, Israeli settlers carried out revenge attacks, which killed at least one Palestinian and injured around 100 others. The Israel Defense Forces later killed Kharousha on 7 March during an operation in Jenin.

On 26 February 2023, hundreds of Israeli settlers went on a violent late-night rampage in Huwara and other Palestinian villages in the Israeli-occupied West Bank, leaving one civilian dead and 100 other Palestinians injured, four critically, and the town ablaze. It was the worst attack stemming from Israeli settler violence in the northern West Bank in decades. The rampage followed the deadly attack in which two Israelis were murdered the same day by an unidentified attacker in the area.

Israeli soldiers were in the area while the rampage by the settlers unfolded and did not intervene. The same day, Israeli and Palestinian officials issued a joint declaration in Aqaba, Jordan to counter the recent round of Israeli–Palestinian violence.

== Killing of Israelis ==
On 26 February 2023, four days after the incursion in Nablus, a gunman shot and killed two Israelis in a car near the Einbus intersection along Highway 60 in Huwara, south of Nablus. The attacker shot the two Israelis with an M16 rifle while they were driving and then fled the scene on foot. No group initially claimed responsibility for the shooting.

On March 7, an Israeli raid in Jenin killed the attacker, 49-year-old Abdel Fattah Hussein Kharousha, 3 militants of the Al-Aqsa Martyrs' Brigades, and two other Palestinian militants. Kharousha's three sons were also arrested. After his death, Hamas claimed responsibility for the attack and identified Kharousha, a fighter in the al-Qassam Brigades, its military wing, as the perpetrator. Large crowds accompanied Kharousha's coffin from the Rafidia Surgical Hospital in Nablus to his burial in the Askar Camp, east of Nablus.

Kharousha was born in 1974. After joining the Qassam Brigades, he was arrested multiple times by Israel, and was released at the end of 2022 after serving 40 months in prison.

During a 3 April raid in Nablus, the Israel Defense Forces (IDF) arrested Izz al-Din Touqan and Nidal Tabanja, who it accused of assisting the Huwara attacker. The IDF killed two Palestinian militants, Mohammad Nasser Al-Saeed (also rendered Mohammad Saeed Nasser) and Mohammad Abu Baker Al-Junaidi, during the operation after militants opened fire on the IDF. Palestinian militant group The Lions' Den identified Al-Saeed as one of its fighters.

=== Victims ===
Later on the same day, groups of Israeli settlers rioted in the region, carrying out revenge attacks. One Palestinian man was fatally shot in the abdomen in neighboring Za'tara. An analysis by journalists for +972 Magazine of 14 videos of the assault conducted by 40–50 settlers, who had returned to Za'tara after being repulsed the first time, concluded that the simultaneous attack on Za'atara in which Sameh Aqtesh was shot dead was conducted under Israeli army escort. In Huwara itself, 98 Palestinians were injured as settlers torched Palestinian homes.

The two Israelis killed in the shooting were brothers named Hillel Menachem Yaniv and Yagel Ya’acov Yaniv. They were from the Har Brakha settlement, and were described as yeshiva students. One of the brothers had just completed his service in the Israeli Navy.

Following a lawsuit by the Yaniv family, Israel seized $5.2 million in funds for the Palestinian Authority (PA) under the 2024 Compensation for Terror Victims Law. Under the law, heirs of victims are entitled to compensation of $2.6 million per victim. The lawsuit targeted the PA's payments of stipends to militants and their families.

== Settler rampage ==
Some 700,000 Israeli settlers now live in the West Bank and East Jerusalem, in settlements viewed as illegal by the international community. Hardline settlers in the West Bank more generally frequently commit violence against Palestinians and vandalize Palestinian land and property, but rarely on the scale of the rampage in Huwara.

The rampage in Huwara followed shortly after the deadly shooting by a Palestinian gunman of two Israeli settlers from Har Brakha, an Israeli settlement near Huwara, earlier the same day. Settler violence had generally been steadily on the rise in the West Bank in recent months, with Huwara previously having been subjected to an October blockade imposed by settlers and backed by Israeli soldiers. In the first two months of 2023, intercommunal violence led to the killings of 62 Palestinians and 14 Israelis. The year of 2022 was the deadliest for Palestinians living in the West Bank and East Jerusalem since 2004, according to B’Tselem, with nearly 150 Palestinians and 30 Israelis killed.

On the night of 26 February 2023, hundreds of Israeli settlers attacked Huwara and three nearby villages, torching hundreds of Palestinian homes (some with people in them), businesses, a school, and numerous vehicles. One Palestinian man was shot dead.

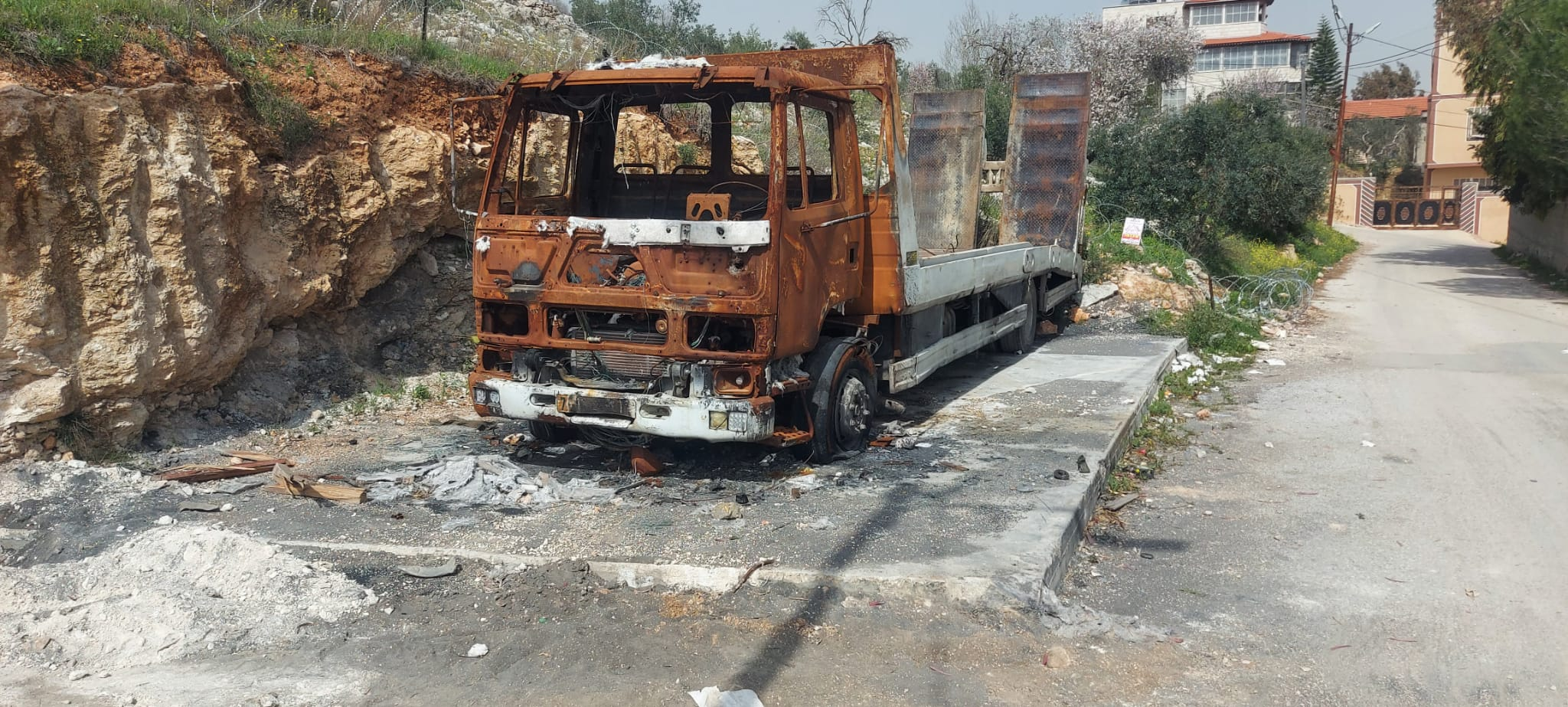

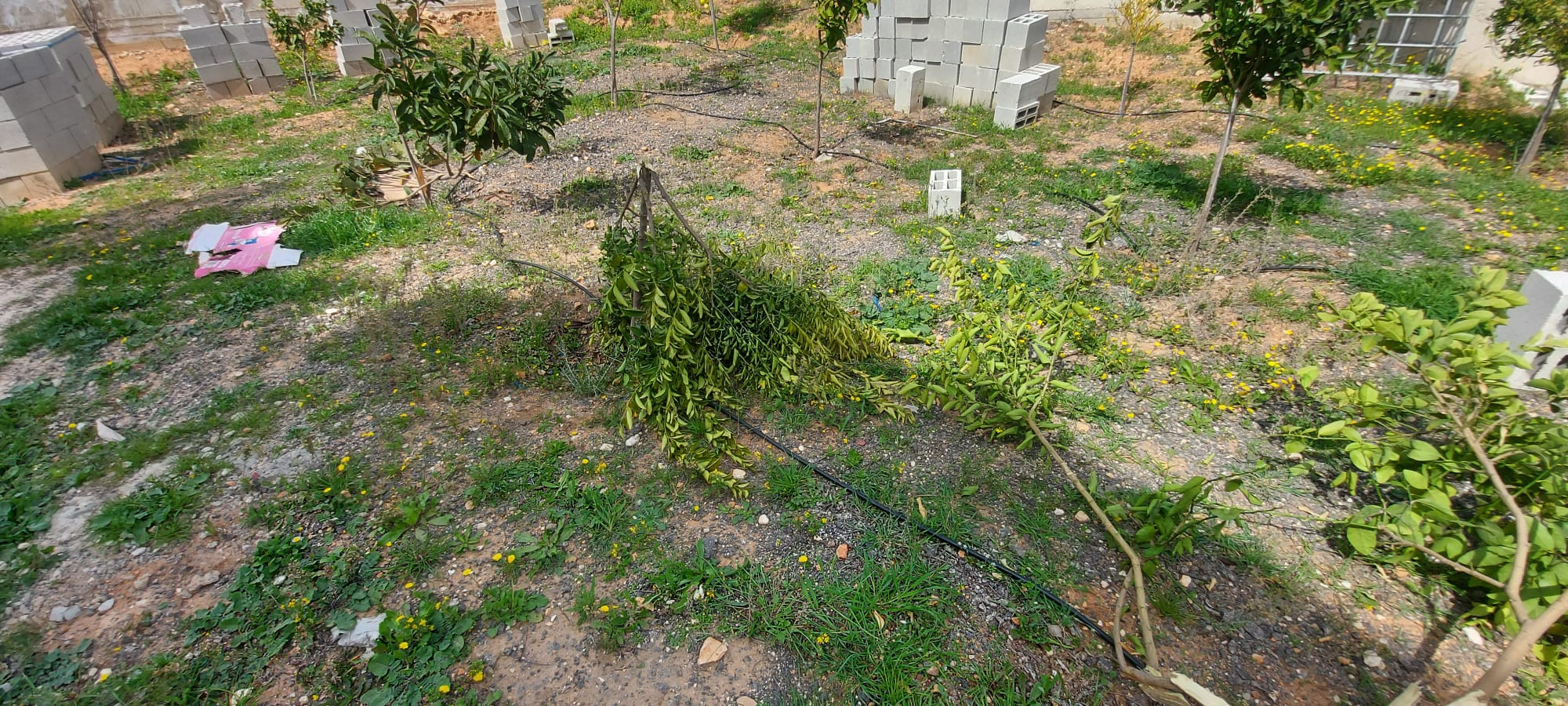
Damaged property as result of the rampage

Although the violence had been anticipated, and the Israeli military had cordoned off the area, the soldiers remained on the sidelines during the siege and did not intervene. Israel's West Bank army commander defended the inaction, saying that they had not anticipated the ferocity of the attack and were not prepared to deal with it. He described the event as "a pogrom done by outlaws"—a term commonly applied to eastern European mob attacks upon Jews during the 1800s and early 1900s.

The Palestinian health ministry said a 37-year-old man was shot to death by the settlers, while the Palestinian Red Crescent medical service said another two people were wounded by gunfire, a third was stabbed and a fourth beaten with an iron bar. Ninety-five others were said to be suffering from teargas inhalation.

Alongside the physical violence against local residents, the settlers set fire to approximately 30 homes and cars, according to one source. Other sources say 200 buildings were set ablaze in four Palestinian villages. Social media showed large blazes burning across the town and the violence reportedly lasted throughout the night and continued on into Monday morning.

== Aftermath ==
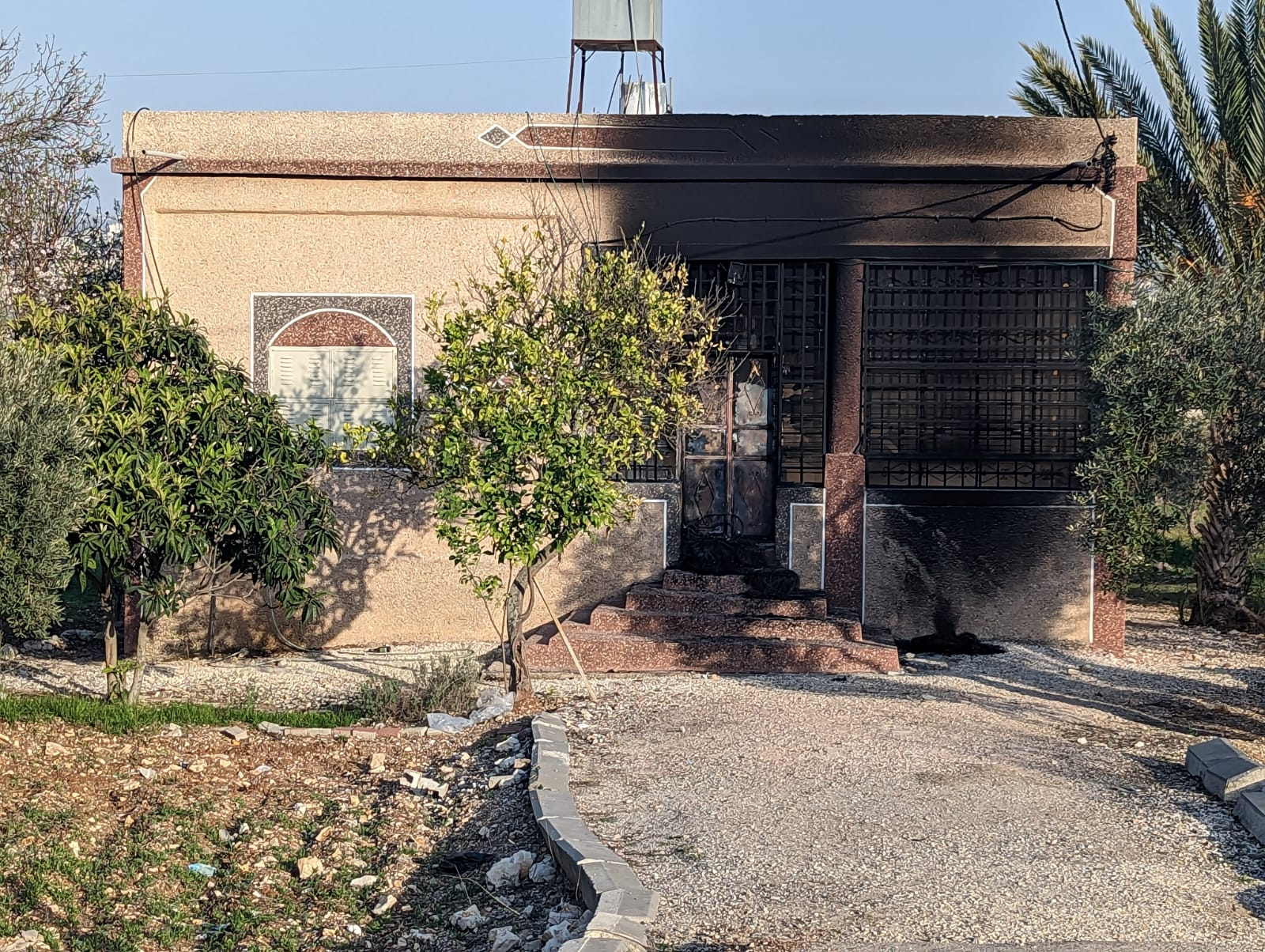
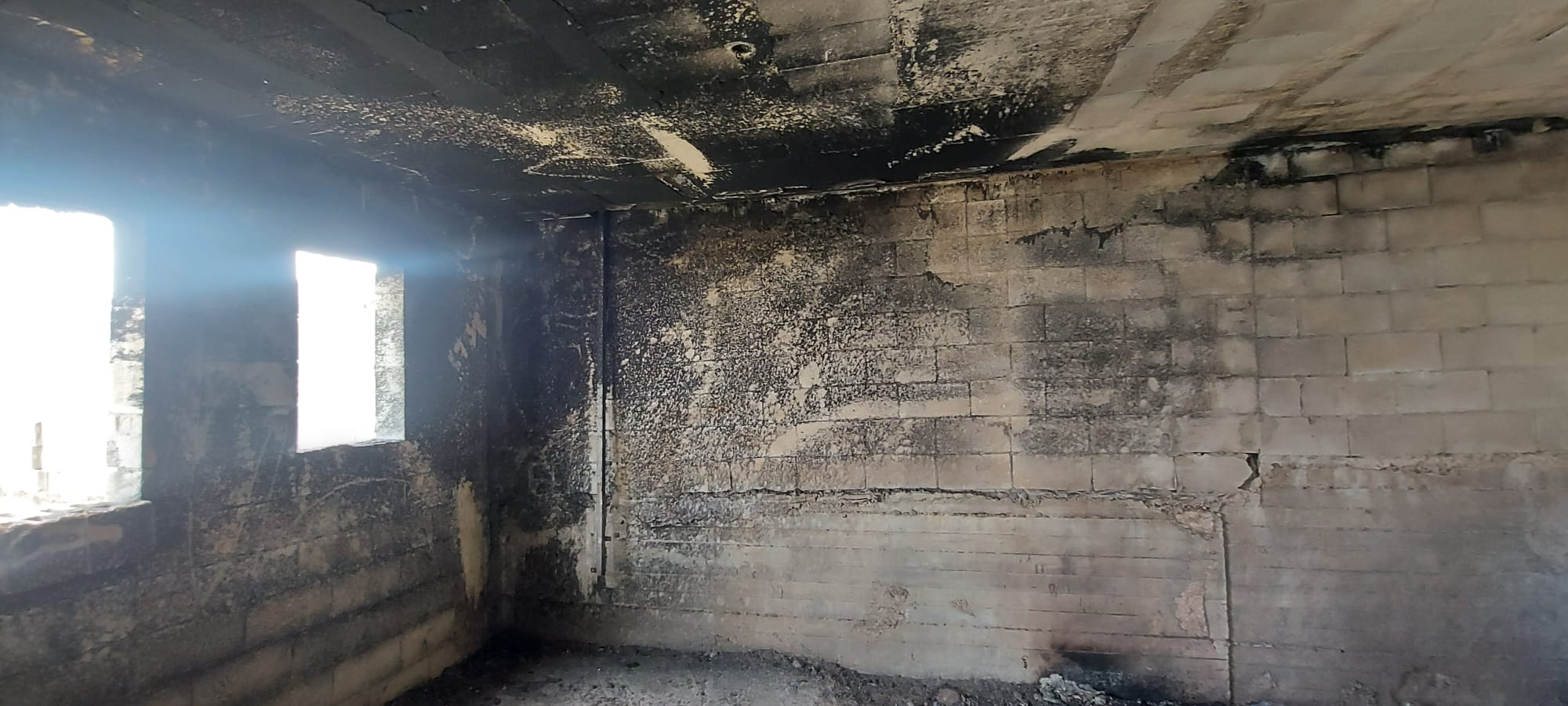

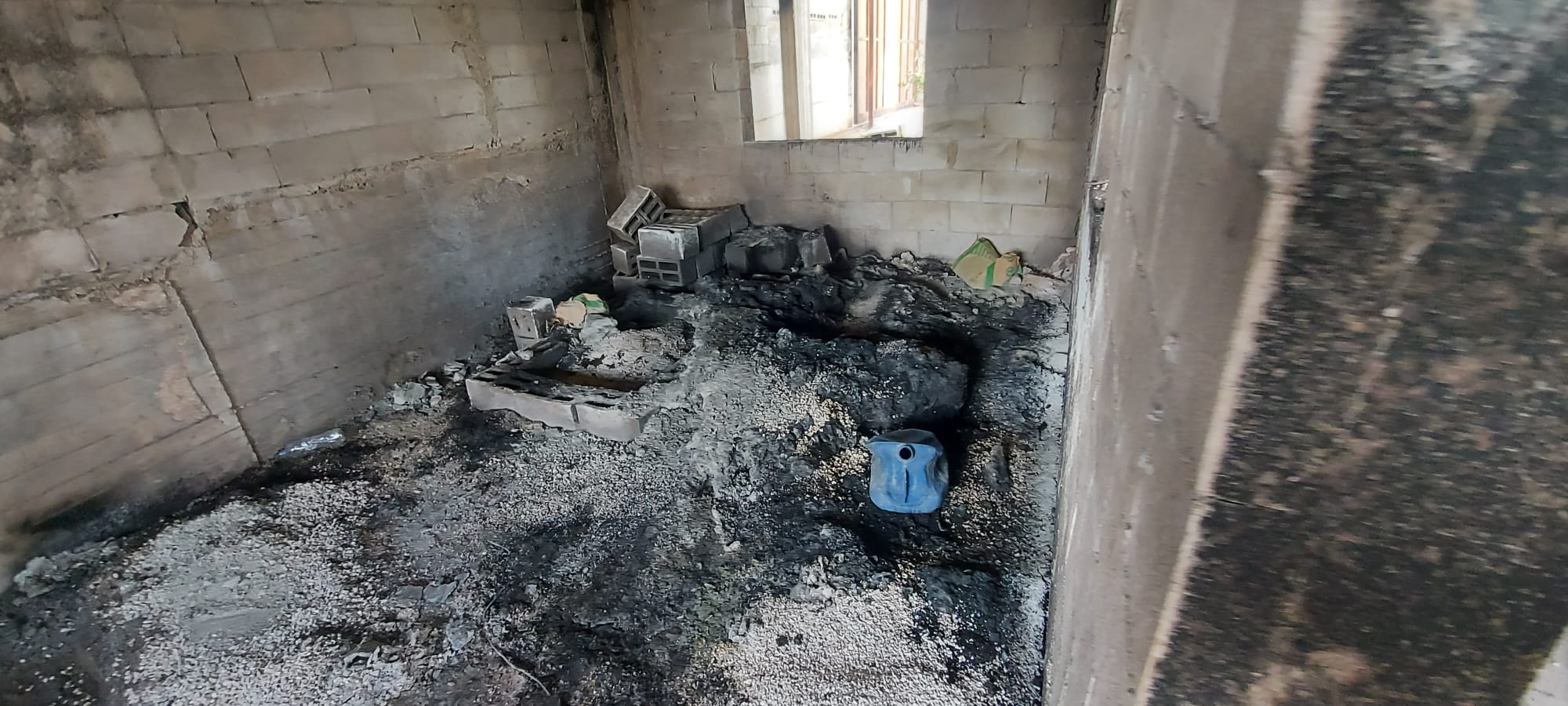
A burnt house in Huwara following the event

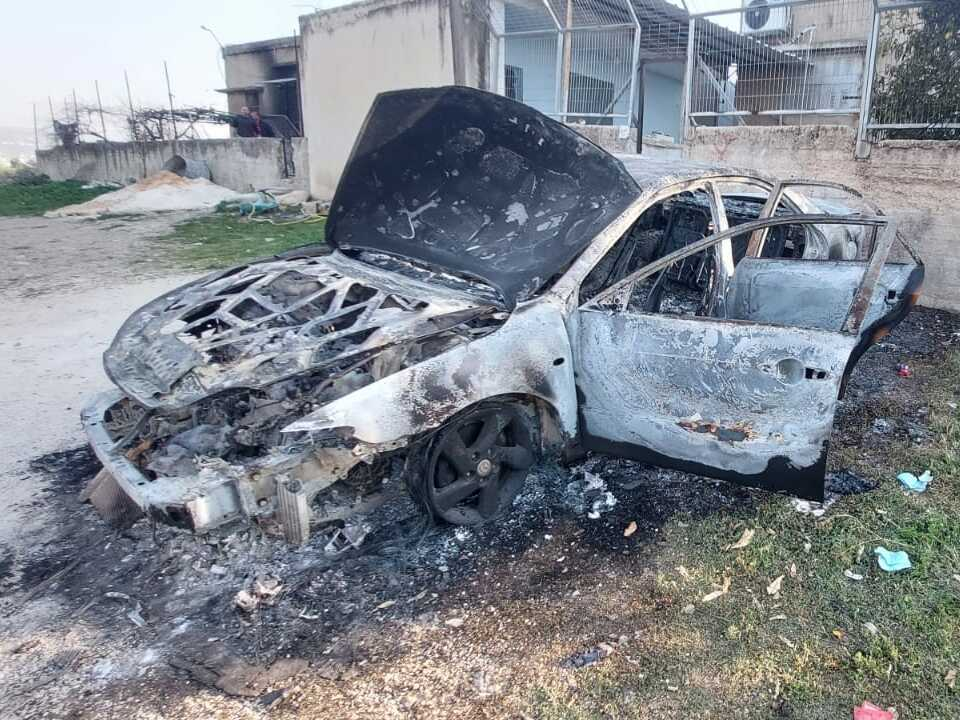
A car set on fire by settlers

The day after the rampage, the rampagers were still in control of the area and groups of masked Jews checked vehicles looking for Palestinians. Israeli soldiers nearby did not intervene. "Reports of a large Israeli army presence in the town existed only on paper". Settler attacks on Palestinian communities continued through 28 February.

As of 28 February, of only eight suspects detained in connection with the rampage, all had been released, three to house arrest. On 1 March, eight further suspects believed to have taken part in the assault were arrested, one of whom was released the same day. The IDF commander responsible for the area, Major-General Yehuda Fox, described the event as a "pogrom carried out by outlaws." On 2 March, the Israeli Defense Ministry placed two of the individuals, one a minor, in administrative detention after a Jerusalem court ordered the police to release the remaining seven detained suspects.

In June 2023, a joint FakeReporter and CNN investigation of the rampage revealed that the IDF took little action during the rampage.

== Reactions ==
=== Israeli ===
Israeli Prime Minister Benjamin Netanyahu appealed for calm on Sunday evening as footage of the violence emerged and spoke out against vigilantism. Israeli President Isaac Herzog condemned the rampage, stating, "This is not our way. It is criminal violence against innocents."

Israeli Finance Minister Bezalel Smotrich, a settler leader now largely in charge of the administration of the West Bank, who had earlier called for "striking the cities of terror and its instigators without mercy, with tanks and helicopters", appealed to the settlers not to take the law into their own hands, and to let the army and government do their jobs.

However, Smotrich later called on Twitter for Huwara to be "wiped out" by the Israeli government. Smotrich's remark drew international condemnation, including from the U.N. Secretary General, Jordan, the United Arab Emirates, and others. The United States State Department demanded Netanyahu reject the remark. Smotrich's remark came just ahead of a major fundraising event for Israel in the U.S., where Smotrich was set to appear. The White House indicated U.S. officials would not meet with him, and various Jewish rights organizations called for the State Department to deny him entry.

Other members of Israel's ruling coalition offered other sentiments. Zvika Fogel, of the ultra-nationalist Otzma Yehudit, said he saw the violence "in a very good light" in response to a question on Army Radio in which the interviewer referred to the rampage as a 'pogrom'. After the IDF killed Kharousha and others on 7 March, Palestinian factions called for an escalation of "armed resistance" and revenge.

==== Investigation ====
On 1 March, Israeli Attorney General Gali Baharav-Miara opened an investigation into lawmaker Zvika Fogel of the far-right Otzma Yehudit party and a member of the Israeli government coalition on "suspicion of incitement to terrorism"; Fogel had publicly supported the rampage. 22 Israeli legal experts wrote to the attorney general to investigate pro-settler government MKs, including far-right minister Bezalel Smotrich, for "inducing war crimes" by their public support for the riots. Going further, Smotrich, when asked why he liked a tweet by Samaria Regional Council deputy mayor Davidi Ben Zion calling "to wipe out the village of Huwara today", said "Because I think the village of Huwara needs to be wiped out. I think the State of Israel should do it."

=== Palestinian ===
Palestinian President Mahmoud Abbas criticized events as "the terrorist acts carried out by settlers under the protection of the occupation forces tonight," and blamed the Israeli government. One Palestinian witness said the event was "one of the most shocking attacks on Palestinian civilians from Israeli settlers in recent years", referred to it as a "pogrom", and called for the international community "to stop supporting Israel until it ends its military occupation."

By the evening of 26 February, Israeli and Palestinian officials released a joint statement emphasizing "the importance of de-escalation on the ground and preventing further violence." Israel pledged not to approve new housing units in the West Bank for four months. The two parties agreed to examine the renewal of security cooperation and to establish a joint committee to explore economic measures Israel could take for the Palestinians. The attack came juxtaposed against a joint declaration earlier that day in Aqaba, Jordan, by Israeli and Palestinian officials expressing a desire to work towards calming the latest round of violence.

=== International ===
The European Union noted its alarm at the violence called on authorities on both sides "stop this endless cycle of violence." The UK ambassador to Israel called on Israel to address the settler violence and bring those responsible to justice.

US State Department spokesman Ned Price said violence underscored "the imperative to immediately de-escalate tensions in words and deeds."

CNN published an investigation on June 15 finding that Israeli forces both failed to stop the riots nor protect residents against settler violence. A soldier told the network that soldiers and border police did nothing, "We just let them continue to advance".

== See also ==
- Timeline of the Israeli–Palestinian conflict in 2023
- Israeli settler violence
