= February 2023 Nablus incursion =

Israeli military operation in the West Bank

2023 Nablus clash
- Part of the Israeli–Palestinian conflict
- Date: February 22, 2023
- Location: Nablus, West Bank

Parties
Israel; (Israel) Israeli Defence Forces	Lions' Den (Palestine) Nablus Brigade (Palestine) Balata Brigade

Casualties
- Deaths: 11
- Injuries: 102

On 22 February 2023, Israel conducted a military incursion into the Palestinian city of Nablus. After an undercover unit located the house in which two militants were believed to be residing, a firefight broke out, resulting in the deaths of 3 militants. Fighting between Israeli reinforcements and other militants left 4 suspected militants and 4 other Palestinians dead. A further 102 people suffered injuries.

Separate investigations by the New York Times and the Washington Post showed Israeli forces targeting and shooting at civilians. The Israeli military said the events were being investigated.

== Event ==
A month after a similar raid in the Jenin refugee camp and another on February 6 in the Aqabat Jabr refugee camp in Jericho city, in an operation that began around dawn, an Israeli special operations group managed to enter Nablus and penetrate as far as the Old City. Their stated aim was to search for members of the Lions' Den group. Some hours later, they identified two of the youths they were hunting, Husam Bassam Isleem (24) and Muhammad Omar “Juneidi” Abu Bakr (23), as they walked into the Habalah Quarter of the town. Around 10 a.m. a firefight broke out between the Israeli unit and the two men holed up in the house. Around 20 minutes later, the undercover squad called for reinforcements, whereupon an estimated 50 military vehicles, with around 150 soldiers, launched a large-scale foray into the city while blocking off all entries and exits. As fire was exchanged, at some point, a third fighter, Waleed Dakhil (23), managed to join Juneidi and Isleem. All three were killed. Elsewhere in the city, other militants from the Nablus and Balata Brigades were shot dead during confrontations with Israeli forces. The Israeli troops began their retreat at 1:30 pm, leaving considerable evidence of widespread damage wherever they had been operating.

Of the 11 killed, one person dying on the following day, seven were identified as militants. Three elderly men, Adnan Sabe Bara (72); Abdelhadi Abed Aziz Al-Ashqar (61), and Anan Shawkat Anna (66), also died, the last of side-effects of tear gas intoxication the day after. The fourth civilian casualty was a boy, Mohammad Farid Shaaban (16). Overall some 102 people were injured, 82 of whom having been shot by live ammunition from Israeli gunfire. Six people are reported to be in critical condition.

The Palestinian Health ministry said that dozens were being treated for bullet wounds, some critical. Two of the dead were said to be the subject of the arrest operation and killed following the Israeli forces demolition of the building they were occupying. The Health ministry also said that two journalists were lightly injured by live fire.

== Aftermath ==
The Biden administration joined a growing number of governments condemning what the IDF said was a counter-terrorism operation and the Palestinian Authority again called on the United Nations Security Council to act. A general strike the next day was declared in the West Bank to mourn the victims of what the Palestinians describe as a massacre. Subsequently, six rockets were fired from the Gaza Strip and Israel responded with air raids on Gaza. Many countries issued statements condemning the incursion and others expressing concern about the violence, including Algeria, Bahrain, Egypt, Germany, Iran, Lebanon, Kuwait, Oman, Qatar, Saudi Arabia, and Turkey, the UAE, and Yemen.

On 1 March 2023, the New York Times published an analysis of videos covering the timeframe of the incursion. While three targets in a safe house and another gunman were killed, videos show that "Israeli soldiers used deadly force against unarmed Palestinians, killing at least four people who did not appear to pose a threat". The military said that "the circumstances" of the raid were under examination.

On 10 March 2023, the Washington Post published a visual reconstruction that showed that "while responding to what they claimed was a gunman, Israeli forces fired at least 14 times from inside their armored vehicle as it moved down a street and then came to a halt next to a short wall behind which [the] civilians huddled. The Israelis continued firing even after those people would have been visible from the vehicle’s windows, the analysis shows." The military said the matter is "under examination."

== See also ==
- Timeline of the Israeli–Palestinian conflict in 2023
- April 2023 Nablus incursion
