= Ultrasawt =

Arabic media network

Ultrasawt الترا صوت
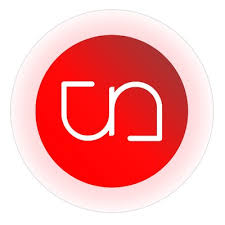
- Type: online
- Editor-in-chief: Izzeddin Araj
- Founded: 2015; 11 years ago
- Language: Arabic
- Website: www.ultrasawt.com

Ultrasawt (Arabic: الترا صوت) is an Arabic media network founded in 2015. It publishes content in Arabic curated from a pool of journalists and writers from different Arab countries and maintains the media outlet UltraPalestine.

Ultrasawt publishes a series of localised sub-sites (each prefixed 'Ultra') with a focus on engaging Arab audiences in specific countries, including Palestine, Tunisia, Sudan, Algeria, and Iraq.

== Censorship ==
The website has been banned in several Arab countries, including Egypt, United Arab Emirates, Saudi Arabia, and lately in Palestine. The Palestinian authorities blocked the website and 58 other websites, claiming that they publish images and media that "threaten national security and civil peace, disturb public order and morals and inflame Palestinian public opinion". The Committee to Protect Journalists (CPJ) issued a statement condemning blocking the website, and accusing the authorities of "denying Palestinians their right to receive information from a variety of sources". The move to block the websites was also condemned by Reporters Without Borders.
