= Palestinian militias in the West Bank =

Palestinian armed groups

A variety of local Palestinian militias have been formed in the West Bank to fight against Israel, which has occupied the region since 1967. These militias have taken on primarily defensive roles, engaging the Israel Defense Forces (IDF) during its raids into the West Bank's Palestinian enclaves, while also occasionally conducting offensive operations against Israeli military outposts, checkpoints, and settlers.

== Structure and characteristics ==
While some of the West Bank militias are independently functioning (such as Lions' Den), the majority operate semi-autonomously under existing Palestinian militant organizations– namely Palestinian Islamic Jihad (PIJ), Al-Aqsa Martyrs' Brigades, and Hamas. Typically, the militias call themselves kata'ib (كَتَائِب), (Note: singular: katibat (كَتِيبَة)) which can be translated to "brigades" or "battalions", such as in the case of the Jenin Brigades and the Tulkarm Brigade, which have also been called the Jenin Battalion and the Tulkarm Battalion, respectively.

Many of the semi-autonomous groups are "cross-factional", simultaneously shared between the three factions. For example, the Jenin Brigades initially began as the Jenin branch of the Al-Quds Brigades, the armed wing of PIJ, but soon evolved to encompass militants from various factions; the immediate objective of defending against IDF raids took priority over any ideology. Nonetheless, PIJ remains the most popular faction in the West Bank, and boasts a greater number of brigades/battalions compared to the Al-Aqsa Martyrs' Brigades or Hamas. The other prominent Palestinian militant organizations– the Popular Front for the Liberation of Palestine, the Democratic Front for the Liberation of Palestine, the Popular Resistance Committees, and the Palestinian Mujahideen Movement– do not formally have any branches in the West Bank, but have still carried out some attacks in the region.

The "hyper-localized" nature of the West Bank militias is a significant departure from traditional, centralized model of Palestinian resistance against Israel, consisting of political parties and their armed wings, which undertook militant operations to support their respective party's political objectives.

The militias receive broad popular support from the local Palestinians. They exert de facto control over the Jenin refugee camp, the Tulkarm refugee camp, and the Nablus refugee camp, but are present throughout the West Bank.

== Background, causes, and spread ==
Following the Second Intifada (2000–2005) and the resulting decline of traditional Palestinian militant factions under the Shin Bet's pressure, more decentralized models of militancy involving small armed cells and breakaway factions began emerging. Compared to the Second Intifada, less militant violence in the West Bank occurred over the following years, culled by both Israel and the autonomous Palestinian Authority (PA) under Mahmoud Abbas.

Proper local militias in the region began springing up in 2021–2022. Several factors drove this:

- The 2021 Sheikh Jarrah evictions in East Jerusalem and the 2021 Israel–Palestine crisis, and popular anger over the inaction of the PA during these events
- The start of the Israeli "Operation Break the Wave" in March 2022, involving more than 2,000 IDF raids into the West Bank and killing more than 200 people
- Heightened Israeli settler violence
- The November 2022 Israeli election, which returned Benjamin Netanyahu to power as the prime minister of Israel and as head of a far-right government (described as the most right-wing in Israeli history), which oversaw an escalation in raids into the West Bank
- Continued mass discontent with the general weakness and complicity of the PA in the Israeli occupation

As a result, many young Palestinian men in the West Bank began taking up arms, aiming to defend their communities. Between 2021 and 2022, several new militias in the region were formed, including the Jenin Brigades, the Tulkarm Brigade, the Nablus Brigade, the Tubas Brigade, and Lions' Den.

== Conflict with Israel ==
Fighting between the militias and the IDF is frequent, at a pace that has only escalated since the beginning of the ongoing Gaza war on 7 October 2023. Even before the start of the war, "political violence" in the West Bank was up by 50% between October 2022 and September 2023, with notable battles such as the July 2023 Jenin incursion.

Near-daily IDF incursions have been described as turning the West Bank into a "war zone", and consist of both air and ground maneuvers against militant targets which frequently leave civilians trapped in the middle. Militants in the West Bank, however say the Gaza war has only given them more momentum and encouragement, and Israel has not been able to significantly degrade the militias' capabilities. The situation has been described as "a classic case of insurgency" where "an entrenched local resistance leverages its intimate knowledge of the geography of the camp, strong community support, and adaptive tactics to counter a more conventionally powerful military opponent."

On 28 August 2024, Israel launched "Operation Summer Camps", a large-scale military operation in the West Bank against the militias. It was Israel's largest military operation in the region in more than 20 years since its Operation Defensive Shield in 2002. Israeli foreign minister Israel Katz referred to the operation as a "full-fledged war" focused on stamping out "terrorist infrastructures", accusing Iran of trying to establish an "eastern terrorist front" against Israel in the West Bank by funding and arming the militias.

Later, in January 2025, Israel launched an even larger offensive, titled "Iron Wall", in the West Bank, which marks a strategically distinct and more aggressive approach against Palestinian militancy there compared to previous Israeli raids.

Some militants from the West Bank have also launched attacks inside Israel.

== Conflict with the Palestinian Authority ==
West Bank militias have also engaged in conflict with the Palestinian Authority, which governs the Palestinian enclaves autonomously under the Israeli occupation.

The PA, which suffers from a "legitimacy crisis", is widely perceived as just another arm of the Israeli occupation by most Palestinians. It has a shared interested with Israel in suppressing militancy, and cooperation between the PA security forces and the IDF is reflected by the fact that the former have simply remained in their barracks during IDF raids and have actively interfered with militants' defenses against those raids.

== See also ==
- Palestinian nationalism
- Palestinian political violence
- Guerrilla warfare
- Palestinian Joint Operations Room
