= Rafidia Surgical Hospital =

Hospital in Nablus, West Bank, Palestine

Rafidia Surgical Hospital مستشفى رفيديا الجراحي الحكومي
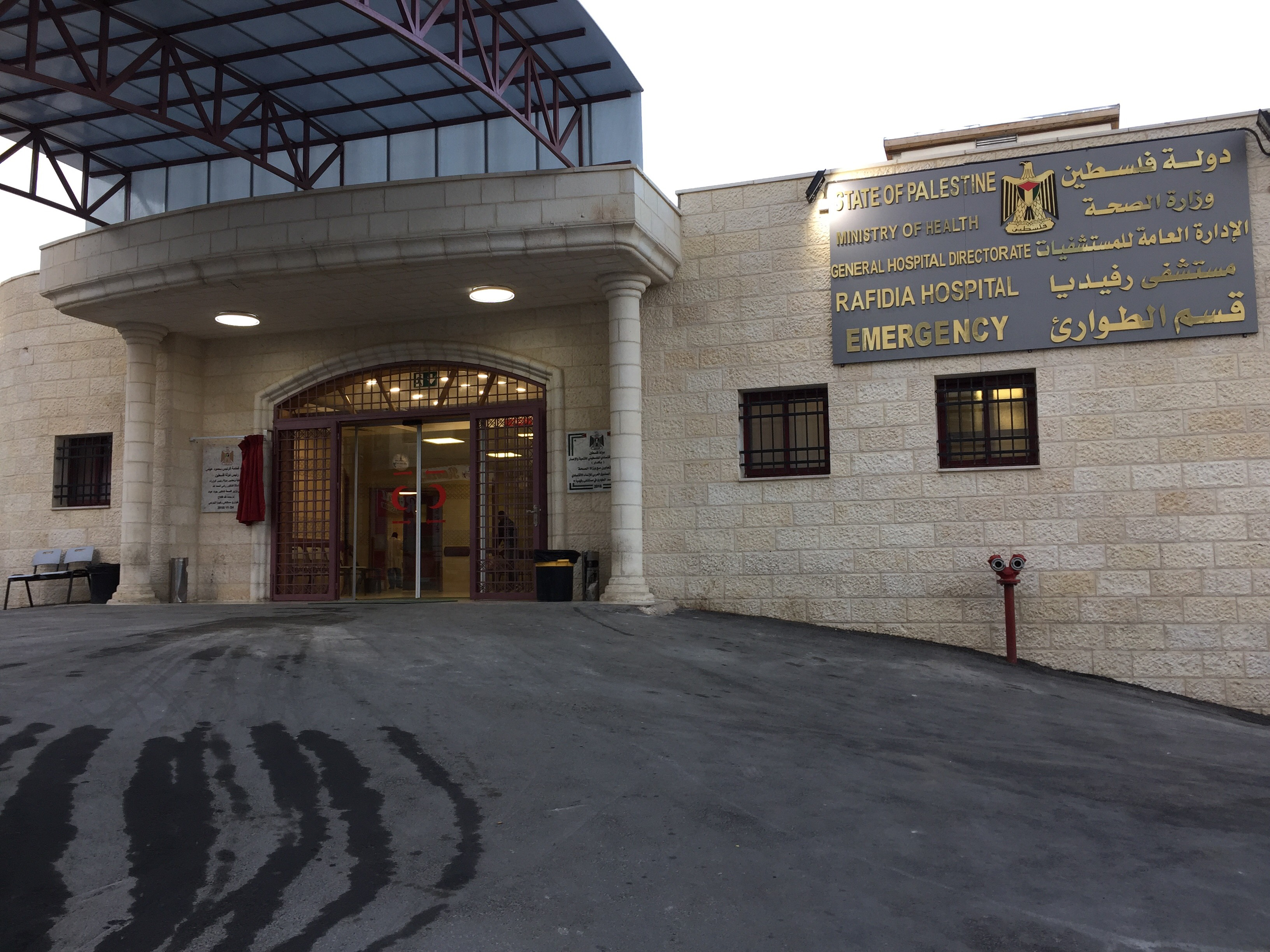

Geography
- Location: Nablus, Nablus Governorate, West Bank, Palestine
- Coordinates: 32.2253°N 35.2414°E

Services
- Emergency department: Yes
- Beds: 200

History
- Founded: 1976

Rafidia Surgical Hospital (Arabic: مستشفى رفيديا الجراحي الحكومي) is a government hospital in Nablus, West Bank, Palestine, operated by the Palestinian Ministry of Health. It was built in 1976 and has 200 surgical beds. It employs 628 staff, including a doctor, nurse, pharmacist, physiotherapist, laboratory technician, radiologist and others.
