= Jenin Brigades =

Palestinian armed group (e. 2021)

- كتيبة جنين
- Founder: Jamil Al-Amouri †
- Founded: 2021
- Headquarters: Jenin, West Bank, Palestine
- Ideology: Palestinian nationalism
- Part of: Al-Quds Brigades; Al-Aqsa Martyrs' Brigades al-Qassam Brigades

The Jenin Brigades (Arabic: كتائب جنين, romanized: Katāʾib Ǧinīn), also referred to as the Jenin Battalion or Jenin Brigade, is a Palestinian militant group in the West Bank. It was founded in Jenin in 2021 by Jamil Al-Amouri, a militant of the Palestinian Islamic Jihad (PIJ). The organization is based in the Jenin refugee camp in the North of the West Bank. Like most other West Bank militias, the Jenin Brigades are an umbrella formation affiliated with PIJ, Hamas, and the al-Aqsa Martyrs' Brigades.

The Jenin Brigades have engaged in armed skirmishes with Israeli forces. They claim they "are the resistance". They call for armed resistance against Israel and for the Palestinian authorities to take part in the movement.

== History and background ==
The Jenin Brigades, believed to be established in the Jenin refugee camp by Jamil al-Amouri before his death in June 2021, were first reported following their participation in the escape of Palestinian prisoners from the Israeli Gilboa prison on the 6th of September 2021. The brigades also took part in the kidnapping of the body of Tiran Fero, a 17-year-old Israeli Druze, on November 23, 2022.

During the ongoing Gaza war and its spillover into the West Bank, they have repeatedly clashed with Israeli forces conducting incursions into Jenin. The Brigades also participated in the July 2024 West Bank unrest against the Palestinian Authority. In December 2024, the Palestinian Authority launched an operation into Jenin to combat the Jenin Brigades, which ultimately merged into an Israeli offensive targeting the group.

== Notable members ==
- Jamil Al-Amouri: the founder of the Jenin Brigades.
- Mateen Dabaya: a leader of the group killed in October 2022, at the age of 20, during a military operation carried out by the Israeli forces in the Jenin refugee camp.
- Nour al-Bitawi: a Brigades commander who was killed in Nablus in a raid by Israeli forces in May 2025.
- Omar Al-Saadi: a co-founder of the Brigades who was killed by Israeli forces in January 2023, following confrontations.
- Wassem Hazem: led the Al-Qassam members in the Jenin Brigades and was killed by the Israeli Border Police near the town of Zababdeh, during Israel's 2024 operation in the West Bank.
- Yazid Jaayseh: a Brigades commander killed by Palestinian Authority forces in December 2024, during their Jenin operation.
- Qais al Saa'di: a Brigades commander who fought against Palestinian Authority forces during their Jenin operation.

== Attacks ==
- Kidnapping of Tiran Fero, a 17-year old Israeli Druze student
- 2025 al-Funduq shooting

== See also ==
- Lions' Den (militant group)
- Timeline of the Israeli–Palestinian conflict in 2022
