= Za'tara, Nablus =

Za'tara
- Za'tara, Nablus

Arabic transcription(s)
  - Arabic: زعترة، نابلس
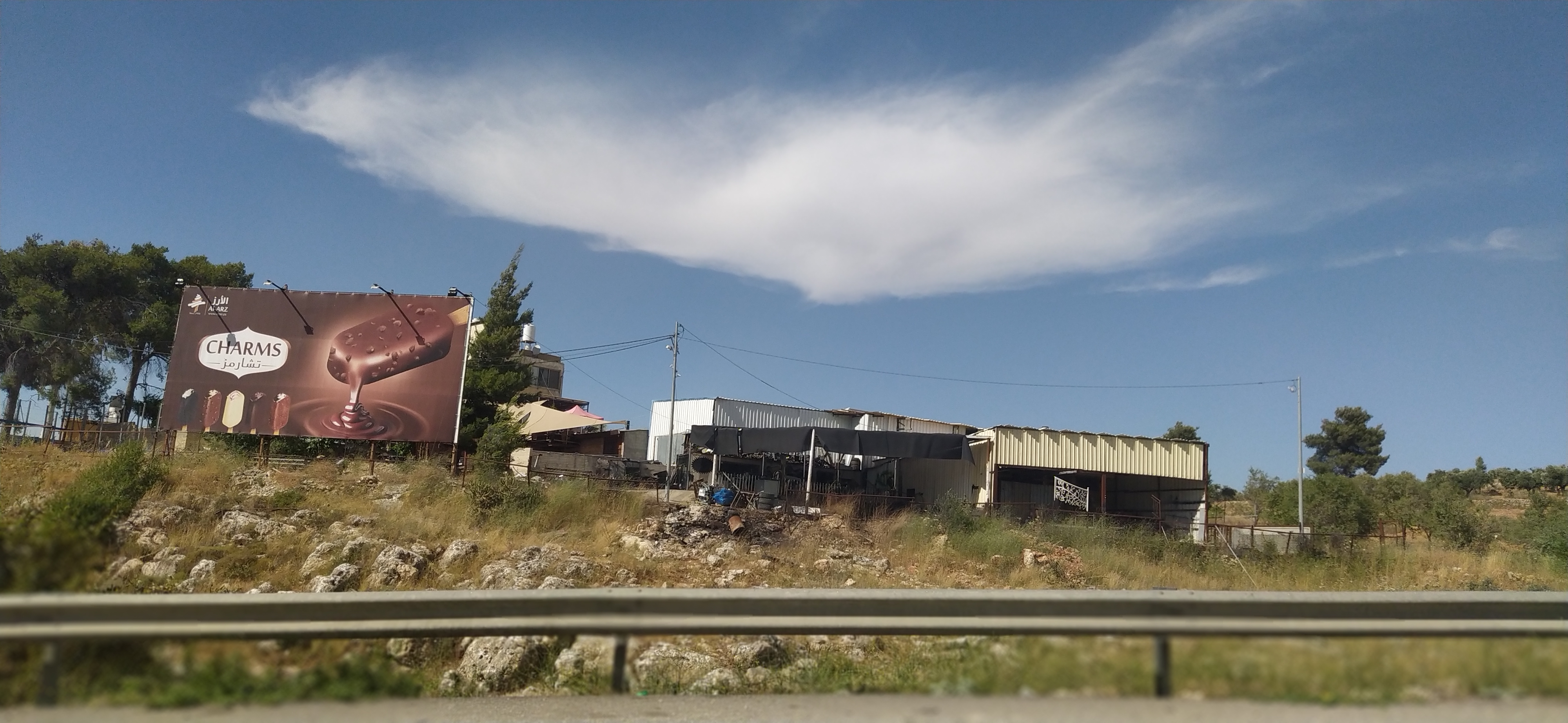
- Za'tara buildings

- Location of Za'tara in Palestine
- Coordinates: 32°07′21″N 35°15′25″E
- Country: Palestine
- Governorate: Nablus
- Elevation: 560 m (1,840 ft)

Population (2017)
  - Total: 63

Za'tara (Arabic: زعترة، نابلس) is a village located in the Nablus Governorate in the northern West Bank, Palestine. It is about 18 km south of Nablus. Since the Six-Day War in 1967, it has been under Israeli occupation. It is located in Beita, Nablus, municipality services.
