= Lions' Den (militant group) =

Palestinian faction in the West Bank

- Logo used by Lions' Den
- Founders: Mohammed al-Azizi †; Abdel Rahman Suboh †; Abdul Hakim Shaheen †; Ibrahim al-Nabulsi †
- Founded: July 2022
- Split from: Nablus Brigade and Fatah (in part)
- Country: Palestine
- Allegiance: Hamas and Palestinian Islamic Jihad (political and financial support, according to Israel and the Palestinian Authority)
- Headquarters: Nablus, occupied West Bank, Palestine
- Active regions: West Bank
- Ideology: Big tent
- Size: ~100 (according to Palestinian security sources in 2022)

The Lions' Den (Arabic: عرين الأسود, romanized: ʿArīn al-ʾUsud) is a Palestinian militant group operating in the Israeli-occupied West Bank.

The group emerged in August 2022, a year of increased violence in the Israeli–Palestinian conflict, and takes its moniker from its co-founder Ibrahim al-Nabulsi, a prominent militant from Nablus, nicknamed "The Lion of Nablus", who was killed in an Israeli raid. It comprises members of other Palestinian militant organizations, traditionally opposed by Fatah, including Hamas and Palestinian Islamic Jihad, and disaffected members of Fatah, mainly young and secular. The group is reportedly based in the Old City of Nablus.

The organization was founded by a 25-year-old Palestinian named Mohammed al-Azizi, more commonly known as "Abu Saleh", and his friend Abdel Rahman Suboh, or "Abu Adam", 28 years old. They were both killed in fighting in July 2022. The group has experienced a rise in popularity among Palestinians in the West Bank, spurred by mounting frustration with the over 50 year old Israeli occupation of the West Bank, the seeming permanence of Israeli settlements and an accompanying increasing Israeli settler violence, along with ineffective governance by the Palestinian Authority.

The group has experienced a rise in popularity among Palestinians in the West Bank, regularly sharing videos of their attacks on TikTok and Telegram. Their TikTok account was suspended in October 2022, leading the group to publish the rest of their videos to their Telegram account, which holds 238,000 subscribers as of 24 February 2023.

== Background ==
2022 was the deadliest year in the West Bank for Palestinians since 2015, mostly focused on Nablus and Jenin. There has been a notable rise in violence by extremist Jewish settlers. Following the killing of an Israeli soldier on 11 October 2022, for which the Lions' Den claimed responsibility, Nablus is under a tight siege which Palestinians protest as collective punishment.

== Funding ==
The group receives undisclosed amounts of funds from Hamas and Palestinian Islamic Jihad according to Israeli and Palestinian officials.

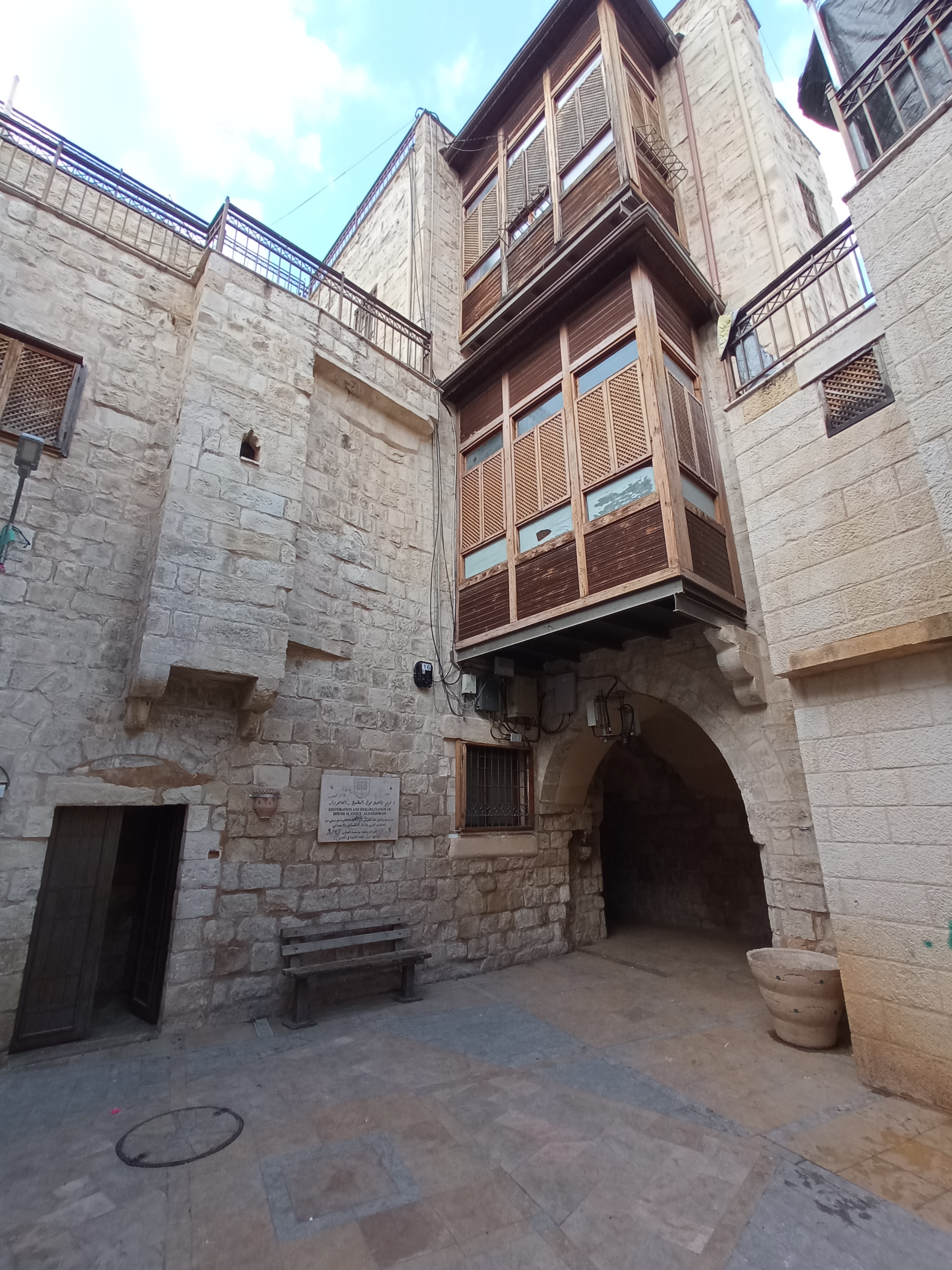
The headquarters, in the Old City of Nablus, of the Lions' Den (militant group)

== History ==
Lions' Den grew out of the related Nablus Brigade. Ibrahim al-Nabulsi was a co-founder of both groups. Lions' Den was first identified by Palestinian media in August 2022, when it claimed responsibility for an attack on IDF soldiers in Rujeib, West Bank. The group then held a rally in Nablus in September, honouring two Palestinian Islamic Jihad members who had been killed in July. The same month, Israeli police said that they had foiled a plan by the group to carry out a large-scale attack in southern Tel Aviv, and arrested a suspect trying to enter the city carrying two pipe bombs and a submachine gun. The Palestinian Authority also made an arrest of an individual associated with the group in Nablus, resulting in clashes between hundreds of militants and security forces, and one civilian being shot and killed by the PA force. In late September, shots were fired at the Israeli settlement of Har Bracha and a nearby military post, and the Lions' Den claimed responsibility. A Lions' Den member was later killed in an IDF ambush.

In October, a taxi and bus were shot at by militants near Elon Moreh in the West Bank, injuring the taxi driver. A demonstration by local Israeli settlers to protest the incident was attacked with gunfire, wounding a soldier. The Lions' Den claimed responsibility for the incidents. Shots were also fired at Israeli troops near Itamar and Beita, but nobody was harmed. An IDF raid on 5 October to find the suspects of the earlier attacks resulted in the arrest a member of the group and one militant being killed. Israeli settlers held a demonstration on 11 October in Jerusalem to protest the recent attacks. A 21-year-old Israeli soldier who had been assigned to defend the group was shot and killed, and the Lions' Den claimed responsibility.

Israeli media reported in mid-October that Prime Minister Yair Lapid, alternate prime minister Naftali Bennett and Defense Minister Benny Gantz along with the heads of Israel's Mossad and Shin Bet, met to discuss the group and the recent escalations in the West Bank. On 18 October, another member of the group was arrested by the IDF. On 23 October, another member of the Lions' Den, was killed by a bomb planted on a motorcycle in Nablus, in the occupied West Bank.

=== Assassinations ===
On 25 October 2022, Israeli soldiers raided an apartment in Nablus allegedly in use by the group as a headquarters. Three Lions' Den militants were killed, including leader and co-founder Wadee al-Houh. Two Palestinian civilians were also killed in the nearby areas. Protests erupted in the town of Nabi Saleh hours after the raid, resulting in a Palestinian man being killed by Israeli soldiers.

In February 2023, Israeli soldiers conducted a military incursion into the Palestinian city of Nablus. The initial targets were Lions' Den members Husam Bassam Isleem (24) and Muhammad Omar “Juneidi” Abu Bakr (23), who were shot and killed. Five other group members were also killed during firefight in the city. Four Palestinian civilians, including three elderly men and a boy, were also killed by the Israeli soldiers.

=== Execution of an alleged traitor ===
Following the assassinations in February 2023, Lions' Den executed one of their members for allegedly sharing information with the Israeli security services that led to the deaths of several leaders of the group. The young man had been bribed and blackmailed by Shin Bet, allegedly using a video of him having sex with a male partner.

=== 2023–present Gaza war ===
Lions' Den has been reported to be largely dormant since the summer of 2023.

However, in April 2024, according to Palestinian media, the group conducted shooting attacks at Israeli forces at a checkpoint near Nablus.

On June 6, 2024, the United States imposed sanctions on Lions' Den, declaring it as a threat to peace and stability in the West Bank. The sanctions include freezing of any assets the group holds under U.S. jurisdiction and barring Americans from dealing with the group.

== See also ==
- Timeline of the Israeli–Palestinian conflict in 2022
- Jenin Brigades
- Israeli incursions in the West Bank during the Gaza war
