= 2023 Jenin incursions =

There were several major Israeli incursions into the Jenin refugee camp in 2023:

- January 2023 Jenin incursion
- June 2023 Jenin incursion
- July 2023 Jenin incursion
- Israeli incursions in the West Bank during the Gaza war (since October 2023)
