= July 2023 Tel Aviv attack =

Vehicle-ramming and stabbing by Hamas in Israel

- Part of the Israeli–Palestinian conflict
- Location: Tel Aviv, Israel
- Date: 4 July 2023
- Target: Israeli civilians
- Attack type: Vehicle-ramming, stabbing
- Deaths: 1 perpetrator, 1 fetus
- Injuries: 9 victims
- Perpetrator: Hamas (claimed member)

On 4 July 2023, a Palestinian resident of the West Bank carried out a vehicle-ramming and stabbing attack in Tel Aviv, Israel. Hamas later claimed that the individual was a member and the attack in response to the July 2023 Jenin incursion.

== Background ==
During 2023, Israel carried out incursions into Jenin, West Bank, in January, June and July.

== Attack ==
On 4 July 2023, a 20-year-old Palestinian man from As-Samu in the West Bank injured nine people in Tel Aviv, Israel. He deliberately drove a pickup truck into pedestrians on Pinchas Rosen Street in the north of the city. He then got out of the vehicle and stabbed one of them in the neck. A motorcyclist shot the attacker dead. Out of the injured, a seriously injured pregnant woman lost her unborn child.

== Reaction ==
Hamas said he was a member of their Islamist Palestinian nationalist militant group. They praised the attack as heroic, saying it was revenge for the July 2023 Jenin incursion, which began the previous day.

== See also ==
- Tel Aviv attack
- Timeline of the Israeli–Palestinian conflict in 2023
