= July 2023 Jenin incursion =

Israeli military operation

- Part of the Israeli–Palestinian conflict
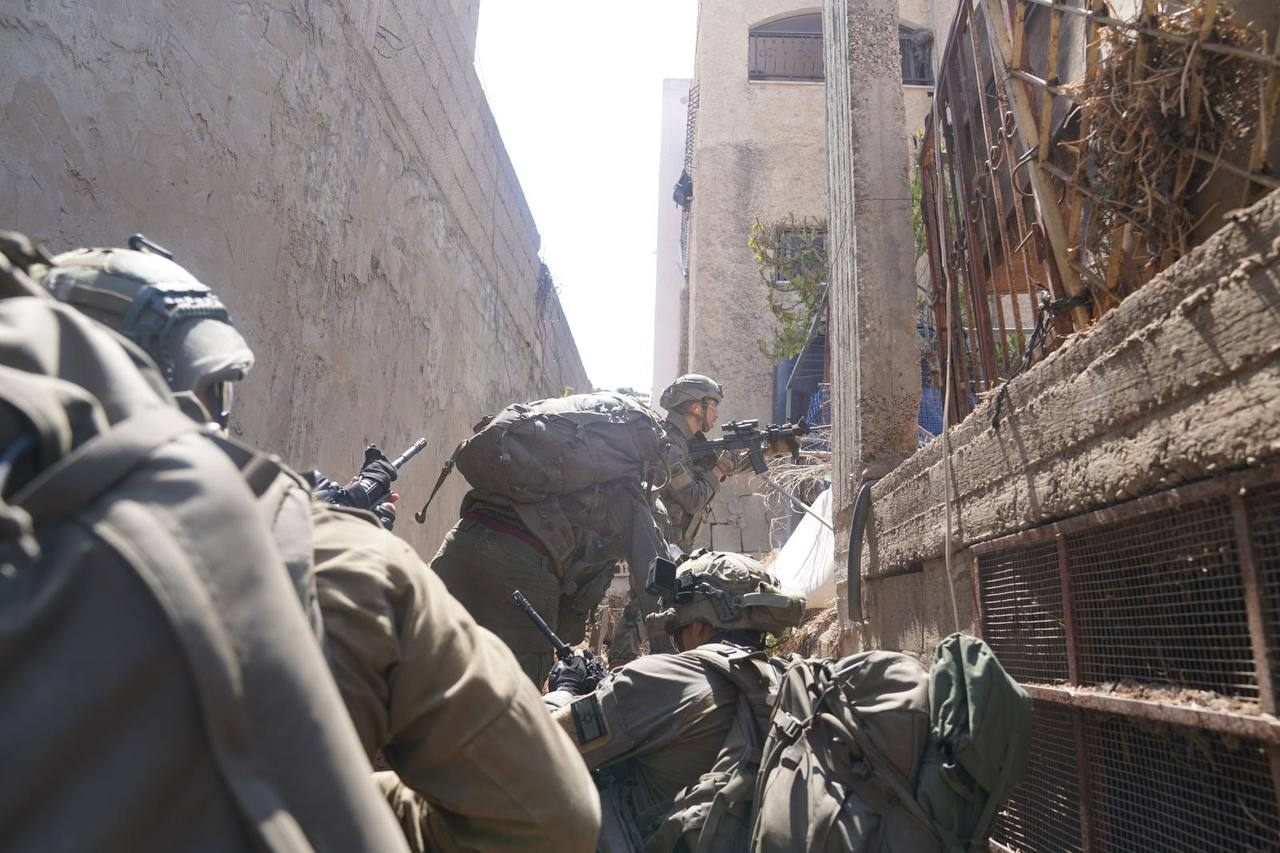
- Israeli soldiers in action during the operation
Date	3–5 July 2023
Location	Jenin, West Bank
Result	Israeli victory: Palestinian militants killed; Israeli forces tactically withdraw with minimal losses

Belligerents
Israel	Palestinian Islamic Jihad; Hamas; Other militants

Commanders and leaders
Herzi Halevi	Unknown

Units involved
IDF	(Palestinian Islamic Jihad) Al Quds Brigades; Al-Qassam Brigades; Jenin Battalion

Strength
1,000 soldiers, per IDF; Several armed drones Air support	Unknown

Casualties and losses
1 killed (by friendly fire)	12–18, including at least 8 PIJ militants and 1 Hamas militant 100 wounded, 20 critically
- Other incursions

On 3 July 2023, the Israeli military conducted a major assault on the Jenin refugee camp in the West Bank. The Israeli government stated that the goal of the operation, named Operation Home and Garden, was to target militants within the camp.

The attack began in the early hours of 3 July and resulted in the deaths of at least 12 Palestinians, including at least 9 militants, and injuries to 100 others. The military emphasized that the operation is "one in a series", limited to the refugee camp area in Jenin. Up to 500 Palestinian families had to leave their homes due to the Israeli assault.

The assault was the largest incursion and deployment of aerial force against militants in the West Bank in 20 years, since fighting during the Second Intifada. Israeli military and political echelons expressed differing views about the scale and intent of the operation.

== Background ==
Since the escalation of Israeli-Palestinian violence in the spring of 2022, the Jenin camp and its neighboring town have remained a focal point of tension. Jenin has historically been a stronghold for armed resistance against Israel and was a significant source of friction during the Second Intifada.

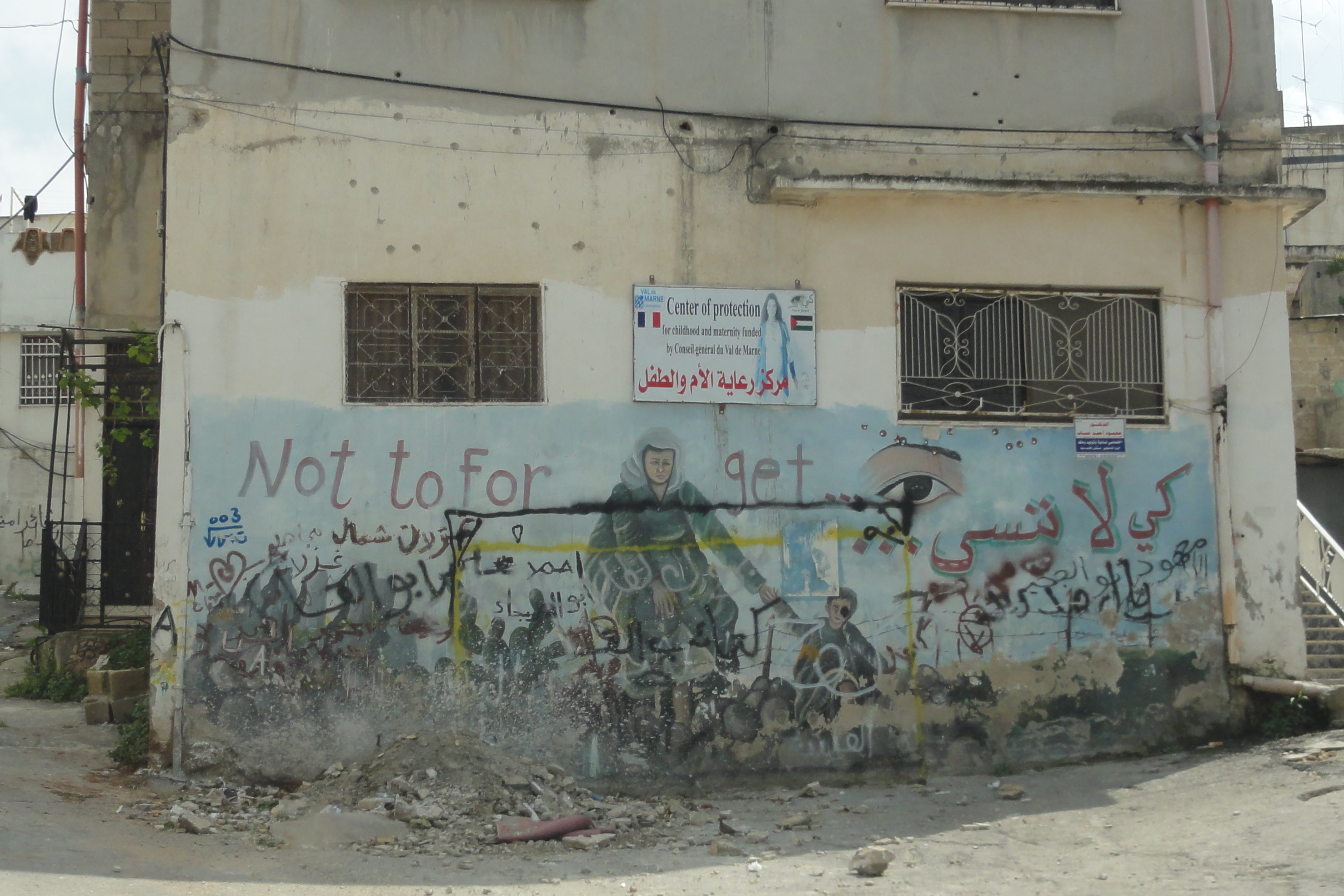
Graffiti in the Jenin camp in 2011, which read "Not to forget"

In 2023, the refugee camp was repeatedly targeted by Israeli forces. The incursion took place amidst increasing violence in the West Bank, including another violent clash in Jenin two weeks prior, a rocket attack originating from the area, the first Israeli drone attack in the West Bank since 2006, and attacks by settlers on Palestinian villages. Furthermore, there was growing domestic pressure to respond to a series of attacks on Israeli settlers, including a shooting in June that resulted in the deaths of four Israelis. Influential members within Prime Minister Benjamin Netanyahu's right-wing government have also advocated for more extensive military retaliation to address the ongoing violence in the region.

== Attack ==
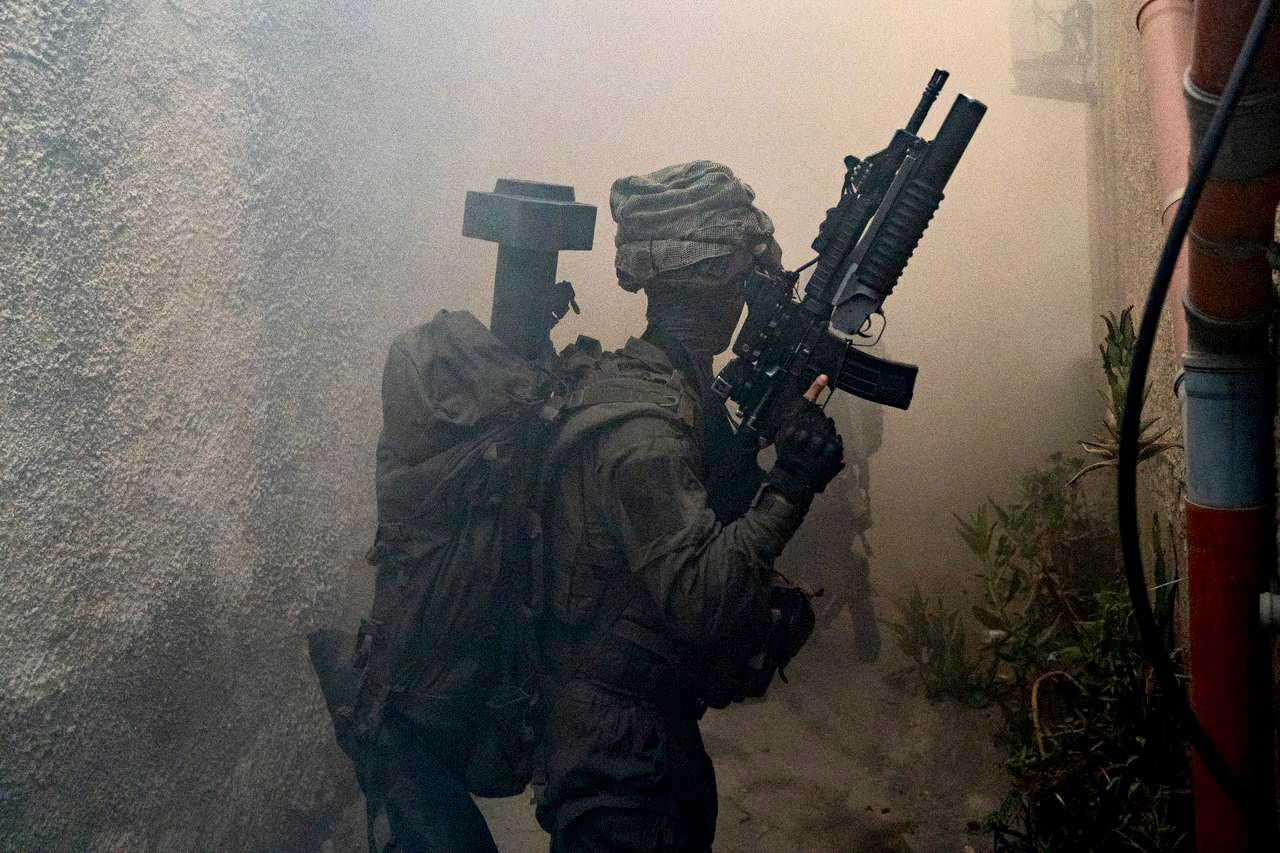
Israeli soldier during the operation

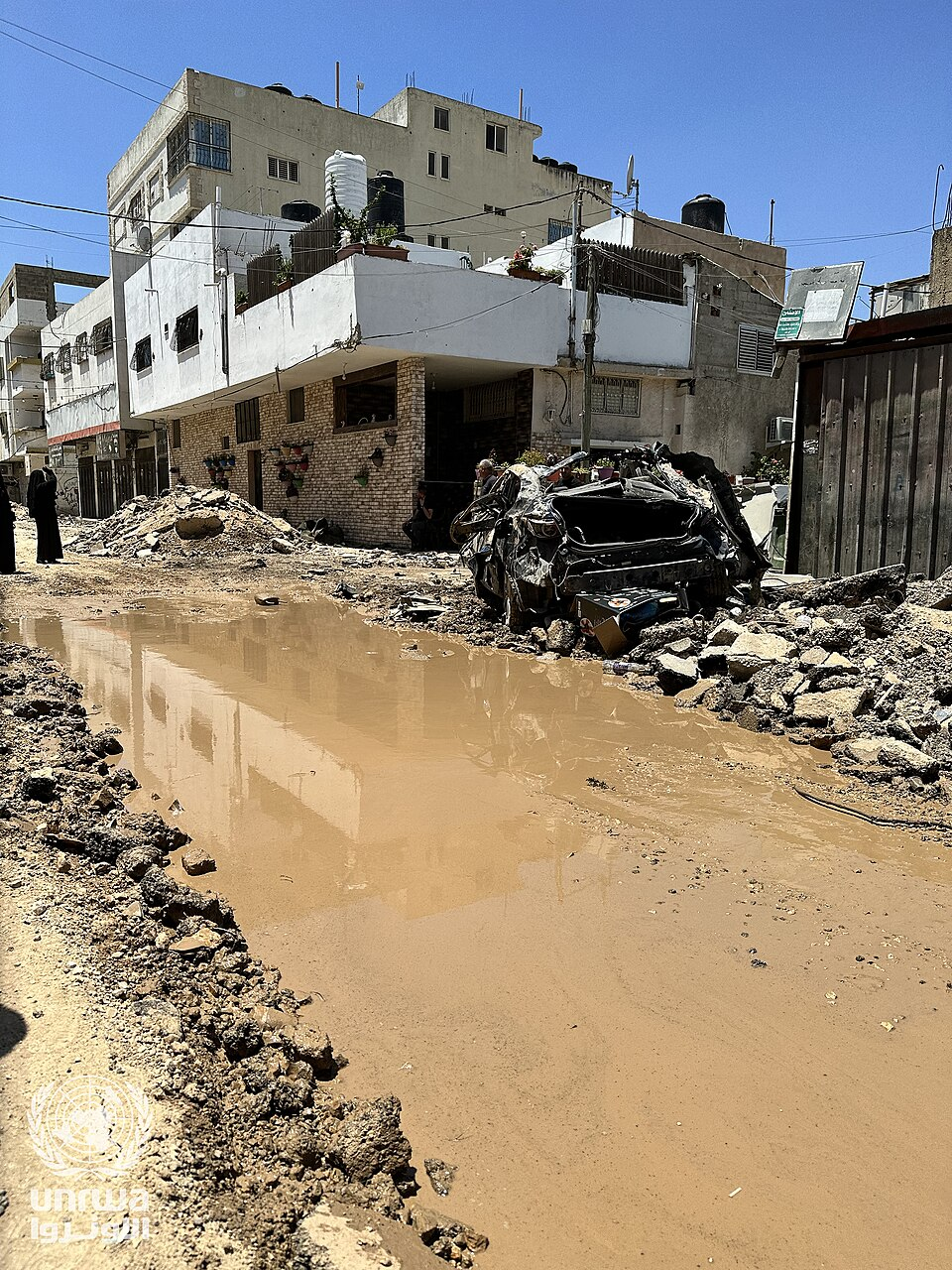
Damage in Jenin caused by the IDF

The attack began with drone strikes on what the IDF called "terrorist infrastructure" shortly after 1 A.M. The airstrikes were followed by the deployment of troops who remained inside the camp until midday. The fighting persisted for approximately 14 hours after the Israeli forces entered the camp. IDF spokesman Richard Hecht disclosed that around 2,000 soldiers, constituting a brigade-size force, participated in the operation.

The military blocked roads, seized control of houses and buildings, and positioned snipers on rooftops. Military bulldozers were utilized to clear paths through narrow streets to facilitate the movement of Israeli forces, resulting in damage to buildings.

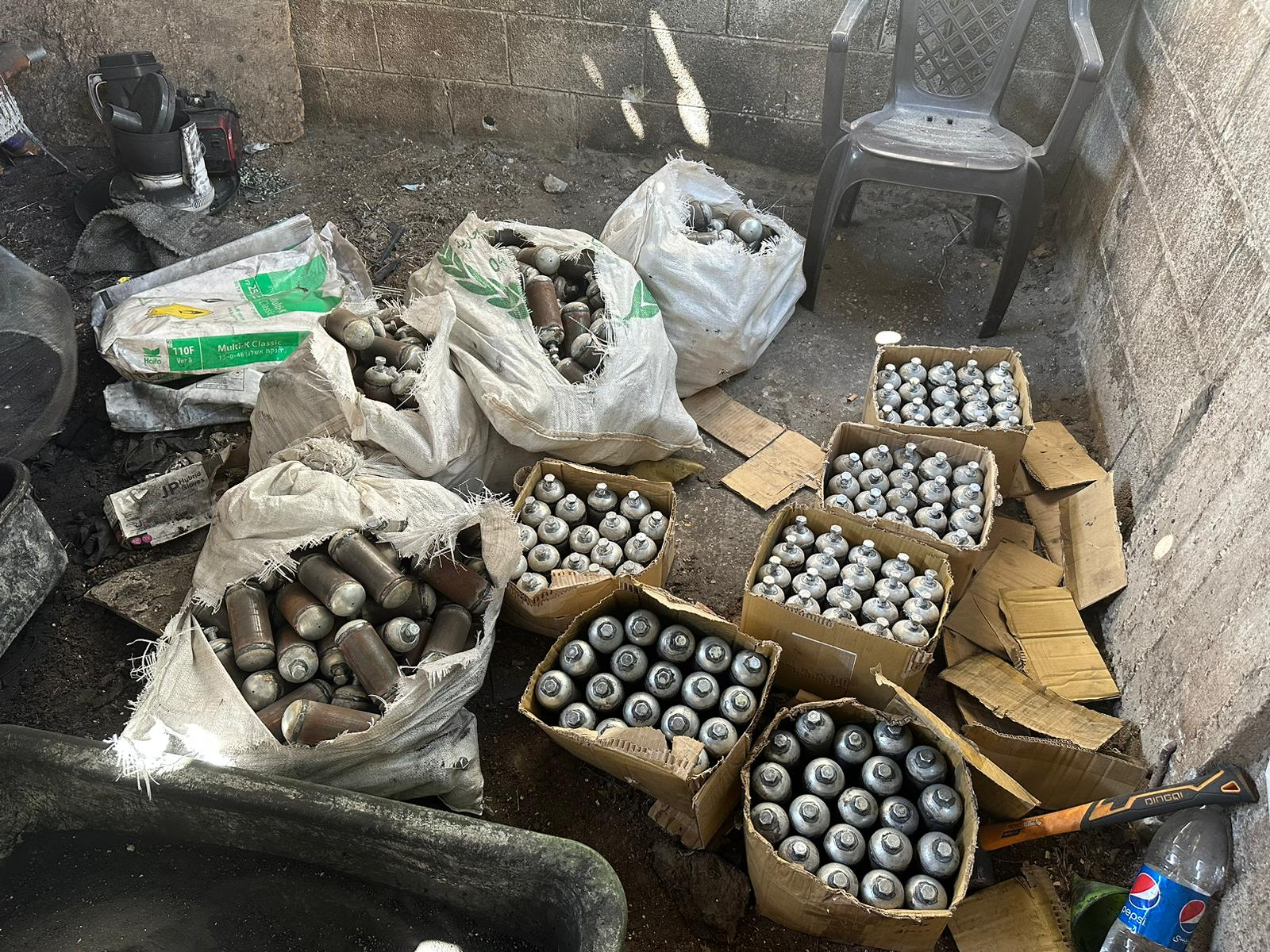
A weapons cache found in Jenin, according to the IDF

According to the Palestinian Health Ministry, at least 10 Palestinians, including three minors, were killed in the incident, with 100 individuals sustaining injuries, leaving 20 in critical condition. The eldest of the victims on Monday was 23 years old. Journalists also reported being targeted by Israeli fire while reporting on events.

Palestinian sources stated that 3,000 people fled or were evacuated from the camp to escape the fighting. The Palestinian Red Crescent stated that it expected the numbers to rise amid ongoing Israeli military activity in the area. UNRWA confirmed that camp residents were leaving.

The Israeli army stated that it discovered three facilities involved in the production of weapons and confiscated caches of weapons and hundreds of explosives. It also reported that the missiles fired during the operation hit a joint operations center used by militants from the Jenin Brigades, as well as a facility responsible for weapons manufacturing and the storage of explosive devices.

== Casualties ==
Among the 12 Palestinian fatalities, Palestinian Islamic Jihad claimed eight as militants. At least one was a Hamas militant.

In addition to the 12 Palestinians killed, 23-year-old Israeli soldier Sergeant-Major David Yitzhak, from the Egoz unit, was also killed during the operation. An IDF investigation revealed that Yitzhak was mistakenly shot by other Israeli commandos, due to misidentification while securing the withdrawal from the camp, in a case of friendly fire. The probe highlighted positioning issues in the IDF's withdrawal and led to various "disciplinary actions" against Oz Brigade officers.

== Reactions ==
=== Palestine ===
Nabil Abu Rudeineh, the spokesperson for the Palestinian presidency, asserted that the Palestinian people would not yield, surrender, or back down "in the face of this brutal aggression."

Inside the Gaza Strip a march of solidarity was organized by local political groups such as the ruling Hamas party and the PFLP in solidarity with Jenin.

The first funeral for the dead took place on 5 July. When senior Palestinian Authority members, including Mahmoud Aloul, an ally of Mahmoud Abbas, arrived to offer their respects, they were heckled and chased off by the mourners.

=== International ===
Jordan, Algeria, Egypt, the United Arab Emirates, and the Organization of Islamic Cooperation (OIC) condemned the violence.

Hezbollah also condemned the attacks, stating that the Palestinians possess "many alternatives and means that will make the enemy regret its acts".

=== United Nations and EU ===
Lynn Hastings, the U.N. humanitarian coordinator in the Palestinian areas, expressed her concern on Twitter about the extensive Israeli military operation, noting that the airstrikes occurred in a densely populated refugee camp.

On July 6, a "clearly angered" U.N. Secretary-General António Guterres, in a rare condemnation of Israel, condemned the assault for excessive use of force and said of Israel "as the occupying power, it has a responsibility to ensure that the civilian population is protected against all acts of violence." The statement followed a statement the previous day by three UN independent human rights experts who said that the actions "amount to egregious violations of international law and standards on the use of force and may constitute a war crime". Israel demanded a retraction, Guterres declined.

European Union representative to the Palestinian territories Sven Kuehn von Burgsdorff led a delegation of UN officials and diplomats from 25 countries to the camp on 8 July, echoed Guterres remarks, called the assault a violation of international law and called for a political resolution to the conflict.

== Aftermath ==
On 4 July, nine people were injured in the city of Tel Aviv following a vehicle-ramming and stabbing attack by a Palestinian man. Hamas claimed the attack was "heroic and revenge for the military operation in Jenin".

On 5 July near Mount Gerizim armed militants opened fire at an Israeli police vehicle, damaging the vehicle and also a local store. The attack reportedly left no Israelis or militants injured. The PFLP's armed wing, the Abu Ali Mustapha Brigades claimed responsibility for the attack. A day later, the two Palestinian gunmen allegedly responsible for the shooting attack were killed by Israeli troops in Nablus during an attempt to arrest them.

On 6 July, an IDF soldier was killed after a Palestinian gunman opened fire at security forces who had stopped to inspect his vehicle near the Israeli settlement of Kedumim. The assailant was killed by Israeli forces after fleeing the scene. The attack was claimed by Hamas, who referred to it as a "heroic operation" in retaliation for the Israeli incursion in Jenin two days prior.

== See also ==
- Outline of the Gaza war
- Timeline of the Israeli–Palestinian conflict in 2023
- January 2023 Jenin incursion
- February 2023 Nablus incursion
- June 2023 Jenin incursion
