= Tel Aviv attack =

Tel Aviv attack may refer to:

- 1948 Tel Aviv bus station bombing
- 1972 Lod Airport massacre, near Tel Aviv
- 1975 Savoy Hotel attack
- 1989 Tel Aviv–Jerusalem bus 405 suicide attack
- 1989 Purim stabbing attack, Tel Aviv
- 1996 Dizengoff Center suicide bombing
- 1997 Café Apropo bombing
- 2002 Allenby Street bus bombing
- 2002 Neve Shaanan Street bombing
- 2002 Sheffield Club bombing, near Tel Aviv
- 2002 Tel Aviv outdoor mall bombing
- 2003 Tel Aviv Central bus station massacre
- 2003 Mike's Place suicide bombing
- 2004 Carmel Market bombing
- 2005 Stage Club bombing
- 2006 1st Rosh Ha'ir restaurant bombing
- 2006 2nd Rosh Ha'ir restaurant bombing
- 2009 Tel Aviv gay centre shooting
- 2011 Tel Aviv nightclub attack
- 2012 Tel Aviv bus bombing
- 2013: 2013 Bat Yam bus bombing, near Tel Aviv
- 2014 Killing of Sergeant Almog Shiloni
- 2015 Tel Aviv synagogue stabbing
- January 2016 Tel Aviv shooting
- March 2016 Tel Aviv stabbings
- June 2016 Tel Aviv shooting
- 2019 Tel Aviv rocket strike
- 2022 Bnei Brak shootings
- 2022 Tel Aviv shooting
- July 2023 Tel Aviv attack
- 2024 Tel Aviv shooting
