= 2023 Neve Yaakov shooting =

Mass murder of Israelis in East Jerusalem

- Part of the Israeli–Palestinian conflict
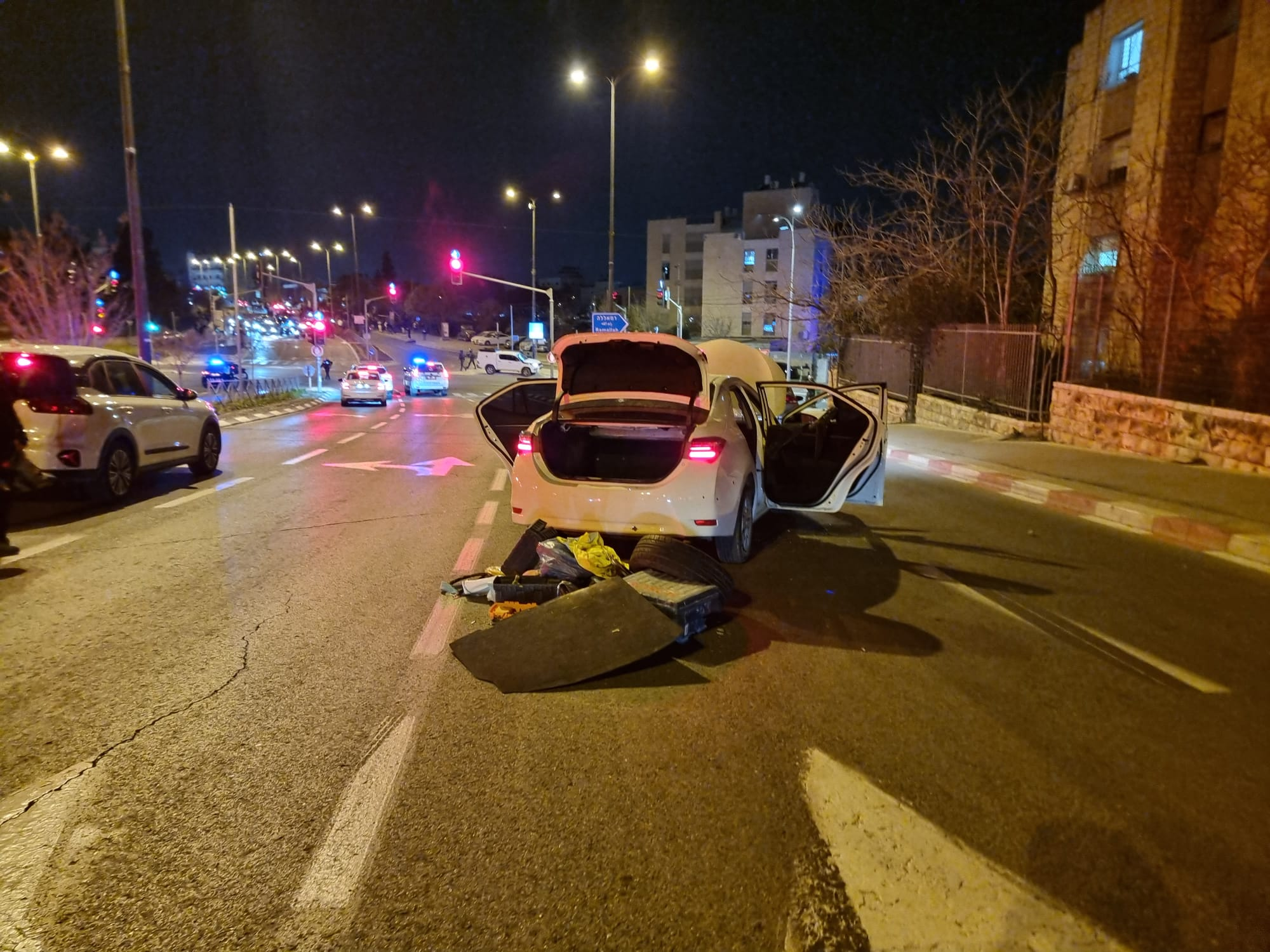
- The car in which the assailant was shot while fleeing
- Location: 31°50′17″N 35°14′19″E; Neve Yaakov, East Jerusalem, West Bank
- Date: 27 January 2023; 8:13 p.m. (UTC+2)
- Attack type: Mass shooting
- Deaths: 7 civilians (+1 attacker)
- Injuries: 3
- Assailant: Khairi Alqam

On 27 January 2023, a Palestinian gunman killed at least seven civilians in the Israeli settlement of Neve Yaakov, in East Jerusalem, the occupied West Bank. The suspect is also reported as having shot at worshippers exiting a synagogue, and, according to the police, was shot and killed after he opened fire on the attending officers. It was Israel's deadliest peacetime Palestinian attack since the Jerusalem yeshiva attack in 2008.

Palestinian militant groups did not claim the suspect as a member, but called the attack a natural retaliation for the raid in Jenin the day prior that killed 10 Palestinians, while the Palestinian Authority blamed the Israeli government for "dangerous escalation".

Many nations and international organizations issued statements condemning the attack while others called for restraint. Palestinian and Israeli sources stated that between 42 and 50 people had been arrested since the attack, mostly family members of the perpetrator.

== Attack ==
According to Haaretz, the attacker first walked 200 metres past the Neve Yaakov synagogue and killed four passersby and a motorcyclist. People who had heard the shots began to emerge from the synagogue and the attacker fired at them and then, on the way back to his car, killed two more people at an intersection.

The gunman fled the scene towards the Palestinian neighborhood of Beit Hanina, where he was confronted by police officers and shot dead after opening fire on them while attempting to flee on foot.

Seven people were killed in the attack, five men and two women. The victims ranged from ages 14 to 68. At least three other people were wounded. One of the women killed was confirmed by Ukrainian president Volodymyr Zelenskyy to have been a Ukrainian citizen.

== Background ==
The shooting took place on International Holocaust Remembrance Day, which some commentators suggested could be connected to the attack. On the other hand, there is just as much to suggest that it was an act of revenge driven by biographical motives.

=== Location ===
Neve Yaakov, the location where the attack took place, is an Israeli settlement in East Jerusalem established in 1972 on land expropriated from three neighboring Palestinian towns; it forms part of a belt of settlements interspersed among the area's Palestinian neighborhoods. Writing in Mondoweiss, Jalal Abukhater argues that Neve Yaakov "in its entirety is built on private and titled lands, whose Palestinian owners were never consulted or compensated before the hostile takeover", in addition to being home of the Israeli Defence Force's Central Command over the West Bank, and the "attack cannot be separated from this context."

=== Perpetrator ===
The attacker was identified as Khairi Alqam, a 21-year-old resident of East Jerusalem. An eighteen-year-old relative of his had been killed two days before the attack by Israeli authorities after he reportedly threatened them with a gun which turned out to be a toy.

Alqam's grandfather, whom he was named after, was killed in the 1997–99 Jerusalem stabbings alongside three other Palestinians in 1998.

Musa Alqam, the father of the attacker, said he had no knowledge of his son having planned for such an attack or if he was motivated by revenge. He told Arab media he was proud of his son, and said that "Today is his wedding. I married him today. God will help me and make him better tomorrow."

== Israeli response ==
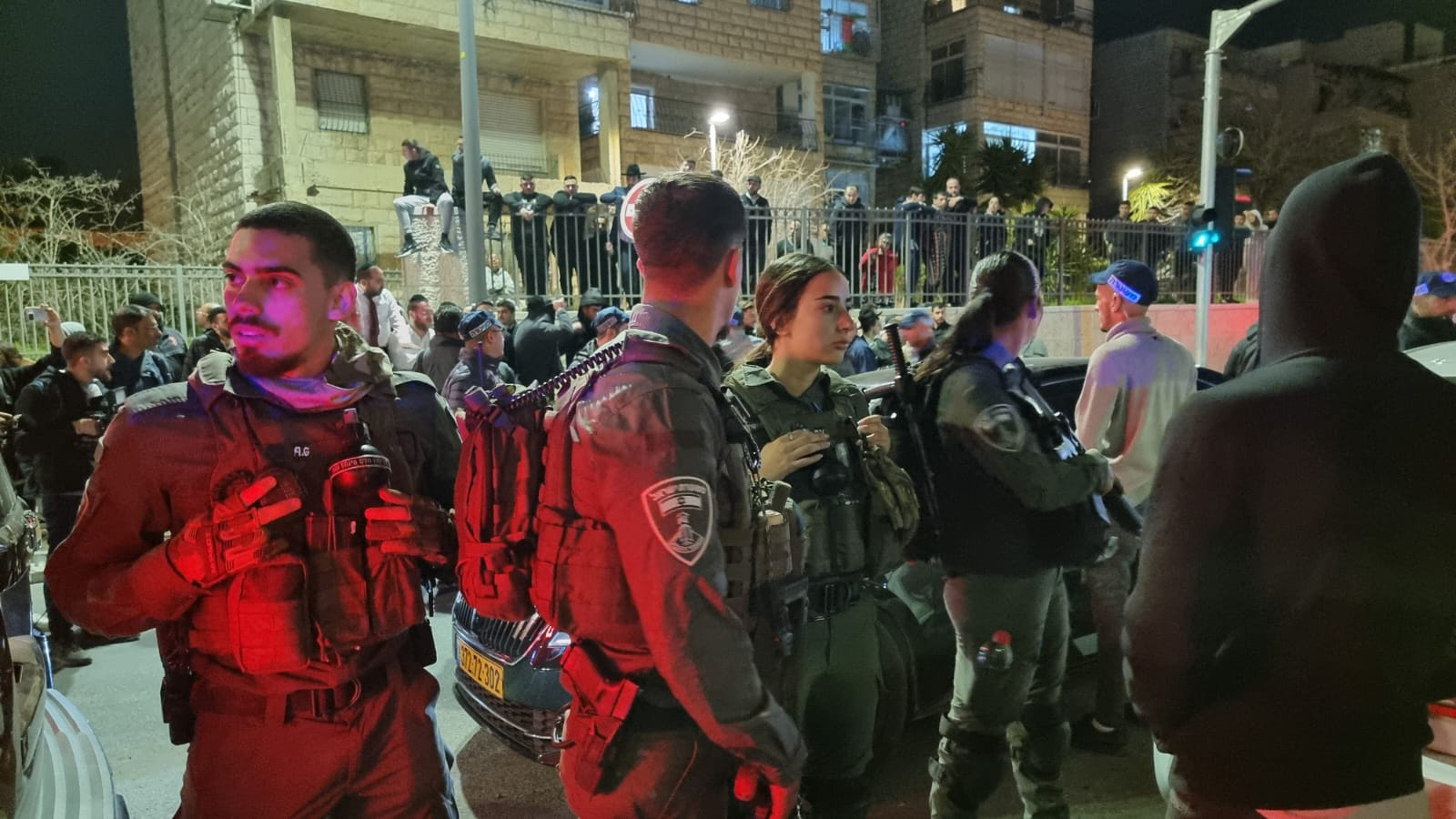
Israeli Police at the scene

Palestinian and Israeli sources stated that between 42 and 50 people have been arrested since the attack, mostly members of the family of the perpetrator. Additionally, Israel is planning on demolishing the perpetrator's house. On 28 January, his home was evacuated and sealed in preparation for demolition.

Following the attack, the office of Benjamin Netanyahu, Prime Minister of Israel, reported that the Cabinet was pushing to strip the residency and citizenship rights of the families of the perpetrator of this attack and others, and also possibly forcibly deport them from the country to the occupied West Bank. The office also said social security benefits would be cancelled for the families of attackers.

Human rights groups pointed out that such measures are collective punishment. The Palestinian Foreign Ministry called the measures a "grave violations of international law, the Geneva Conventions, a collective punishment, and an extension of the Israeli policies aimed at affecting the Palestinian presence in Jerusalem."

Netanyahu himself pledged a "strong, swift and precise" response, and also announced plans to make it easier for Israelis to obtain firearms.

== Palestinian response ==
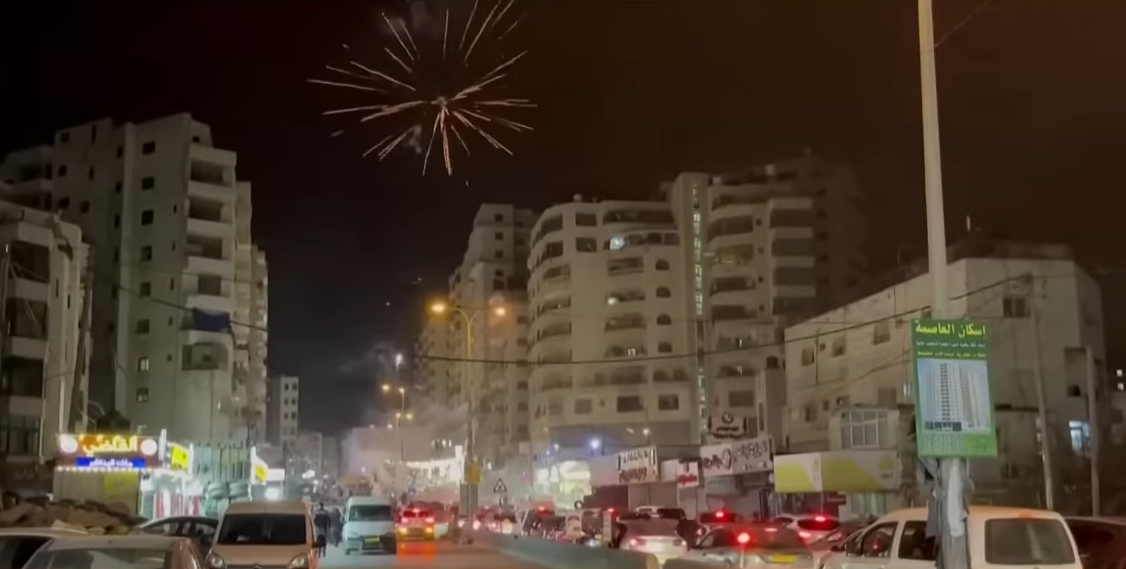
Fireworks were lit in Gaza and the West Bank by some Palestinians in celebration of the attack.

Mahmoud Abbas, President of the Palestinian National Authority, published a statement saying that "the government of Israel is fully responsible for this dangerous escalation."

Palestinian militant groups called the attack a retaliation for the Jenin raid. Hamas spokesman Hazem Qassem referred to the attack as "jihadist and resistance action in the city of Jerusalem" and stated that the battle against the occupation "continues and continues". PIJ spokesman Tariq Ezz El-Din praised what he referred to as a "suicide operation" in response to the "Jenin massacre" the day prior.

Dozens of Palestinians congregated in impromptu gatherings across the Gaza Strip to celebrate the attack. Similar celebrations, including fireworks, sweets, gunfire and car honking, were reported in the West Bank cities of Ramallah, Nablus, Jenin, Hebron, and the East Jerusalem locality of Beit Hanina.

== International reactions ==
Many nations and international organizations issued statements of condemnation following the shooting attack. According to two UN diplomats, it was also unanimously condemned by the 15 members of the UN Security Council in a closed session.

=== By country ===
- France – The French government issued a statement that "France condemns in the strongest terms the appalling terrorist attack that targeted a synagogue in Jerusalem, killing at least seven people and injuring many more [...] This attack against civilians, at the time of prayer, and on the day of the international commemoration of the victims of the Holocaust is particularly despicable. France stands alongside the victims of this attack, as well as their families. In a context of growing tensions, we call on all parties to avoid actions that could fuel the spiral of violence".
- Germany – Olaf Scholz, German Chancellor said "There have been deaths and people wounded in the heart of Israel", and added he was "deeply shocked" by the "terrible" attacks. "My thoughts are with the victims and their families. Germany stands by the side of Israel".
- India – Arindam Bagchi, Official Spokesperson of the Ministry of External Affairs, stated: "We strongly condemn last night's terror attack in Jerusalem. We extend heartfelt condolences to the families of those who lost their lives and wish the injured a speedy recovery".
- Jordan – Jordanian Foreign Ministry condemned the deadly shooting attack, and called on the parties to "stop all unilateral steps and provocations that encourage an escalation."
- Saudi Arabia – In an unusual move, the Ministry of Foreign Affairs warned that "the situation between Palestinians and Israelis will slide into further serious escalation," and added that "the Kingdom condemns all targeting of civilians."
- Turkey – Turkey's Ministry of Foreign Affairs release a statement saying: “We strongly condemn the terror attack at a synagogue in Jerusalem where many people lost their lives. We offer our condolences to the families of the victims, the Israeli government and people. We wish a speedy recovery to the wounded".
- United Arab Emirates – UAE Foreign Affairs Ministry issued a statement expressing "its strong condemnation of the criminal act and its permanent rejection of all forms of violence and terrorism aimed at undermining security and stability in contravention of human values and principles."
- United Kingdom – James Cleverly, UK Foreign Secretary said: “To attack worshippers at a synagogue on Holocaust Memorial Day, and during Shabbat, is horrific. We stand with our Israeli friends.” UK ambassador in Israel Neil Wigan wrote: “I am appalled by reports of the terrible attack in Neve Yaakov tonight. Attacking worshippers at a synagogue on Erev Shabat is a particularly horrific act of terrorism. The UK stands with Israel".
- United States – Antony Blinken, US Secretary of State said: "Our thoughts are with the Israeli people following the terrorist attack in Jerusalem. It is particularly tragic on International Holocaust Remembrance Day. We condemn this attack and express our condolences to the victims' families. May their memory be a blessing".
- The attack was also condemned and condolences were extended by foreign ministers from Poland, Sweden, Serbia, Bosnia and Herzegovina, North Macedonia, Slovenia, the Czech Republic, Italy, and Japan.

=== Other entities ===
- European Union – Josep Borrell, High Representative of the EU stated that "The European Union fully recognizes Israel's legitimate security concerns, as evidenced by the latest terrorist attacks, but it has to be stressed that lethal force must only be used as a last resort when it is strictly unavoidable in order to protect life". EU ambassador to Israel, Dimiter Tzantchev, condemned the shootings. He described them as "senseless violence," and added, "Terror is never the answer."
- United Nations – António Guterres, Secretary-General of the United Nations, stated that "It is particularly abhorrent that the attack occurred at a place of worship, and on the very day we commemorated International Holocaust Remembrance Day. There is never any excuse for acts of terrorism. They must be clearly condemned and rejected by all".

== See also ==
- Timeline of the Israeli–Palestinian conflict in 2023
- 2014 Jerusalem synagogue attack
- List of synagogue shootings
- January 2023 Jenin incursion
