= June 2023 Jenin incursion =

2023 Israeli raid on the Jenin refugee camp

- Part of the Israeli–Palestinian conflict
- Date: 19 June 2023
- Location: Jenin Camp, West Bank

Parties
Israel	Palestinian Islamic Jihad Hamas Other militants

Units involved
Yamas; Israel Defense Forces	(Palestinian Islamic Jihad) Al Quds Brigades; Al-Qassam Brigades; Jenin Battalion

Casualties and losses
8 Israeli soldiers wounded Several vehicles damaged	3 killed 2 arrested
- 4 Palestinian civilians killed, including 2 children 90+ wounded

On 19 June 2023, Israeli soldiers and border police officers entered the Jenin refugee camp to arrest two wanted suspects. This resulted in clashes between Palestinian gunmen from the Jenin Brigades and Israeli soldiers. The clash had led to seven Palestinian deaths and upwards of 90 Palestinians wounded; 8 wounded Israeli soldiers. The incursion led to reprisals on both Israeli and Palestinian populations in the occupied West Bank.

== Raid ==
During the early morning of 19 June 2023, Israeli soldiers and border police officers entered into the Jenin refugee camp to arrest two wanted suspects. Clashes between Palestinian gunmen from the Jenin Brigades and Israeli soldiers broke out. Six Palestinians were killed ouright, and a seventh victim died in hospital. Three of the dead are known to have been militants. At least 90 Palestinians were wounded, among whom 22 are in critical condition. As the Israeli soldiers and border police officers were leaving the city, a roadside bomb was detonated under an Israeli armored vehicle, leaving 8 soldiers wounded, all of whom were successfully evacuated by helicopter. The level and strength of the improvised explosive device (IED) used by the Palestinian militants surprised the Israeli army, as it shows rapid improvement compared to previous poorly performing IEDs.

Israel used helicopters in the incursion, the first time they had been deployed against Palestinian villages for two decades. Israeli snipers reportedly shot at several Palestinian journalists, wearing press jackets, who were attempting to cover the unfolding incursion. One such journalist, Hazem Nasser working for as a cameraman for Al-Ghad TV, was shot and wounded. The Palestinian Red Crescent stated that Israeli fire had targeted four Palestinian ambulances. According to Haaretz, a 15 year old girl, Sadeel Turkman, was shot while inside her home.

Several major Palestinian organisations such as Hamas and the PFLP praised the militants of Jenin. The roadside bomb was claimed by Palestinian Islamic Jihad.

== Aftermath ==
In response to the incursion, 2 Palestinian militants, coming from Urif shot dead 4 Israelis near the Israeli settlement of Eli on 20 June 2023. One of the assailants was shot dead on the scene by an armed settler, the other was later killed by Israeli forces in Tubas.

In response to the Eli shooting, on 21 June 2023, hundreds of Israeli settlers, armed and masked, attacked the Palestinian village of Turmus Ayya in the occupied West Bank, setting at least 50 vehicles and 15 houses on fire. One Palestinian died and 12 others were wounded. The village mayor remarked that "the Israeli army [was] not doing anything to stop" the violence. The following day they attacked the village of Al-Lubban ash-Sharqiya destroying vehicles, damaging 10 homes, vandalizing two shops, a gas station a wheat warehouse, and electricity poles.

== Fatalities ==
Palestinian civilian casualties:

- Ahmed Yousef Saqr (15)
- Khaled Azzam ‘Asa’sa (21)
- Amjad Aref al-Jaas (48)
- Sadeel Turkman (15)

Islamic Jihad casualties:

- Qassam Faisal Abu Sirriya (29)
- Qais Majdi Jabarin (21)
- Ahmed Khaled Daraghmeh (19)

== See also ==
- Timeline of the Israeli–Palestinian conflict in 2023
