= Jenin refugee camp =

Palestinian town in the West Bank founded as a refugee camp

Jenin Camp Arabic: مخيّم جنين Hebrew: מחנה הפליטים ג'נין
- Palestinian refugee camp
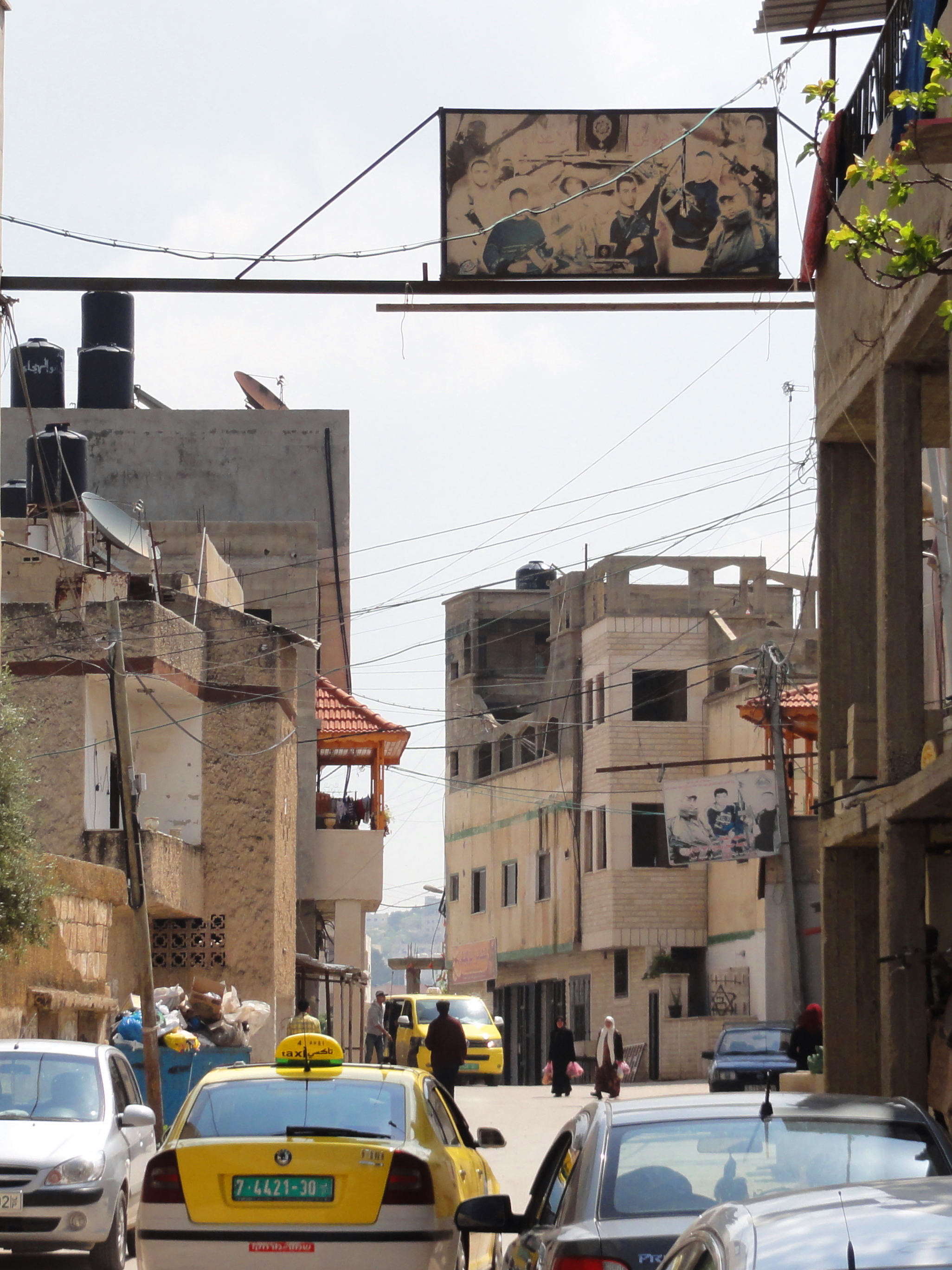
- View from the Jenin refugee camp in 2011
- Nicknames: The Martyr's Capital (by Palestinians); The Hornets' Nest (by Israelis)
- Location of Jenin Camp within Palestine
- Coordinates: 32°27′41″N 35°17′11″E
- Country: State of Palestine
- Control: Israel
- Governorate: Jenin Governorate

Area
  - Total: 0.42 km^{2} (0.16 sq mi)

Population
  - Total: 11,674 (PCBS estimate); 13,000–15,000 (UNRWA estimate); More than 22,000 (Al Jazeera report)

The Jenin refugee camp (Arabic: مخيم جنين للاجئين), also known as the Jenin camp (Arabic: مخيم جنين), is a town originally founded in 1953 as a Palestinian refugee camp located within the city of Jenin in the northern West Bank. It was established in 1953 to house Palestinians who fled or were expelled from their homes by Israeli forces during and in the aftermath of the 1948 Palestine War. The town has since become a stronghold of Palestinian militants and has become known as "The Martyr's Capital" by Palestinians, and "The Hornets' Nest" by Israelis. It is assumed that much of its population is descended from those 1948 refugees. The town is currently under full Israeli military control as part of Israel's "Operation Iron Wall".

The town was the location of several incidents relating to the Israeli–Palestinian conflict, most notably the 2002 Battle of Jenin between Israel and Palestinian militants, the 2022 killing of Al Jazeera journalist Shireen Abu Akleh, and the 2025 Israeli operations in the West Bank. Jenin remains the site of frequent clashes between Israeli forces and Palestinians.

The town has a high population density, estimated at 33,000/km^{2} (85,000/sq mi) by the UNRWA. The town's residents face difficult living conditions, which are caused in part by Israeli restrictions. The town has a high unemployment rate compared to the rest of the West Bank, and many residents live in substandard shelters, with poor sewage networks and common shortages in water and electricity.

== History ==
=== Establishment and Israeli occupation ===
The Jenin refugee camp was formally established in 1953 after a snowstorm had destroyed a previous refugee camp in the region. The camp was established over 372 dunams of land that was leased to the United Nations Relief and Works Agency for Palestine Refugees in the Near East (UNRWA) for an extended period of time, and was later expanded to 473 dunams (0.42 km^{2}).

The camp is located in the city of Jenin. To its north is the Jezreel Valley or Marj Ibn Amir (Arabic: مرج ابن عامر), and to its east is Jordan Valley. The camp and the entirety of the West Bank was under Jordanian control at the time of its establishment, following the Jordanian annexation of the West Bank that took place in 1950.

Following the defeat of the Arab Armies in the Six-Day War of 1967, the West Bank, including the Jenin camp, came under Israeli occupation. Following the Israeli invasion of southern Lebanon in 1982, the Palestine Liberation Organization (PLO) was forced out of the country, settling in Tunisia. However, many PLO militants chose to return to the occupied Palestinian territories, leading to the emergence of a number of militant groups, a number of which were centered in the vicinity of Jenin. These groups included the 'Black Panthers' of Fatah and the 'Red Eagles' of the Popular Front for the Liberation of Palestine (PFLP).

The residents of the Jenin camp participated in the First Intifada, a major Palestinian uprising against Israel that took place in the late 1980s and early 1990s. During that intifada, the camp was the target of several Israeli raids conducted in search of militants. The Oslo Accords, signed at the end of the First Intifada, transferred the control and administration of the camp to the then-newly established Palestinian National Authority (PA).

=== Second Intifada and Battle of Jenin ===
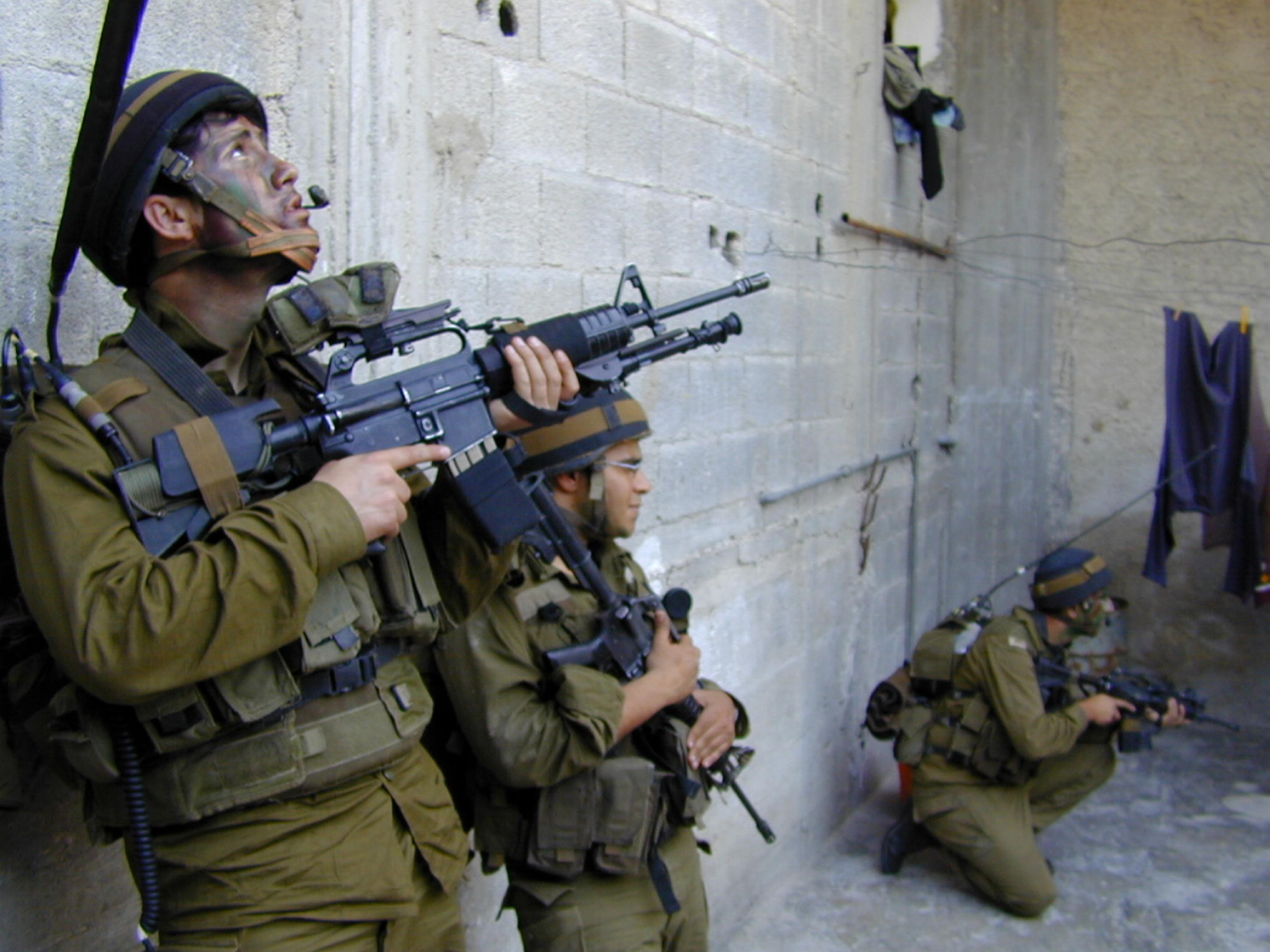
Israeli forces in the Jenin Camp during the Battle of Jenin; 2002

The Jenin camp was heavily involved the Second Intifada, another major Palestinian uprising against Israel that took place in the early 2000s. In April 2002, after a string of Palestinian suicide attacks, Israeli forces entered the camp as part of Operation Defensive Shield, commencing the Battle of Jenin. Israel stated that the camp was a hotbed of Palestinian militancy, and prevented relief workers and reporters from entering the camp, saying that the booby traps set up by the Palestinians were a serious concern. Palestinians later acknowledged that explosives were placed throughout the camp.

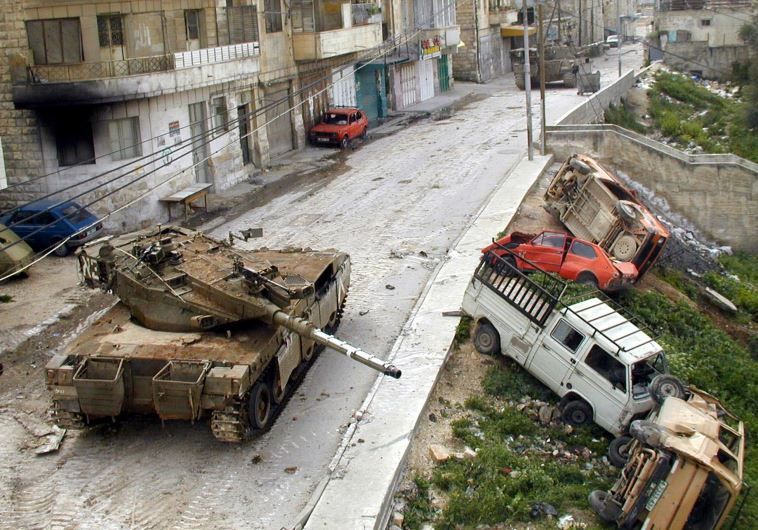
Israeli tanks in the streets of the camp April 2002.

The battle lasted for ten days between 1 April and 11 April, and Israel began withdrawing its troops on 18 April. Over the course of the battle, over 400 homes were destroyed, and hundreds more were severely damaged. A UN envoy likened the camp to an earthquake zone, as did a reporter for the Associated Press who later visited the camp. The BBC reported that ten percent of the camp was "virtually rubbed out by a dozen armored Israeli bulldozers".

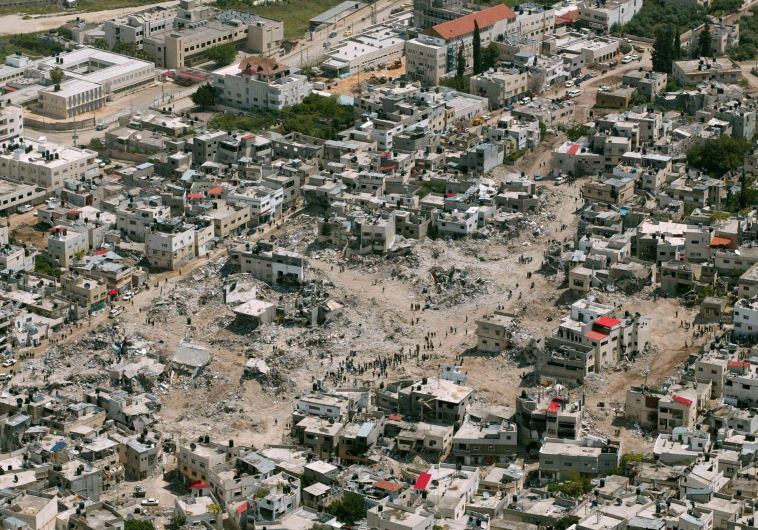
Aerial view of camp, two days after the Israeli attack in April 2002

A report by the United Nations stated that 52 Palestinians and 23 Israeli soldiers were killed in the battle, although the Palestinians claim that the Israeli military killed 500 people during the battle. 4,000 people, a quarter of the camp's pre-battle population, were left homeless because of the destruction. After the battle, the Israeli housing minister offered to rebuild the camp at a nearby location with enlarged roads. However, the camp's residents rejected the proposal, which they saw as an attempt to erase the political symbolism of Palestinian refugee camps, whose existence they see as a living testament to the Nakba. By 2005, the UNRWA had completed the reconstruction of the camp, in an operation that was described as "the largest humanitarian intervention during the Second Intifada". However, this rebuild has been criticized by the camp's residents, who said that the new network of roads exposed them to greater violence and insecurity as it made it easier for Israeli jeeps and tanks to enter the camp.

=== Subsequent violence ===
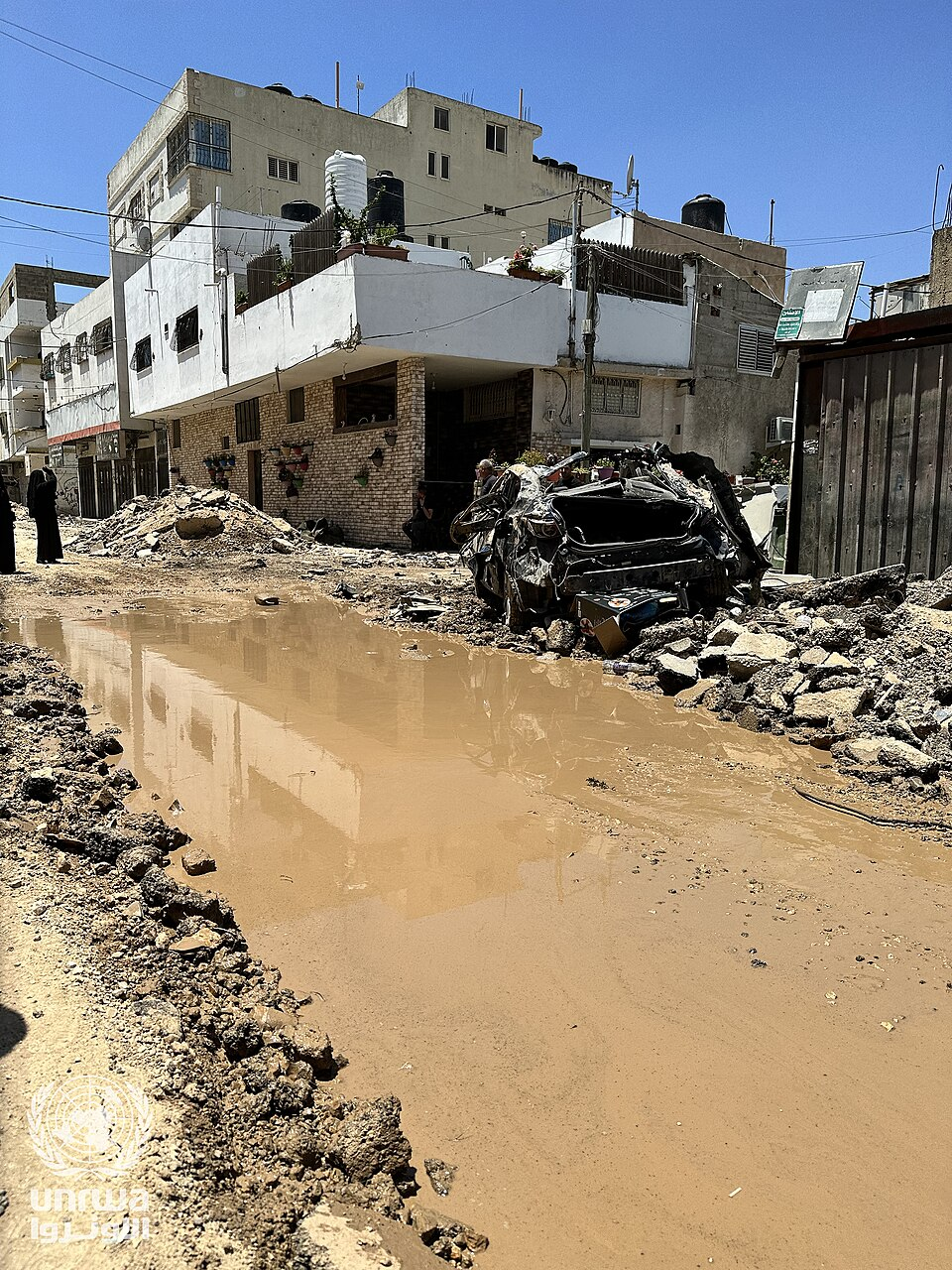
Israeli Armed forces conducted a large scale operation in Jenin camp, tearing up roads, sewages pipes and water network and damaging individual property, July 2023

The Jenin camp is located in Area A of the West Bank, which is under de jure civil and security control by the Palestinian National Authority. However, Israeli forces frequently carry out incursions into the camp with the declared objective of conducting counter-terrorism operations. However, Palestinians say that the Israeli forces target not only militants but also noncombatant civilians, with a paramedic telling CNN that he did not feel safe "even in uniform". These near-daily Israeli raids mostly occur during the night, and lead to clashes with militants.

In September 2021, Ayham Kamamji and Monadel Nafe'at, the final two prisoners at large after the Gilboa Prison break, were rearrested in the Jenin camp, along with two residents who allegedly helped the escapees. The captures took place during a raid by Israeli forces. In May 2022, Al Jazeera journalist Shireen Abu Akleh was killed in the Jenin camp while trying to cover an Israeli raid. Al Jazeera has accused the Israeli forces of deliberately shooting her, although an IDF report has said that the shooting was accidental. The CNN have published evidence which suggests that Abu Akleh was "shot dead in a targeted attack by Israeli forces".

The year 2023 saw an increase in the number and size of Israeli incursions to the camp. In January, the Israeli military raided Jenin city and the refugee camp, killing ten Palestinians, including three civilians. At least one ambulance was hit with live ammunition. The Israeli raid was described as the "deadliest in two decades." In July, Israel launched a largescale incursion involving drones, Apache Helicopters and ground troops targeting militants. This attack was even deadlier, with at least twelve Palestinians killed, eighty injured and fifty arrested. This attack left more than 3500 people internally displaced and 23,600 people without access to water for several weeks, with an estimated $5.2 million of humanitarian aid required to fix the damage. During the Gaza war that began in October, Israeli forces launched multiple ground incursions into the camp.

On January 6, 2024, the Israeli army killed seven Palestinians in an airstrike.

In late August 2024 the Israeli military began an operation in Jenin resulting in significant displacement of the civilian population, as well as both Palestinian and Israeli casualties.

In December 2024, the Palestinian Authority launched its largest operation in three decades, 'Protect the Homeland,' aimed at regaining control of the Jenin refugee camp. The operation saw Palestinian security forces clash with local Islamist militants as part of an effort to dismantle insurgency and curb instability.

== Palestinian militancy ==
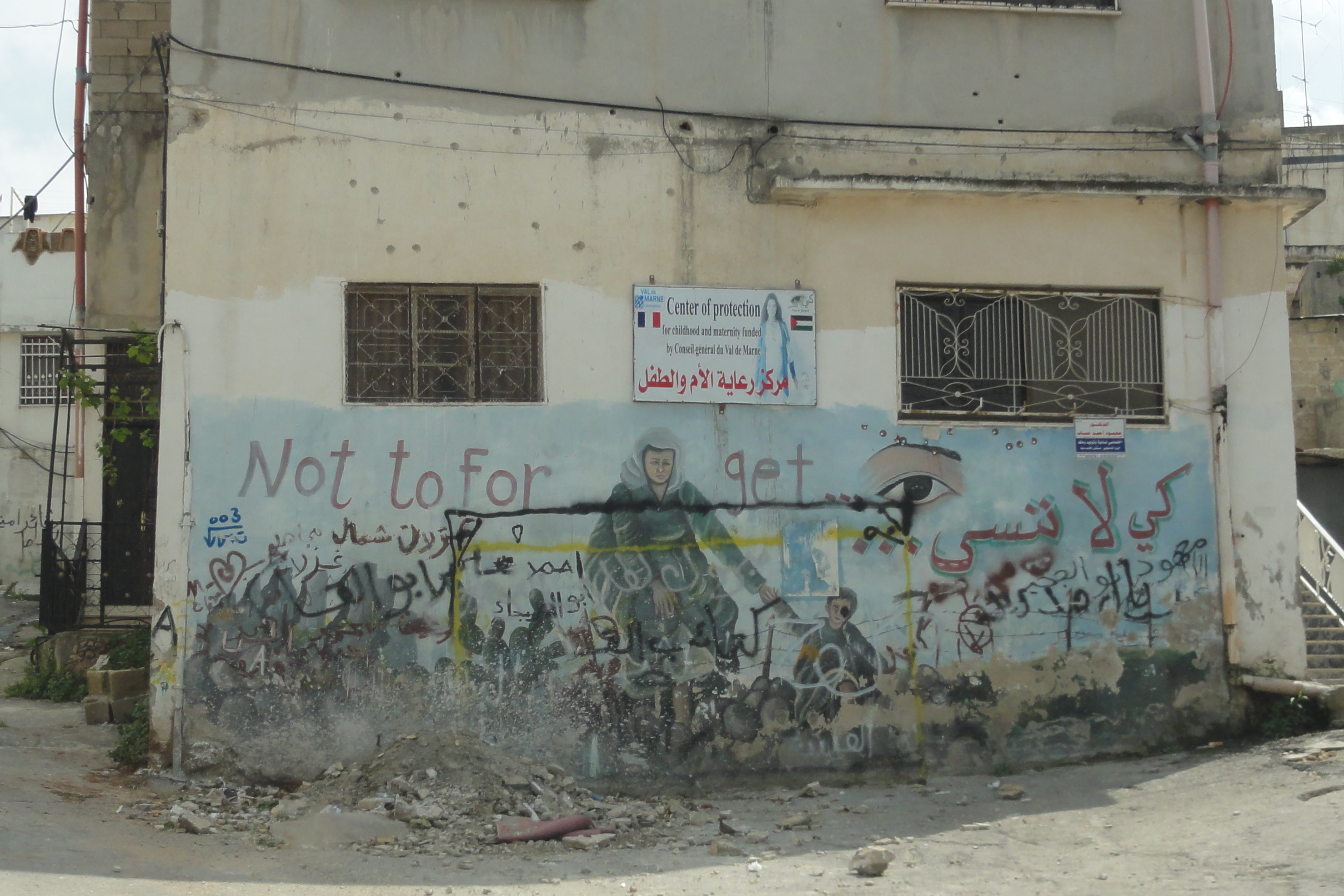
Graffiti in the Jenin Camp in 2011: "Not to forget.."

The Jenin camp has become a center of Palestinian militancy. The al-Quds Brigades of the Palestinian Islamic Jihad (PIJ) and the al-Aqsa Martyrs' Brigades of Fatah are the two most prominent armed groups in the camp, while the Izz ad-Din al-Qassam Brigades of Hamas have recently begun to maintain a more viable presence. These armed groups act as the sole form of resistance and protection for the population from the Israeli army, which regularly comes in and conducts raids, killing civilians, and taking many prisoners.

Armed militants enjoy high levels of support amongst the residents of the camp, who condemn the Palestinian Authority as "collaborators with the occupation". The camp is sometimes referred to by Palestinians as "The Martyr's Capital" and by the Israeli military as "The Hornets' Nest.". In January 2023, thirty five Palestinians were killed in the West Bank in the context of the Israeli-Palestinian conflict, twenty of whom were from the Jenin camp.

In contrast, the Palestinian Authority's control over the camp has been relatively weak due to its location far away from Ramallah, the de facto capital of the PA. In fact, PA forces seldom enter the camp. Israel has blamed the PA for its "incompetence," which has led to the "deterioration of security conditions". However, the PA has rejected these claims, criticizing Israel for "deliberately acting to weaken it", and saying that Israeli actions are to blame for Palestinian violence.

The Jenin Battalion, also known as the Jenin Brigades (Arabic: كتيبة جنين), is a Palestinian armed group that has recently appeared in the Jenin camp. Initially founded by the PIJ in 2021 to serve as a local branch for the al-Quds Brigades, it has developed into an affiliation of armed militants from several factions, similar to the Lion's Den group in Nablus. According to Al-Monitor, the two groups maintain high coordination with each other. The group has a Telegram account with around 66,600 subscribers as of August 15, 2023. According to Moein Odeh, an expert on Palestinian affairs, the Jenin Brigades consist of teenagers and men in their early twenties and do not have a clear hierarchical structure of command, making it difficult to track down members. Observers say that the Jenin Brigades and other similar groups formed amidst "a complete loss of confidence in the Palestinian political leadership".

== Organisation ==
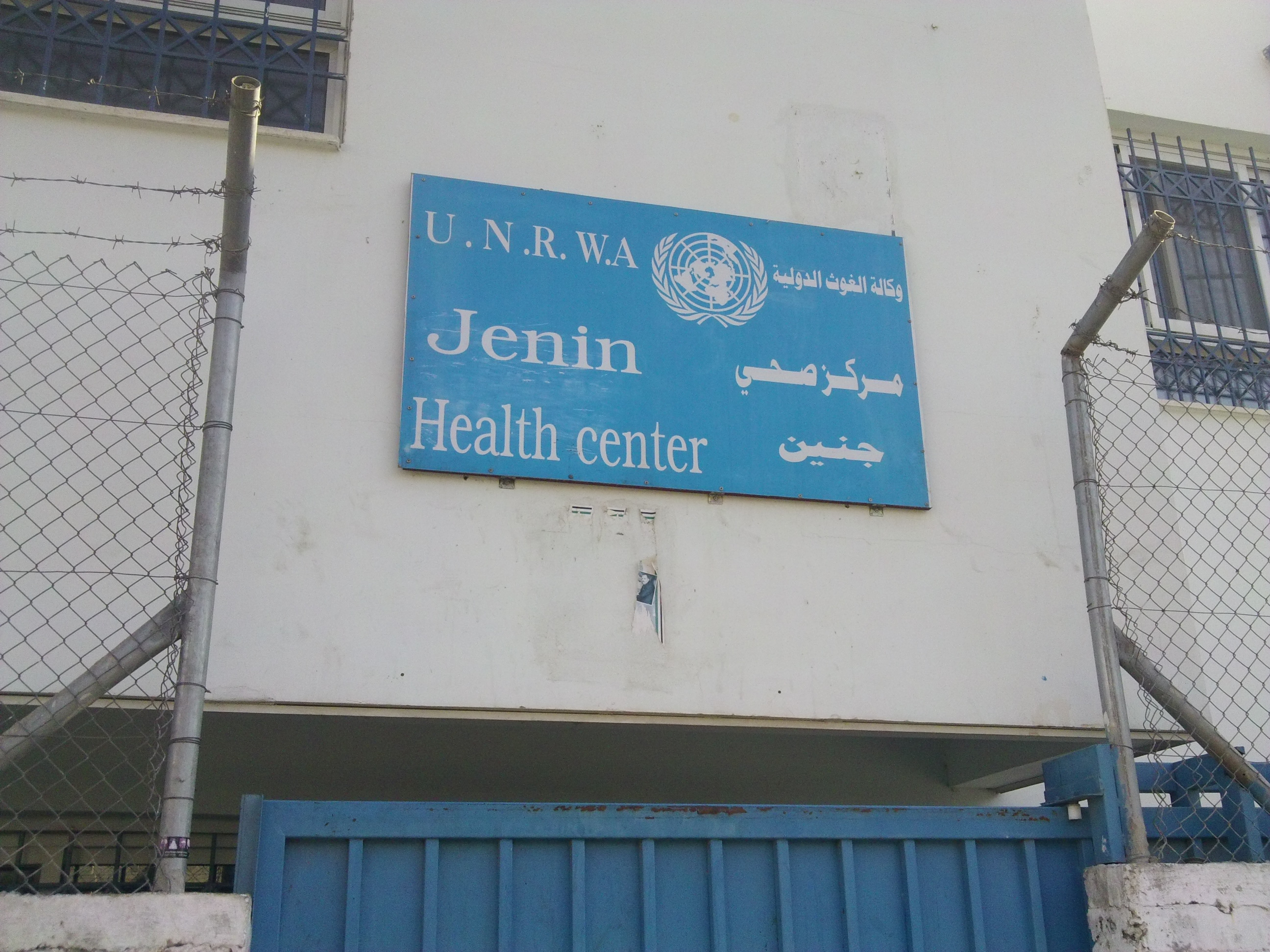
UNRWA Health Center in the Jenin Camp; 2011

The Jenin camp houses mainly the descendants of Palestinian refugees who were displaced form their homes in the regions of Haifa and the Carmel mountains, areas relatively close to the camp's location, allowing the town's population to maintain close ties to their relatives across the Green Line. The Palestinian Central Bureau of Statistics (PCBS) estimates that the population of the Jenin camp will reach 11,674 people by June 2023, while Al Jazeera reports that the camp has a population of more than 22,000 refugees. However, many other sources report a figure between 13,000 and 15,000 refugees, which gives a population density closer to the UNRWA estimate of 33,000/km^{2}. These differences in population counts stem from the fact that many refugees left the camp in the aftermath of the Second Intifada but are still registered refugees, and the fact that a number of registered households live outside formal camp boundaries.

During the first years of the Jenin camp, refugees lived at former barracks that were evacuated by the British Army, then at an abandoned train station from the Ottoman period, then at tents provided by the UNRWA. It wasn't until a few years later that the camp's residents began building mud houses to replace their tents, while concrete houses did not appear until the 1970s. Even today, the camp's residents face problems due to poor sewage networks, and many live in shelters that lack appropriate lighting and ventilation. Moreover, water and electricity shortages have become increasingly common in recent years, particularly in the summer.

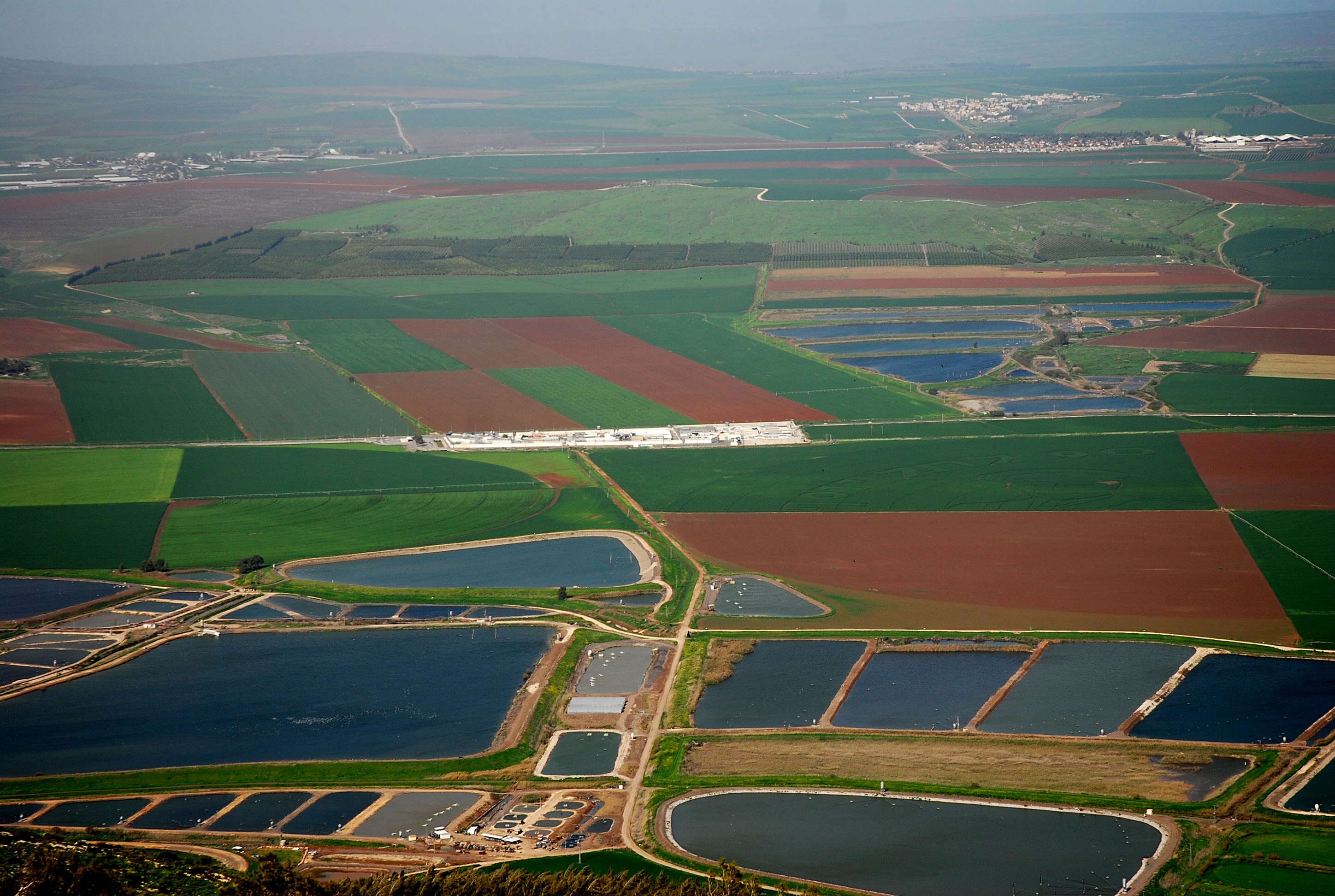
The Jezreel Valley to the north of the Jenin camp

In the camp, there is one health center, administered by the UNRWA, and there are five schools, built with local support from a charitable organization in Nablus. However, difficult economic conditions have raised the pressure on young boys to leave school for work, and on young girls to leave school for marriage. A survey by the IWS found that 14% of married females between 15 and 65 years of age have married under the age of fifteen, and 28% under the age of sixteen. The Jenin camp has an unemployment rate of 22%, compared to the West Bank average of 16%. Many residents previously relied upon work in Israel, but that has become more difficult since the construction of the West Bank Wall and the implementation of the permit regime, which mandates Palestinians to obtain a number of separate permits, issued by the Israeli administration in the West Bank, for a wide range of activities.

Due to its proximity to the Jezreel Valley, the camp has one of the largest fertile plains in Palestine, and is sometimes called the "breadbasket of the West Bank". However, Israeli restrictions have blocked agricultural sales inside Israel, which has led to the devaluation of crops.

== See also ==
- Palestinian refugees
- Palestinian refugee camps
