= January 2023 Jenin incursion =

2023 Israeli raid on a Palestinian camp

January 2023 Jenin incursion (Note: Palestinians and others frequently refer to the assault as the Jenin massacre.)
- Part of the Israeli–Palestinian conflict
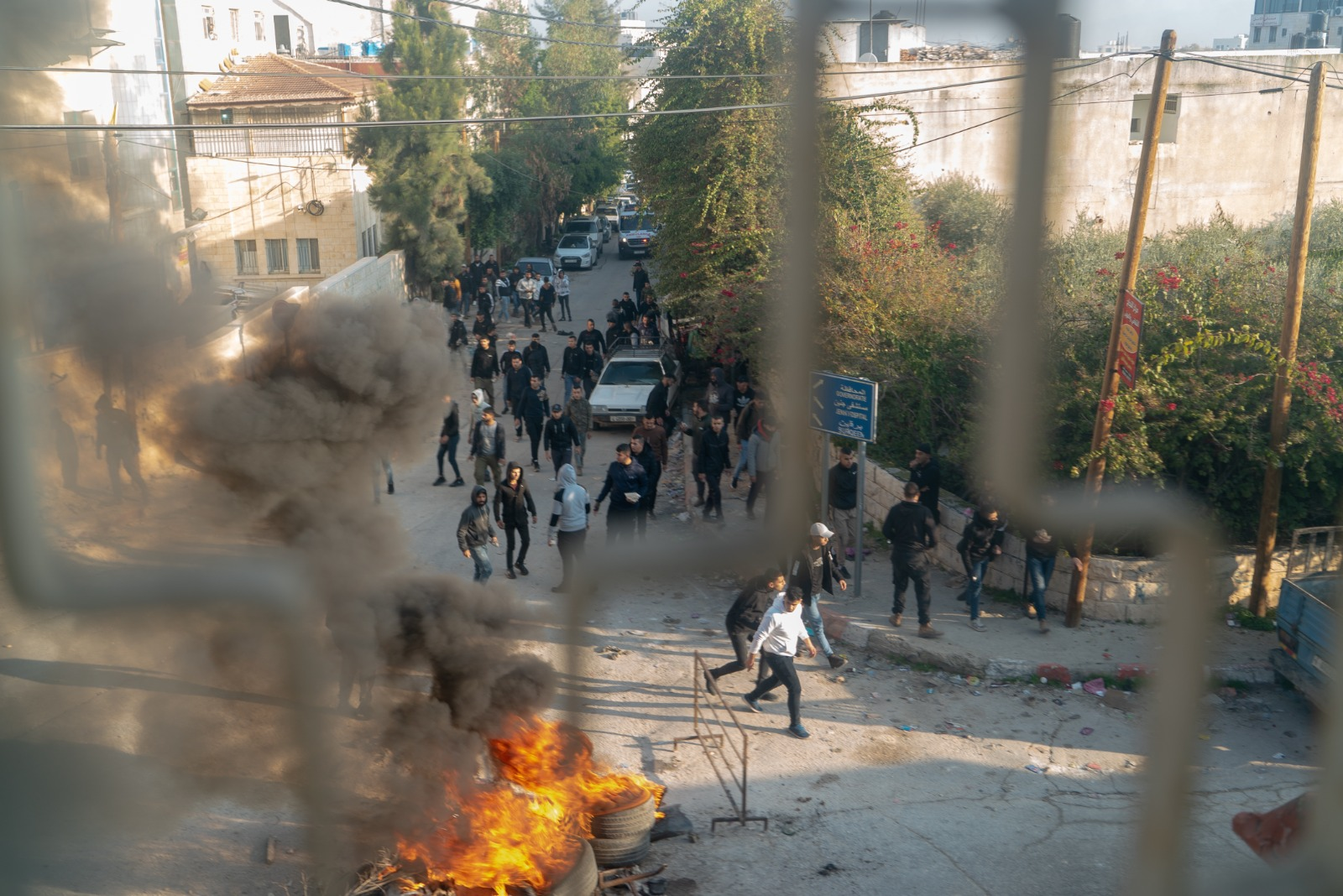
- Date: 26 January 2023
- Location: Jenin Camp, West Bank

Parties
Israel: Israel Defense Forces	Hamas: Izz ad-Din al-Qassam Brigades; Islamic Jihad Movement in Palestine

Casualties and losses
None	7 gunmen killed 1 arrested
- 3 Palestinian civilians killed 19 injured 1 building destroyed

On 26 January 2023, the Israel Border Police and the Israeli army conducted an armed raid on the Jenin refugee camp, which is in Area A of the Israeli-occupied West Bank and under Palestinian civil authority. According to The Jerusalem Post, the objective was to prevent a planned terrorist strike and arrest three wanted Islamic Jihad militants.

Nine Palestinians were killed by Israeli forces during the ensuing clashes, one of whom was an elderly woman. On 29 January, another Palestinian succumbed to wounds received during the raid, bringing the total killed to ten. It was the deadliest Israeli raid on the Jenin refugee camp in nearly 20 years. The Israeli government said at least six of those killed were armed men. The deaths brought the number of Palestinians killed in 2023 to thirty, 20 of whom were killed in Jenin.

On 27 January, UN experts stated "We deplore the Israeli army’s latest violent attack against the Jenin Refugee Camp, and the killing and wounding of Palestinians on Thursday. It shows a dangerous trajectory of violence in the occupied West Bank, continuing the alarming upward trend from 2022". Amnesty International called the killings unlawful and blamed "Israel’s apartheid system" for the ongoing violence including the Jerusalem shooting.

== Background ==
Tensions were rising since the events giving rise to the 2021 Israel–Palestine crisis. In the spring of 2022, attacks by Arab Israelis and Palestinians killed 16 Israelis and two foreigners, following which there has been near nightly army raids in the West Bank. The Israeli military launched what it called Operation Breakwater involving near nightly incursions into Jenin to conduct searches, arrests and home demolitions in the pursuit of armed Palestinian factions. The groups targeted included the Jenin Brigades, cross-factional groups of fighters created, according to Palestinian accounts, to resist the nightly Israeli raiding. The formation of these brigades has become a model for other refugee camps, and villages, across the northern West Bank. Jenin drew world attention in May when Al Jazeera journalist Shireen Abu Akleh was killed while reporting on an army raid in its crowded refugee camp. The August 2022 Gaza-Israel clashes followed a raid on Jenin in which Israeli forces arrested Bassam al-Saadi, a leader of the Palestinian Islamic Jihad in that area.

More than 170 Palestinians, including 30 children, were killed in 2022. Armed militants were a significant proportion of the Palestinian deaths but many were not carrying guns and sometimes they were civilians. Some fatalities arose during protests against Israeli settlers setting up illegal outposts. Israel was repeatedly accused of an excessive use of force, a claim it denies. In 2023, prior to the raid, one-third of the Palestinians killed had ties to armed groups.

== Raid and aftermath ==
Helmet camera video from a Yamam soldier.

Just before 7 am on 26 January 2023, as residents were preparing to go to work or school, an undercover unit in civilian dress penetrated the refugee camp using private cars with Palestinian plates. Soon after, they were joined by dozens of soldiers who had snuck into the camp hidden inside a Palestinian dairy truck. The stated purpose of the incursion was to detain Islamic Jihad militants that Israel claimed had been involved previously in planning and carrying out shooting attacks on Israeli targets. In addition, it was alleged that the group was planning further attacks. One of the oldest camp residents, Ziad Miri’ee, alerted by sudden gunfire, peaked out and observed an Israeli soldier shooting through his car to hit a young local man. Neighbours tried to drag him from the line of fire. A paramedic present at the scene, Abdel-Rahman Macharqa, spoke of trying to pull a civilian, who had been wounded three times, to safety and resuscitating him, only to see him die.

The unit surrounded an apartment in the camp's Joret al-Dahab neighbourhood, a slum of sandstone houses, where several resistance fighters were sheltering and attacked it with anti-tank missiles and explosives. Fire broke out and three militants inside were killed: two were brothers, Mohammad (28 years old) and Nour-al Din Ghneim (25 years old) from the nearby village of Burqin. The third fatality was Mohammad Soboh (30 years old) a camp resident. A fourth member of the group, Izz al-Din Salahat (21 years old), was shot dead further up a nearby street while exchanging fire with the Israelis. On the day, at least 20 other Palestinians were injured by gunfire or tear gas inhalation, with four remaining in a critical condition.

According to a Jenin resident, Mohammed Abu al-Hayja (28 years old), whose home stands a few metres away from the demolished target, after minutes of gunfire Israeli forces broke into his home, handcuffed and blindfolded him though leaving his wife and two young children untouched, and set up a firing position above, on the second floor. Their apartment was then targeted by Palestinian counter-fire and the Israelis sawed the window bars in his bedroom and, from this second position, fired a rocket into the building sheltering the militants, causing a loud explosion.

As fighting broke out, dozens of Israeli armoured vehicles and tractors entered the camp and, for over three hours, exchanged fire with various Palestinian militant factions. Four Hamas militants and one member of Fatah died in the subsequent firefight. Two civilians were also killed. Majida Obaid, an elderly woman (61 years old) and mother of six, was shot through the neck while watching the fight from her bedroom window and died after managing to recite the shahada, a prayer professing one's faith. Her daughter stated that the house continued to be targeted after her mother was hit and that Israeli snipers had been observed on rooftops nearby. The other civilian victim was a 16-year-old boy, Wasim Abu Jaes, who was run over and crushed to death by an Israeli military vehicle. Ambulances trying to succour the wounded were reportedly fired on by Israeli troops who, it is also claimed, fired tear canisters at the nearby Jenin public hospital, causing respiratory problems among a number of children in its paediatric ward. Almost every car and home in the neighbourhood was damaged by gunfire. A 24-year-old man who was suffered a gunshot wound to his stomach during the clashes died at hospital on January 29, bringing the death toll to ten. The operation lasted for three hours and resulted in disturbances among hundreds, and at times thousands, of Palestinian residents in the camp.

In the IDF reconstruction of the incursion as reported in Haaretz, the Israeli soldiers had recourse to anti-tank missiles when the barricaded militants opened fire and threw explosive devices towards the Israeli troops. The official stated that the level of force used was proportional and that if the soldiers had deemed it necessary, air power would also have been employed. The high number of casualties was attributed to the "threat level against troops" and not to any changes in policy, according to the official. Several Palestinian eyewitnesses stated that the house was attacked without any prior notice.

The Israeli military announced that it had targeted Palestinian militant group's training sites after 10 or more rockets were launched from the Gaza Strip; according to the military, four were intercepted, three fell in open areas, and several inside Gaza. Gazan sources told Al Jazeera of at least 13 Israeli airstrikes on al-Maghazi refugee camp after two missile attacks by drones.

On Saturday 4 February, a similar raid was attempted inside another Palestinian refugee camp, Aqabat Jabr in Jericho. It failed to achieve its aims, - seizing two militants suspected of trying to shoot diners in a restaurant in the nearby Israeli West Bank settlement of Vered Yeriho - while leaving seven injured Palestinians in its wake. On 6 February, Israeli forces reraided the camp killing a further five people IDF spokesmen described as 'assailants' firing toward Israeli troops 'operating in the area'. On 22 February, a similar attack consisting of a large contingent of Israeli forces conducted an incursion into the heart of Nablus, and killed two militants reportedly linked to the Lions' Den. Another 8 Palestinians were killed in the raid, and 106 reportedly injured.

== Reactions ==
=== Palestine ===
The Palestinian government expressed its condemnation of the killings, which it described as a massacre. It called for urgent international intervention. Later in the day, the leadership conducted an urgent meeting, and it was declared that security coordination with Israel was no longer in effect. It will also immediately go to the Security Council to request the intervention of the United Nations and resume the effort to join the UN agencies as a full member.

The deputy head of the political bureau of Hamas, Saleh al-Arouri, referred to the events in Jenin as a "massacre" committed by "the occupation", and stated that an armed response "will not take long".

=== International ===
Adam Bouloukos, director of UNRWA Affairs in the West Bank, stated that the raid had left children in Jenin traumatized, calling it an 'invasion' that violated 'not only international law but common decency.'

The Organization of Islamic Cooperation (OIC), based in Jeddah, also condemned the "heinous crime committed by the Israeli occupation." Egypt denounced the Israeli attack and called on it to stop storming Palestinian cities. The UN envoy urged Israeli and Palestinian officials to de-escalate the situation in the West Bank. The Arab League held the Netanyahu government fully responsible for committing the "horrific massacre" and called for international action. Saudi Arabia condemned "the Israeli occupation forces' incursion into the city and camp of Jenin in the sisterly State of Palestine.

The UAE, China and France requested a closed meeting of the Security Council to discuss the killings. Although no statement was issued because, according to a UN diplomat, "It speaks to the recognition by members that they won’t be able to reach a consensus on this issue", the Times of Israel reported that, according to two UN diplomats, instead of addressing the Jenin attack, the meeting instead focused on the subsequent Jerusalem shootings although one diplomat reportedly said that some members were more critical of Israel's role in the ongoing escalation.

Syria's Foreign Affairs and Expatriates Ministry stated: "Israel, the occupying power and its terrorist government, adds this massacre to its history of acts of aggression and killing, taking advantage of the impunity umbrella provided by successive US administrations."

On 1 February 2023, Amnesty's International Secretary General said: "Israeli forces have killed almost 220 Palestinians including 35 in January 2023 alone. Unlawful killings help maintain Israel's apartheid system and constitute crimes against humanity, as do other serious and ongoing violations by Israeli authorities such as administrative detention and forcible transfer.

== See also ==
- Timeline of the Israeli–Palestinian conflict in 2023
- 2023 in the State of Palestine
- Battle of Jenin (2002)
- 2023 East Jerusalem synagogue shooting
