= List of principals of Hertford College, Oxford =

This is a list of Principals of Hertford College, Oxford, including its two predecessor institutions, Hart Hall and Magdalen Hall.

== Principals of Hart Hall (1282–1740) ==
| Principal | Date | Notes |
|---|---|---|
| John Moreman | 1522–1527 | |
| John Whyte | 1527–1535 | |
| John French | 1535–1539 | |
| Roger Bromhall | 1541–1543 | |
| William More | 1543–? | |
| Thomas Vyvyan | ?–1548 | |
| Philip Rondell | 1548–1599 | first long-term Principal, establishing some independence from Exeter College |
| John Eveleigh | 1599–1604 | died of plague in August 1604. |
| Theodore Price | 1604–1622 | |
| Thomas Iles | 1622–1633 | |
| Philip Parsons | 1633–1653 | |
| Philip Stephens | 1654–1660 | appointed by Oliver Cromwell |
| Timothy Baldwyn | 1660–1663 | |
| John Lamphire | 1663–1688 | |
| William Thornton | 1688–1707 | |
| Thomas Smith | 1707–1710 | |
| Richard Newton | 1710–1740 | incorporated Hart Hall as Hertford College, charter granted 1740 |

== Principals of Hertford College, first foundation (1740–1816) ==
| Principal | Date | Notes |
|---|---|---|
| Richard Newton | 1740–1753 | formerly Principal of Hart Hall from 1710 |
| William Sharpe | 1753–1757 | |
| David Durell | 1757–1775 | |
| Bernard Hodgson | 1775–1805 | last Principal of the first foundation |
| Richard Hewitt | 1805–1814/1816 | Vice-Principal in charge |

== Principals of Magdalen Hall, old site (1480–1822) ==
| Principal | Date | Notes |
|---|---|---|
| John Anwykyll | 1480–1488 | first master of the grammar school |
| John Stanbridge | | |
| Richard Berne | | first Principal of Magdalen Hall |
| Thomas Coveney | 1553–1558 | |
| Adrian Hawthorne | 1558–1567 | |
| Robert Lyster | 1567–1602 | matriculated Thomas Hobbes |
| James Hussey | 1602–1605 | |
| John Wilkinson | 1605–? | removed by Royalists |
| Thomas Read | | Royalist appointee |
| John Wilkinson | ?–1648 | restored |
| Henry Wilkinson | 1648–1662 | removed by the Act of Uniformity |
| James Hyde | 1662–1681 | |
| William Levet | 1681–1694 | |
| Richard Adams | 1694–1716 | |
| Digby Cotes | 1716–1745 | |
| William Denison, the Elder | 1745–1755 | |
| William Denison, the Younger | 1755–1786 | |
| Matthew Lamb | 1786–1788 | |
| Henry Ford | 1788–1813 | |
| John Macbride | 1813–1822 | moved Magdalen Hall to the site of Hertford College |

== Principals of Magdalen Hall, new site (1822–1874) ==
| Principal | Date | Notes |
|---|---|---|
| John Macbride | 1822–1868 | became Principal in 1813, moved Magdalen Hall to the Hertford College site |
| Richard Michell | 1868–1874 | incorporated Magdalen Hall as Hertford College |

== Principals of Hertford College, second foundation (1874–) ==
| Principal | Date | Notes |
|---|---|---|
| Richard Michell | 1874–1877 | formerly Principal of Magdalen Hall from 1868 |
| Henry Boyd | 1877–1922 | |
| W. R. Buchanan-Riddell | 1922–1930 | |
| C. R. M. F. Cruttwell | 1930–1939 | |
| Neville Richard Murphy | 1939–1959 | |
| W. L. Ferrar | 1959–1964 | |
| Robert Hall | 1964–1967 | |
| George Lindor Brown | 1967–1971 | |
| Geoffrey Warnock | 1971–1988 | |
| Christopher Zeeman | 1988–1996 | |
| Walter Bodmer | 1996–2005 | |
| John Landers | 2005–2011 | |
| Will Hutton | 2011–2020 | |
| Tom Fletcher | 2020–2024 | |
| Pat Roche | 2024–2026 | Interim Principal |
| Alexandra Freeman | 2026– | |

== Sources ==
- Goudie, Andrew, ed. (1999) [1984]. Seven Hundred Years of an Oxford College: Hertford College, 1284–1984 (2nd ed.). Hertford College, Oxford.
- Hamilton, Sidney Graves (1903). Hertford College. London: F.E. Robinson. OL 23303320M.
