= George Fothergill =

George Fothergill, DD (20 December 1705 – 5 October 1760) was a British academic and Anglican priest. He was principal of St Edmund Hall, Oxford between 1751 and 1760.

== Early life and education ==
The eldest son of Henry Fothergill of Lockholme in Ravenstonedale, Westmorland, and Elizabeth, daughter of Richard Fawcett of Rottenmoor, Warcop, he was born at Lockholme on 20 December 1705. After attending the free school in Ravenstonedale, which had been founded in 1668 by Thomas Fothergill, master of St. John's College, Cambridge, he was sent to Kendal school.

On 16 June 1722 Fothergill entered The Queen's College as batteler. He took the degree of B.A. in 1726, M.A. in 1730, B.D. in 1744, and D.D. in 1749.

== Career ==
Fothergill became chaplain of Queen's in 1730, and was elected to the fellowship which should next fall vacant in 1734. In 1751 the fellows of Queen's appointed him principal of St. Edmund Hall and Vicar of Bramley, Hampshire.

When Dr. Joseph Smith, provost of Queen's, died on 23 November 1756, the fourteen votes of the fellows were equally divided between Fothergill and Dr. Joseph Browne. As the votes remained equal for ten days, it was put to the question whether either candidate had a majority of seniors on his side, and as the number of seniors had apparently never been authoritatively determined, "the electors unanimously agreed upon six as the properest number of seniors, and it appearing that this number was equally divided between the two candidates, and Dr. Browne being the senior candidate, he was (as the statute directs) declared duly elected provost, to which the electors unanimously agreed."

George Fothergill died 5 October 1760, and was buried in St. Edmund Hall.

== Published works ==
Fothergill published at Oxford during his lifetime the following sermons, some of which reached second and third editions:

- Importance of Religion to Civil Societies (preached at the assizes), 1735.
- Danger of Excesses in the Pursuit of Liberty (before the university, 31 Jan.), 1737.
- Unsuccessfulness of Repeated Fasts (before the university), 1745.
- Duty of giving thanks for National Deliverances, 1747.
- Reasons and Necessity of Public Worship (at the assizes), 1753.
- Proper Improvement of Divine Judgments (after the Lisbon earthquake), 1756.
- Condition of Man's Life a constant Call to Industry (before the university), 1757.
- Violence of Man subservient to the Goodness of God (before the university on occasion of the war against France), 1758.
- Duty, Objects, and Offices of the Love of our Country (before the House of Commons on Restoration Day), 1758.

After his death his brother, Thomas Fothergill, provost of Queen's from 1767 to 1796, published Sermons on several Subjects and Occasions by George Fothergill, D.D., Oxford, 1761. In 1765 this volume reappeared, with the same title, as vol. ii. 2nd ed., the nine sermons mentioned above being collected together and printed as vol. i.
