= William Sharpe (academic) =

Oxford college head in the 18th-century

William Sharpe was an Oxford college head.

Sharpe was educated at Westminster School. He was Principal of Hertford College, Oxford, from 1753 to 1757.

Academic offices
Preceded by Richard Newton	Principal of Hertford College, Oxford; 1753–1757	Succeeded by David Durell
