= Patrick Roche =

Patrick Roche may refer to:

- Patrick Roche (athlete) (1886–1917), British sprinter
- Patrick Roche (Wisconsin politician) (1821–?), Wisconsin farmer and politician
- Patrick Roche (Northern Ireland politician) (born 1940), Unionist politician in Northern Ireland
- Patrick Roche (astronomer), interim principal of Hertford College, Oxford, between 2024 and 2026
