= Filippo Grandi =

Italian diplomat

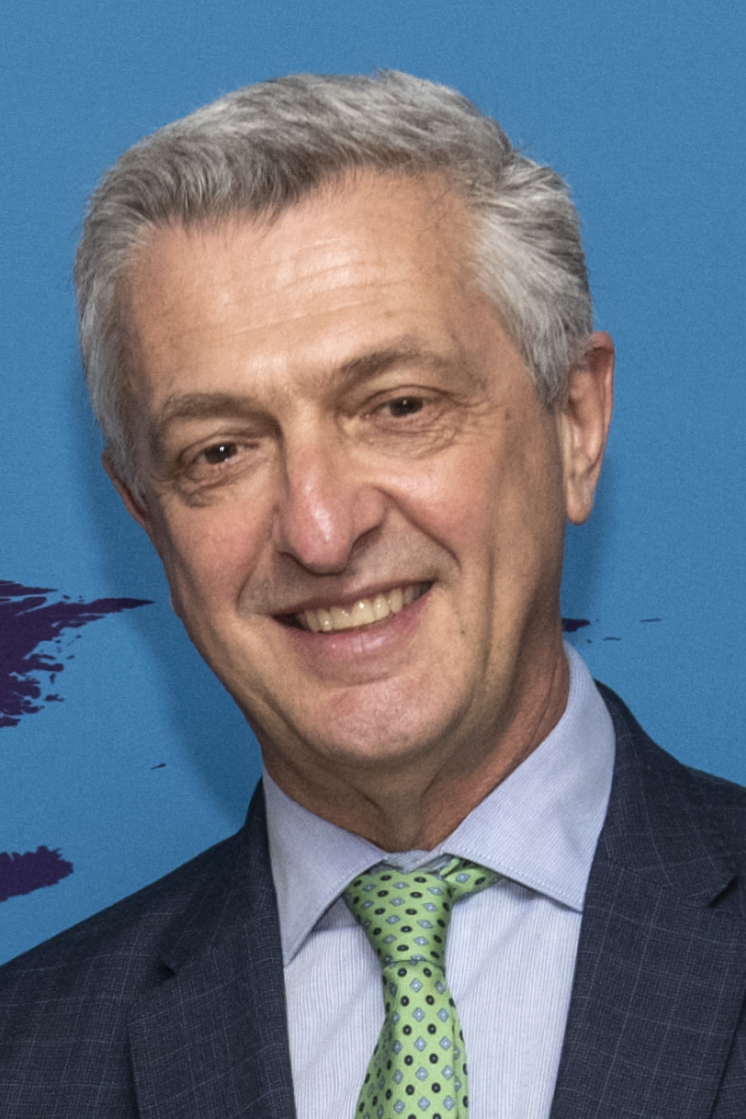
- Grandi in 2019

United Nations High Commissioner for Refugees
- In office 1 January 2016 – 31 December 2025
- Secretary-General: Ban Ki-moon; António Guterres
- Preceded by: António Guterres
- Succeeded by: Barham Salih

Commissioner-General of the UNRWA
- In office 20 January 2010 – 29 March 2014
- Preceded by: Karen Koning AbuZayd
- Succeeded by: Pierre Krähenbühl

Personal details
- Born: 30 March 1957 (age 69) Milan, Lombardy, Italy
- Education: University of Milan; Pontifical Gregorian University

Filippo Grandi (born 30 March 1957) is an Italian humanitarian and United Nations official, who has served as United Nations High Commissioner for Refugees from 2016 to 2025. He previously served as Commissioner-General of the United Nations Relief and Works Agency for Palestine Refugees in the Near East (UNRWA) and United Nations Deputy Special Representative for Afghanistan. He received the Olympic Laureate award during the Paris 2024 Olympics Opening Ceremony.

== Education ==
Grandi graduated with a degree in modern history from the University of Milan in 1981, and with a bachelor's degree in philosophy from the Gregorian University in Rome in 1987.

== Career ==
Grandi started his career in the office of the United Nations High Commissioner for Refugees (UNHCR) in 1988, and has served in a variety of countries, including Sudan, Syria, Turkey, and Iraq after the Gulf War. He also headed a number of emergency operations including in Kenya, Benin, Ghana, Liberia, the Great Lakes Region of Central Africa, Yemen and Afghanistan. Between 1996 and 1997, he was Field Coordinator for UNHCR and United Nations humanitarian activities in the Democratic Republic of Congo during the civil war. From 1997 to 2001, he worked in the Executive Office of the UNHCR in Geneva, as Special Assistant and then Chief of Staff. From 2001 to 2004, he served as the UNHCR's Chief of Mission.

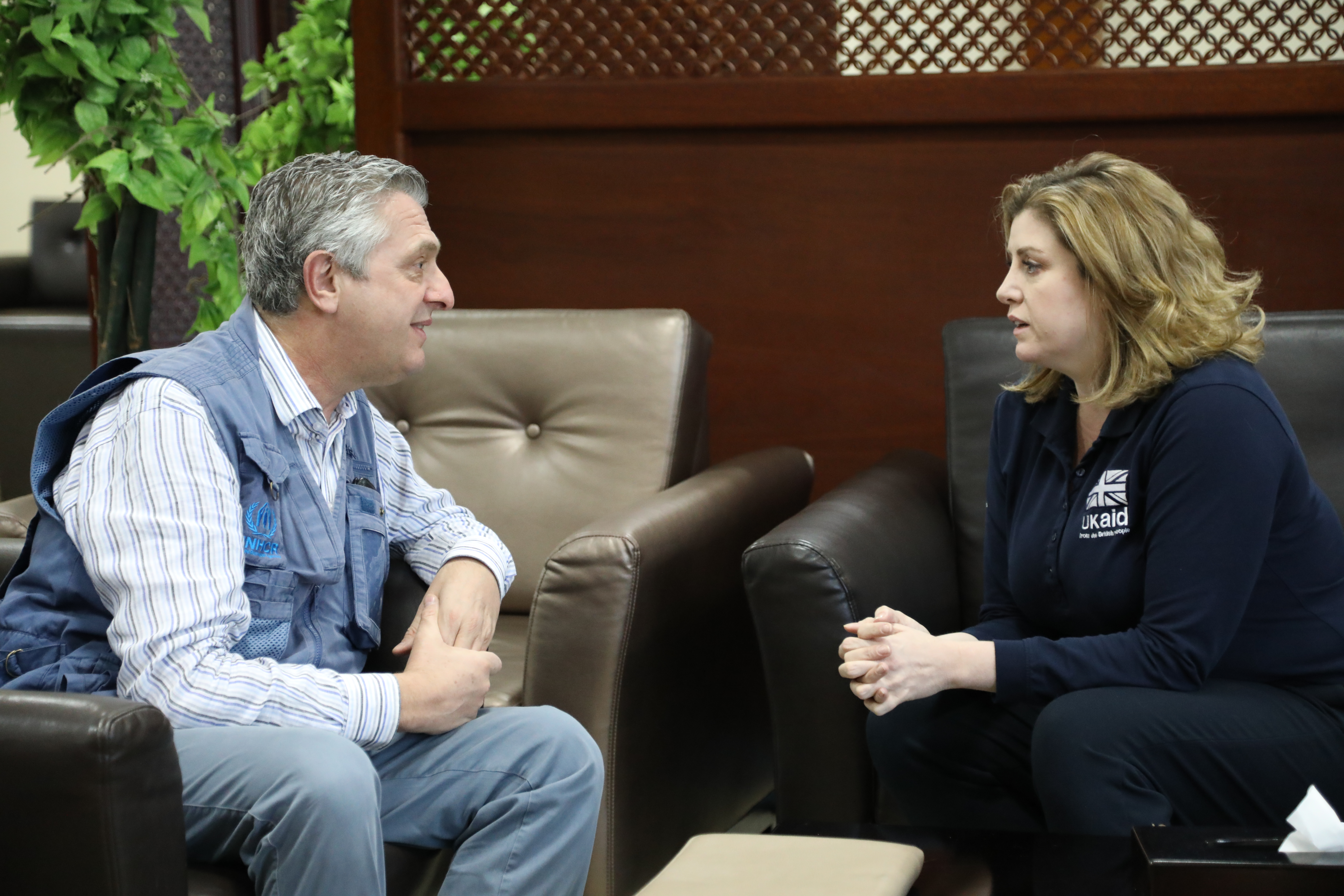
Grandi in Djibouti with Penny Mordaunt

Grandi then moved to the United Nations Assistance Mission in Afghanistan (UNAMA) in 2004, where he served as Deputy Special Representative of the Secretary-General responsible for political affairs from 2004 to 2005. In 2005 he moved to UNRWA, first as Deputy Commissioner-General and then from 2010 as Commissioner-General until 29 March 2014.

On 11 November 2015 UN Secretary-General Ban Ki-moon announced his intention to appoint Grandi as the next United Nations High Commissioner for Refugees to take office in 2016. On 23 November 2020, the United Nations General Assembly re-elected Grandi for an additional 2.5 year mandate as High Commissioner for Refugees.

Since 2019, Grandi has been a member of the World Economic Forum High-Level Group on Humanitarian Investing, co-chaired by Børge Brende, Kristalina Georgieva and Peter Maurer. He participated in the 2026 Winter Olympics opening ceremony.

== Awards ==
- During the 2024 Summer Olympics opening ceremony, Grandi was presented with an Olympic Laurel, the third person to be honored, for his work in helping refugee athletes.
- In July 2025, the Spanish government awarded him the Grand Cross of the Order of Isabella the Catholic.
- In January 2026, the Ukraine government awarded him the Recipients of the Order of Merit, 2nd class.
- In April 2026, the Japanese government awarded him the Grand Cordon of the Order of the Rising Sun.
- In July 2026, the President of the Italian Republic awarded him the Grand Officer of the Order of Merit of the Italian Republic.

== Other activities ==
- Joint United Nations Programme on HIV/AIDS (UNAIDS), Ex-Officio Member of the Committee of Cosponsoring Organizations (since 2016)
- International Gender Champions (IGC), Member
- Paris School of International Affairs (PSIA), Member of the Strategic Committee
- World Economic Forum (WEF), Member of the Global Future Council on the Future of the Humanitarian System

== See also ==
- List of Directors and Commissioners-General of the United Nations Relief and Works Agency for Palestine Refugees in the Near East
- António Guterres – Former UN High Commissioner for Refugees (2005–2015) and current UN Secretary-General.
- Ruud Lubbers – Former UN High Commissioner for Refugees (2001–2005).
- Henrietta Fore – Former Executive Director of UNICEF (2018–2022).
- David Beasley – Executive Director of the World Food Programme (WFP).

Positions in intergovernmental organisations
Preceded by Karen Koning AbuZayd ( (United States) )	Commissioner-General for United Nations Relief and Works Agency for Palestine Refugees in the Near East; 20 January 2010 – 29 March 2014	Succeeded by Pierre Krähenbühl ( (Switzerland) )
Preceded by António Guterres	United Nations High Commissioner for Refugees; 2016–present	Incumbent
