= Thomas Fothergill =

English cleric and academic administrator

Thomas Fothergill D.D.
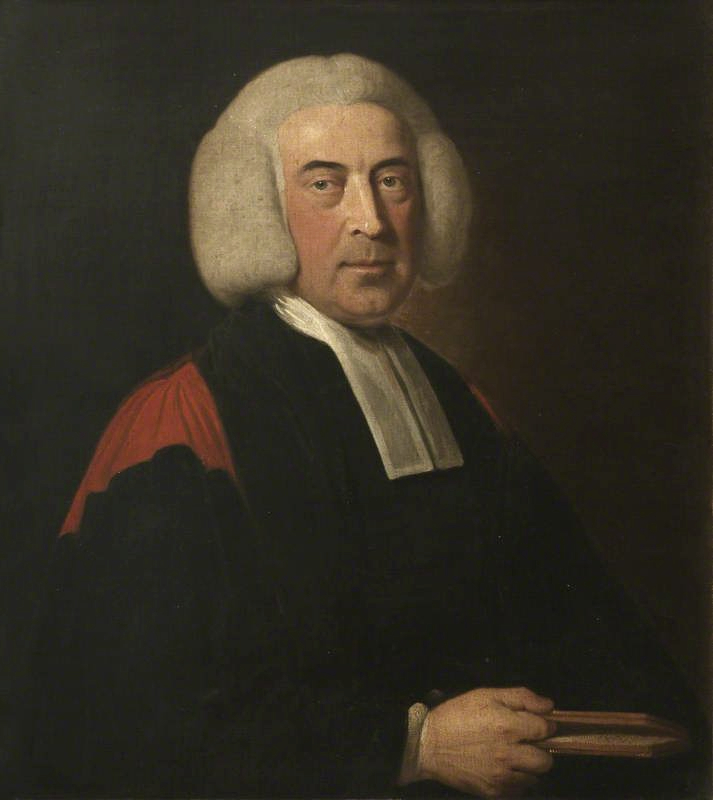
- Thomas Fothergill, 1769 portrait
- Born: 1715/6
- Died: 1796
- Occupations: Anglican priest, academic
- Title: The Reverend

Thomas Fothergill D.D. (1715/6–1796) was an English cleric and academic administrator at the University of Oxford.

== Life ==
He was the son of Henry Fothergill of Westmorland, and brother of George Fothergill. He matriculated at The Queen's College, Oxford in 1734, graduating B.A. 1739 and M.A. 1742. He became a Fellow of the college in 1751.

Fothergill was elected Provost (head of house) of The Queen's College, Oxford in 1767, a post he held until his death in 1796. During his time as Provost, he was also Vice-Chancellor of Oxford University from 1772 until 1776.

== Works ==
- The Qualifications and Advantages of Religious Trust in Times of Danger: A Sermon Preached Before the Mayor and Corporation, at St. Martin's in Oxford, on Friday, February 11, 1757 (1757)

== Family ==
Fothergill married Mary Billingsley, daughter of the Rev. John Billingsley (died 1751), rector of Newington, Oxfordshire. Their son Henry became rector of Althorne.

Academic offices
| Preceded by Joseph Browne | Provost of The Queen's College, Oxford; 1767–1796 | Succeeded by Septimus Collinson |
| Preceded by Nathan Wetherell | Vice-Chancellor of Oxford University; 1772–1776 | Succeeded by George Horne |
