= Pierre Krähenbühl =

Swiss refugee agency official

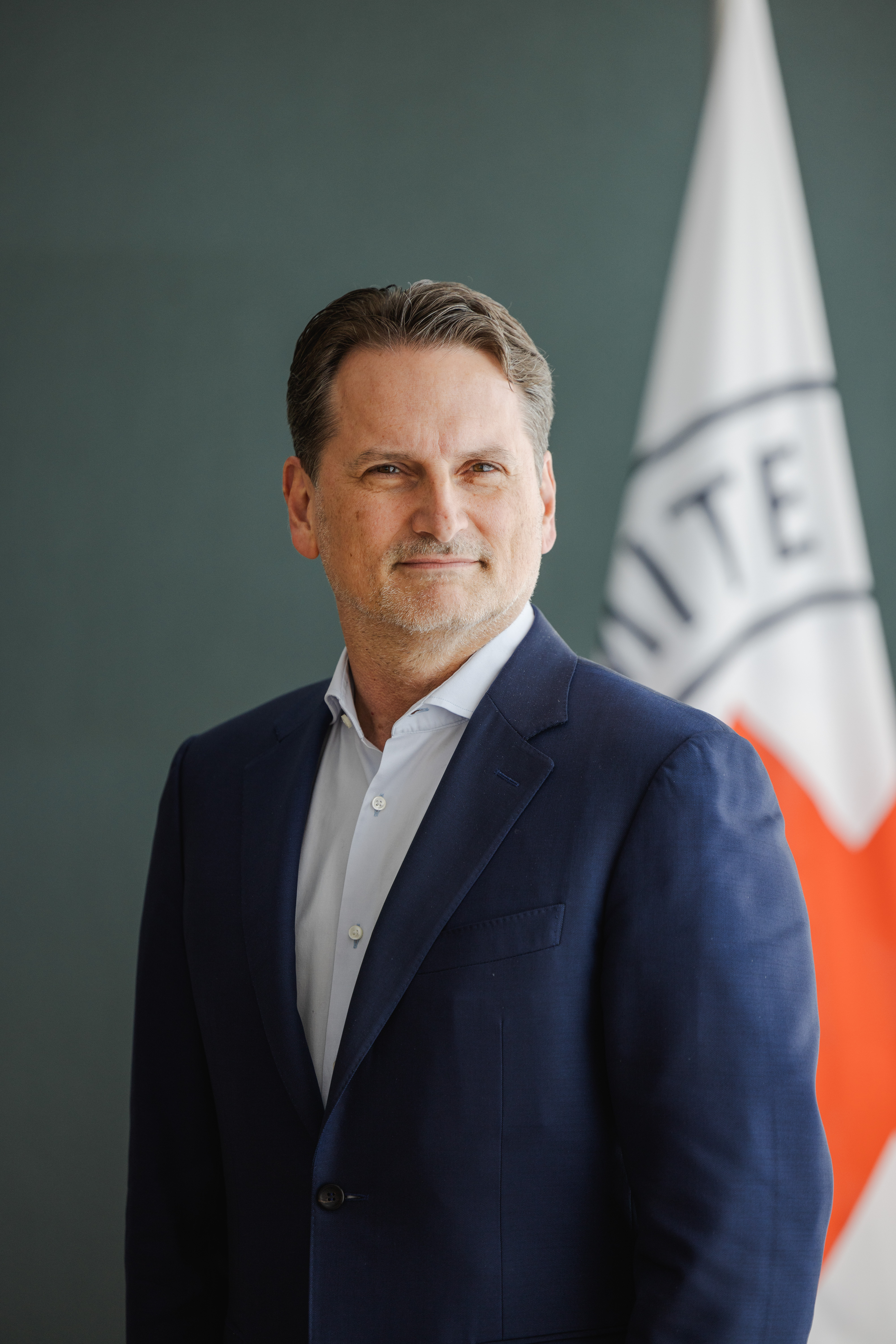
Director-General of the ICRC, Mr. Pierre Krähenbühl

Pierre Krähenbühl (born 8 January 1966) is director-general of the International Committee of the Red Cross (ICRC), the organization’s second-highest-ranking position, a role he began in April 2024. He previously served as ICRC’s Director of Operations from 2002 to early 2014.

== Biography to 2002 ==
Pierre Krähenbühl was born in Geneva, Switzerland. He lived for several years in Greece, Germany, and Sweden as a child. He went to high school and university in his native country, and holds a B.A. in Political Science and International Relations in 1991 from the then University of Geneva-affiliated Graduate Institute of International and Development Studies.

He became a communication assistant with the Lutheran World Federation (LWF) on assignment in Haiti a year after the fall of the Duvalier regime (1987). He worked extensively with labor unions and church base communities, as well as with civil-society activists engaged in improving conditions in their country.

During the years 1988–1991, he returned to Haiti, but also travelled to several countries in Central America, as well as to Ethiopia, for further writing and film documentary production. The documentary Haiti: A Forgotten Nation, which he co-directed with a Latin American journalist, was presented at several European and Latin American film festivals.

Krähenbühl started at the ICRC in late 1991 with an assignment in El Salvador following the ending of the civil war there. From 1992 to 1993, he was posted in Ayacucho, Peru; he worked in Andean villages that had borne the brunt of the violent confrontation between the Shining Path and the Peruvian Armed Forces. The following two years saw him working in Afghanistan: first in Jalalabad (1993), and then in Kabul (1994–95).

He next spent two and a half years in Bosnia and Herzegovina: first in Banja Luka, where he headed the ICRC's office during the upheavals of the final phase of the Bosnian conflict (July to November 1995), and later in Pale and Sarajevo during the first two years of the country's post-war recovery.

Krähenbühl was called back to ICRC headquarters in 1998 to oversee its work in the Balkans, including as head of a task force during the Kosovo conflict in 1999. From 2000 to 2002, he was personal adviser to the ICRC's then-president Jakob Kellenberger before being appointed as Director of Operations in mid-2002.

== Running ICRC operations, 2002-2014 ==
As ICRC Director of Operations, Krähenbühl oversaw the ICRC's response to the consequences of armed conflicts in Afghanistan, Iraq, Sudan, Democratic Republic of the Congo, Libya, Somalia, Ivory Coast, Colombia, and Syria, among other countries. He led senior-level negotiations with governments, armed forces, and non-state armed groups in a number of regions, and engaged in dialogue on humanitarian priorities in the United States, China, Russia, Japan, Brazil, Australia, South Korea, Qatar, Saudi Arabia, Norway, the United Kingdom, France, Germany, and Sweden, as well as with the United Nations, European Union, Organization of Islamic Cooperation, and other international bodies.

In addition to conducting the ICRC's traditionally discreet diplomacy, Krähenbühl spoke publicly about civilians affected by war in Afghanistan, Iraq, Colombia, Sri Lanka, and elsewhere. Following the public release of a confidential report without the consent of the ICRC, Krähenbühl made public comments about the Abu Ghraib torture and prisoner abuse in 2004.

== Running UNRWA ==
From March 2014 to November 2019 he served as Commissioner General for the United Nations Relief and Works Agency for Palestine Refugees in the Near East (UNRWA). He resigned from his position at UNRWA on November 7, 2019 amid allegations of mismanagement; he claimed he was the victim of “dirty politics”. A subsequent internal UN investigation made public by the Swiss television channel RTS completely overturned most of these accusations.

On 29 July 2019, Al Jazeera reported that an internal UNRWA report details alleged abuses of authority among the organization's senior management, including Krähenbühl. According to Al Jazeera, the internal report says that Krähenbühl and other UNRWA leaders pose "an enormous risk to the reputation of the UN" and that "their immediate removal should be carefully considered." Krähenbühl "unreservedly" rejected the characterization of UNRWA and its senior leadership and cited the ongoing investigation by the UN Office of Internal Oversight Services as preventing him from publicly responding to any allegations. On 6 November 2019, the UNRWA released a statement announcing that the UN's Office of Internal Oversight Services (OIOS) completed a part of its ongoing inquiry into UNRWA management-related matters, that its findings revealed management issues which related specifically to Krähenbühl, and that Krähenbühl 'has stepped aside until the completion of the process'. Krähenbühl then resigned.

According to the report from the Swiss radio television program Temps Present, the report of the UN internal investigation does only point to "few elements to charge".

== New ICRC appointments ==
Krähenbühl returned to the ICRC in May 2021 as personal envoy of the ICRC President to China. The ICRC appointed him as its next director-general in December 2023.

In its announcement, the ICRC said that Krähenbühl had dedicated more than 30 years to the humanitarian sector and that he is “recognized as a strategic and purpose-driven leader with deep organization experience and dedication to the ICRC.”

The ICRC told the Swiss newspaper Le Temps that the UN investigations regarding the UNRWA allegations against Krähenbühl found “no evidence of misconduct during his tenure at UNRWA, and there are no ongoing investigations” against him.

== Personal life ==
Pierre Krähenbühl is married to Taiba Rahim, who is the President of the Nai-Qala Association, an organisation dedicated to health and education projects in Afghanistan. They have three sons, Bilal, Elias and Ilham.

Positions in intergovernmental organisations
Preceded by Filippo Grandi ( (Italy) )	Commissioner-General for United Nations Relief and Works Agency for Palestine Refugees in the Near East; March 30, 2014–November 6, 2019	Succeeded by Christian Saunders
