= Yasushi Akashi =

Japanese diplomat and United Nations administrator (born 1931)

- 明石 康
- Akashi in 2001

Under-Secretary-General for Humanitarian Affairs and Emergency Relief Coordinator
- In office 1996–1998
- Preceded by: Peter Hansen
- Succeeded by: Sérgio Vieira de Mello

United Nations Special Representative of the Secretary-General in Cambodia
- In office 1992–1993
- Preceded by: Office established
- Succeeded by: Office abolished Norodom Sihanouk as King of Cambodia

Personal details
- Born: January 19, 1931 (age 95) Hinai, Akita, Japan
- Education: University of Tokyo; Tufts University; University of Virginia, (MA)

Yasushi Akashi (明石 康 Akashi Yasushi, born January 19, 1931) is a Japanese senior diplomat and United Nations administrator.

== Overview ==
Akashi's maternal grandparents are Saitō and Mura Giichi, the breeders of the famous dog Hachikō.

Akashi graduated with Bachelor of Arts degree from the University of Tokyo in 1954, studied as a Fulbright Scholar at the University of Virginia, and later at The Fletcher School of Law and Diplomacy at Tufts University. As a politically appointed International Civil Servant at the Headquarters of the United Nations Secretariat in New York City, he held positions as Under-Secretary-General of Public Information, Under-Secretary-General for Disarmament Affairs and Undersecretary-General for Humanitarian Affairs and Emergency Relief Coordinator.

Among many other additional assignments, he was the Secretary-General's Personal Representative for the war in the former Yugoslavia. He also supervised the Cambodian peace negotiations and subsequent elections in 1993. Despite his successes there, he was strongly criticized for his subsequent role in the Balkans, particularly for failing to enforce the safety of civilians in a number of safe zones, such as Goražde, and his inability to prevent the massacre in Srebrenica.

Akashi was expected to visit Sri Lanka in the last week of September 2006 to help facilitate negotiations between the Tamil Tigers and the Sri Lankan government. In the past, Akashi has met with JVP official Somawansa Amarasinghe.

He ran for Governor of Tokyo in the election of 1999 with the support of the Liberal Democratic Party and New Komeito coalition, but came in fourth place.

== Criticism ==
Akashi has been criticised for his comments in 1992 regarding the treatment of women in Cambodia by UN peacekeepers, where he told a group of aid workers that "'Eighteen-year-old hot-blooded soldiers who come in from the field after working hard should be able to chase after young, beautiful beings of the opposite sex."

== Honors ==
- Honorary citizen of Sochi, Russia (1989).
- Eminent member of the Sergio Vieira de Mello Foundation.
- Sri Lanka Rathna award, Sri Lanka - August 19, 2019.

Positions in intergovernmental organisations
Preceded by Peter Hansen ( (Denmark) )	Under-Secretary-General for Humanitarian Affairs and Emergency Relief Coordinator; 1996–1998	Succeeded by Sérgio Vieira de Mello ( (Brazil) )
