= Alexandra Freeman, Baroness Freeman of Steventon =

British science communicator (born 1974)

The Right Honourable The Baroness Freeman of Steventon
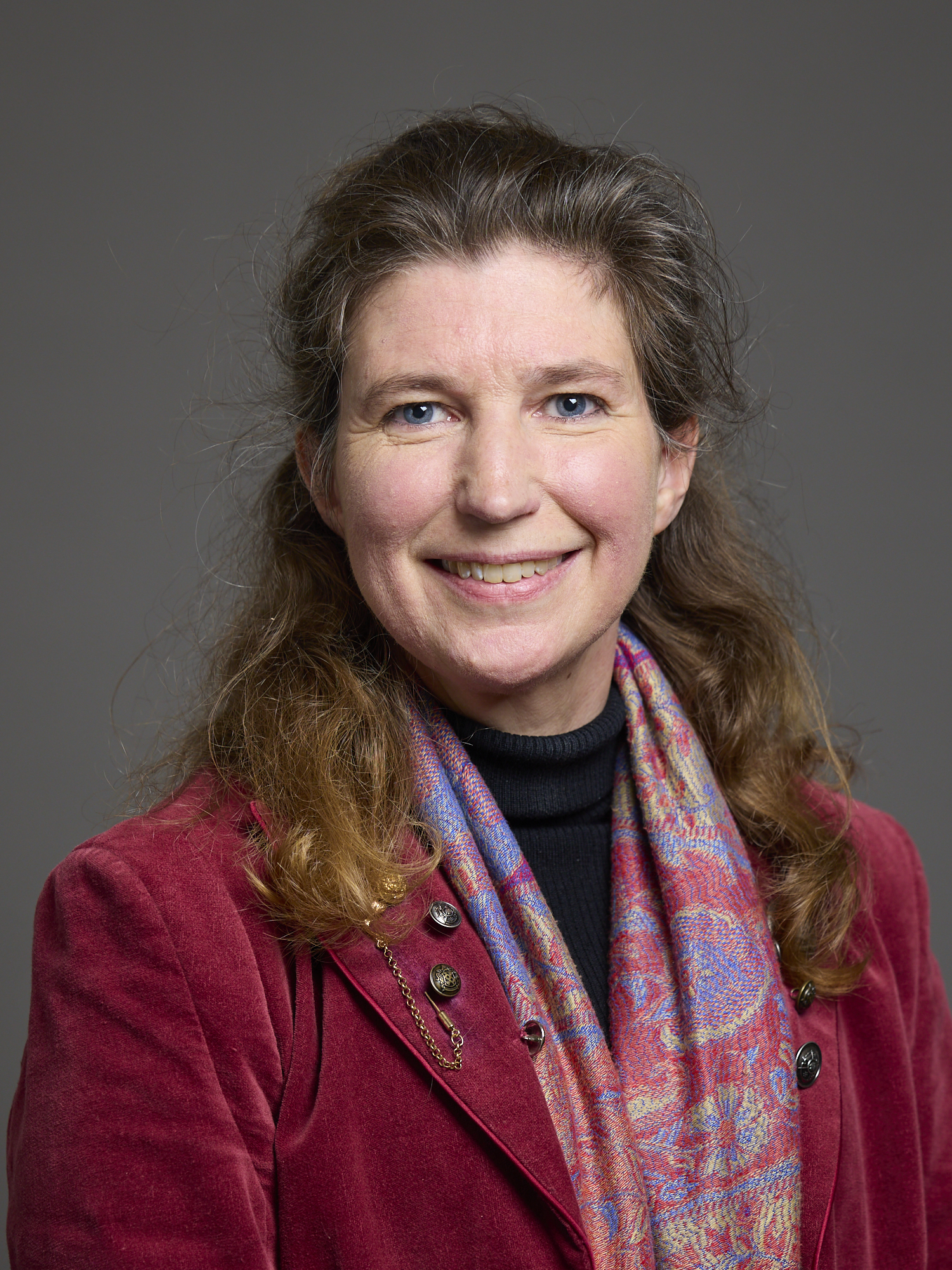
- Official portrait, 2024

Principal of Hertford College, Oxford
- Incumbent
- Assumed office 17 March 2026
- Preceded by: Patrick Roche

Member of the House of Lords
- Lord Temporal
- Life peerage 5 June 2024

Personal details
- Born: Alexandra Lee Jessica Freeman; March 1974 (age 52) Maryland, United States
- Party: None (crossbencher)
- Education: New College, Oxford; Linacre College, Oxford
- Scientific career
- Workplaces: University of Cambridge
- Thesis: Butterflies as Signal Receivers (1998)
- Doctoral advisor: Tim Guilford

Alexandra Lee Jessica Freeman, Baroness Freeman of Steventon (born March 1974) is a British science communicator, life peer, and former television producer. She has been a crossbench member of the House of Lords since 2024, and principal of Hertford College, Oxford since March 2026.

== Biography ==
Freeman was born in March 1974 in Maryland, United States. Her mother is a theoretical physicist, her father trained as a chemist, and her sister is a mathematician. She was educated at Cheltenham Ladies' College, an all-girls independent school in Cheltenham, Gloucestershire, England. She studied biological sciences with biological anthropology at New College, Oxford, graduating in 1995 with a Bachelor of Arts (BA) degree. She remained at the University of Oxford, to undertake a Doctor of Philosophy (DPhil) degree in zoology. Her 1998 doctoral thesis was titled "Butterflies as Signal Receivers" and was supervised by Tim Guilford. One of her tutors was Richard Dawkins. As a postgraduate, she was a member of Linacre College, Oxford, and the Department of Zoology.

From 2000 to 2016, Freeman worked for the BBC, within its BBC Science department and the BBC Studios Natural History Unit. As a producer or director, she was involved in Walking with Beasts, Life in the Undergrowth, Bang Goes the Theory, Climate Change by Numbers and Trust Me, I'm a Doctor.

In 2016, Freeman joined the University of Cambridge as executive director of the Winton Centre for Risk and Evidence Communication in the Faculty of Mathematics.

In 2018, Freeman proposed a new approach to scientific publishing in the form of the Octopus platform designed to publish "smaller units of publication" and to promote the principles of open science. In 2021, Octopus received a grant from Research England to develop the platform into a global service.

Freeman was recommended for appointment as a non-party-political life peer by the House of Lords Appointments Commission in May 2024. She had applied for the role after hearing a member of the House of Lords speak on the radio about the need for more peers who could understand scientific evidence. She was created Baroness Freeman of Steventon, of Abingdon in the County of Oxfordshire, on 5 June 2024, and was introduced to the House of Lords on 29 July as a crossbencher. On 31 October 2024, she made her maiden speech in the Lords during a take-note debate on science and technology contributions to the UK economy.

On 12 November 2025, it was announced that Freeman been elected the next principal of Hertford College, Oxford, replacing interim principal Pat Roche in 2026. She is the first woman to take up the position, having done so on 17 March 2026.

== Selected works ==
- van der Bles, Anne Marthe; van der Linden, Sander; Freeman, Alexandra L. J.; Mitchell, James; Galvao, Ana B.; Zaval, Lisa; Spiegelhalter, David J. (May 2019). "Communicating uncertainty about facts, numbers and science". Royal Society Open Science. 6 (5) 181870. Bibcode:2019RSOS....681870V. doi:10.1098/rsos.181870. PMC 6549952. PMID 31218028.
- van der Bles, Anne Marthe; van der Linden, Sander; Freeman, Alexandra L. J.; Spiegelhalter, David J. (7 April 2020). "The effects of communicating uncertainty on public trust in facts and numbers". Proceedings of the National Academy of Sciences. 117 (14): 7672–7683. Bibcode:2020PNAS..117.7672V. doi:10.1073/pnas.1913678117. PMC 7149229. PMID 32205438.
- Dryhurst, Sarah; Schneider, Claudia R.; Kerr, John; Freeman, Alexandra L. J.; Recchia, Gabriel; van der Bles, Anne Marthe; Spiegelhalter, David; van der Linden, Sander (2 August 2020). "Risk perceptions of COVID-19 around the world". Journal of Risk Research. 23 (7–8): 994–1006. doi:10.1080/13669877.2020.1758193. hdl:11370/cae04236-b763-4ed8-9ace-63e19f717ec8.
- Roozenbeek, Jon; Schneider, Claudia R.; Dryhurst, Sarah; Kerr, John; Freeman, Alexandra L. J.; Recchia, Gabriel; van der Bles, Anne Marthe; van der Linden, Sander (October 2020). "Susceptibility to misinformation about COVID-19 around the world". Royal Society Open Science. 7 (10) 201199. Bibcode:2020RSOS....701199R. doi:10.1098/rsos.201199. PMC 7657933. PMID 33204475.
- Freeman, Alexandra LJ; Parker, Simon; Noakes, Catherine; Fitzgerald, Shaun; Smyth, Alexandra; Macbeth, Ron; Spiegelhalter, David; Rutter, Harry (December 2021). "Expert elicitation on the relative importance of possible SARS-CoV-2 transmission routes and the effectiveness of mitigations" (PDF). BMJ Open. 11 (12) e050869. doi:10.1136/bmjopen-2021-050869. PMC 8637346. PMID 34853105.
