= Septimus Collinson =

British theologian and college administrator (1739–1827)

Septimus Collinson (11 September 1739 – 24 January 1827) was an English churchman and cleric, provost of Queen's College, Oxford from 1796 for the rest of his life.

== Early life ==
He was the seventh son of Joseph and Agnes Collinson, born at Gotree (Gawtree), near Hunsonby, Cumberland. He was brought up at Great Musgrave, Westmorland, where his parents had purchased a small estate.

Collinson was educated at Appleby Grammar School, under Richard Yates, a contemporary there of John Langhorne. He spent a year 1758–9 teaching there as an usher. He matriculated in 1759 at The Queen's College, Oxford, graduating B.A. in 1763 and M.A. in 1767. He was ordained deacon in 1767 and priest in 1768.

== Cleric ==
In 1774 Collinson was made rector of Earnshill, a very small parish and sinecure. He became a Fellow of Queen's College in 1777. In 1778 he was presented to the rectories of Dowlish Wake and Dowlish West, Somerset; the latter was a sinecure, with a ruined church. The presentation belonged to the Speke family of Jordans, Ashill, Somerset.

Collinson graduated B.D. in 1792, and D.D. in 1793. For some years he was one of the city lecturers at Oxford. In 1794 Collinson accepted the college living of Holwell, Dorset, but remained there only about two years.

== Provost of Queen's College ==
In 1796 Collinson was appointed provost of Queen's College on the death of Thomas Fothergill. In 1798 he obtained the Lady Margaret professorship of Divinity at Oxford, with a prebend of Worcester Cathedral. He had additional preferment as perpetual curate of Mortlake in 1799, and rector of South Weston in 1801.

When John Bristed (1778–1855), father of Charles Astor Bristed, came to see Collinson at the beginning of his time as Provost, about a career in the Church of England, he was discouraged, on the grounds that advancement was not on merit, and there were too many clergy.

Collinson's lectures on the Thirty-nine Articles, though admired at the time of their delivery, were not printed. He was a frequent preacher before the university. He died at the college lodge on 24 January 1827.

=== St Bees School ===
Over the course of the 18th century, academic standards at Queen's College fell, with the "decline of the northern grammar schools" which were its traditional catchment area for scholarship boys. Collinson as Provost of Queen's was ex officio a governor of St Bees School in Cumberland. From 1811, Collinson set about improving the school, from the point of staff and finances.

As Provost, on the death of headmaster John Barnes, Collinson appointed the Rev. William Wilson, a Queen's graduate from Kendal who after ordination as priest in 1808 had become a curate at Colne Engaine in Essex. Wilson looked into the details of a mineral rights lease, affecting coal from the school grounds, that had been granted in the first half of the 18th century to Sir James Lowther, 4th Baronet. This was a sensitive matter, considering that William Lowther, 1st Earl of Lonsdale, one of the governors, was from the Lowther family.

Wilson determined to pursue the matter of the mineral rights lease, which appeared to set a peppercorn rent for the coal taken, with the Lord Chancellor. He found his position at the school was made difficult in 1814, by Lord Lonsdale's allies. An evangelical, he saw his religious activities scrutinised by George Henry Law, his diocesan bishop. Law was also in process of setting up St Bees Theological College, established 1817; and the Lowthers were in 1816 offering to restore a ruined monastery to house it. Elected a Fellow of Queen's College in 1815, Wilson left the school for Oxford in mid-1817.

Collinson persisted in the effort to have the mineral rights lease set aside. A court judgement went his way, given on the day he died in 1827. Lord Lonsdale had been required to pay into court for coal taken, and gave money to expand the school. He was granted a new long lease, at a market rent.

== Legacy ==
A manuscript "Memoirs of Egglesfield", mostly written by Collinson, was left to his college. It relates to Eaglesfield, supposed birthplace of Robert de Eglesfield, founder of the college.

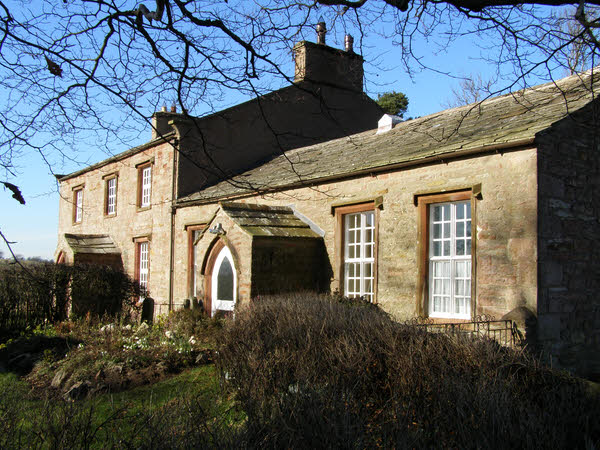
Old School building at Langrigg, Great Musgrave, 2008 photograph

Collinson left money to found a free school at Great Musgrave, to be run on the monitorial system. Dr Collinson's Trust is now a charity. A school and residence were built on the common at Langrigg, near Great Musgrave, with extra money donated by two nephews, and timber given by Sir Christopher John Musgrave, 9th Baronet, a cleric, of the Hartley Castle baronets. His nephew John Collinson preached a sermon in 1829 on Galatians 6:7 for the first appointment of a schoolmaster. A monument commemorating SeptimusCollinson was placed on the north wall of the nave of St Theobald's Church, Great Musgrave.

Collinson also had revived the rushbearing custom at Great Musgrave and Warcop.
