= Peter Hansen (diplomat) =

Danish diplomat

Commissioner-General of the United Nations Relief and Works Agency for Palestine Refugees in the Near East
- In office 20 January 1996 – 31 March 2005
- Preceded by: İlter Türkmen
- Succeeded by: Karen Koning AbuZayd

Under-Secretary-General for Humanitarian Affairs and Emergency Relief Coordinator
- In office March 1994 – 1996
- Preceded by: Jan Eliasson
- Succeeded by: Yasushi Akashi

Personal details
- Born: 2 June 1941 (age 85) Aalborg, Denmark
- Education: Aarhus University
- Occupation: Diplomat

Peter Hansen (born 2 June 1941) is a Danish diplomat who was commissioner-general of the United Nations Relief and Works Agency for Palestine Refugees in the Near East (UNRWA) from 1996 to 2005.

== Academic career ==
After completing graduate and postgraduate studies in political science at Aarhus University in 1966, Hansen joined the staff of the university as an assistant professor in international relations.

== Diplomatic career ==
In 1978, Hansen joined the United Nations as assistant secretary-general for programme planning and coordination. Between 1985 and 1992, he served as assistant secretary-general and executive director of the United Nations Centre on Transnational Corporations. In March 1994, he took over the post of Undersecretary-General for Humanitarian Affairs and Emergency Relief Coordinator.

During his UN tenure, he has served as chairman of the organization's appointment and promotion board and various committees and as the secretary-general's representative to the World Food Programme. He also served as the special representative of the secretary-general to the ad hoc liaison committee established to follow up the Washington Conference in support of the Middle East peace process.

== Commissioner-general of UNRWA ==
Hansen was appointed commissioner-general of UNRWA by UN Secretary-General Boutros Boutros-Ghali on 20 January 1996 and took office on 1 March 1996. His term ended on 31 March 2005 and he retired from United Nations service. Hansen had been critical of Israeli actions, and UN sources said the US had opposed his reappointment.

== See also ==
- List of Directors and Commissioners-General of the United Nations Relief and Works Agency for Palestine Refugees in the Near East

Positions in intergovernmental organisations
Preceded by Jan Eliasson ( (Sweden) )	Undersecretary-General for Humanitarian Affairs and Emergency Relief Coordinator; 1994–1996	Succeeded by Yasushi Akashi ( (Japan) )
Preceded by İlter Türkmen ( (Turkey) )	Commissioner-General for United Nations Relief and Works Agency for Palestine Refugees in the Near East; February 29, 1996–20 January 2010	Succeeded by Karen Koning AbuZayd ( (United States) )
