= Karen Koning AbuZayd =

Karen Koning AbuZayd (born August 21, 1941) is a senior official of the United Nations. She is currently serving as a Commissioner on the Independent International Commission of Inquiry on the Syrian Arab Republic. On January 5, 2016, she was appointed United Nations Special Adviser on the Summit on Addressing Large Movements of Refugees and Migrants held on September 19, 2016. The Summit resulted in the New York Declaration for Refugees and Migrants.

Prior to this she was a Commissioner-General for the United Nations Relief and Works Agency for Palestine Refugees in the Near East (UNRWA) from June 28, 2005, to January 20, 2010, appointed by Kofi Annan. She was succeeded by her deputy Filippo Grandi. She currently serves on the board of directors of UNRWA USA, a Washington–DC based 501c3 nonprofit which aims to educate the general American public about the situation of Palestine refugees and generate support for UNRWA's work.

== United Nations career ==
AbuZayd worked as chief of mission for United Nations High Commissioner for Refugees (UNHCR) in Sarajevo during the Bosnian War. Before joining to the UN, AbuZayd lectured in Political Science and Islamic Studies. She is married and has two children. She graduated from DePauw University in 1963 and is an alumna of Kappa Alpha Theta sorority.

== Later career ==
AbuZayd is a current member of the board of directors at the Middle East Policy Council in Washington, D.C.

Positions in intergovernmental organisations
Preceded by Peter Hansen ( (Denmark) )	Commissioner-General for United Nations Relief and Works Agency for Palestine Refugees in the Near East; June 28, 2005–January 20, 2010	Succeeded by Filippo Grandi ( (Italy) )
