= Neville Richard Murphy =

British classicist (1890–1971)

Neville Richard Murphy (3 March 1890 – 15 July 1971) was Principal of Hertford College, Oxford from 1939 to 1959.

== Life and career ==
Murphy was educated at Christ's Hospital and Brasenose College, Oxford. During World War I he served as an officer in the Royal Irish Fusiliers. A classicist and horologist, he was a fellow and tutor at Hertford College, Oxford, from 1919 to 1939, and Principal of Hertford from 1939 to 1959.

The official history of Oxford University uses Murphy as an example of an eccentric don: he was known as the "undisclosed principal" because of his reticence and for repairing watches for undergraduates better than the college porter.

His book, The Interpretation of Plato's Republic, was published by Oxford University Press in 1951.

His portrait by Stanley Spencer hangs in the Senior Common Room at Hertford College.

Academic offices
Preceded by Charles Crutwell	Principal of Hertford College, Oxford; 1939–1959	Succeeded by Bill Ferrar
