= Adjournment debate =

Form of parliamentary debate

In the Westminster system, an adjournment debate is a debate on the motion, "That this House do now adjourn." In practice, this is a way of enabling the House to have a debate on a subject without considering a substantive motion.

== Types of debate ==
There are generally two types of adjournment debate: those proposed by the government, which are used from time to time to permit general debates on topical subjects (e.g. flooding and coastal defenses, regional affairs or International Women's Day); and the half-hour adjournment at the end of each day's sitting. The half-hour adjournment is an opportunity for a backbench Member of parliament to raise a subject of their choosing, of which advance notice has been given, with the appropriate government minister. Normally, only the member raising the debate and the minister who is replying speak in the half-hour adjournment. It is not uncommon for the chamber otherwise to be empty.

The convention is that any subject may be raised on a motion for the adjournment, since any matter of national or local importance may offer a good reason for the House to continue sitting (i.e. the House should not adjourn until it has considered the topic in hand).

It is not usual for the House to vote on the adjournment motion; it is either agreed to without a vote, or it lapses once the allotted time has expired. On rare occasions, however, where the debate concerns a matter on which there are strong differences of opinion (such as the prospect of going to war), backbench members may engineer a vote. It was a vote on a motion for the adjournment which brought down British Prime Minister Neville Chamberlain's government during World War II – the so-called Norway Debate. Though Chamberlain won the vote (with the Government voting 'Aye', their opponents 'No'), his government's majority was considerably reduced to the point that his credibility was fatally undermined and he felt obliged to resign two days later.

In the House of Commons of Canada, coming as it does at the end of the sitting day, the adjournment debate is colloquially known as the "late show."

== See also ==
- Take-note debate
