= David Durell =

David Durell D.D. (1728–1775) was Principal of Hertford College, Oxford, from 1757 to 1775, Vice-Chancellor of the University of Oxford from 1765 to 1768, and a noted Old Testament scholar of his day.

== Birth and career ==
David Durell, son of Thomas Durell, was born of a prosperous family in Jersey in 1728. He went to Cowbridge School in the Vale of Glamorgan, Wales, 1741–7.

In March 1747, Durell entered Pembroke College, Oxford and graduated B.A. in 1750 and M.A. in 1753, becoming a Fellow of the new Hertford College that year. On 12 November 1757 he was appointed Principal of Hertford College. He held concurrently with his principalship a vicarage in Sussex and (from 13 January 1767) a canonry in Canterbury Cathedral.

On Tuesday 8 October 1765, Durell was invested as Vice-Chancellor of the University of Oxford. His tenure is notable for the expulsion of six students from St Edmund Hall for holding unauthorized prayer meetings.

== Scholarship ==
Durell gained his Bachelor of Divinity in 1760 and his Doctorate of Divinity in 1764. Durell was an industrious scholar of the Old Testament. In the 1760s and 1770s he variously and extensively commented on, translated, and edited parts of the Scriptures which treated of Abraham, Jacob, Moses, and the Books of Job, Proverbs, Psalms, and Ecclesiastes, and the Canticles. He was also an ardent advocate of a new translation of the Bible to improve on the Authorized Version.

== Death and burial ==
Durell died on 16 October 1775 and was buried at the church of St Peter-in-the-East in Oxford, now the library of St Edmund Hall.

== Bibliography ==
- Davies, Iolo, A Certaine Schoole (Cowbridge: D. Brown and Sons, 1967), Chapter II, esp. pp. 41–3 and 49–53 — for information about Durell's schooldays
- Goudie, Andrew, Seven Hundred Years of an Oxford College: Hertford College, 1284–1984 (Hertford College, 1984), pp. 33–4 — on Fox at Hertford College
- Hamilton, S. G., Hertford College (F. E. Robinson & Co., 1903) pp 86–91
- Hibbert, Christopher (ed.), The Encyclopaedia of Oxford (London: Macmillan, 1988), entry on Hertford College
- Jenkins, Philip, The Making of a Ruling Class: The Glamorgan Gentry 1640–1790 (Cambridge University Press, 1983), pp. 217–20
- Sutherland, L. S. & Mitchell, L. G.(ed), History of the University of Oxford, Vol. V, The Eighteenth Century (Oxford University Press, 1986), pp. 154, 165, 201, 410, 461
- Jackson’s Oxford Journal for 19 November 1757 (appointed Principal of Hertford); 16 January 1767 (appointed Canon of Canterbury); 21 October 1775 (obituary)
- Victoria County History (1954) Oxfordshire, pp. 309–19 — on non-appointment of tutors, and undergraduate numbers.
- Will of David Durell (proved 24 January 1776 at Prerogative Court at Canterbury). Index to will register at National Archives PROB 11/1015 accessed 2 August 2010.

Academic offices
| Preceded by William Sharpe | Principals of Hertford College, Oxford; 1757–1775 | Succeeded by Bernard Hodgson |
| Preceded by Joseph Browne | Vice-Chancellor of Oxford University; 1765–1768 | Succeeded by Nathan Wetherell |
