= Charles Thomas Cruttwell =

English cleric, headmaster and classical scholar

Charles Thomas Cruttwell (1847–1911) was an English cleric, headmaster and classical scholar, known as a historian of Roman literature.

== Life ==
He was born in London on 30 July 1847, eldest son of Charles James Cruttwell, barrister-at-law, of the Inner Temple, and his wife Elizabeth Anne, daughter of Admiral Thomas Sanders. Educated under James Augustus Hessey at Merchant Taylors' School, London (1861–6), he went on with a foundation scholarship to St John's College, Oxford, in 1866. Placed in the first class in classical moderations in 1868 and in literæ humaniores in 1870, he obtained the Pusey and Ellerton Hebrew scholarship in 1869, won the Craven scholarship for classics in 1871, and the Kennicott Hebrew Scholarship in 1872. He graduated B.A. in 1871, proceeding M.A. in 1874, and was classical moderator (1873–5). Meanwhile, he was elected fellow of Merton College in 1870, and was tutor there 1874–7.

Ordained deacon by the bishop of Oxford in 1875 and priest in 1876, Cruttwell was curate of St Giles', Oxford, from 1875 till 1877 when he left for Bradfield College, where he was headmaster. In 1880 he moved on to the headmastership of Malvern College, resigning in 1885 to become rector of Sutton, Surrey. A few months later he was appointed rector of Denton, Norfolk, and in 1891 he accepted from Merton College the benefice of Kibworth-Beauchamp in succession to Edmund Knox. While at Kibworth he was also rector of Smeeton-Westerby, Leicestershire (1891–4), rural dean of Gartree (1892–1902), examining chaplain to the bishop of Peterborough (1900), and proctor in convocation (1900).

In 1901 Cruttwell was nominated by Lord Salisbury to the crown benefice of Ewelme, Oxfordshire, and in 1903 he was collated by the bishop of Peterborough to a residential canonry. Cruttwell was also select preacher to Oxford University in 1896–8, and again in 1903–5. In 1909 he joined a clerical party who visited Germany in the cause of international peace. He died at Ewelme on 4 April 1911.

== Works ==
Cruttwell published:

- A History of Roman Literature (London and Edinburgh, 1877)
- Specimens of Roman Literature (Glasgow, 1879), with the Rev. Peake Banton
- A Literary History of Early Christianity (2 vols. 1893)
- The Saxon Church and Norman Conquest (1909)
- Six Lectures on the Oxford Movement (1899).

== Family ==
Cruttwell married on 5 August 1884 Anne Maude, eldest daughter of Sir John Robert Mowbray, 1st Baronet. They had three sons, including Charles Robert Mowbray Fraser Cruttwell, and one daughter.

== Notes ==
Attribution

This article incorporates text from a publication now in the public domain: Lee, Sidney, ed. (1912). "Cruttwell, Charles Thomas". Dictionary of National Biography (2nd supplement). Vol. 1. London: Smith, Elder & Co.
