= Nathan Wetherell =

English theologian and academic administrator

Nathan Wetherell D.D. (1726–1808) was an academic administrator at the University of Oxford. He was Dean of Hereford, Master of University College, Oxford and Vice-Chancellor of Oxford University.

Nathan Wetherell was originally from Durham.

As Vice-Chancellor of Oxford, he set up the Oxford Paving Commission in 1771 to supervise paving, cleaning and lighting in the city of Oxford. He supported anti-Calvinism, along with David Durell and Thomas Randolph. Wetherell was a longtime friend of Samuel Johnson.

A memorial to Wetherell was erected in University College Chapel at Oxford University sculpted by John Flaxman.

== Family ==
Wetherell was married to Richarda Croke (1743?–1812), sister of Sir Alexander Croke, of Studley Priory, Oxfordshire. His third son was the judge and Member of Parliament, Sir Charles Wetherell (1770–1846).

Academic offices
Preceded by John Browne	Master of University College, Oxford; 1764–1807	Succeeded by James Griffith
Preceded by David Durell	Vice-Chancellor of Oxford University; 1768–1772	Succeeded by Thomas Fothergill
