= Jan Eliasson =

Swedish diplomat (born 1940)

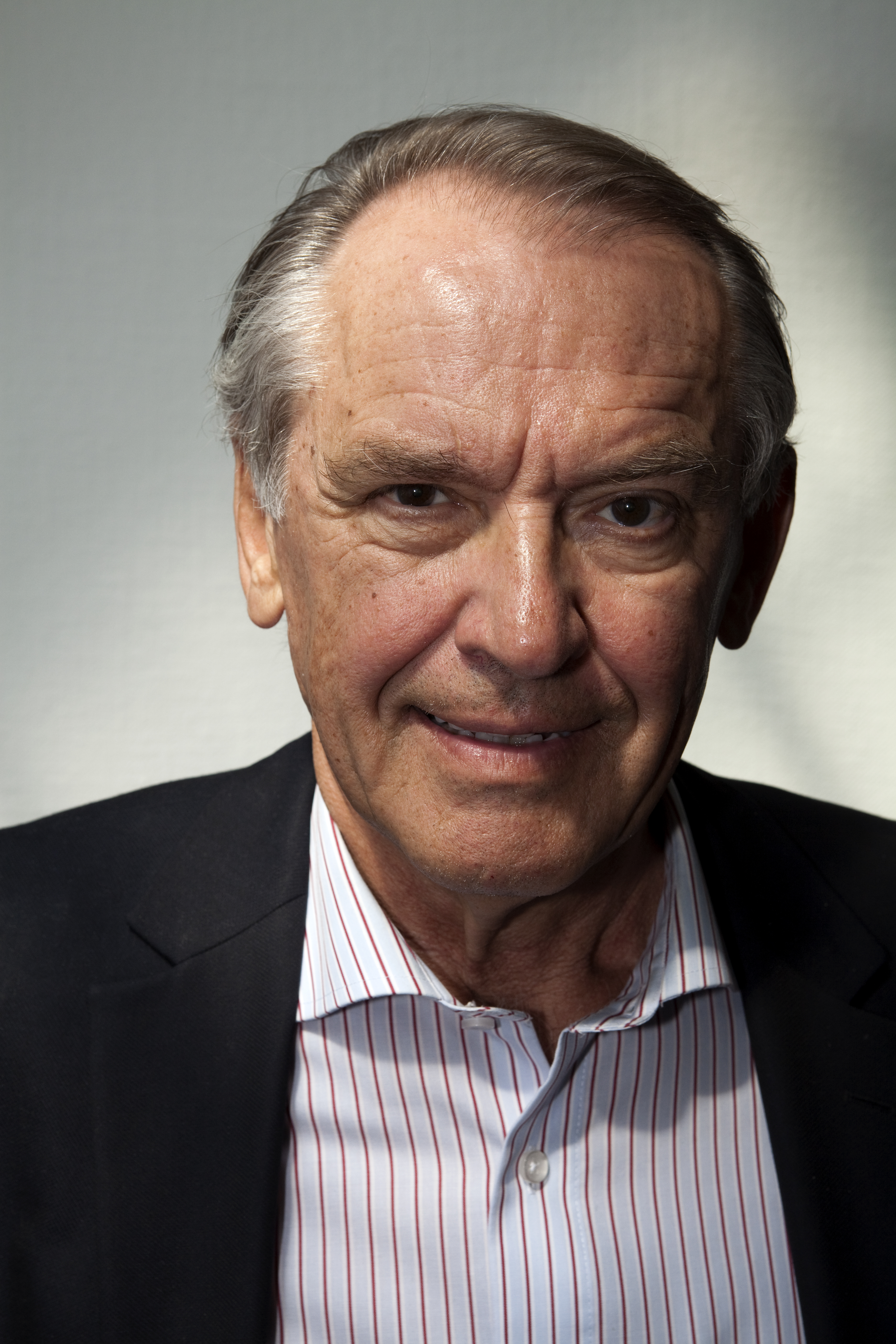
- Eliasson in 2010

4th Deputy Secretary-General of the United Nations
- In office 1 July 2012 – 31 December 2016
- Secretary-General: Ban Ki-moon
- Preceded by: Asha-Rose Migiro
- Succeeded by: Amina Mohammed

Minister for Foreign Affairs
- In office 24 April 2006 – 6 October 2006
- Prime Minister: Göran Persson
- Preceded by: Laila Freivalds
- Succeeded by: Carl Bildt

60th President of the United Nations General Assembly
- In office 13 September 2005 – 11 September 2006
- Preceded by: Jean Ping
- Succeeded by: Haya Rashed Al-Khalifa

Ambassador of Sweden to the United States
- In office 2000–2005
- Preceded by: Rolf Ekéus
- Succeeded by: Gunnar Lund

State Secretary for Foreign Affairs
- In office 1994–1999
- Preceded by: Lars-Åke Nilsson
- Succeeded by: Hans Dahlgren

1st Under Secretary-General for Humanitarian Affairs and Emergency Relief Coordinator
- In office 1992–1994
- Preceded by: Position established
- Succeeded by: Peter Hansen

Ambassador of Sweden to the United Nations
- In office 1988–1992
- Preceded by: Anders Ferm
- Succeeded by: Peter Osvald

Personal details
- Born: Jan Kenneth Eliasson; 17 September 1940 (age 86) Gothenburg, Sweden
- Party: Social Democratic
- Education: Royal Swedish Naval Academy; University of Gothenburg

Jan Kenneth Eliasson (born 17 September 1940) is a Swedish diplomat who was Deputy Secretary-General of the United Nations from July 2012 to December 2016. A member of the Swedish Social Democratic Party, Eliasson served as Minister for Foreign Affairs from 24 April to 6 October 2006. Eliasson was appointed as Governing Board Chair of the Stockholm International Peace Research Institute in April 2017 and assumed his role as of 1 June 2017.

== Early life ==
Jan Eliasson was born in a working-class family in Gothenburg in Sweden. His father John was a taxi driver, previously a metal worker at SKF, and his mother Karin was a seamstress. His father was engaged in the labor union for transport. He was an AFS exchange student in Indiana, United States, from 1957 to 1958 and was commissioned a naval officer in the reserve after training at the Royal Swedish Naval Academy in 1962. During his time in the United States, he once met John F. Kennedy. In 1965 he earned a master's degree in economics from the School of Business, Economics and Law at the University of Gothenburg where he was also a president of the local AIESEC committee. He also holds honorary degrees from American University (1994), University of Gothenburg (2001) and Uppsala University (2005).

Eliasson has authored and co-authored numerous books and articles and is a frequent lecturer on foreign policy and diplomacy. Since 1988 he has been a visiting lecturer on mediation, conflict resolution and UN reform at Uppsala University.

== Career ==
Eliasson started his diplomatic career in 1965, when he was employed at the Swedish Ministry for Foreign Affairs. From 1982 to 1983 he served as Diplomatic Advisor to the Swedish Prime Minister Olof Palme, and from 1983 to 1987 as Director General for Political Affairs in the Ministry for Foreign Affairs.

From 1980 to 1986, Eliasson was part of the U.N. mission, mediating in the Iran–Iraq War. From 1988 to 1992 he served as Sweden's Permanent Representative to the United Nations in New York, where he also served as the Secretary-General's Personal Representative on Iran/Iraq.

In 1991, Eliasson was chairman of the U.N. General Assembly's working group on emergency relief and Vice President of the U.N. Economic and Social Council (ECOSOC) from 1991 to 1992. In 1992 he was appointed as the first U.N. Under-Secretary-General for Humanitarian Affairs. He was involved in operations in Somalia, Sudan, Mozambique and the Balkans. He also took initiatives on issues such as land mines, prevention and humanitarian action.

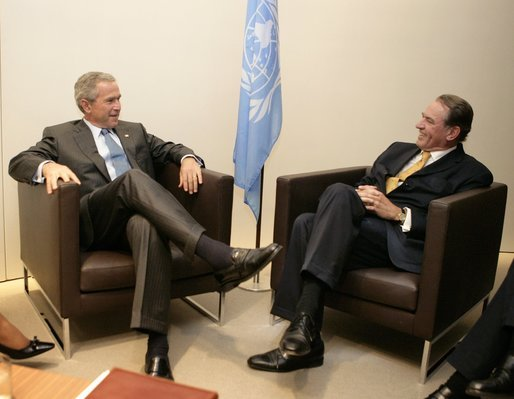
Jan Eliasson (right) meeting with George W. Bush in 2005.

In 1993–94 Eliasson served as mediator in the Nagorno-Karabakh conflict for the Organization for Security and Co-operation in Europe (OSCE).

From 1994 to 1999, Eliasson served as Swedish State Secretary for Foreign Affairs. From 2000 to 2005 he served as Sweden's Ambassador to Washington, D.C., United States. On 13 June 2005 he was unanimously elected President of the United Nations General Assembly, for its sixtieth session. He served as president from 13 September 2005 to 11 September 2006.

From 24 April 2006 to 6 October 2006 he also served as Swedish Minister of Foreign Affairs in the Social Democratic cabinet of Göran Persson. Following the 2006 Swedish general election when his party lost the election, he announced that he will teach at Uppsala University.

Humanitarian and Cultural crisis in the Middle East Jan Eliasson, 7 September 2015

Eliasson condemned the 2006 Lebanon War: "The military offensive of Israel is an extremely dangerous escalation of the situation in the region". He also condemned the attacks of Hezbollah.

In December 2006, then U.N. Secretary-General Kofi Annan announced Eliasson as Special Envoy to Darfur, Sudan. He left this mission in June 2008.

In March 2009, Eliasson gave a lecture entitled "Armed Conflict: The Cost to Civilians" at the University of San Diego's Joan B. Kroc Institute for Peace & Justice Distinguished Lecture Series.

Eliasson is an Eminent Member of the Sergio Vieira de Mello Foundation and he currently sits on the advisory board of the Alliance for Peacebuilding. Eliasson was Chair of WaterAid Sweden. Since 2010 he serves in the UN Secretary-General's Advocates Group for the achievement of the Millennium Development Goals. Eliasson is a former Board member of DARA.

On 2 March 2012, Jan Eliasson was appointed Deputy Secretary-General of the United Nations by Secretary-General Ban Ki-moon. He took office as Deputy Secretary-General on 1 July 2012.

He always carries in his pocket a print of the UN charter.

On 23 October 2017, the Tallberg Foundation announced that its Global Leadership Prize will henceforth be named after Jan Eliasson.

On 27 April 2017, the Swedish Government appointed Jan Eliasson as Chair of the SIPRI Governing Board. Eliasson has formally assumed the position as of 1 June 2017.

On 13 May 2022, Eliasson published a memoir titled Ord och Handling : ett liv i diplomatins tjänst ("Words and Action : a life in service of diplomacy").

== Personal life ==
Eliasson is married to Kerstin Eliasson, former Swedish State Secretary for Education and Science. They have three children: Anna, Emilie and Johan. He is a GAIS supporter.

== Awards and decorations ==
=== Swedish ===
- (Sweden) H. M. The King's Medal, 12th size gold (silver-gilt) medal worn around the neck on the Order of the Seraphim ribbon (2005)
- (Sweden) Illis quorum (2016)

=== Foreign ===
- (Argentina) Grand Cross of the Order of the Liberator General San Martín (18 May 1998)
- Grand Decoration of Honour in Gold with Sash for Services to the Republic of Austria (1997)
- (Portugal) Grand Cross of the Order of Prince Henry (13 January 1987)
- (Estonia) 1st Class of the Order of the White Star (8 September 1995)

Diplomatic posts
Preceded by Anders Ferm	Ambassador of Sweden to the United Nations; 1988–1992	Succeeded by Peter Osvald
Preceded by Rolf Ekéus	Ambassador of Sweden to the United States; 2000–2005	Succeeded by Gunnar Lund
Positions in intergovernmental organisations
New office	Under Secretary-General for Humanitarian Affairs and Emergency Relief Coordinator; 1992–1994	Succeeded by Peter Hansen
Preceded by Jean Ping	President of the United Nations General Assembly; 2005–2006	Succeeded by Haya Rashed Al-Khalifa
Preceded by (Tanzania) Asha-Rose Migiro	Deputy Secretary-General of the United Nations; 2012–2016	Succeeded by (Nigeria) Amina Mohammed
Government offices
Preceded by Lars-Åke Nilsson	State Secretary for Foreign Affairs; 1994–1999	Succeeded by Hans Dahlgren
Political offices
Preceded by Laila Freivalds	Minister for Foreign Affairs; 2006	Succeeded by Carl Bildt
