= Bill Ferrar =

English mathematician

- Born: 21 October 1893; Bristol, England
- Died: 22 January 1990 (aged 96); Oxford, England
- Scientific career
- Fields: Mathematics

Dr William Leonard Ferrar FRSE (21 October 1893 – 22 January 1990) was an English mathematician. He focused on interpolation theory and number theory.

== Early life ==
Ferrar was born on 21 October 1893 in St Pauls, Bristol, the son of Maria Susannah Ferrar and her husband George William Persons Ferrar, a lamplighter.

He attended Bristol Grammar School. In 1912, he gained a place at The Queen's College in Oxford, winning the Junior Mathematical Scholarship in 1914. His studies were interrupted by the First World War during which he first spent as a telephonist in the artillery then as an intelligence officer in France.

He returned to Oxford in 1919 and graduated MA in 1920, and later received a doctorate (DSc).

== Career ==
He spent his first 4 years working in Bangor then was invited to the University of Edinburgh by Edmund Whittaker as a lecturer in mathematics. There he worked with Edward Copson and Alec Aitken, and wrote papers on convergent series, interpolation theory, and number theory.

In 1925, he was elected a Fellow of the Royal Society of Edinburgh. His proposers were Edmund Whittaker, Edward Copson, Sir Charles Galton Darwin and David Gibb.

In the autumn of 1925, he took up a new role at the University of Oxford.

From its creation until 1933, he was the editor at the university of the Quarterly Journal of Mathematics in which he published many papers. In 1937, he became the bursar of Hertford College, Oxford which he was employed at for 22 years. After being the bursar in 1959, he became the Principal of the college. In 1947, he belated applied for a doctorate and received a DSc.

== Publications ==
- A Textbook of Convergence (1938)
- Algebra: a Textbook of Determinants, Matrices and Quadratic Forms (1941, 2nd ed. 1957)
- Finite Matrices (1951)
- Mathematics for Science (1965)
- Integral Calculus (1966)
- Calculus for Beginners (1967)
- Advanced Mathematics for Science (1969)
- Differential Calculus
- Higher Algebra for Schools (1945)
- Higher Algebra

== Artistic recognition ==
His portrait was painted by Ruskin Spear in 1965.

== Family ==
He was married to Edna Ferrar (1898–1986). Their son was Michael Ferrar.

== Death ==
He died in Oxford on 22 January 1990. He is buried in Wolvercote Cemetery.

Academic offices
Preceded by Neville Richard Murphy	Principal of Hertford College, Oxford; 1959–1964	Succeeded by Robert Hall
