= Tom Fletcher (diplomat) =

British diplomat (born 1975)

Tom Fletcher CMG
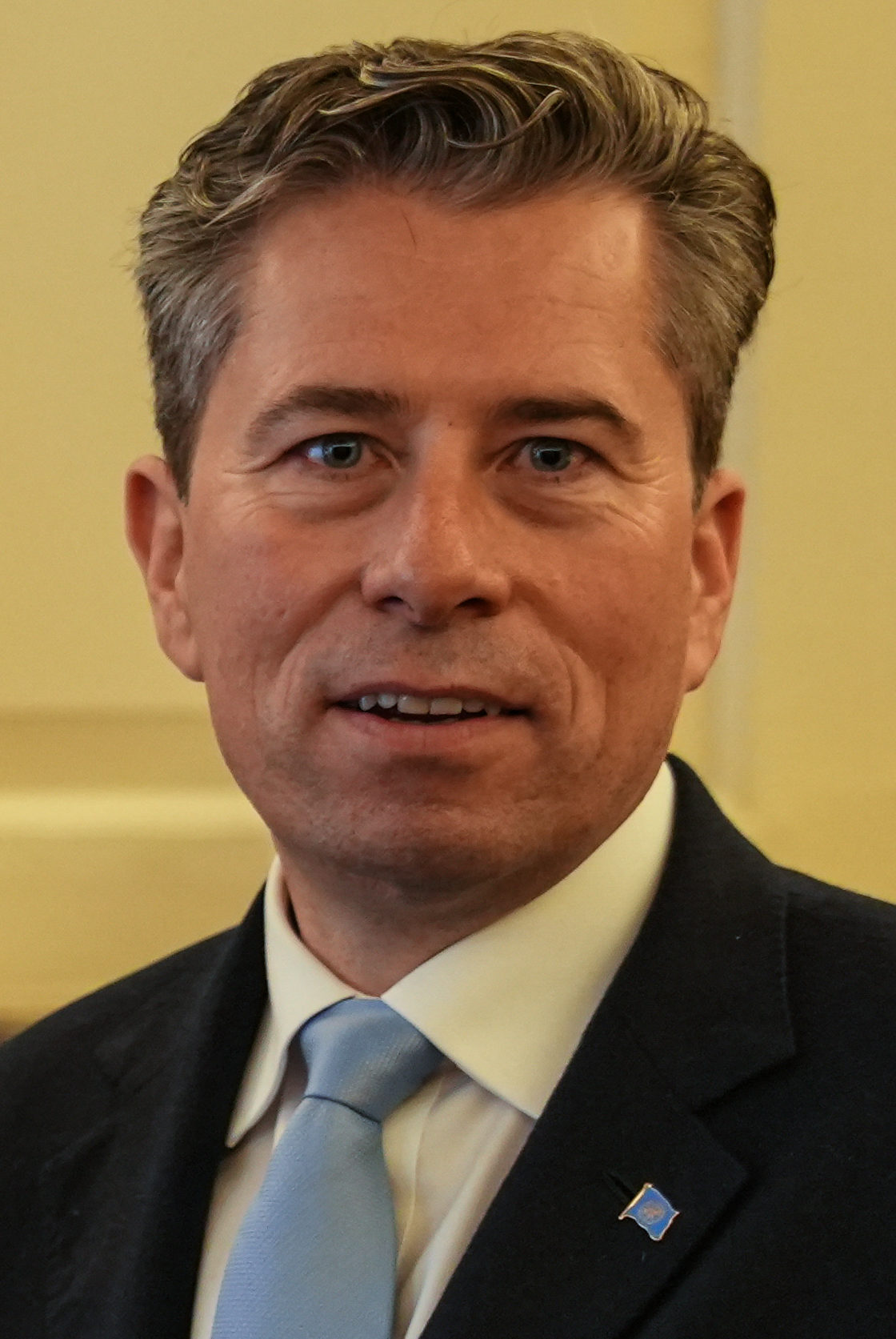
- Fletcher in 2026

United Nations 12th Under-Secretary-General for Humanitarian Affairs and Emergency Relief Coordinator
- Incumbent
- Assumed office 9 October 2024
- Appointed by: António Guterres
- Preceded by: Martin Griffiths

British Ambassador to Lebanon
- In office 2011–2015
- Preceded by: Frances Guy
- Succeeded by: Hugo Shorter

Principal of Hertford College, Oxford
- In office 2020–2024
- Preceded by: Will Hutton
- Succeeded by: Patrick Roche

Personal details
- Born: 27 March 1975 (age 51)
- Children: 2
- Education: Hertford College, Oxford (MA)

Thomas Stuart Francis Fletcher CMG (born 27 March 1975) is a British diplomat and writer who has served as the United Nations under-secretary-general for humanitarian affairs and emergency relief coordinator since 2024.

He was principal of Hertford College, Oxford, from 2020 to 2024, having previously served as British ambassador to Lebanon and a foreign affairs policy adviser at 10 Downing Street.

== Early life and education ==
Fletcher was born in Kent and educated at the Harvey Grammar School and Hertford College, Oxford.

== Diplomatic career ==
=== Early roles ===
Fletcher joined the Foreign and Commonwealth Office and held diplomatic posts in Nairobi and Paris, and is the co-founder of 2020 (a progressive think tank). He was also private secretary to the Foreign and Commonwealth Office ministers Baroness Amos and Chris Mullin. While in Kenya, he took part in a charity boxing match with the mayor of Nairobi, who had t-shirts printed saying "Fletcher goes home on a stretcher".

Between 2007 and 2011, Fletcher was a foreign policy and Northern Ireland adviser to prime ministers Tony Blair, Gordon Brown and David Cameron. In his memoirs, Brown called him "indispensable and indefatigable". In his book For the Record, Cameron wrote: "There was one man who would prove essential: Tom Fletcher. Tom became my support, sounding board and source of information about virtually every country on Earth."

=== Ambassador to Lebanon ===
From 2011 to 2015 Fletcher served as British Ambassador to Lebanon, where he tweeted and wrote blogposts (Dear Lebanon and Yalla Bye). He said: "The smartphone from which I tweet is also the device which terrorists can use to track me. For security reasons I always have to tweet from the car on the way to the next place. If I tweet from the place I am, I have to leave immediately." The BBC made a documentary, The Naked Diplomat, about his work, which involved initiatives on refugee education, job creation and border security.

In partnership with the Banque du Liban, Fletcher led the launch of the UK Lebanon Tech Hub, an international accelerator using London as a platform for Lebanese technology businesses to grow internationally. By December 2018, the hub had helped to grow 91 start-ups, raising more than $64 million in venture funding and creating more than 2,000 jobs in Lebanon and the United Kingdom.

Fletcher donated blood after a terrorist attack against the Iranian embassy in Beirut in 2013.

Arab News described him as "the anti-diplomat" because of his steadfast refusal to live up to the stereotype expected of the ambassadorial profession. He was commended by many commentators for his viral online farewell, which resurrected the old Foreign and Commonwealth Office tradition of the valedictory despatch. In December 2015 he was given the Lovie Special Achievement award for his use of social media while serving in Lebanon.

=== Principal of Hertford College, Oxford ===
Fletcher was elected Principal of Hertford College in November 2019 and took up the post in 2020. His association with Hertford spanned three decades, from his time as an undergraduate to his return as Principal. At the time of appointment, he was noted to be the youngest serving head of an Oxford college and the youngest ever Principal of Hertford.

As Principal, Fletcher linked his diplomatic background to higher education, describing education as “upstream diplomacy”. Fletcher characterised Hertford as a college shaped by “unpretentious mischief”, argument and opportunity. His tenure was associated with Hertford 2030, the college’s strategic vision around academic excellence, access, sustainability, opportunity, community and citizenship, and world-class facilities. In Hertford, Fletcher also served as Vice Chair of Oxford University’s Conference of Colleges in 2023/24. He oversaw the establishment of the Asseily Scholarship for a student displaced by conflict, persecution, or deprivation, as well as the Sibusiso Scholarship for five African graduate students.

In his farewell message, Fletcher described Hertford College as "more than a building, but a community" and "more than the portraits that tell us who we've been, we're the glass ceiling breakers of the future who will show us who we can be". During his final year, Fletcher highlighted Hertford’s access, sustainability and capital-development agenda, including plans for a new library, graduate centre, roof terrace and café. Hertford described the library project as a once-in-a-generation redevelopment intended to expand study space, improve accessibility and provide a new ‘rare books and archives’ facility.

=== UN Humanitarian Chief and Emergency Relief Coordinator ===
On 9 October 2024, United Nations Secretary-General António Guterres appointed Fletcher as Under-Secretary-General for Humanitarian Affairs and Emergency Relief Coordinator, succeeding Martin Griffiths. He took office on 18 November 2024. As Emergency Relief Coordinator, he heads the United Nations Office for the Coordination of Humanitarian Affairs (OCHA) and chairs the Inter-Agency Standing Committee (IASC), the principal humanitarian coordination forum bringing together United Nations agencies and major humanitarian organisations. He was the sixth Briton in a row to hold the role, despite efforts by some countries to have the United Nations Secretary-General, appoint someone of a different nationality.

Fletcher’s appointment coincided with a marked contraction in global funding for humanitarian response alongside rising global need. Fletcher repeatedly linked the deterioration in humanitarian response capacity to donor retrenchment and the politicisation of aid. In February 2025, he discussed the consequences of United States foreign aid cuts in an interview with Sarah Montague for the BBC World Service. In March, appearing on Talk to Al Jazeera, he warned that funding reductions, political obstruction and increasing danger for aid workers were constraining humanitarian operations amid escalating crises.

Appearing on The Rest Is Politics: Leading Podcast with Alastair Campbell and Rory Stewart, Fletcher described his job as being akin to a driver of an "ambulance towards the fire" while also being asked to extinguish it without sufficient resources and while facing attacks on humanitarian personnel. The metaphor captured his wider argument that humanitarian organisations were being asked to respond to growing wars and disasters while their resources and protection were simultaneously being eroded. In public statements, Fletcher repeatedly describes humanitarian action as operating in an increasingly hostile political environment.

In March 2025, Fletcher launched what he termed the ''Humanitarian Reset'' through the Inter-Agency Standing Committee (IASC). The initiative was presented as a response to declining resources, reduced political support for humanitarian action and pressure on humanitarian organisations. Its stated direction included stronger prioritisation of life-saving assistance, simplified coordination arrangements, greater authority at country level and efforts to direct more resources to local and national responders. In his statement announcing the initiative, he said that the humanitarian system was "underfunded, overstretched and under attack", and that humanitarian organisations would "prioritize robustly, and make the toughest choices". The latter is in reference to reduced funding which, according to the United Nations, had forced humanitarian organisations to limit whom they could assist and focus on the most vulnerable. On the question of reform of the United Nations, Fletcher also argued that reform should not be about protecting institutions: the system needed to devolve power, listen more seriously to people affected by crises and defend the principles of international solidarity on which humanitarian action depends. In Le Monde, he quipped “anyone who says the UN is dead should spend some time with my colleagues in Sudan or DRC”

The consequences of the funding contraction were immediate. In April 2025, Fletcher announced that his own office (OCHA) would reduce its workforce by approximately 20 per cent. The Humanitarian Reset agenda also generated criticism from organisations outside the United Nations. The New Humanitarian reported that representatives of local and national organisations considered consultation inadequate and said they lacked meaningful participation in decisions affecting the future architecture of humanitarian response.

By December 2025, the funding contraction had forced a substantially narrower appeal. Fletcher had launched a prioritised 2026 global humanitarian appeal seeking US$23 billion to assist 87 million whose lives were considered at greatest risk, although around 250 million people were assessed as requiring urgent assistance. It represented the scale of the choices imposed by falling funding. Fletcher subsequently launched the “87 Million Lives” campaign in support of the appeal. The Stimson Center later described the campaign as an example of how OCHA’s fundraising efforts could contribute to a more visible, dynamic and effective United Nations.

With time, the relationship with the United States subsequently became more complex than a simple story of withdrawal. On 29 December 2025, the United States announced a US$2 billion contribution to OCHA-managed humanitarian funds under an arrangement associated with the Humanitarian Reset. On 14 May 2026, it announced a further US$1.8 billion for humanitarian pooled funds and prioritised life-saving assistance, bringing total United States support under this arrangement to US$3.8 billion across 21 countries and the Central Emergency Response Fund. The contribution announcements were significant, however, they came amid broader United States reductions in foreign assistance. The Associated Press reported that the US$3.8 billion remained a fraction of historical United States humanitarian contributions and that wider cuts had already led humanitarian organisations to reduce projects, spending and staffing.

Gaza became a prominent feature of Fletcher’s public advocacy. He repeatedly called for unrestricted humanitarian access and criticised Israeli restrictions on aid delivery. In May 2025, he rejected an Israel-initiated and United States-backed alternative aid distribution mechanism, arguing before the Security Council that it would displace people further and subordinate humanitarian assistance to political and military objectives. Israel and the United States said alternative arrangements were needed to prevent Hamas from diverting aid.

Following the ceasefire announcement in October 2025, Fletcher visited Gaza and discussed the expansion of humanitarian assistance in an interview with Nick Robinson for BBC Radio 4’s Political Thinking. He described travelling through Gaza as resembling a journey through the ruins of Hiroshima, Stalingrad or Dresden, and discussed United Nations efforts to scale up aid, his dealings with the administration of United States President Donald Trump and the ceasefire negotiations at Sharm el-Sheikh. In an interview with 'The Observer', Fletcher described his principal responsibility as "bearing witness" to suffering in humanitarian crises. Referring to Gaza, he said that although the ceasefire had allowed expanded food assistance, immunisation and sanitation work, living conditions remained severe and reconstruction requirements were extensive. He also said that United Nations staff in Gaza were using GPS to identify the locations of their homes because surrounding landmarks had been destroyed.

Fletcher has also linked humanitarian action to wider questions of technology and international politics. Delivering a speech at Sciences Po in 2026, entitled ''Moral Ambition in a Driverless World'', he questioned whether artificial intelligence would be governed by humanitarian values and argued that humanitarian action required renewed international solidarity at a time when civilians, humanitarian personnel and multilateral institutions were under pressure. He also raised concerns about whether artificial intelligence systems would be governed by humanitarian ethics, and presented human solidarity as a necessary response to technological and political fragmentation.

Reflecting on his role, Fletcher has rejected portrayals of his role as uniquely difficult in comparison with the experiences of people affected by crises. In his interview with Nick Robinson, he was introduced in terms of having one of the most difficult jobs in the world. He said that the harder experience was that of a father in Gaza trying to put food on the table, a mother in Kunduz who lost her child after travelling for hours to reach a clinic, or women in Haiti facing repeated gang sexual violence. Compared with them, he said, his own job was “pretty easy”. He has also spoken about the personal toll of witnessing suffering and humanitarian crises. In an interview with Mehdi Hasan for Zeteo, Fletcher said that he had started therapy to process his experience of witnessing death and trauma.

Fletcher has also warned of what he described as a collapse in protection for aid workers. Speaking at the International Conference on the Protection of Humanitarian Aid Workers in Brussels in October 2026, he cited more than 1,000 aid workers killed over the preceding three years. He criticised the lack of meaningful investigations into their deaths and argued that responsibility extended beyond those carrying out attacks to those ordering them, supplying weapons or organising cover-ups. He said those involved should feel “fear, shame, guilt”. He urged states to use their diplomatic, political and economic influence to uphold international humanitarian law and to hold allies, opponents and themselves to the same standards. Calling for independent investigations, equal protection for local and international humanitarian staff, and funding to cover the full cost of delivering aid safely, he said there was “no delivering aid without defending those who deliver it”.

== Other work ==
=== Writing and broadcasting ===
Fletcher is the author of four books: The Naked Diplomat: Power and Politics in the Digital Age (HarperCollins, 2016), Ten Survival Skills for a World in Flux (HarperCollins, 2022), and two political thrillers, The Ambassador (Canelo, 2022) and The Assassin (Canelo, 2024).

Fletcher's first book, The Naked Diplomat: Power and Statecraft in the Digital Age, was published by Harper Collins in 2016. It examines how digital technology is changing power, politics and diplomacy. Gordon Brown called it "diplomatic genius", and David Cameron wrote that it was "a great read from a brilliant diplomat". The Times called it "a brilliant, funny polemic ... a cracking read", and The Guardian called it "a call for us all to reconsider our place in society ... to be brave, creative, involved and connected".

Ten Survival Skills for a World in Flux describes how people and societies can adapt to overlapping crises, including climate change, migration, new warfare, big technology and pandemics.

The Ambassador, the first book in his Diplomat Thrillers series, is novel as centred on “a global conspiracy” and “a man on the run”. The sequel, The Assassin, is an espionage thriller involving the kidnapping of a diplomat’s daughter, a regional security crisis and a series of assassinations with implications for international diplomacy and climate negotiations.

Fletcher also led reviews of the modernisation of the Foreign and Commonwealth Office (2016), the future of the United Nations in the digital age and the future of learning (2019). He wrote for the New York Times, Prospect, Foreign Policy, The National and others, was a regular interviewee on BBC, Sky, CNN and has been profiled by the BBC, Arab News and more. In 2023 he presented a BBC series entitled The Battle for Liberal Democracy.

=== Academic and other roles ===
Fletcher was a visiting professor of International Relations at New York University Abu Dhabi.He became an Honorary Fellow of Hertford College, and from 2020 to 2024 served as Principal of the college.

Fletcher is the project director of Towards Global Learning Goals, a network that aims to create equal opportunities, develop the skills needed to thrive in a new economy, and make it easier for people on the move to adapt.

He chaired the international board of the Creative Industries Federation, and was a founding member of the Global Tech Panel. In 2018 he founded the Foundation for Opportunity to share ideas, skills and experience and support future leaders in delivering positive change.

== Personal life ==
He is married to Louise Fletcher, an Irish counselling psychologist, with whom he has two sons. He collected a book of advice for his sons from world leaders, including American presidents Barack Obama, George W. Bush, and Bill Clinton, while working for 10 Downing Street.

Diplomatic posts
Preceded by Matthew Gould	Private Secretary for Foreign Affairs to the Prime Minister; 2007–2011	Succeeded by John Casson
Preceded by Frances Guy	Ambassador to the Republic of Lebanon; 2011–2015	Succeeded by Hugo Shorter
Academic offices
Preceded by Will Hutton	Principal of Hertford College, Oxford; 2020–	Incumbent
Positions in intergovernmental organisations
Preceded by Martin Griffiths ( (United Kingdom) )	Under Secretary General for Humanitarian Affairs and Emergency Relief Coordinator; 2024–present	Succeeded by Incumbent
