= Take-note debate =

Type of debate in some parliaments

A take-note debate is a type of debate that allows members of a parliament to debate a matter of public policy, without making any decision. When the members of the house have concluded the debate, the house moves on to other business, without a vote being taken. It is found in some parliaments based on the Westminster parliamentary system.

The name comes from the first line of the motion initiating the debate: "That this House takes note of ...", followed by the issue to be discussed. The purpose of a take-note debate is to allow the members of parliament to express their opinions on the issue, and for the members of the cabinet to assess the views of the house. A government may institute a take-note debate to assist it in deciding on a course of action with respect to the issue under consideration, prior to introducing government policy measures or legislation.

Take-note debates are formally provided for in the rules of the British House of Lords and the Canadian House of Commons. The British House of Commons also has a procedural mechanism for take-note debates, although not under that name.

== Purpose ==
In the Westminster system, the prime minister and cabinet generally control the legislative agenda, and votes in parliament are normally subject to party discipline. Although this approach ensures that legislation and government policy will be enacted, it can have the effect of restricting the ability of government backbenchers and the members of the opposition to influence government policy.

The take-note debate has evolved as a way to allow members of parliament to express their opinions on matters of public importance, prior to the cabinet making a decision on how to approach the issue. The name comes from the first line of the motion initiating the debate: "That this House takes note of ...", followed by the issue to be discussed. The take-note debate is generally not subject to party discipline.

Another feature of a take-note debate is that no vote is taken at the end of the debate. As well, within the time limits, members may speak as many times as they wish, unlike some other types of parliamentary debates, where a member can only speak once. This relaxation of normal rules is designed to ensure a broad debate on the issue, and one that is not subject to party discipline, since no vote is taken.

One committee of the Canadian House of Commons explained the purpose of the take-note debate, stating that this type of debate will "... allow members to participate in the development of government policy, making their views known before the government makes a decision; they allow the government to canvass the views of members."

== Canada ==
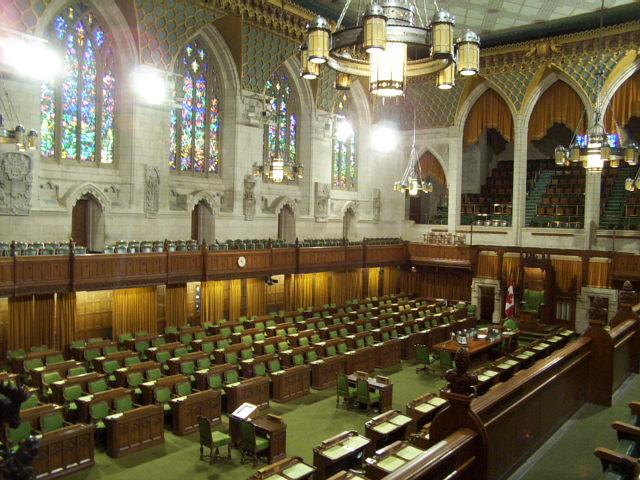
Chamber of the House of Commons of Canada

In Canada, the first take-note debates were held in the federal House of Commons in the early 1990s on a trial basis, as "special debates". Prior to the introduction of take-note debates, the rules of the House of Commons allowed for emergency debates, which were similar in nature, but could only be held if the Speaker concluded that certain conditions were met.

Take-note debates were formally added to the standing orders of the House of Commons in 1993 and are more flexible than the rules for emergency debates. The first take-note debate under the new rules was on the use of Canadian peace-keepers in Bosnia. Prime Minister Chrétien commented on the purpose of the new approach:

As I was saying in this House, yesterday, we are trying out an entirely new political process. In the past, members were always asked to comment after the fact which meant, for someone in the opposition, to oppose a decision, once it was already too late to have a real influence on the government's decision. This procedure is without precedent. I hope members will try their very best to make it efficient in order to allow the expression of views, after which the government will decide. It has been said, by some, that no vote will be taking place in this kind of debate. Since its purpose is to make views known to government before a decision is taken, it is quite naturally so.

— Jean Chrétien, House of Commons Debates, January 25, 1994, p. 261

The leaders of the other parties also commented on their satisfaction with the new approach.

A take-note debate is initiated by a minister, after consultation with the opposition parties. The debate is held 48 hours after being placed on the order paper. The debate occurs at the end of the normal adjournment for the day. The House moves into Committee of the Whole, but unusually for committee, with the Speaker in the chair. Each member can speak for 10 minutes, and has an additional 10 minutes to respond to questions. Members can share their time. The debate lasts for either four hours, or until no member stands to speak. The House then adjourns.

Take-note debates have been held in the House of Commons on a variety of issues: cruise-missile testing, peacekeeping missions, Canada's role in Afghanistan, reactions to natural disasters, and issues facing Canadian industries. One 2021 debate concerned the discovery of over 200 unmarked graves at Kamloops Indian Residential School.

== United Kingdom ==
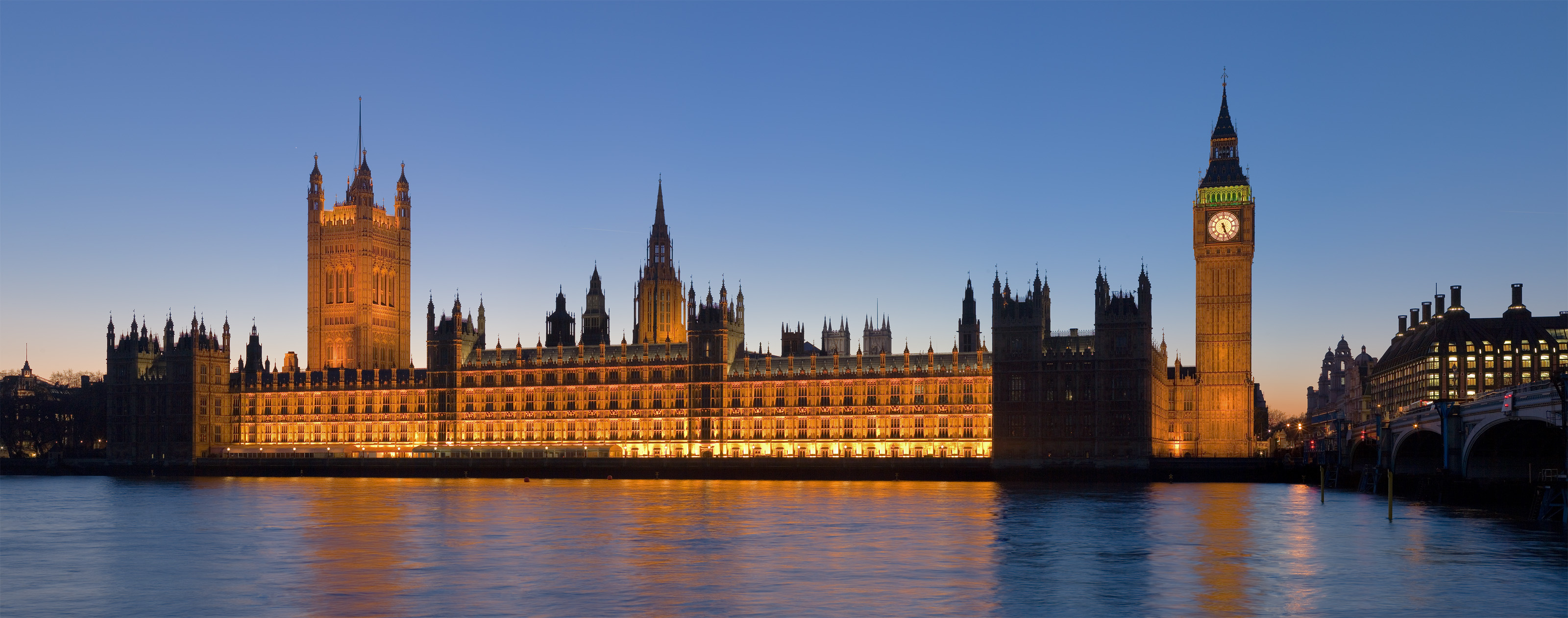
Palace of Westminster, the meeting place of the British Parliament

The House of Lords provides for debates "to take note" of a particular issue, without coming to a decision. The motion for the debate can be on any subject, but the phrasing of the motion itself must be neutral in terms.

The House of Commons has a similar procedure, created in 2007, where a member can move that "This House has considered the matter of ..." The motion results in a general debate, but does not require any decision from the House.

== See also ==
- Adjournment debate
