= Joseph Browne (provost) =

English clergyman and academic

Joseph Browne (1700–1767) was an English clergyman and academic, Provost of The Queen's College, Oxford, from 1756.

== Life ==
Browne was the son of George Browne, and was born at a place called the Tongue in Watermillock, Cumberland, England. He was educated at Barton school, and admitted commoner of Queen's College, Oxford, on 21 March 1717, his education being supported by a private benefactor. He was elected tabarder on the foundation of his college, and, having graduated M.A. on 4 November 1724, became a chaplain there. In 1726 he published an edition of the Latin poems of Maffeo Barberini, later Pope Urban VIII.

Joseph Browne was elected Fellow 1 April 1731, and became a successful tutor; took the degree of D.D. 9 July 1743, and was presented by the college with the living of Bramshot, Hampshire, in 1746. In that year, he was appointed Sedleian Professor of Natural Philosophy and held that office until his death. He was instituted prebendary of Hereford Cathedral on 9 June of the same year (he was later called into residence), and on 13 February 1752 was collated to the chancellorship of the cathedral.

On 3 December 1756, Browne was elected Provost of Queen's College. From 1759 to 1765 he held the office of Vice-Chancellor of Oxford University. He had a severe stroke of palsy 25 March 1765, and died on 17 June 1767.

== Works ==
He edited Maphaei S. R. E. Card. Barberini postea Urbani PP. VIII. Poemata, Oxonii, E Typographeo Clarendoniano, MDCCXXVI. [1726] (https://books.google.com/books?id=7KBWAAAAcAAJ/)

== Sources ==
- "Browne, Joseph (1700-1767)" . Dictionary of National Biography. London: Smith, Elder & Co. 1885–1900.

Academic offices
Preceded by Joseph Smith	Provost of The Queen's College, Oxford; 1756–67	Succeeded by Thomas Fothergill
Preceded by Thomas Randolph	Vice-Chancellor of Oxford University; 1759–65	Succeeded by David Durell
