= Patrick Roche (astronomer) =

British scientist (born 1954)

Principal of Hertford College, Oxford
- In office 18 November 2024 – 16 March 2026
- Preceded by: Tom Fletcher
- Succeeded by: Alexandra Freeman

Personal details
- Born: Patrick Roche; October 1954 (age 71–72)
- Education: University College London (BSc, PhD)
- Scientific career
- Workplaces: University of Oxford
- Doctoral advisor: David Aitken

Patrick Roche (born October 1954) is a British astronomer. His research interests are interstellar matter, cosmic dust, and infrared. He served as interim principal of Hertford College, Oxford, between 2024 and 2026.

== Biography ==
=== Astronomy ===
In March 2000, alongside Philip Lucas of the University of Hertfordshire, Roche discovered 13 "free-floating planets" in a sensitive survey of a region in the Orion Nebula. The floating planets ranged in size up to 13 Jupiters. The data was collected on a Hawaiian mountain-top. Roche told the BBC: "These are just clumps of material that coalesce and then slowly fade away ... They seem to be just floating out there in space. So they are more like failed stars than the planets of our own Solar System which formed out of the debris left over from the creation of the Sun." Roche and Lucas also discovered more than 100 brown dwarfs. The discovery provoked wide scientific controversy, with some experts arguing that the planets were actually regular stars far behind Orion. However, the results were strengthened by theoretical work on the atmospheres by France Allard and Isabelle Baraffe of the École normale supérieure de Lyon and by Peter Hauschildt at the University of Georgia. Lucas, Roche, Allard and Hauschildt also analysed 20 of the brown dwarfs and planet candidates in the Orion Nebula to confirm the result. In April 2001, Roche and Lucas confirmed their findings at the National Astronomy Meeting in Cambridge, citing the figure of up to 20 "free-floating planets" in the region.

In February 2011, Roche submitted evidence to the Science and Technology Committee of the House of Commons regarding ground-based optical infrared astronomy on behalf of Oxford Astrophysics, a sub-department of Physics at Oxford University.

In February 2018, Roche led a team of astronomers which revealed their creation of a new high resolution map of the magnetic field lines in gas and dust swirling around the supermassive black hole (Sagittarius A*) at the centre of the Milky Way. The map was the first of its kind and was made using the CanariCam infrared camera attached to the Gran Telescopio Canarias sited on the island of La Palma. Referring to the camera, Roche said: "Combined with the light grasp and the quality of the images produced by the Gran Telescopio Canarias, it is revealing details of magnetic fields and cosmic dust properties in a range of astronomical objects." He added: "Big telescopes like GTC, and instruments like CanariCam, deliver real results. We're now able to watch material race around a black hole 25,000 light years away, and for the first time see magnetic fields there in detail."

In Autumn 2020, Roche became one of ten committee members for the newly-established European Astronomical Society (EAS) Advisory Committee on Sustainability.

=== Hertford College ===
Roche served as Tutorial Fellow in Physics at Hertford between 1995–2023, also variously serving as Tutor for Graduates, Investment Bursar, and Senior Member of the Boat Club. After retirement, he stayed on to advise on the college's Estates Strategy.

After Tom Fletcher's appointment as the United Nations' Under-Secretary-General for Humanitarian Affairs and Emergency Relief Coordinator, Hertford's governing body stated that they had elected Roche as interim principal on 6 November 2024. He took up the post on 18 November. His reign saw building work for the college's new library, which Roche described in September 2025 as Hertford's "largest transformation in a century." On 12 November 2025, Hertford announced that Alexandra Freeman had been elected the college's next principal. Senior Fellow Steve New commented: "We consider ourselves lucky to have had Professor Pat Roche as our Interim Principal; the College is grateful to him for stepping in at short notice and doing such a wonderful job over the last year." Roche ceded the position on 16 March 2026, and Freeman formally became principal on 17 March.
