= Bernard Hodgson =

Bernard Hodgson (b 5 November Westminster 1743 – d Oxford 28 May 1805) was an Oxford college head.

Hodgson was educated at Westminster School and Christ Church, Oxford. On 30 October 1775 he became Principal of Hertford College, Oxford. A Hebraist and poet, he translated Song of Solomon (1786, The Proverbs of Solomon (1788) and Ecclesiastes: a New Translation from the Original Hebrew (1790); and "The Monastery: a Poem on the Building of a Monastery in Dorsetshire" (1795).
