= Robert Hall, Baron Roberthall =

Australian-born economist

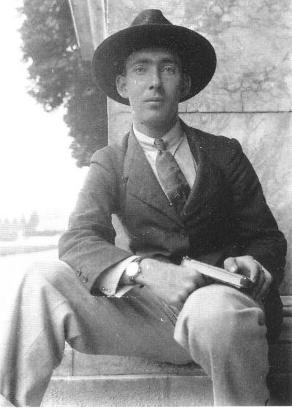
Robert Hall in Versailles while a Rhodes scholar

Robert Lowe Hall, Baron Roberthall KCMG CB (6 March 1901 – 17 September 1988) was an Australian-born economist who served as chief economic advisor to the British government from 1947 to 1961.

== Life ==
Robert Hall was born in Tenterfield, New South Wales, Australia, in 1901. His father, Edgar Hall, was an English mining engineer. while his mother, Rose Helen, was a first-generation Australian, whose father, A. K. Cullen, was Scottish. He was brought up in Queensland, where he attended Ipswich State High School. He obtained a degree in engineering at the University of Queensland, before becoming a Rhodes scholar at the University of Oxford in 1923. Having obtained a first class degree in Modern Greats in 1926, he was appointed to an economics lectureship at Trinity College, Oxford (1926–47). He was a fellow from 1927 to 1950 and an honorary fellow from 1958. In 1927 he was junior dean. He was a fellow of Nuffield College, Oxford 1938–47 and a visiting fellow, 1961–64.

During the Second World War he worked in the Ministry of Supply in Washington, D.C., and on the Board of Trade. In 1947, he succeeded James Meade as the Director of the Economic Section of the Cabinet Office of the British government; from 1953 until 1961 he was chief economic advisor to successive Chancellors of the Exchequer.

Hall was appointed a Companion of the Order of the Bath (CB) in the 1950 New Year Honours, he was appointed a Knight Commander of the Order of St Michael and St George (KCMG) in the 1954 New Year Honours. Following the announcement in June 1969 that he was to be made a life peer, Hall changed his name by Deed Poll to Roberthall on 25 September 1969 and was created Baron Roberthall, of Silverspur in the State of Queensland and Commonwealth of Australia, and of Trenance, in the County of Cornwall on 28 October 1969. In the 1970s and 1980s he served actively in the House of Lords, latterly as a member of the Social Democratic Party. In 1981 he attracted attention as one of the 364 economists-signers of a letter to The Times who questioned Margaret Thatcher's economic policy, warning that it would only result in deepening the prevailing depression. He was president of the Royal Economic Society from 1958 to 1960. He was invited to give the Rede lecture (on "Planning") in 1962.

Hall retired shortly after Selwyn Lloyd's first budget in 1961. He was politically on the Left but thought Conservative governments managed the economy better. He favoured Keynesian deficit finance, but had grown increasingly worried about inflation. He had opposed ROBOT (the plan to float the pound in the early 1950s), but with the disappearance of the dollar shortage came to favour floating after all, although he never argued for it very strongly. He wanted an incomes policy, and came to feel that unemployment was too low and that British workers and managers were not efficient enough.

He was principal of Hertford College, Oxford, from 1964 to 1967.

In 1932 he married Laura Margaret, daughter of G. E. Linfoot, an Oxford graduate and later a fellow of Somerville College, Oxford; there were two daughters, Felicity and Anthea, to the marriage, which was dissolved in 1968. In the same year Hall married Perilla Thyme Nowell-Smith, a divorcee and daughter of Sir Richard Southwell, FRS, who survived him.

== Publications ==
- Planning, The Rede Lecture 1962, Cambridge : Cambridge University Press, 32 pp.

== Quotes ==
'If intuition were given the "scientific" name of "non-statistical inference", no-one would look down his nose at it.' (Quoted in John Brunner, 'The New Idolatry', Rebirth of Britain : a symposium of essays by eighteen writers, London : Pan, 1964, pg.38.)

== Notes ==
Academic offices
| Preceded by William Leonard Ferrar | Principal of Hertford College, Oxford; 1964–1967 | Succeeded by George Lindor Brown |
