= C. R. M. F. Cruttwell =

British historian (1887–1941)

C. R. M. F. Cruttwell JP
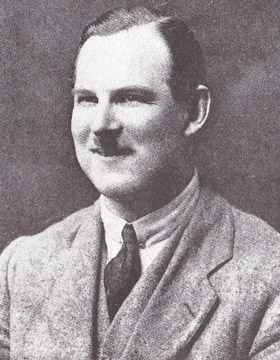
- Born: Charles Robert Mowbray Fraser Cruttwell; 23 May 1887; Denton, Norfolk, England
- Died: 14 March 1941 (aged 53); Stapleton, Bristol, England
- Education: The Queen's College, Oxford
- Occupations: Academic historian; college principal
- Father: Charles Thomas Cruttwell

Charles Robert Mowbray Fraser Cruttwell JP (23 May 1887 – 14 March 1941) was a British historian and academic who served as dean and later principal of Hertford College, Oxford. His field of expertise was modern European history, his most notable work being A History of the Great War, 1914–18. He is mainly remembered, however, for the vendetta pursued against him by the novelist Evelyn Waugh, in which Waugh showed his distaste for his former tutor by repeatedly using the name "Cruttwell" in his early novels and stories to depict a sequence of unsavoury or ridiculous characters. The prolonged minor humiliation thus inflicted may have contributed to Cruttwell's eventual mental breakdown.

Cruttwell gained first-class honours at The Queen's College, Oxford, and was elected a Fellow of All Souls College, Oxford, in 1911, and he became a lecturer in history at Hertford College the following year. His academic career was interrupted by service in the First World War during which he suffered severe wounds; he returned to Oxford in 1919 and became dean of Hertford, and then principal of the college in 1930. It was during his tenure as dean that the feud with Evelyn Waugh developed while Waugh was a history scholar at Hertford in 1922–1924. Waugh pursued this hostility until shortly before Cruttwell's death.

Cruttwell's term as Hertford's principal saw the production of his most important scholarly works, including his war history which earned him the degree of DLitt. Beyond his college and academic duties Cruttwell held various administrative offices within the university, and was a member of its Hebdomadal Council, or ruling body. In private life Cruttwell served as a Justice of the Peace in Hampshire, where he had a country home, and stood unsuccessfully for the university's parliamentary seat in the 1935 general election, representing the Conservative Party. Ill-health, aggravated by his war injuries, caused his retirement from the Hertford principalship in 1939. A mental collapse led to his committal to an institution, where he died two years later.

== Early life and career ==
=== Family background, childhood and education ===
Cruttwell was born on 23 May 1887, in the village of Denton, Norfolk, the eldest of three sons of the Rev. Charles Thomas Cruttwell, Rector of St Mary's Church. The elder Cruttwell was a scholar and historian of Roman literature; his wife Annie (née Mowbray), was the daughter of Sir John Mowbray, who served as Conservative member of parliament for Durham from 1853 to 1868 and for one of the two Oxford University parliamentary seats from 1868 to 1899. The young Cruttwell was educated at Rugby School, where in 1906 he won a scholarship to The Queen's College, Oxford, to read classics and history. At Queen's, Cruttwell enjoyed considerable academic success, including a first class honours degree in modern history. In 1911 he was elected to a fellowship at All Souls College and a year later was appointed to a history lectureship at Hertford College.

=== First World War ===
On the outbreak of the First World War in August 1914, Cruttwell was commissioned as a second lieutenant in the 1/4th Battalion, Royal Berkshire Regiment, a Territorial Force unit in which his brother was also serving. By 1915 he was serving in the trenches, in France and Flanders, and led numerous patrols into no man's land, receiving a severe leg wound. Early in 1916, persistent myalgia and rheumatism led to him being declared unfit for further active service. In August 1917 he was an instructor with an Officer Training Battalion in Oxford, and late in the war joined the Intelligence Department at the War Office. Demobilised in 1919, he resumed his academic life in Oxford, and in 1922 published a short history of his regiment's wartime exploits.

Apart from its physical effects, Cruttwell's wartime experience seemingly inflicted permanent psychological damage on his personality, replacing the general good manners of his youth with a short-tempered, impatient and bullying character. The novelist Evelyn Waugh, an undergraduate at Hertford in the 1920s, wrote later that "It was as though he had never cleansed himself from the muck of the trenches".

== Hertford College ==
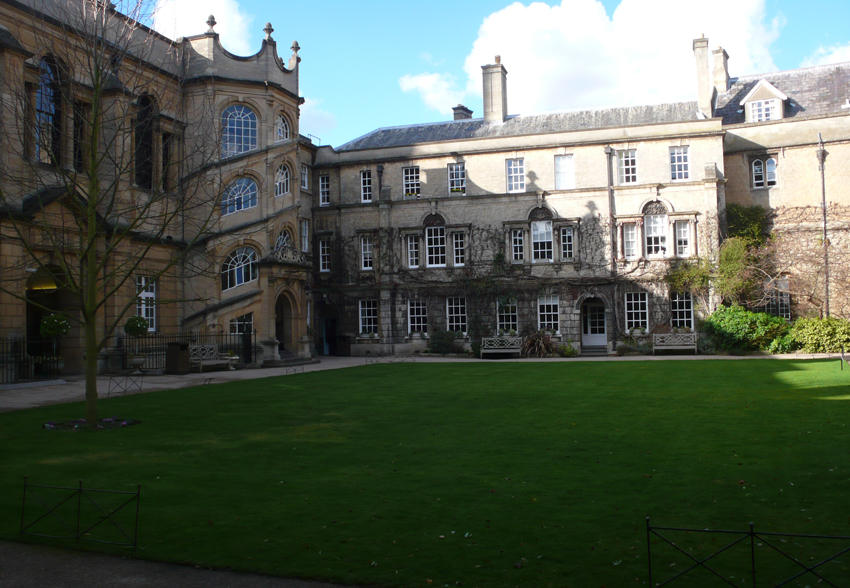
Hertford College, Oxford

On his return to Hertford College, Cruttwell was elected to a fellowship in modern history and a year later was appointed Hertford's dean, responsible for general discipline within the college; he held this post for five years. He also became active in the administration of Oxford University and was elected to its ruling body, the Hebdomadal Council. He served as a university statutory commissioner and was one of several academics nominated by the Vice-Chancellor as delegates to the Oxford University Press.

Cruttwell's administrative competence was recognised in 1930, when he was elected principal of Hertford College. In this office, he helped to establish the university's geography school and arranged that the first Oxford professorship in geography was based at Hertford. During his tenure as principal, he completed his most significant academic works, including his Great War history (1934) which earned him the Oxford degree of DLitt. In 1936 Cruttwell delivered the Lees Knowles Lecture at Trinity College, Cambridge, under the title "The Role of British Strategy in the Great War". In the same year he published a biography of the Duke of Wellington and in 1937 produced his final major academic work, A History of Peaceful Change in the Modern World. An attempt in 1935 to emulate his grandfather and become one of the university's members of parliament failed when, as a Conservative candidate in the general election of 1935, Cruttwell was defeated. An Independent, A. P. Herbert, beat him on the third ballot in a single transferable vote system. This was the first time since the 1860s, that a Conservative had failed to hold either of the two university seats, a humiliation noted with relish by Waugh who harboured a deep hostility towards his former tutor. According to The Times, Cruttwell had underestimated the nature and determination of the opposition and had taken his election as a Conservative for granted. In first preferences, he came bottom of the poll with only 1,803 votes, while his Conservative running mate, Lord Hugh Cecil, gained 7,365, almost five times as many. Because he polled less than one-eighth of the first ballot votes, Cruttwell forfeited his deposit.

== Feud with Evelyn Waugh ==
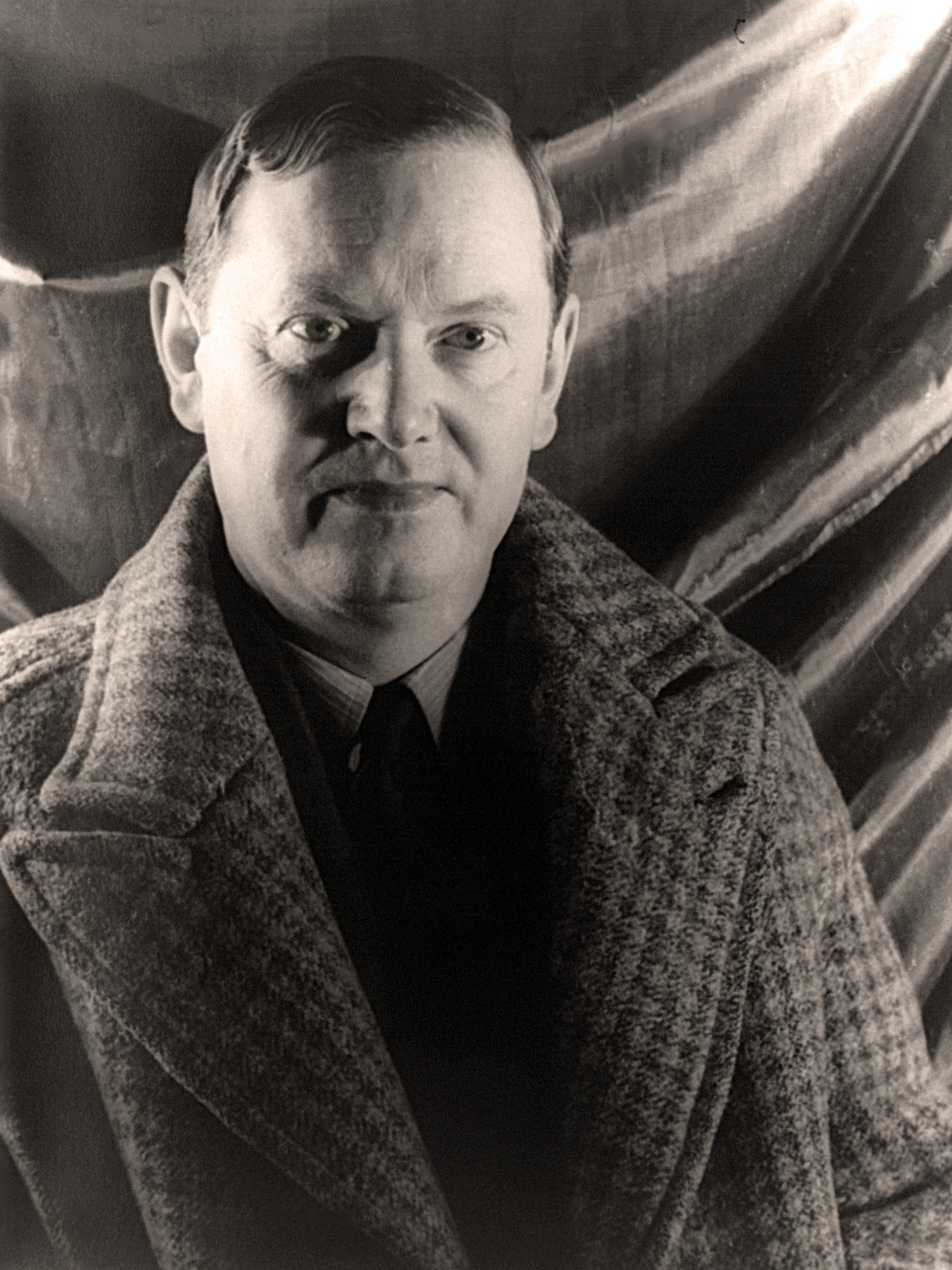
Evelyn Waugh circa 1940. Waugh continued to mock Cruttwell in his fiction until 1939, shortly before Cruttwell's final illness and death.

Evelyn Waugh joined Hertford College on a scholarship in January 1922. He had received a congratulatory letter from Cruttwell welcoming him to the college and complimenting him on his English prose: "about the best of any of the Candidates in the group". Despite this warmth, Waugh's initial impressions of his tutor were unfavourable—"not at all the kind of don for whom I had been prepared by stories of Jowett." The main basis for the rift that rapidly developed between them was Waugh's increasingly casual attitude towards his scholarship. Cruttwell saw the scholarship as a commitment to hard and devoted study. Waugh, however, considered the scholarship a reward for his successful school studies and a passport to a life of pleasure. He involved himself in a range of university activities to the detriment of his academic work, until Cruttwell brusquely advised him in his third term that he should take his studies more seriously—a warning which Waugh interpreted as an insult. "I think it was from then on that our mutual dislike became incurable", he wrote.

During his remaining time at Hertford, Waugh missed few opportunities to ridicule Cruttwell. He did this in numerous unsigned contributions to Isis, including an article in March 1924 in the "Isis Idols" series. The mockery in this article was disguised as a paean of praise, according to Waugh's biographer Martin Stannard, arranged around an unflattering photograph of Cruttwell displaying "bad teeth within an unfortunate smile". Cruttwell made no apparent response to these provocations, other than a dismissive reference to Waugh as "a silly suburban sod with an inferiority complex".

Waugh left Hertford in the summer of 1924 without completing his degree, and he received a brief note from Cruttwell expressing disappointment with his performance. The pair never met again, but Cruttwell spoke disparagingly of Waugh a few years later to Waugh's prospective mother-in-law Lady Burghclere, describing him as vice-ridden and "living off vodka and absinthe". Once Waugh had established himself as a writer, he resumed the vendetta against his former tutor by introducing a succession of disreputable or absurd characters named Cruttwell into his novels and stories. In Decline and Fall (1928), Toby Cruttwell is a psychopathic burglar; in Vile Bodies (1930), the name belongs to a snobbish Conservative MP. In Black Mischief (1932), Cruttwell is a social parasite, and he becomes a dubious osteopath or "bone-setter" in A Handful of Dust (1934). In Scoop (1938), General Cruttwell is a salesman with a fake tropical tan at the Army and Navy Stores. The 1935 short story "Mr Loveday's Little Outing" recounts the grisly deeds of an escaped homicidal maniac, and it was originally published as "Mr Cruttwell's Little Outing". The final Cruttwell reference in Waugh's fiction came in 1939 in the short story "An Englishman's Home" in the form of an embezzling Wolf Cub master. A survey was conducted in 1935 in which novelists were asked to nominate their best work, and Waugh responded that he had yet to write his masterpiece: "It is the memorial biography of C. R. M. F. Cruttwell, some time Dean of Hertford College, Oxford, and my old history tutor. It is a labour of love to one to whom, under God, I owe everything". Cruttwell made no public response, although he anticipated each new Waugh novel with much anxiety about how he might be portrayed, according to Stannard.

== Later years ==
Cruttwell remained a bachelor his whole life. His one proposal of marriage was to socialite and New York society hostess Anne Huth-Jackson, but it was rebuffed and there are no accounts of other romantic attachments. Beyond his academic duties, he enjoyed entertaining at his country house near the village of Highclere in Hampshire where he was active in the local community and served as a Justice of the Peace. His health suffered from the effects of his war wounds, and he was subject to recurrent rheumatic fever. In 1939, his poor physical condition caused him to retire early from Hertford, followed by a period of mental illness possibly exacerbated by the continuing mockery from Waugh. He was ultimately confined to the Burden Neurological Institute at Stapleton, Bristol, where he died on 14 March 1941, aged 53. He left his book collection and a bequest of £1,000 to Hertford College, together with an oil portrait of him painted in 1937 by his cousin Grace Cruttwell. The probate value of his estate was £19,814.

== Reputation ==
Cruttwell's professional reputation has been overshadowed by the attention given to his feud with Waugh, the true significance of which, according to Geoffrey Ellis's biographical sketch, may have been exaggerated. Cruttwell's experiences as a soldier were such that he spent his entire career writing about war, according to another biographer. "In A History of Peaceful Change in the Modern World (1937) he wracks his brains for peaceful changes that were not contingent upon war". His standing as a military historian is largely based on his 1934 Great War history, which Ellis praises as "most notable for its frank and fearless judgements on those identified as the principal actors (military, naval and political) in that tragic conflict". The work was widely praised in the press at the time of publication; The Naval Review thought that its description of the Battle of Jutland was "admirable": "for those who wish to gain a clear but not too detailed idea of the general course of the war, and of the relations of the different parts of it to one another, the book should be invaluable". Against this, the Royal United Services Institute's review thought the book under-sourced and the quality of its writing poor in places. More recently, writer and broadcaster Humphrey Carpenter has criticised the book as lacking in humanity, displaying "almost no awareness of the appalling degree of suffering it chronicles". Nevertheless, historian Llewellyn Woodward considered it "the most profound study of any war in modern times", and the inspiration for his own Great War history of 1970, while strategist Colin S. Gray describes Cruttwell as "the most balanced of the historians of that conflict".

Cruttwell's relations with his colleagues and students have been the subject of contradictory reports. Waugh's biographer Selina Hastings describes him as "unprepossessing" in appearance, "good-hearted but difficult", inclined to misogyny, brusque and sometimes offensive towards his male colleagues. Waugh's description is of someone "tall, almost loutish, with the face of a petulant baby", of indistinct speech, who "smoked a pipe which was attached to his blubber-lips by a thread of slime". Stannard records that Waugh's student contemporary Christopher Hollis found nothing particularly remarkable about Cruttwell. "Like Waugh", says Stannard, "Cruttwell played up his eccentricities and had an uncharitable sense of humour". Ellis's 2004 biographical sketch suggests that much of Cruttwell's rebarbative manner may have been the result of simple shyness.

There was clearly mutual animosity between Cruttwell and Waugh, and Hastings points out that Cruttwell would have been justified in suspending Waugh from the college on numerous occasions but did not do so. Ellis acknowledges a "forceful, forthright and eccentric character" but stresses Cruttwell's generous hospitality to close friends and his concern for his undergraduates' welfare.

== Bibliography ==
A list of works published by C. R. M. F. Cruttwell:

- The War Service of the 1/4 Royal Berkshire Regiment (T.F.). Oxford: Basil Blackwell. 1922.
- British History, 1760–1822. London: G Bell & Co Ltd. 1928.
- European History, 1814–1878. London: G Bell & Co Ltd. 1932.
- A History of the Great War 1914–1918. Oxford: Clarendon Press. 1934.
- Wellington. London: Duckworth. 1936.
- The Role of British Strategy in the Great War. Cambridge: Cambridge University Press. 1936. (published version of the 1936 Lees-Knowles lectures.)
- A History of Peaceful Change in the Modern World. Oxford: Oxford University Press. 1937.
- The Medieval administration of the Channel Islands: 1199–1399. London: H. Milford, Oxford University Press. 1937. (Co-author with John H Le Patourel; George Norman Clark; Maurice Powicke.)

== Sources ==
- Amory, Mark, ed. (1995). The Letters of Evelyn Waugh. London: Phoenix. ISBN 978-1-85799-245-8. (Originally published by Weidenfeld and Nicolson, London 1980)
- Byrne, Paula (2010). Mad World: Evelyn Waugh and the secrets of Brideshead. London: Harper Press. ISBN 978-0-00724-377-8.
- Carpenter, Humphrey (1989). The Brideshead Generation: Evelyn Waugh and his Friends. London: Weidenfeld and Nicolson. ISBN 978-0-297-79320-5.
- Carver, Beci (2014). Granular Modernism. Oxford: Oxford University Press. ISBN 978-0-19870-992-3.
- Gray, Colin S. (2010). The Navy in the Post-Cold War World: The Uses and Value of Strategic Sea Power. University Park, PA: Pennsylvania State University Press. ISBN 978-0-27104-018-9.
- Hastings, Selina (1994). Evelyn Waugh: a biography. London: Sinclair-Stevenson. ISBN 978-1-85619-223-1.
- Patey, Douglas Lane (1998). The Life of Evelyn Waugh. Oxford, UK: Blackwell. ISBN 978-0-63118-933-6.
- Slater, Ann Pasternak, ed. (1998). Evelyn Waugh: the Complete Short Stories. London: Everyman's. ISBN 978-1-85715-190-9.
- Stannard, Martin (1993). Evelyn Waugh, Volume I: The Early Years 1903–1939. London: Flamingo. ISBN 978-0-586-08678-0.
- Waugh, Evelyn (1983). A Little Learning. Harmondsworth, UK: Penguin Books. ISBN 978-0-14-006604-3. (Originally published by Chapman and Hall, 1964)

Academic offices
| Preceded by Sir Walter Riddell | Principal of Hertford College, Oxford; 1930–1939 | Succeeded by Neville Richard Murphy |
