= George Lindor Brown =

English physiologist and academic (1903–1971)

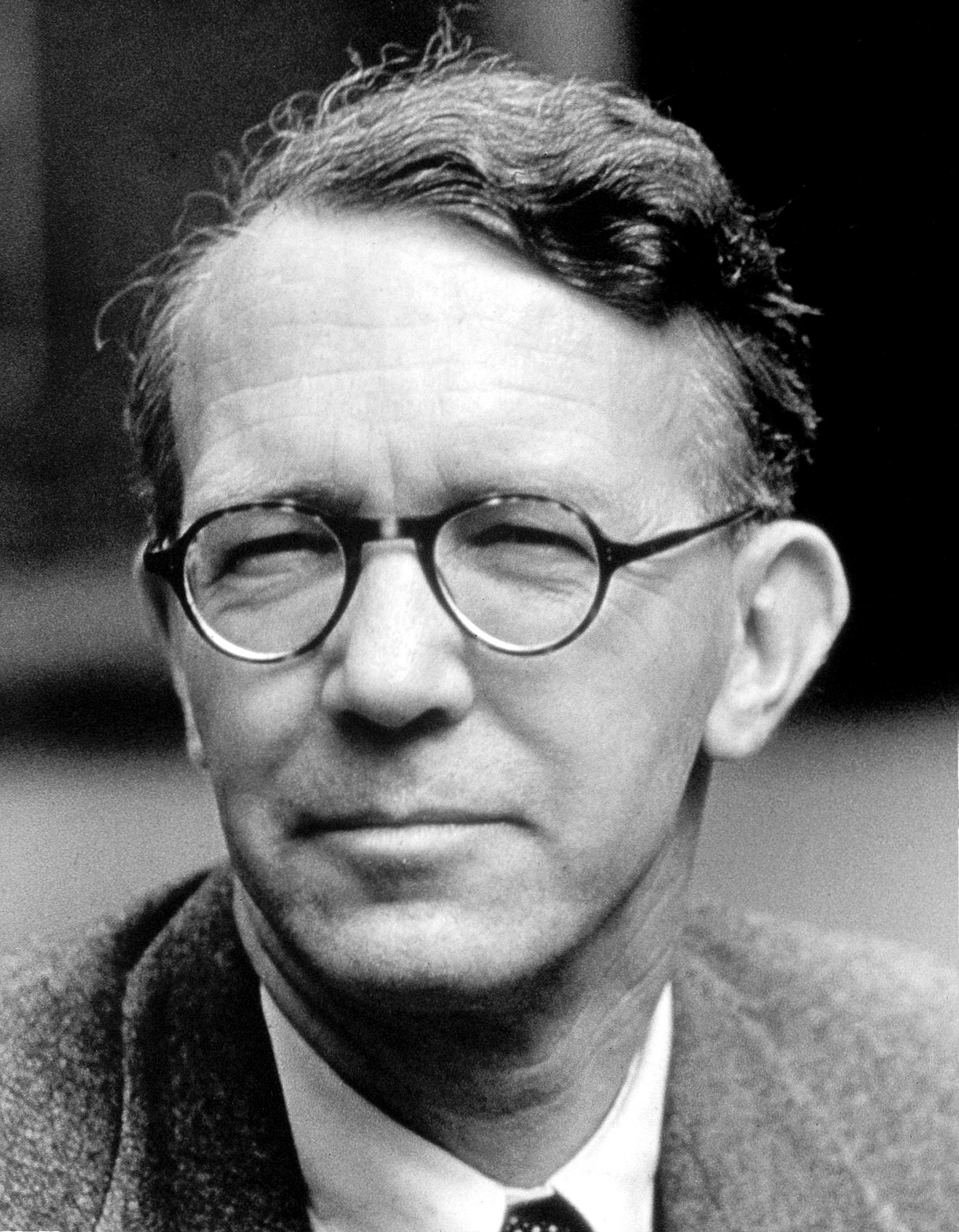
G.L. Brown

Sir George Lindor Brown CBE FRS (9 February 1903, Liverpool – 22 February 1971) was an English physiologist and secretary of the Royal Society, of which he was elected a Fellow in 1946.

He was commonly referred to as Sir Lindor Brown; by his own preference.

He was Waynflete Professor of Physiology at the University of Oxford from 1960 to 1967. He resigned from this post to become Principal of Hertford College.

Academic offices
| Preceded by Robert Hall | Principal of Hertford College, Oxford; 1967–1971 | Succeeded by Geoffrey Warnock |
