= Richard Newton (academic) =

English educator and clergyman

Richard Newton (8 November 1676 – 21 April 1753) was an English educator and clergyman.

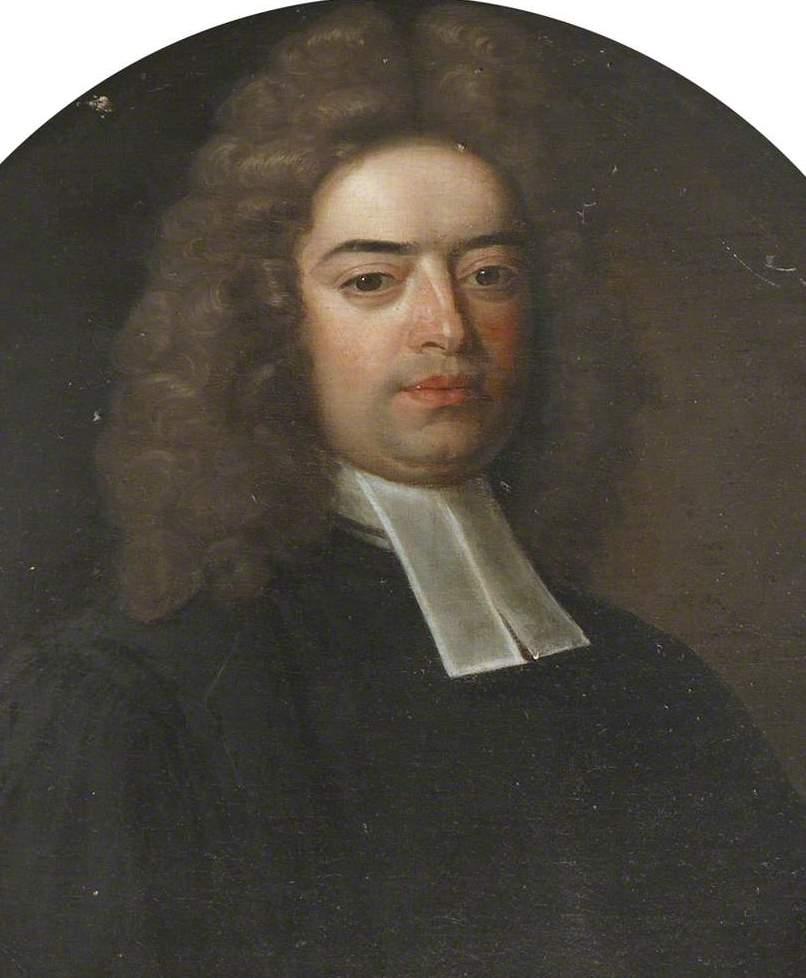
Richard Newton

Appointed Principal of Hart Hall, Oxford in 1710, he refounded Hart Hall as Hertford College, his statutes being accepted in 1739 and the charter granted in 1740, and remained Principal of Hertford College until his death in 1753.

== Early life ==
Newton was the youngest son of Thomas Newton, lord of the manor of Lavendon, Buckinghamshire, and his wife Katharine Hervey. He was born at Yardley Park, Northamptonshire, a house which his father rented from Lord Northampton, on 8 November 1676.

He was educated at Westminster School, being admitted in 1690, and at Christ Church, Oxford, matriculating on 16 June 1694, graduating B.A. 1698, M.A. 1701, B.D. 1708, D.D. 1710 (from Hart Hall).

He remained at Christ Church as a tutor, and was appointed rector of Sudborough, Northamptonshire in 1704. Despite a complaint in 1743 that he had not been resident in Sudborough for more than twenty years, he did not vacate the living until 1748.

== Hart Hall ==
On the recommendation of Henry Aldrich, Dean of Christ Church, Newton was appointed Principal of Hart Hall, installed on 28 July 1710.

He was also tutor to Lord Pelham's two sons, Thomas (the future Duke of Newcastle) and Henry Pelham, both future Prime Ministers. When Newton was appointed to Hart Hall, Henry Pelham accompanied him, being admitted to Hart Hall on 6 September 1710. Henry Pelham is said to have maintained an affection for both his college and his tutor, though he did not use his influence to their advantage. Pelham commented that Newton had never asked for anything.

Another of Newton's students at Hertford was George Augustus Selwyn, the politician and wit, who was rusticated in 1745 (he unregistered to avoid expulsion) for an irreverent joke that was deemed insulting to Christianity.

As principal of the hall, Newton worked towards two aims. He desired that it should be established as a college, and that poor students should be trained in it for the ministry on very moderate terms of payment. Newton built, at a cost of nearly £1,500, one-fourth part of a large quadrangle, consisting of a chapel, consecrated by John Potter, then Bishop of Oxford, on 25 November 1716, and an angle, containing fifteen single rooms; purchased the adjoining property at a cost of £160 more, and endowed the new institution with an annuity of £53 6s. 8d. paid from his estate at Lavendon. The other buildings, which were intended to comprise a library, hall, principal's lodgings, and further rooms for the students, were never erected, mainly through his disappointment in his expectations of assistance from the wealthy among his former pupils, and especially from the Pelhams.

Hart Hall had long paid a small quit-rent to Exeter College, and some of the college fellows, led by John Conybeare (Rector of Exeter College from 1730, then Dean of Christ Church from 1733), opposed its incorporation. When in 1734 Newton wrote an open letter to the Vice-Chancellor William Holmes complaining of obstruction by Exeter College, Conybeare responded with Calumny Refuted: Or, an Answer to the Personal Slanders Published by Dr. Richard Newton (1735); Newton responded with The Grounds of the Complaint of the Principal of Hart Hall (1735).

After many years Newton triumphed over all obstacles. The Attorney General advised against the claim of Exeter College, the proposed rules and statutes were confirmed by King George II on 3 November 1739, the charter was granted on 27 August 1740, and Newton became the first principal of Hertford College. For these long-continued exertions Newton incurred the charge of being 'founder-mad.'

Newton's statutes for Hertford College were strict, and aimed at economy and efficiency of supervision over the undergraduates by the tutors. Newton was well-versed in both classics and modern languages. He believed in disputations, and insisted on English composition, but not on poetry, except in the case of the pupils 'having a genius' for it. There are frequent sneers in the terræ filius oration of Nicholas Amhurst and the pamphlets of the period at his economical system of living.

Newton became a canon of Christ Church, Oxford in January 1753.

He died at Lavendon on 21 April 1753, and was buried in the chancel of Lavendon Church.

== Family ==
Newton married firstly Catherine, daughter of Andrew Adams of Welton, Northamptonshire, by whom he had one daughter, Jane, who married the Rev. Knightley Adams (1698–1769), a student of Newton's at Hart Hall, rector of Preston Capes, Northamptonshire.

He married secondly Mary, daughter of Sir Willoughby Hickman of Gainsborough, by Ann, daughter of Sir Stephen Anderson, and by her had no issue. She died on 5 July 1781, aged 82.

Academic offices
Preceded by Thomas Smith	Principal of Hart Hall, Oxford; 1710–1740	Succeeded by Himself as Principal of Hertford College
Preceded by Himself as Principal of Hart Hall	Principal of Hertford College, Oxford; 1740–1753	Succeeded by William Sharpe
