= Under-Secretary-General for Humanitarian Affairs and Emergency Relief Coordinator =

Senior United Nations role

Under-Secretary General for Humanitarian Affairs and Emergency Relief Coordinator of the United Nations
- Emblem of the United Nations

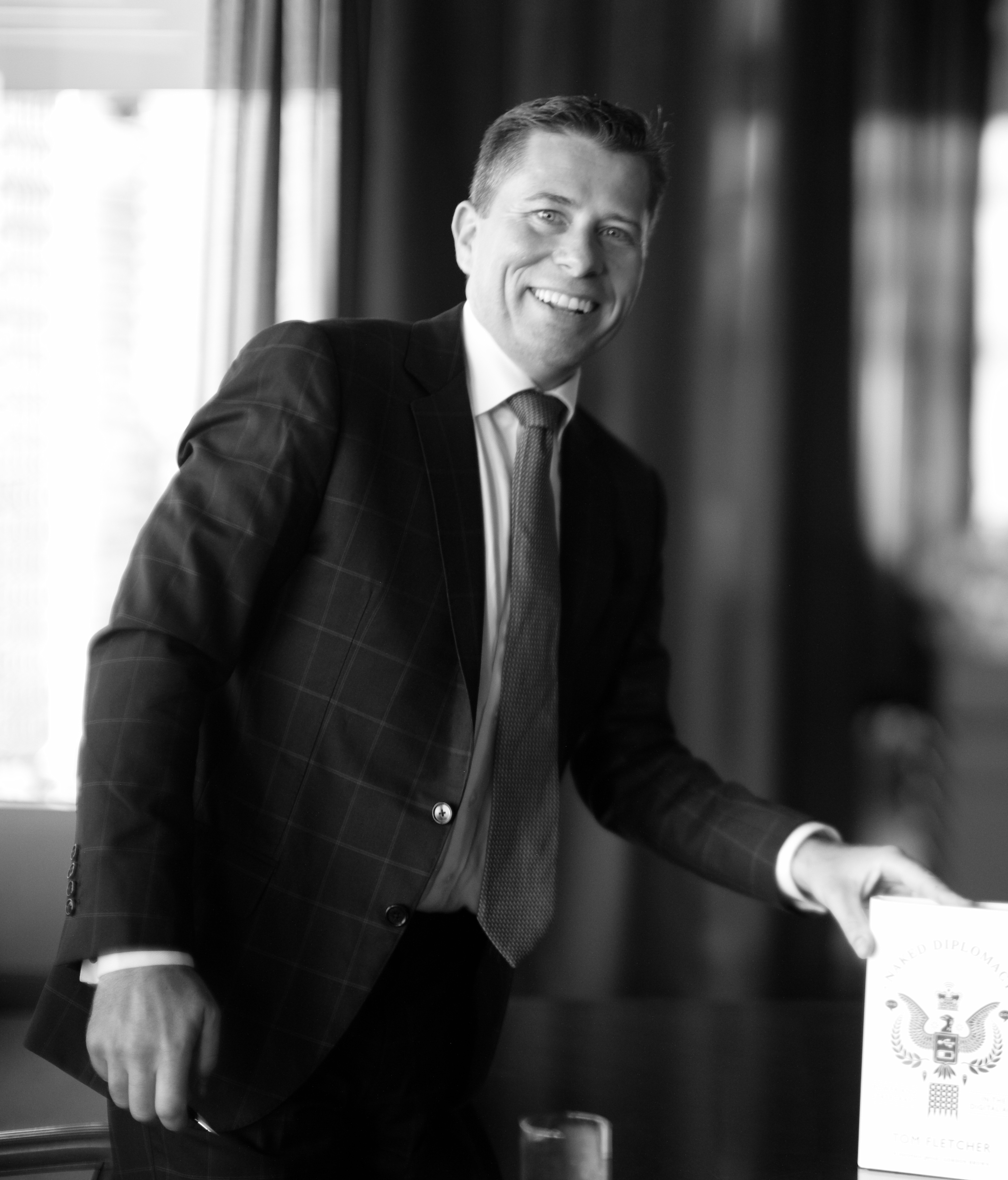
- Incumbent; Thomas Fletcher since October 2024
- Inaugural holder: Jan Eliasson; 1992
- Formation: General Assembly Resolution 46/182. December 1991
- Website: unocha.org

The Under-Secretary-General for Humanitarian Affairs and Emergency Relief Coordinator is a high-level position in the United Nations that heads the Office for the Coordination of Humanitarian Affairs.

The position has been held since October 2024 by Thomas Fletcher, the sixth Briton in a row to serve in the role.

== History ==
The post of Under-Secretary-General for Humanitarian Affairs and Emergency Relief Coordinator (ERC) was created by UN resolution 46/182 in December 1991 to coordinate the efforts of the United Nations, member states and the wider humanitarian community in response to natural and man-made emergencies.

The post is one of five cabinet-level UN positions that are traditionally held by nationals from the five permanent members of the Security Council; since 2007, six British nationals have been appointed to that position. Before 2007, British nationals held the position of Under-Secretary-General for Political and Peacebuilding Affairs for more than a decade.

== List of Under-Secretaries-General ==
#	Name	Nationality	Office entered	Office left
1	Jan Eliasson	Sweden	1992	1994
2	Peter Hansen	Denmark	1994	1996
3	Yasushi Akashi	Japan	1996	1998
4	Sérgio Vieira de Mello	Brazil	1998	January 2001
5	Kenzo Oshima	Japan	January 2001	June 2003
6	Jan Egeland	Norway	June 2003	December 2006
7	John Holmes	United Kingdom	January 2007	September 2010
8	Valerie Amos	United Kingdom	September 2010	May 2015
9	Stephen O'Brien	United Kingdom	May 2015	September 2017
10	Mark Lowcock	United Kingdom	September 2017	July 2021
11	Martin Griffiths	United Kingdom	July 2021	March 2024
12	Thomas Fletcher	United Kingdom	October 2024	current
