= Academic freedom in the Middle East =

Academic freedom in the Middle East is a contested and debated issue, which has caught regional and international attention. In the Middle East and North Africa (MENA) region, in general, the authoritarian regimes have all showed a certain degree of opposition to every sort of freedom, academic one not excluded, regardless of the type of regime basis they had. Freedom for academicians to inquiry, research, teach and communicate ideas or report facts without being threatened or persecuted or with the possibility of losing their position, being censored or repressed is threatened. What contributes to academic freedom violations is also that they are essential elements for the regimes to maintain their power and in addition to this issue, interstate and civil wars as well as internal disorders and external intervention can damage educational structures and institutions. Additionally, as far as the regime is concerned, a security or national threat can be a pretest for suffocate or suspend academic research and debate. Restrictions on academic freedom also regards the topics of research, which are under significant constraints, although these might be highly interesting and worth researching.

== Background ==
There are many organizations that deal with monitoring violations of academic freedom and report academicians' voices, through publishing letters directed to public figures and also directed to the international community.

=== Scholars at Risk ===
Scholars at Risk is an international network hosted at New York University's New York City campus, in the United States. The aim of this organization is to support threatened scholars and promote and defend academic freedom. One of the projects of this network is the Academic Freedom Monitoring Project.

==== Reported cases from the Academic Freedom Monitoring Project ====
The Academic Freedom Monitoring Project reports on attacks on academic freedom and higher education communities. It is based on robust sources of information, including reports from volunteer monitors, and are then verified. According to the Academic Freedom Monitoring Project, which reports cases since 2010 until now, there are different categories of violation regarding the issue. Regarding the Middle East and Northern Africa, the AFM registers cases in: Turkey, United Arab Emirates, Iran, Lebanon, Syria, Israel, Kuwait, Yemen, Iraq, Palestine (OPT), Bahrain, Saudi Arabia, Jordan, Egypt, Morocco, Libya and Tunisia.

==== Types of violations ====
Academic Freedom Monitor identifies different types of violations as following:

- Killings, violence or disappearances
- Wrongful imprisonment/detention
- Wrongful prosecution
- Restrictions on travel or movement
- Retaliatory discharge or loss of position/expulsion from study
- Other significant events

=== Committee on Academic Freedom ===
The Middle East Studies Association (MESA) is an association which brings together scholars and informed people with an interest in the MENA region. This association is the promoter of the International Journal of Middle East Studies and has the aim to promote cooperation and communication and boost learning regarding the Middle East. One of the fields it is dealing with regards academic freedom. This association has created a Committee on Academic Freedom (CAF), which aims to remove any obstacle regarding the exchange of knowledge and any restrictions on academicians coming also from governments.

== Turkey ==
=== History ===
Academic freedom in Turkey has been through a series of changes and fluctuations. It is often irregular, inadequate and closely tied to the politics in the country. Several reform initiatives have been taken throughout Turkey's history which aim at restructuring governance of higher education and thus affecting academic freedom. The first reform initiative was in 1933, as Malche was invited by Atatürk to restructure Istanbul University (Istanbul Darülfünun). One of the reforms that made it to the law 2252 was according universities with more freedom. In 1946, the Law Number 4936 accorded universities with unprecedented rights, as academicians were seen as guardians of democracy second to the military. The Democratic Party in 1953 passed laws that would undermine the universities' control over their budget, retirement of academicians and their employment rights. Those attacks on academic freedom were aimed at confining professors from being involved in partisan politics resulting in several cases of suspensions of academicians and denial of promotions. The 1960 coup was seen as a promise for reversal of the DP's encroachment over university autonomy, as it recruited academicians in government offices, selected to write the constitution and other vital roles. However, the 1960 coup junta surprisingly dismissed 147 academicians who were not in agreement with some members of the junta. In 1973, higher education was restructured with the increased sovereignty of the Interuniversity Council (ÜAK), while at the same time universities were given complete autonomy.

==== The Council of Higher Education (YÖK) ====
The current Higher Education Law was implemented in 1981 following the 1980 coup. The law maintains that, “universities are judicial structures which are managed and supervised by the organs selected among them. University organs, academics and teaching assistants cannot be removed from their posts for no reason by authorities outside the university” (YÖK 2007). Yet academic freedom became too dependent on The Council of Higher Education (YÖK) as the reform moved towards creating a more centralized system around the YÖK in matters regarding budgetary control, staff employment and student selection. The law defines the name, number and discipline of each faculty or vocational school. While universities can establish departments, their approval is subject to the council.

=== Academicians for Peace ===
On 11 January 2016, a petition was released titled "We will not be a Party to This Crime". 1,128 academics from 89 universities in Turkey, and over 355 academics and researchers from abroad including figures such as Noam Chomsky, Judith Butler, Etienne Balibar, Immanual Wallerstein and David Harvey have initially signed a text calling on state of Turkey to end its violence and prepare negotiation conditions. The petition condemns the Turkish state's security operations in southeast Turkey which devastated the Kurdish population and to resume the peace process. In response, President Recep Tayyip Erdoğan unleashed a harsh campaign vilifying the academics in at least five speeches – terming them vile, equal to terrorists, base and dark – and demanding sanctions against them. On March 15, 2016, three academics were placed in pretrial detention Muzaffer Kaya, Esra Mungan and Kıvanç Ersoy. Ersoy teaches in the mathematics department at Mimar Sinan University and Mungan in the psychology department at Boğaziçi University. Kaya was dismissed from the social work department at Nişantaşı University for signing the petition. They were detained and then jailed by a court a day after Erdoğan called for the crime of terrorism to be widened to include expression which he judges “serves the aims of terrorists,” and which would target professions such as journalists, politicians and activists. His remarks came after the March 13 bombing which killed 37 people in Ankara's city center.

The violation of academic freedom including the prosecution, dismissal, detention and public harassment of the Peace Academics has taken a turn to the worse following the July 15 coup attempt and the state of emergency that followed in Turkey. Around 822 of Academics for Peace have been put on trial, and more than 200 academics have been given prison terms, some charged with "propagandizing for a terrorist organization" under Article 7(2). Around 549 academicians have been removed and banned from public service with the decree laws or dismissed, forced to resign or forced into retiring.

On July 26, 2019, Turkey's Constitutional Court delivered its landmark verdict which ruled that the penalization of Academics for Peace on charge of “propagandizing for a terrorist organization” has violated their freedom of expression. In response to the Constitutional Court ruling, 1,066 academics from various universities came out against the ruling in a declaration, saying the verdict is "against the public conscience." The declaration was initially released with 1,071 signatories, however, some were signatures were added without consent or repeated twice bringing the number down to 1,066. The rights of the Academics for Peace still remain violated as many have not been compensated nor have they been allowed to regain their positions.

== Egypt ==
=== History ===
Egypt is one of the countries where academic freedom is not a right freely enjoyed. Since the start of the 1990s, academics in Egypt have faced several forms of repression and endured many violations such as judicial convictions, public condemnation, and physical violence from both private individuals and groups, mainly the Islamists, and government officials. On one hand, there are Egyptian state authorities using police, political appointees, and regulations and laws to control university life. On the other hand, Islamist militants are resorting to physical violence and public attacks to have a say in the content of higher education. All aspects of university life including the classroom, student activities, research, campus demonstrations were affected by government and private repression. The professors and students find themselves censored and unable to cross the “red lines” of politics, religion, and sex. Faculty appointments and promotions are controlled by the state. Student activities are limited once outside the classroom, and campus protests are often violently responded to. All these factors contribute to the deterioration of the academic freedom situation in Egypt and to the general decline of the educational environment.

==== Sisi's era ====
While Article 21 of the 2014 Egyptian constitution, issued under Abdel Fattah el-Sisi’s rule, ensures that “the state guarantees the independence of universities, scientific and linguistic academies” and that “it commits to providing university education in accordance with global quality criteria, and to developing free university education in state universities and institutes as per the law", the Egyptian state still violates its constitutional provisions through various repressive ways in an attempt to curb academic freedom. Article 23 of the constitution claims that “the state grants the freedom of scientific research and encourages its institutions.” However, freedom of scientific research has often been interfered with and even hindered on various occasions by state authorities. Universities under Sisi's rule have been described as “experiencing the lowest levels of academic freedom the country has ever known." In fact, many observers maintained that the violations against Egyptian academics under El-Sisi’s rule exceed those witnessed during Mubarak's time. In academic year 2014, 761 student arrests and 281 student expulsions took place. Moreover, the state sentenced to death a university professor for writing critical articles about the regime and accused him of “conspiring to undermine Egypt's national security”, and arrested many others who dared to criticize the regime. The state also monitors what ideas come in and not just the research that comes out. Several universities are canceling their study abroad programs or breaking off their cooperations with foreign universities. For example, Cairo's Ain Shams University canceled its study abroad program to Turkey and Damanhour University stopped its cooperation with foreign institutions. Furthermore, El-Sisi issued a decree banning any academic travel outside Egypt that does not have a prior State Security authorization. This way, the state would be able to control which conferences can be attended and what sources can be used. Even though this decree and many other violations are, according to the articles mentioned above, unconstitutional, they are still enforced.

=== Violations ===
There are various cases of academic freedom violations in Egypt. The following are just few of them. Professor Kholoud Saber had her scholarship abroad terminated by Cairo University. She was doing a doctoral research on a scholarship at the Catholic University of Leuven in Belgium, that started in October 2015, when she was ordered to return to Egypt following a recommendation of the Ministry of Higher education in December 2015. Fanny Ohier, a French Master's student, was arrested and later deported from Egypt. She was working on the April 6 Youth Movement, a group banned by the government as it was accused of state defamation and espionage. She was not given any reason for her arrest by the Egyptian officials but she, reportedly, overheard police officers claiming “she had improper friends.”

On another instance, scholar and journalist Ismail Alexandrani was detained, in November 2015, upon his return Egypt from a workshop in Germany. The Egyptian embassy in Berlin had apparently advised the scholar, who happens to be “a vocal critic of human rights violations in Egypt and counterterrorism policy in the Sinai Peninsula,” not to turn up to the workshop titled “Deconstructing Islamist Egypt" Upon Mr. Alexandrani's arrival to Egypt, his passport was confiscated and he was questioned for over 19 hours before getting arrested “on charges of ‘joining and supporting a terrorist organization’ and ‘spreading false news liable to disturb public security and harm public interest."

Patrick Zaki is an Egyptian postgraduate student at the University of Bologna, Italy, who has been detained in Egypt since February 7, 2020. Zaki is pursuing an Erasmus Mundus Master's Degree in Women and Gender Studies at the University of Bologna. Twenty-six Italian Members of the European Parliament wrote a letter to the Italian ambassador to Cairo, Giampaolo Cantini, asking for a decided commitment for the release of Patrick Zaki.

=== Giulio Regeni case ===
One of the most widely covered stories in relation to the situation of academic freedom in Egypt was the case of the Italian PhD candidate Giulio Regeni, a researcher at the University of Cambridge in the UK. Giulio Regeni was first found dead, in the outskirts of Cairo, a week after he was declared missing on January 25, 2016, which coincided with the fifth anniversary of the Egyptian uprising, and his body demonstrated clear signs of torture and severe beating. The PhD candidate was investigating the Egyptian labor movements at the American University of Cairo at the time of his murder. While government officials maintained that Regeni was kidnapped and murdered by a gang, international and Egyptian human rights activists claim that he was actually targeted for his research by the Egyptian government. The murder of Giulio Regeni remains unsolved. The case of the researcher, and the continuing imprisonment of hundreds of scholars and thousands of students and the various restrictions on academic freedom signal that there is an actual “not improvement but, rather, a further tightening of control, and loss of autonomy and freedom in Egyptian higher education, as well as a shrinking space for critical inquiry and discourse in Egypt generally."

== Israel ==
=== History ===
According to Ilan Pappe, in the aftermath of the Second Intifada Israeli academia experienced a decline in openness to pluralisic perspectives on debated issues such as revisionist history on the 1948 war, due in part to the decline of Israeli left parties.

=== Palestinian academia ===
Some international actors state that a situation of military occupation with its consequent policies of collective punishments and denial of entrance, such as checkpoints and the construction of the wall between Israel and West Bank, in the Occupied Palestinian Territories has affected access to education for Palestinians. After the beginning of the first Intifada, the ability for the students of West Bank Universities to study was limited, while later on, in 2006, a travel ban to get into Israel was issued for Palestinian students belonging to Israeli universities. Additionally, entry and residence denials for researchers and students, both foreign passport holders and Palestinian-born, threatened the ability to carry on a proper educational and research level in Palestinian universities.

Human Rights Watch reported various violations perpetrated by Israeli authorities on students, in the academic and educational environment. In 2007, 670 students from Gaza were prevented from achieving higher education in countries such as Egypt, Jordan, Germany, Britain and United States, by being denied the exit permits.

In June 2008, the organization again stated how discrimination by Israeli authorities prevented many Palestinian students from the Gaza Strip to travel abroad or to the West Bank to get a better education. Regarding the chances to travel abroad, in 2008, grants allocated for the Palestinians chosen to study in the United States were redirected because there was no way those students would be allowed by Israel to leave Gaza. Due to the inability to get a visa, the grants destined to Gaza students were transferred to students in the West Bank. THRW has highlighted the necessity and the right for those students to access higher education abroad, since in the Gaza Strip the opportunities are limited. There is not a wide range of degrees, both undergraduate and master's, in the four available universities, and there is a total absence of doctoral degrees. Lecturers and teachers from outside are rarely allowed by the Israeli government to enter and teach in Gaza.

This blockade has been said to be a clear violation of the Fourth Geneva Convention, because Israel's obligation to guarantee the rights of the people under occupation, including freedom of movement and the right to education, is not being fulfilled. However, according to international law, Gaza is not occupied since Israel no longer has any military presence in Gaza and Gaza has its own, independent government.

=== Israeli academia ===
Other types of restrictions regarding academic freedom affects also Israeli scholars, such as Ilan Pappe, an Israeli Jew, who has been forced to resign for the University of Haifa in 2007 for his academic work and political positions, such as academic boycott of Israel. The scholar started researching on the history of the creation of the state of Israel and elaborated a revisionist historical perspective regarding 1948 war. He received along with his family death threats.

In an interview with Ma’an News, in February 2014, he was asked about academic freedom in Israel and especially regarding his personal experience. He stated:

“Freedom of academic expression in Israel is a bit like the idea of a Israel being a Jewish democracy. You take a universal concept -- everyone has the right to their opinion and everyone has the right to be part of a democracy -- only with one condition: that the universality does not include critique on Zionism and that the democracy would always ensure Jewish majority whatever the demographic and geographical realities are.”

== Iran ==
=== History ===
During the years that followed the 1979 Iranian revolution, hundreds of academicians and students were killed as a consequence of a highly violent campaign that aimed to repress academic freedom, silence dissent, and enforce uniformity of thought. The freedoms of speech, association, and peaceful assembly of thousands of students and faculty members were breached through various methods of brutality, torture and detention. The reasons behind the arrests and torture ranged from “participating in illegal gatherings”, “propaganda against the system”, to “insulting the supreme leader or government officials.” Other tens of thousands of students and faculty members were forced out of their education and careers and into exile. These assaults on academic freedom continued all throughout the 1980s and became a salient feature of the newly established republic. Paradoxically, it was in universities where the initial revolutionary ‘texts’, aimed to oust the Shah, were produced and circulated. Indeed, universities came to represent the de facto ‘spaces’ where open-ended critical discourse was taking place. Nevertheless, they became the primary target of attack after the fall of the monarchy and the rise of Ayatollah Khomeini to power.

==== Contemporary Era ====
A merciless campaign of repression has been waged by the Iranian authorities against academic freedom during the last three decades. Academics and students were routinely detained, harassed and expelled from universities because of their beliefs, political affiliations and peaceful activism. The use of coercion and repressive methods was stepped up after the election of President Mahmoud Ahmadinejad in 2005. The latter attempted to ‘Islamize’ the educational curriculum through purging it from secular and ‘Western’ influences. Furthermore, a large number of students and academics were barred from universities, following a policy of “starring” that punished those who do not conform to the state's political and social views. The government of President Ahmadinejad also introduced a quota system to limit the number of women in universities and measures to prevent them from enrolling in a list of courses considered more appropriate for men. A firm iron grip was retained over academic institutions by the Iranian authorities to the degree of allowing intelligence bodies and state security to supervise disciplinary proceedings in universities.

The next president who assumed office in 2013, Hassan Rouhani—considered by many as a ‘reformist’-, made some steps to permit the return of several banned academics and students to campuses. Nonetheless, the situation of academic freedom remained critical with hundreds of students still imprisoned and others newly arrested since the election of President Rouhani. By the end of the academic year under the administration of the latter, various restrictions breaching academic freedom and introduced during the time of President Mahmoud Ahmadinejad remained in place.

=== Violations ===
Several international instruments, to which Iran is party and accepted, such as the International Covenant on Economic Social and Cultural Rights (ICESCR), the Universal Declaration of Human Rights (UDHR), and the UNESCO Convention against Discrimination in Education clearly guarantee the right to education to all people without discrimination. In addition to that, the rights of individuals to freedoms of association, expression, opinion, and assembly and the prohibition of discrimination based on sex, race, religion, ethnicity or political opinion, are further protected by the International Covenant on Civil and political Rights (ICCPR) and the International Convention on the Elimination of Racial Discrimination (CERD).

However, students and academics in Iran still face pervasive and routine infringements of their rights based on gender, religion, ethnicity and opinions. In the period stretching from March 2009 to February 2012, 396 cases of students were reportedly banned from their university programs because of their peaceful activism. At least 634 other students were detained by the intelligence and security network. Student activists were suspended, threatened, arrested and prosecuted on a regular basis due to their peaceful criticism of the regime. Iranian officials have also resorted to shutting down hundreds of student publications, gatherings, and independent organizations. Moreover, the intelligence and paramilitary agencies are strongly present in university campuses and sometimes violently confront students through attacking peaceful gatherings or dormitories, which often leads to grave injuries and even the death of many students. Furthermore, the minorities living in the republic of Iran are confronted with systematic discrimination and deprivation in universities. One example illustrating this case is that of the Baha’i community who are prevented from pursuing higher education because of their different religious beliefs. Iranian authorities also specifically punish student activists advocating for ethnic minority rights in harsher ways. The punishments range from violent arrests to heavy sentences including the death sentence. Women are also subject to discrimination at the educational level. The establishment of a quota system to limit female participation in universities is curbing women's rights. Further restrictions on women's educational choices are enforced. The issue of gender segregation, which does not always guarantee quality education for women, persists. Academics and teaching personnel are also subject to discrimination with their rights constantly violated. More than a hundred academics were dismissed from universities, because of their dissent against the government and their political views, since the 2009 election. In addition to that, several university professors have been imprisoned for merely expressing peaceful dissent.

=== The case of Professor Homa Hoodfar ===
A Canadian-Iranian professor of anthropology from Concordia University in Montreal, Homa Hoodfar, was detained in Iran on the 6th of June, 2016. She was interrogated for three months before being locked in a small cell in Evin Prison by the Iranian intelligence service. Evin prison in Iran is referred to as ‘Evin University’ due to the large number of intellectuals detained there. Professor Hoodfar spent 112 days in prison for meddling in affairs of “feminism and security matters.” She was released in September 2016 on “humanitarian grounds” after Canada's cooperation with officials from Oman, Switzerland and Italy to ensure her release. Canada worked with the latter countries because it cut its direct diplomatic ties with Iran in 2012.

Professor Hoodfar later reported that even though she was not physically abused, the interrogations were severely psychologically distressing. The questioning would last from 9am to 7pm in a basement, where professor Hoodfar would either be facing a wall or a mirror preventing her from seeing her interrogators. As examples of psychological abuse, the professor revealed that one day, during questioning, Iranian officials played a song from her husband's funeral that took place two years before, after they had found a clip of it on her iPad. In another instance, they displayed a picture of “her mother standing at her father's graveside.”

=== The case of Professor Ahmad Reza Jalali ===
Professor Ahmad Reza Jalali is an Iranian-Swedish doctor, lecturer and researcher in disaster medicine. He has worked in several universities in Europe, including Karolinska University of Sweden, Università degli Studi del Piemonte Orientale (Italy), Vrije Universiteit Brussel (Belgium). He was arrested in April 2016, when visiting Iran upon invitation from the University of Tehran and Shiraz University. He has been accused of espionage and collaboration with Israel and sentenced to death.

== See also ==
- Institute for Monitoring Peace and Cultural Tolerance in School Education
- Education in the Middle East and North Africa
- Saudi Arabian textbook controversy
- Textbooks in the Israeli–Palestinian conflict
- Democracy in the Middle East
- Insulting Turkishness
- Academic boycott of Israel
- Scholars at Risk
