= Turkish textbook controversies =

Turkish textbooks have faced criticism for their negative depiction of Christians — particularly Greeks and Armenians — lack of depiction or explicit denial of Ottoman-era massacres and genocides, denial of the existence of the Kurdish people, as well as understating and condoning Ottoman-era slavery. According to a study by Abdulkerim Şen, human rights education in Turkey subscribes to the 'escapist model'; Şen explains that Turkish textbooks either deliberately avoid human rights issues, struggles, campaigns, and activists altogether, or window-dress human rights issues by presenting de-contextualised narratives. Şen further states that the curriculum fails in respect of critically examining on discrepancies about claims made in Turkish textbooks vis-à-vis realities of human rights; and has scope to improve the curriculum encouraging learners to explore transformative powers of Human Rights Education.

Since the early twentieth century, under the leadership of Mustafa Kemal Atatürk, Turkey attempted to modernize and secularize its public life and education, various Turkish government dispensations, going back to Founding of the Turkish Republic had been promoting the Islamization of Turkish education in the name of promoting national unity; After Erdoğan came to power, the process of radicalizing Islamism in Turkish education and compromising on science education accelerated further.

According to Fatma Müge Göçek, in Turkey, the Education Ministry controlled the entire system ranging from textbooks, teacher training, course content, and even the questions asked at graduation examinations. One outcome of this policy was the excessive centralization of knowledge production. Moreover, most textbooks were penned by retired officers at the expense of other scholars who lacked the kinds of connections the ex-officers had. Göçek says that popular public intellectuals participated in the construction of this nationalistic presentation alongside scholars. The state's inclusion of non-academic groups into discussions on how to write history textbooks further popularized and mythified Turkish history. Göçek states that such nationalist interference in the production of knowledge obviously colored and affected all subsequent research. The proofs of Turkish history textbooks were also continually reviewed with a similar intention, one memoir writer noted, “to correct the mistakes...of many of the history books published in our country... [that] had either consciously or unknowingly minimized the role of Turks in world history.” Göçek explains that as a consequence, instead of promoting critical thinking, the information contained in the textbooks ended up regurgitating the official Turkish nationalist rhetoric.

== Islamisation of education and creationism ==
During the one-party period of the Republic of Turkey, textbook coverage was aggressively secular. Following the 1980 Turkish coup d'état, the military leadership and subsequent governments promoted Islamism to promote national unity, which eventually included translation and distribution of materials from the US Institute for Creation Research and creationist high-school textbooks. A survey published in 2008 found that about 25% of people in Turkey accepted evolution as an explanation for how life came to exist. As of 2009, creationism had become the government's official position on origins.

In 2009, the Turkish government agency Scientific and Technological Research Council of Turkey (TÜBİTAK), publisher of the popular Turkish science magazine Bilim ve Teknik (Science and Technology), was accused of stripping a cover story about the life and work of Charles Darwin from the March 2009 issue of the Council's publication just before it went to press. The planned portrait of Darwin for the magazine's cover was replaced and the editor of the magazine, Çiğdem Atakuman, claims that she was removed from her post. Most of the Turkish population expressed support for the censorship. In 2012, it was found that the government's internet content filter, designed to prevent the public having access to pornographic websites, also blocked the words 'evolution' and 'Darwin' on one mode of the filter.

Ateizm Derneği (Association of Atheism of Turkey) evaluated a course textbook called Din Kültürü ve Ahlâk Bilgisi dersi kitabında (Religious Culture and Moral Knowledge) which was mandated as a part of the syllabus from 9th grade until graduation since 2014. The Association of Atheism believes that the mandatory course on Islamic education encourages students to otherize non-Muslims and divide Turkish society on religious lines.

In 2017, Turkey announced plans to end the teaching of evolution in Turkish schools, with the chairman of the Board of Education, Alpaslan Durmuş, claiming it was a complicated and "controversial" topic for students. Other changes introduced the teaching of 'Jihad' as a part of loving the nation in religious schools known as Imam Hatip schools as part of vocational education, and in general secondary schools as optional subject. Activist Dr. Aysel Madra of 'Turkey's Education Reform Initiative' says that it will only confuse the students and finds it odd to claim that students can understand 'Jihad' but not evolution; On the other hand, Turkey's Minister of Education Ismet Yilmaz claimed that while theory of evolution is above level of school students and can be taught at university levels and information on mutation, modification and adaptation is still explained in biology textbooks, without referring to evolution itself.

=== Debate and protests ===
Since 2017, President Recep Tayyip Erdoğan's right-wing government changed school textbooks to introduce Jihad and terminate teaching of evolution from school textbooks; political parties and even teachers' unions got divided over newly introduced changes in textbooks. Turkish MP Bülent Tezcan of the opposition party Republican People's Party (CHP) and ruling Justice and Development Party (AKP) led by Recep Tayyip Erdoğan accused each other. While Erdoğan claimed of creating pious generation, Tezcan doubted the changes as "embedding jihadist values in education, Erdoğan government is attempting to plague the brains of little Turkish children, with the similar understanding that transforms the Middle East into a bloodbath". The teachers unions were also divided in the 'teaching of Jihad' debate; according to Turkey's progressive teachers' union EĞİTİM SEN's leader Feray Aydoğan, when jihad's primary meaning is 'religious war' then there is no point in explaining second and third meanings of the contested term; where as more conservative rival union blamed critics of using anti-Islamic arguments. Opponents of Erdoğan government's new education policy have blamed President Recep Tayyip Erdoğan's ruling Justice and Development Party (AKP) for shifting the secular foundations of the Turkish republic towards Islamic and conservative values.

Opponents of Erdoğan's new education policy carried out two sizable protests to say No to an outdated curriculum that bans science in the 21st Century; while hashtags such as #NoToSexistCurriculum, #SayNoToNonScientificCurriculum and #DefendSecularEducation trended on social media in Turkey.

== Coverage of History ==
According to Eray Alaca, if number of universities in Turkey are taken into account research thesis on theses on history textbooks in Turkey between studied period of 1989 and 2017 comes out to be too small, in that too most papers are master level where as number of doctoral theses on the topic are too meager. Alaca says that while most of postgraduate papers discuss history textbooks in Turkey, nevertheless considerable number of papers focus on how the Turkish/Ottoman discourse is handled in textbooks foreign countries namely erstwhile countries which were colonized under Ottoman rules previously. Alaca says that most thesis examine history textbooks in uncritical romanticized narrow point of views.

=== Coverage of slavery ===
According to Avarogullari Ayten and Muhammet, slavery in Turkish and Islamic history is mostly omitted or condoned in Turkish school textbooks. Contents in the history and social studies school textbooks in Turkey contain substantial non inclusion and misrepresentations related to pre modern slavery in Turkey and Islam.

Avarogullaris sees some patterns in the way slavery is dealt with in Turkish school textbooks. First, slavery as an issue that occurred mainly in the West; While institutionalized western slavery are rightly criticized in Turkish textbooks. But avoids any mention of existence of slaves in the Islamic world and how Muslims got their own slaves, especially in the Ottoman past of Turks and their actual treatment on the ground. Such omission creates an impression that there was no slavery in Turkish past, or slaves in Turkish history were very happy.

While textbooks are quick in criticizing west for its part in slavery but fail to give due credit to western societies for their initiative in the abolition of slavery. Actual fact that it was proactive British diplomatic pressure in nineteenth century and Ottoman rulers need to maintain its positive image led to eventual gradual abolishing of slavery from Ottoman Empire. Rather Turkish textbooks paint incorrect picture that it was Islam which banned slavery, factually Islam never banned slavery rather permitted capturing and trading of slaves continued rather with bit of encouragement for better treatment to slaves and encouragement to manumission but that does not amount to complete abolition of slavery, but Turkish textbooks tell the students otherwise.

Turkish textbooks cherry-pick in while depicting wherever and whenever Turks were taken into slavery but go silent on own Turkish past which was proactively participated in enslavement and trade of slaves.

While Turkish textbooks take note of role of European Human Rights Convention and Universal Declaration of Human Rights in abolishing slavery but miss on human elements which strived for the goal, which happened to be some proactive westerners.

Turkish textbooks create perception that only African black people were enslaved but factually largest number of slaves traded and used in premodern Turkey were Russians than Africans since Ottomans had frequent wars with Russians were taken as war prisoners whereas they had to pay to buy African slaves from traders still prices for White slaves were more and Women slaves were more than male slaves, male slaves were most frequently castrated.

- According to Sak (1992, p. 218) a report giving details of ethnic origin of slaves used in Turkey based on court records of six provinces of Ottoman Empire, in percentage
- Russian 20.12%, Black 11.47%, Georgian 8.48%, Persian 4.26%, Hungarian 2.29%, Cherkes 1.85%, Abyssinian 1.67%, Romanian (Eflaki and Bogdani in the original text) 1.54%, Polish 1.5%, Muscovite 1.06%, Serfi (?) 0.62%, Croat 0.52%,
- Abkhazian 0.4%, European (Efrenci in the original text) 0.35%, Austrian 0.31%, Armenian 0.21%, Greek 0.18%, Tuti (?) 0.13%,
- Albanian 0.04%, Barbary 0.04%, Bosnian 0.04%, Frank 0.04%, Morean 0.04%,
- Bulgarian 0.08%, Indian 0.08%, Wallach 0.08%

While Turkish text books talk of human rights, depict enslavement as inhuman but only western slavery is singled out for the purpose in negative role. Avarogullaris say that treatment of past slavery in Turkish textbooks produces falsely prejudiced generations which end up believing that slavery was only a western phenomena unaware of phenomena of slavery in Turkish and Islamic past. According to Avarogullaris instead of hiding Turkish and Islamic past of human slavery, Turkish textbooks should have helped pupil face it and help them understand how slavery in Turkey was abolished peacefully.

== Coverage of ethnic groups ==
=== Assyrians ===
The textbooks highlight the supposed benevolence of Ottoman and Turkish leaders towards all ethnic groups and refer to a "so-called Assyrian genocide". The textbooks claim that no Assyrians were deported during World War I.

=== Greeks and Greece ===
According to Bruce Merry, While Greek and Turkish both historiographies in school textbooks are biased about each other and modern historians accept the fact that both committed violence on each other in historic times, still Turkish schoolbooks give lot of space to centuries of presumably beneficent Ottoman rule which amounts to period of Turkish domination to Greek perception. Turkish textbooks squeeze history of 18th and 19th century since Ottomans faced uprisings in occupied territories lost hold blaming the same on 'interference from European great powers' and mentions of Greek independence struggle are omitted. According to Mustafa Aydın, Turks seem to silence lot of part of their history to fortify legitimacy of national sovereignty. Aydın says, if recent important changes in textbooks are critically examined doubt, fear and unease become apparent. Aydın says, while attributing the other with negative adjectives is reduced under pressure from third party criticism, however general approach in respect of history vis a vis others has not changed. Greeks and Turks, textbooks of both do not attribute positive to neighboring nations nor any negative to self historical conducts. In many parts neighboring country is depicted negatively without naming and students fill missing parts from sources like historiography, literature, oral history, media, movies provided by community around them.

A study on the Turkish textbooks conducted by Hay Eytan Cohen Yanarocak for the Institute for Monitoring Peace and Cultural Tolerance in School Education (IMPACT-SE) was published in 2021, which includes notes on the Turkish narrative of affairs related to Greece. For example, the indigenous Muslims (as are officially referred in the Lausanne Treaty, and as are recognized by the Greek authorities) of Greece are referred as Turks in the Turkish school books, and claims of discrimination against them are made. The 1955 pogrom against the minosrities of Istanbul is not mentioned at all.

=== Armenians ===
Education in Turkey is centralized: its policy, administration and content are each determined by the Turkish government. Textbooks taught in schools are either prepared directly by the Ministry of National Education (MEB) or must be approved by its Instruction and Education Board. In practice, this means that the Turkish government is directly responsible for what textbooks are taught in all schools, even private education or those that are dedicated to ethnic minorities. The state uses its monopoly to promote the official position of Armenian Genocide denial and textbooks have also included demonization of Armenians, presenting them as enemies.

For decades, these textbooks omitted any mention of Armenians as part of Ottoman history. Since the 1980s, textbooks discuss the "events of 1915", but deflect the blame from the Ottoman government to other actors, especially imperialist powers who allegedly manipulated the Armenians to achieve their nefarious goals of undermining the empire, and the Armenians themselves, for allegedly committing treason and presenting a threat to the empire. Some textbooks admit that deportations occur and Armenians died, but present this action as necessary and justified. Most recently, textbooks have accused Armenians of perpetrating genocide against Turkish Muslims. In 2003, students in each grade level were instructed to write essays refuting the genocide.

In 2014, Taner Akçam, writing for the Armenian Weekly, discussed 2014–2015 Turkish elementary and middle school textbooks that the MEB had made available on the internet. He found that Turkish history textbooks are filled with the message that Armenians are people "who are incited by foreigners, who aim to break apart the state and the country, and who murdered Turks and Muslims." The Armenian Genocide is referred to as the "Armenian matter", and is described as a lie perpetrated to further the perceived hidden agenda of Armenians. Recognition of the Armenian Genocide is defined as the "biggest threat to Turkish national security".

Akçam summarized one textbook that claims the Armenians had sided with the Russians during the war. The 1909 Adana massacre, in which as many as 20,000–30,000 Armenians were massacred, is identified as "The Rebellion of Armenians of Adana". According to the book, the Armenian Hnchak and Dashnak organizations instituted rebellions in many parts of Anatolia, and "didn't hesitate to kill Armenians who would not join them," issuing instructions that "if you want to survive you have to kill your neighbor first." Claims highlighted by Akçam:

[The Armenians murdered] many people living in villages, even children, by attacking Turkish villages, which had become defenseless because all the Turkish men were fighting on the war fronts. ... They stabbed the Ottoman forces in the back. They created obstacles for the operations of the Ottoman units by cutting off their supply routes and destroying bridges and roads. ... They spied for Russia and by rebelling in the cities where they were located, they eased the way for the Russian invasion. ... Since the Armenians who engaged in massacres in collaboration with the Russians created a dangerous situation, this law required the migration of [Armenian people] from the towns they were living in to Syria, a safe Ottoman territory. ... Despite being in the midst of war, the Ottoman state took precautions and measures when it came to the Armenians who were migrating. Their tax payments were postponed, they were permitted to take any personal property they wished, government officials were assigned to ensure that they were protected from attacks during the journey and that their needs were met, police stations were established to ensure that their lives and properties were secure.

Other false claims found in other textbooks by Akçam included that Armenian "back-stabbing" was the reason the Ottomans lost the Russo-Turkish War of 1877–78 (similar to the post-War German stab-in-the-back myth), that the Hamidian massacres never happened, that the Armenians were armed by the Russians during late World War I to fight the Ottomans (in reality they had already been nearly annihilated from the area by this point), that Armenians killed 600,000 Turks during said war, and that the deportation were to save Armenians from other violent Armenian gangs.

In 2015 teachers were instructed to teach seventh-year students as follows:

State to your students that the Russians also made some Armenians revolt on this front and murder many of our civilian citizens. Explain that the Ottoman State took certain measures following these developments, and in May 1915 implemented the ‘Tehcir Kanunu’ [Displacement Law] regarding the migration and settlement of Armenians in the battleground. Explain that care was taken to ensure that the land in which the Armenians who had to migrate were to settle was fertile, that police stations were established for their security and that measures were taken to ensure they could practice their previous jobs and professions.

Historian Tunç Aybak states, "This officially distributed educational material reconstructs the history in line with the denial policies of the government portraying the Armenians as backstabbers and betrayers, who are portrayed as a threat to the sovereignty and identity of modern Turkey. The demonization of the Armenians in Turkish education is a prevailing occurrence that is underwritten by the government to reinforce the denial discourse."

In 2012, history and literature teachers of Istanbul's Kartal district high schools in Istanbul's distributed a controversial book titled “Bu Dosyayı Kaldırıyorum: Ermeni Meselesi” (“Closing this File: The Armenian Issue” authored by Yunus Zeyrek) among students, as sent by the education directorate. The book defined Armenians as “dishonorable and treacherous” also vilified novelists such as Nobel Prize Laureate Orhan Pamuk and writer Elif Şafak. Education Minister Ömer Dinçer defended book and author as “written with the sense of national reflex and humorous criticism.”

In 2013, there was a proposal to ban some official Turkish textbooks in Germany because they were perceived as too nationalistic and falsifying history.

=== Kurds ===
For decades, Turkish history textbooks denied the existence of Kurds. According to Karwan Faidhi Dri, 2020 version by the Turkish education ministry removed many paragraphs about Kurdish participation in early Islamic history included in the 2019 version of ninth grade reading material.

=== Jews and Israel ===
According to Hay Eytan Cohen Yanarocak, Turkish textbooks while taking credit for better treatment of 20th century“stateless Jew” compared to European Christians; Turkish schoolbooks continue to venerate Islam at the expense of Jewish customs and Judaism claiming to be false ones. Stereotyping of Jews as traitorous in their exchanges with Muslims during the early history of Islam also continues in the textbooks under AKP regime. Turkish textbooks depict creation of modern state of Israel and Jews in negative light without explaining reasons like persecution of Jews leading to Zionism.

=== Circassians ===
According to Ayhan Kaya study, in Turkey Circassians are usually presumed to be privileged ethnic minority even though, in practical terms, socially politically and culturally they are as much discriminated against as other ethnic minorities of Turkey. According to Ayhan Kaya and Zeynel Abidin Besleney, Turkish political developments of 1920s lead to stereotyping of then Circassian leader Çerkes Ethem in school textbooks as traitor leading to stereotyping of Turkish Circassian community and discrimination towards them.

Kaya study says generally majority society remains tolerant of minorities when it is prospering but tolerance gets compromised in times of crisis. Kaya says while Turkey's state institutions can be tolerant of folkloric forms of representations presented by ethno-cultural minorities, but parochial nationalism is embraced by the majority Turkish society still leads to intolerance of political expression of minorities. Kaya says Turkish state had been pursuing vigorous policies of assimilation towards its minorities through its policies like nationalist curriculum since it became Republic, undermining linguistic plurality and right to education in their respective mother tongue including Cirassian language. Kaya says in case of Circassians, they find politically marginalized and isolated since establishment of the Turkish Republic.

== Sexism ==
According to September 2017 news report of Öykü Altuntaş, a Turkish text book 'Life of Muhammad' defines women's "obedience" to men as a form of "worship" and Alpaslan Durmuş, Chair of the Board of Education, defends the same saying, 'that is how Allah says it, not he himself and should he correct Allah, or what?'. In 2018 a textbook controversy arose over appropriateness of a text book Keloğlan Ak Ülke for 3rd standard attempted to deal with topic of sexual exploitation of children.

== See also ==
- Bias in education
- Education in Turkey
- Racism in Turkey
- Anti-Armenian sentiment in Turkey
- Circassians in Turkey
- Creationism by country § Turkey
- Ottoman Empire
- Ottoman Turkish language
- Çerkes Ethem
- The Twenty Classes
- Human rights in Turkey
- Textbook controversies (disambiguation)
- Turkish Abductions
- Antisemitism in Turkey
- Slavery in the Ottoman Empire
- Slave market
- Concubinage § In Islam and the Arab world
- Hürrem Sultan
- Xenophobia and discrimination in Turkey

== Bibliography ==
- Self-Censorship in Contexts of Conflict: Theory and Research edited by Daniel Bar-Tal, Rafi Nets-Zehngut, Keren
- Çayır, Kenan (2015). "Citizenship, nationality and minorities in Turkey's textbooks: from politics of non-recognition to 'difference multiculturalism'". Comparative Education. 51 (4): 519–536. doi:10.1080/03050068.2015.1088210. S2CID 143265420.
- Religion and Nation-Building in the Turkish Republic: Comparison of High School History Textbooks of 1931–41 and of 1942–50 Pages 372-393 Published online: 26 Jun 2013 Religion and Nation-Building in the Turkish Republic: Comparison of High School History Textbooks of 1931–41 and of 1942–50 Turkish Studies Volume 14, 2013 - Issue 2 Taylor & Francis
- The Bloomsbury Handbook of Religious Education in the Global South. United Kingdom, Bloomsbury Publishing, 2022.
