= Jews, Israel and Peace in Palestinian School Textbooks =

Jews, Israel and Peace in Palestinian School Textbooks is a November 2001 publication by the Institute for Monitoring Peace and Cultural Tolerance in School Education -- then the Center for Monitoring the Impact of Peace -- on how Palestinian school textbooks portray peace and the 'Other', namely Jews and Israel. The publication is the first in a series of textbook analyses on Palestinian textbooks, with the most recent publication, Palestinian Textbooks: From Arafat to Abbas and Hamas, published in March 2008.

== See also ==
- Institute for Monitoring Peace and Cultural Tolerance in School Education
- Textbooks in the Israeli–Palestinian conflict
- Textbooks in Israel
- Israeli–Palestinian conflict
- Arab–Israeli conflict
