= Textbook controversies (disambiguation) =

Textbook controversies arise from bias in curricula.

Textbook controversies or Textbook controversy may refer to:

- Japanese history textbook controversies
- Korean history textbook controversies
- NCERT textbook controversies, in India
- Pakistani textbooks controversy
- Saudi Arabian textbook controversy
- Turkish textbook controversies
- 2016–17 California textbook controversy over South Asian topics, United States
- California textbook controversy over Hindu history, United States
- Kanawha County Textbook War, in West Virginia, United States

== See also ==
- Creation and evolution in public education in the United States
- Textbooks in the Israeli–Palestinian conflict
- Lies My Teacher Told Me, a 1995 book by James W. Loewen
