= National curriculum =

A national curriculum is a common programme of study in schools that is designed to ensure nationwide uniformity of content and standards in education. It is usually legislated by the national government, possibly in consultation with state or other regional authorities.

National curriculum assessment generally means testing of students as to whether they meet the national standards.

Notable national curricula are:

- Australian Curriculum is a planned curriculum for schools in all states and territories of Australia, from Kindergarten to Year 12. Its first stages were planned to start in 2013.
- National Curriculum and Textbook Board for Bangladesh.
- National Curriculum Framework (NCF 2005) for India
- in the United Kingdom:
  - National Curriculum for England, in force in part since 2014 and in full since 2016
  - Northern Ireland Curriculum
  - Curriculum for Excellence in Scotland
  - National Curriculum for Wales (2008 to 2026), in force since 1999

The United States notably does not have one. The establishment of a national curriculum was explicitly banned in 1965, in Section 604 of the Elementary and Secondary Education Act (since moved to Section 2302 and codified at 20 U.S.C. § 6692). This act provided federal funding for primary and secondary education ('Title I funding') as part of President Lyndon B. Johnson's War on Poverty. However, most states in the United States voluntarily abide by the Common Core State Standards Initiative, which provides certain uniform standards. See Education in the United States.

== See also ==
- Bias in curricula
- Single national curriculum controversy (Pakistan)
- Textbook controversies (disambiguation)
