= Ben-Amos =

Ben-Amos (Hebrew: בן-עמוס) is a Jewish patronymic surname meaning "son of Amos". Notable people with the surname include:

- Abadjah Ben Amos or Solomon Steinheim, German physician, poet, and philosopher
- Avner Ben-Amos (born 1951), Israeli professor of history
- Dan Ben-Amos (1934–2023), Folklorist
- Ilana Krausman Ben-Amos (born 1949), Israeli historian
