= Textbooks in Israel =

Textbooks in Israel are published in Israel by the Ministry of Education of Israel and other educational institutions.

== History ==
Israel's Compulsory Education Law provides free and compulsory education for all children between the ages of 5 and 18, from the last year of kindergarten up to 12th grade.

== Assessments of Hebrew textbooks in relation to their depiction of Arabs ==
=== Center for Monitoring the Impact of Peace findings ===
An analysis of Israeli textbooks in 2000 by the Center for Monitoring the Impact of Peace (CMIP), now known as the Institute for Monitoring Peace and Cultural Tolerance in School Education, found that the legitimacy of the State of Israel as an independent Jewish state on the territory of the Land of Israel and the immigration of Jews to the country was never questioned. There was no indoctrination against the Arabs as a nation, nor a negative presentation of Islam. Islam, Arab culture and the Arabs' contribution to human civilization were presented in a positive light. No book called for violence or war. Many books express the yearning for peace between Israel and the Arab countries.

In textbooks for state-run schools, there was an effort to remove stereotypes and educate towards tolerance. In some textbooks for the Orthodox Jewish community, the researchers found derogatory adjectives, prejudices, patronizing expressions and disrespect toward Arabs. The Arab leadership was portrayed as motivated by an eternal hatred independent of historical circumstances. In textbooks for every age, Israel's wars are described as justified wars of defense, and the Arabs held responsible for them. The Palestinian exodus is attributed to the fact that the Arabs fled from their homes. Only a few textbooks stated that some refugees were expelled by Israel or were forced to flee through threats. Some do not mention the Palestinian exodus at all.

According to the report, Islam is described with respect in both the general the religious state-run educational streams. Many books elaborate in detail how Muhammad established Islam and explain its fundamentals in a factual, objective manner. Many books highlight positive aspects in Islam. The language is factual and devoid of offensive terms and stereotypes. Sites holy to both Jews and Muslims are not presented as exclusively Jewish and the Arabs' attachment to these sites is taught. The students are even taught about the Muslims affinity to Jerusalem, although, the focus is on the religious, rather than the political dimension. The CIMP report found that it was only in the ultra-orthodox stream that textbooks contained prejudice, patronizing expressions and disrespect to Arabs.

The report further stated that in textbooks of both the general state-run network and the religious state-run network, there was a genuine effort to remove stereotypes and to build a foundation for coexistence and mutual respect between the two peoples. There are many stories that describe friendships between Jews and Arabs in Islamic countries and in Israel even in times of war. There are stories of Jews helping Arabs in daily life and in war as well as stories of Arabs rescuing Jews from physical harm and helping Jews to maintain their religion and identity. In many literary anthologies there are stories about the daily life of Arabs written by Arab authors. Some stories deal with the tensions created by the transition from a traditional society with its values and customs, to a modern western society. In some books in the ultra-orthodox network relations between Arabs and Jews were portrayed in negative terms. The official list of textbooks referred to is not compulsory, but was an indication of the Ministry of Education's recommendations, as published in a memo signed by the Ministry's Director.

2001 update

CMIP states that no negative changes were noted in the new textbooks with regard to the image of the Arabs, the description of the conflict, the presentation of Islam, questions of war and peace and education to tolerance and conciliation. On the contrary, the positive trends noted in the earlier report were strengthened. The textbooks of the ultra-Orthodox schools continued to use language conveying an air of superiority.

Maps of Israel included all the territory between the Mediterranean Sea and the River Jordan. Many textbooks showed maps of the Middle East on which only Israel's name appeared, with the territories of the surrounding Arab countries left blank.

=== Other assessments ===
In his 2004 article "The Arab Image in Hebrew School Textbooks", Dan Bar-Tal of Tel Aviv University studied 124 textbooks used in Israeli schools. He concluded that generations of Israeli Jews have been taught a negative and often delegitimizing view of Arabs. He claims Arabs are portrayed in these textbooks as primitive, inferior in comparison to Jews, violent, untrustworthy, fanatic, treacherous and aggressive. While history books in the elementary schools hardly mentioned Arabs, the high school textbooks that covered the Arab–Jewish conflict stereotyped Arabs negatively, as intransigent and uncompromising.

Nurit Peled-Elhanan, a professor of language and education at the Hebrew University of Jerusalem, published Palestine in Israeli School Books: Ideology and Propaganda in Education, an account of her study of the contents of Israeli school books. She asserts that the books promote racism against and negative images of Arabs, and that they prepare young Israelis for their compulsory military service. After examining "hundreds and hundreds" of books, Peled-Elhanan claims she did not find one photograph that depicted an Arab as a "normal person". She has stated that the most important finding in the books she studied concerns the historical narrative of events in 1948, the year in which Israel fought a war to establish itself as an independent state. She claims that the killing of Palestinians is depicted as something that was necessary for the survival of the nascent Jewish state. "It's not that the massacres are denied, they are represented in Israeli school books as something that in the long run was good for the Jewish state." "[T]he Israeli version of events are stated as objective facts, while the Palestinian-Arab versions are stated as possibility, realized in openings such as 'According to the Arab version' ... [or] 'Deir Yassin [sic.] became a myth in the Palestinian narrative ... a horrifying negative image of the Jewish conqueror in the eyes of Israel's Arabs'.

With reference to previous studies of Israeli school textbooks, Peled-Elhanan states that, despite some signs of improvement in the 1990s, the more recent books do not ignore, but justify, issues such as the Nakba. For example, in all the books mentioning Deir Yassin, the massacre is justified because: "the slaughter of friendly Palestinians brought about the flight of other Palestinians which enabled the establishment of a coherent Jewish state."

She also states that contrary to the hope of previous studies "for 'the appearance of a new narrative in [Israeli] history textbooks' ... some of the most recent school books (2003–09) regress to the 'first generation' [1950s] accounts — when archival information was less accessible — and are, like them 'replete with bias, prejudice, errors, [and] misrepresentations'" (Palestine in Israeli School Books, p. 228).

In 2013, it was reported that Israeli science textbook publishers had been instructed to remove details of "human reproduction, pregnancy prevention and sexually transmitted diseases from science textbooks used in state religious junior high schools as well as from their teacher manuals".

== Assessments of Arabic textbooks ==
According to a 2011 report by the Arab Cultural Association, Arabic textbooks provided to third grade to ninth grade students in Israeli schools contained at least 16,255 mistakes. The report was based on a study and examination of textbooks in all subjects by a committee, headed by Dr. Elias Atallah. Association director Dr. Rawda Atallah said the findings were not surprising, since they were similar to the findings of a previous study published in November 2009, which reported that more than 4,000 mistakes in language and syntax were found in textbooks for second grade students in Arab schools. Researchers also spoke about the way in which Arab students' cultural and national identities are covered. For example, while textbooks state that Jews and non-Jews live in the Galilee, the word "Arab" is never mentioned. Dr. George Mansour, who examined the history textbooks, reported that they ignored the presence of the Arab-Palestinian people in Israel and stressed the Promised Land of the Jewish people: "There is a process of de-Palestinization, instilling of the Zionist narrative and minimizing of Arab culture," reported Dr. Mansour.

== Teaching the Arab–Israeli conflict ==
In general, the Israeli occupation of Palestinian territories is hardly mentioned by Israeli textbooks or by high school matriculation examinations, according to a study by Professor Avner Ben-Amos of Tel Aviv University. The lives and perspectives of Palestinians are rarely mentioned, an approach he terms “interpretive denial.” In most Israeli textbooks, “the Jewish control and the Palestinians’ inferior status appear as a natural, self-evident situation that one doesn’t have to think about."

According to the Ben-Amos study, one of the main civics textbooks used in Israeli high schools fails to address at all the limited rights of the millions of Palestinians living in the West Bank under Israeli military occupation. The more general issue of the occupation was addressed in a previous edition of this textbook but the Israeli debate regarding the occupation was shrunk to a few sentences in the most recent edition under right-wing education ministers. Another Israeli civics textbook completely omits discussion of the dispute over the occupied territories. In civics high school matriculation tests over the past 20 years, no question appeared on the limiting of the Palestinians’ rights. The geography matriculation exams ignore the Green Line and the Palestinians.

=== Nakba terminology ===
Israel has ordered the word Nakba to be removed from Israeli Arab textbooks. The term was introduced in books for use in Arab schools in 2007 when the Education Ministry was run by Yuli Tamir of the Labour party. Israeli Prime Minister Benjamin Netanyahu justified the ban by saying that the term was "propaganda against Israel".

The book "Nationalism: Building a State in the Middle East," published by the Zalman Shazar Center, was approved for 11th and 12th classrooms by Israel's Ministry of Education and distributed to shops throughout the country for use in high schools. However, the Minister of Education instructed that the contents of the book be reexamined. The Ministry of Education took the unusual step of removing the book from the shelves and then redacted it. Among other changes, term "ethnic cleansing" in relation to the Nakba was removed and now refers instead to an organized policy of expulsion by the pre-state Jewish militia.

In the past decade, there has been a significant shift within the Israeli education system regarding the representation of the Nakba. The concept has become increasingly present in textbooks and official educational materials across Jewish education systems. At the same time, as the Nakba gains more prominence in the Israeli education system, the differences between State Secular and State Religious Education (which serves the Religious Zionist public) have become more pronounced. While the secular education system presents a more nuanced and complex perspective on the Nakba, the religious state education system continues to maintain views that unambiguously justify it.

== See also ==
- Bias in education
- Institute for Monitoring Peace and Cultural Tolerance in School Education
- Textbooks in the Israeli–Palestinian conflict
- Saudi textbooks
- Anti-Arabism in Israel
- Education in Israel
