= Saudi Arabian textbook controversy =

Controversy over the content of Saudi Arabian school textbooks

Following the September 11 attacks attacks and the revelation that the leader of the organization (Osama bin Laden) and 15 of the 19 hijackers involved in the attacks, were Saudis, concern was expressed in the U.S. over "what role" the Saudi educational system "played in shaping the beliefs of Osama bin Laden's followers". Among the passages found in one 10th-grade Saudi textbook on Monotheism included: "The Hour will not come until Muslims will fight the Jews, and Muslims will kill all the Jews." This was a reference to volume four of Sahih Hadith Bukhari 52:177. Another work (M. H. Shakir's translation of the Holy Qur'an) in a discussion of the early Muslims attacks on the Ibn Nadhir tribe, stated: "It's allowed to demolish, burn or destroy the bastions of the Kuffar (infidels) - and all what constitutes their shield from Muslims if that was for the sake of victory for the Muslims and the defeat for the Kuffar".

The American government called on Saudi Arabia to reform its educational curriculum, including textbooks in Saudi schools and distributed worldwide, by reviewing and revising educational materials and eliminating any that spread "intolerance and hatred" towards Christians and Jews and promoted holy war against "unbelievers."

Some Saudis vigorously opposed changes. Saleh Al-Fawzan, the author of the textbook on monotheism and "one of the staunchest religious conservatives in the education system", wrote in a February 11, 2002 article in the Qatari newspaper Al Jazeera:

"The Jews and Christians and the polytheists have shown their heartfelt hatred and try to prevent us from the true path of God. They want to change our religion and our teaching to disconnect us from Islam so they can come and occupy us with their armies. It is bad enough when it comes from the infidels, but worse when they are of our skin. They say we create parrots, but they are the real parrots repeating what our enemies say of Islam."

By 2006, senior Saudi officials assured the United States that the reform was completed, but an investigation of twelve Saudi Ministry of Education religion textbooks by the human-rights group Freedom House suggested otherwise. Saudi officials have tried to convince Washington that the educational curriculum has been reformed. On a speaking tour of American cities, the Saudi ambassador to the United States, Prince Turki bin Faisal, told audiences that the Kingdom has eliminated what might be perceived as intolerance from its old textbooks.

In November 2010, the BBC's investigative program Panorama reported that Saudi national textbooks advocating antisemitism and violence against homosexuals were still in use in weekend religious programs in the United Kingdom.

In October 2012, Robert Bernstein, who founded Human Rights Watch, serves as a chairman of Advancing Human Rights, and was a former chairman and CEO of Random House, and various other book publishers, expressed their "profound disappointment that the Saudi government continues to print textbooks inciting hatred and violence against religious minorities." They gave an example of an 8th grade textbook which writes, "The Apes are the people of the Sabbath, the Jews; and the Swine are the infidels of the communion of Jesus, the Christians." The publishers explained that "hate speech is the precursor to genocide. First you get to hate and then you kill."

According to the Anti-Defamation League's November 2018 report, Saudi government-published school textbooks for the 2018-19 academic year promoting incitement to hatred or violence against Jews, Christians, women, and homosexual men, despite the kingdom’s claims to the contrary. One of the examples read, "The hour will not come until Muslims fight the Jews, so that the Muslims kill them, until the Jew hides behind rock and tree, so the rock or the tree says: 'Oh Muslim, oh servant of God, this Jew is behind me, so kill him.'" Another passage also suggested that "beating [women] is permitted when necessary."

In 2019, lessons alleging there were Jewish plans for world domination, and that men are in charge of women, saying disobedient wives must be struck by their husbands were removed. A seventh-grade textbook added a cartoon featuring a smiling woman saying "I think adding material on economics in the course is a positive thing" with a man named Ahmad responding "What is this opinion? Who are you to express such an opinion!", with the question being "What is noteworthy in Ahmad's answer?", encouraging students to criticize his response. However, the textbooks still emphasized women's subservience to men, and the demonization of Jews, non-Muslims, and gays.

In 2021, it was reported that Saudi textbooks had changed with removals of a section supporting capital punishment for homosexuality and apostasy, and the removal of a passage attributing the quote "The [Day of Judgement] will not come until Muslims fight the Jews, and the Muslims will kill them [all]" to Muhammad. However, not all antisemitic passages have been removed, with it mentioning a story of Jews who converted to Islam, saying they would've gone to Jahannam had they not converted. A passage about God changing a group of Jews into "real monkeys" also remained in the textbooks. Opposition to Shia and Sufi traditions (including visiting the graves of prominent religious figures, tawassul, kneeling to anyone other than Allah, building mosques on top of graves, and wailing over the dead) remained, labeling them as shirk, saying it will be punished by a cancellation of good deeds, rejection of repentance, and eternal damnation. It also explicitly says Sunni Islam represents the "true Islam, both in theory and practice", with all students, regardless of religion being required to use this curriculum, with any signs of protest leading to a reduction in grades.

In 2022, several references relating to opposition to Israel and the Israeli–Palestinian conflict were removed. A lesson on patriotic poetry removed an example of "opposing the Jewish settlement in Palestine", a high school textbook removed a section describing positive effects of the First Intifada, and one textbook removed an entire chapter relating to the Palestinian cause. The terms "Israeli enemy" and "Zionist enemy" were replaced with "the Israeli occupation" and "the Israeli occupation army". There continues to be no mention of The Holocaust in textbooks.

== See also ==
- Bias in education
- Textbooks in Israel
- Textbooks in the Israeli–Palestinian conflict
- Pakistan studies/Pakistani textbooks controversy
- Institute for Monitoring Peace and Cultural Tolerance in School Education
