= Creationism by country =

This article presents an overview of creationism by country.

== Africa ==
=== Kenya ===
In 2006 the Pentecostal church, led by Bishop Boniface Adoyo, launched a campaign to give less prominence to fossilised human bones displayed in the National Museum. These fossils, discovered by Richard Leakey in the Great Rift Valley region, are documented by science as remains of the earliest known human beings. Kenyan evangelical Christians have disputed the significance of those discoveries. Leakey and Bishop Adoyo were interviewed by Richard Dawkins for his The Genius of Charles Darwin series.

=== South Africa ===
A 2011 Ipsos survey found that 56% of responders in South Africa identified themselves as “creationists and believe that human beings were in fact created by a spiritual force such as the God they believe in and do not believe that the origin of man came from evolving from other species such as apes”.

== Americas ==
=== Brazil ===
Brazil has had two creationist societies since the 1970s—the Brazilian Association for Creation Research and the Brazilian Creation Society. According to a 2004 survey, 41% of Brazil believe that "the first humans were created no more than 10,000 years ago."

A 2011 Ipsos survey found that 47% of responders in Brazil identified themselves as “creationists and believe that human beings were in fact created by a spiritual force such as the God they believe in and do not believe that the origin of man came from evolving from other species such as apes”.

=== United States ===
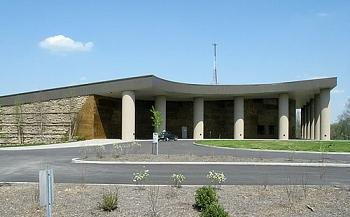
The Creation Museum is a young Earth creationism museum run by Answers in Genesis (AiG) in Petersburg, Kentucky.

In the US some religious communities have refused to accept naturalistic explanations and tried to counter them. The term started to become associated with Christian fundamentalist opposition to human evolution and belief in a young Earth in 1929. Several US states passed laws against the teaching of evolution in public schools, as upheld in the Scopes Trial. Evolution was omitted entirely from school textbooks in most of the US until the 1960s. Since then, renewed efforts to introduce teaching creationism in American public schools in the form of Flood geology, creation science, and intelligent design have been consistently held to contravene the constitutional separation of church and state by a succession of legal judgments. The meaning of the term creationism was contested, but by the 1980s it had been co-opted by proponents of creation science and Flood geology.

Most of the anti-evolutionists of the 1920s believed in forms of old Earth creationism, which accepts geological findings and other methods of dating the Earth and believes that these findings do not contradict the Book of Genesis, but rejects evolution. At that time only a minority held to young Earth creationism, proponents of which believe that the Earth is thousands rather than billions of years old, and typically believe that the days in chapter one of the Book of Genesis are 24 hours in length. In the 1960s, this became the most prominent form of anti-evolution. From the 1860s forms of theistic evolution had developed; this term refers to beliefs in creation which are compatible with the scientific view of evolution and the age of the Earth, as held by mainstream Christian denominations. There are other religious people who support creationism, but in terms of allegorical interpretations of the Book of Genesis.

By the start of the 20th century, evolution was widely accepted and was beginning to be taught in American public schools. After World War I, popular belief that German aggression resulted from a Darwinian doctrine of "survival of the fittest" inspired William Jennings Bryan to campaign against the teaching of Darwinian ideas of human evolution. In the 1920s, the Fundamentalist–Modernist Controversy led to an upsurge of fundamentalist religious fervor in which schools were prevented from teaching evolution through state laws such as Tennessee's 1925 Butler Act, and by getting evolution removed from biology textbooks nationwide. Creationism became associated in common usage with opposition to evolution.

In 1961 in the US, an attempt to repeal the Butler Act failed. The Genesis Flood by Henry M. Morris brought the Seventh-day Adventist biblically literal Flood geology of George McCready Price to a wider audience, popularizing the idea of young Earth creationism, and by 1965 the term "scientific creationism" had gained currency. The 1968 Epperson v. Arkansas judgment ruled that state laws prohibiting the teaching of evolution violate the Establishment Clause of the First Amendment to the United States Constitution which prohibits state aid to religion, and when in 1975 Daniel v. Waters ruled that a state law requiring biology textbooks discussing "origins or creation of man and his world" to give equal treatment to creation as per the Book of Genesis was unconstitutional, a new group identifying themselves as creationists promoted 'creation science' which omitted explicit biblical references.

In 1981, the state of Arkansas passed a law, Act 590, mandating that "creation science" be given equal time in public schools with evolution, and defining creation science as positing the "creation of the universe, energy, and life from nothing," as well as explaining the Earth's geology by "the occurrence of a worldwide flood." This was ruled unconstitutional at McLean v. Arkansas in January 1982 as the creationists' methods were not scientific but took the literal wording of the Book of Genesis and attempted to find scientific support for it. Louisiana introduced similar legislation that year. A series of judgments and appeals led to the 1987 Supreme Court ruling in Edwards v. Aguillard that it too violated the Establishment Clause of the First Amendment to the United States Constitution.

"Creation science" could no longer be taught in public schools, and in drafts of the creation science school textbook Of Pandas and People all references to creation or creationism were changed to refer to intelligent design. Proponents of the intelligent design movement organised widespread campaigning to considerable effect. They officially denied any links to creation or religion, and claimed that "creationism" only referred to young Earth creationism with Flood geology; but in Kitzmiller v. Dover the court found intelligent design to be religious, and unable to dissociate itself from its creationist roots, as part of the ruling that teaching intelligent design in public school science classes was unconstitutional.

The percentage of people in the US who accept the idea of human evolution declined from 45% in 1985 to 40% in 2005, while the percentage of people who reject evolution also declined from 48% to 39%. A Gallup poll reported that the percentage of people in the US who believe in a strict interpretation of creationism had fallen to 40% in 2010 after a high of 46% in 2006. However, the percentage rose back to 46% in 2012. The highest the percentage has risen between 1982 and 2010 was 47% in 1994 and 2000 according to the report. Gallup's survey indicated that belief in creationism has been relatively stable, although it has declined slightly in recent years. Its most recent poll found that 40% of Americans believe in creationism. The report found that Americans who are less educated are more likely to hold a creationist view while those with a college education are more likely to hold a view involving evolution. 47% of those with no more than a high school education believe in creationism while 22% of those with a post graduate education hold that view. The poll also found that church attendance dramatically increased adherence to a strict creationist view (22% for those who do not attend church, 60% for those who attend weekly). The higher percentage of Republicans who identified with a creationist view is described as evidence of the strong relationship between religion and politics as the U.S. Republicans also attend church weekly more than Democratic or independent voters. Non-Republican voters are twice as likely to hold a nontheistic view of evolution than Republican voters.

Among US states, acceptance of evolution has a strong negative correlation with religiosity and a strong positive relationship with science degrees awarded, bachelor's degree attainment, advanced degree attainment, average teacher salary, and GDP per capita. In other words, states in which more people say that religion is very important to their lives tend to show less acceptance of evolution. The better the education of individuals, their educational system, or the higher their income, the more they accept evolution, though the US as a country has a comparatively well educated population but lower acceptance of evolution than other countries.

== Asia ==
=== South Korea ===
Since 1981, the Korea Association for Creation Research has grown to 16 branches, with 1000 members and 500 Ph.Ds. On August 22–24, 1991, recognizing the 10th anniversary of KACR, an International Symposium on Creation Science was held with 4,000 in attendance. In 1990, the book The Natural Sciences was written by Young-Gil Kim and 26 other fellow scientists in Korea with a creationist viewpoint. The textbook drew the interest of college communities, and today, many South Korean universities are using it.

Since 1991, creation science has become a regular university course at Myongji University, which has a centre for creation research. Since that time, other universities have begun to offer creation science courses. At Handong Global University, creationist Young-Gil Kim was inaugurated as president in March 1995. At Myongji University, creationist Woongsang Lee is a biology professor. The Korea Advanced Institute of Science and Technology is where the Research Association of Creation Science was founded and many graduate students are actively involved. In 2008, a survey found that 36% of South Koreans disagreed with the statement that "Human beings, as we know them today, developed from earlier species of animals." In May 2012, publishers of high school science textbooks decided to remove references to evolution following a petition by a creationist group. However, the ensuing controversy prompted the government to appoint a panel of scientists to look into the matter, and the government urged the publishers to keep the references to evolution following the recommendation of the panel.

== Australia ==
In the late 1970s, Answers in Genesis, a creationist research organization, was founded in Australia. In 1994, Answers in Genesis expanded from Australia to the US. It subsequently expanded into the UK, Canada, South Africa and New Zealand. Creationists in Australia have been the leading influence on the development of creation science in the US for the last 20 years. Two of the three main international creation science organizations all have original roots within Australia – Answers in Genesis and Creation Ministries.

In 1980, the Queensland state government of Joh Bjelke-Petersen allowed the teaching of creationism as science to school children. On May 29, 2010, it was announced that creationism and intelligent design will be discussed in history classes as part of the new national curriculum. It will be placed in the subject of ancient history, under the topic of "controversies."

Ian Plimer, an anti-creationist geologist, reported being attacked by creationists. A few public lectures have been given in rented rooms at universities, by visiting American speakers, and speakers with doctorates purchased by mail from Florida sites. A court case claimed by Plimer to have been taken by him against prominent creationists found, according to him, "that the creationists had stolen the work of others for financial profit, that the creationists told lies under oath and that the creationists were engaged in fraud." The debate was featured on the science television program Quantum. In 1989, Plimer debated American creationist Duane Gish.

== Europe ==
In recent years the teaching of creationism has become a subject of debate in a variety of countries including Germany, the UK, Italy, the Netherlands, Poland, and Serbia.

Creation "science" has been heavily promoted in immigrant communities in Western Europe, primarily by Turkish Islamic creationist Adnan Oktar. On October 4, 2007, the Parliamentary Assembly of the Council of Europe adopted The dangers of creationism in education, a resolution on the attempt by American-inspired creationists to promote creationism in European schools. It concludes "The war on the theory of evolution and on its proponents most often originates in forms of religious extremism closely linked to extreme right-wing political movements... some advocates of strict creationism are out to replace democracy by theocracy... If we are not careful, the values that are the very essence of the Council of Europe will be under direct threat from creationist fundamentalists."

=== France ===
A 2011 poll conducted by global research company Ipsos for Reuters found that 55% of French considered themselves as 'evolutionists' ("believe that human beings were in fact created over a long period of time of evolution growing into fully formed human beings they are today from lower species such as apes"), 36% don't know what to believe ("sometimes agree or disagree with theories and ideas put forward by both creationists and evolutionists"), and 9% considered themselves as 'creationists' ("believe that human beings were in fact created by a spiritual force such as the God they believe in and do not believe that the origin of man came from evolving from other species such as apes").

=== Germany ===
The board of the federation of Protestant Churches in Germany, the Rat der EKD clearly rejects both creationism and intelligent design from a theological standpoint. It refers to both Calvin and Luther as proponents of a creatio continua, an ongoing creation. EKD stands as well for an intense and fruitful exchange between churches, science and theology in the general public and on university level. Germany has a longstanding tradition of religious education in public (state funded) schools, starting with the Prussian education system in the 18th century.

In 1978, British chemist A. E. Wilder-Smith, who came to Germany after World War II and lectured at Marburg and other cities, published a book arguing against evolution, The Natural Sciences Know Nothing of Evolution (1978). At the end of the year Horst W. Beck became a creationist. Both an engineer and theologian, he was a leading figure in the Karl-Heim-Gesellschaft (Karl Heim Society) and had previously published articles and books defending theistic evolution. Together with other members of the society, which they soon left, he followed the arguments of Willem Ouweneel, a Dutch biologist lecturing in Germany. Beck soon found other scientists who had changed their view or were "hidden" creationists. Under his leadership, the first creationist society was founded, Wort und Wissen—lit. "Word and Knowledge". Three book series were soon published, an independent creationist monthly journal started (Factum), and the first German article in the Creation Research Society Quarterly was published.

In 2006, a documentary on Arte television network, Von Göttern und Designern ("Genesis vs. Darwin") by filmmaker Frank Papenbroock, demonstrated that creationism had already been taught in biology classes in at least two schools in Giessen, Hesse, without this being noticed. During this, the Education Minister of Hessen, Karin Wolff, said she believed creationism should be taught in biology class as a theory, like the theory of evolution: "I think it makes sense to bring up multidisciplinary and interdisciplinary problems for discussion." In 2009, an article on the German news site Spiegel Online stated approximately 20% of people disbelieve evolutionary theory in Germany. More recently, a 2011 Ipsos poll commissioned by Reuters found 12% of Germans identify as creationists.

=== Romania ===
In Romania, in 2002, the Ministry of Education approved the use of a biology book endorsing creationism, titled Biologie clasa a IX-a – Măiestrie şi strălucire divină în biosferă ("Biology Class IX – Divine Mastery and Brilliance in the Biosphere"), in public high schools. Following a protest of the Romanian Humanist Association the Romanian Ministry of Education replied that the book is not a "textbook" but merely an "accessory." The president of the Association labelled the reply as "disappointing" since, whether a textbook or an accessory, the book remains available for usage in schools. Reports indicate that at least one teacher in Oradea did use the book.

=== Serbia ===
On September 7, 2004, the Serbian Minister for Education and Sport, Ljiljana Čolić, temporarily banned evolution from being taught in the country. After statewide outcry she resigned on September 16, 2004, from her post.

=== Switzerland ===
A 2006 international survey found that 30% of the Swiss reject evolution, one of the highest national percentages in Europe. Another survey in 2007, commissioned by the Christian organization Pro Genesis, controversially claims 80% of Swiss want creationism taught alongside evolution in biology class. This resulted in schools in the Canton of Bern printing science textbooks that presented creationism as a valid alternative theory to evolution. Scientists and education experts harshly criticized the move, which quickly prompted school authorities to revise the books.

=== United Kingdom ===
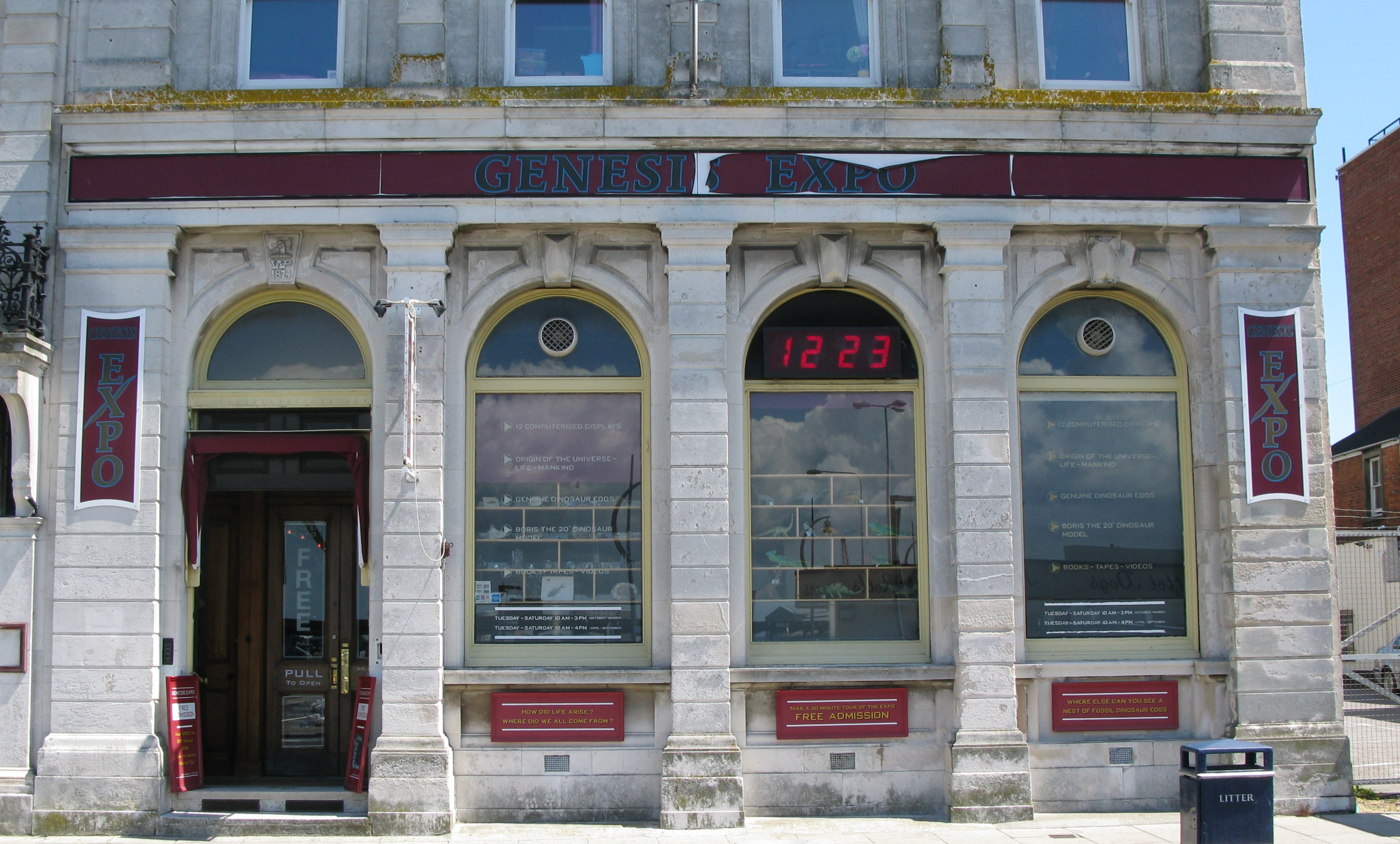
The Genesis Expo is a young Earth creationism museum in Portsmouth, England.

Since the development of evolutionary theory by Charles Darwin in England, where his portrait appears on the back of the revised Series E £10 note issued in 2000, significant shifts in British public opinion have occurred. A 2006 survey for the BBC showed that "more than a fifth of those polled were convinced by the creationist argument," a massive decrease from the almost total acceptance of creationism before Darwin published his theory. A 2010 Angus Reid poll found that "In Britain, two-thirds of respondents (68%) side with evolution while less than one-in-five (16%) choose creationism. At least seven-in-ten respondents in the South of England (70%) and Scotland (75%) believe human beings evolved from less advanced life forms over millions of years." A subsequent 2010 YouGov poll on the origin of humans found that 9% opted for creationism, 12% intelligent design, 65% evolutionary theory and 13% did not know.

Speaking at the British Science Association's British Science Festival at the University of Liverpool in 2008, Michael Reiss estimated that about only 10% of children were from a family that supported a creationist rather than evolutionary viewpoint. Richard Dawkins has been quoted saying "I have spoken to a lot of science teachers in schools here in Britain who are finding an increasing number of students coming to them and saying they are Young Earth creationists."

The director of education at the Royal Society has said that creationism should be discussed in school science lessons, rather than be excluded, to explain why creationism had no scientific basis. Wales has the largest proportion of theistic evolutionists—the belief that evolution is part of God's plan (38%). Northern Ireland has the highest proportion of people who believe in 'intelligent design' (16%), which holds that "certain features of the universe and of living things are best explained by an intelligent cause, not an undirected process such as natural selection." Some private religious schools in the UK teach creationism rather than evolution. The British Humanist Association and leading scientists campaigned to make creationism illegal in state funded schools from 2011 onwards. In 2014 they achieved their goal when the Department for Education updated the funding contracts of Academies and Free Schools to this effect, and at the same time, clarified that creationism being taught as science contravened existing 'British values' requirements.

== Muslim world ==
A 2007 study of religious patterns found that only 8% of Egyptians, 11% of Malaysians, 14% of Pakistanis and 16% of Indonesians agree that Darwin's theory is probably or most certainly true, and a 2006 survey reported that about a quarter of Turkish adults agreed that human beings evolved from earlier animal species. Surveys carried out by researchers affiliated with McGill University's Evolution Education Research Centre found that in Egypt and Pakistan, while the official high school curriculum does include evolution, many of the teachers there do not believe in it themselves, and will often tell their students so.

Currently in Egypt, evolution is taught in schools but Saudi Arabia and Sudan have both banned the teaching of evolution in schools. In recent times, creationism has become more widespread in other Islamic countries.

The results of a survey of the adherence to creation science of 5,700 teachers from 14 countries was presented during the 2008 XIII IOSTE Symposium in İzmir, Turkey. Lebanon, Jordan, Tunisia, Morocco and Algeria had 62% to 81% of creationist teachers (with no difference between biologists and others). Romania and Burkina Faso had 45% to 48% of creationist teachers, with no difference between biologists and other in Romania, but a clear difference (p<0.001) in Burkina Faso (with 61% of creationists for the not biology teachers). Portugal and Cyprus had 15% to 30% of creationist teachers, with no significant difference between biologists, but a significant difference in Portugal (p=0.004, 17% and 26%).

=== Iran ===
Iranian scientific development, especially the health-related aspects of biology, has been a goal of the Islamic government since the revolution of 1979. Since Iranian traditional practice of Shi'a religion is not preoccupied with Qur'anic literalism as in case of Saudi Wahhabism but ijtihad, many influential Iranian Shi'ite scholars, including several who were closely involved in Iranian Revolution, are not opposed to evolutionary ideas in general, disagreeing that evolution necessarily conflicts with the Muslim mainstream. Iranian pupils, since 5th grade of elementary school, learn only about evolution, thus portraying geologists and scientists in general as authoritative voices of scientific knowledge.

=== Turkey ===
Following the 1980 Turkish coup d'état, the military leadership and subsequent governments promoted Islamism to promote national unity, which eventually included translation and distribution of materials from the US Institute for Creation Research and creationist high-school textbooks. A survey published in 2008 found that about 25% of people in Turkey accepted evolution as an explanation for how life came to exist. In 2008, Richard Dawkins' website was banned in Turkey; the ban was lifted in July 2011. As of 2009, creationism had become the government's official position on origins.

In 2009, Ömer Ziya Cebeci, then vice president of the Turkish government agency Scientific and Technological Research Council of Turkey (TÜBİTAK), publisher of the popular Turkish science magazine Bilim ve Teknik (Science and Technology), was accused of removing a cover story about the life and work of Charles Darwin from the March 2009 issue of the magazine just before it went to press. The planned cover page with Darwin was replaced and the editor of the magazine, Çiğdem Atakuman, was fired from her post. The event caused protests across the country and calls for Cebeci to resign. Cebeci was removed from his position in 2011, and a court in 2013 ruled that Atakuman was unlawfully dismissed from her position as editor.

In 2012, it was found that the government's internet content filter, designed to prevent the public having access to pornographic websites, also blocked the words 'evolution' and 'Darwin' on one mode of the filter.

In 2017, Turkey announced plans to end the teaching of evolution in Turkish schools, with chairman of the Board of Education, Alpaslan Durmuş, claiming it was too complicated and "controversial" a topic for students.
