= Marcus Sheff =

- מרקוס שף
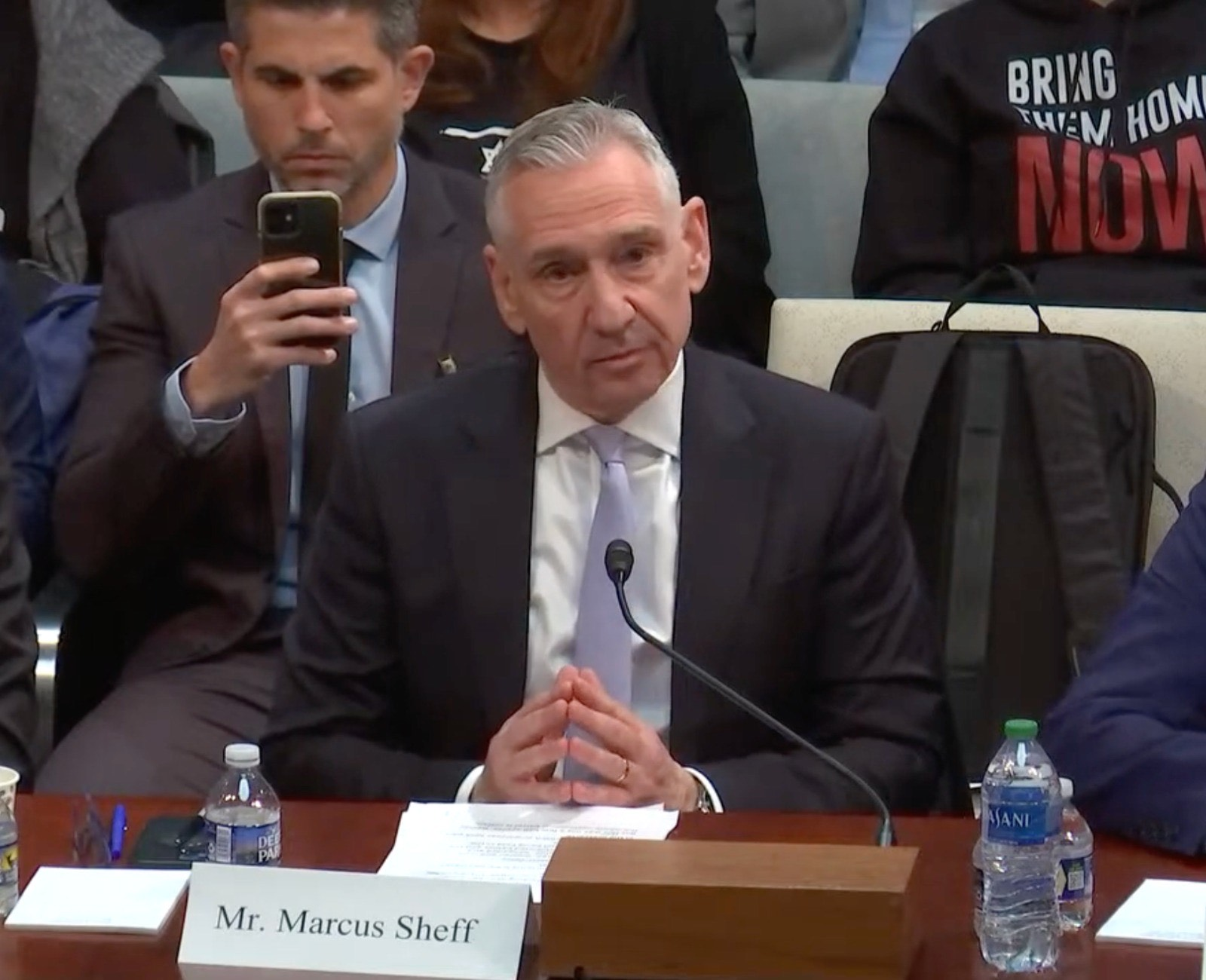
- Sheff testifying before the US Congress on the 2023 Hamas-led attack on Israel
- Born: 1963 (age 62–63); Whitefield, Manchester, United Kingdom
- Education: University of Leeds

Marcus Sheff (Hebrew: מרקוס שף; born 1963) is an Israeli-British non-profit chief executive officer (CEO), former media executive and journalist.

== Early life and education ==
Sheff was born in Whitefield, Manchester, United Kingdom in 1963 in a Jewish family. His late father, Alan, a dentist, was president of the Whitefield Hebrew Congregation. His mother, Sylvia, was a recipient of the MBE. She led a campaign to free Soviet Jews, most notable among them is Natan Sharansky.

Sheff was educated at the Prestwich Jewish Day School, now known as Yesoiday Hatorah as well as Bolton School. Later, he attended the University of Leeds and graduated with a bachelor's degree in political science and international relations. He held several posts at the student union as was elected General Secretary of Leeds University Union in 1984 and on the NUS anti-racism committee in 1985.

Sheff is married to Inbal.

== Career ==
At the age of 23 Sheff moved to Israel. There, he became involved in the political world after joining The Nation as a reporter. Later, when The Nation became defunct, he joined The Jerusalem Post and worked there for the next two years as an editor.

In 1990 Sheff co-founded strategic communications company, The Word Shop and after selling it a decade later, worked in strategic communications for global firms.

From 2007 to 2014 Sheff was the chief executive officer (CEO) of The Israel Project. Before joining the Israel Project, he was the CEO of Intermedia.

In 2020 Sheff was included in the Algemeiner Journal's Jewish 100 list.

Sheff is the current CEO of the Institute for Monitoring Peace and Cultural Tolerance in School Education (IMPACT-se). Under his tenure, IMPACE-se has submitted extensive reports which evaluate the textbook curriculum of countries around the world, particularly the Middle Eastern countries, including Saudi Arabia, the United Arab Emirates, Qatar, Yemen and the Palestinian Authority, urging them to reform their textbooks. In many instances, the suggestions were accepted, and the textbooks in question were reformed and became more moderate.

Sheff is also a major in reserves in the Israel Defense Forces (IDF) Spokesperson Unit.
