= Micah Lewensohn =

Israeli theater director and actor

- מיכה לבינסון
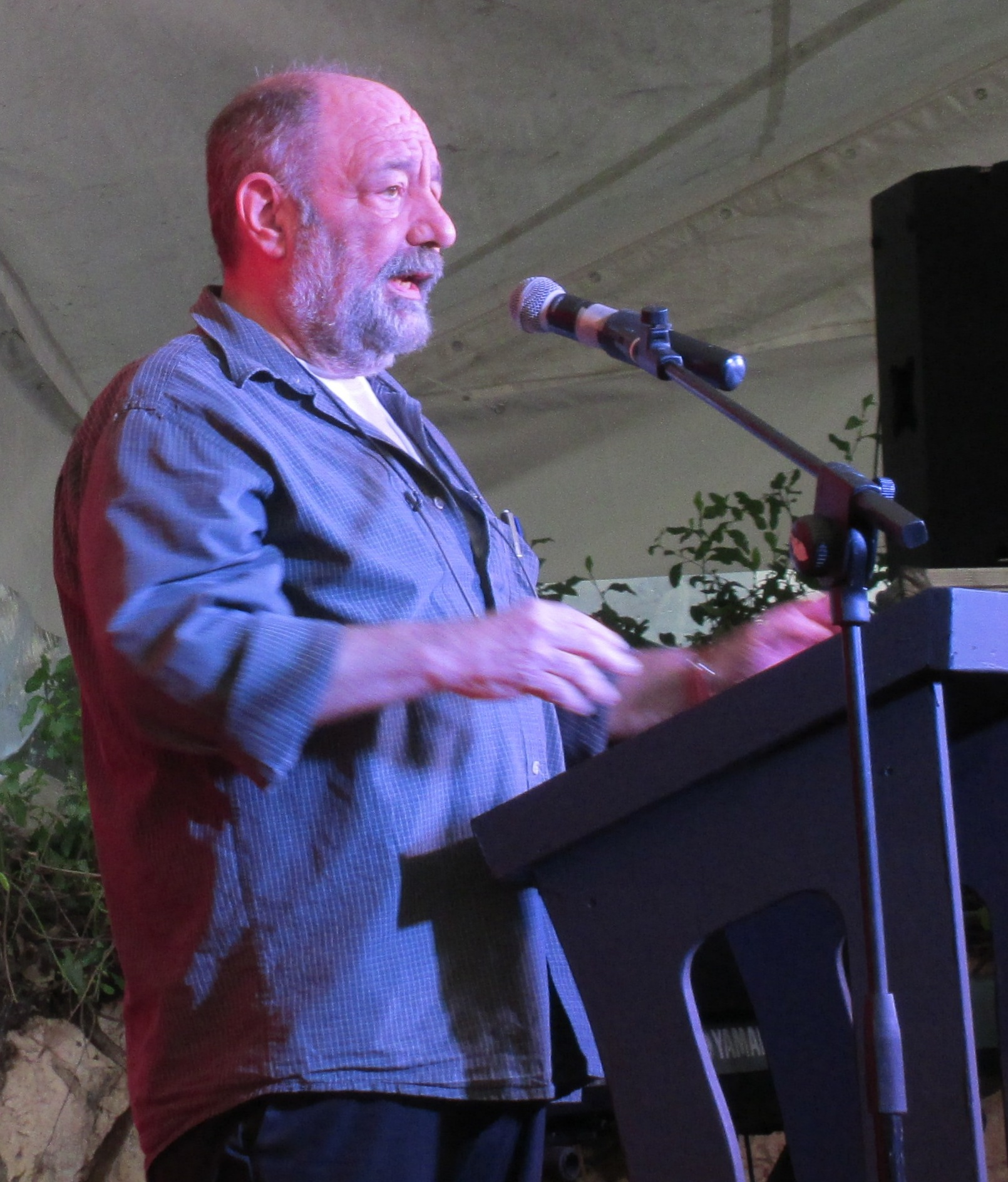
- Born: 27 August 1952; Jerusalem, Israel
- Died: 20 March 2017 (aged 64); Tel Aviv, Israel
- Occupation: Theatre director

Micah Lewensohn (Hebrew: מיכה לבינסון; 27 August 1952 – 20 March 2017) was an Israeli theater director and actor.

== Directing for the Theatre ==
- The Producers by Mel Brooks and Thomas Meehan, Cameri Theater. 2006
- The Dresser by Ronald Harwood, Cameri Theater. 2003
