= Avner Ben-Amos =

Israeli professor of history (born 1951)

- אַבְנֵר בֵּן-עָמוֹס
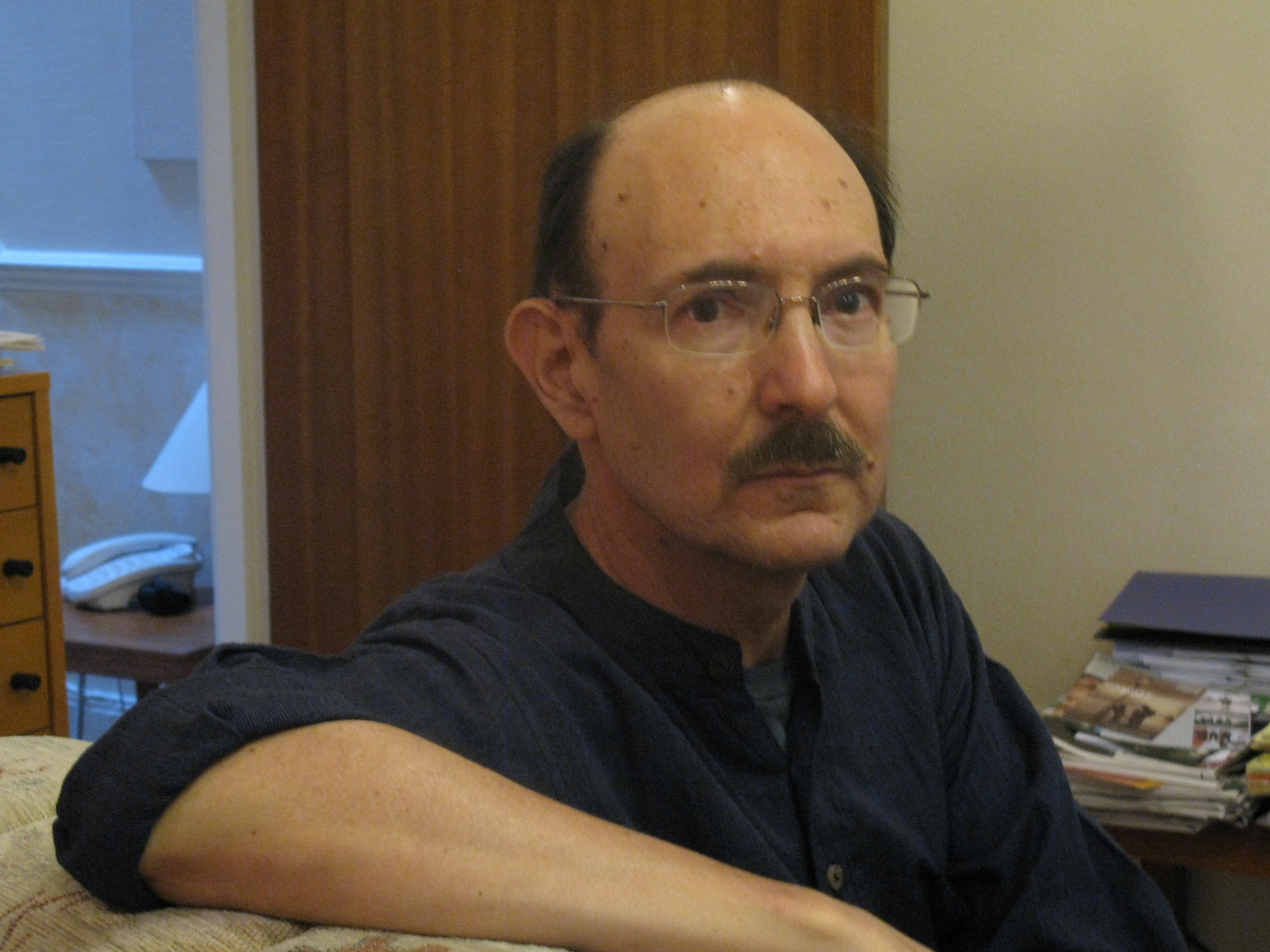
- Born: 21 August 1951 (age 75); Tel Aviv, Israel
- Occupations: Historian, academic, scholar

Academic background
- Education: Hebrew University of Jerusalem, University of California, Berkeley

Academic work
- Institutions: Tel Aviv University
- Main interests: History of political rituals and national memory in Israel and France

Avner Ben-Amos (Hebrew: אַבְנֵר בֵּן-עָמוֹס; born 1951) is an Israeli historian of education, an emeritus professor at Tel Aviv University School of Education, a playwright, and a social activist.

== Early life ==
Ben-Amos' paternal grandfather grew up in a religious Jewish house in Minsk, and later became secular. His grandmother grew up in an upper-middle-class family. They immigrated to Mandatory Palestine in 1924. Avner’s father, Emanuel Ben-Amos, served in the Palmach, lived in a kibbutz, and studied acting. Avner’s mother, Michal (Kohl) Ben-Amos, daughter of a prosperous merchant, grew up in Magdeburg, Germany. In 1939, at age 16, she immigrated to Palestine, studied Nursing, and participated in the 1948 Arab–Israeli War. In 1947, Emanuel Ben-Amos joined the Cameri Theatre and had a short-lived stardom. In 1964, he settled in New York, worked as a director of commercials, and died there in 2007.

Avner Ben-Amos was born in 1951 and raised in Tel Aviv. Avner has one younger sister, Tamar Shaptro (Ben-Amos), and a brother from his father’s second marriage. He attended Municipal High School E (Ironi Heh) in Tel Aviv and did his military service in the Israeli Intelligence Corps. Ben-Amos completed a bachelor’s degree in the Department of Theatre Studies and the History Department at the Hebrew University of Jerusalem (1973-1977) and a master’s degree (1978-1980) and a doctorate (1981-1988) in the Department of History at the University of California, Berkeley. The subject of his dissertation was "Molding the National Memory: State Funerals in the French Third Republic." His dissertation advisor was Prof. Martin Jay. The dissertation was published as a book in English by Oxford University Press and in French by the publishing house of École des hautes études en sciences sociales (the School for Advanced Studies in the Social Sciences) in Paris. During his doctoral research, he lived in Paris for several years.

== Academic career ==
In 1990, he was appointed to the faculty of the Tel Aviv University School of Education, where he worked until his retirement. He has been a lecturer and visiting scholar at the Hebrew University of Jerusalem, Ben-Gurion University of the Negev, the French National Centre for Scientific Research (CNRS), New College at the University of Oxford, Rutgers University, Maison des Sciences de l'Homme in Paris, Paris Diderot University, the UCL Institute of Education, and École des hautes études en sciences sociales in Paris.

He was a member of the Pedagogic Committee of Massuah Institute and a member of the Scientific Council of the Ghetto Fighters' House and the Eretz Israel Museum in Tel Aviv. He was a member of the expert team for the Advancement of the Humanities in the Education System under the auspices of the Israel Academy of Sciences and Humanities, and he sits on the Board of Trustees of The Israeli Institute of History Education, Kibbutzim College. He served on the editorial board of the periodicals Hagar, Écrire L'Histoire, Amnis, and Gilui Da’at (in Hebrew). He is currently on the editorial board of the periodicals Iyunim (in Hebrew) and Revue d’histoire culturelle. He has written op-eds on educational issues on the website Ha’okets and in the newspaper Haaretz, and book reviews that appeared in Haaretz and various academic journals.

== Research ==
In his research, Avner Ben-Amos focuses on the history of political rituals, the shaping of national memory, and the teaching of history and civics. The countries he studies are France and Israel.

=== Books ===
==== Funerals, Politics and Memory in Modern France, 1789-1996 ====
This book is a multidisciplinary study of state funerals in France between the French Revolution and the death of President François Mitterrand. It aims to explain how the funerals of revered figures such as Voltaire, Napoleon Bonaparte, Victor Hugo, and Charles de Gaulle became major events that drew public attention for days or even weeks and helped mold the French national memory. Ben-Amos’s explanation, which draws on insights from the fields of education, anthropology, theater, and political science, is that these were ceremonies of a dual nature: the state funeral was simultaneously a political ritual and a personal rite of passage, and each aspect reinforced the other. The result was a significant event that drew crowds of tens or hundreds of thousands to the streets and squares of Paris and, thanks to the mass media, reached a broad audience throughout France.

The book focuses on the republican tradition of state funerals, which emerged during the French Revolution, with the transformation of the Pantheon into a prestigious burial site, and continued throughout the 19th and 20th centuries, up to – and including – the era of the French Fifth Republic. Whether in power or the opposition, the Republicans used the funerals of their activists and leaders to educate the masses and mobilize public support. Such events were an inseparable part of the republican political culture, including symbols, ceremonies, slogans, songs, and holy sites, and significantly bolstered the rule of republican forces.

==== Israël: la fabrique de l’identité national (in English: Israel: The Shaping of National Identity) ====
This book examines how Zionism, as a modern national movement with educational aspirations, sought to instill its values among the Jewish public while overcoming the challenges facing it: the need to mold a population of emigrants who came from diverse cultural traditions and turn them into a united national community in an unfamiliar new-old land. In addition, the Zionist movement in Palestine operated under difficult political circumstances – initially under foreign, Ottoman, and British rule, and later while engaged in a prolonged military conflict with Arab states and the Palestinian national movement. All this led to massive investment in education, which, alongside security and settling the land, was considered a primary focus of activity by the movement and the State of Israel.

The book is divided into three parts, each addressing a different aspect of Zionist education. The first part examines schools and includes a historical introduction to the Hebrew education system, as well as an analysis of history teaching and school rituals. The second part, on the shaping of collective Israeli memory, includes a discussion of fallen soldiers’ commemoration through rituals, monuments, and print, and an analysis of the Israel Prize ceremony and the bicentennial of the French Revolution in Israel, as two educational events. The third part explores the use of visual culture for national education, focusing on illustrations in books, historical museums, and television programs. The three parts combine to form a complex picture that reveals the various ways in which the Zionist movement sought to shape both the individual and society following its national values.

== Theater ==
Ben-Amos became involved in the theater as a student at the Hebrew University. Along with Hadas Efrat, he established a puppet theater for adults named "Teatron Hakufsa" (The Box Theater), where they presented two plays: The Love of Don Perlimplín and Belisa in the Garden by Federico García Lorca and Stubborn Sarah by Avner Ben-Amos. Both plays were performed at the Jerusalem Khan Theatre in 1978. Ben-Amos adapted his play for actors and presented it at the Acco Festival of Alternative Israeli Theatre in 1986 under the direction of Michael Bodenstein.

Along with Ruth Kanner, Ben-Amos adapted Tamar Berger’s book, Dionysus at the Center, into a play. Directed by Ruth Kanner, the play was initially performed as a final project for the Department of Theatre Studies at Tel Aviv University and later at the Acco Festival and the Suzanne Dellal Centre for Dance and Theatre in 2004. Along with Mor Frank, Ben-Amos adapted the play and book He Walked through the Fields by Moshe Shamir into a play. The play was performed by the Ruth Kanner Theatre Group in 2013 at the Tel Aviv Museum of Art under the direction of Mor Frank, with performances by Ronen Babluki, Shirley Gal-Segev, Assaf Dgani, and Adi Meirovitch.

Along with stage director Micah Lewensohn and actor Dror Keren, he adapted David Grossman’s novel A Horse Walks into a Bar into a play, which the Cameri Theater performed during 2017–2023. He was a co-recipient, with Micah Lewensohn and Dror Keren, of the 2017 Playwright of the Year Award.

Ben-Amos adapted the government of Israel’s minutes from the Six-Day War and children’s letters to Haaretz Shelanu from July–August 1967 into a play titled Summer of 1967 – Read Their Lips. The play, directed by Sinai Peter, was initially performed at the Jaffa Theatre and later at the Tel Aviv Museum from 2017 to 2018. Ben-Amos adapted Hillel Cohen’s book 1929: Year Zero of the Arab-Israeli Conflict into a play titled Year Zero: 1929/Tarpat. The play, directed by Sinai Peter, was performed at the Jaffa Theatre during the years 2021–2022.

== Social activism ==
Ben-Amos was among the founders of the Negev Coexistence Forum for Civil Equality, established in 1997. The Forum, composed of Bedouin residents of the Negev and Jewish citizens from Beersheba, Omer, and local kibbutzim, aims to promote Bedouin rights in the Negev, particularly in unrecognized villages. Ben-Amos is a member of the Forum’s board of directors and among the initiators of Multaqa-Mifgash, an Arab-Jewish cultural center in Be’er Sheva. In the early 2000s, he joined the Israel section of Amnesty International and, between 2010 and 2018, was a member of its Board of Directors. Between 2014 and 2016, he was a member of the board of the Public Committee Against Torture in Israel.

== Authored books ==
- Funerals, Politics and Memory in Modern France, 1789-1996. Oxford: Oxford University Press, 2000.

Translated into French:

- Le vif saisit le mort: Funérailles, politique et mémoire en France (1789-1996). Trans. by Rachel Bouyssou. Paris: Éditions de l'EHESS, 2013.
- Israël: La fabrique de l'identité nationale. Trans. by Fabienne Bergmann. Paris: CNRS Éditions, 2010.

== Edited books ==
- Avner Ben-Amos and Yael Tamir, eds., The Teacher: Between Mission and Profession. Tel Aviv: Ramot – Tel Aviv University, 1995 (Hebrew).
- Avner Ben-Amos, ed., History, Identity and Memory: Images of the Past in Israeli Education. Tel Aviv: Ramot – Tel Aviv University, 2002 (Hebrew).
- Avner Ben-Amos and Daniel Bar-Tal, eds., Patriotism: Homeland Love. Tel Aviv: Hakibbutz Hameuhad, 2004 (Hebrew).
- Avner Ben-Amos and Ofer Shiff, eds., Our Portrait: To Study Israel, To Write about Ourselves, Sde Boker: Ben Gurion University Press, 2020 (Hebrew).
- Avner Ben-Amos and Ofri Ilany, eds. Sacred People: Bible and Nationalism in the Modern Era, Jerusalem: Carmel, 2021 (Hebrew).

== Personal life ==
Avner Ben-Amos resided for many years in Omer and currently resides in Tel Aviv. He is married to the historian Ilana Krausman Ben-Amos and has two children.
