= Homa Hoodfar =

Iranian anthropologist

Homa Hoodfar (Persian: هما هودفر) is a Canadian-Iranian sociocultural anthropologist and professor emerita of anthropology at Concordia University in Montreal. While she is most widely known for her work on Western perceptions of the veil or hijab in its varied forms, meanings, and historical uses, much of her work has focused on women's roles in public life in Muslim societies, with particular attention to how religious symbols and interpretations have been variously used to support and repress women's status.

== Detention in Iran ==
In February 2016, Hoodfar traveled to her home country of Iran, primarily for personal reasons but also for her academic research. In March, a day before Hoodfar was to leave to join family in London, members of Iran's Revolutionary Guards (IRGC) raided the flat where she was staying, confiscating her belongings and three passports. After three months of Iranian intelligence services regularly summoning her for questioning, Iranian authorities arrested her in early June. At that point, Hoodfar's family went to the news media to inform the public of her ordeal in Iran. She was indicted on charges of "dabbling in feminism and security matters" by Iran, sources close to the government singling out her work with Women Living Under Muslim Laws. Websites close to Iranian Government state that her arrest is related to soft overthrow/revolution designed by foreign governments.

Hoodfar's release was announced on September 26, 2016 in a statement issued by Foreign Ministry spokesman Bahram Qasemi to the Iranian Fars News Agency. Her incarceration lasted 112 days.

== Psychological torture ==
During her 112-day imprisonment in Evin Prison, she was put under psychological torture by members of Iran's Revolutionary Guard during dozens of interrogations. She was threatened with death. In an interview with CBS News in her first interview after being released on September 26, 2016, she also said: "I was prepared I might face a few years in prison, or as they said 15 years, maybe I would never be released."

== See also ==
- List of foreign nationals detained in Iran
