= Bilim ve Teknik =

Turkish magazine about science and technology

Cover of the January 2020 issue

Bilim ve Teknik (English: Science and Technology) is a Turkish popular science magazine, published monthly by the Scientific and Technological Research Council (Turkish: Türkiye Bilimsel ve Teknolojik Araştırma Kurumu, TÜBİTAK) of Turkey, first published in October 1967. Bilim ve Teknik has two sister magazines, Bilim Çocuk (English: Science for Children) and Meraklı Minik (English: Curious Dear), also published monthly by TÜBİTAK, which are meant to respectively be the school-age-level and preschool-level counterparts of the more teenage and adult-oriented Bilim ve Teknik.
