= Bias in curricula =

Bias in educational textbooks

Bias in curricula refers to real or perceived bias in curricula or textbooks. Biases may include minimizing wrongdoings conducted by the subject nation, such as colonialism, slavery, or genocide, bias against historical female figures or bias for or against certain religions.

== In school textbooks ==
The content of school textbooks is often the issue of debate, as their target audience is young people, and the term "whitewashing" is the one commonly used to refer to selective removal of critical or damaging evidence or comment. The reporting of military atrocities in history is extremely controversial, as in the case of the Holocaust (or Holocaust denial) and the Winter Soldier Investigation of the Vietnam War. The representation of every society's flaws or misconduct is typically downplayed in favor of a more nationalist or patriotic view. Also, Christians and other religionists have at times attempted to block the teaching of the theory of evolution in schools, as evolutionary theory appears to contradict their religious beliefs; the teaching of creationism as a science is likewise blocked from many public schools. In the context of secondary-school education, the way facts and history are presented greatly influences the interpretation of contemporary thought, opinion and socialization. One legitimate argument for censoring the type of information disseminated is based on the inappropriate quality of such material for the young.

== Religious bias ==
Many countries and states have guidelines against religious bias in education, but they are not always implemented. The guidelines of the California Department of Education (Code 60044) state the following: "No religious belief or practice may be held up to ridicule and no religious group may be portrayed as inferior." "Any explanation or description of a religious belief or practice should be present in a manner that does not encourage or discourage belief or indoctrinate the student in any particular religious belief."

== Gender bias ==
According to the fourth edition of the annual Global Education Monitoring Report of UNESCO, 2020, depictions of female characters are less frequent and often discriminatory in many countries' school text books. According to Prof Rae Lesser Blumberg women are either absent in school textbooks or depicted in subservient roles, perpetuating gender imbalance. Valeria Perasso asserts Gender bias is endemic in primary school textbooks across continents. UNESCO reports that pervasive sexist attitudes in school textbooks are invisible obstacles in educating girls, undermine their life expectations, careers, and gender equality. Females are underrepresented in textbooks and curricula, whether counted in lines of text, proportion of named characters, mentions in titles, citations in indexes or other criteria, while stereotypes of gender roles, absence from scenes, or gender-biased language is abundant.

== Political bias ==
Political bias refers to the bias or manipulation of information to favor a particular political position, party, or candidate. Closely associated with media bias, it often describes how journalists, television programs, or news organizations portray political figures or policy issues.

Political bias in education can be detected in comparison to voter opinions through opinion polls.

== By country or region ==
=== Australia ===
A recent study of student evaluations of teaching (SET) from a large public university in Sydney focused on gender and cultural bias. The dataset of more than 523,000 individual student surveys across 5 different faculties spanned a seven year period 2010-2016. There were 2,392 unique courses and 3,123 individual teachers in the dataset. The researchers concluded, "We detected statistically significant bias against women and staff with non-English language backgrounds, although these effects do not appear in every faculty. Our findings on the effect of cultural background is novel and significant because in Australia, where the population is culturally diverse, current policy and administrative actions have focused on addressing gender bias, but less on cultural or racial bias. We found some evidence that the proportion of women or staff with non-English language backgrounds in a faculty may be negatively correlated with bias, i.e., having a diverse teaching staff population may reduce bias. We also found that due to the magnitude of these potential biases, the SET scores are likely to be flawed as a measure of teaching performance. Finally, we found no evidence that student's unconscious bias changes with the level of their degree program."

=== Europe ===
==== UK ====
The teaching of history in the United Kingdom has been described as "arguably among the most disputed" topics in regards to the legacy of colonialism. The British International Studies Association has stated that "British universities have been engaged in soul searching on a number of issues including racism, slavery, trafficking, and Islamophobia", but "the real work... has yet to fully begin".

=== United States ===
Multiple allegations towards the teaching of United States history exist, from the representation of slavery in the United States to the historical presentation of Native Americans across American history. American history textbooks have also been accused of being Eurocentric and overly patriotic.

On the political left, professors Howard Zinn and James Loewen allege that United States history as presented in school textbooks has a conservative bias. A People's History of the United States, by American historian and political scientist Zinn, seeks to present American history through the eyes of groups rarely heard in mainstream histories. Loewen spent two years at the Smithsonian Institution studying and comparing twelve American history textbooks widely used throughout the United States. His findings were published in Lies My Teacher Told Me: Everything Your High School History Textbook Got Wrong.

On the political right, professor Larry Schweikart makes the opposite case: he alleges in his 48 Liberal Lies About American History that United States history education has a liberal bias.

In a landmark book called The Trouble with Textbooks, Gary A. Tobin and Dennis R. Ybarra show how some American textbooks contain anti-Semitic versions of Jewish history and faith, particularly in relation to Christianity and Islam. The authors found that some U.S. textbooks "tend to discredit the ties between Jews and the Land of Israel. Israel is blamed for starting wars in the region and being colonialist. Jews are charged with deicide in the killing of Jesus. All in all, there are repeated misrepresentations that cross the line into bigotry."

=== Asia ===
==== Israel and Palestine ====
Palestinian school text books have come under repeated criticism for anti-Israeli bias. An independent study of Palestinian textbooks by Professor Nathan Brown of George Washington University in Washington, DC, found that Palestine National Authority-authored books avoid treating anything controversial regarding Palestinian national identity, and while highly nationalistic, do not incite hatred, violence and anti-Semitism.

An analysis of Israeli textbooks in 2000 by the Center for Monitoring the Impact of Peace (CMIP), found that there was no indoctrination against the Arabs as a nation, nor a negative presentation of Islam. However in 2012, Nurit Peled-Elhanan, a professor of language and education at the Hebrew University of Jerusalem, published Palestine in Israeli School Books: Ideology and Propaganda in Education, an account of her study of the contents of Israeli school books, alleging that Israeli school books do in fact promote racism against and negative images of Arabs, and prepare Israeli children for compulsory military service.

==== Pakistan ====
Bias in education has been a common feature in the curriculum of many South Asian countries. According to Waghmar, many of the oriental societies are plagued by visceral nationalism and post-imperial neurosis where state-sanctioned dogmas suppress eclectic historical readings. Issues such as the preaching of hatred and obscurantism and the distortion of history in Pakistan have led the international scholars to suggest the need for coordinated efforts amongst the historians to produce a composite history of the subcontinent as a common South Asian reader. Bias against Indians and Hindus, as well as other religious minorities, have been found in Pakistani schoolbooks. However, Nelson here stresses the need for any educational reform to be based at the needs of the level of local communities.

The bias in Pakistani textbooks was studied by Rubina Saigol, Pervez Hoodbhoy, K. K. Aziz, I. A. Rahman, Mubarak Ali, A. H. Nayyar, Ahmed Saleem, Yvette Rosser and others.

A study by Nayyar & Salim (2003) that was conducted with 30 experts of Pakistan's education system, found that the textbooks contain statements that seek to create hate against Hindus. There was also an emphasis on Jihad, Shahadat, wars and military heroes. The study reported that the textbooks also had a lot of gender-biased stereotypes. Some of the problems in Pakistani textbooks cited in the report were: "Insensitivity to the existing religious diversity of the nation"; "Incitement to militancy and violence, including encouragement of Jehad and Shahadat"; a "glorification of war and the use of force"; "Inaccuracies of fact and omissions that serve to substantially distort the nature and significance of actual events in our history"; "Perspectives that encourage prejudice, bigotry and discrimination towards fellow citizens, especially women and religious minorities, and other towards nations" and "Omission of concepts ... that could encourage critical selfawareness among students".

These problems still seem to persist: The Curriculum Wing of the Federal Ministry of Education rejected a textbook in December 2003 because of two serious objections: The textbook contained the text of letter of a non-Muslim, and it contained the story of a family were both husband and wife worked and were sharing their household chores. In February 2004, a textbook was disapproved by the Curriculum Wing because it didn't contain enough material on jihad.

Pakistani textbooks were relatively unbiased up to 1972, but were rewritten and completely altered under Bhutto's and especially under Zia's (1977–88) rule. The bias in Pakistani textbooks was also documented by Yvette Rosser (2003). She wrote that "in the past few decades, social studies textbooks in Pakistan have been used as locations to articulate the hatred that Pakistani policy makers have attempted to inculcate towards their Hindu neighbours", and that as a result "in the minds of generations of Pakistanis, indoctrinated by the 'Ideology of Pakistan' are lodged fragments of hatred and suspicion."

Professors who have been critical of Pakistani politics or corruption have are sometimes discriminated against. Dr. Parvez Hoodbhoy, who was also a critic of Pakistani politics, had troubles leaving the country for a lecture in the Physics department at MIT, because he was denied a NOC (No Objection Certificate) necessary for travels abroad.

One of the omissions in Pakistani textbooks is Operation Gibraltar. Operation Gibraltar, which provoked the Indian Army attack on Lahore, is not mentioned in most history textbooks. According to Pakistani textbooks, Lahore was attacked without any provocation on the part of the Pakistani army. The rule of Islamic invaders like Mahmud of Ghazni is glorified, while the much more peaceful Islamic ruler Akbar is often ignored in Pakistani textbooks.

The Pakistani Curriculum document for classes K-V stated in 1995 that "at the completion of Class-V, the child should be able to":

- "Acknowledge and identify forces that may be working against Pakistan."[pg. 154]
- "Demonstrate by actions a belief in the fear of Allah." [pg. 154]
- "Make speeches on Jehad and Shahadat" [pg. 154]
- "Understand Hindu-Muslim differences and the resultant need for Pakistan." [pg. 154]
- "India's evil designs against Pakistan." [pg. 154]
- "Be safe from rumour mongers who spread false news" [pg. 158]
- "Visit police stations" [pg. 158]
- "Collect pictures of policemen, soldiers, and National Guards" [pg. 158]
- "Demonstrate respect for the leaders of Pakistan" [pg. 153]

==== Turkey ====
Turkish schools, regardless of whether they are public or private, are required to teach history based on the textbooks approved by the Ministry of Education. The state uses its monopoly to increase support for the official position of Armenian genocide denial, demonizing Armenians and presenting them as enemies. For decades, these textbooks omitted any mention of Armenians as part of Ottoman history. Since the 1980s, textbooks discuss the "events of 1915", but deflect the blame from the Ottoman government to other actors, especially imperialist powers who allegedly manipulated the Armenians to achieve their nefarious goals of undermining the empire, and the Armenians themselves, for allegedly committing treason and presenting a threat to the empire. Some textbooks admit that deportations occur and Armenians died, but present this action as necessary and justified. Most recently, textbooks have accused Armenians of perpetrating genocide against Turkish Muslims. In 2003, students in each grade level were instructed to write essays refuting the genocide.

Teachers are instructed to tell seventh-year students:

State to your students that the Russians also made some Armenians revolt on this front and murder many of our civilian citizens. Explain that the Ottoman State took certain measures following these developments, and in May 1915 implemented the 'Tehcir Kanunu' [Displacement Law] regarding the migration and settlement of Armenians in the battleground. Explain that care was taken to ensure that the land in which the Armenians who had to migrate were to settle was fertile, that police stations were established for their security and that measures were taken to ensure they could practice their previous jobs and professions.

== See also ==
- Academic bias
- Board of education
- Critical pedagogy
- Early childhood education
- Eurocentrism
- Historical negationism § In textbooks
- Philosophy of education
- Selective omission
