= Ilana Krausman Ben-Amos =

Israeli historian (born 1949)

Ilana Krausman Ben-Amos (born 1949) (Hebrew: אילנה קראוזמן בן-עמוס) is an Israeli historian who researches early modern Europe. As of 2020, she is an associate professor of history at Ben-Gurion University of the Negev, Israel.

== Biography ==
Krausman Ben-Amos is a social and cultural historian of early modern Europe, particularly early modern England. She studied for a BA and MA at the Hebrew University of Jerusalem and she gained her Ph.D. at Stanford University in 1986. Her topics of interest include the history of childhood and family, networks, social interactions and reciprocity, gift exchange, poverty, welfare and the history of the emotions.

== Selected works ==
Books

- Adolescence and Youth in Early Modern England (New Haven and London: Yale University Press, 1994).
- The Culture of Giving: Informal Support and Gift-Exchange in Early Modern England (Cambridge: Cambridge University Press, 2008, paperback edition, 2010).

Research articles

- "Failure to Become Freemen: Urban Apprentices in Early Modern England," Social History Vol. 16, No. 2, May 1991
- "Gifts and Favors: Informal Support in Early Modern England," The Journal of Modern History Vol. 72, No. 2, June 2000
