= Textbooks in the Israeli–Palestinian conflict =

Textbooks in Israel and Palestine have emerged as an issue within the larger Israeli–Palestinian conflict.

Textbooks in Israel have been found to contain narratives that dehumanize Palestinian Arabs, or provide justification for or skip over historical topics related to Israeli occupation of Palestine, such as war crimes like the Deir Yassin massacre.

Studies on Palestinian textbooks have highlighted hateful imagery and content. In response to such findings, from 2019 to 2023 the European Parliament passed four resolutions denouncing the Palestinian Authority for the content of its textbooks and stipulating that any future financing for education be conditioned on improvements.

Israel has used the topic of Palestinian textbooks as a Hasbara tool against the Palestinian Authority. Palestinians say that their textbooks rightly focus on their own national narrative, which includes the privations of life under occupation.

== Council for Religious Institutions in the Holy Land study ==
A comprehensive three-year study (2009–2012) of Israeli and Palestinian textbooks, regarded by its researchers as "the most definitive and balanced study to date on the topic," found that incitement, demonization or negative depictions of the other in children's education was "extremely rare" in both Israeli and Palestinian school texts, with only 6 instances discovered in over 9,964 pages of Palestinian textbooks, none of which consisted of "general dehumanising characterisations of personal traits of Jews or Israelis". Israeli officials rejected the study as biased, while Palestinian Authority officials claimed it vindicated their view that their textbooks are as fair and balanced as Israel's.

The study, published in 2013 by the Council for Religious Institutions in the Holy Land, an interfaith association of Jewish, Christian, and Muslim leaders in Israel, the West Bank, and Gaza, produced different results. The study was supervised by a psychiatrist, Prof. emeritus Bruce Wexler of Yale University and his NGO, A Different Future, and a joint Palestinian-Israeli research team, headed by Professors Daniel Bar-Tal (Tel Aviv University) and Sami Adwan (Bethlehem University), was commissioned. Six Israeli and four Palestinian bilingual research assistants were employed to analyze the texts of 370 Israeli and 102 Palestinian books from grades 1 to 12. The study found that, while most schoolbooks on either side were factually accurate, both Israel and the Palestinians failed to adequately and positively represent each other, and presented "exclusive unilateral national narratives". It was found that 40 percent of Israeli and 15 percent of Palestinian textbooks were judged to contain neutral depictions of the other, whereas negative characterizations were discerned in 26 percent of Israeli state school books and 50 percent of the Palestinian ones. Israeli schoolbooks were deemed superior to Palestinian ones with regard to preparing children for peace, but the study praised both Israel and the Palestinian Authority for producing textbooks almost completely unblemished by "dehumanizing and demonizing characterizations of the other".

== Textbooks in Israel ==
=== Assessments of Hebrew textbooks ===
In his 2004 article "The Arab Image in Hebrew School Textbooks", Dan Bar-Tal of Tel Aviv University studied 124 textbooks used in Israeli schools. He concluded that generations of Israeli Jews have been taught a negative and often delegitimizing view of Arabs. He claims Arabs are portrayed in these textbooks as primitive, inferior in comparison to Jews, violent, untrustworthy, fanatic, treacherous and aggressive. While history books in the elementary schools hardly mentioned Arabs, the high school textbooks that covered the Arab–Jewish conflict stereotyped Arabs negatively, as intransigent and uncompromising.

Nurit Peled-Elhanan, a professor of language and education at the Hebrew University of Jerusalem, published Palestine in Israeli School Books: Ideology and Propaganda in Education, an account of her study of the contents of Israeli school books. She asserts that the books promote racism against and negative images of Arabs, and that they prepare young Israelis for their compulsory military service. After examining "hundreds and hundreds" of books, Peled-Elhanan claims she did not find one photograph that depicted an Arab as a "normal person". She has stated that the most important finding in the books she studied concerns the historical narrative of events in 1948, the year in which Israel fought a war to establish itself as an independent state. She claims that the killing of Palestinians is depicted as something that was necessary for the survival of the nascent Jewish state. "It's not that the massacres are denied, they are represented in Israeli school books as something that in the long run was good for the Jewish state." "[T]he Israeli version of events are stated as objective facts, while the Palestinian-Arab versions are stated as possibility, realized in openings such as 'According to the Arab version' ... [or] 'Deir Yassin [sic.] became a myth in the Palestinian narrative ... a horrifying negative image of the Jewish conqueror in the eyes of Israel's Arabs'.

With reference to previous studies of Israeli school textbooks, Peled-Elhanan states that, despite some signs of improvement in the 1990s, the more recent books do not ignore, but justify, issues such as the Nakba. For example, in all the books mentioning Deir Yassin, the massacre is justified because: "the slaughter of friendly Palestinians brought about the flight of other Palestinians which enabled the establishment of a coherent Jewish state."

She also states that contrary to the hope of previous studies "for 'the appearance of a new narrative in [Israeli] history textbooks' ... some of the most recent school books (2003–09) regress to the 'first generation' [1950s] accounts — when archival information was less accessible — and are, like them 'replete with bias, prejudice, errors, [and] misrepresentations'" (Palestine in Israeli School Books, p. 228).

In 2013, it was reported that Israeli science textbook publishers had been instructed to remove details of "human reproduction, pregnancy prevention and sexually transmitted diseases from science textbooks used in state religious junior high schools as well as from their teacher manuals".

=== Assessments of Arabic textbooks ===
According to a 2011 report by the Arab Cultural Association, Arabic textbooks provided to third grade to ninth grade students in Israeli schools contained at least 16,255 mistakes. The report was based on a study and examination of textbooks in all subjects by a committee, headed by Dr. Elias Atallah. Association director Dr. Rawda Atallah said the findings were not surprising, since they were similar to the findings of a previous study published in November 2009, which reported that more than 4,000 mistakes in language and syntax were found in textbooks for second grade students in Arab schools. Researchers also spoke about the way in which Arab students' cultural and national identities are covered. For example, while textbooks state that Jews and non-Jews live in the Galilee, the word "Arab" is never mentioned. Dr. George Mansour, who examined the history textbooks, reported that they ignored the presence of the Arab-Palestinian people in Israel and stressed the Promised Land of the Jewish people: "There is a process of de-Palestinization, instilling of the Zionist narrative and minimizing of Arab culture," reported Dr. Mansour.

=== Teaching the Arab–Israeli conflict ===
In general, the Israeli occupation of Palestine is hardly mentioned by Israeli textbooks or by high school matriculation examinations, according to a study by Professor Avner Ben-Amos of Tel Aviv University. The lives and perspectives of Palestinians are rarely mentioned, an approach he terms "interpretive denial." In most Israeli textbooks, "the Jewish control and the Palestinians' inferior status appear as a natural, self-evident situation that one doesn't have to think about."

According to the Ben-Amos study, one of the main civics textbooks used in Israeli high schools fails to address at all the limited rights of the millions of Palestinians living in the West Bank under Israeli military occupation. The more general issue of the occupation was addressed in a previous edition of this textbook but the Israeli debate regarding the occupation was shrunk to a few sentences in the most recent edition under right-wing education ministers. Another Israeli civics textbook completely omits discussion of the dispute over the occupied territories. In civics high school matriculation tests over the past 20 years, no question appeared on the limiting of the Palestinians' rights. The geography matriculation exams ignore the Green Line and the Palestinians.

=== Nakba terminology ===
Israel has ordered the word Nakba, meaning disaster or catastrophe and which refers to the foundation of Israel in 1948 and the subsequent forced flight of the Palestinians from Israel-captured land, to be removed from Israeli Arab textbooks. The term was introduced in books for use in Arab schools in 2007 when the Education Ministry was run by Yuli Tamir of the Labor party. Israeli Prime Minister Benjamin Netanyahu justified the ban by saying that the term was "propaganda against Israel."

The book "Nationalism: Building a State in the Middle East," published by the Zalman Shazar Center, was approved for 11th and 12th classrooms by Israel's Ministry of Education and distributed to shops throughout the country for use in high schools. However, the Minister of Education instructed that the contents of the book be reexamined. The Ministry of Education took the unusual step of removing the book from the shelves and then redacted it. Among other changes, term "ethnic cleansing" in relation to the Nakba was removed and now refers instead to an organized policy of expulsion by the pre-state Jewish militia.

In the past decade, there has been a significant shift within the Israeli education system regarding the representation of the Nakba. The concept has become increasingly present in textbooks and official educational materials across Jewish education systems. At the same time, as the Nakba gains more prominence in the Israeli education system, the differences between state secular and state religious education have become more pronounced. While the secular education system presents a more nuanced and complex perspective on the Nakba, the religious state education system continues to maintain views that unambiguously justify it.

== Textbooks in Palestine ==
=== International assessment ===
==== 2000 and 2001 Nathan Brown ====
Since 1994 the Palestinian Authority had been replacing older textbooks, and in 1999 and 2000, Nathan Brown, Professor of Political Science at George Washington University, published a study on this subject. Regarding the Palestinian Authority's newer textbooks, he states:

The new books have removed the more blatant anti-Semitism present in the older books while they tell history from a Palestinian point of view, they do not represent the State of Israel and often label it as "Palestine"; each book contains a foreword describing the West Bank and Gaza as "the two parts of the homeland"; the maps take some other measures to avoid indicating borders; the books avoid treating Israel at length but do indeed mention it by name; the new books must be seen as a tremendous improvement from a Jewish, Israeli, and humanitarian view.

In 2001, in Democracy, History, and the contest over the Palestinian curriculum, Nathan J. Brown wrote 'the Palestinian curriculum is not a war curriculum; while highly nationalistic, it does not incite hatred, violence, and anti-Semitism. It cannot be described as a "peace curriculum" either, but the charges against it are often wildly exaggerated or inaccurate.' In the same document, he also wrote that 'virtually every discussion in English on Palestinian education repeats the charge that Palestinian textbooks incite students against Jews and Israel. It may therefore come as a surprise to readers that the books authored under the PNA are largely innocent of these charges.'

==== 2001 European Union discussion on halting aid ====
In 2001, in response to allegations made against the EU, Chris Patten, on the Foreign Affairs Committee of the European Parliament, and External Relations Commissioner stated that "It is a total fabrication that the European Union has funded textbooks with anti-Semitic arguments within them in Palestinian schools. It is a complete lie."

==== 2002 and 2004 Firer-Adwan comparisons ====
Ruth Firer of the Harry S. Truman Institute for the Advancement of Peace at the Hebrew University of Jerusalem and Sami Adwan, a professor of education at Bethlehem University in Bethlehem, compared Palestinian and Israeli textbooks in 2002. Of the Palestinian textbooks they found that "[a]ccording to the everyday experience of Palestinians, modern-day Israelis are presented as occupiers. The texts include examples of Israelis killing and imprisoning Palestinians, demolishing their homes, uprooting fruit trees, and confiscating their lands and building settlements on them. The texts also talk about the right of return for the 1948 Palestinian refugees when describing how those refugees live in camps." The Israeli textbooks are generally "presented without the national-political debate". Their 2004 study of 13 Israeli textbooks and 9 Palestinian textbooks found that "neither side's books tell the story of the conflict from the other's viewpoint, both ignore the other side's suffering and each counts only its only victims".

==== 2002 review and 2004 follow-up report by IPCRI ====
In 2002, the United States Congress requested the United States Department of State to commission a reputable non-governmental organization (NGO) to conduct a review of the new Palestinian curriculum. The Israel/Palestine Center for Research and Information (IPCRI) was thereby commissioned by the U.S. Embassy in Tel Aviv and the US Consul General in Jerusalem to review the Palestinian Authority's textbooks. Its report, completed in March 2003, stated the "overall orientation of the curriculum is peaceful despite the harsh and violent realities on the ground. It does not openly incite against Israel and the Jews. It does not openly incite hatred and violence. Religious and political tolerance is emphasized in a good number of textbooks and in multiple contexts."

In a June 2004 follow-up report reflagged that "the practice of "appropriating" sites, areas, localities, geographic regions, etc. inside the territory of the State of Israel as Palestine/Palestinian", and noted that "No map of the region bears the name of "Israel" in its pre-1967 borders" and that some predominantly Jewish Israeli towns were not represented at all. It added that "terms and passages used to describe some historical events are sometimes offensive in nature and could be construed as reflecting hatred of and discrimination against Jews and Judaism".

According to Roger Avenstrup, writing in The New York Times, the 2003 report from IPCRI concludes that overall the curriculum is peaceful and does not contain hatred or violence against Israel or the Jews, while the 2004 report states that there are 'no signs of promoting hatred toward Israel, Judaism or Zionism, nor toward the Western Judeo-Christian tradition or values.'

==== 2009 US State Department's Human Rights report ====
In its 2009 Human Rights report, the U.S. State Department wrote that after the 2006 revision of textbooks by the PA Ministry of Education and Higher Education, international academics concluded that books did not incite violence against Jews but showed imbalance, bias, and inaccuracy. Some maps did not depict the current political reality, showing neither Israel nor the settlements. Palestinian textbooks used in Palestinian schools and schools in East Jerusalem run by the Jerusalem municipality were inconsistent in defining the 1967 borders, and did not label areas and cities with both Arabic and Hebrew names.

==== 2009-2012 report ====
A comprehensive three-year study, regarded by its researchers as 'the most definitive and balanced study to date on the topic', was conducted between 2009 and 2012. The researchers examined 3,000 authors, illustrations, and maps in school books used in Palestinian, Israeli state, and Israeli ultra-Orthodox schools. The study found that incitement, demonization or negative depictions of the other in children's education was "extremely rare" in both Israeli and Palestinian school texts, with only 6 instances discovered in over 9,964 pages of Palestinian textbooks, none of which consisted of "general dehumanising characterisations of personal traits of Jews or Israelis". Israeli officials rejected the study as biased, while Palestinian Authority officials claimed it vindicated their view that their textbooks are as fair and balanced as Israel's.

==== 2013 CRIHL study ====
In 2009 a study was launched by the Council for Religious Institutions in the Holy Land, an interfaith association of Jewish, Christian, and Muslim leaders in Israel and the Occupied Territories, which planned on making recommendations to both sides' Education Ministries based on the report. It was supervised by a psychiatrist, Prof. emeritus Bruce Wexler of Yale University and his NGO – A Different Future and commissioned a joint Palestinian-Israeli research team headed by Professors Daniel Bar-Tal (Tel Aviv University) and Sami Adwan (Bethlehem University), which employed research assistants (6 Israeli and 4 Palestinian bilingual research assistants) to analyse texts of 370 Israeli and 102 Palestinian books from grades 1 to 12. Both The Guardian and AAP mention 3000 approved textbooks from 2011 as subject to the study's analysis, including those used in the ultra-Orthodox Jewish community's educational system. The Israel ministry of education's Arabic texts for Israeli Arab schools were omitted from the survey.

The study, overseen by an international Scientific Advisory Panel (SAP), was to proceed in three phases: organization, analysis, and review, and was projected to draw up its conclusions by May 2012. The study was funded by the United States State Department. The Palestinian National Authority cooperated with the researchers while Israel withheld formal participation.

The results of the comprehensive in-depth survey, entitled "Victims of Our Own Narratives? Portrayal of the 'Other' in Israeli and Palestinian School Books", were announced in February 2013, in a statement signed by most members of the advisory panel, with the exception of several members, including Jerusalem physician Elihu Richter, who believes the method might understate Palestinian incitement, and of Arnon Groiss, who had not read the final report and also had doubts about the methodology employed. The advisory council statement attested to the high quality of the scientific standards used, and underwrote the findings. Complaints were made that they had not been given an advanced copy of the final report. One anonymous SAP member likened the potential impact of the study to the Goldstone Report.

==== The image of the "other" ====
The study found that, while most schoolbooks on either side were factually accurate, both Israel and the Palestinians failed to adequately and positively represent each other, and presented "exclusive unilateral national narratives". 40% of Israeli, and 15% of Palestinian textbooks were judged to contain neutral depictions of the other. While the majority of both countries' textbooks represent the other as the enemy, Israeli state school texts were more likely to portray Palestinians in a positive light, with 11% of their textbooks and 1% of Palestinian textbooks, viewing the other positively. Some Israeli state school texts include criticism of Israel's actions, while both Palestinian and Haredi Orthodox schools used textbooks that were "overwhelmingly negative in their depiction of the other". One Israeli civics textbooks included self-criticism, an 11th-grade civics reader that refers to the 1948 Deir Yassin massacre as the "killing of dozens of helpless Arabs" and the key cause of the 1948 Palestinian expulsion and flight. Likewise, a 4th-grade Israeli book included a story about a Palestinian who came to the rescue of a wounded Israeli soldier out of his "obligation as a Muslim Arab". Such material was found, however, to be exceptional. One Israel state school textbook referred to Arabs as "masses of the wild nation"; an ultra-Orthodox text wrote of a "convoy of bloodthirsty Arabs" and of a village that was a "nest of murderers". Another called Israel "a little lamb in a sea of seventy wolves", referring to Arab nations. Various Palestinian texts included negative language that referred to the "Zionist occupation", the "usurpation of Palestine", and to an Israeli prison as a "slaughterhouse". Both sides' textbooks contained references to martyrdom and dying for one's land and liberty. Overall negative or very negative representations of Palestinians occurred 49% of the time in Israeli state school, 73% in Haredi, as opposed to 84% in Palestinian, textbooks. Highly negative characterizations were discerned in 26% of Israeli state school books and 50% of the Palestinian ones. Depictions of the "other" as enemy occurred 75% in Israeli, and in 81% of Palestinian textbooks.

==== Educating towards peace; maps ====
Israeli schoolbooks were deemed superior to Palestinian ones with regard to preparing children for peace, but the study praised both Israel and the Palestinian Authority for producing textbooks almost completely unblemished by "dehumanizing and demonizing characterizations of the other". The study appeared to undermine a charge, often used by Israel to delegitimize Palestinian claims that they were ready for statehood, according to which Palestinians were "educated to hate". With regard to maps, 4% of Palestinian maps mark the Green Line, or label the area west of it as "Israel", 6 out of 10 omit borders, while another third include the green line without reference to Israel; 76% of Israeli textbook maps fail to distinguish Palestine and Israel, and the Palestinian areas lack labelling, implying that the Palestinian areas form part of Israel.

In January 2026, in Lebanon, UNRWA—under pressure from Israel—altered maps in certain sixth-grade geography textbooks, replacing "Palestine" with "the West Bank" and "the Gaza Strip." This move sparked widespread protests across several Palestinian refugee camps in Lebanon; some protesters tore up and burned the geography textbooks.

==== Criticism from panel members ====
There were critical voices from among the study's Scientific Advisory Panel (SAP). Jerusalem physician Elihu Richter believed the method applied might understate Palestinian incitement. Dr. Arnon Groiss, who was on the SAP of the study and in the past conducted an independent research of Palestinian, Egyptian, Syrian, Saudi Arabian, Tunisian and Iranian schoolbooks between 2000 and 2010, has highly criticized the study methodology and subsequent conclusions. Groiss objected, inter alia, to the selection of the Study Material ("highly demonizing pieces were not included, under the pretext that they were not explicit enough", "explicit denial...was not included too"), to the categorization methods ("real cases of ignoring the 'other' deliberately without degrading him slipped away from scrutiny", false positive descriptions) and to the analysis itself ("There is no attempt to study the quotes more deeply and draw conclusions", "the report considers Jihad and martyrdom as values, which is acceptable academically, but it fails to evaluate their impact on the issues of war and peace"). Groiss concluded that "the main question, namely, to what extent is this or that party engaged in actual education for peace, if at all, has not been answered by the report itself."

==== Reactions ====
- Israeli spokesmen attacked the report before its results were released. The Ministry of Education, justifying the decision to deny cooperation to the project, states that it was "biased, unprofessional and significantly lacking in objectivity", asserting that it refused to cooperate "elements who are interested in maliciously slandering the Israeli educational system and the state of Israel". Likud party member and Israeli Education Minister Gideon Saar, branded the report "biased, unprofessional and profoundly unobjective", criticizing it as an "attempt to create a parallel between the Israeli and Palestinian educational systems without any foundation whatsoever".
- Salam Fayyad, the Palestinian premier, welcomed the study, and commented that it "confirms that Palestinian textbooks do not contain any form of blatant incitement, which is based on contempt towards the 'other'". He also noted that the Palestinian Ministry of Education had been instructed the "to study the report thoroughly and to use its conclusions... to develop school curriculums", based on "principles of coexistence, tolerance, justice, and human dignity".
- The Israel Government Press Office announced that Yossi Kuperwasser, director-general of the Strategic Affairs Ministry, would provide fresh data documenting incitement in the PA education system.
- The US State Department, through its spokesperson Victoria Nuland, said the department had funded the study to enable the Council of Religious Institutions to pursue its objectives of peace and religious tolerance in national curriculums, and stated that the U.S. would abstain from taking a position on the study's findings.
- The Anti-Defamation League came out in support of the Israeli Education Ministry's criticism, declaring that the report was "distorted and counterproductive".

==== 2019 Report by UN Committee on the Elimination of Racial Discrimination ====
In 2019, the UN Committee on the Elimination of Racial Discrimination (CERD) released a report that, among other points, encouraged the Palestinian Authority, to ensure textbooks and school curricula did not contain offensive comments and images.

==== 2019-2021 Georg Eckert Institute Report ====
In 2021, a new report was published by the EU-commissioned Georg Eckert Institute. Out of 309 available volumes, 156 were chosen. The selection process was based on ensuring a balanced ratio of books from each of the three years in which they were published, including all subjects and school years.

The report found that while several sections and chapters are devoted to topics such as tolerance and human rights, there are also narratives that are anti-Semitic and glorify violence. The textbook analysis did not reveal any direct calls for violence against Israelis. However, the analysis did expose portrayals that defend and sometimes support violence against Israelis - who are typically called "Zionist occupiers".

- Palestinian attacks against Israeli civilians during the 1970s are not condemned but rather portrayed as a legitimate method of resistance.
- Acts of terrorism, including those committed by Dalal al-Mughrabi, are cited as an example of self-sacrificing "resistance".
- In maps of the region, Israel is absent and Israeli cities founded by Jews, like Tel Aviv, are not shown.
- The textbooks prefer to use the term "Zionist occupation" instead of mentioning Israel.
- In one case, Jews are collectively depicted as enemies of Muhammad who attempted to kill him; this accusation is later linked with the Israeli-Palestinian conflict.

In March 2020, a Westminster Hall debate on the EU review noted that in 2017, Sabri Saidam, the PA's Minister of Education, said that the removal of Israel from maps and the glorification of the so-called martyrs are a product of "the ripple effects" of the Israeli-Palestinian conflict.

=== Studies by Israel-affiliated organizations ===
==== 2007 PMW report and US reactions ====
In February 2007, Palestinian Media Watch (PMW) released a report entitled "From Nationalist Battle to Religious Conflict: New 12th Grade Palestinian Textbooks Present a World Without Israel" containing analysis of eight textbooks published by the PA at the end of 2006. The US Senator Hillary Clinton joined with PMW for the release of the report written by PMW director Itamar Marcus and associate director Barbara Crook. Sen. Clinton said that the books, which she called "child abuse" and the "glorification of death and violence", caused her to express skepticism about whether Palestinian Authority Chairman Mahmoud Abbas could be a fair partner for peace.

The report also indicated several instances within these textbooks of what the authors called Holocaust denial. In addition, the report states the text books describe the Islamic World and the United States as being involved in a "Clash of Civilizations" and describes the Iraqi Insurgency as being engaged in "brave resistance to liberate Iraq".

Senator Clinton joined with Elie Wiesel to speak out about anti-Israel sentiments and antisemitic content in Palestinian textbooks in September 2000. In June 2001, she joined with Senator Charles Schumer to speak out again on the issue, sending a letter to President Bush, urging him to make clear to Yasser Arafat that peace is not possible without a full and immediate cessation of the Palestinian Authority's hateful rhetoric and urging that funding be contingent on the cessation of such incitement. In October 2003, she joined the Senate Labor, HHS and Education Appropriations Subcommittee hearing on Palestinian textbooks and other media that glorifies violence and martyrdom.

==== 2011 IMPACT-SE report ====
The ongoing research of the Institute for Monitoring Peace and Cultural Tolerance in School Education (IMPACT-SE) on how textbooks, exams, and other official course material in the Middle East portray the "Other" concluded in a 2011 report that Palestinian textbooks portray Jews and Israelis in a negative manner. However, the arguments brought by IMPACT-SE, formerly known as the Center for Monitoring Impact and Peace (CMIP) have been heavily disputed. In particular, according to Prof. Nathan J. Brown, CMIP's "method was to follow harsh criticisms with quotation after quotation purporting to prove a point... In short, the CMIP reports read as if they were written by a ruthless prosecuting attorney anxious for a conviction at any cost... Exaggerated rhetoric, charges of anti-Semitism and racism, and denial of the significance of existing changes in the curriculum will hardly convince any one further improvements are worth the effort."

== Reactions ==
In 2021, the European Parliament also condemned UNRWA on the grounds that its textbooks call for the destruction of Israel and the establishment of a Palestinian state in place of Israel, West Bank and the Gaza Strip, and encourage children to defend Palestine with their blood. The European Parliament said that it would impose conditions on funds unless the curriculum is immediately changed to encourage coexistence with Israel.

In 2022, the European Parliament's Budgetary Control Committee condemned the Palestinian Authority (PA) for using EU funds to create school books containing violent and hateful content.

== See also ==
- Institute for Monitoring Peace and Cultural Tolerance in School Education
- Pakistani textbooks controversy (Pakistan studies curriculum issues)
- Racism in Israel
- Racism in Palestine
- Saudi Arabian textbook controversy
- Textbooks in Israel
- Hamas–UNRWA Holocaust dispute
