= Institute for Monitoring Peace and Cultural Tolerance in School Education =

Israeli non-profit organization

- Founded: 1998
- Founder: Yohanan Manor
- Purpose: Areas of conflict
- Region served: School Textbook Analysis
- Method: Developed by IMPACT-SE using international criteria for curriculum analysis
- Key people: Helene Bornstein Marcus Sheff Arik Agassi
- Website: www.impact-se.org

The Institute for Monitoring Peace and Cultural Tolerance in School Education (IMPACT-SE), formerly known as the Center for Monitoring the Impact of Peace (CMIP), is an Israeli non-profit that describes itself as a "research, policy and advocacy organisation" and monitors the content of school textbooks.

The current CEO of the organization is Marcus Sheff, a former Israeli-British journalist and media executive, and a current major in reserves in the Israel Defense Forces (IDF) Spokesperson Unit.

== Scope and impact ==
IMPACT report, 2000

The organization analyzes textbooks, teachers' guides, and curricula for "radicalization", primarily focusing on the Middle East-North Africa region, and presents reports and policy recommendations to legislators and senior government officials in America and Europe. One such report served, in part, as the basis for the European Parliament's 2018 decision to freeze over €15 million of funding to the Palestinian Authority (PA) until it agreed to "reform its school curriculum and textbooks to bring them in line with UNESCO standards for peace and tolerance in school education." The same report by the organization led to questions being raised publicly over similar funding from governments in Switzerland, Germany and the UK. However, international reviews and studies have repeatedly criticized IMPACT-SE's reports for methodological shortcomings, including misattributions, translation errors, and decontextualized quotations. A 2021 study by the Georg Eckert Institute for International Textbook Research (GEI) in Germany found allegations by IMPACT-se that Palestinian school curriculum contains "widespread incitement to hatred and violence" were unfounded, and Palestinian textbooks were already in line with UNESCO standards, and that reviews conducted by IMPACT-se were neither impartial nor credible.

A briefing from the European Middle East Project (EuMEP) noted that IMPACT-se had attempted to misrepresent the findings of the GEI study in the press, and suggested that screening textbook material should not be considered a main priority in EU–PA relations, writing "To think that Palestinian anger towards Israel is motivated by textbooks rather than by the daily injustices and humiliations Palestinians suffer under its occupation lacks any basis in reality."

== Impact within Israel ==
In Israel, the organization's reporting generated media analysis of failures in the publicly funded ultra-Orthodox Jewish educational system in 2017. The organization announced in 2018 that it would partner with the Israeli organization the International School of Peace to help develop a curriculum for Syrian children seeking refuge in Greece.

== Media ==
Reports in the media which include the work of the Institute for Monitoring Peace and Cultural Tolerance in School Education include:

- Der Bund (Switzerland), UNO-Schulbücher verherrlichen Terroristen (January 2019)
- Jerusalem Post (Israel), "European Parliament Committee Votes to Freeze €15m to PA Over Inciting Textbooks" (September 2018)
- Sunday Times (UK), Britain gives £20m for schools glorifying martyrs and jihad (April 2018)
- La Libre (Belgium), "Quand des manuels scolaires palestiniens promeuvent le martyre: la Belgique impliquée" (November 2017)
- Newsweek, "Why are Palestinian kids being taught to hate?" (March 2017)
- Hurriyet (Turkey), "Another dangerous ideological touch to education" (January 2017)

== See also ==
- Textbooks in the Israeli–Palestinian conflict
- Palestinian Media Watch
- Education in Israel
- Education in Palestine
- Education in Egypt
- Hasbara
- MEMRI
