= UNRWA and Israel =

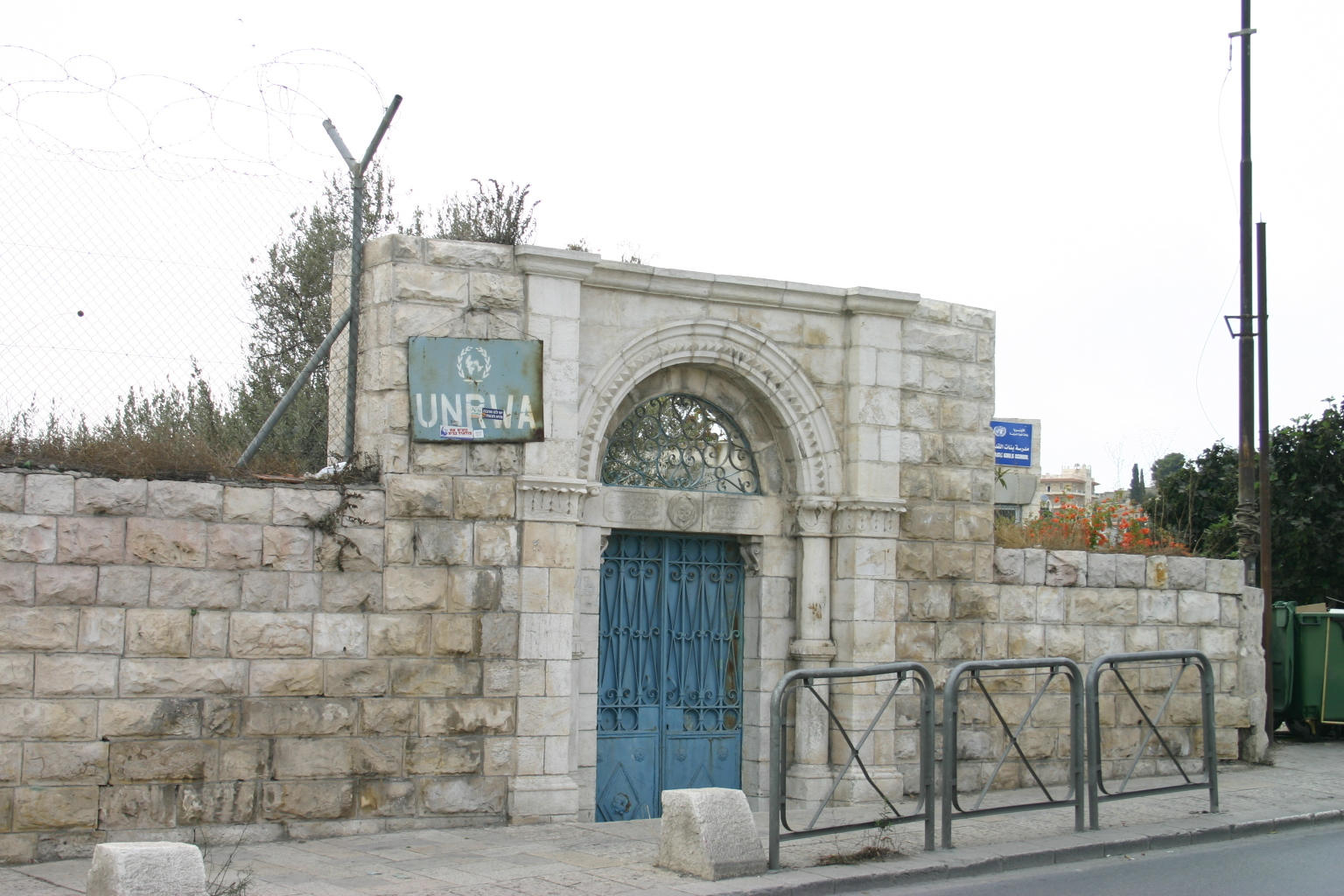
UNRWA offices in East Jerusalem, Israeli-occupied West Bank.

The relationship between the United Nations Relief and Works Agency for Palestine Refugees in the Near East (UNRWA) and Israel is a feature of the Israeli–Palestinian conflict. For decades, UNRWA has faced Israeli allegations surrounding its neutrality. It is the largest relief organization in the Gaza Strip which is currently undergoing a humanitarian crisis during the Gaza war. UNRWA was created as a United Nations agency in 1949 to support the relief of Palestinian refugees in the wake of their expulsion and flight during the 1948 Palestine war. After Israel captured the West Bank and Gaza in the 1967 Six-Day War, it requested that UNRWA continue its operations there, which it would facilitate.

In early 2024, Israel made a series of allegations against UNRWA, including that a number of its Gaza Strip staff had participated in the October 7 attacks and that hundreds of them were members of militant groups. The allegations led to aid cuts to the organization, most of which were later reversed with the exception of the United States, the organization's largest donor.

Eventually, a UN investigation found that nine UNRWA staff members may have been involved in the attack on Israel and terminated them, found that evidence against nine other staff members was insufficient, and found that there was no evidence against one additional accused staff member. In October 2024, the Knesset—based on these allegations—passed bills banning UNRWA from operating within Israel.

In October 2025, the International Court of Justice (ICJ) found that "Israel has not substantiated its allegations that a significant part of UNRWA's employees are 'members of Hamas… or other terrorist factions".

In June 2026, UNRWA dismissed an additional seventy employees in Gaza for safety and security reasons, but said that this did "not constitute in any way a validation of the claims made against them."

Also in 2026, a United States oversight body stated that more than 100 UNRWA staffers were affiliated with Hamas’s military wing and had participated in the October 7 attacks. The U.S. Agency for International Development inspector general’s office said these workers included educators, security personnel and medical professionals.

== Background ==
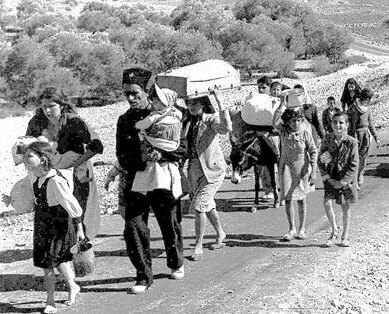
Palestinian refugees leaving the Galilee region during the 1948 Palestine war

The 1948 Palestine war saw the expulsion and flight of around 700,000 Palestinians, which were a majority of former Mandatory Palestine's predominantly Arab population, and the subsequent establishment of Israel. These Palestinian refugees were scattered in what became the West Bank and the Gaza Strip, and in neighboring countries such as Lebanon, Jordan and Syria. This displacement has been characterized by most historians as ethnic cleansing.

The United Nations intervened to deal with the aftermath of its 1947 partition plan for Palestine, and it chose to create a new special agency for Palestinian refugees, instead of involving the existing International Refugee Organization (IRO). Israel and Zionist Jewish organizations worldwide were responsible for this decision to exclude the IRO, as it had been the same body that was assisting European Jewish refugees following their persecution by Nazi Germany during World War II, and they wanted to avoid any comparison or association between the two situations. Furthermore, the IRO's first solution to dealing with refugees would have been repatriation, which Israel sought to avoid. This decision was called one of the UN's "first misguided decisions" by Israeli historian Ilan Pappe.

UNRWA was not committed to the return of Palestinian refugees displaced by the 1948 war as was stipulated by the UN General Assembly resolution 194, but was created to provide subsidies and employment to the refugees in the camps. It was also responsible for the construction of camps, schools and medical facilities.

UNRWA is a UN agency responsible for supporting the relief and human development of Palestinian refugees. It was established to assist Palestinians displaced by the 1948 Palestine war (estimated at 700,000 individuals) and subsequent conflicts, along with their descendants, including legally adopted children. It now aids over 5.6 million registered Palestinian refugees (as of 2019). In 2023, UNRWA's largest donors were the US, the EU and Germany.

After Israel captured the West Bank and Gaza in the June 1967 Six-Day War, it requested that the UNRWA continue its operations there, which it would facilitate. A few days after the conclusion of the war, Israeli defense minister Moshe Dayan wrote in the closing minutes of a governmental meeting on 19 June 1967 that: "800,000 refugees are now under our responsibility, after years of the world shouting at the Arab states to do something about it." He continued, writing that: "It is not an issue now, let us not raise it. We shall deal with it later... We should be thankful for the fact that UNRWA still takes care of them." Since then the relationship has been characterized by two-state advocate Baruch Spiegel, as "an uneasy marriage of convenience between two unlikely bedfellows that have helped perpetuate the problem both have allegedly sought to resolve."

Immediately following the Six-Day War, on 14 June UNRWA Commissioner-General Dr. Laurence Michelmore and Political Advisor to the Israeli Foreign Minister Michael Comay exchanged letters that has since served as much of the basis for the relationship between Israel and UNRWA. Commonly referred to the Comay-Michelmore Exchange of Letters, the initial letter from Michelmore reiterates a verbal conversation between the two, stating that:

at the request of the Israel Government, UNRWA would continue its assistance to the Palestine refugees, with the full co-operation of the Israel authorities, in the West Bank and Gaza Strip areas. For its part, the Israel Government will facilitate the task of UNRWA to the best of its ability, subject only to regulations or arrangements which may be necessitated by considerations of military security.

In his responding letter, Comay wrote:

I agree that your letter and this reply constitute a provisional agreement between UNRWA and the Government of Israel, to remain in force until replaced or cancelled.

With a workforce of over 30,000 employees, including approximately 13,000 in Gaza, UNRWA predominantly comprises Palestinian refugees alongside a smaller contingent of international staff. Operating in Gaza, the West Bank, Jordan, Syria and Lebanon, the agency's mandate has shifted from providing employment and humanitarian aid to delivering healthcare, schooling, and social services to the population it serves. Prior to the Gaza war, UNRWA operated 700 schools and 140 health centers in the Gaza Strip.

UNRWA is the only UN agency dedicated to aiding refugees from a specific region or conflict, distinguishing it from UNHCR, a UN agency established in 1950 to assist refugees globally. Unlike UNRWA, UNHCR's mandate includes supporting refugees in achieving local integration, resettlement in third countries, or repatriation when feasible, with the aim of eliminating their refugee status.

Israel has been a longtime critic of UNRWA and considers it an obstacle to resolving the Israel-Palestine conflict, by preventing the descendants of refugees from settling in their present locations and keeping the question of return open. Israel has also expressed concern over what the agency teaches students and over the agency's relation to Hamas; according to Israel, schools operated by the agency have been used by Hamas for terrorist activities. In 2021, UNRWA's major donors, Australia, Canada, UK and the European Union, began investigating hate and violence in UNRWA textbooks, UNRWA responded by blocking access to the textbooks in its website. In a hearing later the same year, UNRWA Commissioner-General Philippe Lazzarini acknowledged that the content of the UNRWA school curriculum included antisemitism, glorification of acts of terror and incitement to violence.

A few weeks after the 7 October attacks, the Israeli non-profit IMPACT-SE reported that at least a hundred Hamas members had been educated within the UNRWA system, with two confirmed to have participated in the attacks. Israeli officials have said that since the 7 October attacks, several UNRWA members have been observed celebrating the incidents on social media platforms. Prior to the release of the allegations, Israeli officials had discussed ways to shut down UNRWA funding. At the end of December 2023, The Times of Israel reported the contents of "a high-level, classified Foreign Ministry report" outlining a three-step plan to force UNRWA out of post-war Gaza, with step one involving a "comprehensive report on alleged UNRWA cooperation with Hamas". On 4 January 2024, Israel Hayom reported that a group of Knesset members were seeking to halt global funding for UNRWA, based on concerns that it is a tool of Hamas. MK Sharren Haskel stated they sought "to stop funds which are being transferred from various countries to this organization, and remove UNRWA's mask".

On 17 January 2024, UNRWA announced the creation of an independent Review Group to be led by Catherine Colonna, former French Minister of Foreign Affairs, to assess whether the Agency is doing everything within its power to ensure neutrality and to respond to allegations of serious breaches when they are made. The report was published on 22 April 2024 and found that Israel has not provided evidence of claims that many UNRWA employees are members of terrorist organisations. While suggesting ways that neutrality safeguards for UNRWA staff could be improved, the report says that they are already more rigorous than most other comparable institutions. The report also considers that UNRWA is indispensable to Palestinians in the region. The report did not investigate the specific allegation that 12 UNRWA employees were involved in the Hamas-led assault on Israel as that was subject of a separate internal enquiry. which on August 5, 2024, found that nine UNRWA staff members may have been involved in the attack on Israel and terminated them. The investigation also found evidence against nine other staff members to be insufficient, and there was no evidence against one additional accused staff member.

== Relations 2020 and before ==
UNRWA has been criticised by the Israeli government and politicians for alleged involvement with Palestinian militant groups, such as Hamas. In 2004, Israel stated that Peter Hansen, UNRWA's former Commissioner-General (1996–2005) "consistently adopted a trenchant anti-Israel line" which resulted in biased and exaggerated reports against Israel and demanded he be removed. UNRWA has also lodged complaints.

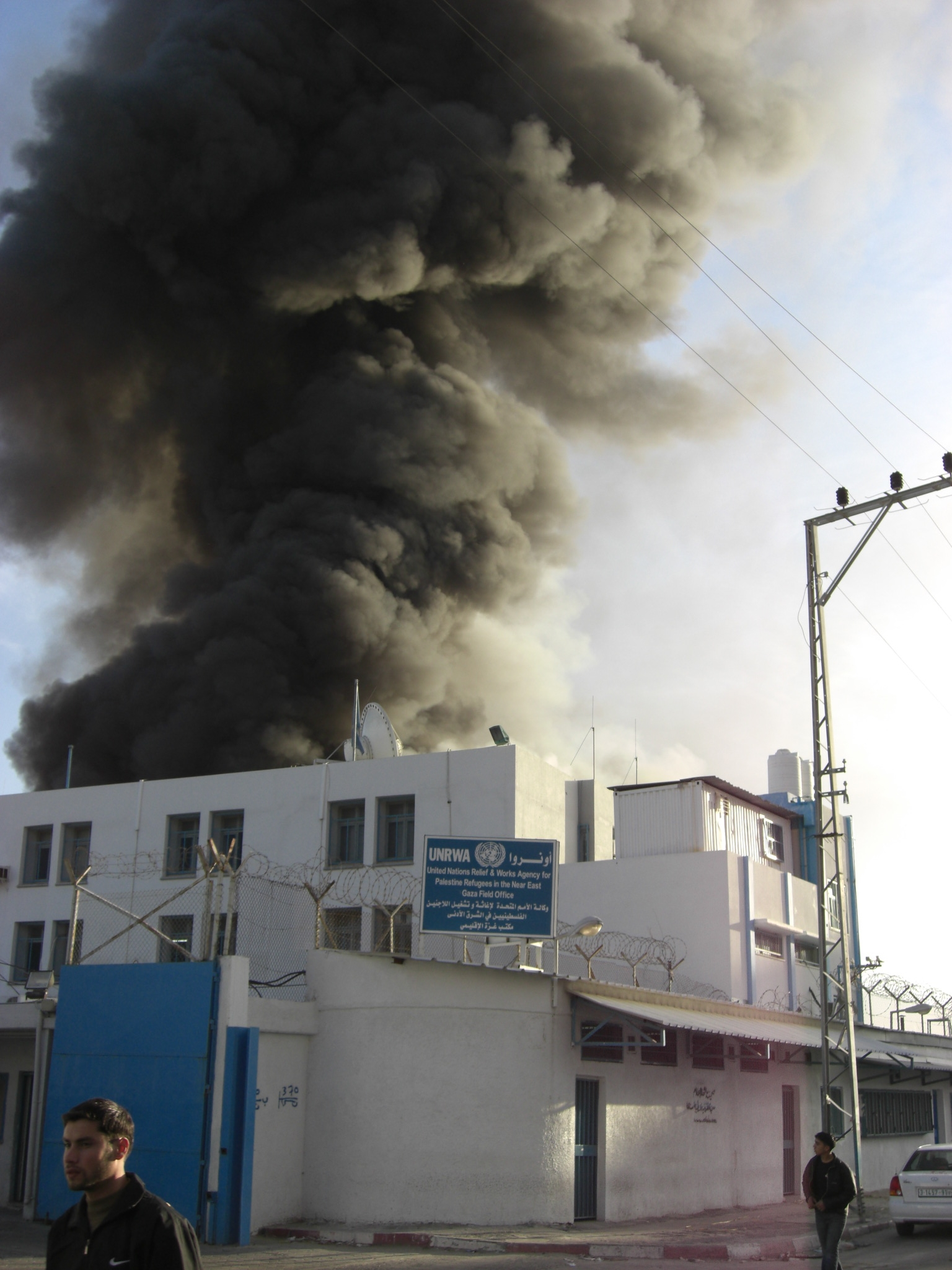
UNRWA building shelled by Israeli army, 15 January 2009

=== Al-Aqsa Intifada 2000 – allegations of Israeli interference with UNRWA operations ===
During the Second Intifada, which started in late 2000, UNRWA often complained that Israeli road closures, curfews and checkpoints in the West Bank and Gaza interfered with its ability to carry out its humanitarian mandate. The Agency also complained that large-scale house demolitions in the Gaza Strip left over 30,000 people homeless. Israel justified the demolitions as anti-terror measures.

=== November 2002 allegation that an Israeli sniper killed UNRWA employee ===
In November 2002, Iain Hook, a British employee of UNRWA, was shot and killed by an IDF sniper while working in the Jenin refugee camp, during an operation to locate a Palestinian militant suspected of masterminding a suicide bombing that killed 14 people earlier in 2002. Peter Hansen, head of UNRWA at the time, criticized the killing: "Israeli snipers had sights. They would have known who the two internationals (non-Palestinians) were. They did not dress like Palestinians."

=== 2003 ===
In 2003, Israel released to newspapers what the New York Times called a "damning intelligence report". Citing interrogations of suspected militants, the document claimed that UNRWA operations at the time had been used as a cover for Palestinian militants, including smuggling arms in UN ambulances and hosting meetings of Tanzim in UN buildings.

=== 2004 ===
The Israel Defense Forces released a video from May 2004, in which armed Palestinian militants carry an injured colleague into an UNRWA ambulance, before boarding with him. The ambulance driver requested that the armed men leave, but was threatened and told to drive to a hospital. UNRWA issued a plea to all parties to respect the neutrality of its ambulances.

On 13 May 2004, armed Palestinian militants threatened the lives of an UNRWA ambulance team, including a driver and a paramedic, and forced them to transport an injured gunman and two of his armed colleagues to a hospital in Gaza City, according to the agency.

=== 2009 ===
On 4 February 2009, UNRWA halted aid shipments into the Gaza Strip after it accused Hamas of breaking into a UN warehouse and stealing tonnes of blankets and food which had been earmarked for needy families. A few days later, the UN resumed aid after the missing supplies had been returned.

On 5 August 2009, the IDF accused Hamas of stealing three ambulances that had just been transferred through Israel to the UNRWA. The UNRWA spokesman denied the claim. A week later, Hamas confirmed it confiscated the ambulances due to bureaucratic reasons. A UNRWA spokesman also confirmed this but soon retracted this admission and denied the incident, even publicizing a photo it said was of one its officials with the ambulances.

==== Al-Fakhura shelling ====
On 7 January 2009, UNRWA officials said that the prior day, in the course of the Gaza War, the Israel Defense Forces shelled the area outside a UNRWA school in Jabalya, Gaza, killing more than forty people. The IDF initially said it was responding to an attack by Hamas gunman hiding in the compound, but upon reexamination, said that an "errant shell had hit the school." Maxwell Gaylord, the UN humanitarian coordinator, stated that the UN "would like to clarify that the shelling, and all of the fatalities, took place outside rather than inside the school."

UNRWA has consistently rejected the allegation that militants used the Agency's installations during the Gaza War in 2008–2009. These accusations have been published by some media outlets, although they are sometimes retracted. In 2012 when on two occasions, Israel Channel Two TV, the most popular network in Israel apologised and issued a retraction of these allegations.

=== Death of UNRWA staff member in Kalandia refugee camp ===
In August 2013, UNRWA released a statement that accused Israel of killing one of its staff members and injuring another in the Kalandia refugee camp during a raid. According to the release from 26 August 2013, "UNRWA deeply regrets to confirm that one of its staff members, a 34-year-old father of four, was shot dead by Israeli forces and killed instantly in an operation in Kalandia refugee camp in the West Bank at approximately seven o'clock this morning. Credible reports say that he was on his way to work and was not engaged in any violent activity. He was shot in the chest. Another UNRWA staff member, a sanitation laborer, was shot in the leg during the same operation and is in a stable condition."

=== 2014 Gaza war ===
During the 2014 Gaza war, there were many accusations by Israel and many rebuttals by UNRWA. For example, Israel's Channel 2 accused UNRWA of using its ambulance to transport militants. It retracted that accusation after being confronted with "incontrovertible evidence", in the words of UNRWA.

Also during the conflict, UNRWA spokesmen reported in July that weapons were found in three vacant UNRWA schools which had been closed for the summer. UNRWA strongly condemned the activity as a "flagrant violation of the inviolability of its premises under international law" and UNRWA staff were withdrawn from the premises.

Even though the claim of the booby-trapped UNRWA clinic proved to be false, it has been repeated on several occasions by vocal UNRWA opponents, including at an official hearing of the US House Committee on Foreign Affairs on 9 September 2014. During the hearing, "Hamas' Benefactors: A Network of Terror", Jonathan Schanzer from the Foundation for Defense of Democracies told the Committee that UNRWA was "allowing for the building of tunnels, these commando tunnels, underneath their facilities in my opinion very much needs to be investigated." It is unclear whether Schanzer knew he was misleading the Committee, though he also repeated the assertion at an event hosted by the Foundation for Defense of Democracies entitled "The Israeli–Palestinian Conflict" on 13 August 2014, where he stated there was "at least one booby-trapped tunnel under one of its facilities."

Israel damaged or destroyed a number of UNRWA facilities, saying that they were used for war purposes and thus legitimate targets. According to a UN report, Israel struck seven Gaza shelters, which led to at least 44 Palestinians killed and at least 227 injured. It also said Palestinian groups stored weapons in three schools and likely fired rockets from two of them. UN Secretary-General Ban Ki-moon condemned the use of shelters as weapons depots.

UNRWA schools and personnel were in the line of fire during the war, even as 290,000 people were staying in UNRWA schools being used as shelters.

During one of the many ceasefires in the war, UNRWA announced nine UNRWA staff members were killed in Israeli shelling of shelters.

=== 2017 calls for dismantlement ===
In June 2017, UNRWA employees discovered a tunnel running underneath the Maghazi Elementary Boys A&B School and the Maghazi Preparatory Boys School. According to an UNRWA spokesperson, the tunnel had no entry points in the school premises, but ran underneath the school. UNRWA stated it intended to seal the tunnel. Hamas denied it was involved, and requested clarifications from other armed factions that denied involvement as well.

Following the tunnel discovery, Israel's prime minister Benjamin Netanyahu stated that UNRWA should be dismantled and reincorporated in other UN agencies. In response, UNRWA's spokesperson said only the United Nations General Assembly could change UNRWA's mandate, and further stated in Hebrew on Israeli radio that if "UNRWA is gone" from Gaza then "two million people will turn into IS (Islamic State) supporters".

The peace initiative between Israel and Palestine promoted by the Trump Administration, and overseen by Jared Kushner, advocated the winding down of UNRWA through a campaign to disrupt it, and aimed to strip Palestinians of their refugee status, according to emails leaked to Foreign Policy. According to Kushner, UNRWA "perpetuates a status quo, is corrupt, inefficient and doesn't help peace". Both Kushner and Nikki Haley proposed a cut off of US funding for the organization, a proposal opposed by the State Department, the Pentagon, and the US intelligence community, on the grounds that any such move would only fuel violence in the Middle East.

=== 2020 allegations of pressure from Israel and pro-Israel groups ===
In January 2020, UNRWA said that Israel was building schools and institutions in occupied East Jerusalem meant "to compete" with its mission and drive it out of its area of responsibility under United Nations rules. UNRWA also initially said that Israel and the United States were "advocating against funding UNRWA in the European parliaments and elsewhere", but later clarified that it was referring to pro-Israel groups and "had no reason to believe that the U.S. was engaged in lobbying to stop funding the agency".

== Gaza war ==
Countries that had paused UNRWA funding as of 31 January 2024 Major donors that have suspended funding Minor donors that have suspended funding Major donors that have not currently suspended funding

On 4 January 2024, Israel Hayom reported Knesset members were seeking to halt global funding for UNRWA, with MK Sharren Haskel stating they sought "to stop funds which are being transferred from various countries to this organization, and remove UNRWA's mask". On 6 January, Noga Arbell, a political strategy researcher and former evaluator at the Center for Political Research of the Ministry of Foreign Affairs, stated her opinion that, "It will not be possible to win the war if we do not destroy UNRWA. And this destruction must begin immediately".

On 17 January 2024, UNRWA had already announced the creation of an independent Review Group to be led by Catherine Colonna, former French Minister of Foreign Affairs, to assess whether the Agency is doing everything within its power to ensure neutrality and to respond to allegations of serious breaches when they are made. The report, published on April 22, stated that UNRWA's neutrality had sometimes been undermined by the use of its facilities for military and political gains and that Israel had not provided evidence of claims that significant numbers of UNRWA employees are members of terrorist organisations.

However, the independent review panel under Catherine Colonna had only been tasked to review UNRWA's neutrality. It had not been appointed to investigate Israeli allegations that UNRWA staff participated in the October 7, 2023 attacks. Antonio Guterres ordered that investigation to be carried out by the United Nations Office of Internal Oversight Services.

On 26 January 2024, UNRWA said that Israel had provided the agency with information alleging that twelve of its employees had participated in the October 7 attacks; the agency announced that they would fire the employees in question and referred them for criminal investigation. According to Israel, these employees participated in massacres. Following Israel's allegations, several major donor countries suspended their funding—including its largest donors, the United States and European Union—pending further investigations. Several international organisations, such as the World Health Organization and Doctors Without Borders, stated that the "cruel" decision to suspend funding would exacerbate the humanitarian situation in Gaza caused by the Israeli invasion. In response, several Western countries—including Spain, Portugal, Ireland, and Poland—increased their funding of UNRWA. By 1 March 2024, the EU restored and increased its funding, and subsequently Australia, Austria, Canada, Italy, Japan, Sweden and Finland announced they would resume funding. On 23 March 2024, the U.S. extended its suspension of UNRWA funding until March 2025.

Michael Fakhri, the United Nations Special Rapporteur on the Right to Food, said on X that a day after the International Court of Justice, the principal judicial organ of the United Nations, "concluded that Israel is plausibly committing genocide in Gaza, some states decided to defund UNRWA for the alleged actions of a small number of employees. This collectively punishes +2.2 million Palestinians." According to an unverified Israeli intelligence dossier, shared with media organizations, 10% of UNRWA's 12,000 staff in Gaza have links to Hamas militants. However, as of 1 February, the information had not been shared with the UN. Experts said that the Israeli claims remain unconfirmed, and Palestinians have accused Israel of "falsifying information" to tarnish the UN agency.

In June 2024, more than 100 family victims of the October 7 attacks filed a lawsuit in New York for $1 billion in damages against UNRWA, accusing the organization of aiding Hamas and letting them use its facilities. In November 2024, UNRWA stated that Israeli military tanks had destroyed their office in Nur Shams refugee camp in the West Bank, which the IDF denied.

Germany in November 2023 froze funding for UNRWA following findings indicating that UNRWA's teaching materials were glorifying Jihad and teaching hate and antisemitism. US Congress also reviewed its continued funding of UNRWA.

=== Accusations of UNRWA facility misuse ===
A hostage released during the 2023 Gaza war ceasefire who was held for nearly 50 days in Gaza, claimed that he was held captive in an attic of an UNRWA teacher's home. UNRWA said that it is aware of the claims and is investigating it.

British-Israeli hostage Emily Damari, who was kidnapped from her home in a kibbutz and lost two fingers after being shot in the hand and leg on October 7, 2023, told UK Prime Minister Keir Starmer that she had been held in multiple UNRWA facilities and denied medical care during her 15-month captivity.

The IDF claimed to have uncovered assault rifles, ammunition, grenades and missiles with varying capacities of Hamas, hidden in and underneath UNRWA institutions.

On 10 February 2024, the IDF said it had uncovered a tunnel allegedly used by Hamas underneath UNRWA's main headquarters in Gaza. One chamber contained computer servers, while a separate one housed stacks of industrial batteries. According to the IDF, electricity wires and communication lines ran from the tunnel and were connected inside the UNRWA office building. Philippe Lazzarini said in response that "UNRWA did not know what is under its headquarters in Gaza". "UNRWA staff left its headquarters in Gaza City on 12 October," he added, "We have not used that compound since we left it nor are we aware of any activity that may have taken place there." However, the Wall Street Journal calls this response "Ostrich defense" and rejects Lazzarini's suggestion that such a sophisticated engineering operation could be completed after UNRWA had moved, in less than three months, amid Israeli bombardment. Gilad Erdan, Israel's UN Ambassador, called for Lazzarini's resignation, because he "didn't want to know".

The New York Times published an investigation into the Hamas presence in UNRWA schools based on the documents from the IDF and interviews with the current and former UNRWA employees. According to it, 24 directors and teachers working in UNRWAS schools belonged to Hamas and its presence in the schools was an "open secret" in Gaza.

=== Israeli killing of UNRWA staff ===
As of 22 October 2025, 360 UNRWA employees in the Gaza Strip were killed since the beginning of hostilities.

In August 2024, UNRWA stated that 207 of its staff members had been killed in Gaza since the beginning of the conflict in October 2023.

== 2024 allegations ==
Since 2011, UNRWA has regularly supplied Israel with lists of its employees in order that Israel might be able to vet its staff. Until January 2024, Israel had never expressed any concerns about UNRWA's personnel based on these staff lists.

A few days prior to 26 January Israel presented allegations to UNRWA saying that twelve employees had been involved with the 7 October attacks; reportedly some had been identified based on footage captured during the attacks, while others had admitted to working for UNRWA under interrogation after being captured. According to Israel, while they had held information on this for some time it was only in the two weeks prior to the allegations emerging that they had connected this information with a second cache of intelligence which "solidified an assessment that the UNRWA employees had been involved in the attack"; this intelligence included footage taken by Hamas militants during the attacks.

According to Israel, there is a structural relation between UNRWA and Hamas, these twelve employees are just the "tip of the iceberg". Israel also alleges that UNRWA facilities and vehicles were used in the 7 October attacks. Israel said it has compiled a case "incriminating several UNRWA employees for their alleged involvement in the massacre, along with evidence pointing to the use of UNRWA facilities for terrorist purposes".

On 28 January, Israel Hayom reported that Israel had been in possession of the information for an extended time, but had declined to release it publicly as they considered UNRWA to be the only functional entity in Gaza, and that "without it the chaos would be even greater". According to Israel Hayom's sources, Israel is uncertain why UNRWA and the United States decided to act on the information now; they speculated that the US action might be because of the House Committee on Foreign Affairs hearing on 30 January "where even more embarrassing information about UNRWA will likely be exposed".

It was further reported by Reuters that the Israeli intelligence dossier accuses 190 UNRWA employees of being "hardcore" Hamas and Islamic Jihad militants, while overall 10% of UNRWA staff was considered to have some affiliation with those organizations.

=== Israeli dossier ===
From 29 January 2024, The Wall Street Journal, The New York Times, Sky News, and the Financial Times reported on an Israeli intelligence dossier that Israel had presented to the US, and part of which had been shared with them and other media. The dossier alleged that at least 12 UNRWA employees had been involved in the 7 October attacks and that about 1,200 UNRWA employees, 10% of UNRWA's 12,000 employees in Gaza, had links with Palestinian militant groups. Israel detailed individual accusations against UNRWA staff which were reported slightly differently in the various press articles.

==== Summary of allegations ====
The Wall Street Journal reported the accusations against individual staff as follows:

- That an UNRWA Arabic teacher and Hamas commander had allegedly taken part in the Be'eri massacre
- That an UNRWA social worker had allegedly been involved in taking the body of an Israeli soldier to Gaza and coordinated Hamas distribution of trucks and munitions.
- That an UNRWA teacher was affiliated with Hamas, had photographed a female hostage in Gaza, and worked with another teacher who carried an anti-tank missile in the pre-attack preparations
- That an UNRWA employee had allegedly established an operations room for Palestinian Islamic Jihad following the attack
- That Hamas had allegedly instructed three other employees, including an Arabic teacher, to arm themselves near the border
- That another elementary school teacher had allegedly crossed into Israel and was present in Re'im, an area where militants stormed a kibbutz, a military base, and a music festival

The New York Times reported the allegations against individuals somewhat differently:

- That seven of the accused were teachers at UNRWA schools
- That two worked at schools in other capacities
- That a clerk, a social worker, and a storeroom manager also participated in the 7 October attacks
- That ten UNRWA staff were members of Hamas, and an eleventh was a member of Palestinian Islamic Jihad
- That a school counselor from Khan Younis abducted a woman from Israel in collaboration with his son
- That a social worker from Nuseirat distributed ammunition and coordinated vehicles during the attack, as well assisted in bringing the dead body of an Israeli soldier to Gaza
- That an employee participated in a massacre that left 97 dead, possibly in reference to the Be'eri massacre

==== Intelligence gathering methods ====
The dossier said that Israel had gathered the intelligence information via signal intelligence, cellphone tracking data, interrogations of captured Hamas militants, and documents recovered from dead militants. The New York Times reported more specifics: that the dossier said that Israeli intelligence had traced the movement of six of the employees inside Israel through their cell phones. Others, according to Israel, had phone calls intercepted in which they discussed their participation in the attacks, while three others received text messages ordering them to report to muster points, including one who was ordered to bring rocket propelled grenades that they had stored in their home.

==== US intelligence assessment ====
In a 21 February 2024 article titled "U.S. Finds Some Israeli Claims on U.N. Staff Likely, Others Not", The Wall Street Journal reported on a US intelligence assessment which said it could not verify Israel's claims that 10% of UNRWA staff have some kind of "link" to militants but did it not dispute the accusations per se. It had "low confidence" in, but found "credible", claims about individual staff at UNRWA. In mid-April 2024 US Senator Chris Van Hollen told Nicholas Kristof that US intelligence had nothing to support Israel's claim that UNRWA is a branch of Hamas, a claim he dismissed as an outright lie.

==== Criticism of The Wall Street Journal article ====
On 28 January 2024, in an article titled "Details Emerge on U.N. Workers Accused of Aiding Hamas Raid", The New York Times reported on allegations made in an Israeli intelligence dossier about some UNRWA employees. On 29 January, in an article titled, "At Least 12 U.N. Agency Employees Involved in Oct. 7 Attacks, Intelligence Reports Say", The Wall Street Journal also reported on allegations made in the Israeli intelligence dossier about some UNRWA employees. On 30 January, Sky News also reviewed the Israeli intelligence report and reported on the allegations.

On 3 February 2024, on the Al-Jazeera English current affairs programme The Listening Post, Palestinian rights lawyer Diana Buttu opined that the "problem with these types of allegations is that they adopt the Israeli narrative without questioning or second-guessing it". Jeremy Scahill criticized The Wall Street Journal for publishing what he described as "unsubstantiated allegations".

In an internal email, Elena Cherney, the WSJ chief news editor, wrote that "the Israeli claims haven't been backed up by solid evidence", but that the WSJ continued to stand by its reporting on Israel's claims. WSJ reporters tried and failed to confirm the 10 percent figure.

==== UK media disputing Israeli intelligence ====
On 30 January 2024, Sky News published a report on the Israeli dossier that had alleged staff involvement with Hamas. According to Sky, the report alleged that six UNRWA employees had been involved with the 7 October attacks, but that "the Israeli intelligence documents make several claims that Sky News has not seen proof of and many of the claims, even if true, do not directly implicate UNRWA."

A page from the document obtained by the UK's Channel 4 News in Feb. 2024 that Israel provided to other governments, claiming that UNRWA employees were Hamas/PIJ operatives, but which did not detail any supporting evidence, if it exists.

On 5 February 2024, Channel 4 said that the six-page dossier contains no evidence to support Israel's claim other than a statement that "From intelligence information, documents and identity cards seized during the course of the fighting, it is now possible to flag around 190 Hamas and Palestinian Islamic Jihad terrorist operatives who serve as UNRWA employees. More than 10 UNRWA staffers took part in the events of October 7."

On 3 February, the Financial Times stated that Israel's intelligence assessment was based on smartphone intercepts and captured identity cards, and concluded that it "provides no evidence for the claims".

=== Footage ===
Israel released footage from 7 October showing a man identified as Faisal Ali Musalam Naami, an UNRWA worker, entering Kibbutz Beeri in a SUV shortly after 9:30 a.m. Naami alongside another person in the SUV is shown to lift and put the body of an Israeli into the trunk of his SUV before looting the belongings of dead Israelis. The Washington Post investigated the claims and confirmed that facial recognition is a match and requested two vehicle forensic experts to analyze Naami's social media photos and managed to capture partial views of a white vehicle which they identified as a 1993-1995 Nissan Terrano II identical to the vehicle used on 7 October in color, make and model and was from the same generation. On 16 October Naami, five of his children and one of his two wives were killed in an airstrike in Nuseirat. The Washington Post's attempts to reach out to Naami's relatives were unsuccessful. An UNRWA coworker, who spoke on the condition of anonymity, claimed that he did not know if Naami was a member of Hamas or of his participation in the 7 October attacks.

=== Response from UNRWA and the United Nations ===
On 26 January 2024, UNRWA Commissioner-General Philippe Lazzarini stated, "The Israeli authorities have provided UNRWA with information about the alleged involvement of several UNRWA employees in the horrific attacks on Israel on October 7." He further emphasized, "To protect the agency's ability to deliver humanitarian assistance, I have taken the decision to immediately terminate the contracts of these staff members and launch an investigation in order to establish the truth without delay", adding that "any UNRWA employee who was involved in acts of terror" would be held accountable.

Lazzarini refrained from disclosing the number of employees allegedly involved in the attacks or the nature of their alleged involvement. The US State Department reported the figure to be 12. António Guterres, Secretary-General of the United Nations, said on 28 January that accusations had been made against 12 specific employees, and that of those 12 nine had been fired, one was dead, and the identities of the other two were still being confirmed. In July 2024 the investigation by the UN Office of Internal Oversight Services concluded that 9 UNRWA staffers "may have been involved in the armed attacks of 7 October 2023" and their employment would be terminated. In 9 additional cases the evidence was insufficient to support their involvement and in one case no evidence was obtained.

Guterres also said he was "horrified by this news", and called the alleged activities "criminal". His spokesperson Stéphane Dujarric further stated that the UN chief had directed Lazzarini to lead an investigation to ensure swift termination and potential criminal prosecution of any UNRWA employee implicated in or aiding 7 October attacks. On 27 January, the deputy UN spokesperson stated, "UNRWA overall had had a strong record, which we have repeatedly underscored."

In a further statement issued on 27 January, Lazzarini described the decision by nine countries to suspend the agency's funding as "shocking" and stated that both people's lives in Gaza and regional stability depended on that support; he urged the nations to resume funding before UNRWA is "forced to suspend its humanitarian response". According to a 28 January statement by Francesca Albanese, the UN special rapporteur for the occupied Palestinian territories, the decision to suspend funding could be a violation of the Genocide Convention, and "overtly defies" the provisional rulings in South Africa v. Israel.

Chris Gunness, a former UNRWA chief spokesman, called on the Arab world, and in particular the oil-rich Gulf states, to fill the funding gap, saying that they are "making billions each day on oil revenues", and that a "tiny fraction" of that would resolve the funding shortfall. (Note: Gunness additionally called the situation a "coordinated political attack" on UNRWA by Israel, stating, "The Israelis have said they cannot win the war on Gaza unless UNRWA is disbanded. So what clearer signal do you want?") A UNRWA spokesperson said that the funding suspensions would result in it being unable to continue aiding Gazans by the end of February. On 29 February, the United Nations announced it still had not received any evidence from Israel to support its claims.

In June 2026, UNRWA dismissed an additional seventy employees in Gaza for safety and security reasons, but said that this did "not constitute in any way a validation of the claims made against them."

=== Allegations of confessions obtained under torture ===
According to February 2024 UNRWA report, Israeli officials detained and tortured UN staff, coercing them into falsely stating that agency staff had participated in the 7 October attack. The allegations of torture came from staff who stated they were forced to make confessions under torture and ill-treatment, including "beatings, sleep deprivation, sexual abuse and threats of sexual violence against both men and women" in Israeli detention. Detainees reported being stripped down to their underwear and forced completely naked. The report found that UN staff were "pressured to make false statements against the Agency, including that the Agency has affiliations with Hamas and that UNRWA staff members took part in the 7 October 2023 atrocities" through beatings, waterboarding, and threats to their families.

In a statement, the UNRWA communications director stated, "When the war comes to an end there needs to be a series of inquiries to look into all violations of human rights". The Israel Defense Forces stated it was investigating "complaints of inappropriate behavior".

In response to the report, the World Organisation Against Torture condemned Israel, stating, "Both torture and the use of any such information violates the UN Convention Against Torture".

UNRWA further alleged widespread physical and psychological abuse perpetrated by Israelis against detained Palestinians. On 5 March, Philippe Lazzarini stated, "The campaign against UNRWA is intended to shift the longstanding political parameters for peace in the occupied Palestinian territory set by the General Assembly and the Security Council, without consulting either body."

According to UN documents, since the start of the war there have been a large number of incidents of harassment by Israeli security forces of UNRWA in the West Bank. The alleged incidents included blindfolding and beating of UNRWA workers and long delays in the delivery of medical supplies.

=== Reactions ===
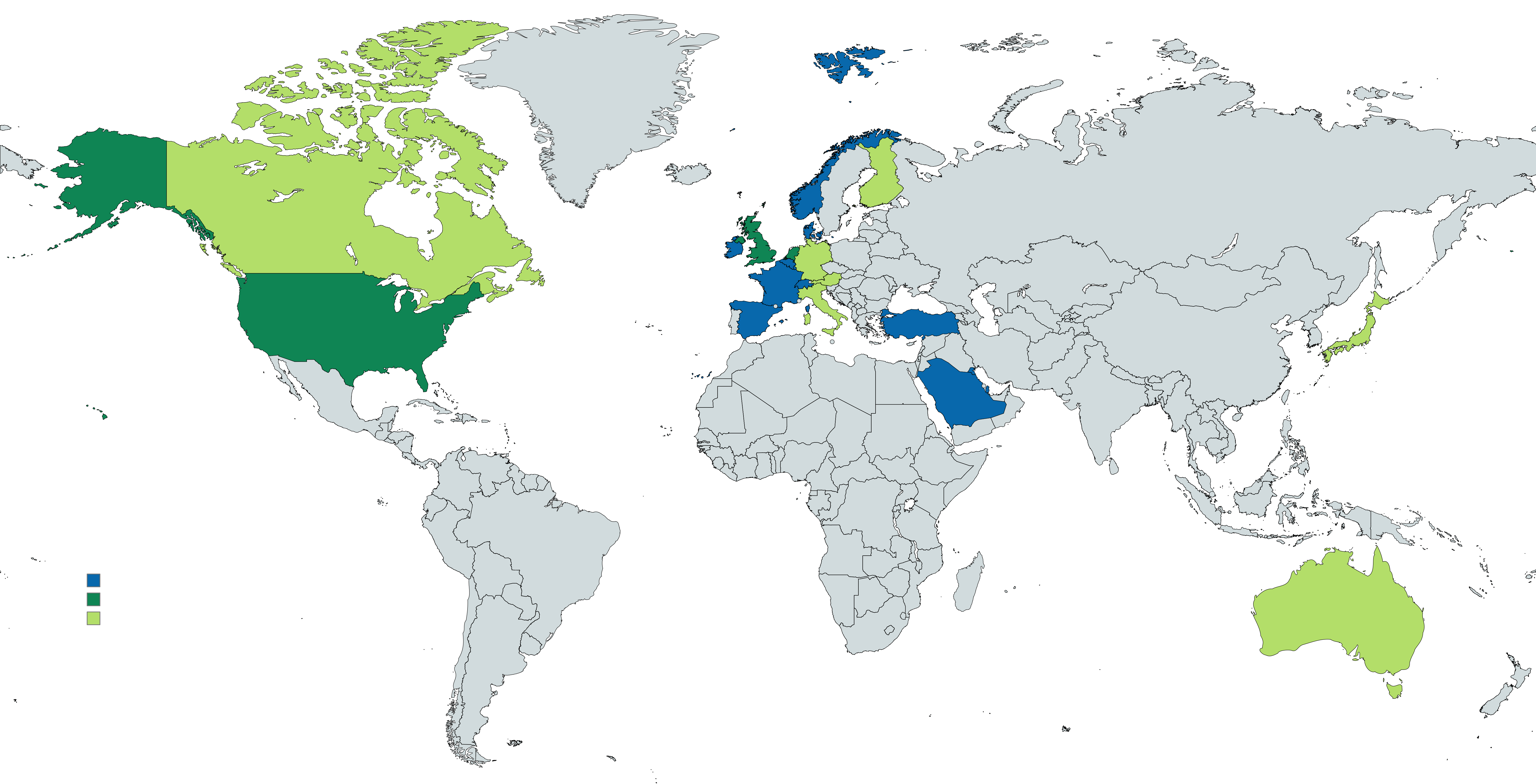
UNRWA funding status (June 2024) Donors that have suspended funding Donors that have restored funding Donors that did not suspend funding

==== Table of funder reactions ====
| | 2022 pledges | | 2024 status | |
| Country | Amount (USD) | % | Funding freeze announcement | Date of announced resumption, or funding increase |
|---|---|---|---|---|
| United States | 343,937,718 | 29% | 26 January 2024 | Funding freeze made permanent until 25 March 2025. |
| Germany | 202,054,285 | 17% | 27 January 2024 | Providing €45 million in new contributions for Jordan, Lebanon, Syria and the West Bank. Following publication of the Colonna review, announced on 24 April 2024 that it would resume funding. |
| EU | 114,199,150 | 10% | No freeze | 1 March 2024 |
| Sweden | 60,969,987 | 5% | 30 January 2024 | 9 March 2024 |
| Norway | 34,180,677 | 3% | No freeze | |
| Japan | 30,152,202 | 3% | 28 January 2024 | 29 March 2024 |
| France | 28,909,838 | 2% | No freeze | |
| Saudi Arabia | 27,000,000 | 2% | No freeze | |
| Switzerland | 25,534,028 | 2% | No freeze | |
| Turkey | 25,199,080 | 2% | No freeze | |
| Canada | 23,713,560 | 2% | 27 January 2024 | 8 March 2024 |
| Netherlands | 21,189,038 | 2% | 27 January 2024 | |
| United Kingdom | 21,158,281 | 2% | 27 January 2024 | 19 July 2024, announced £21m ($27m) for UNRWA. |
| Italy | 18,033,970 | 2% | 27 January 2024 | 25 May 2024, announced €5m for UNRWA and €30m for Gaza Food aid. |
| Denmark | 15,885,563 | 1% | No freeze | |
| Australia | 13,797,995 | 1% | 27 January 2024 | 15 March 2024 |
| Spain | 13,592,803 | 1% | No freeze (increased) | 5 February 2024 |
| Belgium | 12,558,653 | 1% | No freeze | |
| Kuwait | 12,000,000 | 1% | No freeze | |
| Qatar | 10,500,000 | 1% | No freeze | |
| Ireland | 8,509,726 | 1% | No freeze (increased) | 15 February 2024 |
| Austria | 8,091,406 | 1% | 29 January 2024 | 18 May 2024 |
| Finland | 7,807,565 | 1% | 27 January 2024 | 22 March 2024 |
| Luxembourg | 7,488,329 | 1% | No freeze | |
| Palestine | 5,760,830 | 0% | No freeze | |
| Other countries | 82,422,588 | 7% | | |
| All | 1,174,647,272 | 100% | | |
| Sum of frozen | 805,349,873 | | 65% | 45% |
| Sum of unfrozen | 286,874,811 | | 28% | 48% |

=== International community ===
Matthew Miller, spokesperson of the US State Department, said that "The United States is extremely troubled by the allegations that twelve UNRWA employees may have been involved in the 7 October Hamas terrorist attack on Israel." He further stated that the Department of State has temporarily halted additional funding for UNRWA as it conducts a review of the allegations and evaluates the actions being taken by the United Nations to address them. US Secretary of State Antony Blinken stated that the evidence implicating some UNRWA staff members in the 7 October attack against Israel is "highly credible". He emphasized the organization's "indispensable" role as a major humanitarian service provider in the region, adding that it is "imperative that UNRWA immediately, as it said it would, investigate; that it hold people accountable as necessary; and that it review its procedures". The United States later clarified that nearly all of the money that had been budgeted to UNRWA had already been sent, with the suspension affecting $300,000 of the 121 million US dollars that the US had budgeted for the UNRWA. The State Department also said they hoped the issue would be resolved quickly.

Following a UN Security Council meeting on 30 January, US ambassador to the United Nations Linda Thomas-Greenfield said: "There has to be accountability for anyone who participated in this attack on 7 October." US officials say that funding will depend on a credible investigation and acknowledge that there is no real alternative to UNRWA. White House National Security Council spokesman John Kirby said: "Let's not impugn the good work of a whole agency because of the potential bad action here of a small number". In February 2024, US president Joe Biden urged Congress to pass a bill which would ban the United States from funding UNRWA. In March 2024, US Senator Chris Van Hollen stated Israel's claims about a connection between UNRWA and Hamas were "flat-out lies" and that "Netanyahu's wanted to get rid of UNRWA because he has seen them as a means to continue the hopes of the Palestinian people for a homeland of their own".

Canada's Minister of International Development, Ahmed Hussen, announced that the Canadian government has temporarily halted additional funding to UNRWA pending investigation of the allegations. Hussen said he expressed Canada's deep concern directly to UNRWA Commissioner-General Lazzarini, adding that "Canada is taking these reports extremely seriously and is engaging closely with UNRWA and other donors on this issue". On 8 February, the Canadian government stated it had still not seen any evidence to support Israel's claims. On 5 March, the Canadian government announced it would resume funding to UNRWA.

Australia has declared a temporary suspension of its funding to UNRWA. Minister for Foreign Affairs Penny Wong stated that Australia will align itself with similar actions taken by the US and Canada in halting funding. She expressed Australia's deep concern regarding the allegations. Italy and Germany have also suspended funding to UNRWA. The UK Foreign Office released a statement, saying that the UK was "appalled" by the allegations.

Finland's Minister for Foreign Trade and Development, Ville Tavio, has opted to suspend Finland's payments to UNRWA in light of the allegations. He stated: "We must make sure that not a single euro of Finland's money goes to Hamas or other terrorists. The suspicion that employees of an organisation receiving humanitarian assistance are involved in a terrorist attack is the reason for suspending the payments. The case must be investigated thoroughly."

The Netherlands announced it will stop financing UNRWA, saying "We are extremely shocked. The accusation is that the attack was committed on October 7 with UN money, with our money." On 28 January 2024, France's Foreign Ministry declared that it will "decide when the time comes" regarding its funding, describing the allegations as "exceptionally serious".

On 29 January 2024, Austria announced it will also stop financing UNRWA, with the Austrian Foreign Ministry calling the UN agency "to conduct a comprehensive, swift and complete investigation into the allegations".

On 29 January, New Zealand's foreign ministry announced it would review its annual NZ$1 million funding to UNRWA in response to the allegations. On 30 January, Prime Minister Christopher Luxon announced that New Zealand would be suspending funding to UNRWA pending the investigation into the allegations. On 7 June, Foreign Minister Winston Peters announced that New Zealand would resume its annual NZ$1 million funding to UNRWA that month.

On 29 January, Latvia's Foreign Ministry announced via X (formerly Twitter) that the country has also suspended its funding to UNRWA.

The European Union announced that it was reviewing funding, and did not expect to provide additional funding before the end of February at the earliest. Josep Borrell, the European Union's High Representative of the Union for Foreign Affairs and Security Policy, said the European Commission would "assess further steps and draw lessons based on the result of the full and comprehensive investigation", urging UNRWA to "provide full transparency on the allegations and to take immediate measures against staff involved". On 1 March, the UN announced it was 50 million euros to UNRWA within the following week.

Norway and Ireland announced that they would not suspend funding for UNRWA. Norwegian Foreign Minister Espen Barth Eide said that "UNRWA is a lifeline for millions of people in deep distress in Gaza as well as in the wider region." Swiss officials said no decision would be taken until the "serious accusations" were clarified. The Icelandic Ministry of Foreign Affairs stated it supported UNRWA's swift investigation and that its "crucial work under the current dire circumstances must continue". Lithuania's Foreign Minister Gabrielius Landsbergis said that Lithuania has not yet reached the financial period for making funding decisions and is awaiting the investigation's results before taking any action.

On 30 January, Sweden also announced it would suspend funding for UNRWA. According to TT, Johan Forssell, Minister for International Development Cooperation and Foreign Trade, said that "The money… will go instead to other humanitarian organizations".

On 23 March 2024, as part of a package to fund the US government, the US cut all UNRWA funding until March 2025.

=== Criticism of cutting aid ===
Donor states have suspended funding at a time when the people of Gaza depend on critical aid from UNRWA for daily survival.

==== UN ====
Michael Fakhri, the United Nations Special Rapporteur on the Right to Food, said on X that a day after the International Court of Justice, the principal judicial organ of the United Nations, "concluded that Israel is plausibly committing genocide in Gaza, some states decided to defund UNRWA for the alleged actions of a small number of employees. This collectively punishes +2.2 million Palestinians."

UNRWA Commissioner-General Philippe Lazzarini stated: "Our humanitarian operation, on which 2 million people depend as a lifeline in Gaza, is collapsing. I am shocked such decisions are taken based on alleged behaviour of a few individuals and as the war continues, needs are deepening and famine looms. Palestinians in Gaza did not need this additional collective punishment." In a letter signed with humanitarian organisation leaders, UN Under-Secretary-General for Humanitarian Affairs Martin Griffiths stated that defunding UNRWA would lead to the collapse of Gaza's aid system, adding: "The world cannot abandon the people of Gaza". Former New Zealand PM and United Nations Development Programme administrator Helen Clark stated "this isn't the time to suspend funding".

An unpublished February 2024 UNRWA report detailing allegations of mistreatment in Israeli detention reviewed by Reuters said some employees released from detention alleged that they were pressured into giving false statements that UNRWA has Hamas links and that staff were involved in the Hamas attack on Israel.

==== Humanitarian organizations ====
Agnès Callamard, the secretary general of Amnesty International, stated that the world's richest countries had made a "heartless decision ... to punish the most vulnerable population on earth because of the alleged crimes of 12 people". Tedros Adhanom Ghebreyesus, the director-general of the World Health Organization, appealed to donors not to suspend funding to UNRWA and wrote that "cutting off funding will only hurt the people of Gaza who desperately need support". Tedros warned suspending funding would have "catastrophic consequences". Jan Egeland, the Norwegian Refugee Council head, called on donors to "not starve children for the sins of a few individual aid workers". In a statement, Doctors Without Borders said, "In the Gaza Strip, the humanitarian crisis has reached catastrophic levels, and any additional limitations on aid will result in more deaths and suffering."

==== European Union ====
On 29 January 2024, Josep Borrell, High Representative of the European Union for Foreign Affairs and Security Policy, told UN Secretary-General António Guterres that funding has not been suspended and the EU will determine funding decisions after the investigation. Borrell stated, "We shouldn't let allegations cloud UNRWA's indispensable and great work."

On 1 March 2024, the EU decided not to await the outcome of the UNRWA investigation, and instead put in place a €275 million funding package, being restoration of 2024 funding of €82 million, plus €125 million of humanitarian aid for Palestinians for 2024, which UNRWA is not excluded from implementing and another €68 million through international partners like the Red Cross and the Red Crescent. At the same time, the EU agreed with UNRWA reached an agreement with UNRWA on an audit to be made by EU appointed external experts.

Spanish Foreign minister José Manuel Albares stated on 29 January 2024 that Spain "will not change our relationship with UNRWA, although we are closely following the internal investigation and the outcome it may yield for the actions of a dozen people out of about 30,000" because the UNRWA is an agency "essential to alleviate the humanitarian situation". The same day, Spanish Social Affairs minister Pablo Bustinduy called out the suspension of UNRWA funds by other western countries "an unjustifiable collective punishment of the Palestinian people". In April 2024, Janez Lenarčič, the European Commissioner for Crisis Management, stated, "I call on the donors to support UNRWA – the Palestinian refugees' lifeline". Micheál Martin, the Irish foreign minister, stated, "If you undermine UNRWA and remove UNRWA you essentially remove the right to return".

More than a year later, in October 2025, it was revealed that Spain had threatened EU Commission president Ursula von der Leyen with blocking "other European Council decisions" if the European Union decided to block UNRWA funding.

==== Middle East and West Asia ====
The Turkish Ministry of Foreign Affairs released a statement that "Suspending aid to UNRWA due to some allegations against a small number of its members will primarily harm the Palestinian people."

Jordanian foreign minister Ayman Safadi stated that the people of Gaza "shouldn't be collectively punished upon allegations against 12 persons out of its 13,000 staff. UNRWA acted responsibly and began an investigation. We urge countries that suspended funds to reverse [this] decision."

The Pakistani Ministry of Foreign Affairs stated that it was deeply concerned by the cuts, since the people of Gaza "depend on critical aid from UNRWA for their daily survival".

Qatari prime minister Mohammed bin Abdulrahman bin Jassim Al Thani stated that the entire organization and its tens of thousands of employees should not be punished due to the acts of a small group.

==== Elsewhere ====
Chinese Foreign Ministry spokesman Wang Wenbin stated: "We call on the international community, especially major donors, to prioritize the lives of the people in Gaza, reconsider the decision to suspend funding, and continue to support the work of UNRWA."

Brazil's Ministry of Foreign Affairs asserted its confidence in the investigations by the United Nations Office of Internal Oversight Services, and rejects the idea that national should freeze funding to UNRWA due to Israeli allegations, especially at a time of severe humanitarian crisis in Gaza. It noted that funding halts also undermine the fulfillment of the International Court of Justice (ICJ) to ensure humanitarian access to the people of Gaza. It noted the deaths of 152 UNRWA staff in Gaza thus far, and renewed its call for a cease-fire, the release of the remaining hostages, an economically viable Palestinian State to include the Gaza Strip and all of the West Bank including East Jerusalem as its capital. A few weeks later, after Brazil's president Luiz Inácio Lula da Silva, whom Ha'aretz called "anything but an antisemite", called Israeli actions in Gaza a genocide, Israel declared him persona non grata and both countries withdrew their ambassadors.

=== Israel ===
On 4 January 2024, Israel Hayom reported Knesset members were seeking to halt global funding for UNRWA, with MK Sharren Haskel stating they sought "to stop funds which are being transferred from various countries to this organization, and remove UNRWA's mask". On 6 January, Noga Arbell, a political strategy researcher and former evaluator at the Center for Political Research of the Ministry of Foreign Affairs, stated her opinion that, "It will not be possible to win the war if we do not destroy UNRWA. And this destruction must begin immediately".

Israel's Foreign Minister Israel Katz stated that "UNRWA will not be a part of the day after", referring to the future of Gaza following the Israel–Hamas war. He added that: "We have been warning for years: UNRWA perpetuates the refugee issue, obstructs peace, and serves as a civilian arm of Hamas in Gaza. UNRWA is not the solution – many of its employees are Hamas affiliates with murderous ideologies, aiding in terror activities and preserving its authority."

Israel's Ambassador to the UN, Gilad Erdan, called on all donor states to suspend their support to UNRWA.

On 31 January 2024, during a meeting with UN ambassadors in Jerusalem, Prime Minister of Israel, Benjamin Netanyahu stated, "UNRWA is totally infiltrated with Hamas", and called for the replacement of UNRWA with other UN agencies and aid organizations. On 4 February 2024, at the start of the weekly cabinet meeting, Netanyahu stated: "We exposed to the world that UNRWA is collaborating with Hamas, that some of its people even participated in the atrocities and abductions of October 7. This only strengthens what we have known for a long time — UNRWA is not part of the solution, it is part of the problem. The time has come to begin the process of replacing UNRWA with other bodies that are not tainted by support for terrorism".

The New York Times reported 3 February that Israel did not expect the scandal to result in an international governmental reaction as Israel has long accused the UNRWA of bias and despite opposition to UNRWA some Israeli military officials did not want the UNRWA to be shuttered during a potential humanitarian crisis. On 23 February 2024, a group of Israel humanitarian organizations — including Doctors for Human Rights, B'Tselem, Breaking the Silence, Gisha, City of Nations, Checkpoint Watch, and Fighters for Peace — called on donors to restore UNRWA funding.

Following the resumption of funding by most UNRWA donors, Israeli officials expressed concern that the UK and the US might also restore funding, and acknowledged that the Israeli campaign against international funding for UNRWA has failed.

=== Palestinian response ===
==== Palestinian Authority ====
The Palestine Liberation Organization's Secretary-General Hussein al-Sheikh urged countries planning to withdraw funding from UNRWA to reconsider their decision due to significant political and humanitarian concerns.

==== Hamas ====
Hamas's press office stated via Telegram that the group implored the UN and international organizations "to not cave in to the threats and blackmail" from Israel, and accused what they called "the Zionist entity" of a "campaign of incitement" against UN agencies delivering aid to Gaza.

=== Media analysis ===
In an article published on 30 January, The Economist concluded: "It is hardly surprising that some members of an organisation that has been embedded in Gaza so deeply and for so long have links to Hamas. But that defence of UNRWA in turn raises difficult questions about whether it is sufficiently neutral, transparent and accountable. UNRWA is probably essential in the short term in order to avoid an even deeper humanitarian crisis in Gaza. Whether it should be an essential part of Gaza's long term future is far less clear".

The Intercept suggested that the timing of the resulting controversy was intended to distract media attention from the International Court of Justice ruling of provisional measures against Israel, issued on the same day.

An analysis in Haaretz stated that UNRWA is "riddled with Hamas", but called the freezing of funds an empty gesture, as foreign governments already knew of the situation. They suggest that just as Israel continues to work with UNRWA, foreign governments will restore funding out of necessity.

=== July 2024 list ===
A list of 108 UNRWA employees who were members of Hamas and PIJ according to Israel was sent by the Israeli Foreign Ministry to UNRWA.

=== Yahya Sinwar and the UNRWA passport ===
Following the killing of Hamas leader Yahya Sinwar in October 2024, Israeli media said that a UNRWA worker's passport was found near him. Commissioner-General Philippe Lazzarini rejected the allegation in a post on X, stating that it was "unchecked information" that was meant to "discredit" UNRWA. The document was an expired passport belonging to a man who had fled Gaza and was living in Egypt.

== 2024 Israeli legislation ==
In July 2024, the Israeli Knesset moved forward with the Law to terminate UNRWA activities in the territory of the State of Israel. The move was met with criticism abroad, with the European Union's chief diplomat Josep Borrell calling the move "nonsense" and a threat to "regional stability and human dignity". The US Department of State said the legislative push should be stopped and stated "the attacks that the Israeli government has leveled on UNRWA are incredibly unhelpful." In a joint statement representing the Nordic countries, the foreign ministers of Finland, Iceland, Norway, and Sweden stated they were "deeply concerned" by Israel's proposed legislation. The foreign ministers of UK, France, Germany, Australia, Canada, Japan, and South Korea stated that restricting UNRWA would have "devastating consequences on an already critical and rapidly deteriorating humanitarian situation" in the Gaza Strip.

The bills were passed by the Knesset on 28 October 2024, with UNRWA ordered to cease "any activity" within Israel-claimed territory within 90 days, and legal immunity removed from its staff. The bills as passed did not go as far as to designate UNRWA as a terrorist organisation as proposed earlier. The decision was widely condemned; Lazzarini stated that the bills "[set] a dangerous precedent", and "will only deepen the suffering of Palestinians, especially in Gaza where people have been going through more than a year of sheer hell".

=== International Court of Justice case ===
As a result of the ban on UNRWA, the UN General Assembly voted to request an advisory opinion from the ICJ regarding "Obligations of Israel in relation to the Presence and Activities of the United Nations, Other International Organizations and Third States in and in relation to the Occupied Palestinian Territory" in December 2024.

Hearings began on 28 April 2025 with Elinor Hammarskjöld, the United Nations Under-Secretary-General for Legal Affairs, declaring that Israel must comply with international law and cooperate with UN bodies. Blinne Ní Ghrálaigh argued that Israeli attacks on the UN were "unprecedented in the history of the organisation" and were "a fundamental repudiation by Israel of its charter obligations owed both to the organisation and to all UN members and of the international rule of law". Israel's foreign minister, Gideon Sa'ar, criticized the hearings saying that "it is not Israel that should be on trial. It is the UN and Unrwa".

In October 2025, the ICJ issued an advisory opinion finding that Israel's claims that UNRWA had been infiltrated by Hamas were unsubstantiated. The advisory opinion also said that Israel's decision to end cooperation with UNRWA and restrict humanitarian aid to Gaza breached its obligations under the Geneva Conventions and the UN Charter. It furthermore found that Israel's Gaza Humanitarian Foundation was not an adequate substitute, noting that more than 2,100 Palestinians had been killed near its distribution points and that conditions in Gaza had deteriorated to the point that international experts declared a famine in some areas in August. The ICJ further held that the mass transfer or deportation of civilians within occupied territory is prohibited, citing Israeli measures that forced large populations into overcrowded areas and severely restricted UN access. It also ruled that the two Knesset laws ending cooperation with UNRWA in the occupied territories were unlawful, noting that 360 UNRWA staff had been killed during the conflict. The court concluded that Israel, as an occupying power, had unlawfully impeded aid delivery, used starvation as a method of warfare, and failed to respect the immunities of UN personnel and premises. The opinion required Israel to allow UNRWA and other UN agencies to operate freely in the Occupied Palestinian Territories and to permit the International Committee of the Red Cross access to Palestinian prisoners held inside Israel.

== See also ==
- Hamas–UNRWA Holocaust dispute
- Israel and the United Nations
- UNRWA § Criticism and controversies
- Israeli apartheid
- Gaza genocide
