= European Foundation for Democracy =

EU lobbyist organization

- Abbreviation: EFD
- Formation: 2005
- Type: Association without lucrative purpose
- Registration no.: 70156146692-35
- Location: Brussels, Belgium
- President: Roberta Bonazzi
- Person in charge of EU relations: Roberta Bonazzi
- Budget: €442,974 (2018)
- Website: europeandemocracy.eu

The European Foundation for Democracy (EFD) is a policy centre and a registered EU lobbyist organization based in Brussels, Belgium. Its activities focus on counter-radicalisation, security and the promotion of the European values of democracy and individual freedoms. Its experts produce analyses and publications concerning the various threats coming from extremist ideologies, recommending measures and policies to counter these phenomena.

EFD also organises public events, policy briefings and roundtable discussions where relevant experts debate specific challenges posed by extremist forces, in order to stimulate the debate and provide the policy community with recommendations on how to tackle such threats.

== History ==
EFD was founded in November 2005. Documents registering EFD at the Belgian ministry of Justice date 24 May 2006. Its co-founders were Roberta Bonazzi, Nicola Dell’Arciprete and Miguel Papi Boucher. Dell’Arciprete previously worked on staff of an Italian MEP from right-wing Lega Nord, during which he participated in a tour hosted by Ateret Cohanim. On 15 September 2011, the organization was officially registered as an organization that works to influence the lawmaking process of the EU institutions.

== Projects ==
EFD works on a variety of projects in the following issue areas:

- Extremism and Radicalisation:
  - EFD was a contributor to PARTICIPATION, a project focused on research and preventive design, funded by the European Union’s Horizon 2020 research and innovation programme.
  - EFD was a partner in EUROGUIDE, developing an online toolkit for first-line practitioners in five European countries (Belgium, Italy, Hungary, Sweden and the Netherlands) to counter radicalisation and polarisation. Similarly, EFD participated in CICERO to develop and implement a counter/alternative-narrative communication campaign aimed at preventing radicalisation. Both projects were co-funded by the Internal Security Fund of the European Union.
- China, focusing on human rights violations against Uyghurs, relations with Taiwan, and Chinese influence on Europe through propaganda and misinformation.

== Activities and political stance ==
The EFD has campaigned on issues that echo policies advocated by the establishment in Israel, and it has been described as a pro-Israel group. The EFD's president denies allegations of being pro-Israel, saying "We try to not get involved in the Israel-Palestine issue.... We don't feel able to add anything. We don't think we can do it well."

EFD is an advocate of adding Hezbollah of Lebanon to the European Union's list of terrorist organizations, and has proposed a ban on television networks Al-Manar and Al-Aqsa TV by the EU. It has hosted events calling for a tougher action against Iran for its nuclear programme.

Scholar Farid Hafez maintains that the EFD hails from a politically conservative milieu, and its "fellows are located in the corridors of power", adding that "[t]heir experts produce knowledge for highly subsidized state institutions".

=== Allegations of Islamophobia ===
Academics Sarah Marusek and David Miller have written that the EFD is "closely associated with a transatlantic network of neoconservative and Islamophobic activists";. Narzanin Massoumi, Tom Mills and Miller have commented that the organization is "promoting a range of issues that include Islamophobia",. Farid Hafez has conducted a case study on activities of the EFD in Austria and Sweden,. Hafez claims works published by the organization put Austrian Muslim Youth (Muslimische Jugend Österreich) and Young Muslims of Sweden (Sveriges Unga Muslimer) under government pressure by falsely linking them to Muslim Brotherhood of Egypt. He states that EFD systematically produces works that follow a strategy of defamation and delegitimization of actors of the civil society of Muslims in Europe, by identifying them as radical and Islamist.

== Funding ==
EFD is described as an organization that enjoys support from several wealthy donors.

It has received substantial contributions from the United States government, for example out of EFD's declared €520,000 budget between January and September 2012, Some €70,000 was from Department of State.

Money raised by Friends of EFD annually
(in thousand dollars)
_{1002.5} / _{703} / _{983}; 2011 / 2012 / 2013	Total: 2688.5
Source: Cronin, Marusek and Miller

In 2009, Foundation for Defense of Democracies (FDD) provided a direct grant of $478,829 to EFD.

In addition, 'Friends of the European Foundation for Democracy' (Friends of EFD), a Washington D.C.–based tax-exempt organization is dedicated to raise funds for the EFD, which summed a total of $2,688,500 between 2011 and 2013.

Known co-funders of the Friends of EFD, and the amount of money they donated to the organization from 2009 to 2013 is as follows:

- Bodman Foundation ($50,000)
- Hochberg Family Foundation ($50,000)
- Marcus Foundation ($800,000)
- Foundations affiliated to Paul Singer ($1,000,000)

The Transparency Register data of EFD for 2018 fiscal year, declared zero funding received from national sources and local/regional sources, listing all of its budget coming from other sources.

== Ties to the Foundation for Defense of Democracies ==
According to Farid Hafez, EFD maintains organizational as well as financial ties to the U.S.-based Foundation for Defense of Democracies (FDD). The official website of FDD, as of 2007, stated that it works in a "partnership" with the EFD. Scholars Narzanin Massoumi, Tom Mills and David Miller argue that EFD actually "originates" from FDD, calling it the latter's "EU offshoot" and categorizing it among the "European-based neocon outfits... set up by US parent organisations". The two organizations also share the same major donors.

Roberta Bonazzi, the EFD's director said in 2014 that FDD and EFD are "two completely separate organisations, financially and legally separate"; however after being asked about US documents about a financial relationship between the two, replied: "that is because most of our fundraising is done in the US. [The FDD was] our contact. Grants were sent to them and then to us."
