= Mark Dubowitz =

South African-born Canadian-American attorney and venture capitalist

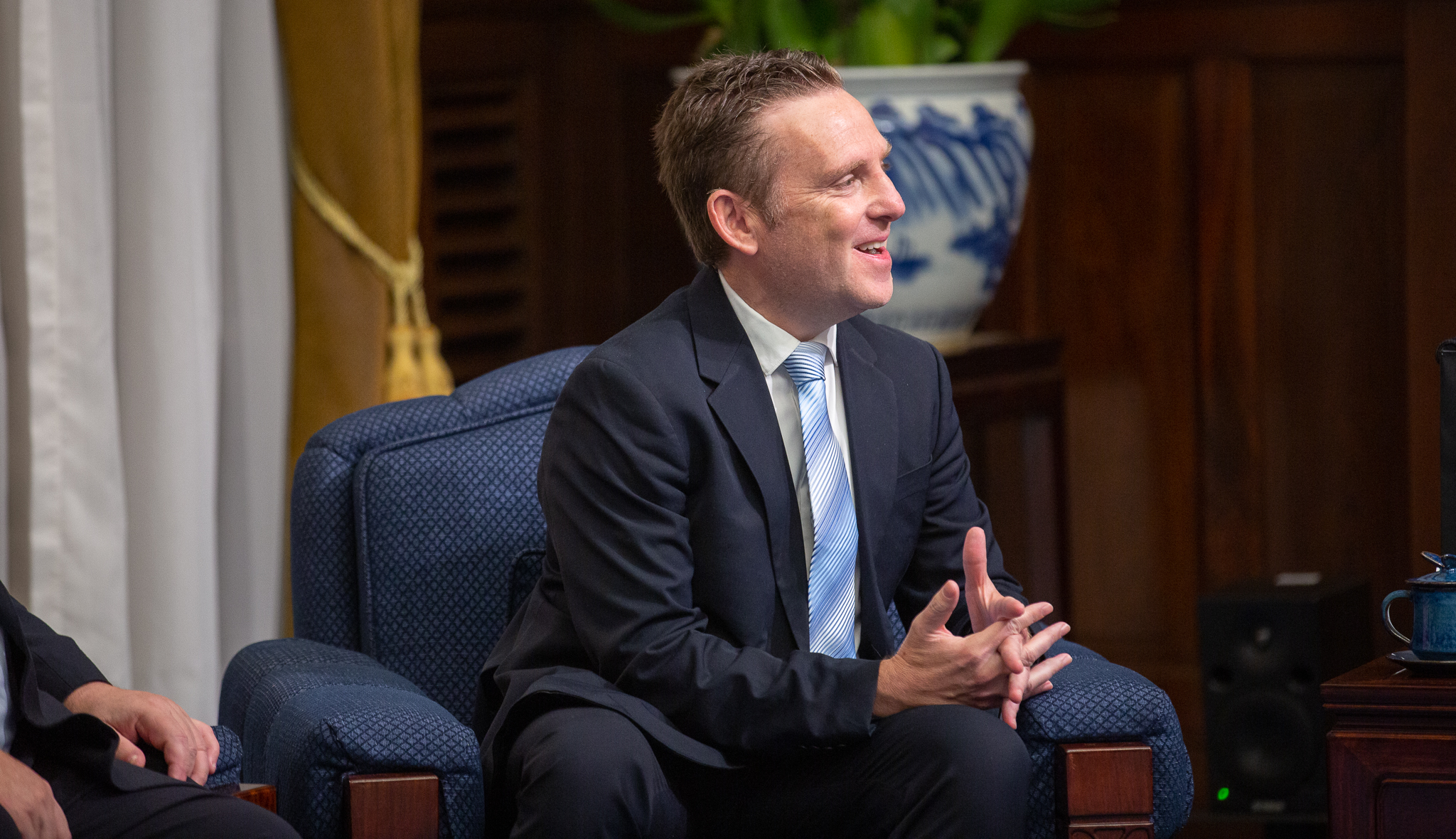
- Born: 11 September 1968 (age 58); Johannesburg, South Africa
- Education: Johns Hopkins University (MA); University of Toronto (JD, MBA)
- Occupation: CEO of the Foundation for Defense of Democracies

Mark Dubowitz (born 11 September 1968) is a South African-born Canadian-American attorney and former venture capitalist, and CEO of the Foundation for Defense of Democracies, a non-profit think-tank. He is a proponent of sanctions against Iran and was a leading critic of the Iran nuclear agreement, officially called the Joint Comprehensive Plan of Action. According to The New York Times, "Dubowitz’s campaign to draw attention to what he saw as the flaws in the Iran nuclear deal has taken its place among the most consequential ever undertaken by a Washington think tank leader."

He was a leading critic of the Iran nuclear agreement, Joint Comprehensive Plan of Action, but then tried to save it after President Trump withdrew from the agreement according to his own account.

== Early life and education ==
Dubowitz was born in Johannesburg in South Africa and raised in Toronto. In 2015 he became a citizen of the United States. He is Jewish and his great-grandparents fled the pogroms in the Russian Empire.

Dubowitz earned a master's degree in international public policy from the Paul H. Nitze School of Advanced International Studies at Johns Hopkins University, where he focused on China. He also earned a Juris Doctor and Master of Business Administration from the University of Toronto. He has also studied at Jerusalem's Hebrew University. He spent the first 8 years after law school working on funding technology start-ups in Toronto, as an attorney and venture capitalist in Toronto. One of the start-ups was DoubleClick, where he was the director of international business development.

== Career ==
Dubowitz is the CEO of the Foundation for Defense of Democracies. He co-founded FDD's Center on Economic and Financial Power and FDD's Center on Military and Political Power, and is the author or co-author of more than twenty studies on economic sanctions. He also is co-chair of the Project on U.S. Middle East Nonproliferation Strategy.

He joined the FDD in 2003 and became an authority on international terrorism and sanctions against states that sponsor terrorism such as Iran and North Korea. "I was a strange kid with an obsession with terrorism and plane hijackings. On September 11th it turned out that terrorism is not just an international problem, after it hit us at home," he told Ynet news. In 2003 I joined a small organization (FDD) despite not having any relevant political or policy experience and coming from a wholly different background."

In 2025, he started a podcast called "The Iran Breakdown" where he speaks with prominent voices on Iran to discuss and analyze the fundamental dynamics that shape the Islamic Republic. Notable guests included Reza Pahlavi, Crown Prince of Iran, Iranian activist Masih Alinejad, and urban warfare expert John Spencer.

Dubowitz is a lecturer and senior research fellow at the Munk School of Global Affairs at the University of Toronto, where he teaches and conducts research on international negotiations, sanctions, and Iran's nuclear program. In 2014, Dubowitz argued the U.S. and European sanctions against Russia were a warning, and not an attempt to reverse the occupation of Crimea quickly. In 2017, Dubowitz and Jonathan Schanzer co-authored a Wall Street Journal opinion article advocating U.S. recognition of Israeli sovereignty over the Golan Heights.

Iran's Foreign Ministry sanctioned Dubowitz and the FDD on 24 August 2019, alleging that they participated in designing, imposing, and intensifying sanctions against Iran. In a 2025 op-ed, Dubowitz and Ben Cohen argued that funding cuts to USAID would "bring accountability and efficiency", while preserving the soft power mission.

=== Opposition to Iran nuclear deal and Iranian government ===
According to The New York Times, "no one outside the Trump administration was a more persistent or effective critic [of the Iran nuclear agreement] than Mark Dubowitz". As a vocal critic of the agreement, Dubowitz has stated that it did not address Iran's non-nuclear malign activity, such as its misappropriation of economic relief to fund terrorism, and "its lack of any limits on the regime’s ballistic missile program and its 'sunset provisions' that would allow Iran to increase its capacity to enrich uranium beginning seven years from now." According to Politico, although Dubowitz "was an intense critic of the Iran deal," he "nonetheless advocated against scrapping it", instead stating that he wanted to fix it.

He told Ynet in 2011 that at FDD they "closely monitor international companies that do business with Iran, invest in Iran's energy sector and provide important equipment and technologies to this sector. They also monitor the movement of commercial vessels coming into and leaving Iran.

In 2012, Dubowitz said the US Sanctions were threatening Iran's oil wealth and rattling their economy. He criticised possible US sanctions concession, allowing foreign banks and governments to use the US-Dollar to conduct business with Iran in certain instances in 2016.

Dubowitz opposed the Obama administration's nuclear diplomacy with Iran, testifying before Congress on several occasions against the nuclear talks, including to the Senate Foreign Relations Committee (February 2014), Senate Banking Committee (January 27, 2015), House Financial Services Committee (July 22, 2015), the Senate Foreign Relations Committee (July 29, 2015), Senate Committee on Banking, Housing, and Urban Affairs (August 5, 2015), and the House Ways and Means Committee (November 4, 2015).

In June 2025, Dubowitz said that an International Atomic Energy Agency report showed that Iran was violating its obligations under the Nuclear Non-Proliferation Treaty and preventing investigations of possible nuclear weaponisation work. During the June 2025 conflict between Israel and Iran, Dubowitz said that Israel might lack the ordnance necessary to destroy Iran's underground Fordow enrichment facility and advocated U.S. assistance for an attack on the facility.

Dubowitz authored or co-authored several op-eds on the Iran deal, published in The New York Times, The Wall Street Journal, and USA Today.

=== Pro-Israel advocacy ===
Within the FDD, Dubowitz has advocated for strengthening the United States—Israel relationship through closer economic and military integration.

In September 2026, he wrote an opinion in Israel Hayom on the potential for Israel to be sanctioned by the United States, writing "Most importantly, Israel and the United States should deepen their military, technological, intelligence and economic integration to such an extent that inflicting financial harm on Israel would also carry a significant cost for Washington." Responsible Statecraft wrote that Dubowitz's article appeared to reference Section 219 of the House version of the 2027 National Defense Authorization Act (NDAA), which provides for the establishment of an executive agent charged with "synchronizing cooperative efforts" between Israel and the US across fields including quantum technology, biotechnology, AI, and weapons.
