= Foundation for Defense of Democracies =

Think tank and policy institute

- Abbreviation: FDD
- Formation: 2001; 25 years ago
- Type: 501(c)(3) organization
- Tax ID no.: 13-4174402
- Headquarters: 1800 M Street NW, Washington, D.C. 20036
- Location: Washington, D.C., U.S.
- President: Clifford May
- CEO: Mark Dubowitz
- Revenue: $23.9 million (2023)
- Expenses: $25.4 million (2023)
- Website: www.fdd.org

The Foundation for Defense of Democracies (FDD) is a neoconservative 501(c)(3) non-profit think tank based in Washington, D.C., United States. It has been described as a pro-Israel and anti-Iran lobby group.

FDD publishes research on foreign policy and security issues, focusing on subjects such as nuclear-non proliferation, cyber threats, sanctions, illicit finance, and policy surrounding China, Iran, Israel, North Korea, Russia, Turkey, and the war in Afghanistan.

In September 2019, FDD executives formed the 501(c)(4) organization FDD Action, which officially registered as a lobby under the Lobbying Disclosure Act of 1995 on November 15, 2019.

== History ==
FDD was founded in 2001 as "Emet" (אמת), which is Hebrew for "truth". In the initial documents filed for tax-exempt status with the Internal Revenue Service, FDD's stated mission was to "provide education to enhance Israel's image in North America and the public's understanding of issues affecting Israeli-Arab relations". Its mission broadened after the September 11 attacks in 2001. Later documents described its mission as "to conduct research and provide education on international terrorism and related issues".

John Mearsheimer in 2007, Muhammad Idrees Ahmad in 2014, and Ofira Seliktar in 2018 have described FDD as part of the Israel lobby in the United States. Sima Vaknin-Gil, director general of Israel's Ministry of Strategic Affairs, stated that the FDD works in conjunction with the Israeli government, including the ministry.

FDD opposed the nuclear agreement with Iran during the Barack Obama administration. It advised the first Donald Trump administration on ways to subvert Iran. Iran announced sanctions against FDD and its CEO in 2019. According to a 2019 article in The Atlantic, "no place else has made an institutional specialty of recommending hard-line Iran policies and offering detailed proposals for how to implement them the way the FDD has done".

In September 2026, FDD CEO Mark Dubowitz published an opinion piece in Israel Hayom titled "Israel must prepare for the possibility of financial warfare", advocating for increased integration with the United States to protect against economic sanctions. Dubowitz wrote, "Israel and the United States should deepen their military, technological, intelligence and economic integration to such an extent that inflicting financial harm on Israel would also carry a significant cost for Washington." FDD had previously supported the United States-Israel FUTURES Act, which would establish the United States-Israel Defense Technology Cooperation Initiative, subsequently incorporated into Section 219 of the House version of the 2027 National Defense Authorization Act (NDAA).

== Activities ==
=== Center on Cyber and Technology Innovation ===
The Center on Cyber and Technology Innovation (CCTI) conducts research and analysis to address cybersecurity threats to U.S. government, private sector, and allied nations while supporting technology innovation. The center analyzes adversaries' strategies and develops technological, governance, and policy responses. CCTI houses CSC 2.0, the successor organization to the Cyberspace Solarium Commission.

=== Center on Economic and Financial Power ===
The Center on Economic and Financial Power (CEFP) studies national economic security and the use of US economic and financial policy in relation to international security and geopolitical challenges. Its research focuses on how the United States government applies these tools in support of national objectives.

=== Center on Military and Political Power ===
The Center on Military and Political Power (CMPP) conducts research and analysis on defense strategies, national security policy, and military capabilities. Its work examines issues related to deterrence, geopolitical competition, and the security interests of the United States and its allies. Its senior director is Bradley Bowman.

The center was established in May 2019, and formally launched at the FDD conference "Rising to the Threat: Revitalizing America's Military and Political Power".

=== China Program ===
The FDD's China Program is a research initiative focused on analyzing and responding to the economic, technological, and security-related activities of the Chinese Communist Party and the potential threat they pose to US national security. The program draws on expertise across economic, military, technological, cyber, and political domains. The China Program is chaired by Matt Pottinger, who served as the Deputy National Security Advisor from 2019 to 2021.

In June 2023, a delegation from FDD joined by Israeli experts visited Taiwan and met with President Tsai Ing-wen. The delegation discussed mutual threats and asymmetric warfare strategies. In 2024, members of the China Program held a tabletop exercise in Taipei to examine China's economic and cyber-coercion against Taiwan.

=== The Iran Project ===
FDD's Iran Program is led by CEO Mark Dubowitz. Dubowitz and the FDD have been sanctioned by Iran for advocating sanctions against Iran and working to end the Iranian nuclear deal.

In 2008, FDD founded the Iran Energy Project which "conducts extensive research on ways to deny the Iranian regime the profits of its energy sector". The Wall Street Journal credited FDD with bringing "the idea of gasoline sanctions to political attention."

=== Nonproliferation Program ===
The FDD's Nonproliferation Program, led by Andrea Stricker, addresses issues related to the proliferation of nuclear, chemical, radiological and biological weapons, as well as their delivery systems. Its main areas of focus are nuclear non-proliferation, chemical weapons, biosecurity and pandemic preparedness, and long-range strike and weapons delivery systems.

=== Russia Program ===
The FDD's Russia Program, chaired by Clifford D. May, focuses on the study of Russia's foreign and security policy, including its interactions with governments such as China, Iran and other states of geopolitical interest. Its work addresses a range of Russian state activities across political, economic, military, cyber, and information-related areas; publishing its findings through research papers, analytical commentary, opinion pieces, and policy recommendations intended for the US and its allies.

According to analyses by the FDD and its Russia Program, the government under President Vladimir Putin has pursued activities that increase Russian influence abroad and challenge the US-led international order. The program has also identified strategic cooperation between Russia and countries such as China and Iran as elements of this approach. Analysts also note that Russia continues to employ political, economic, cyber, and information operations in its interactions with the United States and its NATO and European allies.

=== The Syria Project ===
For years, Syria has been a focus of FDD's research because of its alignment with Iran and support for organizations such as Hezbollah. In that effort, FDD facilitated a Skype call between dissidents and U.S. journalists in 2012.

=== Turkey Program ===
The FDD's Turkey Program is a research initiative, that conducts research on Turkey's domestic politics, foreign policy, and their implications for US national security – with particular attention to developments under the Justice and Development Party (AKP). Its researchers have examined sanctions evasion and illicit finance involving Turkey, including the use of Turkish gold exports in payments for Iranian energy. In 2013, FDD and Roubini Global Economics published research on a sanctions "golden loophole". Subsequent investigative reporting connected the trade to the sanctions-evasion network of Iranian-Turkish businessman Reza Zarrab.

In 2017, FDD chief executive Mark Dubowitz and senior vice president Jonathan Schanzer were selected as expert witnesses for US prosecuters in the federal prosecution concerning an alleged scheme to evade US sanctions on Iran. Dubowitz testified at the trial of Halkbank executive Mehmet Hakan Atilla as an expert on Iran and Iranian economic sanctions. Zarab, who had previously been charged in the case, pled guilty and became a cooperating witness for the prosecution. During the proceedings, Turkish prosecutors issued a detention warrant for FDD senior fellow and former Turkish parliamentarian Aykan Erdemir, alleging that he had supplied fabricated evidence used in the US case. Erdemir denied the allegations.

Atilla was convicted in January 2018 of five charges and subsequently sentenced to 32 months in prison. Zarrab was sentenced in July 2026 to time served. Following his cooperation with the US, Turkish prosecutors ordered the seizure of his assets in Turkey.

=== Long War Journal ===
The Long War Journal is an FDD project dedicated to reporting the "war on terrorism" launched by the United States and its allies following the September 11 terrorist attacks in 2001. Under the direction of FDD senior fellows Bill Roggio and Thomas Joscelyn, this website covers stories about countries such as Afghanistan, Pakistan, Somalia, Syria, and Iraq and follows the actions of al Qaeda and its affiliates. According to the Columbia Journalism Review, "Roggio's greatest service, then, may be the way he picks up where the mainstream press leaves off, giving readers a simultaneously more specific and holistic understanding of the battlefield", but "...there have been times when Roggio has done himself a disservice by aligning with bloggers who are more about pushing a conservative agenda."

When it was announced in October 2021 that President Joe Biden's top diplomat for Afghanistan, Zalmay Khalilzad, was stepping down, Bill Roggio of the FDD said, "It is about time he stopped stealing money from the US government. He shoulders a large amount of the blame for shilling for the Taliban."

== Funding ==
=== 2001–2004 ===
Money contributed to the FDD during first decade of its activity, based on calculations made by Christopher Bail, expanded by 442%.

In 2011, news website ThinkProgress published FDD's Form 990 documents that revealed the source of FDD's funds between 2001 and 2004. Top donors included:

- Roland Arnall: $1,802,000
- Edgar M. and Charles Bronfman: $1,050,000
- Michael Steinhardt: $850,000
- Abramson Family Foundation (of Leonard Abramson): $822,523
- Bernard Marcus: $600,000
- Lewis Ranieri: $350,000

Other notable donors:

- Haim Saban
- Jennifer Laszlo Mizrahi
- Douglas J. Feith

=== 2008–2011 ===
FDD's Schedule A documents filed by the end of the 2011 tax year, indicates that the organization from 2008 to 2011 received more than $20,000,000 in contributions and the top three donors were:

- Bernard Marcus: $10,745,000
- Paul Singer: $3,600,000
- Sheldon Adelson: $1,510,059

=== 2017 ===
In 2018, the Associated Press reported that the United Arab Emirates had wired $2.5 million to Elliott Broidy through a company in Canada and George Nader; Broidy then sent that money to the FDD to host a conference amidst Qatar diplomatic crisis about the country's role as an alleged state-sponsor of terrorism as part of his efforts to persuade the U.S. to oppose Qatar. FDD stated that it does not accept money from foreign governments, adding that "[a]s is our funding policy, we asked if his funding was connected to any foreign governments or if he had business contracts in the Gulf. He assured us that he did not".

Adam Hanieh states that the FDD high-profile conference of May 23, 2017, was in line with UAE's policy at the time, which officially alleged that Qatar financed Islamist groups, adding that emails leaked shortly after show that UAE's Ambassador Yousef Al Otaiba had a "cosy relationship" with the FDD, and had reviewed the remarks made by Robert Gates at the convention. The leaked emails revealed a backchannel cooperation built between FDD and the UAE.

=== Others ===
Additionally, as of 2016, FDD had received donations from the following institutions:

- Abstraction Fund
- Hertog Foundation
- Jacobson Family Foundation
- Klarman Family Foundation
- Koret Foundation
- Milstein Family Foundation
- Nathan Seter Foundation
- Newton and Rochelle Becker Charitable Trust
- Snider Foundation
- Hochberg Family Foundation
- Marcus Foundation
- Bodman Foundation
- Emerson Family Foundation
- Eris & Larry Field Family Foundation
- Rita & Irwin Hochberg Family Foundation
- Anchorage Charitable Fund
- William Rosenwald Family Fund
- Lynde and Harry Bradley Foundation

== Personnel and leadership ==
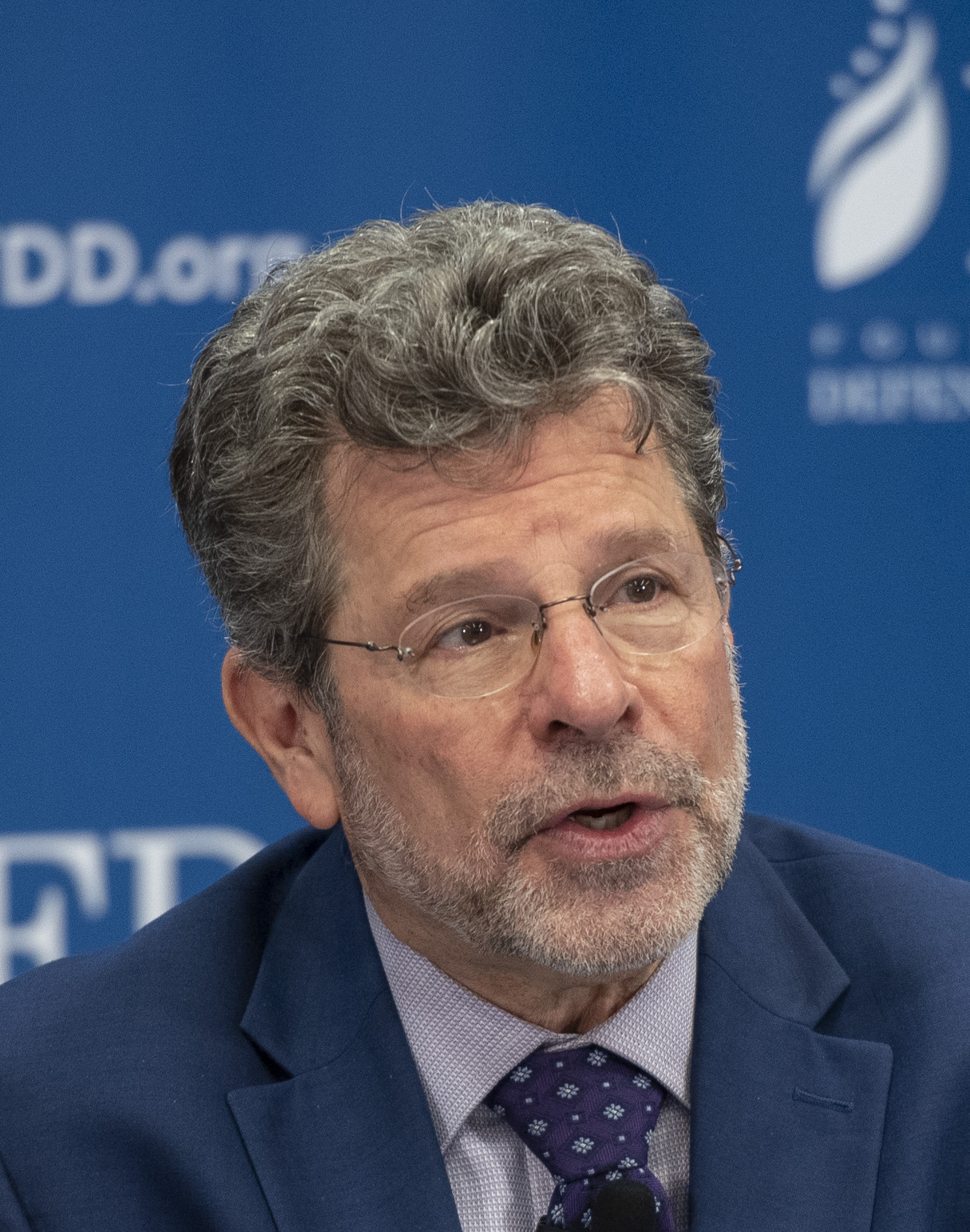
Clifford May, FDD's founder and current president

=== Executives ===
- Clifford May, founder and president
- Mark Dubowitz, CEO
- Bill McCarthy, COO
- Jonathan Schanzer, executive director

=== Advisors and notable fellows ===
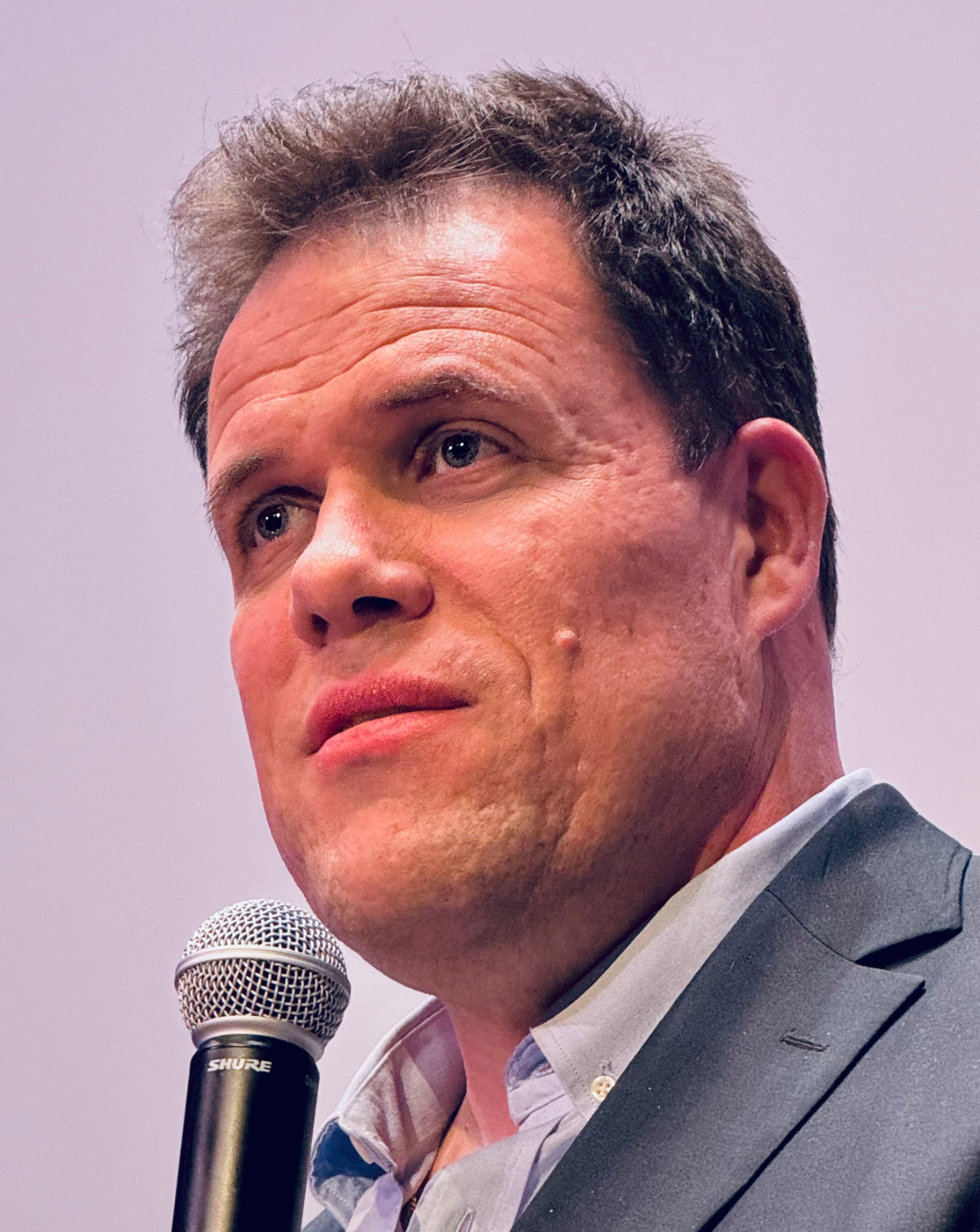
Jonathan Conricus

- Jonathan Conricus
- Eric S. Edelman
- Amir Eshel
- Daveed Gartenstein-Ross
- Bonnie Glick
- Orde Kittrie
- H. R. McMaster
- Cleo Paskal
- Matt Pottinger

== Reception ==
The American political blog ThinkProgress criticized FDD for what it called "alarmist rhetoric and fear mongering", for example in April 2002 when they aired a 30-second television ad campaign called "Suicide Strategy" that was described by some critics as "conflating" Palestine Liberation Organization (PLO) leader Yasser Arafat with the likes of Osama bin Laden and Saddam Hussein. As FDD explained it: "a militant Islamic terrorist who 'martyrs' himself by hijacking a plane and flying it into the World Trade Center"—referring to the September 11 attacks—"is no different from a militant Islamic terrorist who 'martyrs' himself by strapping explosives to his body and walking into a hotel"—i.e., Palestinian suicide attacks.

In 2017, journalist Bari Weiss of The New York Times reported on dissent within the organization over the pro-Trump orientation it adopted following the 2016 elections, which included at least two employees leaving.

In 2018, Lawrence Wilkerson said the FDD was "pushing falsehood" in support of waging wars. In 2019, the Ministry of Foreign Affairs of the Islamic Republic of Iran designated the Foundation for Defense of Democracies a terrorist organization. Farid Hafez, researcher at Universität Salzburg, wrote in 2019 that FDD was one of the key organizations peddling Islamophobia in a transatlantic network.

The International Relations Center features a report on the foundation on its "Right Web" website, a program of the think tank Institute for Policy Studies which, according to its mission statement, seeks to "check the militaristic drift of the country". The report states that "although the FDD is an ardent critic of terrorism, it has not criticized actions taken by Israel against Palestinians that arguably fall into this category".

In 2023, The Intercept and LA Weekly alleged that FDD, along with other US-based think tanks, were coordinating a pressure campaign against the regional rivals of the UAE, including Iran, Qatar, and Turkey.

Christopher A. Bail, professor of sociology, public policy and data science at Duke University, describes FDD as an "anti-Muslim fringe organization" that has tried to establish itself as a legitimate authority on Islam and terrorism by tactically using "ethnic experts" —i.e. pundits with Middle Eastern background who were not Muslim— because they advocate views contrary to the mainstream perspective of the Muslim community in the United States, but look like and talk like Muslims. Sarah Marusek, research fellow at University of Johannesburg, argues that FDD is one of the "key organizations peddling Islamophobia" in a "transatlantic network". Farid Hafez, researcher at Universität Salzburg, says the same.

== See also ==
- European Foundation for Democracy#Ties to the Foundation for Defense of Democracies
