= Clifford May =

American journalist and political activist (born 1951)

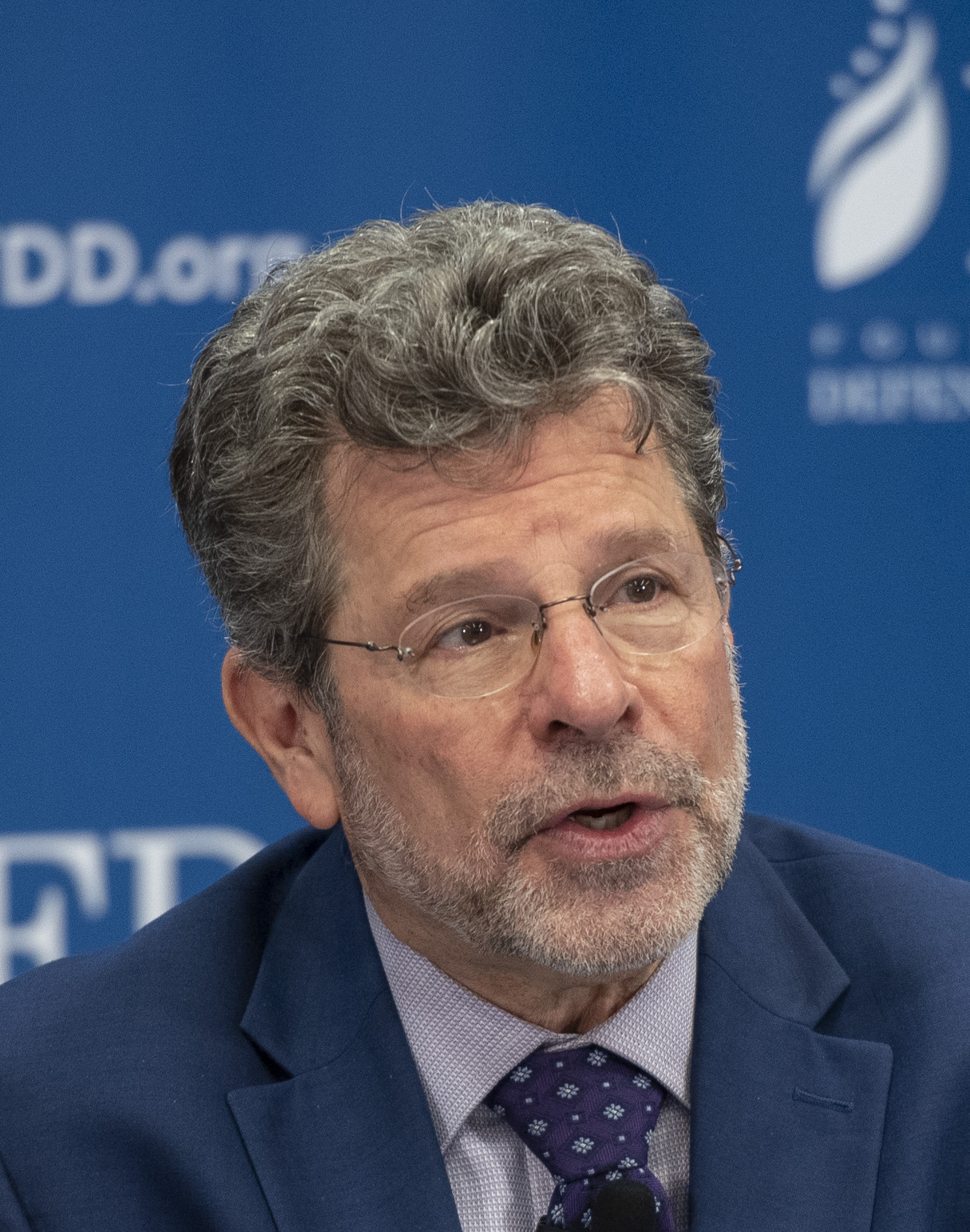
- May in 2020
- Born: 1951 (age 74–75)
- Education: Sarah Lawrence College (BA); Columbia University (MPA, MS)
- Occupations: Journalist; author; activist; podcaster
- Years active: 1975–present
- Employer: Foundation for Defense of Democracies

Clifford D. May (born 1951) is an American journalist, editor, political activist, and podcast host. He is the founder and president of the Foundation for Defense of Democracies, a think tank created shortly after the 9/11 attacks, where he hosts the podcast Foreign Podicy. He is the weekly "Foreign Desk" columnist for The Washington Times.

May previously served as commissioner on the United States Commission on International Religious Freedom (USCIRF), an independent, bipartisan U.S. federal government commission that makes policy recommendations concerning international religious freedom, as well as the Chairman of the Policy Committee department within the Committee on the Present Danger. May was also previously a weekly columnist for Scripps Howard News Service and National Review Online. May has been widely published, including in The Wall Street Journal, National Review, Commentary, USA Today, and The Atlantic. He has served as a reporter, a foreign correspondent, and a newspaper/magazine editor, working notably for Newsweek in the 1970s and for The New York Times in the 1980s.

May is also a member of the Henry Jackson Society. In October 2007, The Daily Telegraph named May number 94 in its list of the "100 most influential conservatives in America", identifying him as a neo-conservative within the Republican Party.

== Career ==
=== Early career ===
May earned a Bachelor of Arts degree from Sarah Lawrence College in Bronxville, New York in 1973. He then earned master's degrees from both Columbia University's School of Public and International Affairs and its School of Journalism. In addition, he holds a certificate in Russian language and literature from Leningrad University. May worked as an associate editor of Newsweek from 1975 to 1978. He then became a foreign correspondent for Hearst newspapers and worked for CBS Radio News and Bill Moyers' Journal on PBS as well. For all three outlets, he covered the Iranian Revolution in 1979. Returning to the U.S., he became senior editor of Geo Magazine.

May then spent about a decade with The New York Times serving as an editor of the Sunday magazine, a New York City and Washington reporter and as a foreign correspondent. He opened the Times' West Africa bureau and worked as its chief. He then moved to Denver, Colorado to be associate editor of the Rocky Mountain News. He started writing a weekly political and social criticism column that was distributed nationally by Scripps Howard News Service. He also hosted two weekly television programs and a talk radio show around this time.

=== Later career ===
May served as the Director of Communications for the Republican National Committee from 1997 to 2001. In his position, he oversaw activities such as strategic planning, press, radio, television, online services, speech writing, and advertising. He worked as the editor of Rising Tide, the official Republican Party magazine. He also was the vice chairman of the Republican Jewish Coalition.

After leaving the RNC, he became a director in the Washington, D.C. office of BSMG Worldwide, a public affairs and public relations company. In 2006, he was appointed an adviser to the Iraq Study Group. He strongly dissented from the recommendations that the group came to, and he then worked with various groups to oppose the policies. On July 11, 2008, May was nominated by President George W. Bush to be a member of the Broadcasting Board of Governors for a term expiring August 13, 2009. "In this very challenging period of history, it is vital that the United States communicates with audiences abroad clearly and creatively,” May said, “I will be honored and privileged if I can assist with this mission.”

== Views and opinions ==
=== Issue positions ===
May is an International Patron of the Henry Jackson Society. In October 2007, The Daily Telegraph named May number 94 in its list of the "100 most influential conservatives in America", and labeled him "an outspoken proponent of the need to achieve victory in Iraq and the broader war against Muslim extremism". It also described him as a "nimble" Republican Party activist in the American media.

May supports the use of enhanced interrogation techniques, other than waterboarding, against those captured by the United States in what he calls the war on terror, so long as they are used as a "last resort"; he views them as fundamentally different from torture. He also opposes regarding those captured as either criminal defendants or prisoners of war. On April 23, 2009, May appeared on The Daily Show with Jon Stewart discussing the subject of torture, and he and Stewart engaged in a rather heated yet cordial debate on the subject. Jacob Gershman of New York later highlighted the exchange as one of the clearest discussions about the issue in the news media.

May supported the 2003 invasion of Iraq as well as the Iraq War troop surge of 2007. In March 2008, he wrote for National Review Online that "[w]hat one can not say is that regime change in Iraq was unjustified: Not if you know Saddam's record, his clearly stated intentions, and his ties to international terrorists—including, as a new Pentagon report reveals, a group headed by Ayman al-Zawahiri, now al Qaeda’s second-in-command." In an April 2004 interview with Tavis Smiley, who alleged that George W. Bush had decided to invade Iraq before the 9/11 attacks and manipulated the intelligence links on Iraq and weapons of mass destruction, May argued that Bush had been continuing the policy of the Bill Clinton-era Iraq Liberation Act and that Bush had pushed the CIA for accurate information. May told Smiley: "I'm rooting for the guy in the White House, personally, 'cause I do think he has done a good job". In the aftermath of the American re-deployment in Iraq during July 2009, he wrote for The Washington Times that "[t]he news is not that American combat troops withdrew from Iraqi cities. The news is that American combat troops withdrew from Iraqi cities in victory—rather than in defeat."

In October 2012, May wrote for the San Angelo Standard Times that, despite the death of Osama bin Laden and other successes against al-Qaida, he considered the group "degraded" but not actually "defeated"; he referred to the attempted assassination of Malala Yousafzai as a particular sign of a still dangerous Taliban. He argued that "Roosevelt and Churchill grasped what too many analysts in government, academia, media and think tanks do not: To prevail against America's 21st century enemies, kinetic warfare is necessary but insufficient. An ideological war, a war of ideas, also must be waged. And on that front, we have not yet begun to fight."

=== Disputes, debates, and criticism ===
During the beginning of the 2003 CIA leak scandal, May wrote that an ex-administration official had told him that Valerie Plame was a CIA agent, and May stated that the fact was an open secret widely known across Washington, D.C. He also remarked that he chose not to mention this in his own writings since he considered this to be irrelevant to anything else. David Corn, writing for The Nation in March 2007 in the aftermath of the scandal, disputed May's assertions, and he quoted Plame as saying that only a handful of people knew about her covert status. Corn then called upon May, along with other conservative commentators such as Jonah Goldberg who had made similar statements, to apologize.

On the October 15, 2007 edition of Tucker on MSNBC, May agreed with host Tucker Carlson's allegation that Hillary Clinton had used her gender to garner support in her Presidential campaign. May then jokingly referred to Clinton as a 'Vaginal-American'. The comment was highlighted by Media Matters for America. In September 2007, Media Matters for America criticized May for making numerous public appearances in support of the Bush administration without mentioning his relationship with Secretary of State Condoleezza Rice's Advisory Committee on Democracy Promotion or the fact that the Foundation for Defense of Democracies had received State Department monetary grants.

After Rush Limbaugh compared Barack Obama to Adolf Hitler in August 2009, Salon writer Glenn Greenwald stated on his blog that May had called Limbaugh's commentary "wrong, outrageous and damaging". May wrote at National Review Online shortly afterward that Greenwald had "[p]redictably" and "dishonorably" misrepresented the statement that he had e-mailed to Greenwald, which he said had criticized specious Nazi comparisons by both Limbaugh, Moveon.org, and Nancy Pelosi.

On December 31, 2009, May jokingly suggested releasing detainees from Guantanamo Bay to Yemen, then sending "missiles to strike the baggage-claim area". He later defended the remarks, describing critics such as Greenwald as "humorless". He also stated that he had intended to highlight the logical disconnect between someone both supporting the extrajudicial killing of suspected militants and opposing the holding of suspected militants at Guantanamo Bay at the same time.

== See also ==
- Members of the Council on Foreign Relations
- People associated with the Project for the New American Century
