= Michael Fakhri =

United Nations Special Rapporteur on the Right to Food

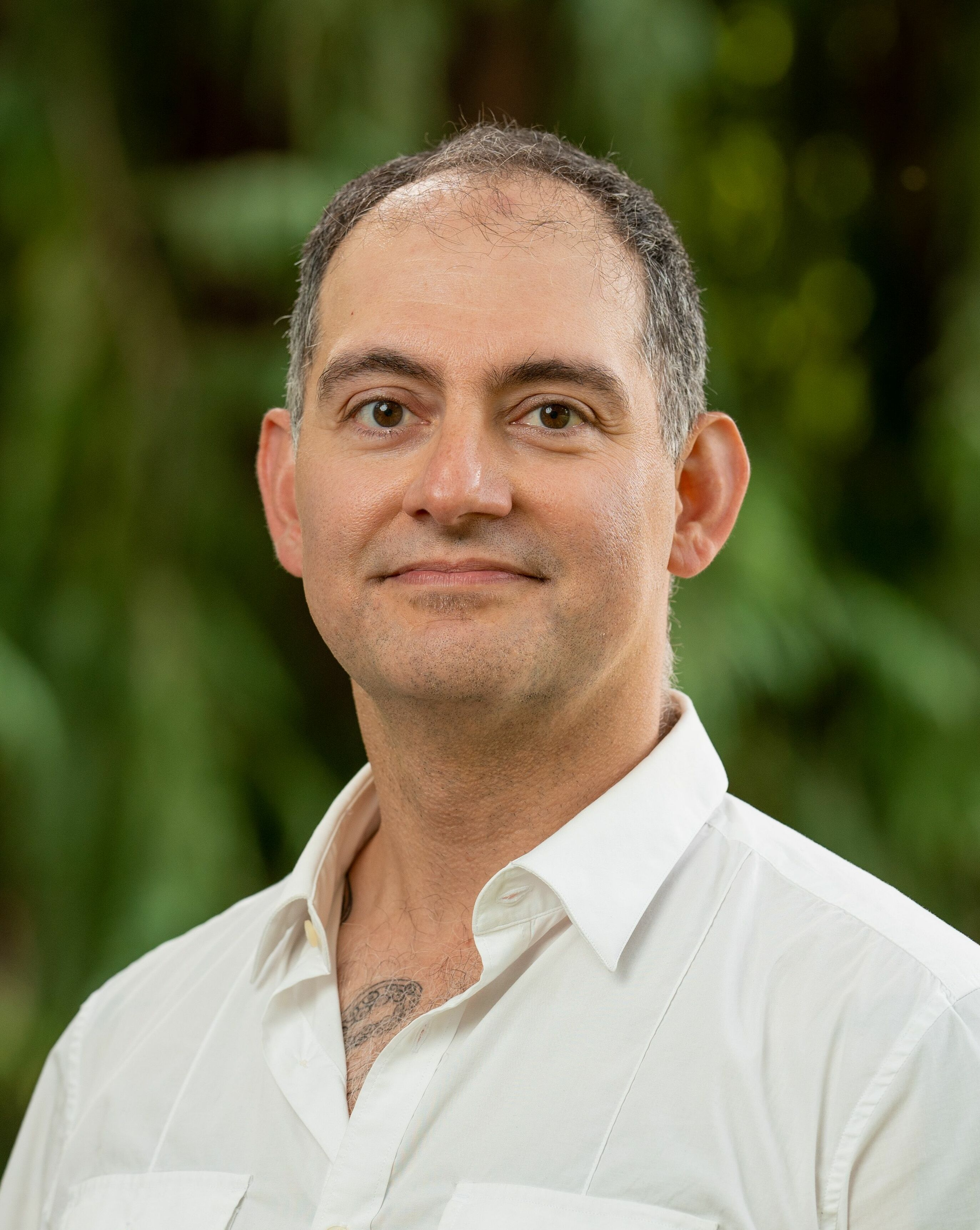

United Nations Special Rapporteur on the Right to Food
- Incumbent
- Assumed office May 1, 2020

Personal details
- Education: University of Western Ontario (BSc); Queen's University at Kingston (LLB); Harvard University (LLM); University of Toronto (SJD)

Michael Fakhri (Canada, 1977) is a Lebanese-Canadian lawyer who specializes in human rights, food law and economic law. He was the United Nations Special Rapporteur on the Right to Food from May 2020 to April 2026. He is currently a professor of law at the University of Oregon and director of the Food Sovereignty Project.

Fakhri was appointed as Special Rapporteur by the UN on May 1, 2020. The key responsibility is to study and make recommendations on “the right to food" and the adoption of efforts to ensure that all have sufficient food.

== Biography ==
Fakhri comes from a Lebanese family that immigrated to Canada. He initially studied biology at the University of Western Ontario where, in 1998, he obtained a Bachelor of Science in Ecology, then studied law. He obtained a Bachelor of Laws from Queen's University at Kingston, Ontario, and was admitted to the Ontario Bar in 2002. From 2005 to 2006, he completed a master's degree from Harvard Law School, and in 2011, he completed his studies by obtaining a Doctor of Juridical Sciences from the University of Toronto.
