= Farid Hafez =

Austrian political scientist

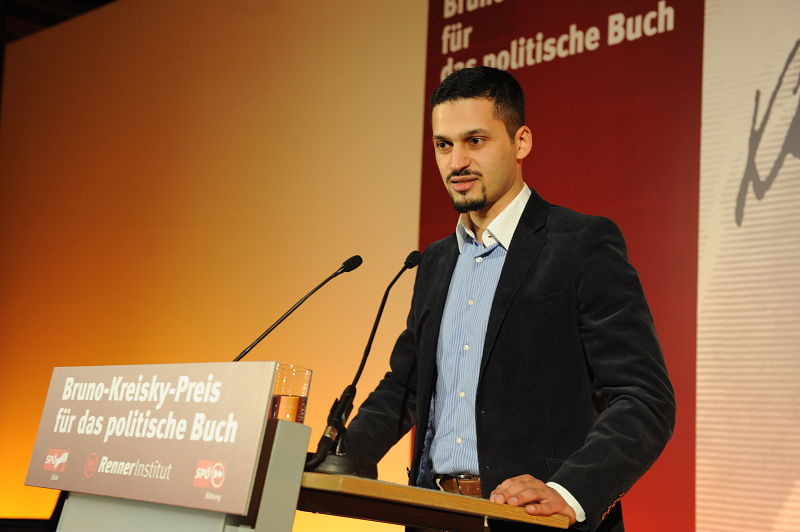
- Farid Hafez at the Bruno-Kreisky-Anerkennungspreis 2010
- Born: December 23, 1981 (age 44); Ried im Innkreis, Austria
- Occupation: Political scientist
- Known for: Research on Islamophobia

Farid Hafez (born 23 December 1981) is an Austrian political scientist and teaches International Relations at William and Mary. He was previously the Class of 1955 Distinguished Visiting Professor of International Studies at Williams College. Since 2017, he has also been a senior researcher at Georgetown University's The Bridge Initiative.

== Early life and education ==
Hafez was born in Ried im Innkreis, Austria on 23 December 1981. After moving to Austria's capital, Vienna, and taking his first degree in political science, he finished his studies and earned his PhD at the University of Vienna in 2009. He earned his Habilitation at the University of Salzburg in 2019.

== Academic career ==
Shortly before submitting his dissertation, in which he analyzed parliamentary debates on the ban of mosques and minarets in two Austrian counties, Hafez and Middle East scholar John Bunzl co-edited the collection Islamophobie in Österreich, published by StudienVerlag in 2009.

Since then, Hafez published widely on Islamophobia. In 2010, he founded the Islamophobia Studies Yearbook In 2015, he created the European Islamophobia Report, which he now edits along with political scientist Enes Bayrakli for the Leopold Weiss Institute, LWI, based in Vienna, Austria. Hafez has also published on Islam and the Far-Right for Brookings Institution.

He is a faculty affiliate of the Rutgers University's Center for Security, Rights and Race and a member of the affiliated faculty of the Islamophobia Research and Documentation Project at University of California, Berkeley. He is also an affiliated faculty and scholars-member of the Center for Right-Wing Studies at the University of California, Berkeley and the editor of numerous works on Islamophobia.

From 2008 to 2010, Hafez did research at the department of law of religion and culture at the University of Vienna, before he started teaching at the Muslim Teachers Training College in Vienna (2009 to 2014). In 2014, he was visiting scholar at Columbia University.

During the academic year 2016/17, he was Fulbright-Botstiber Visiting Professor of Austrian-American Studies at UC Berkeley. Hafez had taught at the department of Oriental studies at the University of Vienna as well as at the University of Klagenfurt.

His research at the department of political science and sociology at the University of Salzburg focused on Muslim youth movements in Europe.

He also teaches at a number of academic non-universitarian institutions such as the Global Citizenship Alliance. In 2015, he was part of the faculty of The Ariane de Rothschild Fellowship.

From 2021 to 2024, he has been visiting professor of international studies at Williams College. In 2022, he became teaching fellow in human rights at St. Francis College in New York City. Since 2024, he has been teaching at William and Mary.

== Awards ==
In 2020, Hafez was awarded the "Islam on the Edges"-price by Shenandoah University's Center for Islam in the Contemporary World (CICW).

In 2009, Hafez was awarded was awarded the Bruno Kreisky award (Anerkennungspreis) of the Karl-Renner-Institute for the political book of the year 2009 for his book ‘Islamophobia in Austria’.

The Austrian Culture Magazine named Hafez as one of 100 „Austrians with a special future“.

== Public appearances ==
Hafez publishes regularly in Austrian and international news media like The Guardian Haaretz, Middle East Eye, Al-Jazeera English, Der Standard and Die Presse. He is a frequent interview partner for international media, among them BBC, The Washington Post and Democracy Now

== Main positions ==
Hafez identifies with what he calls the "racism studies-informed postcolonial approach" in studying Islamophobia.

"Many of the measures taken to regulate Islam-state relations reveal an approach that on one side attempts to give Islam a place in their society, while on the other side clearly refers to a stereotypical imagination of the Muslim, where the notion of Europe stands for enlightenment, modernity and progressiveness, while Islam and Muslims represent the opposite. Hence, we can observe a notion of ‘civilizing’ Islam that goes back to colonial times and introduces a division between the good and the bad Muslim; the former who submits to the state and its rules, versus the latter, who remains the uncivilized, barbaric, alien Muslim, prone to extremisms and fanaticism and incapable of fitting into modernity. The Islam dispositives revealed here show that the states legitimize their interference based on this implicitly reproduced imagination of the bad Muslims, and thus endeavor to ‘civilize’ Muslims subjects, reminding us again of the “white man's burden.”"

Hafez's most quoted article is 'Shifting borders: Islamophobia as common ground for building pan-European right-wing unity,' which appeared in the peer-reviewed journal Patterns of Prejudice. In this article, Hafez argues that "Islamophobia has become a useful tool for right-wing parties to mobilize electors in many European nation-states" and that concomitantly there happened a shift by formerly antisemitic far-right parties "to gain wider acceptance in mainstream societies by distancing themselves from a former antisemitic profile."

Hafez's concept of 'Islamophobic Populism' has gained some attraction in the research of contemporary far-right political parties in Europe. He developed the concept of 'Islamophobic Populism' by synthesizing the concepts of populism, Islamophobia with the help of critical discourse analysis.

== European Islamophobia Report ==
The flagship publication, co-edited by Hafez and authored by a collective of more than 40 authors. from across Europe is the annual European Islamophobia Report. Authors include Prof. of English literature Olivier Esteves from France, sociologist James Carr from Ireland, political scientist Ineke van der Valk from the Netherlands, anthropologist Sindre Bangstad and Holocaust-studies Professor Cora Alexa Døvingfrom Norway, Polish social scientist Konrad Pędziwiatr, historian Hikmet Karčić from Bosnia, sociologist Aleksandra Lewicki from Germany, Italian sociologist Alfredo Alietti, social scientist Ana Frank from Ljubljana, religious studies Professor Mattias Gardell from Sweden, and historian Aristotle Kallis from Greece.

Since 2021, the report is published by Leopold Weiss Institute together with several US American institutions such as UC Berkeley's Othering & Belonging Institute headed by John A. Powell, Rutgers University's Center for Security, Race and Rights.

Its 2015 edition was presented by MEP Josef Weidenholzer and MEP Afzal Khan, who belong both to the Progressive Alliance of Socialists and Democrats. The 2017 edition was presented by Wajid Khan. Its 2018 edition was presented by the British member of the European Parliament for the British Green Party, the Rt. Honorable Magid Magid. In 2023, the social democratic MEP Joao Albuquerque (Portugal) supported the discussion of the report by the Brussels-based European Network on Religion & Belief (ENORB). The report has been presented at different venues and international organizations such as the OSCE, and the Council of Europe.

12 signatories from the academia and civil society, who were all criticized in the report, wrote a public letter of protest to EU-Commission President Ursula von der Leyen, calling on her not to co-finance anymore the report. Signatories included Saïda Keller-Messahli Ahmad Mansour or Seyran Ateş. The signatories received an answer from Commissioner Johannes Hahn, who argued that "transparency and equal treatment were respected in the selection process".

== Operation Luxor ==
On 9 November 2020, the Austrian police raid called Operation Luxor was directed against people who were alleged terrorists. Der Standard editor Hans Rauscher called the operation a "gigantic flop", and Die Presse editor Anna Thalhammer saw the investigation "crumbling" almost two years later following a decision by the Appellate Court that called the raid "unlawful." Hafez was among those who were suspected and his home was raided, but was acquitted from all charges in January 2023. In April of 2024, Hafez sued the deradicalization expert Lorenzo Vidino for his involvement with the private detective firm Alp Services in a European-wide large-scale smearing campaign that The New Yorker had revealed.

The Regional Court (that had allowed the initial unlawful raid) issued a decision that upheld the investigation against Prof. Hafez, citing his academic work. According to the Regional Court (Landesgericht Graz), Hafez's “activities in the preparation of the so-called Islamophobia Report and his activity with the Bridge Initiative at Georgetown University is intended to disseminate the fighting term “Islamophobia” with the goal of preventing any critical engagement with Islam as a religion [...] in order to establish an Islamic state [...]." According to Georgetown University, "this statement and the court’s decision are proof that the case against Prof. Farid Hafez is a dangerous sign of an attempt to silence the free speech and academic freedom of a prominent scholar." Media scholar Prof. Fritz Hausjell called this an "encroachment on academic freedom and freedom of speech."

In an "International Statement Opposing Use of Counter-Terrorism Powers to Target Islamophobia Expert," which was signed by more than 350 scholars, primarily from the United States of America, including Charles Taylor, Talal Asad and Peter Rose. The letter argued that this raid was "part of the international rise of authoritarian governmental suppression of Muslim civil society and critical scholarship in Western democracies". They called upon the State Prosecutor "to close the case, and cease its intimidation of Dr Farid Hafez and others who have been wrongly attacked."

After more than two years, the appellate court decided that the allegations and suspicions were unsubstantial. Farid Hafez published two books on Operation Luxor in German, one being an academic anthology that he edited and the other one a memoir-inspired story that contextualized the Operation Luxor in Austria's general atmosphere of Islamophobia.

Shortly after Operation Luxor, Hafez complained about the police search and compared it to the 1938 Kristallnacht pogrom. This comparison was criticized by Minister of the Interior (Austria) Karl Nehammer and Minister of Integration (Austria) Susanne Raab. The former called the comparison with Kristallnacht and the police search against activists of political Islam "tasteless", "scandalous" and "an expression of an anti-democratic position".

== Citations and global library presence ==
As of March 2025, Google Scholar citations lists 2081 citations of the works of Hafez; the H-Index is 20. OCLC WorldCat Identities currently lists 58 works of the author in 138 publications in 2 languages and 1,214 library holdings. 33 of his essays are included in Scopus.

== Books ==
Hafez has authored, co-authored or edited over 140 publications, including articles in high-ranking academic journals.

As single author:

- Feindbild Islam. Zur Salonfähigkeit von Rassismus, Wien: Böhlau Verlag & V&R unipress. (Islamophobia. On Mainstreaming Racism)
- Mein Name ist Malcolm X: Das Leben eines Revolutionärs. (My Name is Malcolm X: The Life of a Revolutionary)
- Islamophober Populismus: Moschee- und Minarettbauverbote österreichischer Parlamentsparteien (Islamophobic Populism. Debates on the Ban of Mosques and Minarets)
- Anas Schakfeh: Das österreichische Gesicht des Islams (Anas Schakfeh: The Austrian Face of Islam)
- Islamisch-politische Denker: Eine Einführung in die islamisch-politische Ideengeschichte (Islamic-Political Thinkers: An introduction to Islamic-Political Thought)
- Jung, muslimisch, österreichisch. (Young, Muslim, Austrian)

As co-author:

- Politicizing Islam in Austria. The Far-Right Impact in the Twenty-First Century (together with Reinhard Heinisch)

As (co-)editor:

- Operation Luxor. Eine kritische Aufarbeitung der größten rassistischen Polizeioperation Österreichs. (Operation Luxor. A Critical Analysis of Austria's largest racist police operation)
- The rise of global Islamophobia in the War on Terror. Coloniality, race, and Islam (together with Naved Bakali)
- Islamophobia in Muslim Majority Societies (together with Enes Bayrakli)
- Islamophobie in Österreich (, Islamophobia in Austria, together with John Bunzl)
- since 2010: Islamophobia Studies Yearbook
- From the Far Right to the Mainstream: Islamophobia in Party Politics and the Media (together with Humayun Ansari)
- since 2016 European Islamophobia Report (together with Enes Bayraklı)
