= Saïda Keller-Messahli =

Saïda Keller-Messahli, born July 25, 1957, in Aouina near Bizerte in northern Tunisia, is a Swiss-Tunisian freelance journalist, writer and human rights activist. She is the founder and president of the Forum for a Progressive Islam and received the 2016 Swiss Prize for Human Rights.

== Biography ==
Saïda Keller-Messahli was born in 1957 in northern Tunisia. She is the fifth of eight children of a family of Berber origin working in agriculture. The Swiss association Terre des hommes placed her with a host family from 1964 to 1970 in Grindelwald (Bern) where she educated in the village school. Because her family was too poor to raise her, Saïda Keller-Messahli returned to Tunisia at the age of 13 following the divorce of the welcoming couple. She continued her studies and obtained her baccalaureate in Tunisia.

== Political battles ==
In 2004, Saïda Keller-Messahli founded the Forum for a Progressive Islam (of which she is still president), inspired by the book „The Illness of Islam“ by Abdelwahab Meddeb. She advocated the creation of a register and an authorization system for imams and a limitation of the number of mosques to 300 in Switzerland.
