= United Nations Special Rapporteur on the Right to Food =

United Nations Special Rapporteur

- Emblem of the United Nations
- Incumbent; Michael Fakhri since 2020
- Inaugural holder: Jean Ziegler
- Website: www.ohchr.org/en/special-procedures/sr-food

The Special Rapporteur on the Right to Food is a Special Rapporteur appointed by the United Nations, who reports on the right to food. The mandate was established in 2000 by the former Commission on Human Rights which appointed the first Rapporteur, Jean Ziegler. In 2008 the second Rapporteur, Olivier De Schutter, was appointed by the United Nations Human Rights Council, the successor to the Commission. In 2014 the third Rapporteur, Hilal Elver was appointed. In 2020, the current Rapporteur, Michael Fakhri, was appointed.

== Mandate ==
The Rapporteur is expected to report both to the Human Rights Council and to the UN General Assembly (Third Committee) on the fulfillment of the mandate, as follows:

* To promote the full realization of the right to food and the adoption of measures at the national, regional and international levels for the realization of the right of everyone to adequate food, [...]

- To examine ways and means of overcoming existing and emerging obstacles to the realization of the right to food;
- To continue mainstreaming a gender perspective and taking into account an age dimension in the fulfilment of the mandate, considering that women and children are disproportionately affected by hunger, food insecurity, and poverty;
- To present recommendations on steps toward achieving the full realization of the right to food, [...]
- To work in close cooperation with all States, intergovernmental and non-governmental organizations, the Committee on Economic, Social, and Cultural Rights, as well as with other relevant actors, [...]
- To continue participating in and contributing to relevant international conferences with the aim of promoting the realization of the right to food.

== Country visits ==
The first Rapporteur engaged in 12 country missions between 2002 and 2007. The second Rapporteur engaged in 10 country missions between 2010 and 2012.

== See also ==
- Special rapporteur
- United Nations special rapporteur
- Plant Treaty / UPOV Convention
- Declaration on the Rights of Peasants
