= Jonathan Schanzer =

American author

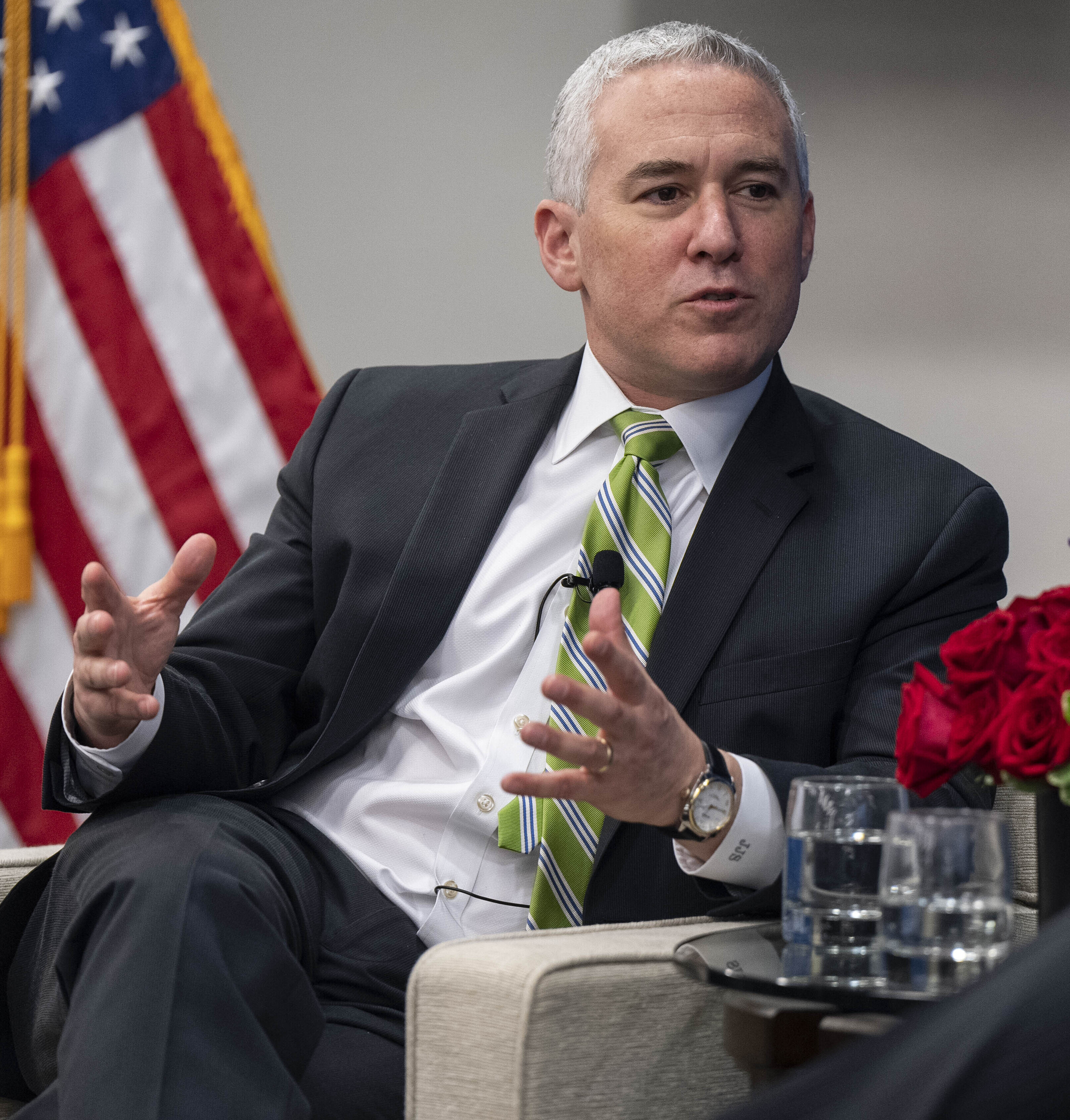
- Schanzer in 2023
- Occupations: Author, executive director at Foundation for Defense of Democracies and former U.S. Treasury terrorism finance analyst
- Website: schanzer.pundicity.com

Jonathan Schanzer is an American author, executive director at the Foundation for Defense of Democracies (FDD) and former U.S. Treasury terrorism finance analyst. At the FDD he oversees the work of the organization's experts and scholars and hosts the FDD Morning Brief podcast. Schanzer is the author of several books on the Middle East and has testified before U.S. Congress.

== Early life and education ==
Schanzer graduated from Emory University with a bachelor's degree and from Hebrew University of Jerusalem with a master's in Middle Eastern history. In 2001, he studied Arabic at the American University in Cairo. He received his doctorate from King's College London, and wrote his dissertation on anti-terrorism efforts of the US Congress. He speaks English, Hebrew and Arabic.

== Career ==
After graduating, Schanzer returned to the U.S. and worked at the Middle East Forum in Philadelphia and The Washington Institute for Near East Policy. He then worked at the U.S. Treasury Department as a counterterrorist analyst, helping to track and freeze funding of Al-Qaeda and Hamas.

In 2007, Schanzer was appointed Director of Policy of the Jewish Policy Center (JPC), a think tank tied to the Republican Jewish Coalition. He was also editor of inFOCUS Quarterly, a JPC journal.

Schanzer is the executive director at the Foundation for Defense of Democracies. He joined the FDD in February 2010 and is a member of its Center on Economic and Financial Power.

== Media appearances ==
Schanzer has provided commentary on Middle Eastern affairs for broadcast and online media outlets. In a 2023 episode of PBS's Firing Line with Margaret Hoover, he discussed the Gaza war, hostage negotiations, and Iran's role in the region. In interviews with RealClearPolitics in 2021 and 2023, Schanzer discussed the Gaza conflict, Hamas, Israel, Iran, and humanitarian conditions in Gaza. In a 2021 C-SPAN interview, he spoke about the Gaza conflict and U.S. counterterrorism policy. Schanzer has also appeared on independent platforms such as SmartHER News and The One Way Ticket Show. Additionally, Schanzer hosts the FDD Morning Brief Podcast, in which he discusses Middle Eastern topics with relevant experts.

== Publications ==
- Hamas vs. Fatah: The Struggle for Palestine, Palgrave Macmillan (November 11, 2008) ISBN 0-230-60905-8.
- Al-Qaeda's Armies: Middle East Affiliate Groups & The Next Generation of Terror, Washington Institute for Near East Policy (October 1, 2004) ISBN 1-56171-884-X.
- State of Failure: Yasser Arafat, Mahmoud Abbas and the Unmaking of the Palestinian State, (October 29, 2013) ISBN 978-1137278241
- Gaza Conflict 2021: Hamas, Israel and Eleven Days of War, Foundation for Defense of Democracies Press (November 10, 2021) ISBN 978-1956450019.
