= John Blandford Jr. =

UN official (1897–1972)

John Blandford

Director of the United Nations Relief and Works Agency for Palestine Refugees in the Near East
- In office July 1951 – March 20, 1953
- Secretary General: Trygve Lie
- Preceded by: Howard Kennedy
- Succeeded by: Henry Labouisse

Administrator of the National Housing Agency
- In office February 16, 1942 – January 26, 1946
- President: Franklin D. Roosevelt; Harry S. Truman
- Preceded by: Nathan Straus Jr. (United States Housing Authority)
- Succeeded by: Wilson W. Wyatt

Personal details
- Born: John Bennett Blandford Jr. August 19, 1897 New York City, New York, U.S.
- Died: January 21, 1972 (aged 74) New York City, New York, U.S.
- Education: Stevens Institute of Technology (BS)

John Bennett Blandford Jr. (August 19, 1897 – January 21, 1972) was the United Nations Relief and Works Agency for Palestine Refugees in the Near East's second Director from 1951 to 1953. Blandford served as chairman of the UNRWA Advisory Commission before becoming director of UNRWA. He had been deputy chief of U.S. Economic Cooperation Administration in Greece and a consultant to president Harry Truman on the Marshall Plan.

== See also ==
- List of Directors and Commissioners-General of the United Nations Relief and Works Agency for Palestine Refugees in the Near East

Political offices
Preceded by Nathan Straus Jr. as Director of the United States Housing Authority	Administrator of the National Housing Agency; 1942–1946	Succeeded by Wilson W. Wyatt
Diplomatic posts
Preceded by Howard Kennedy	Director of the United Nations Relief and Works Agency for Palestine Refugees in the Near East; 1951–1953	Succeeded by Henry Labouisse
