= Howard Kennedy (Canadian Army officer) =

Canadian Army officer

Howard Kennedy (31 May 1892 – 1967) was a Canadian Army officer and the first Director of the United Nations Relief and Works Agency for Palestine Refugees in the Near East (UNRWA) from 1950 to 1951.

Born in Dunrobin, Ontario, Kennedy served overseas in the First World War. He was a leading engineer in Ottawa before World War II. Joining the Canadian Army in 1939, he rose to be Quartermaster-General in 1943–44. He was awarded the OBE in January 1944.

After returning from Palestine he chaired the Board of Enquiry into the Reserve Army of Canada which produced the Kennedy Report on the Reserve Army.

== See also ==
- List of Directors and Commissioners-General of the United Nations Relief and Works Agency for Palestine Refugees in the Near East

Positions in intergovernmental organisations
New office	Director for United Nations Relief and Works Agency for Palestine Refugees in the Near East; May 1950–June 1951	Succeeded by John Blandford Jr. ( (United States) )
