= John H. Davis (diplomat) =

John Herbert Davis (October 5, 1904 – February 28, 1988) was an American academic and diplomat, best known in his early career for his work in agribusiness (a term he helped coin), and in his later career for heading the United Nations Relief and Works Agency for Palestine Refugees in the Near East (UNRWA).

== Academic and business career ==
Davis attended the Iowa State University of Science and Technology, where he earned a bachelor's degree, and the University of Minnesota, where he earned Masters and Ph.D. degrees in agricultural economics. He then taught in various positions in the Iowa schools from 1928 to 1939, with a break in 1935–36 during which he worked for the U.S. Department of Agriculture.

From 1939 he became involved in agriculture-related New Deal agencies, working for the Commodity Credit Corporation, National Council of Farmer Cooperatives, and National Wool Marketing Corporation, among other agencies. From 1953 to 1954, he served as Assistant Secretary of Agriculture in the Eisenhower administration. From 1954 to 1959 he was professor at Harvard Business School. There he wrote two influential books on the agricultural sector, in which the term "agribusiness" was coined: A Concept of Agribusiness (1957, with Ray A. Goldberg) and Farmer in a Business Suit (1957).

== Diplomatic career ==
Davis left Harvard in 1959 to serve as the fourth Director and first Commissioner-General of the United Nations Relief and Works Agency for Palestine Refugees in the Near East from 1959 to 1963.

In later years he continued to pursue activities related to the Israeli–Palestinian conflict. He wrote a book outlining his views on prospects for peace (The Evasive Peace, 1970), and founded and served as President of American Near East Refugee Aid.

== See also ==
- List of United Nations Relief and Works Agency for Palestine Refugees in the Near East employees

Positions in intergovernmental organisations
Preceded by Henry Labouisse ( (United States) )	Commissioner-General for United Nations Relief and Works Agency for Palestine Refugees in the Near East; February 1959–December 1963	Succeeded by Laurence Michelmore ( (United States) )
