= Henry Richardson Labouisse Jr. =

American diplomat (1904–1987)

Henry Labouisse

Executive Director of the United Nations International Children's Emergency Fund
- In office June 1965 – January 1980
- Secretary General: U Thant; Kurt Waldheim
- Preceded by: Maurice Pate
- Succeeded by: Jim Grant

United States Ambassador to Greece
- In office March 7, 1962 – May 8, 1965
- President: John Kennedy; Lyndon Johnson
- Preceded by: Ellis O. Briggs
- Succeeded by: Phillips Talbot

Director of the International Cooperation Administration
- In office February 22, 1961 – September 4, 1961
- President: John F. Kennedy
- Preceded by: James Riddleberger
- Succeeded by: Fowler Hamilton (Administrator of the Agency for International Development)

Director of the United Nations Relief and Works Agency for Palestine Refugees in the Near East
- In office June 1954 – June 1958
- Secretary General: Dag Hammarskjöld
- Preceded by: John Blandford Jr.
- Succeeded by: John Davis

Personal details
- Born: Henry Richardson Labouisse Jr. February 11, 1904 New Orleans, Louisiana, U.S.
- Died: March 25, 1987 (aged 83) New York City, New York, U.S.
- Resting place: Metairie Cemetery
- Party: Democratic
- Spouses: Elizabeth Scriven Clark (m. 1935; died 1945); Ève Curie (m. 1954)
- Children: 1
- Education: Princeton University (BA); Harvard University (LLB)

Henry Richardson Labouisse Jr. (February 11, 1904 – March 25, 1987) was an American diplomat and statesman. He was the third Director of the United Nations Relief and Works Agency for Palestine Refugees in the Near East (UNRWA) from 1954 to 1958. He was the director of the United Nations Children's Fund for years (1965–1979). He was also a member of the Council on Foreign Relations. A lawyer, he was United States Ambassador to France 1952–1954, as well as United States Ambassador to Greece 1962–1965. Labouisse had been the principal United States Department of State official dealing with the implementation of the Marshall Plan.

He was born to Henry Richardson Labouisse Sr. and Frances Devereux (Huger) Labouisse, a granddaughter of Leonidas Polk, in New Orleans, Louisiana. He married Elizabeth Scriven Clark on June 29, 1935. He married Ève Curie in 1954, nine years after Elizabeth died. The marriage with Ève made him the son-in-law of Marie and Pierre Curie. In 1965, he accepted on behalf of UNICEF the Nobel Peace Prize and became one of the five Nobel Prize winners of the Curie family.

There is a prize in his honor established at Princeton University, his alma mater, which is given to a graduating senior each year.

== Personal life and education ==
Henry Richardson Labouisse was born in New Orleans, Louisiana, on February 11, 1904. He was the youngest of three sons of Henry Richardson Labouisse and Frances D. (Huger) Labouisse. Through his father, Henry Jr. was a great-great-great-grandson of English-American scientist Joseph Priestley. He married Elizabeth Scriven Clark (the daughter of art collector and philanthropist Stephen Carlton Clark) on June 29, 1935; they had one daughter, Anne (Farnsworth), who married publisher Marty Peretz. Elizabeth Clark Labouisse died in 1945.

Labouisse remarried on November 19, 1954, to Ève Curie, daughter of scientists Pierre and Marie Curie. Curie was a renowned author and journalist. They met in 1951, while he was on the Economic Cooperation Administration (ECA) staff and she was a secretary with the North Atlantic Treaty Organization (NATO).

Labouisse earned his B.A. from Princeton University in 1926 and graduated from Harvard University Law School in 1929. He was admitted into the New York State bar the following year. Labouisse was an associate and member of the New York City law firm Taylor, Blanc, Capron and Marsh, and its successor firm Mitchell, Taylor, Capron & Marsh, from 1929 to 1941.

== Second World War ==
When the United States entered the Second World War, Labouisse chose to serve his country by accepting a position in the State Department. He began there in 1941 and rose through a variety of positions over the next several years, most concerned with forming and implementing foreign economic policy. His first position was as assistant chief of the Division of Defense Materials in December 1941. He was promoted to chief of the division in February 1943. Later in 1943, he was made deputy director of the Office of Foreign Economic Coordination, and in January 1944 he was appointed chief of the Eastern Hemisphere Division. In March 1944, he was transferred to the Office of European Affairs, where he was special assistant to the director.

Labouisse was appointed chief of the Foreign Economic Administration mission to France in November 1944 and served concurrently as minister for economic affairs at the American Embassy. He became special assistant to Under Secretary of State, William L. Clayton, in November 1945. Through his work with the undersecretary, and his previous work coordinating aid to various European reconstruction points, Labouisse played an important role in the aid efforts that culminated in the Marshall Plan. In July 1946, he returned to his role as special assistant to the director of the Office of European Affairs.

Labouisse then served as the principal State Department officer working with the Economic Cooperation Administration (ECA) during the initial implementation of the Marshall Plan. He traveled to Paris in March 1948 as head of the mission to establish the ECA as the agency to administer United States economic aid to Europe. He returned to Europe in May 1948 as the head of the United States delegation to the Geneva meeting of the Economic Commission for Europe. Labouisse then served as coordinator of foreign aid and assistance in the State Department from June 1948 until October 1949, when he became director of British Commonwealth and Northern European Affairs. He held this post until September 1951. He began arguing for a tougher stance on aid in 1949, one that would force European economies to adjust to market forces. In September 1951, Labouisse was named head of the ECA's mission to France, journeying to Paris as head of the Marshall Plan mission. When the ECA was replaced by the Mutual Security Administration and the Foreign Operations Administration, Labouisse headed the Paris missions of both agencies from 1951 to June 1954.

== Appointment as director of UNRWA and IBRD ==
Labouisse left United States government service in 1954 to work for the United Nations. He was appointed director of the United Nations Relief and Work Agency for Palestine Refugees (UNRWA) in June 1954 at the request of United Nations Secretary-General Dag Hammarskjöld. The UNRWA was established in December 1949 to carry out relief and works projects in cooperation with local governments. When Labouisse assumed his directorship, the UNRWA was responsible for the care of 887,000 Arab refugees who had fled Palestine in 1948. Labouisse oversaw the improvement of the standard of living in the refugee camps, raised the standards of health, education, and vocational training, and established a grant program that allowed refugees to make a down payment on a farm or shop. He left the UNRWA in 1958.

Labouisse was appointed as a consultant to the International Bank of Reconstruction and Development in May 1959. He headed a survey mission to Venezuela in September 1959 to assist in the formulation of a program of economic development. He was recalled from that mission by Hammarskjöld to serve as special advisor to the secretary-general during the Congo Crisis in 1960. In December 1960, Labouisse was appointed as the International Bank's special representative for Africa and also headed a mission to Uganda to study economic problems.

== Appointment as the director of the ICA ==
He returned to United States government service in January 1961, when he was appointed Director of the International Cooperation Administration (ICA) by President John F. Kennedy, which was created to coordinate nonmilitary foreign aid programs. Labouisse had been considered for the post by President Dwight D. Eisenhower in February 1959, but his appointment was rejected by Republican national chairman Meade Alcorn on the grounds that Labouisse had registered as a Democrat several years earlier. In May 1961, President Kennedy began to work with the United States Congress to reorganize the foreign aid programs into a single agency. The ICA was eliminated during the reorganization, and Labouisse was named United States Ambassador to Greece. He held that post from 1962 to 1965.

Labouisse was appointed the second executive director of the United Nations Children's Fund (UNICEF) in June 1965, following the death of the first director, Maurice Pate. During his directorship, Labouisse oversaw the emergency relief efforts for several major conflicts and naturals disasters, and fought to alleviate poor conditions in developing countries. UNICEF provided relief to both sides in the Nigerian civil war in 1968 and to Cambodia in 1979, after the country was invaded by Vietnam.

== Retirement ==
Labouisse retired from his position with UNICEF in December 1979, although he continued to work as a consultant on the Cambodia and Thailand operations for most of 1980. After his retirement, Labouisse continued to be active in various organizations, including serving as chairman of the Board of the American Farm School in Thessaloniki, Greece, from 1980 to 1985 and as trustee of the school from 1965 to 1985. Labouisse died on March 25, 1987, at the age of 83.

== See also ==
External images
- Labouisse receiving the Nobel Peace Prize on behalf of UNICEF
- State Department employee Labouisse working at his desk, Life Magazine

- List of Directors and Commissioners-General of the United Nations Relief and Works Agency for Palestine Refugees in the Near East

Diplomatic posts
Preceded by James Riddleberger	Director of the International Cooperation Administration; 1961	Succeeded by Fowler Hamilton as Administrator of the Agency for International Development
Preceded by Ellis O. Briggs	United States Ambassador to Greece; 1962–1965	Succeeded by Phillips Talbot
Preceded by John Blandford Jr.	Director of the United Nations Relief and Works Agency for Palestine Refugees in the Near East; 1954–1958	Succeeded by John Davis
Preceded by Maurice Pate	Executive Director of the United Nations International Children's Emergency Fund; 1965–1980	Succeeded by Jim Grant
