= Hamas–UNRWA Holocaust dispute =

2009 dispute over Holocaust education

The Hamas–UNRWA Holocaust dispute erupted on 31 August 2009 following a perception in the Gaza Strip that the United Nations Relief and Works Agency (UNRWA) planned to include a course on human rights that speaks about the Holocaust in the eighth-grade curriculum of preparatory schools it runs in the territory. The Palestinian nationalist and Islamist movement Hamas, which is the de-facto government in the Israeli-occupied Gaza Strip, protested, calling the Holocaust "a lie made up by the Zionists" and demanding the removal of the offending content from the curriculum. Some officials of the United Nations agency initially responded by denying that it teaches the subject of the Holocaust in its schools or that it plans to teach it in its new curriculum. This denial drew criticism from various groups and individuals.

== Background ==
UNRWA runs 221 of more than 600 primary and secondary schools in the Gaza Strip, educating some 200,000 children between the ages of 6 and 15. The Gaza Strip has been ruled by Hamas since it seized control of the enclave in June 2007 by defeating Palestinian President Mahmoud Abbas' security forces. According to the Associated Press, "Hamas has been trying to cement control over Gaza, while the U.N. agency is increasingly emerging as a shadow government, providing services to some 1 million of Gaza's 1.4 million people".

The Holocaust is not taught in U.N.-run schools for Palestinian refugees in the West Bank, Syria, Jordan and Lebanon, nor is it taught in Palestinian government schools in the West Bank or Gaza.

== Hamas protest ==
Protesting what it said were plans to teach eighth-graders in U.N. schools about the Holocaust, the Hamas-affiliated Popular Committee of Palestinian refugees sent an open letter to the chief of UNRWA offices calling the Holocaust "a lie made up by the Zionists" and demanding it "immediately" erase the part that speaks about the Holocaust from the Palestinian pupils' curriculum. Husam Ahmed, the Popular Committee's coordinator in the Gaza Strip, said the material, which was to be included in a course on human rights, "was formed in a way that shows sympathy with the Jews".

The interior ministry of the Hamas de facto government in Gaza expressed astonishment over the UNRWA curriculum's acknowledgement of the Holocaust. "We reject teaching our pupils such thoughts that contradicts with our Palestinian beliefs," said the interior ministry statement, which called on the ministry of education "to check if such news is right."

The head of Hamas' education committee in Gaza, Abdul Rahman el-Jamal, said that the Holocaust was a "big lie". Meanwhile, Hamas Education Minister Muhammad Askol criticized UNRWA, saying it was not respecting Hamas's "sovereignty" over Gaza. He said he planned to ask for a meeting with agency officials to "assure the necessary coordination".

Hamas spiritual leader Yunis al-Astal said teaching children about the Nazi genocide of Jews would be "marketing a lie", and characterized the possible introduction of the subject into Gaza schools as a "war crime".

Hamas spokesman Sami Abu Zuhri said that Hamas rejects any attempt to introduce the Holocaust into the curriculum as "a kind of normalization with Israel and an attempt to bridge the psychological gap between Israel and the Palestinians".

Jamila al-Shanti, a Hamas legislative official, said: "Talk about the Holocaust and the execution of the Jews contradicts and is against our culture, our principles, our traditions, values, heritage and religion".

Mustafa al-Sawwaf, editor of the Hamas-run newspaper Filastin, said the U.N. "should also be prevented from implementing this destructive policy that harms our history and civilization as well as our people's culture."

== UNRWA response ==
UNRWA denied that it teaches the Holocaust in preparatory schools or that the Holocaust is included in the pupils' curriculum. Adnan Abu Hasna, UNRWA spokesman in Gaza, said: "Such reports are totally untrue. The current curriculum that is taught to pupils at UNRWA schools doesn't contain any indication to the subject of the Holocaust".

Similarly, according to the Ma'an News Agency, UNRWA Commissioner-General Karen Abu Zayd said at a press conference on 1 September, "I can refute allegations that UN school curriculum includes anything about the Holocaust. Anyone can have a look at the school books. Really we focus on human rights in [the] curriculum." The accuracy of this report was later contested by UNRWA.

The agency also denied that it was planning to include the subject in its new curriculum. Mahmoud al-Hemdeyat, director of education department of UNRWA in the Gaza Strip, said: "UNRWA hasn't finished yet from finalizing the new curriculum... As far as I know, the curriculum doesn't include anything about the Holocaust".

According to the Associated Press (AP), Karen Abu Zayd suggested information about the Holocaust could be included in later years, but the curriculum being developed was still in draft stage. AP also wrote that UNWRA's website mentioned general plans to include the Holocaust in lessons on the "historical context" that gave rise to the 1948 Universal Declaration of Human Rights.

UNRWA chief in Gaza John Ging said he believed the dispute over the syllabus had more to do with attempts by Hamas to meddle in the U.N. organization's affairs than with the Holocaust. Ging added that he felt any human rights course is incomplete without discussing the Holocaust, but it would exceed UNWRA's mandate to write texts about the Holocaust and the Palestinian uprooting. According to one UN source, the lessons had been under consideration for the 2009-10 human rights course.

=== Disputed quotes ===
A statement by UNRWA on 4 September denied unspecified quotes which it said the Simon Wiesenthal Center had attributed to Karen Abu Zayd and John Ging. The Center had previously quoted Abu Zayd as saying "we focus on human rights in curriculum" and "the murder of 6 million Jews and 5 million other undesirables ... is not a human-rights issue", and Ging as saying "There is no intention to integrate materials and topics [on the Holocaust] that are inconsistent with the desire of Palestinian society." According to one journalist, Abu Zayd's quotes were "untraceable" and Ging's quote was "based on a computer-generated translation of an Arabic-language report by PalToday, a Gaza Strip-based news agency with Islamist sympathies, quoting a Hamas official who purported to quote Ging".

== Criticism of UNRWA ==
The United Nations agency was criticized by various parties following initial reports that it would not be introducing discussion of the Holocaust in its human rights education.

United States Congresswoman Ileana Ros-Lehtinen (R-Fla.) said in a statement that "by disconnecting the Holocaust from human rights, (the U.N. agency) is highlighting the antisemitic bias that pervades the U.N. system."

The Simon Wiesenthal Center called for the dismissal of Abu Zayd and Ging and demanded the United States and Canada suspend funding for the U.N. agency pending the resolution of the issue. The United States was the second-largest donor to the agency in 2008, providing nearly $96 million of its $541.8 million budget.

The American Jewish Congress said in a statement: "It is... discouraging... that the United Nations Relief and Works Agency did not criticize Hamas for denying the children of Gaza knowledge of one of the central events of the 20th century. Instead, it rushed to deny that the Holocaust was being taught in its schools or that it was contemplating teaching it in the future".

== Other responses ==
Jihad Zakarneh, the deputy education minister in the West Bank, said teaching Palestinian children about the Holocaust has to wait until there is a peace agreement with Israel. "When Israel ends its occupation of our land and our people and gives us our right of independence and self-determination, then we discuss this issue with them".

== Aftermath ==
In October 2009, John Ging told The Independent that he was "confident and determined" that the Holocaust would feature in the curriculum, saying, "no human-rights curriculum is complete without the inclusion of the facts of the Holocaust, and its lessons". At the time, the curriculum was expected to be completed within weeks and then put out for consultation with parents and the public. In November 2010, Ging confirmed in an interview that the Holocaust was being discussed in UNRWA schools in Gaza, noting "we enrich the curriculum with our human rights program, for all ages. We teach the children about the history of the human rights movement. We grounded our program in the universal declaration of human rights, which is borne out of the horrors of the Second World War. So we teach the children the horrors of the war, including the Holocaust. We are also teaching the kids about the unanimously adopted resolution on Holocaust remembrance, which is a 2005 UN resolution proposed by the state of Israel adopted in the General Assembly".

UNRWA efforts brought continued criticism from some Palestinian Islamists. One writer for the pro-Hamas Palestine Information Center warned that "some circles within UNRWA... have been trying to introduce 'the holocaust' [sic] into Palestinian school curricula in the Gaza Strip". He suggested that these efforts indicated "a virulent Zionist propensity to brainwash Palestinians, particularly young generations, into accepting or at least understanding Zionism, a hateful fascist political ideology".

Further controversy erupted when it became known that UNRWA, as part of a project that brought its top human rights students from Gaza to the United States for a visit, had taken them to an exhibit on the Holocaust at UN headquarters in New York. According to a statement issued by the Hamas refugee department, "We denounce this suspicious act in hopes that UNRWA education officials in the Gaza Strip will not repeat it; and we hope the Palestinian Authority will take a national stand to put a stop to ideological corruption on Palestine's youth."

In October 2012, following reports that the UNRWA was planning on reintroducing the Holocaust curriculum, Hamas again opposed it, calling on the UNRWA to stop implementing "suspicious projects in the context of services it provides to Palestinian refugees".

== See also ==
- The Holocaust and the Nakba
- Textbooks in the Israeli–Palestinian conflict
- Holocaust denial
