= John Shaw Rennie =

British civil servant (1917–2002)

Sir John Shaw Rennie GCMG OBE
- Portrait by Walter Bird, 1962

2nd Commissioner-General of the United Nations Relief and Works Agency
- In office April 1971 – 1977
- Preceded by: Laurence Michelmore
- Succeeded by: Thomas McElhiney

1st Governor-General of Mauritius
- In office 12 March 1968 – 3 September 1968
- Monarch: Elizabeth II
- Prime Minister: Seewoosagur Ramgoolam
- Preceded by: Post created; Himself as governor
- Succeeded by: Michel Rivalland (acting)

Governor of Mauritius
- In office 17 September 1962 – 12 March 1968
- Monarch: Elizabeth II
- Preceded by: Colville Deverell
- Succeeded by: Post abolished; Himself as governor-general

7th Resident Commissioner of the New Hebrides
- In office 1955–1962
- Monarch: Elizabeth II
- Preceded by: Hubert Flaxman
- Succeeded by: Alexander Mair Wilkie

Personal details
- Born: 12 January 1917 Glasgow, Scotland
- Died: 12 August 2002 (aged 85) London, England
- Spouse: Winifred McAlpine Robertson (m. 1946)
- Children: 1

Sir John Shaw Rennie GCMG OBE (12 January 1917 – 12 August 2002) was a British civil servant. He was Commissioner-General for United Nations Relief and Works Agency for Palestine Refugees in the Near East from 1971 to 1977.

== Biography ==
John Rennie was born in Glasgow and educated at Hillhead High School, Glasgow University and Balliol College, Oxford. In 1951 Rennie was appointed Britain's deputy colonial secretary for Mauritius. He was the British Resident in the New Hebrides (now Vanuatu) from 1955 to 1962.

From 1962 to 1968, he was Governor of Mauritius, overseeing Mauritius's transition to independence, including initiating discussions with Seewoosagur Ramgoolam, the Mauritian premier, over the detachment of the Chagos Islands from Mauritian territory.

From 1968 to 1971, Rennie was UNRWA deputy commissioner-general under Laurence Michelmore, who persuaded the then UN secretary-general U Thant to appoint Rennie as his successor.

Rennie married Winifred McAlpine Robertson on 26 February 1946. The couple had one son.

== Honour ==
Rennie was appointed an Officer of the Order of the British Empire (OBE) in the 1955 New Year Honours, and a Companion of the Order of St Michael and St George (CMG) in the 1958 New Year Honours. He was promoted to Knight Commander (KCMG) in 1962, while Governor-designate of Mauritius, and then to Knight Grand Cross (GCMG) in 1968, while he was Governor General designate.

Government offices
| Preceded by Hubert Flaxman | British Resident Commissioner of the New Hebrides; 1955–1962 | Succeeded by Alexander Mair Wilkie |
| Preceded by Colville Deverell | Governor of Mauritius; 1962–1968 | Post abolished Himself as governor-general |
| New creation Himself as governor | Governor-General of Mauritius; 1968 | Succeeded by Michel Rivalland (acting) |
Positions in intergovernmental organisations
| Preceded by (United States) Laurence Michelmore | Commissioner-General for United Nations Relief and Works Agency for Palestine Refugees in the Near East; 1971–1977 | Succeeded by (United States) Thomas McElhiney |
