= Christian Saunders =

British-born United Nations official

Commissioner-General ad interim of UNRWA
- Incumbent
- Assumed office 1 April 2026
- Secretary-General: António Guterres
- Preceded by: Philippe Lazzarini

Special Coordinator on improving the United Nations response to sexual exploitation and abuse
- Incumbent
- Assumed office 15 July 2022
- Secretary-General: António Guterres
- Preceded by: Jane Holl Lute

Personal details
- Children: 3
- Education: University of London, University of Wales

Christian Francis Saunders is a British-born United Nations official currently serving as both the Special Coordinator on improving the United Nations response to sexual exploitation and abuse (since 2022) and acting Commissioner-General of UNRWA (since 2026).

== Education ==
Saunders studied at Royal Holloway College (part of the University of London) and obtained a Master's degree in epidemiology and health planning from University College of Swansea (part of the University of Wales) in 1988.

== Career ==
After graduating from university, Saunders worked for Save the Children in the Sudan, managing a refugee camp for Ethiopian and Eritrean refugees, and later in Mozambique during the civil war there.

Joining the United Nations system, he worked for the United Nations Relief and Works Agency for Palestine Refugees in the Near East (UNRWA) in Gaza, the Office of the United Nations High Commissioner for Refugees (UNHCR) in Rwanda, the United Nations peacekeeping operation in Sarajevo and the United Nations Population Fund (UNFPA).

Saunders held managerial roles in procurement, information and communications technology, and safety and security within the United Nations Secretariat between 2001 and 2013. As Director of the Office of the Under-Secretary-General for Management from 2013 to 2017, he coordinated support for United Nations staff in countries affected by the Western African Ebola epidemic and oversaw the introduction of the Umoja enterprise resource planning software across the United Nations system.

He was an Assistant Secretary-General in the Department of Management from 2018 to 2019 and in the Department of Operational Support from 2019 to 2022. From 2019 to 2020, in the aftermath of financial and leadership challenges at UNRWA, the United Nations Secretary-General, António Guterres, appointed Saunders as acting Commissioner-General of the agency.

In 2022 Saunders was appointed Special Coordinator on improving the United Nations response to sexual exploitation and abuse, succeeding Jane Holl Lute, and in 2026 became Commissioner-General ad interim of UNRWA, succeeding Philippe Lazzarini. On 1 July 2026 he called for emergency funding for UNRWA, warning that the agency's financial situation was "untenable".

== Personal life ==
Saunders is married with three children. In addition to English, he speaks French and some Arabic and Portuguese.
