= List of directors and commissioners-general of UNRWA =

United Nations Relief and Works Agency for Palestine Refugees in the Near East (UNRWA) is a relief and human development agency, providing education, health care, social services and emergency aid to over 4.7 million Palestine refugees living in Jordan, Lebanon and Syria, as well as in the West Bank and the Gaza Strip. It is the only agency dedicated to helping refugees from a specific region or conflict. It is separate from and created before UNHCR, the UN Refugee Agency, which is the only other UN agency aiding refugees, dedicated to aiding all other refugees in the world.

The agency is currently led by Christian Saunders, Commissioner-General ad interim.

== Commissioners-general of UNRWA ==
Since 1962, the head of UNRWA has been titled Commissioner-General:

- Philippe Lazzarini (Switzerland) - appointed Commissioner-General 19 March 2020 by UN Secretary-General António Guterres. His term ended on 31 March 2026.
- Pierre Krähenbühl (Switzerland) - appointed Commissioner-General 30 March 2014 by UN Secretary-General Ban Ki-moon. He resigned on 6 November 2019 amid allegations of corruption and mismanagement.
- Filippo Grandi (Italy) - Commissioner-General from 2010 to 2014, appointed by UN Secretary-General Ban Ki-moon. Grandi served as Deputy Commissioner-General since 2005. Before UNRWA, Grandi had served in UNHCR and other UN organizations.
- Karen Koning AbuZayd (U.S.) - Commissioner-General from 2005 to 2010, appointed by UN Secretary-General Kofi Annan. AbuZayd had worked as chief of mission for UNHCR in Sarajevo during the Bosnian War. AbuZayd is a current member of the Board of Directors at the Middle East Policy Council in Washington D.C..
- Peter Hansen (Denmark) - Commissioner-General from 1996 to 2005, appointed by UN Secretary-General Boutros Boutros-Ghali. Hansen joined the United Nations as Assistant Secretary-General for Programme Planning and Coordination. Between 1985 and 1992, he served as Assistant Secretary-General and Executive Director of the United Nations Centre on Transnational Corporations. In March 1994, he took over the post of Undersecretary-General for Humanitarian Affairs and Emergency Relief Coordinator. When his term ended in March 2005, he was not allowed to stay for another term due to Israeli and US pressure.
- İlter Türkmen (Turkey) - Commissioner-General from 1991 to 1996. Türkmen served as Turkey's ambassador to France, Greece and the USSR. Before that, Türkmen was Turkey's permanent representative to the UN in New York and was representative to the UN in Geneva. Türkmen served from 1979 to 1980 as the Secretary-General's special representative in Thailand, dealing with humanitarian issues. From 1980 to 1983 Türkmen was the foreign minister of Turkey.
- Giorgio Giacomelli (Italy) - Commissioner-General from 1985 to 1991. Giacomelli represented Italy as ambassador to Somalia and Syria. Giacomelli left UNRWA when appointed by Secretary-General Javier Pérez de Cuéllar to become head of the UN's anti-drug campaign.
- Olof Rydbeck (Sweden) - Commissioner-General from 1979 to 1985. Rydbeck represented Sweden at the UN in New York from 1970 to 1976 and was ambassador to the U.K. from 1976 to 1979. Rydbeck was also Director-General of the Swedish Broadcasting Corporation between 1955 and 1970.
- Thomas McElhiney (U.S.) - Commissioner-General from 1977 to 1979. McElhiney had been UNRWA deputy Commissioner-General before his appointment as Commissioner-General. McElhiney served as Inspector-General of the U.S. Foreign Service and U.S. ambassador to Ghana and to Ethiopia.
- John Rennie (U.K.) - Commissioner-General from 1971 to 1977. Rennie had been UNRWA deputy Commissioner-General before his appointment as Commissioner-General. Rennie served as Britain's deputy colonial secretary for Mauritius.
- Laurence Michelmore (U.S.) - Commissioner-General from 1964 to 1971. Michelmore had been senior director of the UN's Technical Assistance Board, deputy director of personnel, and administrative consultant of the UN Special Fund and the Secretary-General's representative on Malaysia.

== List of directors of UNRWA ==
Until 1962, the head of UNRWA was titled Director:

- John Davis (U.S.) - Fourth Director and first Commissioner-General from 1959 to 1963. Davis had been U.S. assistant secretary of agriculture in the Dwight D. Eisenhower administration.
- Henry Labouisse (U.S.) - Director from 1954 to 1958. Labouisse had been the principal State Department official dealing with the implementation of the Marshall Plan. Labouisse left UNRWA to become the head of UNICEF.
- John Blandford Jr. (U.S.) - Director from 1951 to 1953. Blandford served as chairman of the UNRWA Advisory Commission before becoming director of UNRWA. Blandford served as deputy chief of U.S. Economic Cooperation Administration in Greece and a consultant to president Harry Truman on the Marshall Plan.
- Howard Kennedy (Canada) - Director from 1950 to 1951. A former Major-General in the Canadian Army.
