= Laurence Michelmore =

American diplomat

Laurence Michelmore (1909 – April 10, 1997) was UNRWA's Commissioner-General from 1964 to 1971. Michelmore had been senior director of the UN's Technical Assistance Board, deputy director of personnel, and administrative consultant of the UN Special Fund and the Secretary-General's representative on Malaysia.

== See also ==
- List of Directors and Commissioners-General of the United Nations Relief and Works Agency for Palestine Refugees in the Near East

Positions in intergovernmental organisations
Preceded by John Davis ( (United States) )	Commissioner-General for United Nations Relief and Works Agency for Palestine Refugees in the Near East; January 1964–May 1971	Succeeded by John Rennie ( (United Kingdom) )
