= Chris Gunness =

Broadcaster and Myanmar specialist

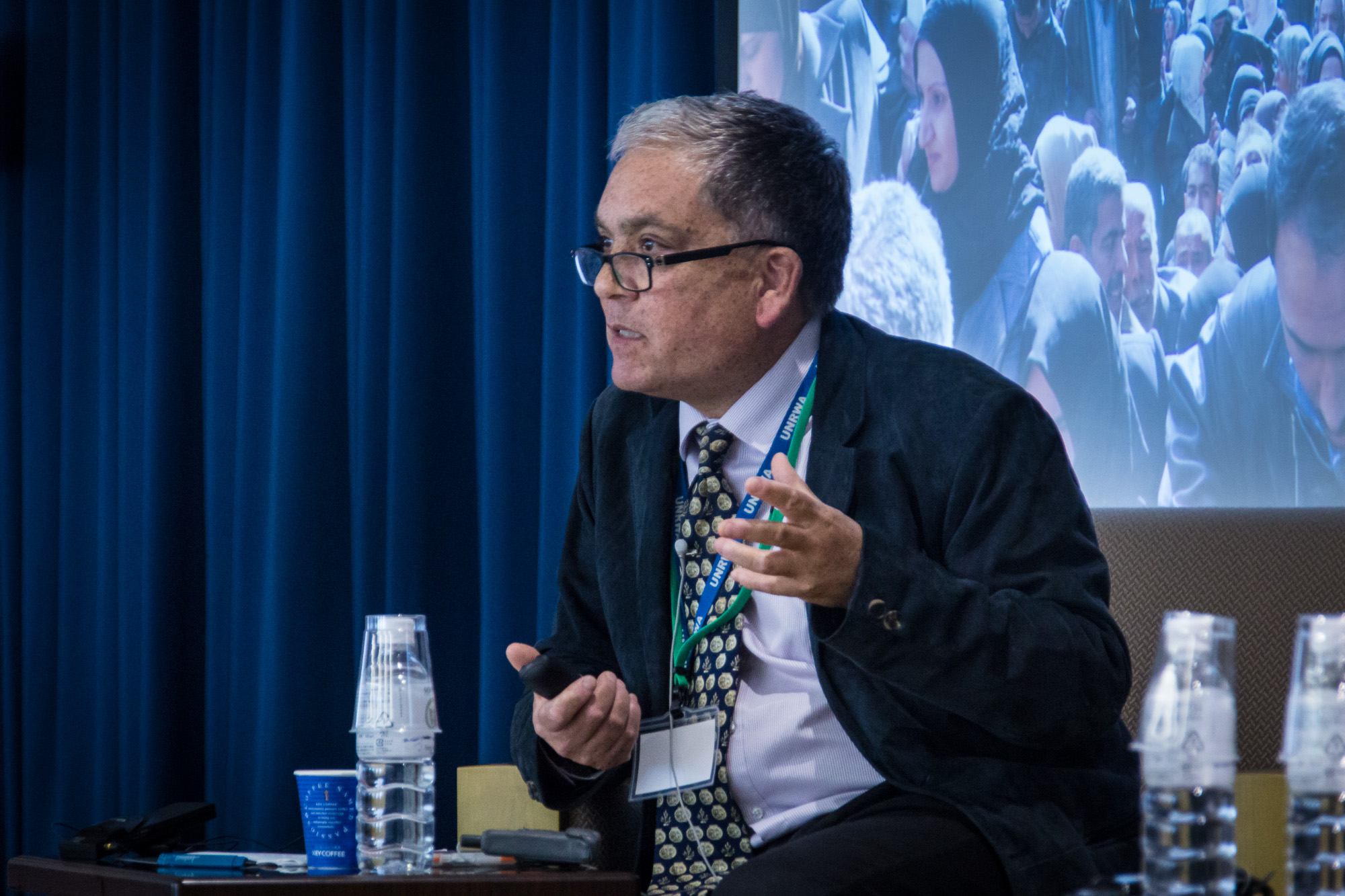
- Born: 1959 (age 66–67); Trinidad, British West Indies
- Education: Ardingly College; University of Oxford
- Organization(s): UNRWA, 2007-2019 Myanmar Accountability Project, 2019-Present

Christopher Robert Paul Gunness (born 1959) is the former chief spokesperson for the United Nations Relief and Works Agency for Palestine Refugees in the Near East (UNRWA). He is currently the Director of the Myanmar Accountability Project.

== Early life ==
Gunness was born in 1959 in what was then the Crown Colony of Trinidad, part of the British West Indies. He was educated in England, initially at Ardingly College, before gaining a scholarship to Oxford University in 1979.

== BBC ==
He joined the BBC as a graduate trainee in 1982. During his 23-year career in broadcasting, he covered all the following roles: producer, studio manager, reporter, correspondent and anchor.

== UNSCO ==
In 2005, Gunness left the BBC to join the United Nations Special Coordinator for the Middle East Peace Process (UNSCO), which was created following the signing of the Oslo Accords. He was a member of a UN mission mandated by the UN to try and halt the Lebanon war in July 2006.

== UNRWA ==
In 2007, he was appointed Spokesman and Director of Strategic Communications at UNRWA.

In 2014, during the war between Israel and Hamas in the Gaza Strip, he made several media appearances.

On 27 July 2014 Gunness was interviewed by David Gregory on Meet the Press; Gregory was criticized for asking Gunness to comment on unverified video footage that Gunness was not able to see.

On 30 July 2014, following a live TV interview from his office in Jerusalem with al Jazeera-Arabic Gunness broke down in tears discussing the shelling of the UNRWA schools in Gaza, which resulted in the death of 15 people.

In 2014, Israel’s U.N. ambassador, Ron Prosor, called for Gunness’s suspension, accusing Gunness of “an ongoing pattern of anti-Israel bias"; Gunness responded by saying: “We guard our neutrality jealously, and we have a plethora of measures that we take to guard our neutrality." This exchange took place against the backdrop of caches of rockets having been discovered at three separate UNRWA schools, and accusations by the Israeli government that UNRWA had turned over one cache of rockets to Hamas; Gunness called these allegations unsubstantiated.

On December 4, 2014, in response to the Jerusalem Post's publication of a piece by Palestinian activist Bassem Eid, Gunness tweeted "boycott the JPost! Don't read their lies!"; in response, the U.S. State Department issued a statement underscoring the importance that UNRWA "uphold its stated policy of neutrality." Through a spokesperson, Gunness claimed that "he was not calling for a boycott against any media outlet but instead was making his objections to a single article."

== Consulting and Myanmar advocacy ==
In 2019, Gunness left the U.N.; he founded the Myanmar Accountability Project, MAP, in 2021, and also runs the consultancy Tiresias Communications. In 2021, Gunness advocated on behalf of Kyaw Zwar Minn, Myanmar's former ambassador to the UK, as means of undermining the legitimacy of the junta that seized power in a coup d'état earlier that year. In September, 2021, MAP assisted in producing a legal opinion regarding which ambassador would be officially credentialed to represent Myanmar at the United Nations.
