= Philippe Lazzarini =

Swiss-Italian humanitarian (born 1964)

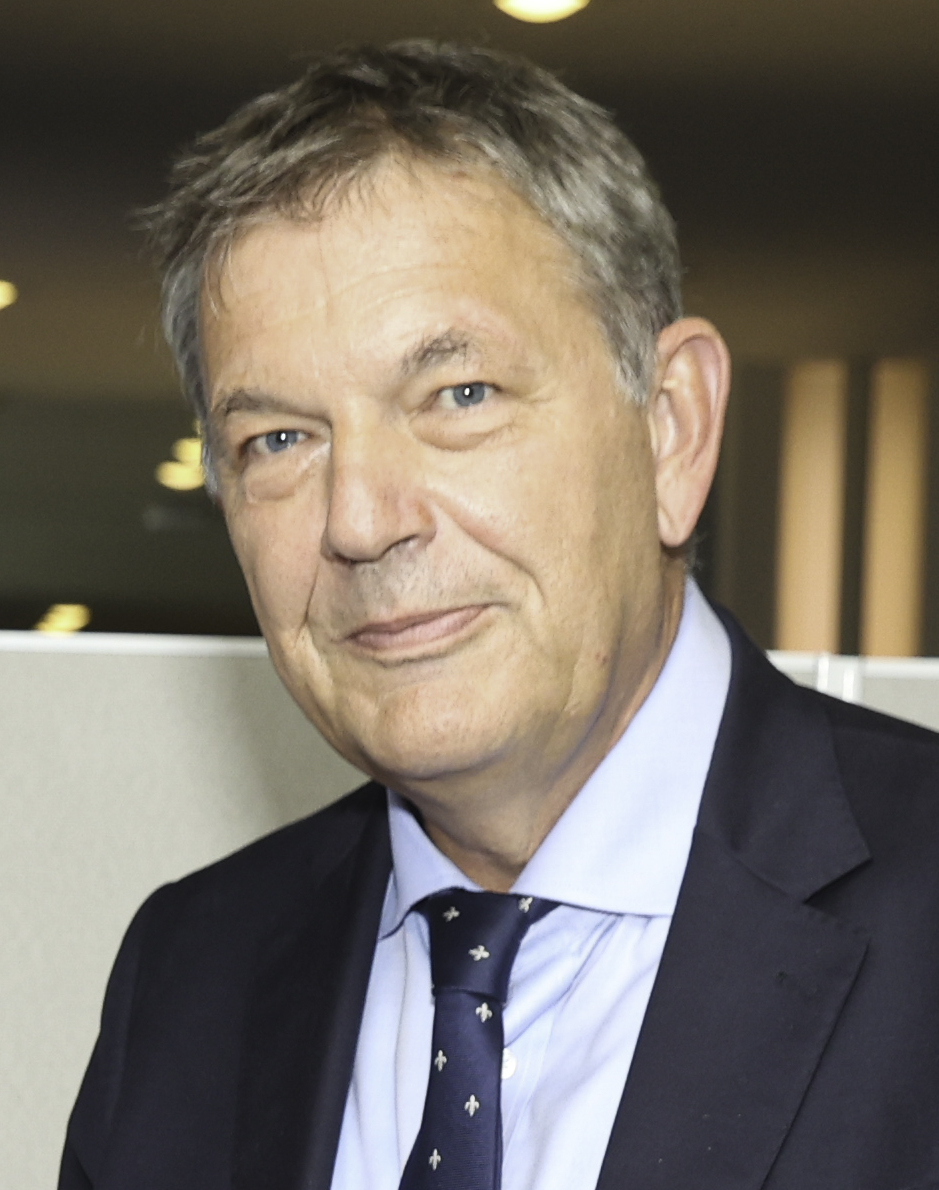
- Lazzarini in September 2025

Commissioner-General of UNRWA
- In office 18 March 2020 – 31 March 2026
- Secretary-General: António Guterres
- Preceded by: Pierre Krähenbühl
- Succeeded by: Christian Saunders (ad interim)

Personal details
- Born: 1964 (age 61–62) Neuchâtel, Switzerland
- Spouse: Antonia Mulvey
- Children: 4
- Education: University of Neuchâtel (BA); University of Lausanne (MBA)
- Occupation: Humanitarian

Philippe Lazzarini (French: [filip lazaʁini], Italian: [fiˈlip laddzaˈriːni]; born 1964) is a Swiss humanitarian who served as Commissioner-General of the United Nations Relief and Works Agency for Palestine Refugees in the Near East (UNRWA) from 2020 to 2026.

== Early life and education ==
Born in Neuchâtel to Italian immigrants, Lazzarini holds a Masters in Business Administration from the Faculty of Business and Economics of the University of Lausanne and a Bachelor's degree in economics from the University of Neuchâtel.

== Career ==
Lazzarini started his international career in 1989 when he joined the International Committee of the Red Cross (ICRC) and served as delegate in multiple duty stations, including southern Sudan, Lebanon, Jordan, and the Gaza Strip. Lazzarini then led the ICRC operations in Bosnia, Angola, and Rwanda. He served as Deputy Head of the ICRC Communications Department. In September 1999, Lazzarini joined the Union Bancaire Privée bank in Geneva as head of the Marketing Department where he worked on corporate social responsibility and the bank's ethical investment agenda.

In 2003, Lazzarini joined the UN Office for the Coordination of Humanitarian Affairs (OCHA) as Area Coordinator in Mosul, Iraq. He then served as Head of Office for OCHA in Angola, Somalia, and the occupied Palestinian territory. In 2010, he became the Deputy Director of the Coordination and Response Division for OCHA in its headquarters in New York City. In 2013, he was appointed, under the leadership of Nicholas Kay, as the Deputy Special Representative of the Secretary-General, UN Resident and Humanitarian Coordinator and Resident Representative of the United Nations Development Programme (UNDP) in Somalia. On 24 April 2015, United Nations Secretary-General Ban Ki-moon announced the Lazzarini's appointment as his Deputy Special Coordinator for Lebanon, where he also served as Resident and Humanitarian Coordinator and UNDP Resident Representative, succeeding Ross Mountain; in this capacity, he worked under the leadership of successive Special Coordinators Sigrid Kaag (2015-2017), Pernille Dahler Kardel (2017–2019) and Ján Kubiš (2019–2020).

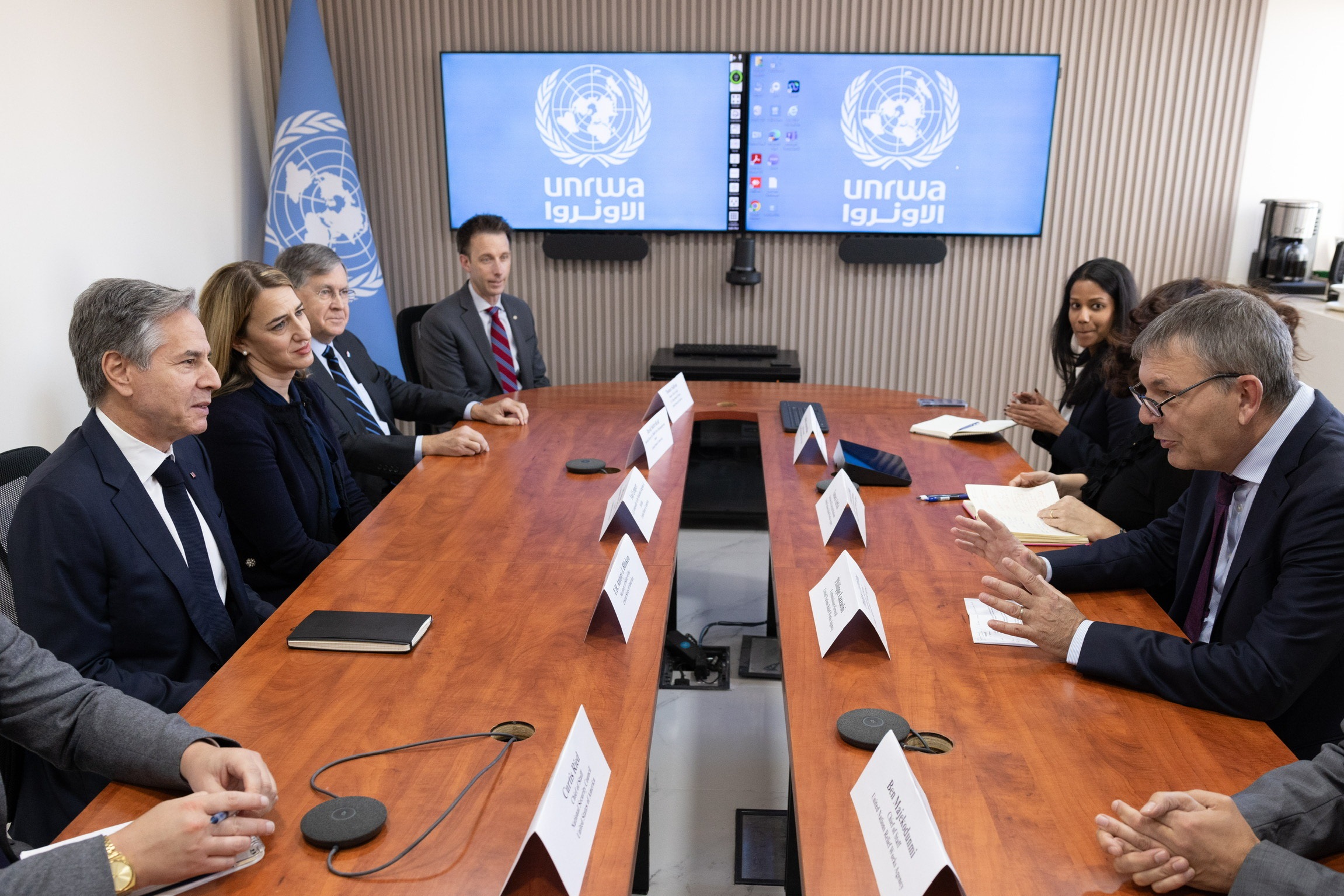
Lazzarini with US Secretary Antony Blinken in Amman, Jordan, 4 November 2023

In 2020, UN Secretary-General António Guterres announced Lazzarini's appointment as the new Commissioner-General of the United Nations Relief and Works Agency for Palestine Refugees in the Near East (UNRWA).

In 2023, Lazzarini criticized the Israeli blockade of the Gaza Strip. He described the Gaza Strip as a "graveyard of a population trapped between war, siege and deprivation", saying that "we will not be able to say we did not know. History will ask why the world did not have the courage to act decisively and stop this hell on Earth." On 9 February 2024, Lazzarini said that Israel blocked food for 1.1 million Palestinians in Gaza.

Since the war in Gaza began in October 2023, Lazzarini sent two letters to the United Nations General Assembly President on 7 December 2023 and 22 February 2024. He briefed the UN Security Council on the "unprecedented humanitarian crisis" in the Gaza Strip and "attacks against UNRWA" on 30 October 2023 and 17 April 2024. On 4 March 2024, he addressed the UN General Assembly.

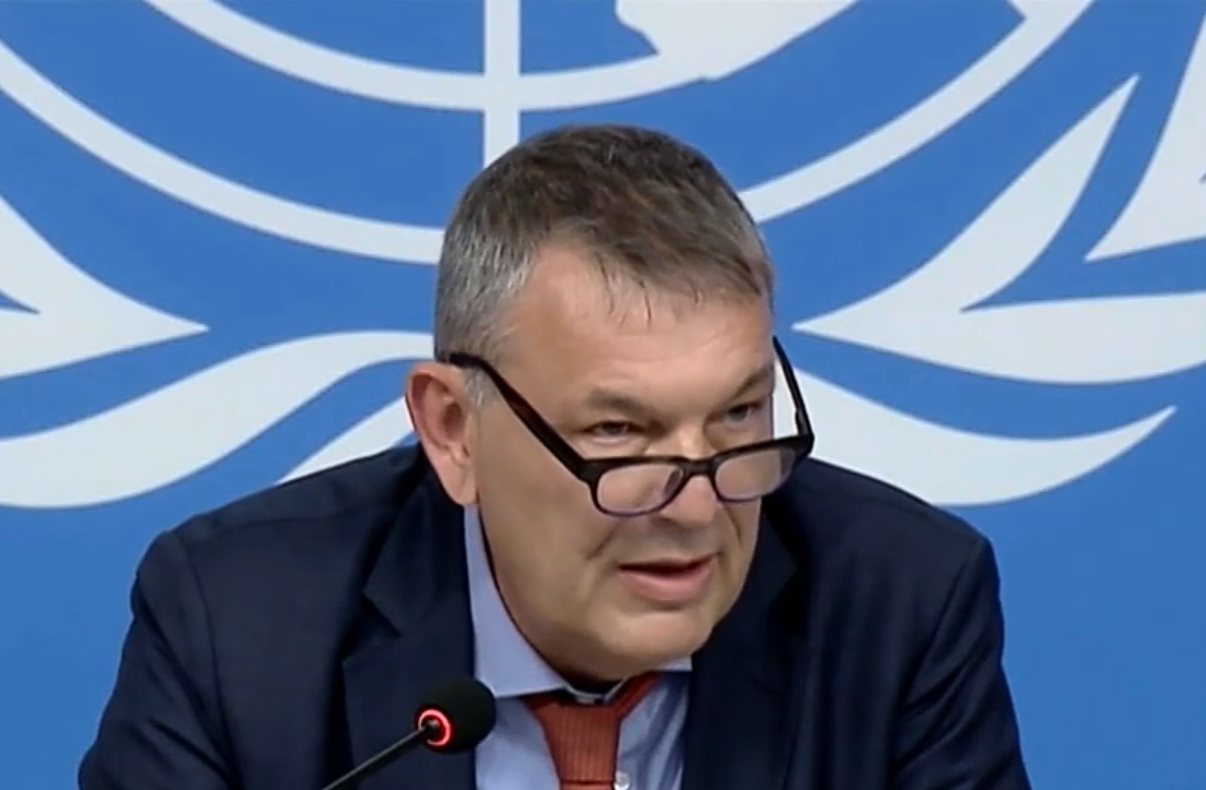
Lazzarini in December 2024

UNRWA, Lazzarini and other top UNRWA officials are co-defendants in a high-profile lawsuit by the October 7 attack victims alleging that "the defendants are liable for aiding and abetting Hamas' genocide, crimes against humanity, and torture."

His term as Commissioner-General ended on 31 March 2026.

== Personal life ==
Lazzarini is married to British lawyer Antonia Mulvey, executive director of Legal Action Worldwide (LAW), and has four children born between 2009 and 2018.

== Publications and interviews ==
- Philippe Lazzarini, "UNRWA: Stop Israel's Violent Campaign Against Us", The New York Times, 30 May 2024
- "Thirty days to save UNRWA: following UN agency chief Philippe Lazzarini in his race against time", France 24, April 2024
- UNRWA Commissioner-General Philippe Lazzarini on CNN with Christiane Amanpour, 28 February 2024
- UNRWA Commissioner-General Philippe Lazzarini on Talk to Al Jazeera with James Bays, 13 December 2023
- Philippe Lazzarini, "We must prevent humanitarian aid from being used as a weapon of war", Los Angeles Times, 9 December 2023
- Philippe Lazzarini on HARDtalk with Stephen Sackur, 30 November 2023
- Philippe Lazzarini, "The carnage must stop. Time for a ceasefire in Gaza", The Washington Post, 8 November 2023
- UNRWA Commissioner-General Philippe Lazzarini on CNN with Christiane Amanpour, 2 November 2023
- Philippe Lazzarini, "I run the UN agency for Palestine Refugees. History will judge us all if there is no ceasefire in Gaza", The Guardian, 26 October 2023
- Philippe Lazzarini and Martin Griffiths, "Humanity must prevail in Gaza", The Financial Times, 17 October 2023
- "Time to revitalize Lebanon’s economy", The Daily Star (Lebanon) 17 June 2016
- "Les leçons apprises du Liban au Sommet mondial sur l’action humanitaire", L'Orient-Le Jour, 25 April 2016
- "Pulling Lebanon back from the edge of the crisis", The Daily Star (Lebanon), 28 January 2016
- "Lebanon’s silent heroes", The Daily Star (Lebanon), 19 August 2015
- Lazzarini to place Lebanon's needs as top priority on global agenda, As-Safir, 15 January 2016
- Lazzarini interview with Annahar Newspaper, 30 September 2015
- Somalia: Early warning should trigger early action (VIDEO), United Nations Office for the Coordination of Humanitarian Affairs, 22 October 2014
- United Nations Office for the Coordination of Humanitarian Affairs
