= John Ging =

Irish Army officer (born 1965)

John Ging (born 1965) is an Irish humanitarian and senior United Nations official. Since February 2011, he has served as the director of the Operational Division at the United Nations Office for the Coordination of Humanitarian Affairs (OCHA) in New York. In this role, he oversees the management of OCHA's field operations globally and acts as the primary point of contact for supporting Humanitarian Coordinator on behalf of the Emergency Relief Coordinator. He also serves as the principal adviser to the Under-Secretary-General for Humanitarian Affairs on operational matters.

Before joining OCHA, Ging was the director of Operations for the United Nations Relief and Works Agency for Palestine Refugees in the Near East (UNRWA) in the Gaza Strip from 2006 to 2011.

Earlier in his career, Ging held a range of humanitarian and peacekeeping positions in the Balkans, Africa, and the Middle East. In Kosovo, he was Chief of Staff of the Institution Building Pillar within the United Nations Mission in Kosovo (UNMIK). Prior to that, he served for eight years as Chief of Staff with the Organization for Security and Co-operation in Europe (OSCE) Mission to Bosnia and Herzegovina. From 1994 to 1996, during and after the Rwandan genocide, he worked as Regional Field Director for the Irish non-governmental organization GOAL. His responsibilities included coordination of emergency relief efforts in refugee camps affected by cholera. Between 1989 and 1994, he completed three tours of duty as a United Nations peacekeeper with the United Nations Interim Force in Lebanon (UNIFIL). Ging began his professional career in 1983 as a commissioned officer in the Irish Defence Forces.

He holds a Barrister-at-Law qualification and is a graduate of the National University of Ireland, Galway (NUI Galway), where he earned both undergraduate and postgraduate degrees in law, sociology, and political science.

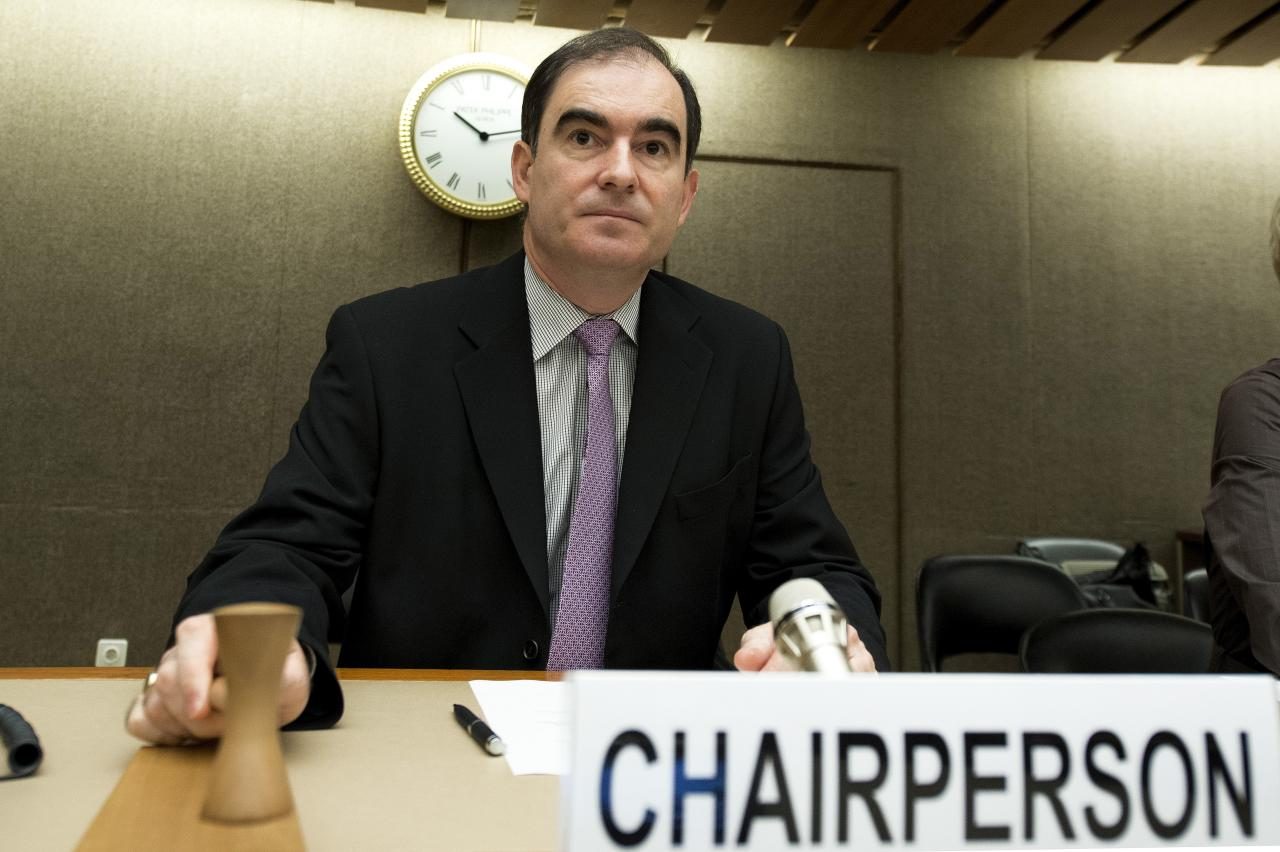
John Ging, director, Coordination and Response Division, United Nations Office for the Coordination of Humanitarian Affairs (OCHA) opens the Syrian Humanitarian Forum. 16 July 2012

== Early life ==
Ging was raised in County Laois, Ireland, and completed his secondary education at Salesian College in Ballinakill. He joined the Irish Army in 1983 and attained the rank of captain during his service.

== Director of UNRWA Operations in Gaza ==
Ging assumed the role of Director of Operations for the United Nations Relief and Works Agency (UNRWA) in the Gaza Strip in February 2006. In this capacity, he oversaw a workforce of more than 11,000 personnel and administered programmes with an annual budget exceeding US$450 million. These programmes provided services including education, healthcare, social assistance, microcredit, infrastructure development, and emergency support to over one million Palestine refugees.

During his tenure in Gaza, Ging was the target of multiple security incidents. In March 2007, his convoy was attacked by armed individuals, resulting in damage to his vehicle but no reported injuries. A subsequent incident occurred in Rafah in mid-2007, during which an attack by armed assailants led to the death of one individual and injuries to seven others. In 2010, Ging received additional threats to his safety.

=== The Gaza War (2008–09) ===
During the conflict in Gaza between December 2008 and January 2009, Ging became a visible figure in international humanitarian discussions due to his public emphasis on the protection of civilians affected by the hostilities. While based in Gaza, he made repeated appeals for an end to military operations and underscored the responsibilities of the international community to safeguard non-combatants without access to safe shelter. Approximately 50,000 civilians were displaced and sought refuge in UNRWA schools during the conflict.

Several United Nations facilities, including the main UNRWA compound in Gaza City, were damaged by fire from the Israel Defense Forces (IDF) during the conflict. Following the death of a staff member, Ging temporarily suspended aid convoys; operations resumed after coordination mechanisms for humanitarian corridors were improved. Aid deliveries were suspended again shortly afterward in response to the confiscation of an UNRWA aid convoy by Hamas. The organization subsequently returned the aid and provided assurances that such incidents would not occur again.

== Awards ==
Ging was awarded an honorary degree by NUI Galway in 2019 for his lifelong commitment to humanitarism.
