= UNRWA =

UN agency supporting Palestinian refugees

- United Nations Relief and Works Agency for Palestine Refugees in the Near East
- Abbreviation: UNRWA
- Formation: 8 December 1949; 76 years ago
- Type: United Nations programme
- Headquarters: Amman, Jordan; Gaza, Palestine
- Region served: Levant
- Services: Education; health care; relief/social services; infrastructure/camp improvement; microfinancial assistance; emergency response
- Fields: Humanitarian aid
- Commissioner-General ad interim: Christian Saunders
- Deputy Commissioner-Generals: Natalie Boucly (Note: Deputy Commissioner-General (Programmes and Partnerships), appointed 6 December 2023.); Antonia Marie De Meo (Note: Deputy Commissioner-General (Operational Support), appointed 8 February 2024.)
- Parent organization: United Nations
- Budget: US$806 million (2020)
- Staff: 30,000
- Website: unrwa.org

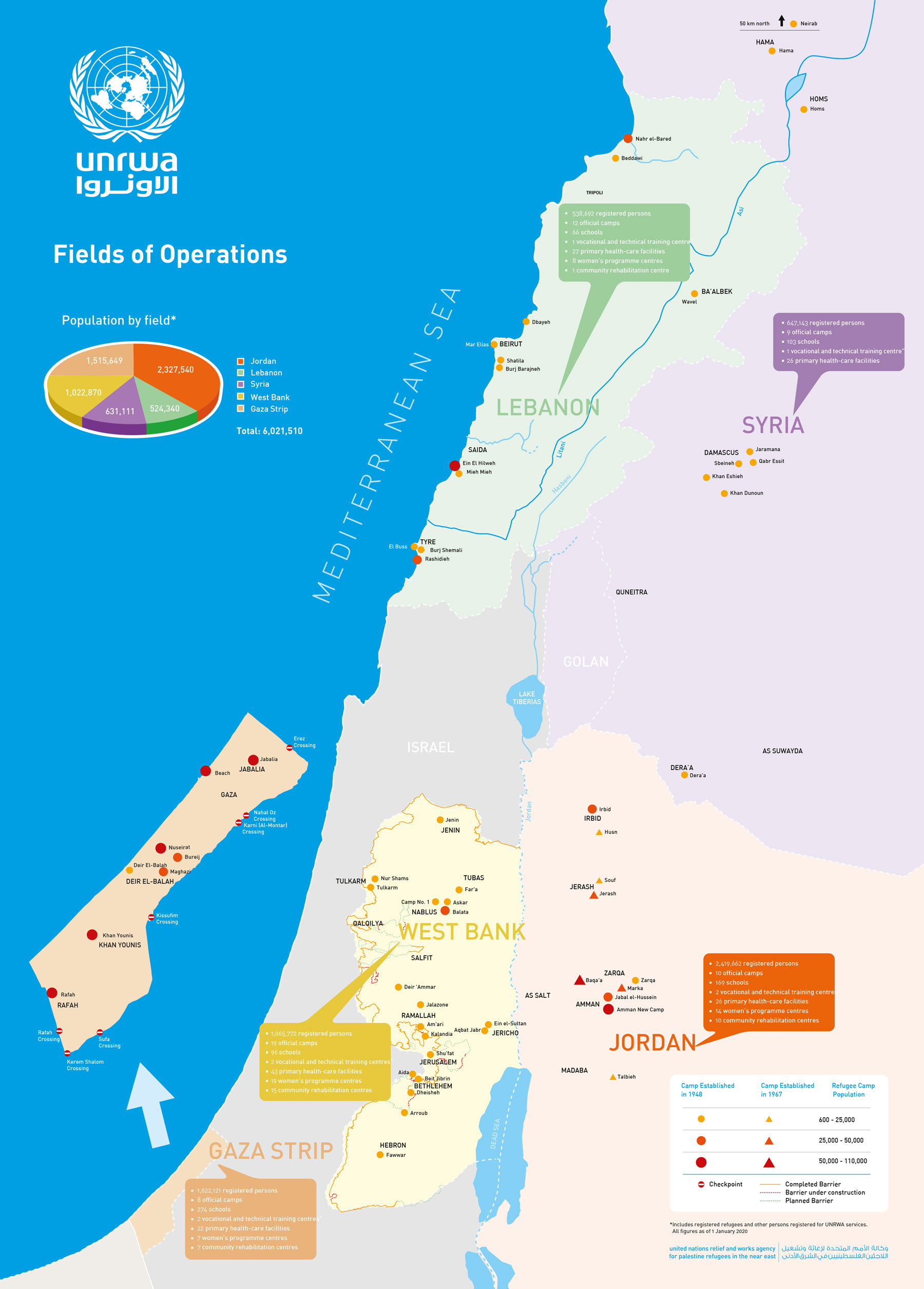
UNRWA operations, as of 1 January 2020

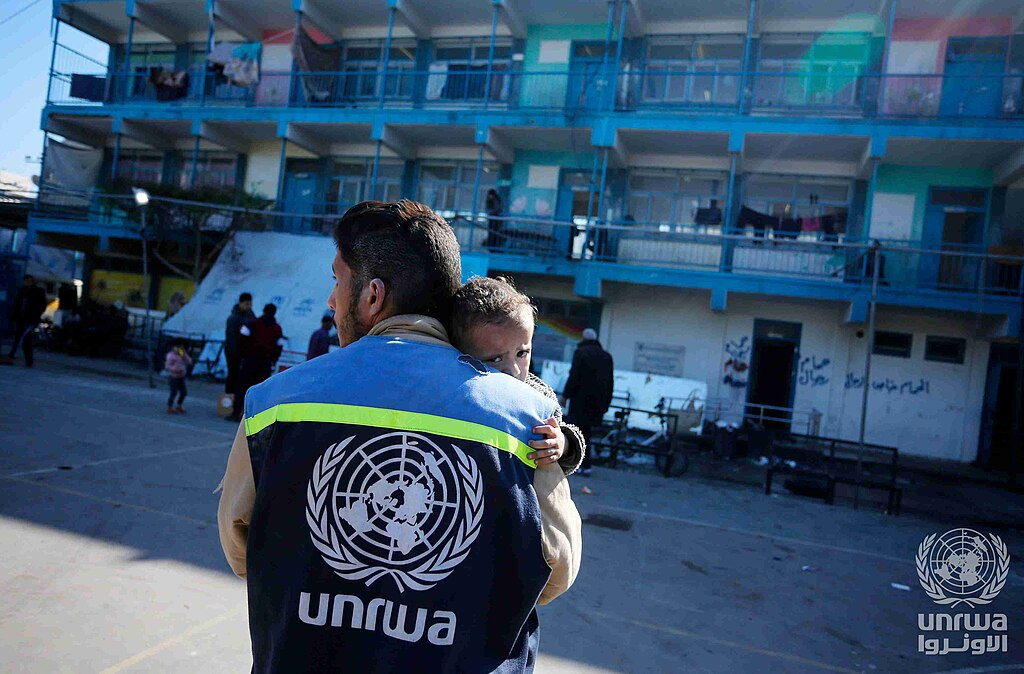
UNRWA staff member comforts a distressed child at a school shelter in Nuseirat camp, Gaza Strip.

The United Nations Relief and Works Agency for Palestine Refugees in the Near East (Note: Arabic: وكالة الأمم المتحدة لإغاثة وتشغيل لاجئي فلسطين في الشرق الأدنى, romanized: wikālat al-Umam al-Muttaḥida li-iġāṯa wa-tašġīl lājiʾī Filasṭīn fī š-Šarq al-Adnā.) (UNRWA, pronounced /ˈʌnrə/) (Note: Arabic: الأونروا, romanized: al-Ūnarwā or al-Ūnurwā.) is a UN agency that supports the relief and human development of Palestinian refugees. UNRWA's mandate encompasses Palestinians who fled or were expelled during the Nakba, the 1948 Palestine war, and subsequent conflicts, as well as their descendants, including legally adopted children. As of 2026, more than 5.9 million Palestinians are registered with UNRWA as refugees.

UNRWA was established in 1949 by the UN General Assembly (UNGA) to provide relief to all refugees resulting from the 1948 conflict; this initially included Jewish and Arab Palestine refugees inside the State of Israel until the Israeli government took over this responsibility in 1952. As a subsidiary body of the UNGA, UNRWA's mandate is subject to periodic renewal every three years; it has consistently been extended since its founding, most recently until 30 June 2029.

UNRWA employs over 30,000 people, most of them Palestinian refugees, and a small number of international staff. Originally intended to provide employment and direct relief, its mandate has broadened to include providing education, health care, and social services to its target population. UNRWA operates in five areas: Jordan, Lebanon, Syria, the Gaza Strip, and the West Bank (including East Jerusalem). Aid for Palestinian refugees outside these five areas is provided by the United Nations High Commissioner for Refugees (UNHCR), established in 1950 as the main agency to aid all other refugees worldwide. UNRWA is the only UN agency dedicated to helping refugees from a specific region or conflict. (Note: Unlike UNRWA, UNHCR has a specific mandate to assist refugees in eliminating their refugee status by local integration in the current country, resettlement in a third country or repatriation when possible. See Miller, Elhanan (June 2012). "Palestinian Refugees and the Israeli-Palestinian Peace Negotiations" (PDF). International Centre for the Study of Radicalisation and Political Violence. Archived from the original (PDF) on 7 February 2016. Retrieved 17 January 2015.)

UNRWA has received praise and recognition for its work by various governments, public figures, and independent monitors. It has also been subject to controversy related to its operations, role in the Gaza Strip, relationship with Hamas and terrorism, and textbook content. Most recently, the agency faced allegations by the Israeli government that twelve of its employees were involved in the October 7 attacks, leading to lay-offs, an investigation, and the temporary suspension of funding by numerous donors. As of May 2024, several major donors have since resumed funding as the investigation remains ongoing. In October 2024, Israel's parliament passed a bill designating UNRWA as a terrorist group and prohibiting it from operating within the country. Israel has long opposed the Palestinian right of return and has accused UNRWA of "perpetuating the refugee issue". In January 2025, Israel's UNRWA ban went into effect.

In October 2025, the International Court of Justice (ICJ) found that "Israel has not substantiated its allegations that a significant part of UNRWA’s employees are ‘members of Hamas… or other terrorist factions”.

== History and operations ==
Following the outbreak of the 1948 Palestine war and the 1948 Palestinian expulsion and flight, which displaced approximately 750,000 Palestinian Arabs, the United Nations General Assembly passed Resolution 212 (III), dated 19 November 1948, which established the UN Relief for Palestine Refugees (UNRPR) to provide emergency relief to Palestinian refugees in coordination with other UN or humanitarian agencies. In response to the political aspects of the conflict, less than a month later the General Assembly adopted Resolution 194, creating the United Nations Conciliation Commission for Palestine (UNCCP), mandated to help achieve a final settlement between the warring parties, including facilitating "the repatriation, resettlement and economic and social rehabilitation of the refugees" in collaboration with the UNRPR. By that time, the conflict had displaced over 700,000 people.

Total number of Palestinian refugees registered by UNRWA (1950–2008)

Unable to resolve the "Palestine problem" which required political solutions beyond the scope of its mandate, the UNCCP recommended the creation of a "United Nations agency designed to continue relief activities and initiate job-creation projects" while an ultimate resolution was pending. Pursuant to this recommendation and to paragraph 11 of Resolution 194 which concerned refugees, on 8 December 1949 the General Assembly adopted Resolution 302(IV) which established the United Nations Relief and Works Agency for Palestine Refugees in the Near East (UNRWA). The resolution was adopted and passed unopposed, supported by Israel and the Arab states with only the Soviet bloc and South Africa abstaining.

UNRWA succeeded the UNRPR with a broader mandate for humanitarian assistance and development and the requirement to function neutrally. When it began operations in 1950 the initial scope of its work was "direct relief and works programmes" to Palestine refugees in order to "prevent conditions of starvation and distress… and to further conditions of peace and stability". UNRWA's mandate was expanded in December 1950 through Resolution 393(V) which instructed the agency to "establish a reintegration fund which shall be utilized ... for the permanent re-establishment of refugees and their removal from relief". A 26 January 1952 resolution allocated four times as much funding on reintegration than on relief, requesting UNRWA to otherwise continue providing programs for health care, education, and general welfare.

=== Definition of refugee ===
UNRWA has developed its own working definition of "refugee" to allow it to provide humanitarian assistance. Its definition does not cover final status.

Palestine refugees are "persons whose regular place of residence was Palestine during the period 1 June 1946 to 15 May 1948, and who lost both home and means of livelihood as a result of the 1948 conflict."

The Six-Day War of 1967 generated a new wave of Palestinian refugees who could not be included in the original UNRWA definition. Since 1991, the UN General Assembly has adopted an annual resolution allowing the 1967 refugees within the UNRWA mandate. UNRWA's "mandate" is not a single document but the sum of all relevant resolutions and requests of the General Assembly. While focused on Palestine refugees, it also extends to persons displaced by "the 1967 and subsequent hostilities" and occasionally to a broader cross-section of the local community. Several categories of persons have long been registered as eligible to receive UNRWA services although not "Palestine refugees". The descendants of Palestine refugee males, including adopted children, are also eligible for registration as refugees.

== Organisation and mandate ==
UNRWA is a subsidiary organ of the United Nations General Assembly, established pursuant to Articles 7(2) and 22 of the UN Charter. It is one of two UN agencies that reports directly to the General Assembly. (Note: The other agency is the United Nations Institute for Disarmament Research (UNIDIR).) The scope and renewal of UNRWA's mandate is determined primarily by resolutions of the General Assembly; unlike other UN agencies, such as the World Health Organization or the Office of the UN High Commissioner for Refugees, it lacks a constitution or statute. The mandate may also be shaped by requests from other UN organs, such as the Secretary-General. The General Assembly passes a series of resolutions annually that address UNRWA's responsibilities, functions, and budget. As it is technically a temporary organisation, the agency's mandate is extended every three years.

UNRWA is led by a Commissioner-General responsible for managing all of the agency's activities and personnel. The Commissioner-General selects and appoints all the agency's staff, pursuant to internal rules and regulations, and reports directly to the General Assembly. Since 1 April 2026, UNRWA has been led by a Commissioner-General ad interim, Christian Saunders. UNRWA's operations are organised into five fields—Jordan, Syria, Lebanon, West Bank, and Gaza—each led by a director who is in charge of distributing humanitarian aid and overseeing general UNRWA operations. The agency's headquarters are divided between the Gaza Strip and Amman, with the latter hosting the Deputy Commissioner-General, currently Leni Stenseth of Norway, who administers departmental activities such as education, healthcare, and finance. UNRWA is the largest agency of the United Nations, employing over 30,000 staff, 99% of which are locally recruited Palestinians.

=== Advisory Commission ===
Concurrent with the creation of UNRWA, the UN General Assembly established an Advisory Commission (AdCom) to assist the Commissioner-General in carrying out UNRWA's mandate. Created with four members, the AdCom currently has 28 members and four observers. Membership is obtained via General Assembly resolutions, with all host countries of Palestinian refugees (Jordan, Syria, Lebanon) sitting on the commission followed by the 24 leading donors and supporters of UNRWA. Palestine, the European Union (EU), and the League of Arab States have had observer status since 2005, with the Organisation for Islamic Cooperation joining as an observer in 2019.

Members of the AdCom, including the year they joined, are: Australia (2005), Belgium (1953), Brazil (2014), Canada (2005), Denmark (2005), Egypt (1949), Finland (2008), France (1949), Germany (2005), Ireland (2008), Italy (2005), Japan (1973), Jordan (1949), Kazakhstan (2013), Kuwait (2010), Lebanon (1953), Luxembourg (2012), Netherlands (2005), Norway (2005), Qatar (2018), Saudi Arabia (2005), Spain (2005), Sweden (2005), Switzerland (2005), Syria (1949), Turkey (1949), United Arab Emirates (2014), the United Kingdom (1949), and the United States (1949).

The Advisory Commission is led by a chair and a vice-chair, representing a host country and a donor country, respectively. Each is appointed annually in June from among the Commission members according to the alphabetical rotation, serving for one year beginning 1 July. At each appointment, the chair will alternate between a host and a donor country.

The AdCom meets twice a year, usually in June and November, to discuss important issues of UNRWA and develop a consensus-based guidance for the Commissioner-General. Additionally, members and observers convene more regularly through sub-committee meetings. The AdCom also conducts periodic field visits to UNRWA's area of operations.

=== Areas of operation ===
UNRWA services are available to all registered Palestine refugees living in its area of operations who need assistance. When UNRWA began operations in 1950, it was responding to the needs of about 700,000 Palestinian refugees. By 2023, some 5.9 million people were registered as eligible for UNRWA services. UNRWA provides facilities in 59 recognized refugee camps in Jordan, Lebanon, Syria, the West Bank, and the Gaza Strip, and in other areas where large numbers of registered Palestine refugees live outside of recognized camps.

For a camp to be recognized by UNRWA, there must be an agreement between the host government and UNRWA governing the use of the camp. UNRWA does not itself run camps, has no police powers or administrative role, but simply provides services in the camp. Refugee camps, which developed from tent cities to dense urban dwellings similar to their urban surroundings, house around one-third of all registered Palestine refugees.

== Funding ==
2022 UNRWA funding by country in US dollars: Over $100,000,000 Over $50,000,000 Over $25,000,000 Over $10,000,000 / Over $5,000,000 Over $1,000,000 Under $1,000,000 No donations

UNRWA's budget is set by the UN General Assembly and derives almost entirely from voluntary contributions by UN member states. It also receives some revenue from the regular UN budget, mostly for international staffing costs. In addition to its regular budget, UNRWA receives funding for emergency activities and special projects, such as in response to the Syrian civil war and the COVID-19 pandemic.

Historically, most of the agency's funds came from the United States and the European Commission; in 2019, close to 60 percent of its pledge of $1 billion came from EU countries, with Germany being the largest individual donor. The next largest donors were the EU, United Kingdom, Sweden, and the United Arab Emirates, followed by Saudi Arabia, France, Japan, Qatar, and the Netherlands. UNRWA also establishes partnerships with nongovernmental donors, including nonprofit "national committees" based in donor countries.

The voluntary nature of UNRWA funding has led to budgetary problems due to acute emergencies or political developments in donor countries. In 2009, officials spoke of a "dire financial crisis", including a funding shortfall of $200 million, in the wake of the Israeli offensive in Gaza. In August 2018, the U.S. ceased its contributions, arguing that UNRWA's mandate should be reduced to the few hundred thousand Palestinians alive when the agency was created. The U.S. decision resulted in the loss of $300 million out of the $1.2 billion budget, contributing to an overall deficit of $446 million. The shortfall was covered with increased contributions from elsewhere.

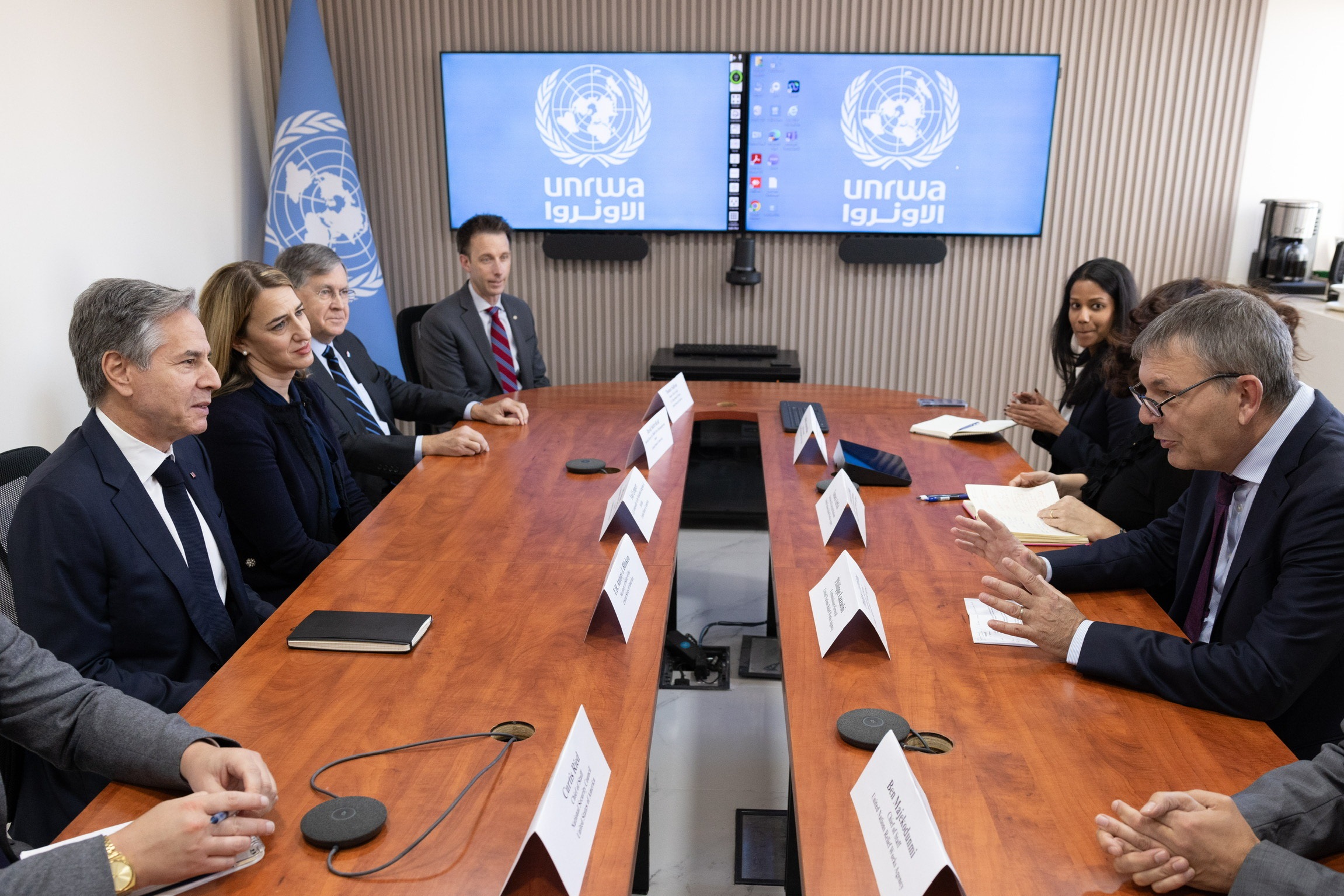
Former UNRWA Commissioner-General Philippe Lazzarini with US Secretary Antony Blinken in Amman, Jordan, 4 November 2023

In mid-2019, the Netherlands, Belgium, and Switzerland temporarily suspended funding to UNRWA, citing ethics report that alleged mismanagement, corruption, and discrimination among the agency's leadership. In December 2019, the Netherlands restored its funding, increasing its donation by €6 million for 2019, to €19 million. The EU increased its contribution from €82 million ($92.2 million) by €21 million ($23.3 million), and Germany agreed to fund four new UNRWA projects, totaling €59 million ($65.6 million). Qatar increased its donation for Palestinians in Syria by $20.7 million, bringing the 2019 total to $40 million.

The funding situation for 2019 and beyond was discussed in April at a "Ministerial Strategic Dialogue" attended by representatives from Egypt, France, Germany, Japan, Kuwait, Norway, United Kingdom, the European External Action Service, and the European Commission. At the annual meeting of the General Assembly that year, a high-level ministerial meeting was held regarding UNRWA funding. In July 2020 Commissioner-General Lazzarini warned that UNRWA's budget was "not sustainable", with shortfalls in four out of the five previous years, and funding at its lowest point since 2012. According to the World Bank, for all countries receiving more than $2 billion in international aid in 2012, Gaza and the West Bank received a per capita aid budget over double the next largest recipient, at a rate of $495.

In January 2010, the Government of Canada announced that it was redirecting aid previously earmarked to UNRWA to projects under the Palestinian Authority. Previously, Canada provided UNRWA with 11 percent of its budget at $10 million (Canadian) annually. The decision came despite positive internal evaluations of the Agency by CIDA officials. The 2010 Canadian decision put it very much at odds with the US and EU, which maintained or increased their levels of funding. Some suggested that the decision also cost Canada international support in its failed October 2010 effort to obtain a seat on the UN Security Council. Documents obtained from CIDA revealed that even the government of Israel opposed the Canadian move which had asked Canada to resume contributions to UNRWA's General Fund.

EU suspended funding for UNRWA in January 2024 but reinstated the funding later on 1 March 2024. In 2024, the Swiss National Council voted to cut finding to UNRWA, citing concerns of antisemitism and connections to terrorism; the legislation will need to pass Council of States to go into effect. In August 2026, Finland announced that it will discontinue financial aid moving into next year.

== Operations ==
UNRWA provides a wide variety of social and humanitarian services, as determined by resolutions of the UN General Assembly. Since its initial establishment in 1949, its operations have expanded beyond immediate relief and social services; as of 2019, the bulk of its budget is spent on education (58 percent), followed by health care (15 percent), and general support services (13 percent).

=== Education programme ===
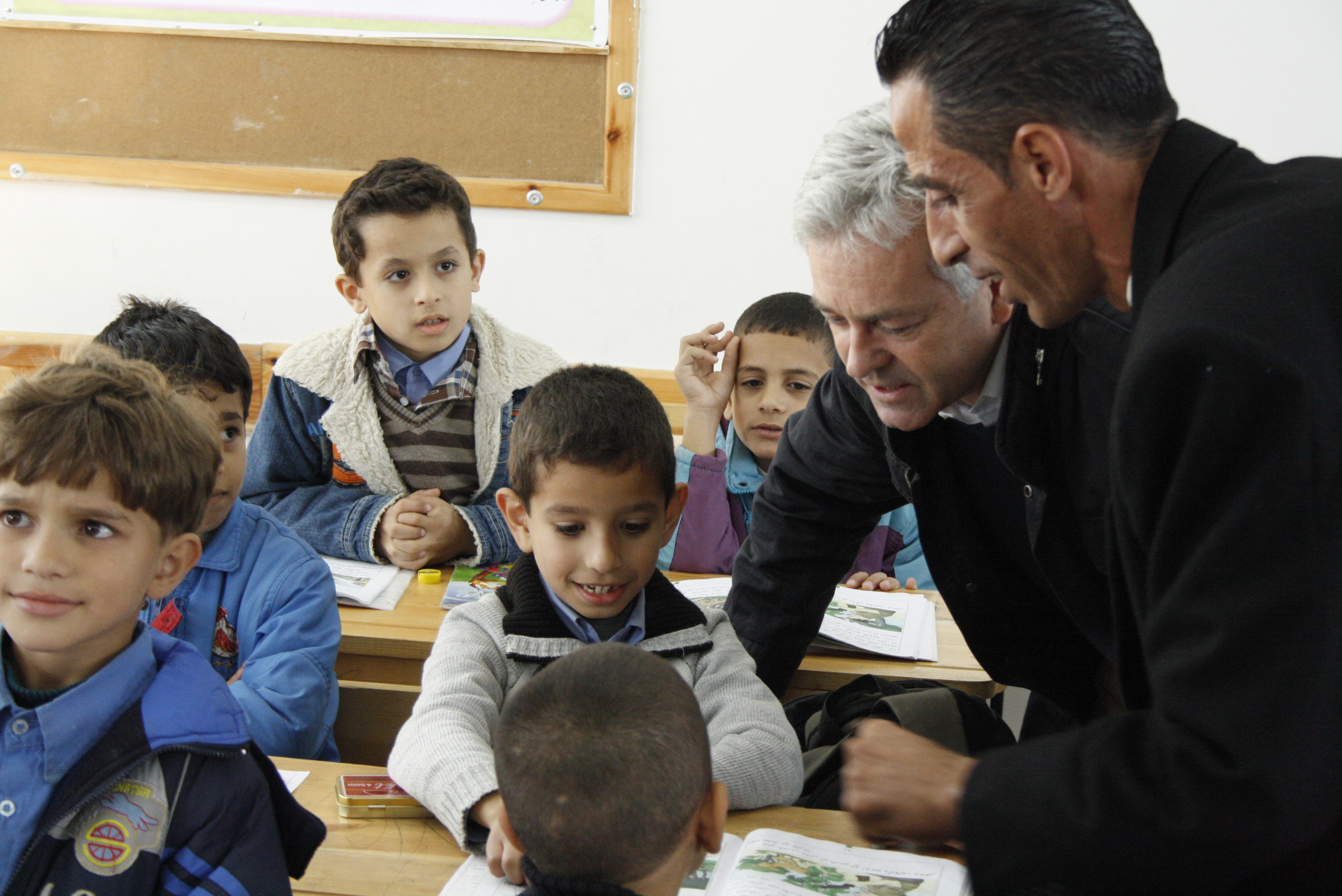
British politician Alan Duncan talking to schoolchildren at a school supported by UNRWA and UKaid in Gaza, 10 December 2012

Education is UNRWA's largest area of activity, accounting for more than half its regular budget and the majority of its staff. It operates one of the largest school systems in the Middle East, spanning 711 elementary and preparatory schools, eight vocational and technical schools, and two teacher training institutes. It has been the main provider of basic education to Palestinian refugee children since 1950. Free basic education is available to all registered refugee children, currently numbering 526,000. In the 1960s, UNRWA schools became the first in the region to achieve full gender equality, and a slight majority of enrolled students are female.

Half the Palestine refugee population is under 25. Overcrowded classrooms containing 40 or even 50 pupils are common. Almost three-quarters run on a double-shift system, where two separate groups of pupils and teachers share the same buildings, thus reducing teaching time. The school year is often interrupted by conflicts, prompting UNRWA to develop a special programme that provides education in emergency situations.

Per the longstanding agreement, UNRWA schools follow the curriculum of their host countries. This allows UNRWA pupils to progress to further education or employment holding locally recognised qualifications and complies with the sovereignty requirements of countries hosting refugees. Wherever possible, UNRWA students take national exams conducted by the host governments.

=== Relief and social services programme ===
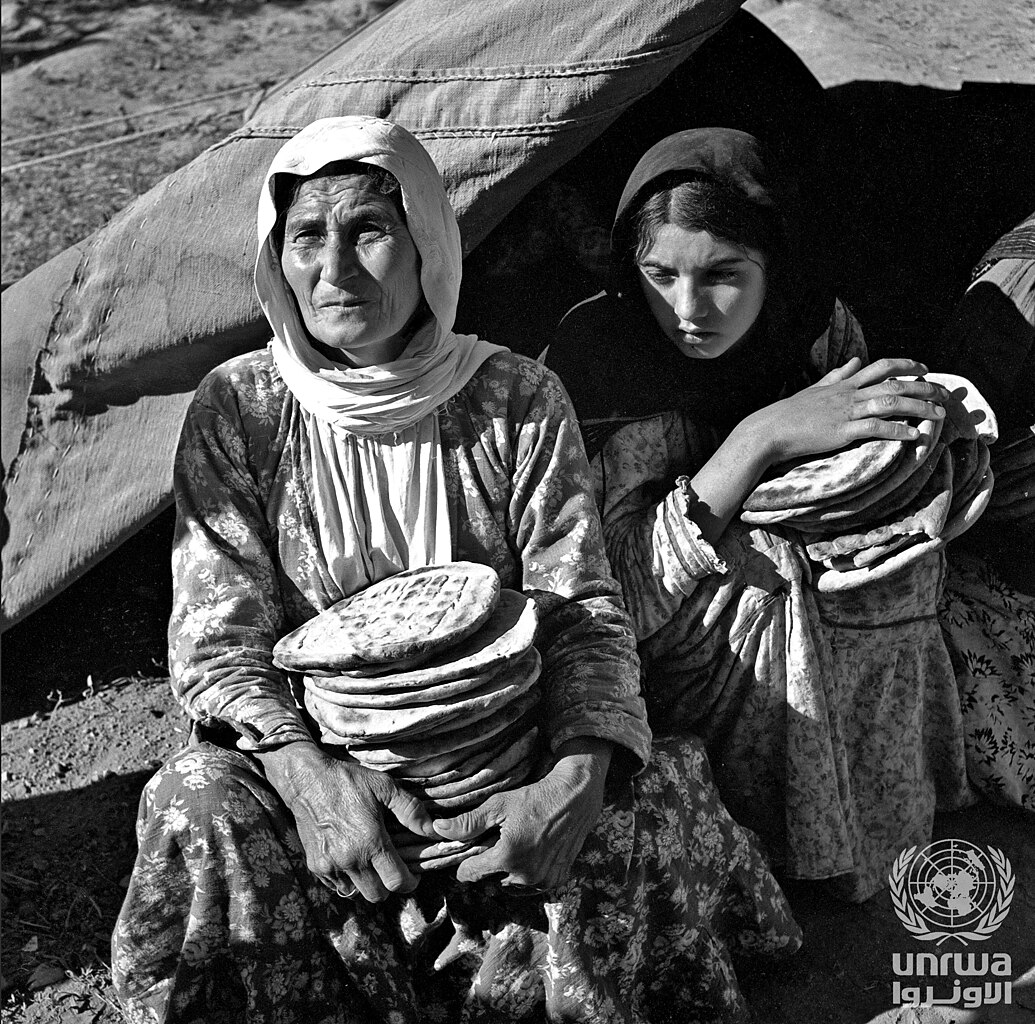
Women receiving bread from United Nations Relief for Palestine Refugees (UNRPR), 1948: photo from UNRWA Archive

UNRWA provides food aid, cash assistance, and help with shelter repairs to these families. In addition, children from special hardship case families are given preferential access to the Agency's vocational training centres, while women in such families are encouraged to join UNRWA's women's programme centres. In these centres, training, advice, and childcare are available to encourage female refugees' social development. In Palestinian refugee society, families without a male head of household are often vulnerable. Those headed by a widow, a divorcee, or a disabled father often live in dire poverty. These families are considered "hardship cases" and constitute less than 6% of UNRWA beneficiaries.

UNRWA has created community-based organizations (CBOs) to target women, refugees with disabilities, and to look after the needs of children. The CBOs now have their own management committees staffed by volunteers from the community. UNRWA provides them with technical and small sums of targeted financial assistance, but many have formed links of their own with local and international NGOs.

=== Health program ===
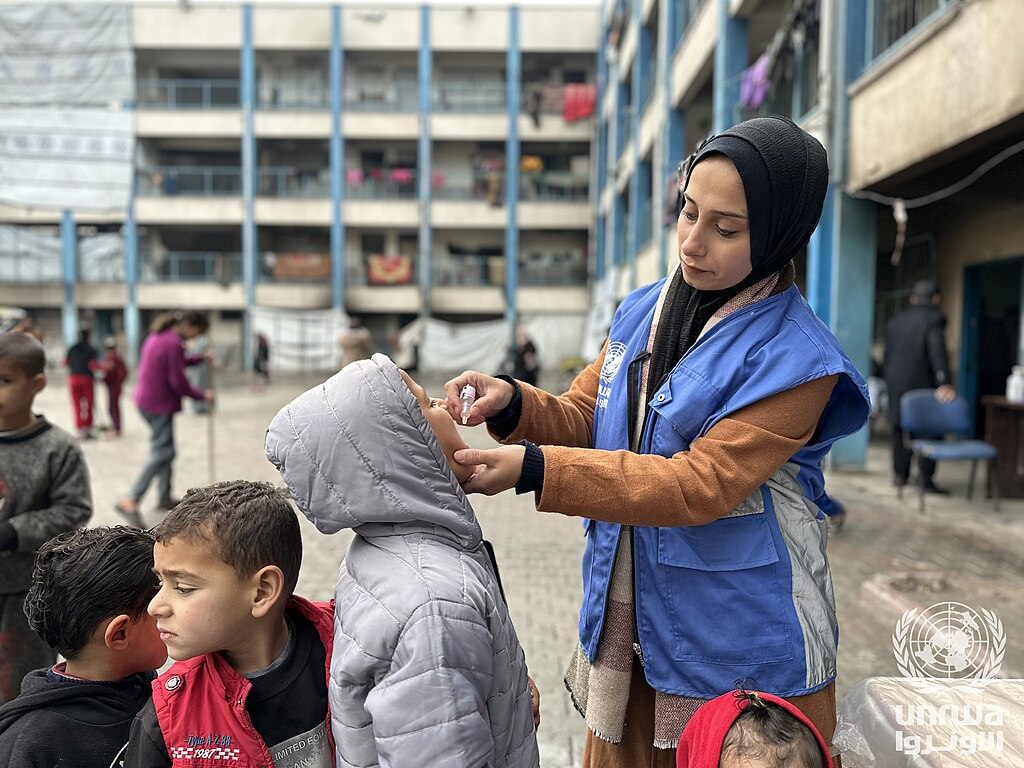
Polio vaccines being administered at an UNRWA shelter in Al-Shati refugee camp during the 2024–25 Gaza Strip polio epidemic

Since 1950, UNRWA has been the main healthcare provider for Palestinian refugees. Basic health needs are met through a network of primary care clinics, providing access to secondary treatment in hospitals, food aid to vulnerable groups, and environmental health in refugee camps.

Key figures for 2014 are:

- 139 primary health facilities based in or near UNRWA settlements/camps
- 3,107 health staff
- 3,134,732 refugees accessing health services
- 9,290,197 annual patient visits

The health of Palestine refugees has long resembled that of many populations in the transition from developing world to developed world status. However, there is now a demographic transition.

People are living longer and developing different needs, particularly those related to non-communicable diseases (NCDs) and chronic conditions that require lifelong care, such as diabetes, hypertension, and cancer. A healthy life is a continuum of phases from infancy to old age, each of which has unique, specific needs, and our programme therefore takes a 'life-cycle approach' to providing its package of preventive and curative health services. To address the changing needs of Palestine refugees, we undertook a major reform initiative in 2011. We introduced the Family Health Team (FHT) approach, based on the World Health Organization-indicated values of primary health care, in our primary health facilities (PHFs).

Medical services include outpatient care, dental treatment, and rehabilitation for the physically disabled. Maternal and child healthcare is a priority for UNRWA's health program. School health teams and camp medical officers visit UNRWA schools to examine new pupils to aid early detection of childhood diseases. All UNRWA clinics offer family planning services with counselling that emphasises the importance of birth spacing as a factor in maternal and child health. Agency clinics also supervise the provision of food aid to nursing and pregnant mothers who need it, and six clinics in the Gaza Strip have their own maternity units. Infant mortality rates have for some time been lower among refugees than the World Health Organization's benchmark for the developing world.

UNRWA provides refugees with assistance in meeting the costs of hospitalisation either by partially reimbursing them, or by negotiating contracts with government, NGOs, and private hospitals. UNRWA's environmental health services program "controls the quality of drinking water, provides sanitation, and carries out vector and rodent control in refugee camps, thus reducing the risk of epidemics."

=== Microfinance Department ===
UNRWA's Microfinance Department (MD) aims to alleviate poverty and support economic development in the refugee community by providing capital investment and working capital loans at commercial rates. The programme seeks to be as close to self-supporting as possible. It has a strong record of creating employment, generating income, and empowering refugees.

The MD is an autonomous financial unit within UNRWA, established in 1991 to provide microfinance services to Palestine refugees, as well as poor or marginal groups living and working in close proximity to them. With operations in three countries, the MD currently has the broadest regional coverage of any microfinance institution in the Middle East. Having begun its operations in the Palestinian territories, it remains the largest non-bank financial intermediary in the West Bank and Gaza.

Key figures, cumulative as of 2023 are:

- 29,000 number of loans awarded
- US$531.41 million value of loans awarded
- 25% youth outreach
- 48% women outreach

=== Emergency operations ===
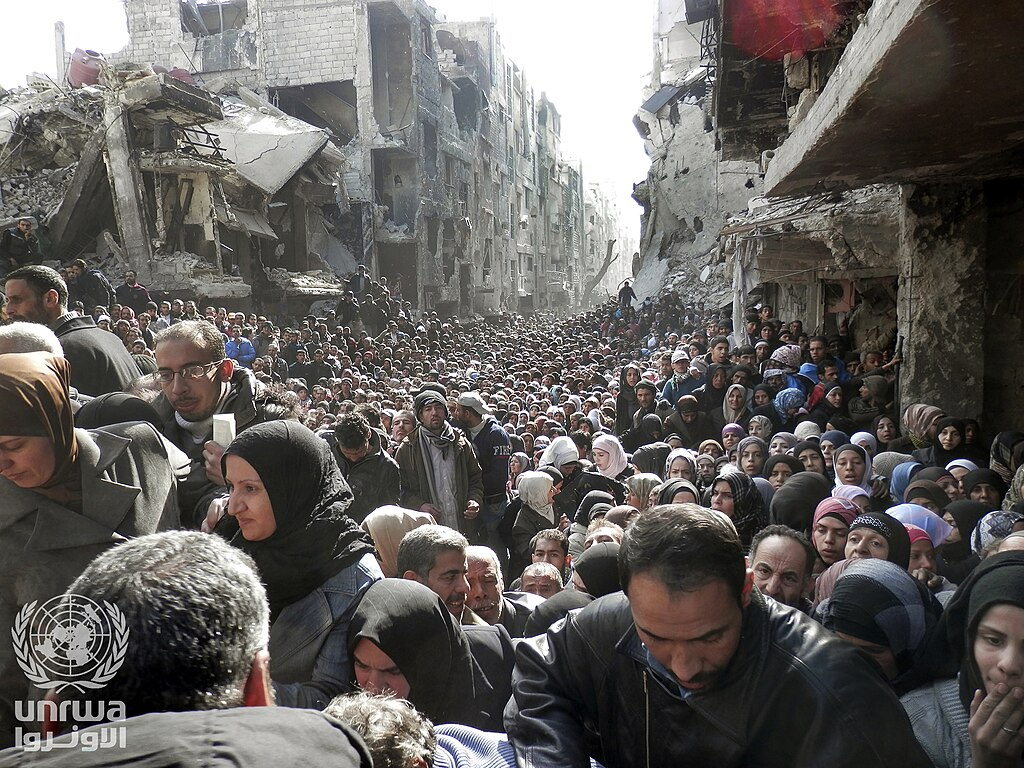
Residents of Yarmouk Camp line up to receive UNRWA aid during the Syrian civil war, January 2014

UNRWA takes a wide variety of actions to mitigate the effects of emergencies on the lives of Palestine refugees. Particularly in the West Bank and the Gaza Strip (occupied Palestinian territory) there has been ongoing intervention made necessary by, e.g., the 1967 War as well as the first and second intifadas, and the 2014 Gaza War. The reconstruction work at Nahr el-Bared Palestine refugee camp in Lebanon has been the largest reconstruction project ever undertaken by UNRWA. This work began in 2009 and was made necessary when the camp was destroyed in the fighting between the Lebanese Armed Forces and Fatah al-Islam in 2007.

Services range from supplying temporary shelter, water, food, clothing, and blankets to temporary job-creation and help for rebuilding. There is extensive cooperation with other international NGOs and local actors.

=== Infrastructure and camp/settlement improvement ===
As of 2023, there are 58 official refugee camps for Palestinians, of which nine are undergoing active improvement. 6 million refugees were registered with UNRWA, with 1.37 million in Gaza using a UNRWA camp. The camps are neither owned nor administered by the Agency; host governments are responsible for allocating land (mostly of which is privately owned) and providing security and order. Rather, UNRWA is responsible for operating education, health, relief and social services, microfinance, and emergency assistance programmes, some of which may be located outside the camps.

However, as the camps have gradually transformed from temporary "tent" cities to semi-permanent and dense urban environments, UNRWA has characterized them as "hyper-congested" and "overcrowded" with "critically substandard and in many cases life-threatening" infrastructure. In response, in 2007 the Agency launched the Infrastructure and Camp Improvement Programme (ICIP) to improve spatial and environmental conditions through comprehensive urban planning methods and community engagement. ICIP is implemented differently in each host country based on local needs, resources, and priorities, albeit with a broader focus on rehabilitating or reconstructing existing shelters, building new housing or service centers, providing maintenance, and improving public infrastructure such as sanitation and water drainage.

Following the destruction of much of the Nahr al-Bared refugee camp in northern Lebanon in 2007, resulting from months of fighting between Fatah al-Islam militants and the Lebanese Armed Forces, UNRWA led the initiative to rebuild the camp, in what has become the largest project in its history. As of April 2021, nearly two-thirds (72 percent) of the camp has been reconstructed, including 386 shops and businesses, enabling 3,550 families to return. Special funding has been provided by Saudi Arabia, Japan, the Netherlands, and the United Arab Emirates.

=== Photo and film archives ===
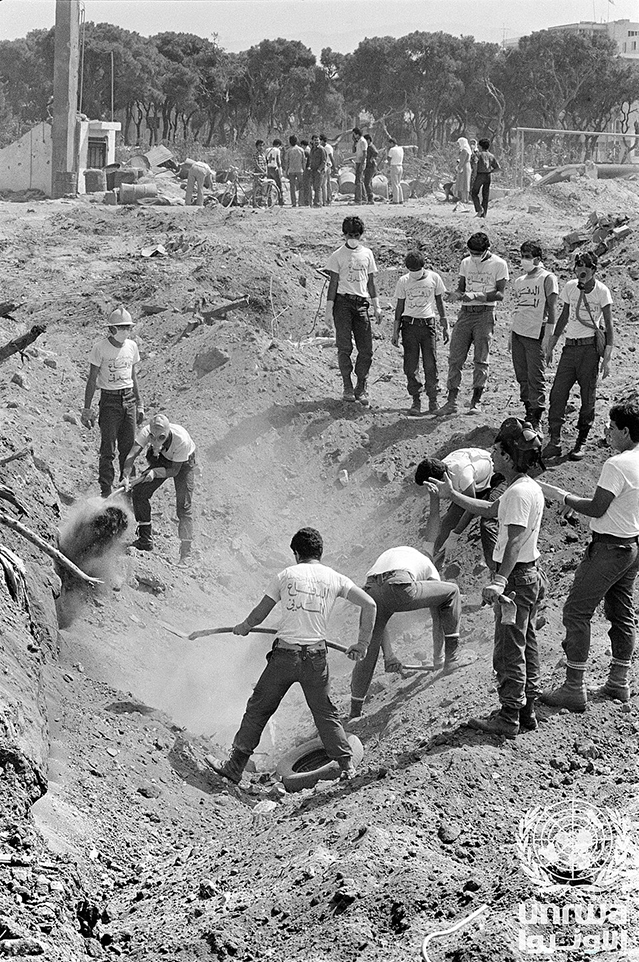
Men dig a mass grave for victims of the Sabra and Shatila massacre, 1982, from the UNRWA Archive.

Throughout its history, UNRWA has collected photographs and film to document the lives of refugees as well as relief efforts. These materials are produced by UNRWA staff or by external contractors, including photographers working for other UN agencies. An initial batch of photographs were provided by staff of the Red Cross, covering a period before UNRWA was active. As of 2008, the collection had grown to around 10,000 photographs, 400,000 negatives, 15,000 colour slides, 75 films, and 400 videotapes. These are stored in UNRWA facilities in Gaza and Amman. The images and films come from the five areas where the agency is active: Gaza, Jerusalem, the West Bank, Lebanon, and Syria. In 2009, UNESCO added this collection to its Memory of the World International Register, recognising it as documentary heritage of global importance. In 2012, UNRWA began digitising this archive and making images available online.

== Assessment ==
UNRWA has received praise from Nobel Peace laureates Mairéad Corrigan Maguire and Kofi Annan, the president of the UN General Assembly, former UN Secretary-General Ban Ki-moon, and representatives from the European Union, the United States, the Netherlands, Japan, Bangladesh, Cyprus, Jordan, Ghana, and Norway, among others. In 2007, the permanent representative of Norway to the United Nations described his country as a "strong supporter" of UNRWA, which acts as "a safety net" for the Palestine refugees, providing them with "immediate relief, basic services and the possibility of a life in dignity". The same day, the representative of Iceland praised the agency's ability to "deliver substantial results" despite "often life-threatening conditions".

In 2007, Israel expressed its continued support for UNRWA, noting that despite "concerns regarding the politicization" of the agency, the country supports its humanitarian mission.

On 17 January 2024, US State Department spokesperson Matthew Miller rejected calls to defund UNRWA, saying:

UNRWA has done and continues to do invaluable work to address the humanitarian situation in Gaza at great personal risk to UNRWA members. I believe it’s over 100 UNRWA staff members have been killed doing this lifesaving work, and we continue to not only support it but we continue to commend them for the really heroic efforts that they make oftentimes while making the greatest sacrifice.

=== Independent evaluations ===
In 2011, UNRWA agreed to be assessed by the Multilateral Organisation Performance Assessment Network (MOPAN), a network of donor countries established to determine the organisational effectiveness of multilateral organisations. Based on four dimensions of organisational effectiveness—strategic management, operational management, relationship management, and knowledge management—MOPAN concluded that the agency performs adequately or well in most key indicators, particularly within strategic management. UNRWA responded to the result positively, noting that "many of the challenges highlighted in the report reflect challenges within most, if not all, multilateral organisations." In its most recent assessment in 2019, MOPAN commended UNRWA for continuing to increase the efficiency of its programmes, recognizing the agency as "competent, resilient and resolute".

== Criticism and issues ==
In 2004, Emanuel Marx and Nitza Nachmias pointed out that many criticisms of the agency corresponded to its age, "including symptoms of inflexibility, resistance to adjust to the changing political environment, and refusal to phase out and transfer its responsibilities to the Palestinian Authority".

In 2007, UNRWA initiated a reform program to improve efficiency. However, an internal ethics report leaked to Al Jazeera in 2019 alleged that, since 2015, the agency's senior management have consolidated power at the expense of efficiency, leading to widespread misconduct, nepotism, and other abuses of power among high ranking personnel. Responding to the Al Jazeera report, UNRWA issued a statement that both internal and external assessments of its management have been "positive":

A recent report by an external group of experts (MOPAN) [Multilateral Organisation Performance Assessment Network] has just shown satisfactory (and at times very satisfactory) results of UNRWA's management and impact - which is particularly important for us during these times of intense political and financial pressure on the agency ... Similarly, the United Nations Board of Auditors recognized the quality of the management and leadership of UNRWA. Finally, the 2018 annual report recently presented by UNRWA's Department of Internal Oversight Services and Ethics Division - both independent bodies - to UNRWA's Advisory Commission (host countries and largest donors) confirmed these positive assessments. These reports testify to the strength of this Agency and are a matter of public record.

=== Mandate ===
Some critics of UNRWA have argued that it serves to perpetuate the conflict. Although UNRWA's mandate is only for relief works, The Wall Street Journal Europe, published an op-ed by Asaf Romirowsky and Alexander H. Joffe in April 2011 saying that "it is hard to claim that the UNRWA has created any Palestinian institutions that foster genuinely civil society. Ideally, the UNRWA would be disbanded and Palestinians given the freedom – and the responsibility – to build their own society."

The UNHCR is mandated to help refugees get on with their lives as quickly as possible and works to settle them rapidly, most frequently in countries other than those they fled. UNRWA policy, however, states that the Palestinian Arabs who fled from Israel in the course of the 1948 war, plus all of their descendants, are to be considered refugees until political actors can find a just and durable solution. UNRWA was specifically designed not to prescribe how the outcome of an agreement would take shape.

James G. Lindsay, a former UNRWA general counsel and fellow researcher for Washington Institute for Near East Policy, published a report for in 2009 in which he criticized UNRWA practices. One of his conclusions was that UNRWA's failure to match the UNHCR's success in resettling refugees "obviously represents a political decision on the part of the agency" and "seems to favor the strain of Palestinian political thought espoused by those who are intent on a 'return' to the land that is now Israel".

=== Operations ===
==== Protection of Palestinian refugees ====
Asem Khalil, Associate Professor of Law at Birzeit University and dean of the Faculty of Law and Public Administration, has focused on human rights issues for Palestinians in host countries. After systematically documenting the human rights situation for Palestinians in Egypt, Jordan, Lebanon, and Syria, he concludes:

The point this approach is stresses, I believe, is not that UNRWA is not necessary or that Palestinian refugeehood is not unique and special, but rather that UNRWA is not currently capable of ensuring necessary protection for Palestinian refugees, and that host Arab states cannot use the uniqueness of Palestinian refugeehood to continue upholding discriminatory laws and policies towards Palestinian refugees. ...

The global financial crisis may result in decreasing international funds to UNRWA, and UNRWA may be pushed towards reducing its services. Such a scenario will be felt by Palestinian refugees in particular ways, seeing the absence of alternative sources of income and the restrictive laws and policies that exist in some host countries. UNRWA is a main service provider for Palestinian refugees in host countries. It provides jobs for thousands of refugees, education, health care, and various other services that are extremely valuable and necessary.

... The issue at stake here is that UNRWA is not enough, but the alternative is not the replacement of UNRWA by UNHCR, rather the enhancement of the protection role of UNRWA, or the extension of protection mandate of UNHCR to Palestinian refugees besides (not instead) existing agencies dealing with Palestinian refugees ...

==== Textbook issues ====
In 2005, Nathan Brown, Professor of Political Science at George Washington University, reviewed textbooks used by Palestinians, focusing especially on changes that began in 1994.

The Oslo agreements resulted in the dismantling of the Israeli office responsible for censorship of textbooks. Administration of the education system for all Palestinian students in the West Bank and Gaza was taken over by the Palestinian Authority. Other Palestinian schools administered by UNRWA in neighboring countries were unaffected. With the end of UNESCO monitoring of the books, UNRWA moved to develop supplementary materials to teach tolerance in the schools it administered.

It is the PA textbooks used in UNRWA schools in the West Bank, Gaza, and East Jerusalem that have been most extensively studied. In the beginning, the PA used books from Jordan and Egypt. In 2000 it started issuing its own books. Brown has pointed out that research into Palestinian textbooks conducted by the Centre for Monitoring the Impact of Peace in 1998 is misleading because it evaluates the old books; and in 2000, its research mixed old and new books. Brown investigated the differences between the new PA books and the ones being replaced.

Regarding the Palestinian Authority's new textbooks, he states:

The new books have removed the anti-Semitism present in the older books while they tell history from a Palestinian point of view, they do not seek to erase Israel, delegitimize, it or replace it with the "State of Palestine"; each book contains a foreword describing the West Bank and Gaza as "the two parts of the homeland"; the maps show some awkwardness but do sometimes indicate the 1967 line and take some other measures to avoid indicating borders; in this respect they are actually more forthcoming than Israeli maps; the books avoid treating Israel at length but do indeed mention it by name; the new books must be seen as a tremendous improvement from a Jewish, Israeli, and humanitarian view; they do not compare unfavorably to the material my son was given as a fourth-grade student in a school in Tel Aviv".

In 2002, the United States Congress requested that the United States Department of State commission a reputable NGO to review the new Palestinian curriculum. The Israel/Palestine Center for Research and Information (IPCRI) was thereby commissioned by the US Embassy in Tel Aviv and the US Consul General in Jerusalem to review the textbooks. Its report was completed in March 2003 and delivered to the State Department for submission to Congress. Its executive summary states: "The overall orientation of the curriculum is peaceful despite the harsh and violent realities on the ground. It does not openly incite against Israel and the Jews. It does not openly incite hatred and violence. Religious and political tolerance is emphasized in a good number of textbooks and in multiple contexts."

IPCRI's June 2004 follow-up report notes that "except for calls for resisting occupation and oppression, no signs were detected of outright promotion of hatred towards Israel, Judaism, or Zionism" and that "tolerance, as a concept, runs across the new textbooks". The report also stated that "textbooks revealed numerous instances that introduce and promote the universal and religious values and concepts of respect for other cultures, religions, and ethnic groups, peace, human rights, freedom of speech, justice, compassion, diversity, plurality, tolerance, respect of law, and environmental awareness".

However, the IPCRI noted a number of deficiencies in the curriculum.

The practice of 'appropriating' sites, areas, localities, geographic regions, etc. inside the territory of the State of Israel as Palestine/Palestinian observed in our previous review, remains a feature of the newly published textbooks (4th and 9th Grade) laying substantive grounds to the contention that the Palestinian Authority did not in fact recognize Israel as the State of the Jewish people. ...

The summary also states that the curriculum asserts a historical Arab presence in the region, while:

The Jewish connection to the region, in general, and the Holy Land, in particular, is virtually missing. This lack of reference is perceived as tantamount to a denial of such a connection, although no direct evidence is found for such a denial." It also notes that "terms and passages used to describe some historical events are sometimes offensive in nature and could be construed as reflecting hatred of and discrimination against Jews and Judaism."

The US State Department has similarly raised concerns about the content of textbooks used in PA schools. In its 2009 Human Rights report, the US Department of State wrote that after a 2006 revision of textbooks by the PA Ministry of Education and Higher Education, international academics concluded that books did not incite violence against Jews but showed imbalance, bias, and inaccuracy. The examples given were similar to those given by IPCRI.

In 2013, the results of a rigorous study that also compared Israeli and PA textbooks were released. The study was launched by the Council for Religious Institutions in the Holy Land, an interfaith association of Jewish, Christian, and Muslim leaders in Israel and the Occupied Territories. The study was overseen by an international Scientific Advisory Panel and funded by the US State Department The Council published a report "Victims of Our Own Narratives? Portrayal of the 'Other' in Israeli and Palestinian School Books". Most books were found to be factually accurate except, for example, in presenting maps that present the area from the river to the sea as either Palestine or Israel. Israeli schoolbooks were deemed superior to Palestinian ones with regard to preparing children for peace. However, various depictions of the "other" as enemy occurred in 75% of Israeli, and in 81% of Palestinian textbooks. The study praised both Israel and the Palestinian Authority for producing textbooks almost completely unblemished by "dehumanizing and demonizing characterizations of the other". Yet many troubling examples were given of both sides failing to represent each other in a positive or even adequate way. And the problem was more pronounced in PA textbooks.

- Neutral depictions of "the other" were found in 4% of Israeli and 15% of Palestinian textbooks.
- Overall negative or very negative representations of Palestinians occurred 49% of the time in Israeli state school books (73% in Haredi school books) and in 84% of Palestinian textbooks.
- Highly negative characterizations were discerned in 26% of Israeli state school books and 50% of the Palestinian ones.

In response to a critical report written in 2009 by former UNRWA general counsel James G. Lindsay, fellow researcher for Washington Institute for Near East Policy John Ging, head of UNRWA Gaza, said: "As for our schools, we use textbooks of the Palestinian Authority. Are they perfect? No, they're not. I can't defend the indefensible."

UNRWA has taken many steps since 2000 to supplement the PA curriculum with concepts of human rights, nonviolent conflict resolution, and tolerance. According to the UNRWA website:

We have been delivering human rights education in our schools since 2000 to promote non-violence, healthy communication skills, peaceful conflict resolution, human rights, tolerance, and good citizenship. In May 2012, the Agency endorsed its new Human Rights, Conflict Resolution and Tolerance (HRCRT) Policy to further strengthen human rights education in UNRWA. This policy builds upon past successes, but also draws from international best practices and paves the way to better integrate human rights education in all our schools. The HRCRT Policy reflects the UNRWA mandate of quality education for Palestine refugees and sets out a common approach among all UNRWA schools for the teaching and learning of human rights, conflict resolution and tolerance. The vision of the policy is to "provide human rights education that empowers Palestine refugee students to enjoy and exercise their rights, uphold human rights values, be proud of their Palestinian identity, and contribute positively to their society and the global community."

In 2021, the Australian and Canadian governments started investigating UNRWA, and the British government found that UNRWA had produced and disseminated textbooks inciting violence. UNRWA blocked public access to its website content in response. Phillipe Lazzarini admitted to the European Parliament that the study materials in UNRWA's schools featured incitement to violence, glorification of acts of terror, and antisemitism, but insisted that the agency takes steps to prevent the material from being taught.

A review performed in 2024 names using "host-country textbooks with problematic content" as one of the issues with UNRWA's neutrality. The review states "Three international assessments of PA textbooks in recent years have provided a nuanced picture,..Two identified presence of bias and antagonistic content, but did not provide evidence of antisemitic content. The third assessment, by the [German-based] Georg Eckert Institute, studied 156 PA textbooks and identified two examples that it found to display antisemitic motifs but noted that one of them had already been removed, the other has been altered."

==== Relationship with Hamas ====
In October 2004, UNRWA Commissioner-General Peter Hansen caused controversy in Canada when he said in an interview with CBC TV:

Oh I am sure that there are Hamas members on the UNRWA payroll and I don't see that as a crime. Hamas as a political organization does not mean that every member is a militant and we do not do political vetting and exclude people from one persuasion as against another. We demand of our staff, whatever their political persuasion is, that they behave in accordance with UN standards and norms for neutrality.

Hansen later specified that he had been referring not to active Hamas members, but to Hamas sympathizers within UNRWA. In a letter to the Agency's major donors, he said he was attempting to be honest because UNRWA has over 8,200 employees in the Gaza Strip. Given that opinion polls show 30% support of Hamas in Gaza at the time, and UNRWA's workforce of 11,000 Palestinians, at least some Hamas sympathizers were likely to be among UNRWA's employees. The important thing, he wrote, was that UNRWA's strict rules and regulations ensured that its staff remained impartial UN servants. Hansen was retired from United Nations service against his will on 31 March 2005 after the United States blocked his reappointment.

UNRWA has come under criticism from Hamas for teaching Palestinian students Western values. According to Hazem Balousha, some Hamas officials objected to UNRWA-organized trips for Palestinian students to visit Holocaust remembrance sites. Hamas officials also opposed other UNRWA organized trips for Palestinian students to the US and Europe. According to The Guardian, Hamas has in some cases threatened UN staff in Gaza. James G. Lindsay, a former UNRWA general counsel and affiliated with the pro-Israel Washington Institute for Near East Policy published a report for WINEP in 2009 in which he said UNRWA did not take enough steps to detect and prevent members of Hamas from joining the organization.

According to The Jerusalem Post, Hamas won a teachers union election for UN schools in Gaza in 2009. UNRWA has strongly denied this and pointed out that "Staff elections are conducted on an individual – not party list – basis for unions that handle normal labour relations – not political – issues." In addition, John Ging, the Gaza head of operations, said in a letter dated 29 March 2009 that employees must not "be under the influence of any political party in the conduct of their work."

Israeli newspaper Yedioth Ahronoth stated in 2012 that a staff union election resulted in 25 of the 27 seats going to Palestinians who were either Islamist or sympathetic towards Hamas. More than 9,500 UNRWA employees in the Gaza Strip participated, representing more than 80% turnout. The professional list won three UNRWA workers' groups: the employees', teachers', and services' unions. According to the Israeli government, UNRWA employed at least 24 members of Hamas or Islamic Jihad in 24 of its schools; the majority were principals or deputy principals, and several were fighters in the Qassam Brigades. Also, Israel provided intelligence about 18 UNRWA workers it accused of participating in the 7 October 2023, attacks. In April 2024, following a withdrawal of funding to UNRWA, NPR said that an independent inquiry found "no evidence for Israel's claims" regarding the relationship between the aid agency and Hamas.

On 30 September 2024, UNRWA confirmed that Fatah Sharif, a top Hamas commander killed in an Israeli airstrike in Lebanon, had formerly been on its payroll as a school principal and head of the teachers' union in Lebanon. UNRWA said it had suspended Sharif and started an investigation in March when it learned of the allegation that Sharif was a member of the political wing of Hamas. It was not aware that he was a Hamas commander. Hamas praised him posthumously for his "educational and jihadist work." In February 2025, former hostage Emily Damari alleged she was held in a UNRWA facility for some of her 15-month captivity by Hamas. UNRWA said there were times when it lacked access to its facilities, and that most were converted into shelters. It called for an independent investigation into the misuse of its facilities.

A United States oversight body in 2026 stated that more than 100 UNRWA staffers were affiliated with Hamas’s military wing and had participated in the October 7 attacks. The U.S. Agency for International Development inspector general’s office said these workers included educators, security personnel and medical professionals.

==== Hamas interference ====
It has been reported that Hamas has interfered with curriculum and textbooks in UNRWA schools. For example, in 2009 it caused UNRWA to suspend a decision to introduce Holocaust studies in its schools. One of UNRWA's flagships has been gender-equality and integration. But Hamas militants have firebombed UNRWA mixed-gender summer camps, and in 2013 Hamas passed a law requiring gender segregation in schools for all pupils nine years of age and older in Gaza. The law does not apply to UNRWA schools.

Elhanen Miller, the Arab affairs reporter for The Times of Israel, wrote in February 2014 that Hamas was "bashing" UNRWA's human rights curriculum, saying that it included too many examples and values foreign to Palestinian culture and had too much emphasis on peaceful resistance rather than armed resistance. In this case, UNRWA refused to be swayed. Spokesman Chris Gunness said:

UNRWA has no plans to change its education programs in Gaza ... human rights are taught in all UNRWA schools from grades 1 through 9, discussing the Universal Declaration of Human Rights.

UNRWA's education system takes as its basis the curriculum taught by the PA and so we use PA textbooks in preparing children in Gaza for public examinations. ... In addition, we enrich our education programs in Gaza with an agreed human rights curriculum which has been developed with the communities we serve: with educationalists, parents groups, teachers associations, staff members and others. We have done our utmost in developing these materials to be sensitive to local values while also being true to the universal values that underpin the work of the United Nations.

However, after a few days, UNRWA consented to temporarily suspend the use of only the books for grades 7–9 (continuing to use those for grades 1–6) pending further discussions.

==== Operation of summer camps ====
Hamas has denounced UNRWA and Ging, accusing them of using their summer camps to corrupt the morals of Palestinian youth. Hamas also advised UNRWA to re-examine its curriculum to ensure its suitability for Palestinian society, due to the mixing of genders at the camps. In September 2011, it was reported that, under pressure from Hamas, UNRWA had made all its summer camps single-sex. Hamas has its own network of summer camps and the two organizations are regarded as vying for influence with Gazan youth. Islamic Jihad has also run summer camps since 2013. UNRWA did not operate its summer camps for summer 2012 and summer 2014 due to a lack of available funding. Hamas has filled this void and is now the direct provider of summer activities for about 100,000 children and youths. In 2013, UNRWA canceled its planned marathon in Gaza after the Gaza government prohibited women from participating in the race.

In 2013, Israeli media outlets aired a video documenting UNRWA-funded summer camps where children are being taught to engage in violence against Israelis. The video airs speakers telling campers, "With God's help and our own strength we will wage war. And with education and Jihad we will return to our homes!" A student is also shown on camera describing that "the summer camp teaches us that we have to liberate Palestine." UNRWA denies that the video shows UNRWA summer camps and instead shows footage of camps that were not operated by UNRWA, and stated that the film was "grossly misleading" and that "the film-maker concerned has a history of making baseless claims about UNRWA, all of which we have investigated and demonstrated to be patently false." It stated that the 'summer camp' shown in the West Bank was not affiliated with or organized by UNRWA, and that footage from the camp in Gaza "revealed that absolutely nothing anti-Semitic or inflammatory was done or said".

==== Sexual violence ====
In September 2025, AP News reported that women in Gaza during the Gaza War were being exploited by local men, including those affiliated with UNRWA, who promised them aid or employment in exchange for sexual favours. Six women spoke to AP on condition of anonymity, fearing retaliation from the men or their own families in a culture where sexual harassment is taboo. One of them, a 35-year old widow, said an UNRWA linked worker took her phone number while she sought aid, then made nightly calls asking sexual questions and requesting she come to him for sex, then her aid stopped when she refused. She said she gave a verbal complaint to UNRWA but was told she needed evidence, a requirement that contradicts the agency's stated zero proof required policy.

UNRWA communications director Juliette Touma told AP that the agency maintains a zero tolerance policy on sexual exploitation and does not require survivors to provide proof, but declined to say whether staff were aware of the specific complaint. The Protection from Sexual Exploitation and Abuse network (PSEA), of which UNRWA is a member, said it received 18 allegations of sexual abuse and exploitation tied to humanitarian aid access in Gaza in 2024. The AP findings followed a June 2024 report by the Global Protection Cluster, a Geneva-based coalition of NGOs and UN agencies, which had already documented allegations of sexual abuse, trafficking, and forced prostitution by aid workers in Gaza.

== Investigations and calls for accountability and reform ==
Many critics of UNRWA, while generally recognizing the importance of its work and the infeasibility of disbanding it, believe it requires more transparency, oversight, and support. Writing in the Middle East Monitor in April 2012, Karen Koning AbuZayd, a former Commissioner-General of the UNRWA (2005–2009), argued that "UNRWA needs support not brickbats". She concluded that:

... even those who scrutinise [UNRWA] most closely and challenge it most severely are those who also ensure that its programmes receive adequate funding. They, like others who view the agency more positively, realise that UNRWA makes a major contribution to stability in the Middle East.

Writing in the Times of Israel on 31 July 2014, David Horovitz said that Israel's complaints against UNRWA included that its definition of "refugee" included the descendants of the original Palestinian refugees, that it was "closely watched by Hamas for signs that it is not sufficiently critical of Israel", and that stockpiles of rockets had been found in its school. He wrote that Israel wanted UNRWA abolished but believed that no one would take over the agency's duties, including administering the more than 200,000 Gazans internally displaced during the then-ongoing 2014 Gaza War. He said that, as a result, Israel had never "launched a no-holds-barred effort to bring UNRWA down". In a January 2025 piece titled "Gaza after UNRWA", Horovitz listed alleged ties between UNRWA and Hamas, including allegations of its staff's "complicity in the mass murder in Israel that caused the war and devastation in Gaza". Horovitz also criticised the agency for having "perpetuated a fundamental intolerance for the simple fact of Israel’s existence" and having "helped Hamas and by extension doomed Gaza".

=== Repeated calls for investigation by the United States ===
The United States government financed a programme of "Operations Support Officers" whose responsibilities including undertaking random and unannounced inspections of UNRWA facilities to ensure their sanctity from militant operations. In 2004, the U.S. Congress asked the General Accounting Office (GAO) to investigate media claims that government funding given to UNRWA had been used to support individuals involved in militant activities. During its investigation, the GAO discovered several irregularities in its processing and employment history.

In August 2014, several US Senators demanded an impartial investigation into UNRWA's alleged participation in the 2014 Gaza-Israel conflict, accusing UNRWA of being complicit with Hamas.

... While the letter does not call on the State Department to cut aid, the senators write that the American taxpayers "deserve to know if UNRWA is fulfilling its mission or taking sides in this tragic conflict."

... Responding to the letter, a State Department spokesman said that the UN is taking "proactive steps to address this problem," including deploying munitions experts to the strip in search of more weapons caches. "The international community cannot accept a situation where the United Nations – its facilities, staff, and those it is protecting – are used as shields for militants and terrorist groups," State Department spokesone Edgar Vasquez told The Jerusalem Post. "We remain in intensive consultations with UN leadership about the UN's response." ...

"There are few good solutions given the exceptionally difficult situation in Gaza," Vasquez continued, "but nonetheless we are in contact with the United Nations, other UNRWA donors, and concerned parties – including Israel – on identifying better options for protecting the neutrality of UN facilities and ensuring that weapons discovered are handled appropriately and do not find their way back to Hamas or other terrorist groups."

In 2018, citing a "failure to mobilize adequate and appropriate burden sharing," the Trump administration stopped funding UNRWA, calling its fundamental business model and fiscal practices "simply unsustainable". Secretary of State Mike Pompeo maintained that "most Palestinians under UNRWA's jurisdiction aren't refugees, and UNRWA is a hurdle to peace." The Biden administration restarted funding in April 2021 and as of 2024 provided almost $1 billion to UNRWA. In 2024, during the Gaza war, the Biden administration halted funding for UNRWA after the Israeli government alleged that some UNRWA staffers took part in the October 7 attacks.

=== James G. Lindsay ===
On the basis of his 2009 analyses for WINEP, referred to in previous sections, former UNRWA general-counsel James G. Lindsay and fellow researcher for Washington Institute for Near East Policy made the following suggestions for improvement:

UNRWA should make the following operational changes: halt its one-sided political statements and limit itself to comments on humanitarian issues; take additional steps to ensure the agency is not employing or providing benefits to terrorists and criminals; and allow the UN Educational, Scientific and Cultural Organization (UNESCO), or some other neutral entity, to provide balanced and discrimination-free textbooks for UNRWA schools.

Andrew Whitley, director of the UNRWA representative office at UN headquarters in New York, criticized the report as biased and relying on limited sources. Additionally, he noted: "Someone reading this paper with no background would assume that the Israeli government was a benign actor. No mention is made of the occupation of the West Bank and the Gaza Strip."

UNRWA's Jerusalem spokesperson Chris Gunness stated that UNRWA rejects Lindsay's report and its findings and said that the study was inaccurate and misleading, since it "makes selective use of source material and fails to paint a truthful portrait of UNRWA and its operations today".

In response to the criticism of his report from UNRWA, Lindsay writes:

Despite repeated requests from the author, the agency declined to identify the alleged weaknesses on the grounds that "our views—and understanding—of UNRWA's role, the refugees and even U.S. policy are too far apart for us to take time (time that we do not have) to enter into an exchange with little likelihood of influencing a narrative which so substantially differs from our own." Thus, the paper has not benefited from any input by UNRWA, whether a discussion of policy or even correction of alleged errors.

=== Reform initiative ===
An initiative to reform UNRWA was announced by the Center for Near East Policy Research in March 2014. The center carries out research and (through its "Israel Resource News Agency") investigative journalism and research in cooperation with a wide variety of organisations and researchers, such as The Middle East Forum, which has published an entire issue of Middle East Quarterly discussing the challenges facing UNRWA.

The main thrust of the UNRWA Reform Initiative is to present documentation of problems with UNRWA to sponsor nations and organisations with the aim of increasing sponsor demands for accountability. UNRWA has stated on multiple occasions that the head of this initiative, David Bedein, fabricates the information he publishes.

=== EU conditions funding 2021 ===
In September 2021, the European Parliament's Budgetary Control Committee approved withholding 20 million Euros in aid to UNRWA if immediate changes to UNRWA's education curriculum are not made. According to the resolution, the Parliament "is concerned about the hate speech and violence taught in Palestinian school textbooks and used in schools by UNRWA... [and] insists that UNRWA acts in full transparency... to ensure that content adheres to UN values and does not encourage hatred."

Funding for UNRWA was reinstated by the EU on 1 March 2024.

=== 2025 lawsuit ===
In April 2025, the Trump administration's Department of Justice reversed a Biden administration position that UNRWA held immunity from lawsuits in United States courts due to its affiliation with the United Nations. In July 2025, more than 200 plaintiffs sued UNRWA in a Washington, D.C., district court, accusing the organization of violating US anti-terrorism laws by supporting Hamas and Hezbollah. They also accused agency staff of direct involvement in terrorist attacks. UNRWA called the suit "meritless, absurd, dangerous, and morally reprehensible" in a press release.

== Relations with Israel ==
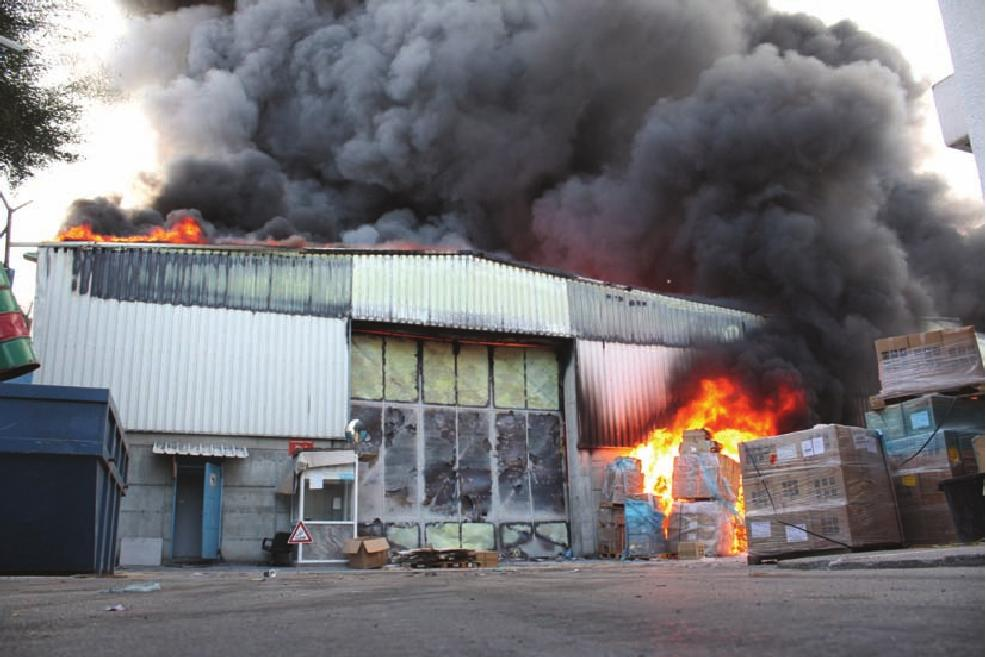
Israeli white phosphorus attack on the main compound of the UNRWA in central Gaza City, 15 January 2009

After Israel captured the West Bank and Gaza in the Six-Day War, it requested that the UNRWA continue its operations there, which it would facilitate. Since then the relationship has been characterized by two-state advocate Baruch Spiegel, as "an uneasy marriage of convenience between two unlikely bedfellows that have helped perpetuate the problem both have allegedly sought to resolve."

Immediately following the Six-Day War, on 14 June UNRWA Commissioner-General Dr. Laurence Michelmore and political advisor to the Israeli Foreign Minister Michael Comay exchanged letters that has since served as much of the basis for the relationship between Israel and UNRWA. Commonly referred to the Comay-Michelmore Exchange of Letters, the initial letter from Michelmore reiterates a verbal conversation between the two, stating that:

at the request of the Israel Government, UNRWA would continue its assistance to the Palestine refugees, with the full co-operation of the Israel authorities, in the West Bank and Gaza Strip areas. For its part, the Israel Government will facilitate the task of UNRWA to the best of its ability, subject only to regulations or arrangements which may be necessitated by considerations of military security.

In his responding letter, Comay wrote:

I agree that your letter and this reply constitute a provisional agreement between UNRWA and the Government of Israel, to remain in force until replaced or cancelled.

UNRWA has been criticised by the Israeli government and politicians for alleged involvement with Palestinian militant groups, such as Hamas. Israeli media organizations have claimed that Peter Hansen, UNRWA's former Commissioner-General (1996–2005) "consistently adopted a trenchant anti-Israel line" which resulted in biased and exaggerated reports against Israel.

=== Israeli ban and ICJ case ===
On 28 October 2024, the Knesset passed legislation that orders UNRWA to cease "any activity" in territories claimed by Israel within 90 days. The Israeli government, for its part, declared that it will terminate all collaboration, communication and contact with UNRWA beginning on 30 January 2025. On 30 January, Israel's UNRWA ban went into effect.

As a result of the ban on UNRWA, the UN General Assembly voted to request an advisory opinion from the International Court of Justice (ICJ) regarding "Obligations of Israel in relation to the Presence and Activities of the United Nations, Other International Organizations and Third States in and in relation to the Occupied Palestinian Territory" in December 2024. Israel’s foreign minister, Gideon Sa'ar, criticized the decision saying that "it is not Israel that should be on trial. It is the UN and Unrwa".

In October 2025, the ICJ issued an advisory opinion finding that Israel's claims that UNRWA had been infiltrated by Hamas were unsubstantiated. The court also ruled that Israel's decision to end cooperation with UNRWA and restrict humanitarian aid to Gaza breached its obligations under the Geneva Conventions and the UN Charter. It furthermore found that Israel's Gaza Humanitarian Foundation was not an adequate substitute, noting that more than 2,100 Palestinians had been killed near its distribution points and that conditions in Gaza had deteriorated to the point that international experts declared a famine in some areas in August. The ICJ further held that the mass transfer or deportation of civilians within occupied territory is prohibited, citing Israeli measures that forced large populations into overcrowded areas and severely restricted UN access. It also ruled that the two Knesset laws ending cooperation with UNRWA in the occupied territories were unlawful, noting that 360 UNRWA staff had been killed during the conflict. The court concluded that Israel, as an occupying power, had unlawfully impeded aid delivery, used starvation as a method of warfare, and failed to respect the immunities of UN personnel and premises. The opinion required Israel to allow UNRWA and other UN agencies to operate freely in the Occupied Palestinian Territories and to permit the International Committee of the Red Cross access to Palestinian prisoners held inside Israel.

In January 2026, Israel demolished the former UNRWA headquarters in East Jerusalem. The demolition followed the implementation of 2024 Knesset legislation that designated UNRWA as a hostile entity, banned its operations within Israeli-controlled territory, and authorized the expropriation of its properties. Previously, UN Secretary-General António Guterres had informed Israeli Prime Minister Benjamin Netanyahu of possible legal proceedings against the latter's government at the International Court of Justice. Israeli authorities justified the action by alleging that UNRWA facilities were being used by militant groups and citing millions of dollars in unpaid property taxes, claims which the agency has repeatedly denied. UNRWA officials condemned the demolition as an "unprecedented attack" on a United Nations body, asserting that the compound was protected by international diplomatic immunity under the 1946 Convention on the Privileges and Immunities of the United Nations. National Security Minister Itamar Ben-Gvir, who personally oversaw the operation, characterized the event as a "historic day" for reasserting Israeli sovereignty over the entirety of Jerusalem.

== See also ==
- American Near East Refugee Aid
- Board of Peace
- International aid to Palestinians
- List of directors and commissioners-general of UNRWA
- Palestine and the United Nations
- Palestine Children’s Relief Fund
- Taylor Force Act
- United Nations Fact Finding Mission on the Gaza Conflict

== Bibliography ==
- UNRWA; UNHCR (2007). "The United Nations and Palestinian Refugees" (PDF).
- UNDPI (2008). "The Question of Palestine and the United Nations" (PDF). DPI/2499. Archived from the original (PDF) on 27 November 2021.
- Gunness, Chris (2011). "Exploding the myths: UNRWA, UNHCR and the Palestine refugees". UNRWA. Ma'an News Agency.
