= Gaza war =

Ongoing armed conflict in the Middle East

- Part of the Gaza–Israel conflict and the Middle Eastern crisis (2023–present)
- Map of Gaza as of 22 April 2026 Gaza Strip under Palestinian control Gaza Strip under Israeli control Evacuated areas inside Israel Maximum extent of the 7 October attacks Areas of Gaza subject to Israeli evacuation orders Yellow Line: (detailed map; timeline)
Date	7 October 2023 – present (3 years, 1 month, 1 week and 5 days)
Location	Gaza Strip and Israel
Status	Ongoing
Territorial changes	Approximately 60% of the Gaza Strip under Israeli military control, along the Yellow Line

Belligerents
Hamas; (Palestine) Palestinian Joint Operations Room	Israel (Note: See American involvement and List of military aid to Israel during the Gaza war.); (Palestine) Anti-Hamas groups; Popular Forces (Note: From May 2024. Popular Forces have been described as a Salafi Jihadist organization with alleged ties to the Islamic State. Several senior leaders in the Popular Forces also allied with the Islamic State in the Sinai.)

Commanders and leaders
(Hamas) Ismail Haniyeh X; (Hamas) Yahya Sinwar †; (Hamas) Khalil al-Hayya; (Hamas) Mohammed Deif X; (Hamas) Mohammed Sinwar X; (Hamas) Izz al-Din al-Haddad X; (Hamas) Mohammed Odeh X; (Hamas) Ali al-Amoudi	(Israel) Benjamin Netanyahu; (Israel) Yoav Gallant; Israel Katz; (Israel) Herzi Halevi; (Israel) Eyal Zamir; (Israel) Ronen Bar; (Israel) David Zini

Units involved
- See Order of battle

Strength
(Hamas) 20,000–40,000	(Israel) 529,500 (Note: Including 169,500 active personnel and 360,000 reservists.)

Casualties and losses
Gaza Strip: 81,416+ reported killed (Note: As of September 2026; including almost 7,400 missing and presumed dead. According to the Gaza Health Ministry the number of fatalities is 74,016.) ("indirect" deaths may be many times higher); 175,068+ wounded; 12,000+ detained; Israel: (Note: Based in Israel proper (1967 borders).); 1,200+ militants killed and 200+ captured; Total killed: 82,616+ (Note: Total is derived from taking the current number of killed in Gaza and the militants killed inside Israel.)	Total: 802+ civilians killed; 1,159+ security personnel killed; 13,500+ civilians and soldiers wounded (Note: As of 22 January 2024. Including 6,424 soldiers (as of 25 October 2026).); 251 captured or abducted (85 killed); Total killed: 2,046+

The Gaza war (Note: Also referred to as the "Israel–Hamas war", "war on Gaza", "Operation Iron Swords" (Hebrew: מִלְחֲמֹת חַרְבוֹת בַּרְזֶל), the "battle of al-Aqsa Flood" (Arabic: معركة طوفان الأقصى), "October 7 war", and others. For more information, see Names.) is an armed conflict in the Gaza Strip and Israel, fought as part of the unresolved Israeli–Palestinian and Gaza–Israel conflicts. The war began on 7 October 2023, when Palestinian militant group Hamas led an attack on Israel, in which 1,195 Israelis and foreign nationals were killed and 251 were taken hostage. Since the start of the Israeli offensive that followed, over 74,000 Palestinians in Gaza have been killed; several studies in The Lancet indicate this figure is likely a significant undercount. Many scholarly sources and international organizations—including UN bodies, NGOs, and the International Association of Genocide Scholars—have concluded that Israel's actions in Gaza constitute genocide under international law. (Note: Attributed to multiple references:) Several countries have also stated that genocide is occurring and have supported legal proceedings before the International Court of Justice. Israel and its supporters have denied that genocide has occurred.

Following the 7 October attacks, Israel launched a bombing campaign and later invaded Gaza on 27 October after clearing militants from its territory. Israeli forces launched several campaigns, including the Rafah offensive, three battles fought around Khan Yunis, and the siege of North Gaza, culminating in a 2025 offensive in Gaza City. They have assassinated Hamas leaders inside and outside of Gaza. A 2023 ceasefire broke down, and a second ceasefire in January 2025 ended with a surprise attack by Israel in March. A third ceasefire came into effect on 10 October after Israel and Hamas agreed to phase one of a US-backed peace plan. As part of the peace plan, the Hamas civil administration in Gaza resigned on 6 July 2026, and an agreement was reached on 31 July for Hamas and other militant organisations in Gaza to disarm, contingent on reconstruction progress and Israel's military withdrawal.

Despite the ceasefire, hostilities have continued, with Israel carrying out airstrikes almost daily and conducting ongoing military operations in the Gaza Strip. By 20 October 2026, at least 1,400 Palestinians and 5 Israeli military personnel had been killed since the ceasefire took effect. Israel has steadily been moving their controversial Yellow Line further westwards into Gaza where its military control and access restrictions have expanded to appropriately 65% of the Gaza Strip by October 2026, up from around 53% when the ceasefire first began, confining 2.1 million residents into an increasingly narrow western zone.

The war has resulted in significant humanitarian costs. A tightened blockade by Israel cut off basic necessities, which led to a partial famine. Around 90% of Gaza's civilian infrastructure has been destroyed and essential services, including water, electricity, and sanitation, have been severely disrupted; large parts are uninhabitable, with most hospitals, religious and cultural landmarks, and educational facilities destroyed. Gazan journalists, health workers, aid workers and other members of civil society have been detained, tortured, and killed. Israel has detained thousands of Palestinians from Gaza and the West Bank since the start of the war. Nearly all of the strip's 2.3 million Palestinians have been forcibly displaced. Over 100,000 Israelis were internally displaced at the height of the conflict. The first day was the deadliest in Israel's history, and the war is the deadliest for Palestinians in the broader conflict.

In September 2025, the UN Commission of Inquiry on the Occupied Palestinian Territory concluded that four of the five acts of genocide as defined by the Genocide Convention had been committed in Gaza since 7 October 2023. A case accusing Israel of genocide is being reviewed by the International Court of Justice. Experts and human rights organizations have also stated that Israel and Hamas have committed other war crimes. Some have described the 7 October attacks as a genocide or genocidal massacre of Israelis. Torture and sexual violence have been committed both by Palestinian militant groups and by Israeli forces.

Israel has received extensive military and diplomatic support from the United States. The war has reverberated regionally, with "Axis of Resistance" groups across several Arab countries and Iran clashing with the US and Israel, including in the Twelve-Day War in 2025, and the 2026 Iran war. A year of strikes between Israel and Hezbollah led to wars in Lebanon in 2024 and in 2026, as well as ongoing Israeli operations in Syria, which contributed to the fall of the Assad regime. The war continues to have regional and international repercussions, with large protests worldwide as well as a surge of antisemitism and anti-Palestinian racism.

== Names ==
Palestinian militant groups refer to the conflict as the "battle of al-Aqsa Flood" (Arabic: معركة طوفان الأقصى), in reference to Operation al-Aqsa Flood. The government of Israel referred to it as the "Iron Swords war" (Hebrew: מִלְחֲמֹת חַרְבוֹת בַּרְזֶל) (Note: Israeli prime minister Benjamin Netanyahu is reported to have backed changing the name of the war to 'Genesis,' evoking the biblical Book of Genesis. A group of Israeli politicians supported the name change because of what they see as "its universality and association with a new reality, separating between darkness and light, good and evil, barbarism and civilization." The plan has also been presented to National Unity Party leader Benny Gantz and Israel's Public Diplomacy Directorate.) until October 2025, when it began using "War of Redemption". Within Israel, it is popularly referred to as the "October 7 war". It has also been referred to as the "Simchat Torah war" because Hamas's attack began on the Jewish holiday of Simchat Torah. Media outlets have variably described it as the "Israel–Hamas war", "war on Gaza", "October 7 war", and the "second Nakba".

== Background ==
Israeli and Palestinian deaths preceding the 2023 Hamas-led attack on Israel. Most of these deaths were civilians.

The Gaza war is part of the Israeli–Palestinian conflict. In the 1948 Palestine war, over 700,000 Palestinians fled or were expelled and the State of Israel was established over most of what had been Mandatory Palestine, with the exception of two separated territories that became known as the West Bank and the Gaza Strip. Following the 1967 Six-Day War, Israel occupied both Palestinian territories. The upcoming period witnessed two popular uprisings by Palestinians against the Israeli occupation: the First and Second Intifadas in 1987 and 2000, with the latter's end seeing Israel's unilateral withdrawal from Gaza in 2005.

Since 2007, the Gaza Strip has been governed by Hamas, an Islamist militant group, while the West Bank remained under the control of the Palestinian Authority. After Hamas's takeover, Israel imposed a blockade that significantly damaged Gaza's economy. Israel justified the blockade by citing security concerns, but international rights groups have characterized it as collective punishment. By 2023, UNRWA reported that 81% of people were living below the poverty level, with 63% being food insecure and dependent on international assistance.

Since 2007, Israel and Hamas, along with other Palestinian militant groups based in Gaza, have engaged in conflict, including four wars, in 2008–2009, 2012, 2014, and 2021. Combined, these conflicts killed approximately 6,400 Palestinians and 300 Israelis. In 2018–2019, there was the Great March of Return, a series of large organized protests near the Gaza-Israel border to call for Palestinian refugees' right to return. The Israel Defense Forces (IDF) violently suppressed the protests, killing hundreds and injuring thousands of Palestinians by sniper fire. Soon after a short 2021 conflict, Hamas's military wing, the Al-Qassam Brigades, started planning an operation against Israel, which became the 7 October attacks. According to diplomats, Hamas had repeatedly said in the months leading up to October 2023 that it did not want another military escalation in Gaza as it would worsen the humanitarian crisis.

Hamas officials stated that the attack was a response to Israeli crimes against the Palestinian people, citing specifically the blockade of the Gaza Strip, desecration of the Al-Aqsa Mosque, Israeli settler violence against Palestinians, and the imprisonment of thousands of Palestinians, whom Hamas sought to release by taking Israeli hostages. Numerous commentators have identified the broader context of Israeli occupation as a cause of the war. Several human rights organizations, including Amnesty International, B'Tselem and Human Rights Watch have likened the Israeli occupation to apartheid, although supporters of Israel dispute this characterization. The Netanyahu government has been criticized within Israel for granting work permits to Gazan residents, facilitating the transfer of funds to Hamas and pursuing relative calm. These actions have been criticized as having backfired in light of the attacks on 7 October 2023.

At the time of the attack, Israel and Saudi Arabia were conducting negotiations to normalize relations. Hamas leaders such as Ismail Haniyeh cited disrupting this "normalization train" as a motive for the October 7 attacks.

== War in Israel and Gaza ==
=== October 7 attacks ===
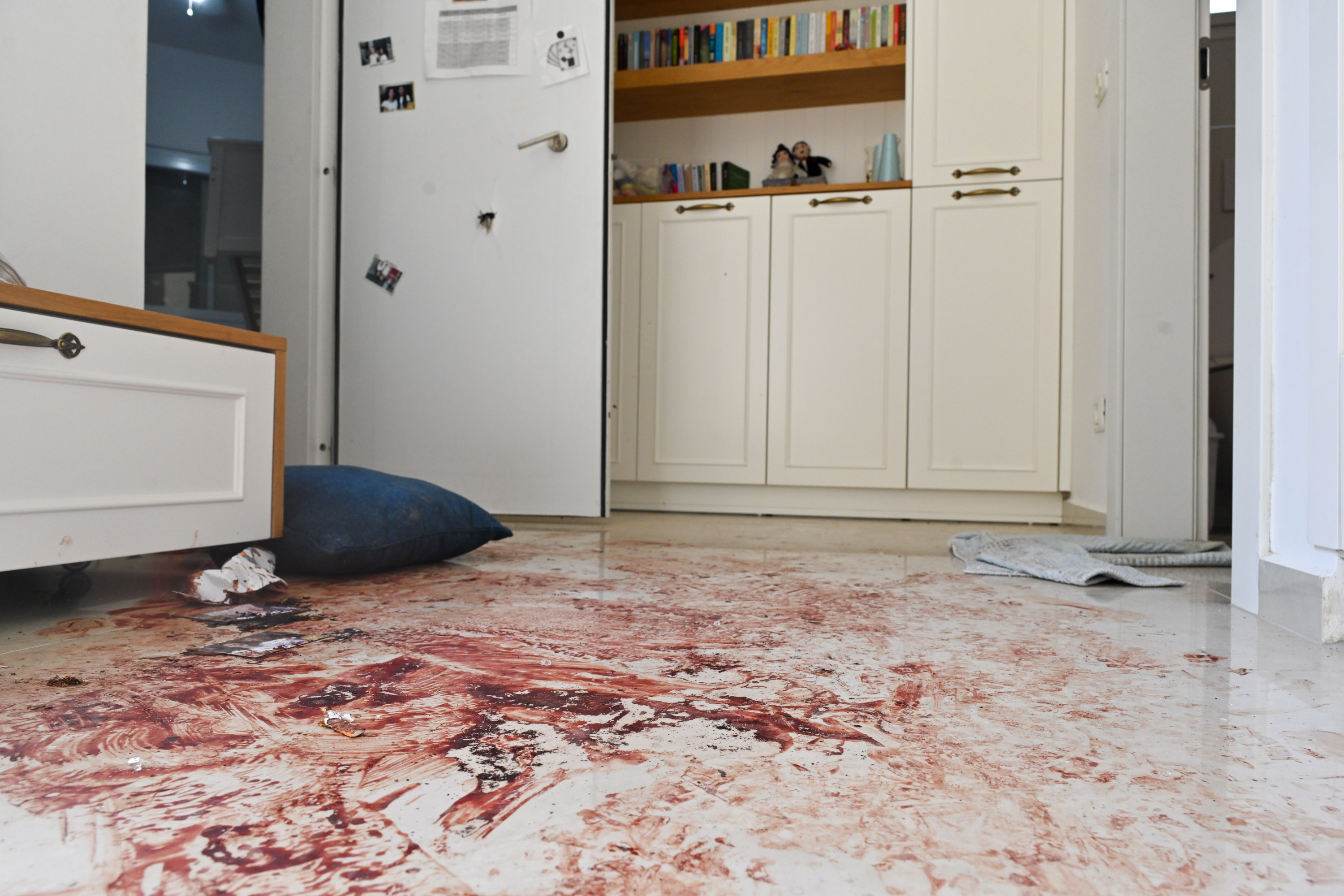
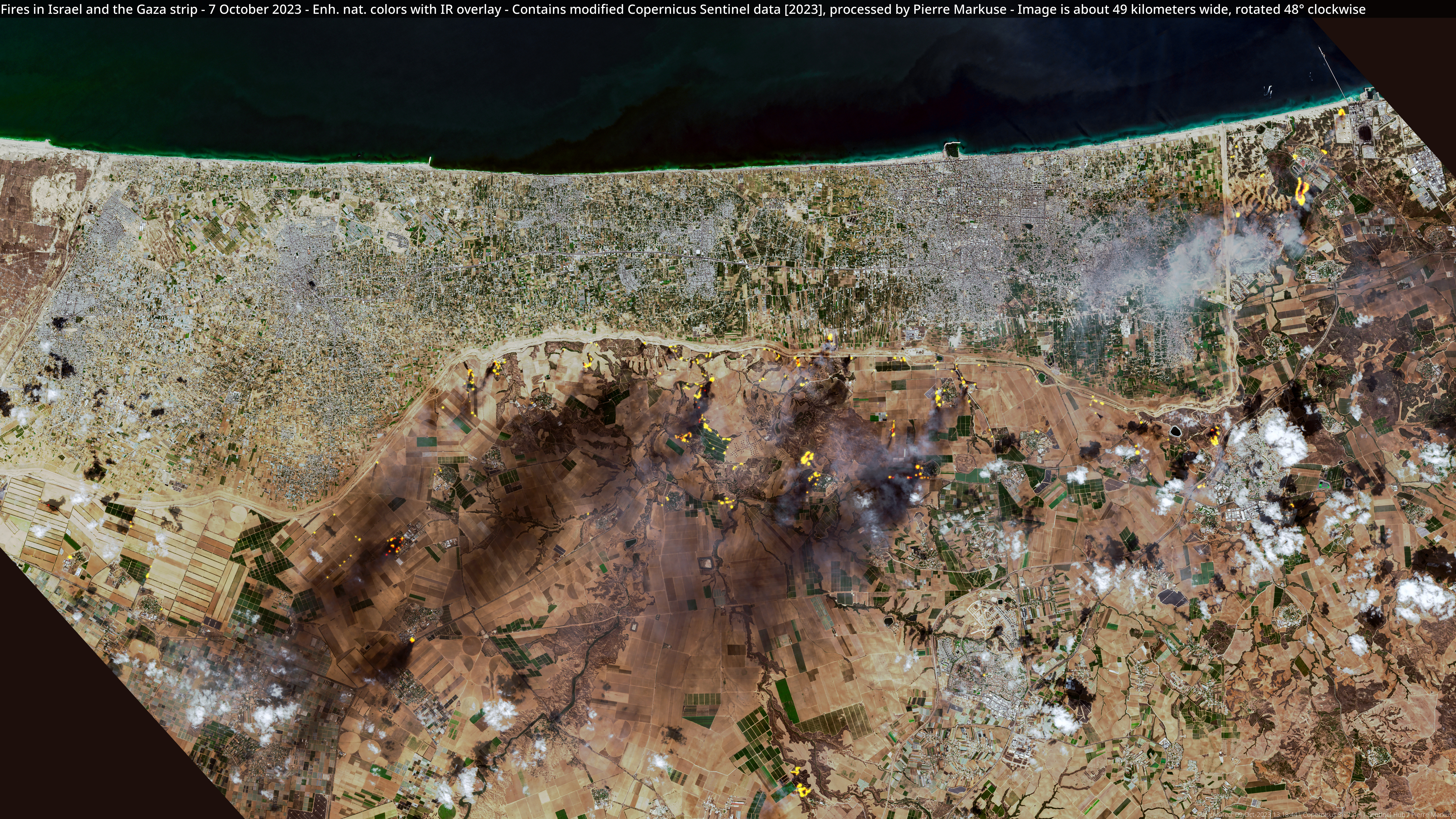
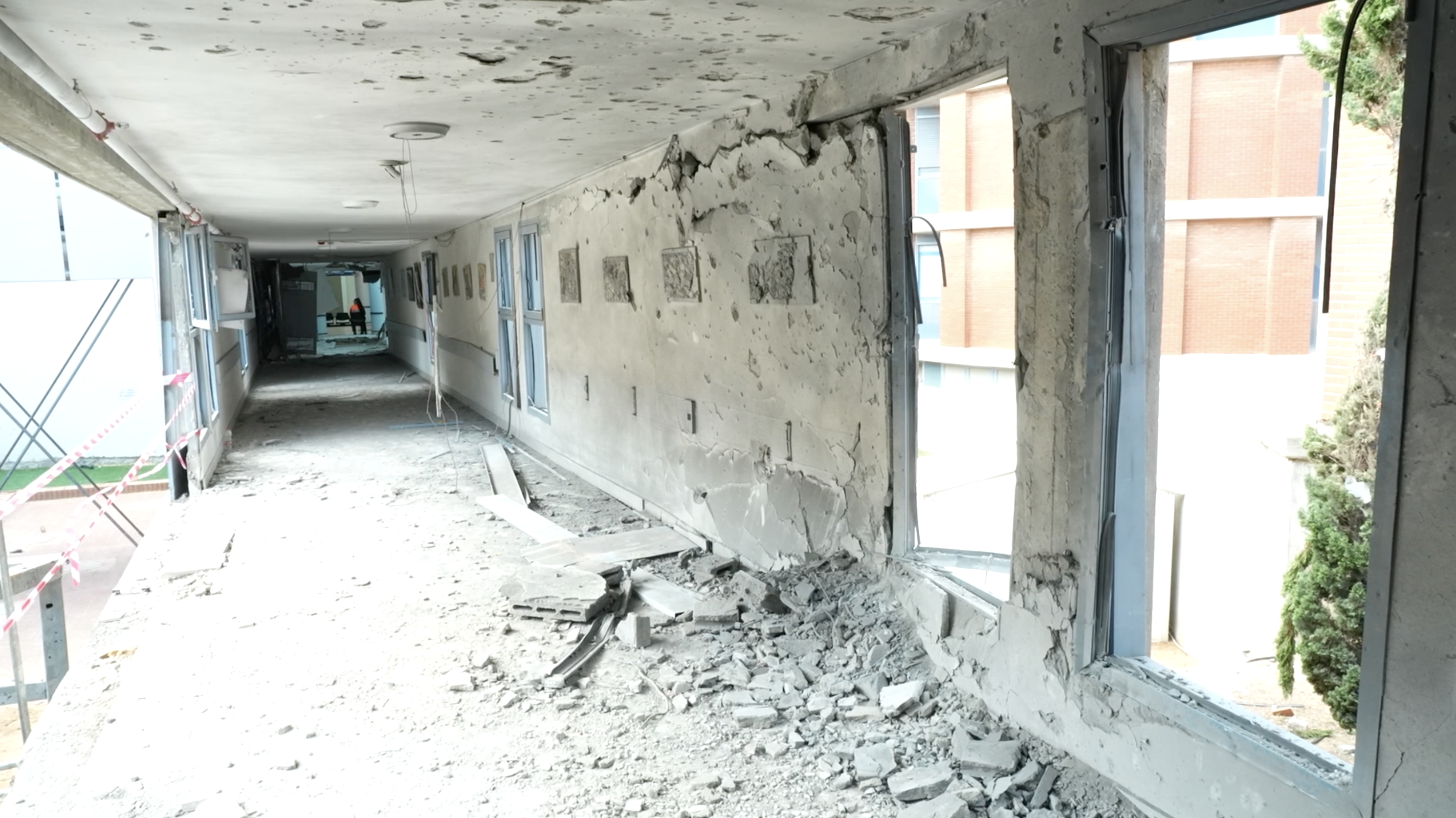
Clockwise from top:
- Approximate situation on 7–8 October
- Aftermath of a Hamas airstrike on the maternity ward of the Barzilai Medical Center
- Satellite view of widespread fires in Israeli areas surrounding the Gaza Strip
- Footage of Israeli soldiers securing the area after the Nova music festival massacre

On the morning of 7 October 2023, during the Jewish holidays of Simchat Torah and Shemini Atzeret on Shabbat, Hamas announced the start of "Operation Al-Aqsa Flood", firing between 3,000 and 5,000 rockets from the Gaza Strip into Israel within a span of 20 minutes, killing at least five people. In the evening, Hamas launched another barrage of 150 rockets. Simultaneously, around 3,000 Hamas militants infiltrated Israel from Gaza using trucks, motorcycles, bulldozers, speedboats, and paragliders. They took over checkpoints at Kerem Shalom and Erez, and created openings in the border fence in five other places.

Militants massacred civilians in several kibbutzim, where they took hostages and set fire to homes. In a massacre at an outdoor music festival near Re'im, at least 325 people were killed, with more injured or taken hostage. In total, 251 people, mostly civilians, were taken hostage, including children, elderly people, and soldiers. Hamas militants also reportedly engaged in mutilation, torture, and sexual and gender-based violence.

The attack was not entirely unexpected; but "Israeli officials received Hamas' battle plans" but deemed them aspirational and dismissed specific warnings. The 7 October attacks were described as "an intelligence failure for the ages" and a "failure of imagination" on the part of the Israeli government. It later emerged that abnormal Hamas movements had been detected the previous day by Israeli intelligence, but the military's alert level was not raised and political leaders were not informed.

The Economist noted that "the assault dwarf[ed] all other mass murders of Israeli civilians", and that "the last time before October 7th that this many Jews were murdered on a single day was during the Holocaust." According to both Hamas officials and external observers, the attack was a calculated effort to create a "permanent" state of war and revive the Palestinian cause.

=== Initial Israeli counter-operation (October 2023) ===
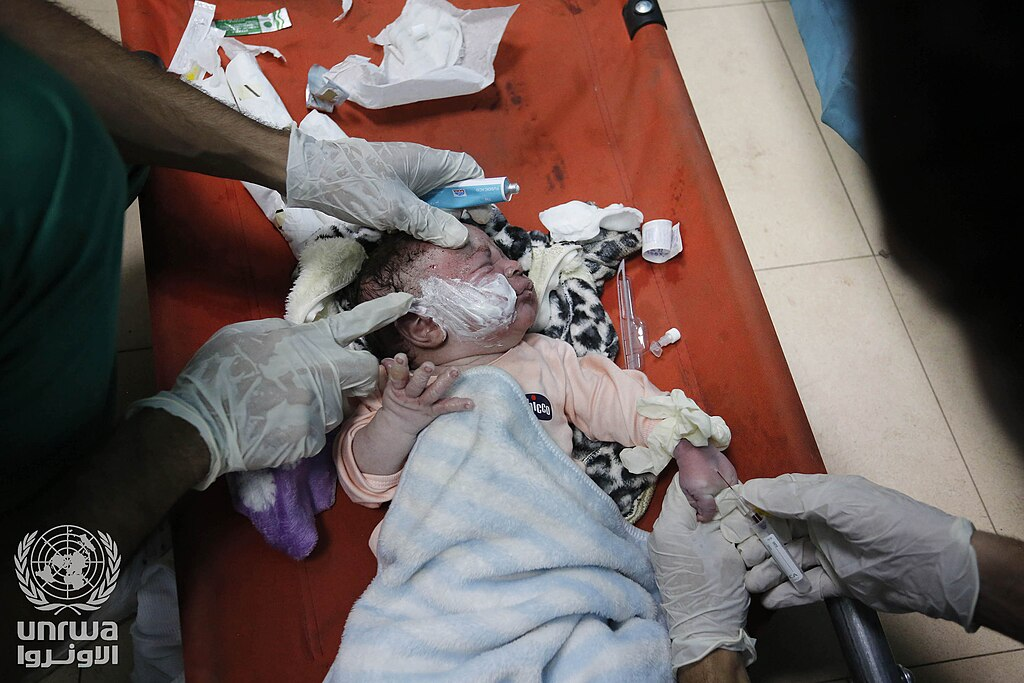
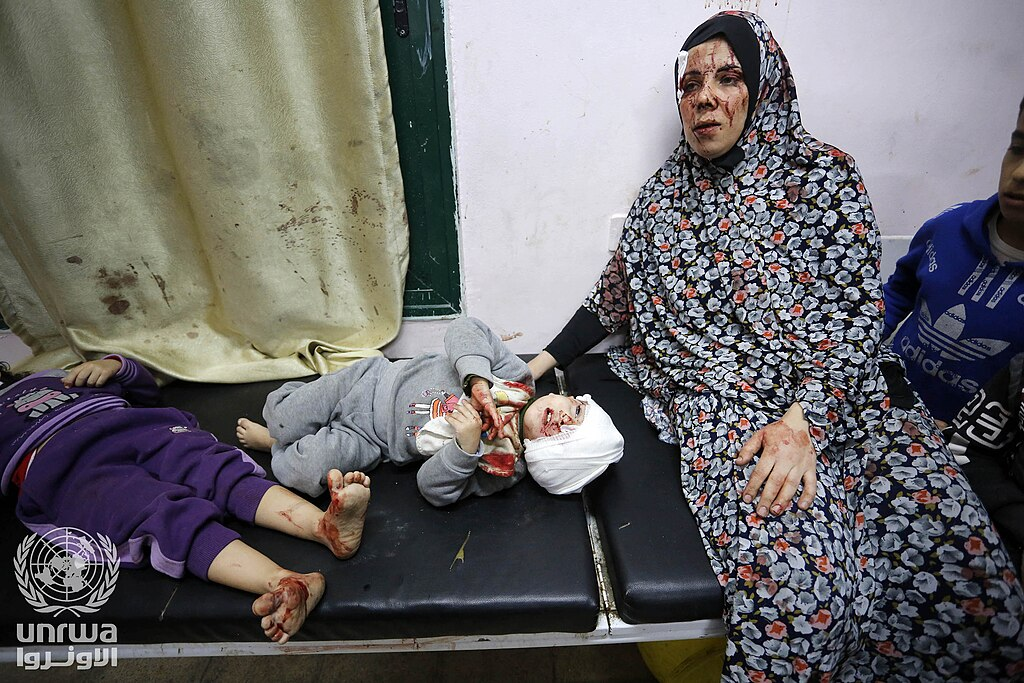
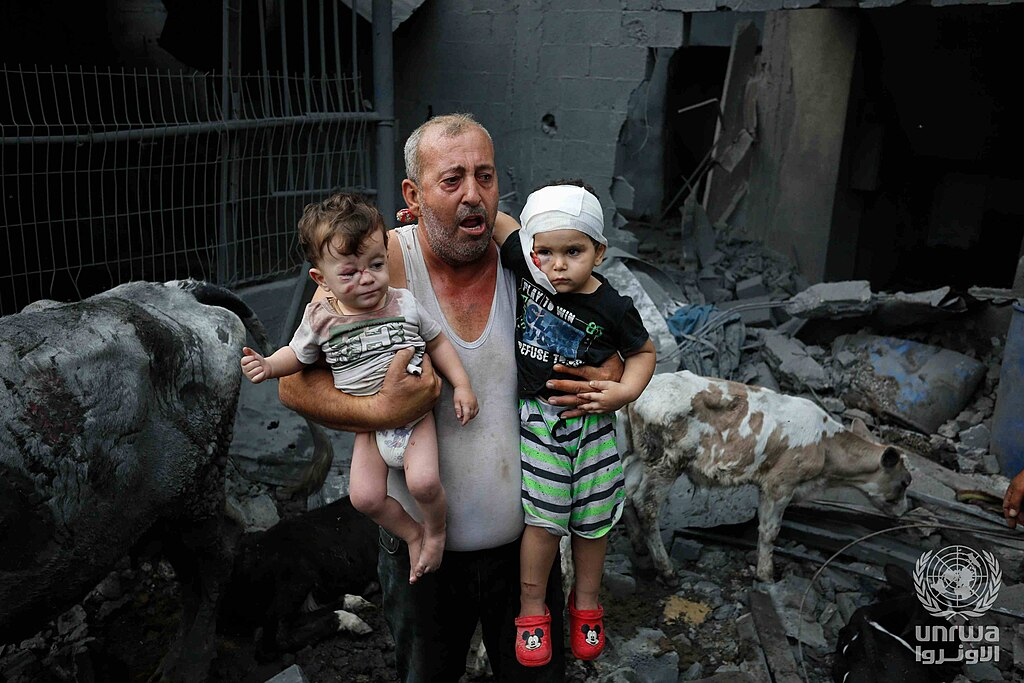
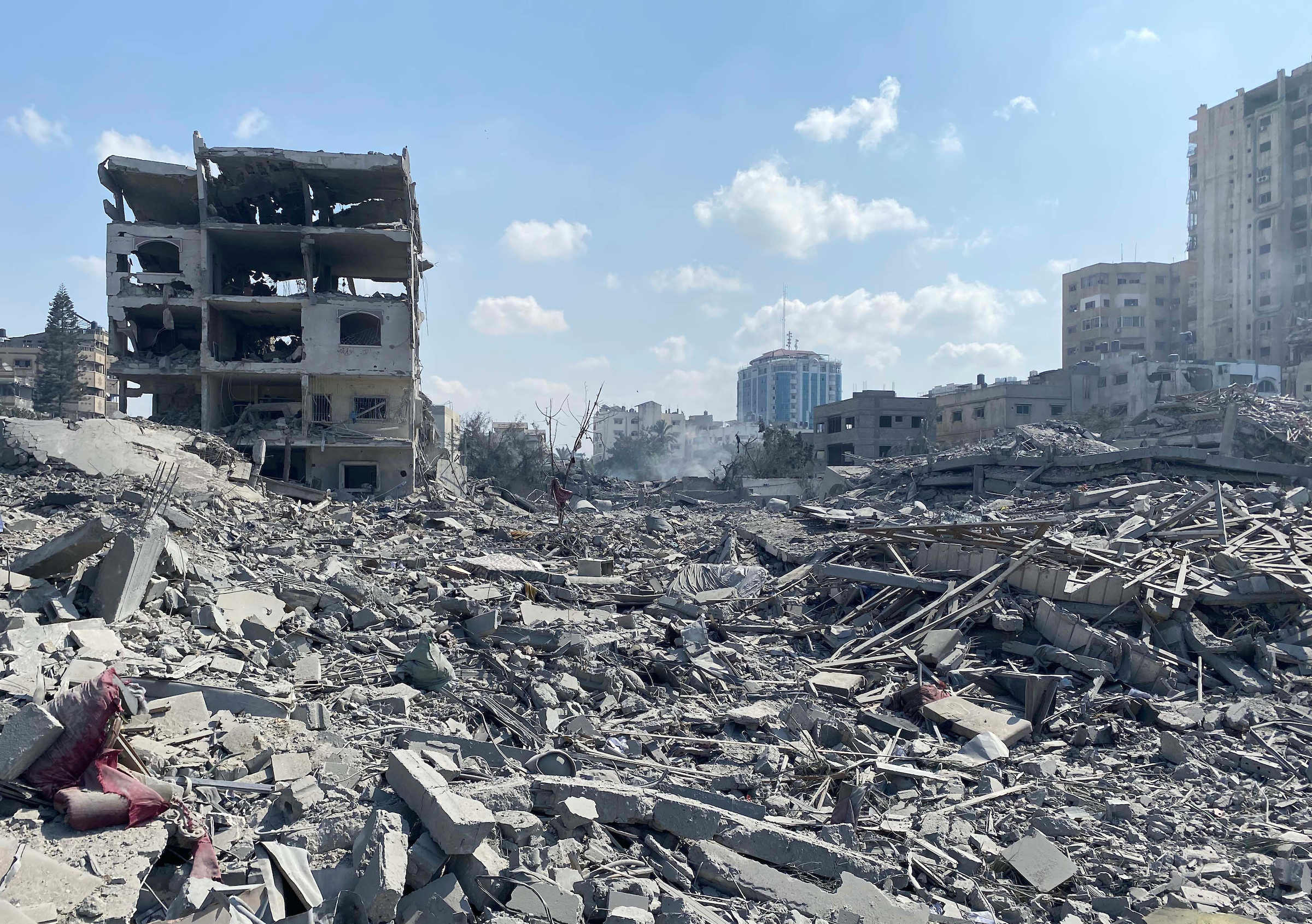
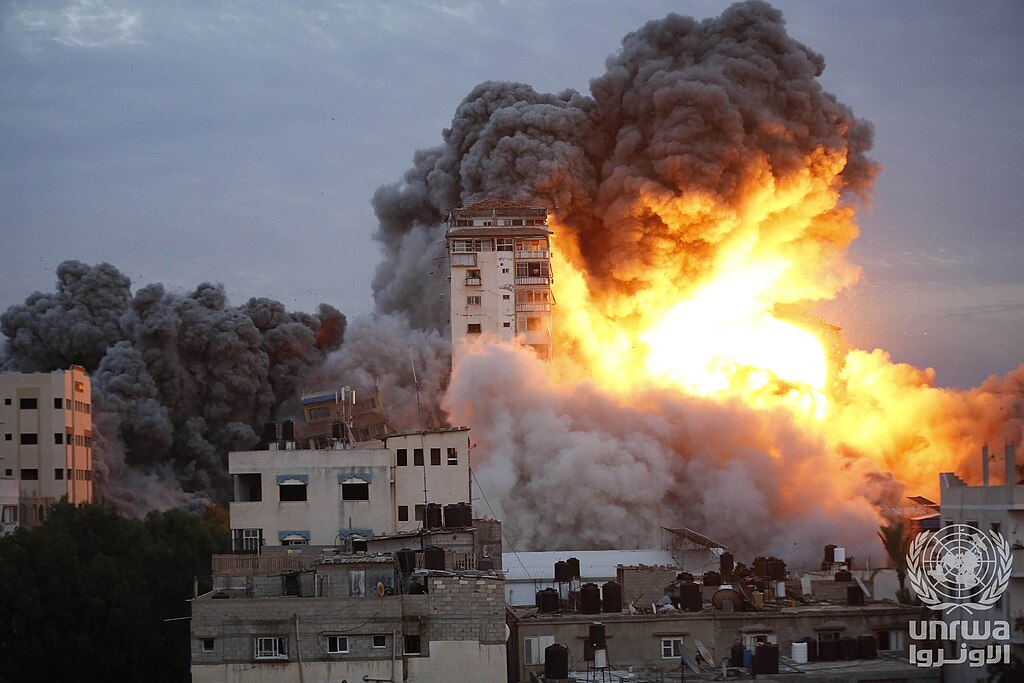
Clockwise from top:
- Palestinian infant receiving treatment following an Israeli airstrike in Deir el-Balah, Gaza Strip
- A Palestinian refugee carries his injured grandchildren during the Israeli bombing of the Nuseirat refugee camp
- Building in the Gaza Strip being destroyed by Israeli missiles
- Damage following an Israeli airstrike on the El-Remal area in Gaza City on October 2023
- Injured Palestinians including children receive treatment at Al-Aqsa Hospital following an Israeli airstrike on the Nuseirat refugee camp

The IDF began Israel's counter-attack several hours after the Hamas-led invasion. The first helicopters sent to support the military reached the Israeli areas surrounding the Gaza Strip an hour after the fighting began. Their crews encountered difficulties in determining which places were occupied by invading militants, and distinguishing between Israeli civilians, IDF soldiers, and Palestinian militants on the ground. A June 2024 UN report and a July 2024 Haaretz investigation revealed that the IDF ordered the Hannibal Directive to be used, killing an unknown number of Israeli civilians and soldiers.

In a televised broadcast, Benjamin Netanyahu, Prime Minister of Israel, announced that the country was at war. He threatened to "turn all the places where Hamas is organized and hiding into cities of ruins", called Gaza "the city of evil", and urged its residents to leave. Overnight, Israel's Security Cabinet voted to act to bring about the "destruction of the military and governmental capabilities of Hamas and Palestinian Islamic Jihad". The Israel Electric Corporation, which supplies 80% of Gaza's electricity, cut off power to the area. The IDF declared a "state of readiness for war", mobilized tens of thousands of army reservists, and declared a state of emergency for areas within 80 kilometers (50 mi) of Gaza. While Ben Gurion Airport and Ramon Airport remained operational, multiple airlines cancelled flights. On 9 or 10 October, Hamas offered to release all civilian hostages held in Gaza if Israel would call off its planned invasion of the Gaza Strip, but the Israeli government rejected the offer.

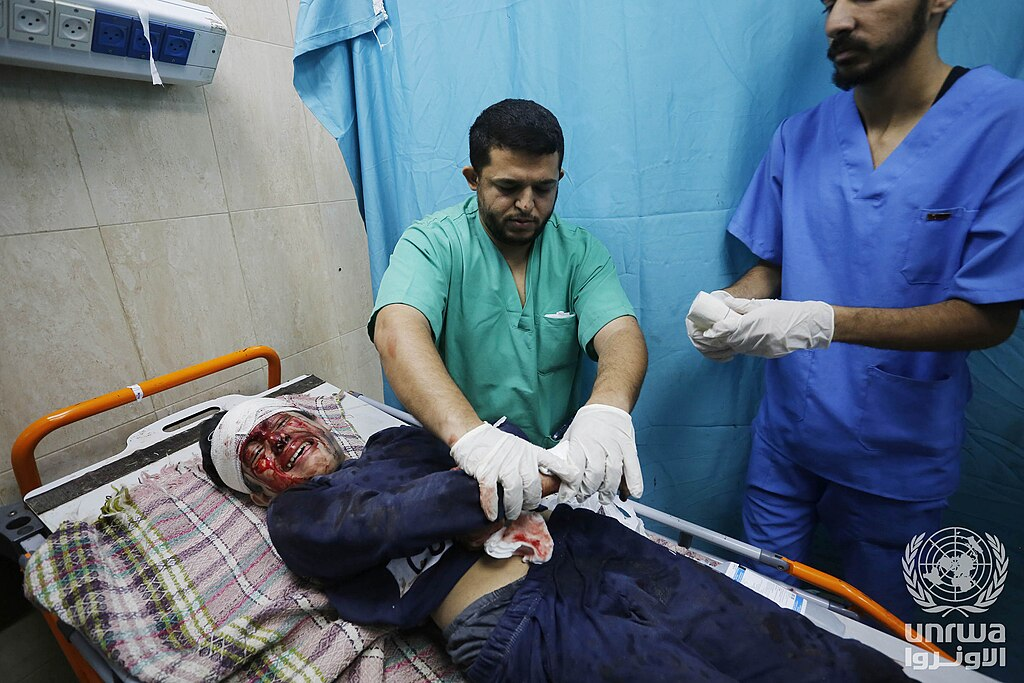
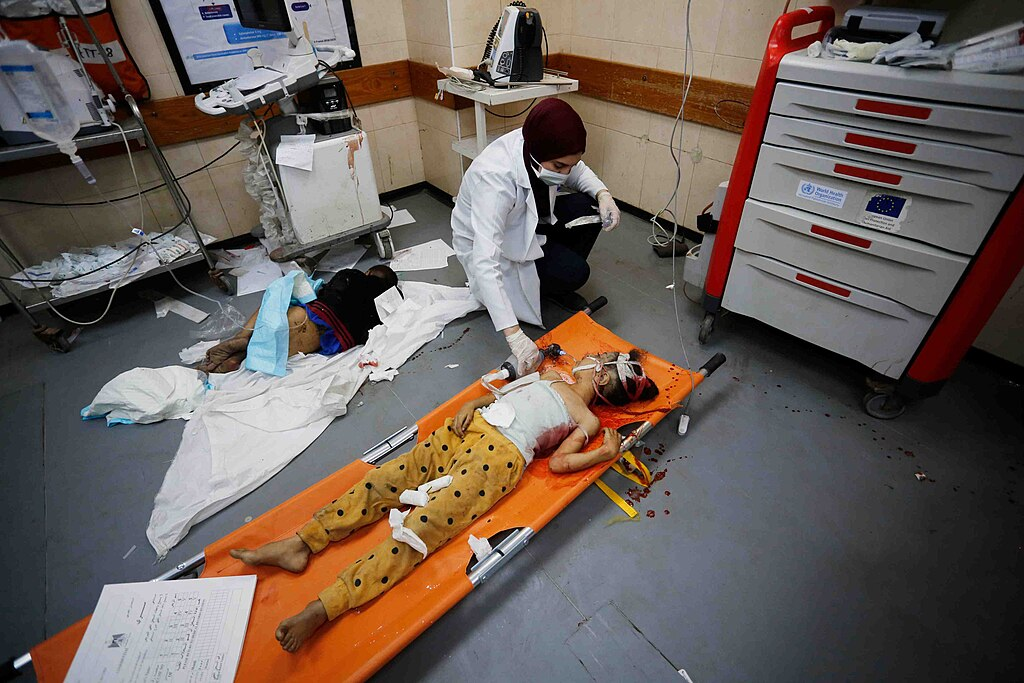
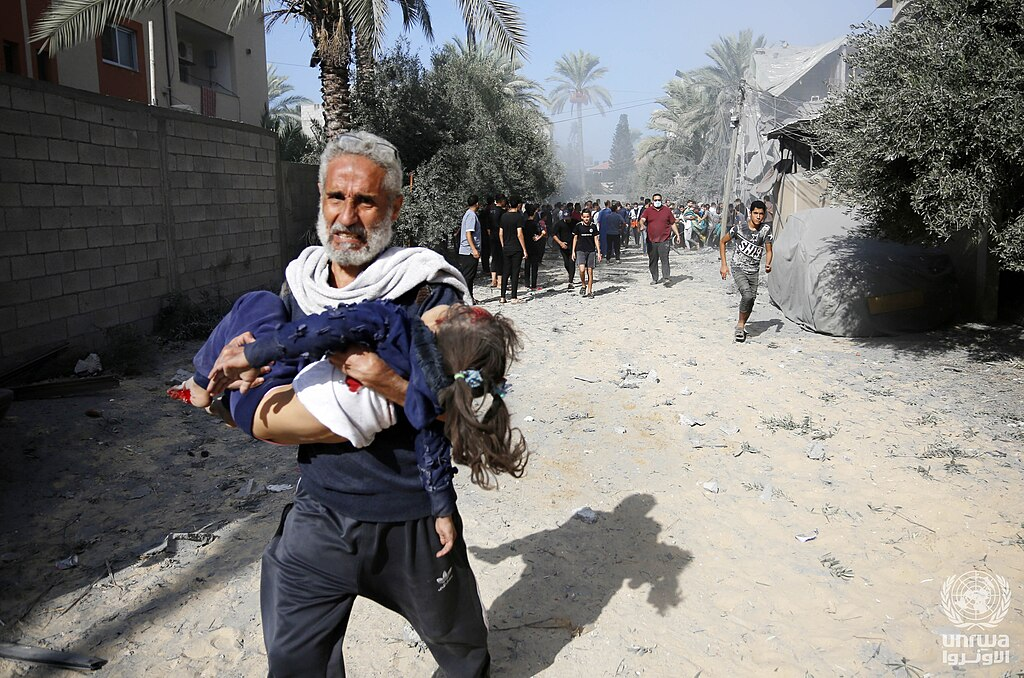
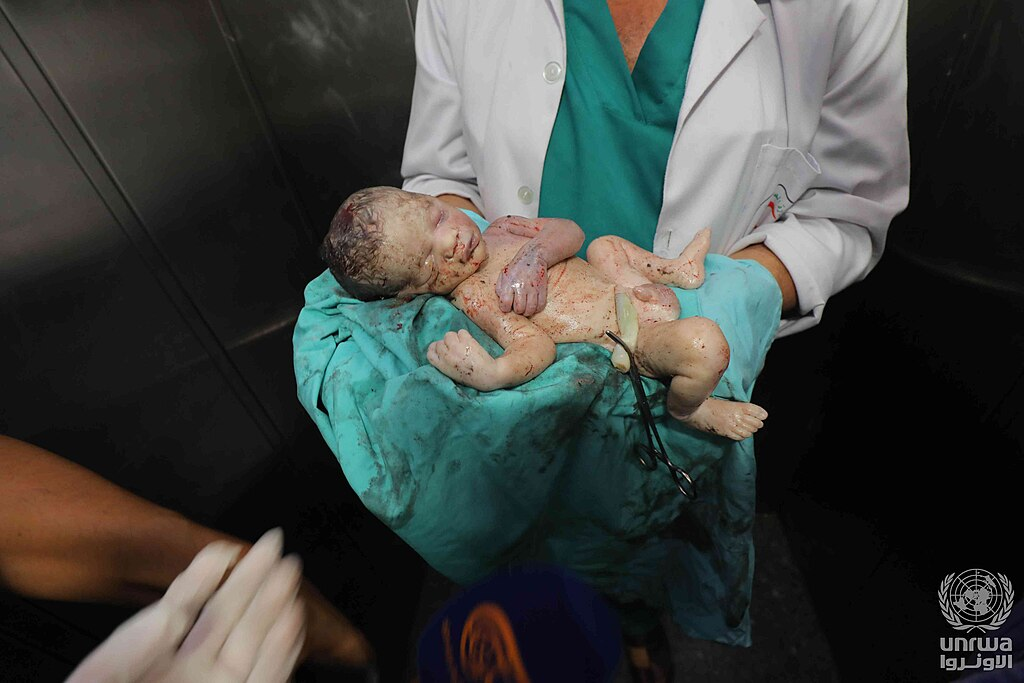
Clockwise from top:
- Doctors treat a Palestinian injured by an Israeli airstrike in Deir el-Balah, Gaza Strip
- Injured Palestinian children receiving treatment
- A newborn baby killed as a result of an Israeli airstrike
- People fleeing following an Israeli airstrike on a house in Deir el-Balah, Gaza Strip
- Video interviews conducted with several survivors of Israeli airstrikes in October 2023

Following the surprise attack, the Israeli Air Force conducted airstrikes that they said targeted Hamas targets, employing its artificial intelligence Habsora ("The Gospel") software. These airstrikes killed, on average, 350 persons per day during the first 20 days. Israel rescued two hostages before declaring a state of war for the first time since the 1973 Yom Kippur War. On 9 October, Defense Minister Gallant announced a "complete siege" of the Gaza Strip, cutting off electricity and blocking the entry of food and fuel. Gallant backed down under pressure from US President Joe Biden, and a deal was struck ten days later to allow aid into Gaza. The first such aid convoy entered Gaza on 21 October, while fuel did not arrive until November.

On 13 October, the IDF ordered all civilians in Gaza City to evacuate to areas south of the Wadi Gaza within 24 hours. The Hamas Authority for Refugee Affairs told residents in northern Gaza to defy those orders. The Israeli order was widely condemned as "outrageous" and "impossible", and calls were made for it to be reversed. As a part of the order, the IDF outlined a six-hour window on 13 October for refugees to flee south along specified routes. An explosion along one of the safe routes killed 70 Palestinians. Israel and Hamas blamed each other for the attack. The IDF said Hamas set up roadblocks to keep Gaza residents from evacuating. Israeli officials, foreign governments and intergovernmental organizations condemned Hamas's alleged use of hospitals and civilians as human shields, which Hamas contested.

On 17 October, Israel bombed areas of southern Gaza. Late in the evening, an explosion occurred in the parking lot of the Al-Ahli Arabi Baptist Hospital in the center of Gaza City, killing hundreds. The ongoing conflict prevented independent on-site analysis. Palestinian statements that it was an Israeli airstrike were denied by the IDF, which stated that the explosion resulted from a failed rocket launch by Palestinian Islamic Jihad, who denied any involvement.

=== Initial invasion and first ceasefire (October–November 2023) ===
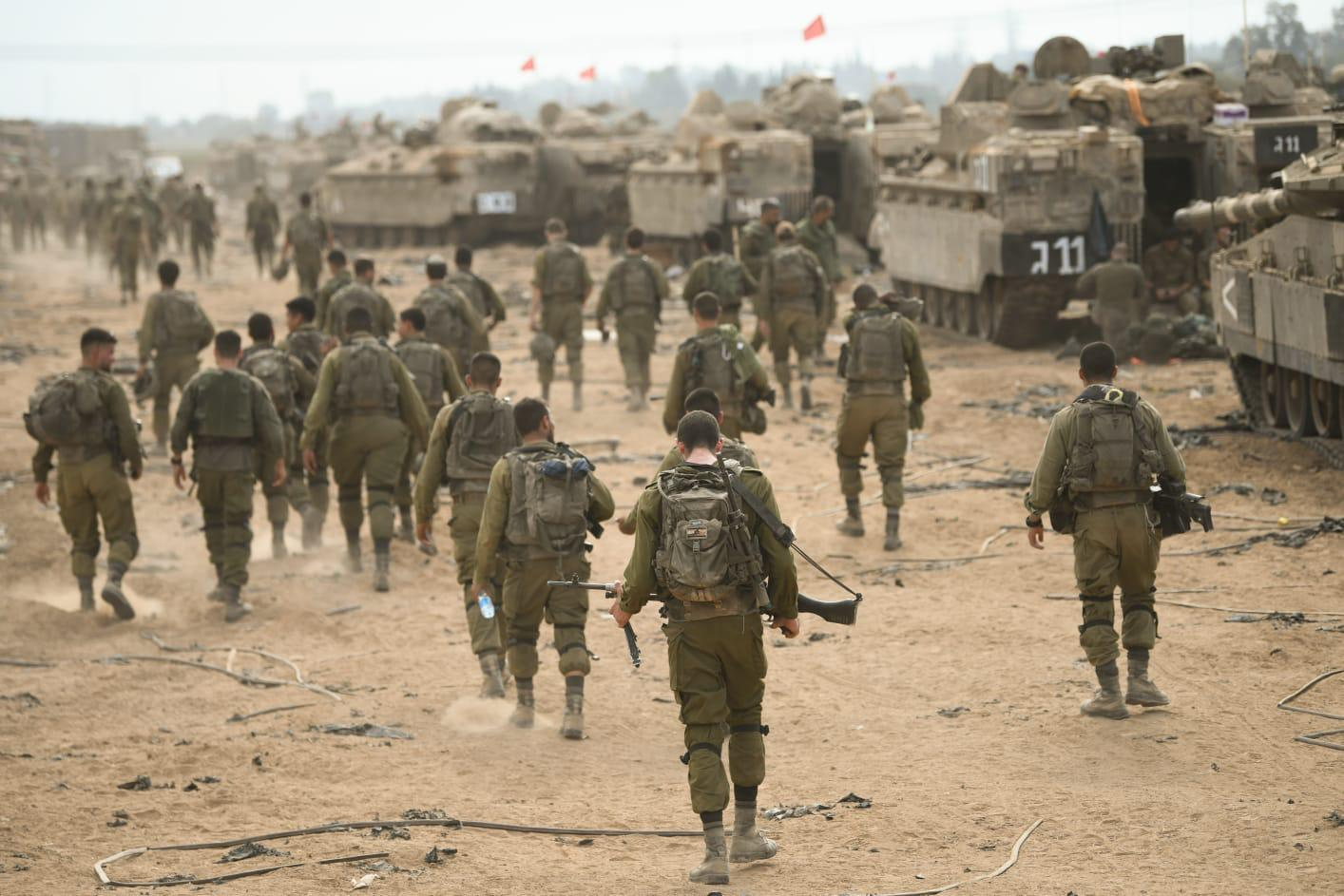
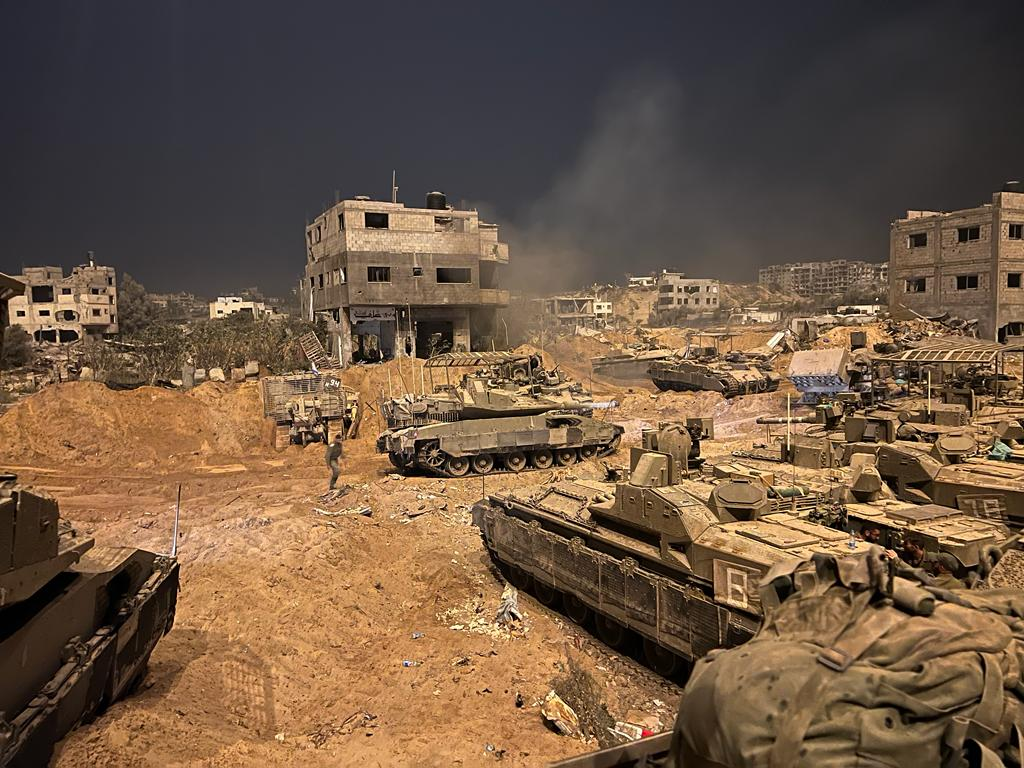
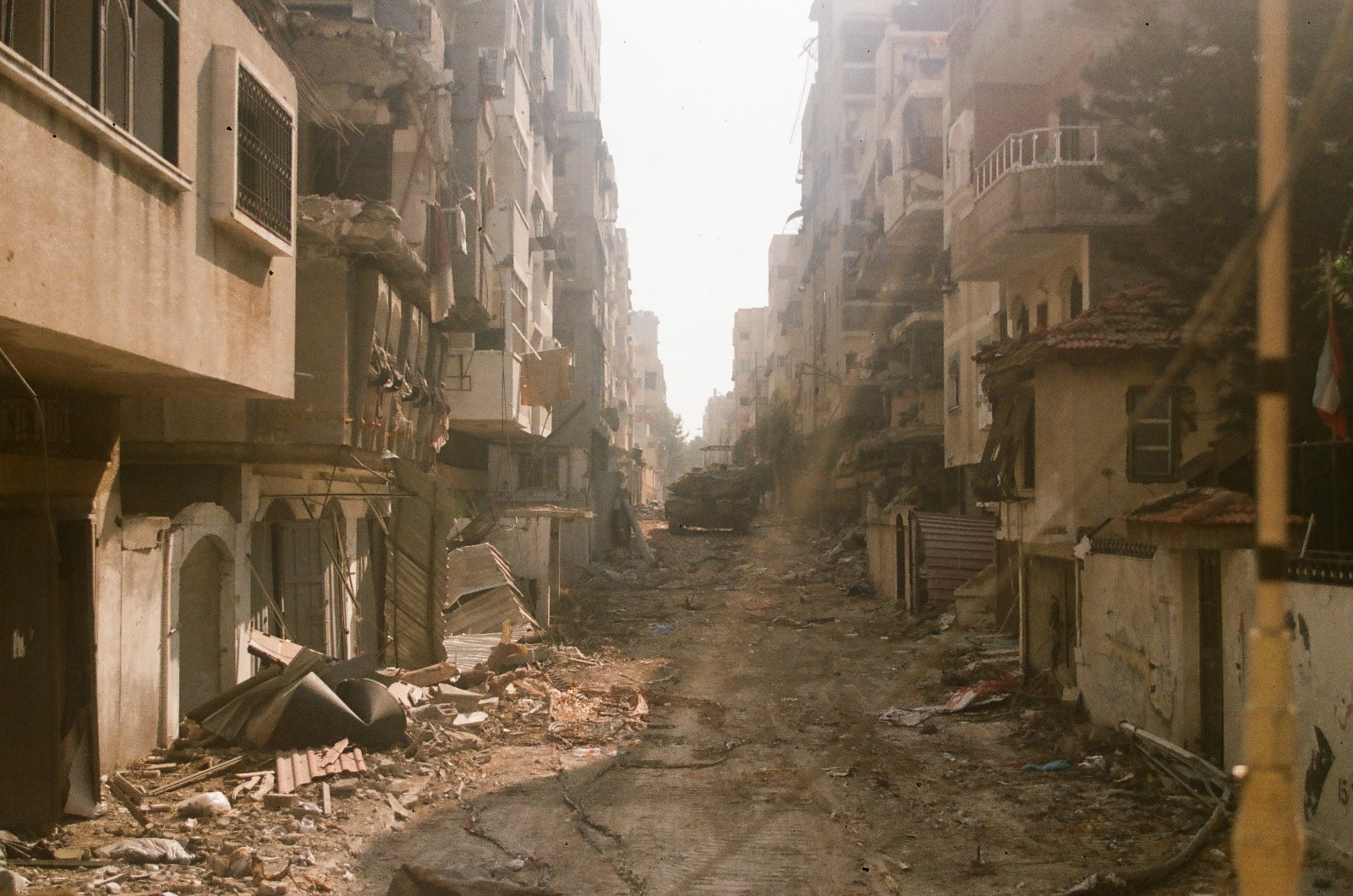
Israeli military during ground operations in Gaza

On 27 October, after building up an invasion force of over 100,000 soldiers, the IDF launched a large-scale ground incursion into parts of northern Gaza. Israeli airstrikes targeted the area around al-Quds hospital, where around 14,000 civilians were believed to be sheltering. The following day, the IDF struck Jabalia refugee camp, killing 50 and wounding 150 Palestinians. Israel said the attack killed a senior Hamas commander, whose presence Hamas denied, and dozens of militants. The attack resulted in several ambassador recalls.

External videos
- Gazan child speaks of having to carry a decapitated body after Israeli strike on Jabalia (via The Irish Times)

On 31 October, Israel bombed a six-story apartment building in central Gaza, killing at least 106 civilians including 54 children in what Human Rights Watch called an "apparent war crime". On 1 November, the first group of evacuees left Gaza for Egypt. Five hundred evacuees, comprising critically wounded and foreign nationals, were evacuated over several days. On 22 November, Israel and Hamas reached a temporary ceasefire agreement, providing for a four-day pause in hostilities, the release of 50 hostages held in Gaza, and the release of approximately 150 Palestinian women and children incarcerated by Israel.

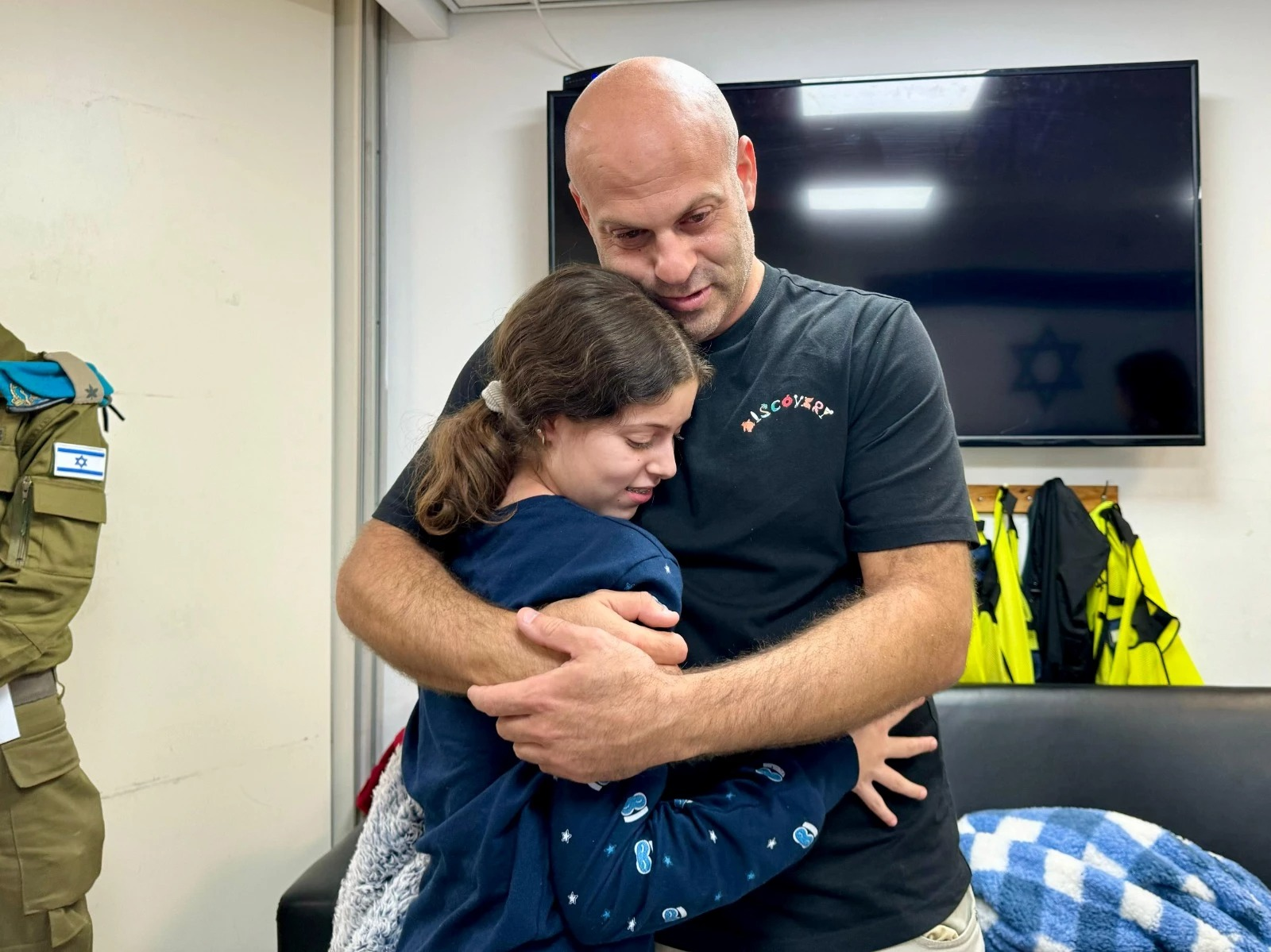
13-year old Israeli hostage released by Hamas during the first ceasefire, 26 November 2023

Following the introduction of a Qatari-brokered truce on 24 November 2023, active fighting in Gaza ceased. Hamas exchanged some hostages for Palestinian prisoners held by Israel. Israel arrested almost as many Palestinians as it released during the truce. Prisoner exchanges continued until 28 November, when both Israel and Hamas accused each other of violating the truce. On 30 November, in a "last-minute agreement", Hamas released eight hostages in exchange for the release of 30 imprisoned Palestinians and a one-day truce extension. The truce expired on 1 December, as Israel and Hamas blamed each other for failing to agree on an extension.

==== Strategy ====
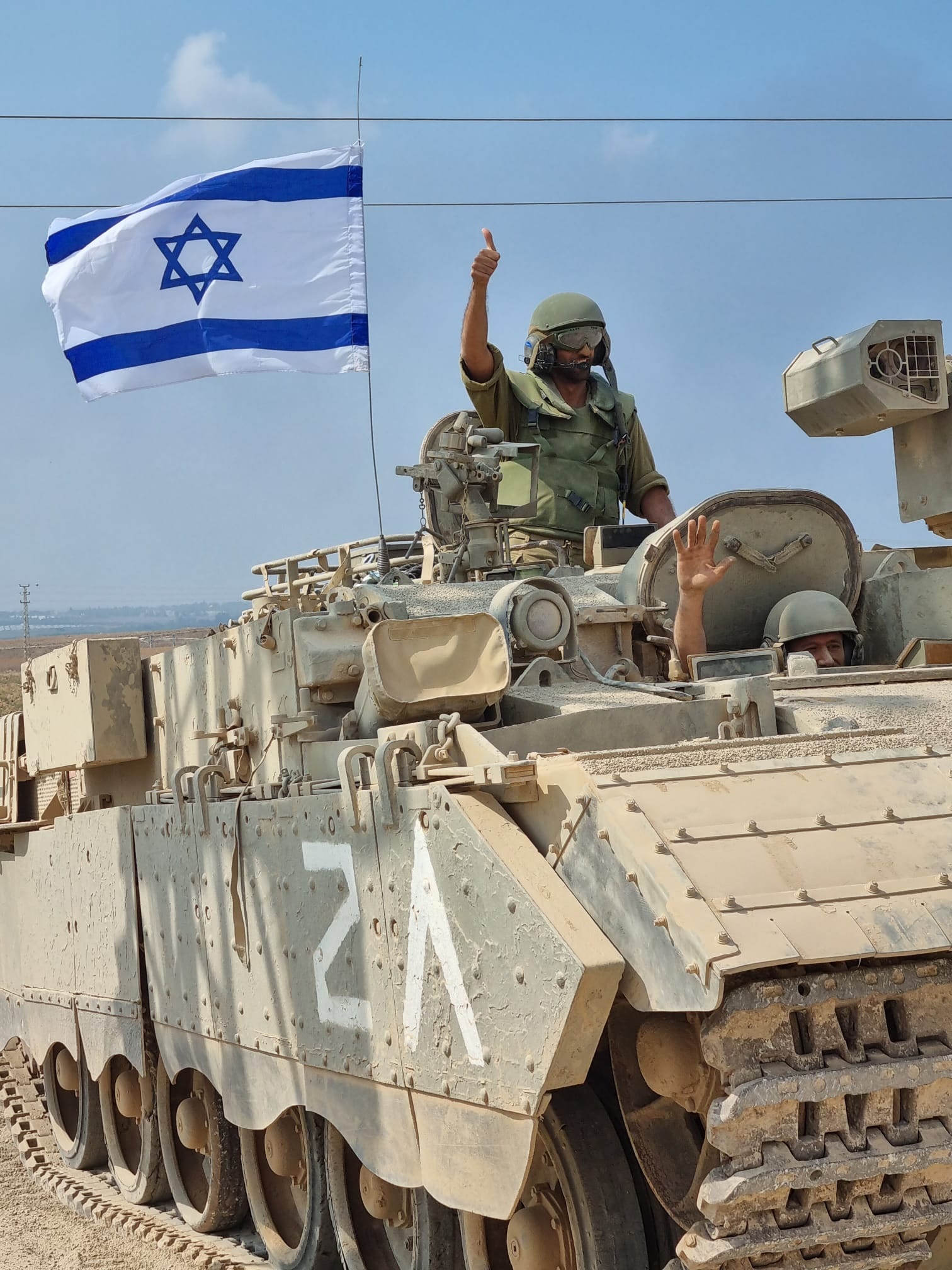
Israeli soldiers in an APC before invasion of the Gaza Strip

When Israeli troops entered the Gaza Strip and began to maintain a persistent physical presence in the region beginning on 27 October 2023, Israel's military adopted a communications strategy designed to preserve operational flexibility and security. The United States urged Israel to avoid a full-scale invasion and to instead conduct "surgical" operations to avoid casualties and a regional escalation. When the IDF initiated Operation Gideon's Chariots in May 2025, the systematic destruction of infrastructure became an explicit component of official military policy and was implemented with increased intensity. Notably, private contractors were engaged in the operation.

The military strategies employed by Hamas have historically encompassed a blend of conventional and insurgent tactics. As a result of the war, the group has shifted "back into a guerrilla fighting force", employing the use of hit-and-run operations and operating in smaller cells of fighters, aiming to demonstrate that they are capable of continuing to fight a prolonged war. Hamas's strategy also relies on the underground tunnel system, which can be used as shelter for Hamas militants and leaders, storing weapons, and detaining hostages.

Sources close to Hamas leadership said that they counted on the international pressure for Israel to end the siege due to mounting civilian casualties and achieve a ceasefire. Hamas believed that together with strikes by Hezbollah and Iran and the uprising in the West Bank, they would cause Israel to collapse, while Israeli retaliation against Gaza would kill many civilians but undermine their crucial international support. Some, including Israel, have accused Hamas of deliberately using Palestinian civilians as human shields. Such claims have been disputed. In February 2024, Forensic Architecture (FA) examined the evidence that Israel provided at the ICJ regarding Hamas's alleged use of civilian facilities for military use. FA said that much of the Israeli evidence was misleading or false.

=== Resumption of hostilities (December 2023 – January 2024) ===
Israel adopted a grid system to order precise evacuations within Gaza. It was criticized as confusing and inaccessible, due to the lack of electricity and internet connectivity in Gaza. Some evacuation instructions were vague or contradictory, and Israel sometimes struck areas it had told people to evacuate to. Law experts called these warnings ineffective. Amnesty International found no evidence of Hamas targets at the sites of some strikes, and requested that they be investigated as possible war crimes. On 6 December, Refaat Alareer, a prominent writer in Gaza, was killed by an Israeli airstrike, after which his poem "If I Must Die" was widely circulated.

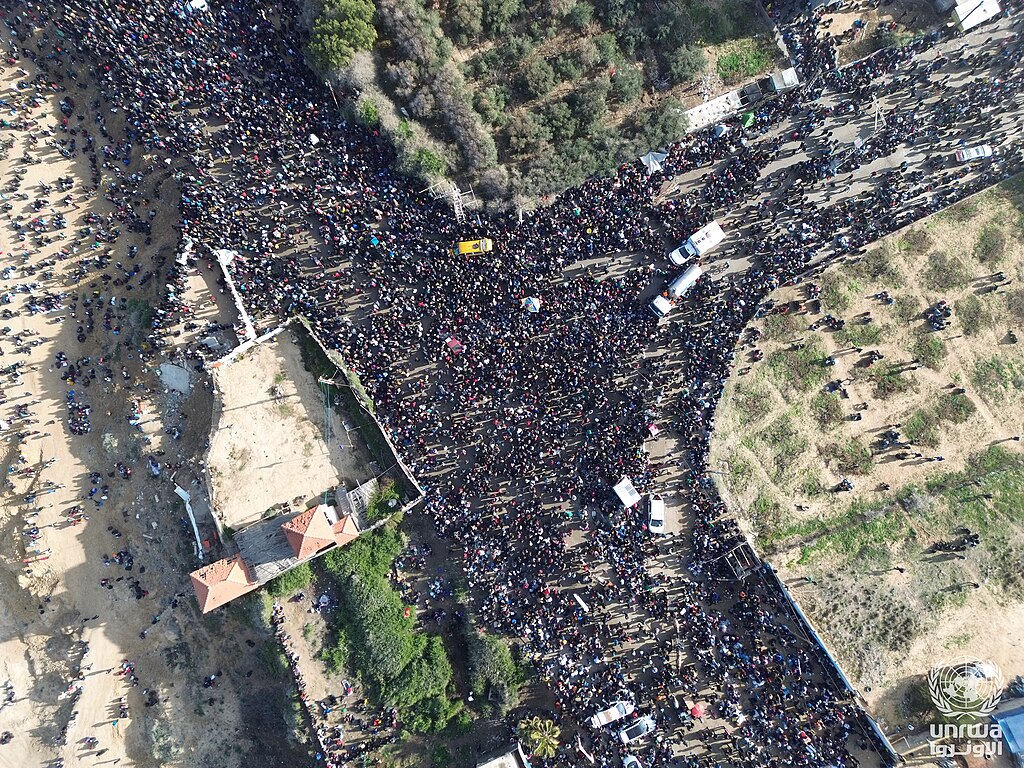
An aerial photo of displaced Palestinians waiting in northern Nuseirat to return to their homes in Gaza

By December, IDF troops had reached the centers of Khan Yunis, Jabalia, and Shuja'iyya. Intensified bombing pushed Palestinian civilians south to Rafah. Between 7 and 10 December, Israel detained more than 150 men; according to Israel, they surrendered en masse, but this account was disputed by several publications. On 15 December, the IDF killed three Israeli hostages in a friendly fire incident.

On 1 January 2024, Israel withdrew from neighborhoods in North Gaza. On 15 January, Israeli Defense Minister Yoav Gallant said the most intense fighting in the north of the Gaza Strip had ended, and a new phase of low-intensity fighting was about to begin. By 18 January, the IDF, who had previously stated that Hamas control over North Gaza was "dismantled", reported that Hamas had significantly rebuilt its fighting strength in North Gaza.

On 22 January, 24 IDF soldiers died in the deadliest day for the IDF since the invasion began. Of these, 21 died when Palestinian militants fired an RPG at a tank, causing adjacent buildings to collapse. On 29 January, Israeli forces killed Hind Rajab, a five-year-old girl, and six of her family members when the car they were driving was struck by Israeli tank and machine gun fire; two rescue workers attempting to retrieve Rajab were also killed. The Red Crescent released the audio from Rajab's phone call with rescue workers, causing international outrage over her death.

=== Build-up to the Rafah offensive (February–April 2024) ===
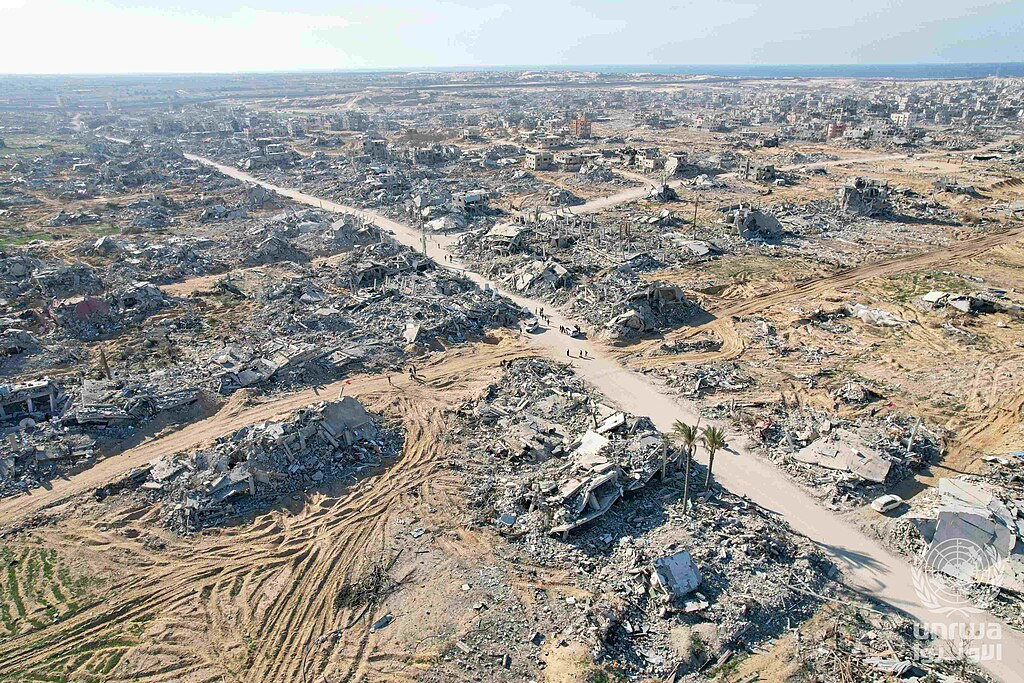
An aerial view showing destruction in Rafah after Israeli forces withdrawal and as the ceasefire took hold, Gaza Strip

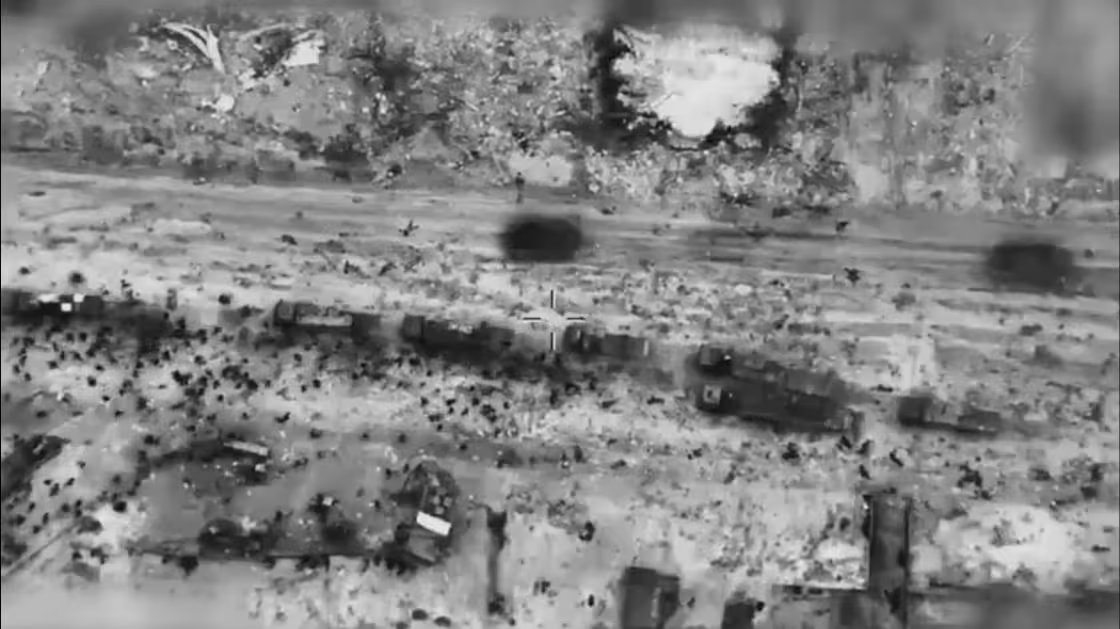
An aerial view of the Flour Massacre captured by an Israeli drone, February 2024

Between February and May 2024, preparations to invade Rafah became a dominant theme in Israeli officials' public rhetoric. On 12 February, Israel conducted a hostage rescue operation in Rafah along with a bombing campaign. Food supplies increasingly became an issue. On 5 February, Israeli shelling damaged a marked UNRWA convoy, forcing UNRWA to suspend its operations for almost three weeks, affecting 200,000 people. On 29 February, Israeli forces opened fire on Palestinians that swarmed aid trucks in southwest of Gaza City, killing 100 and wounding 750. Some of the victims were run over by trucks as panic spread. Survivors described it as an intentional ambush. On 1 March, the United States announced it would begin to airdrop food aid into Gaza. Some experts called the initiative performative, saying it would not alleviate the food situation. During his State of the Union Address, Biden announced that a temporary port on Gaza's coast would be constructed for aid delivery.

Al-Shifa Hospital, previously besieged in November 2023, was raided again between 18 March and 1 April. Israeli forces killed Faiq al-Mabhouh, who they said was head of the operations directorate of Hamas's internal security service. Hamas said al-Mabhouh was in charge of civil law enforcement and had been coordinating aid deliveries to north Gaza. The IDF said it killed 200 militants in the hospital fighting, including senior Hamas leaders, while also arresting 500 confirmed militants; this account was disputed. Survivors denied that militants had organized on the hospital grounds. Israeli forces were accused of leaving the hospital with blown out walls and blackened frame, and of killing 400 Palestinians.

A March UN Security Council resolution calling for an immediate ceasefire in Gaza for Ramadan was ignored by the IDF. On 1 April, seven international aid workers from World Central Kitchen (WCK) were killed in an Israeli airstrike south of Deir al-Balah. WCK, who said their vehicles were clearly marked and their location known to Israel, subsequently withdrew from Gaza alongside ANERA and Project HOPE. On 4 April, Israel opened the Erez Crossing for the first time since 7 October after US pressure.

By 6 March, Israel had completed a new east–west road in Gaza. It was intended to mobilize troops and supplies, to connect and defend IDF positions on al-Rashid and Salah al-Din streets, and prevent people in the south of Gaza from returning to the north. On 7 April, Israel withdrew from the south Gaza Strip, with only one brigade remaining in the Netzarim Corridor in the north. Displaced Palestinians began to return. Israel planned to initiate its ground offensive in Rafah around mid-April, but postponed to consider its response to the Iranian strikes on Israel. On 25 April, Israel intensified strikes on Rafah ahead of its threatened invasion.

=== Beginning of the Rafah offensive (May–July 2024) ===
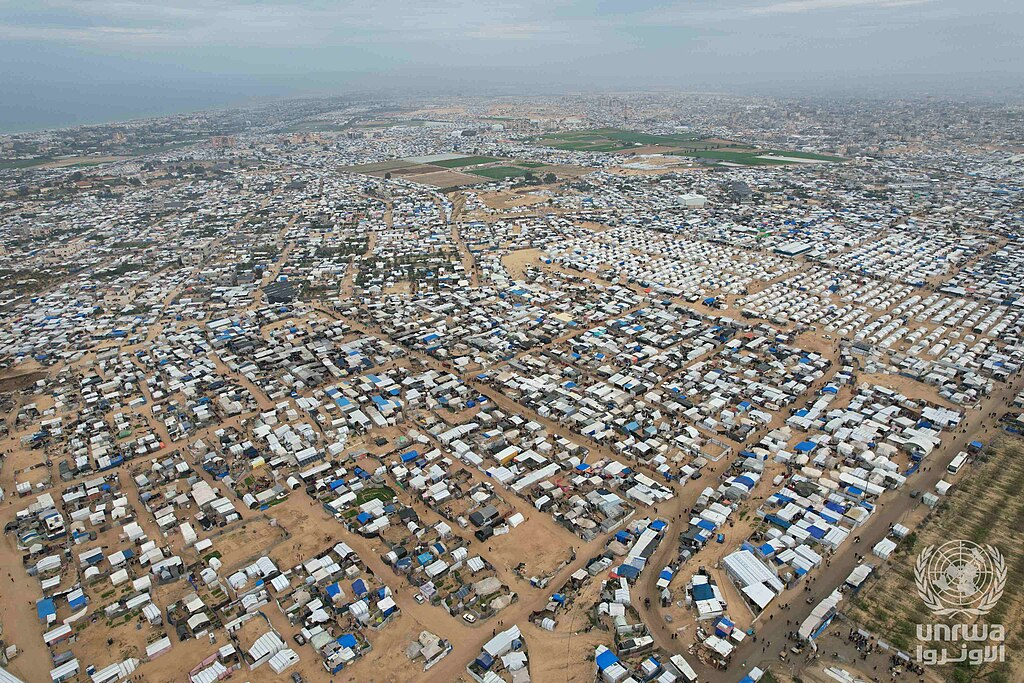
An aerial view of Al-Mawasi area where displaced Palestinians live in tents, Gaza Strip

On 6 May, the IDF ordered 100,000 civilians in eastern Rafah to evacuate to Al-Mawasi, west of Khan Yunis. Later that day, Hamas announced that it had accepted the terms of a ceasefire brokered by Egypt and Qatar. The deal included a 6-week ceasefire and exchange of prisoners. However, Israel rejected this deal, saying it would continue to negotiate while the military operation on Rafah was ongoing to "exert military pressure on Hamas". On 31 May, the United States announced a ceasefire framework.

The same day, the IDF entered the outskirts of Rafah, seizing control of the Gaza side of the Rafah Crossing to Egypt the following day. By 15 May, an estimated 600,000 had fled Rafah and another 100,000 from the north, according to the United Nations.

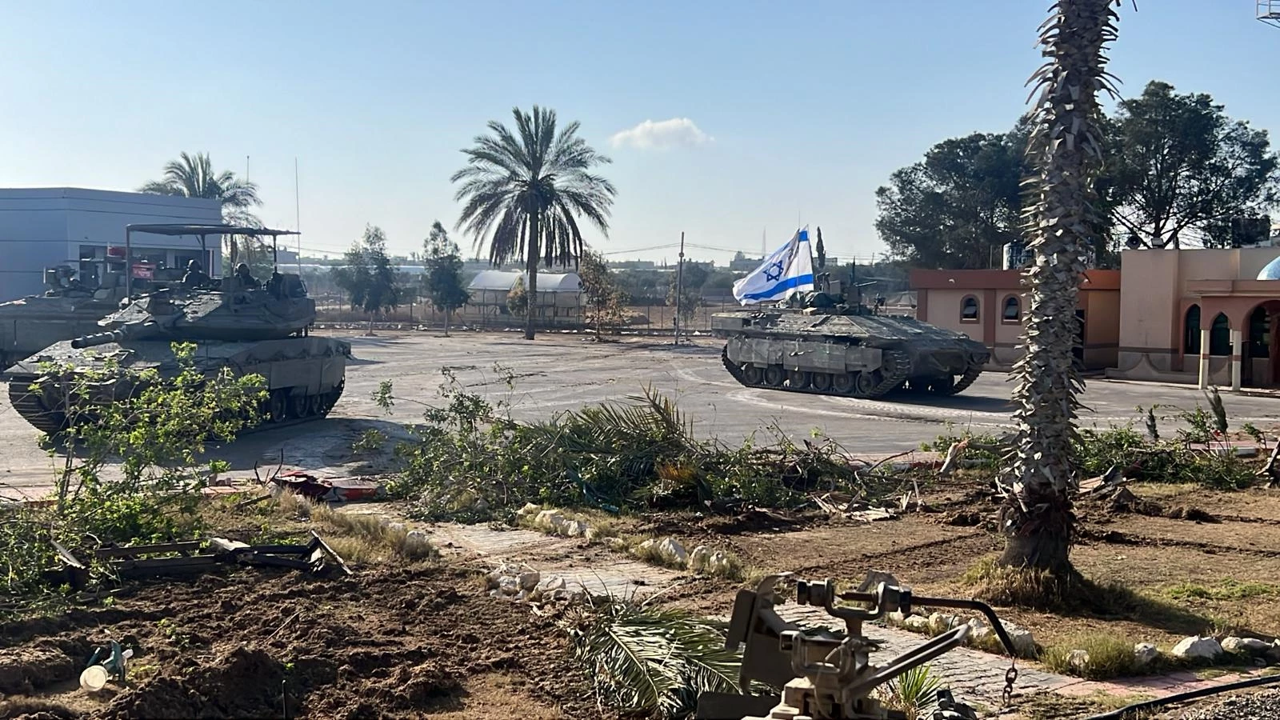
Israeli Merkava tanks at the Rafah Border Crossing

On 24 May, the United Nations said only 906 aid truckloads had reached Gaza since Israel's Rafah operation began. Israel bombed the Tel al-Sultan displacement camp in Rafah on 26 May, killing at least 45 people, allegedly including two senior Hamas officials. This provoked a skirmish between Egyptian and Israeli soldiers at the Gaza border in which one Egyptian soldier was killed. Less than 48 hours afterwards, another evacuation zone, the Al-Mawasi refugee camp, was bombed, killing at least 21. The IDF denied involvement.

On 6 June, Israel bombed a school in the Nuseirat refugee camp, killing dozens. Two days later, Israel attacked Nuseirat refugee camp which resulted in the rescue of four hostages and the deaths of 274 Palestinians. On 27 June, Israeli forces re-invaded the al-Shuja'iyya neighborhood. According to Middle East Monitor and ReliefWeb, between 4 July and 10 August, Israel attacked 21 schools in Gaza, killing 274 people.

=== Rafah, Khan Yunis, and general bombardment (July–September 2024) ===
UN analysis covering killed Palestinian civilians between November 2023 and April 2024.
1. Children (44.0%)
2. Women (26.0%)
3. Men (30.0%)

On 22 July, the IDF began a second invasion of Khan Yunis. Israel ordered the evacuation of the eastern part of Khan Yunis; the Gaza health ministry said that 73 people were killed during the first day of the attack. Footage from an Israeli drone surfaced showing the destruction of the Grand Mosque in Khan Yunis. A third, month-long battle ended on 30 August when the IDF withdrew its 98th battalion from Khan Yunis and Deir el-Balah, stating it had killed over 250 Palestinian militants.

On 13 July, at least 90 were killed and 300 injured in an Israeli strike on Al-Mawasi, and 22 were killed in an Israeli strike targeting people gathered to pray in the Al-Shati refugee camp. On 10 August, at least 80 Palestinians were killed in Israeli airstrikes on Al-Tabaeen school. The IDF said it had killed 200 militants and discovered dozens of weapons in Tel al-Sultan. On 10 September, Israeli missile strikes on a tent encampment in Al-Mawasi killed 19 to 40 people.

=== Continued operations throughout Gaza (October–December 2024) ===
In October, Israeli airstrikes on Shuhada al-Aqsa mosque in Deir el-Balah and a school in central Gaza killed at least 26 Palestinians and injured over 93. An Israeli strike on Rufaida school, which was serving as a shelter for displaced people in Deir el-Balah, killed at least 28 people and injured 54. On 8 October, the IDF began to encircle Jabalia camp, killing several Palestinian militants and civilians in air strikes and street battles. The IDF's operations in Jabalia continued for the rest of October. During that month and November, strikes on Jabalia killed hundreds of people.

The IDF was accused of blocking aid delivery to the Gaza Strip by allowing looting gangs to target aid convoys. On 16 November 98 out of 109 food trucks carrying UN aid from Kerem Shalom crossing were looted in Israeli-controlled areas of Gaza. The Abu Shabab clan, a rival of Hamas, was widely blamed for the attacks. On 1 December, the UN suspended its aid shipments through the crossing, blaming Israel for failing to "ensure safe conditions for delivering relief supplies."

On 16 October, IDF ground forces killed Hamas leader Yahya Sinwar in a shootout in Tal as-Sultan. Biden urged Israel to end the war after Sinwar's death.

==== Siege of northern Gaza ====
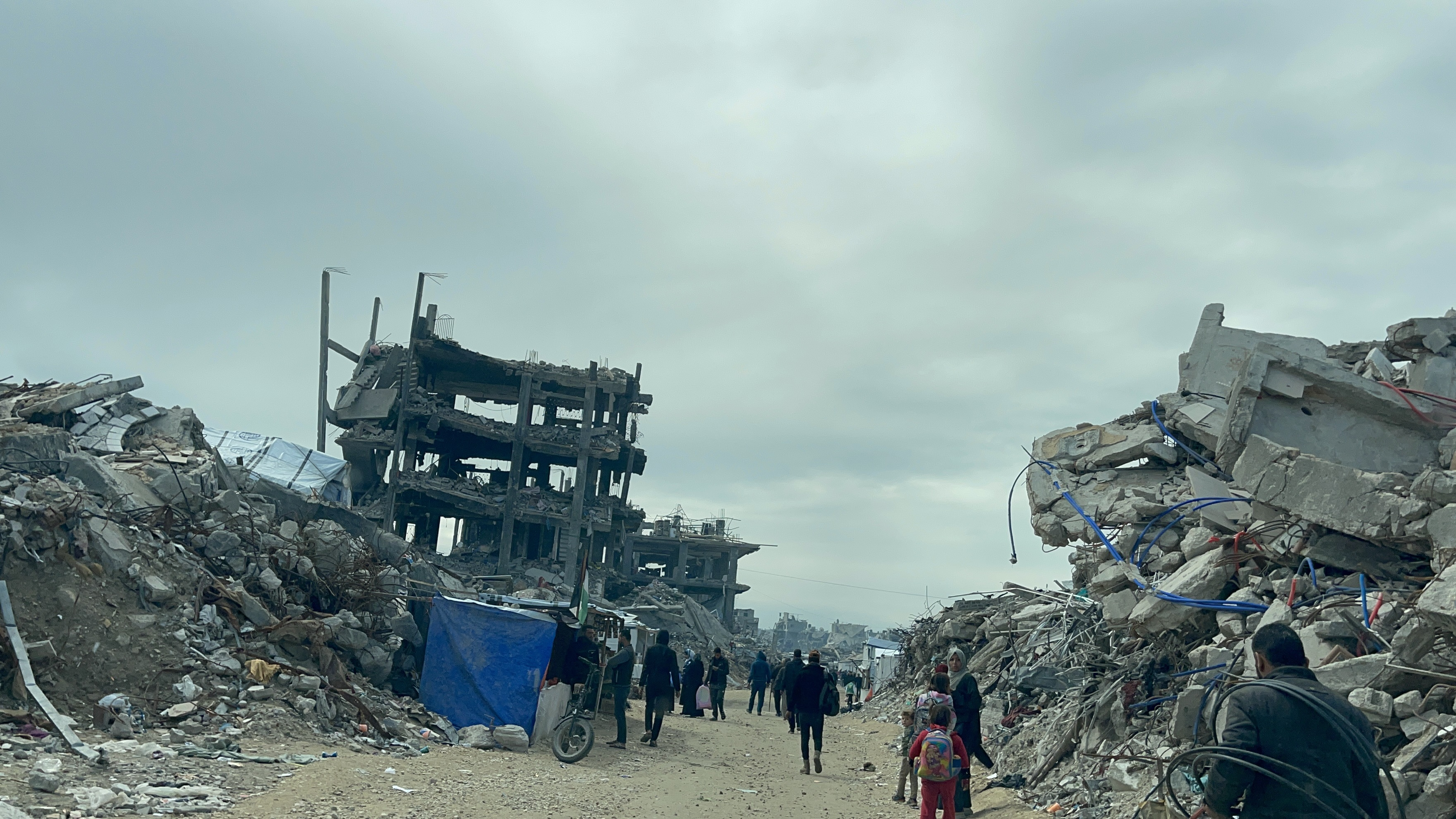
A street in northern Gaza pictured in the aftermath of the siege during the initial phase of the 2025 ceasefire

On 13 October, senior IDF officials told Haaretz that the government was not seeking to revive hostage talks and that political leadership was pushing for the annexation of parts of the Gaza Strip. In later October, Israel's siege of North Gaza intensified and daily aid shipments dropped significantly. Eyewitnesses reported the shelling of hospitals, razing of shelters, and abductions of men and boys, leading to speculation that Israel had decided to implement the "generals' plan": turning the northern Strip into a closed military zone and declaring all who remained to be combatants.

The IDF continued its encirclement of Jabalia by sending tanks to Beit Lahia and Beit Hanoun and issuing evacuation orders. On 24 October, an IDF attack destroyed at least 10 residential buildings in the Jabalia refugee camp. According to an assessment by Gaza Civil Defense, 150 people were killed or injured. Food aid to Gaza reached a new low in October at an average of 30 trucks per day, or less than 6% of the daily pre-war average. The UN warned that the situation had become "apocalyptic" and that "the entire Palestinian population in North Gaza is at imminent risk of dying from disease, famine and violence".

On 24 November, Israel issued new evacuation orders, triggering another round of displacements in Jabalia. UNRWA said in November that Israel had rejected nine attempts and obstructed an additional 82 to deliver aid to the 60,000 to 70,000 civilians remaining in north Gaza. On 5 December, Israeli Army Radio announced that 18,000 Palestinians had been evacuated from Beit Lahia.

=== Second ceasefire (January–March 2025) ===
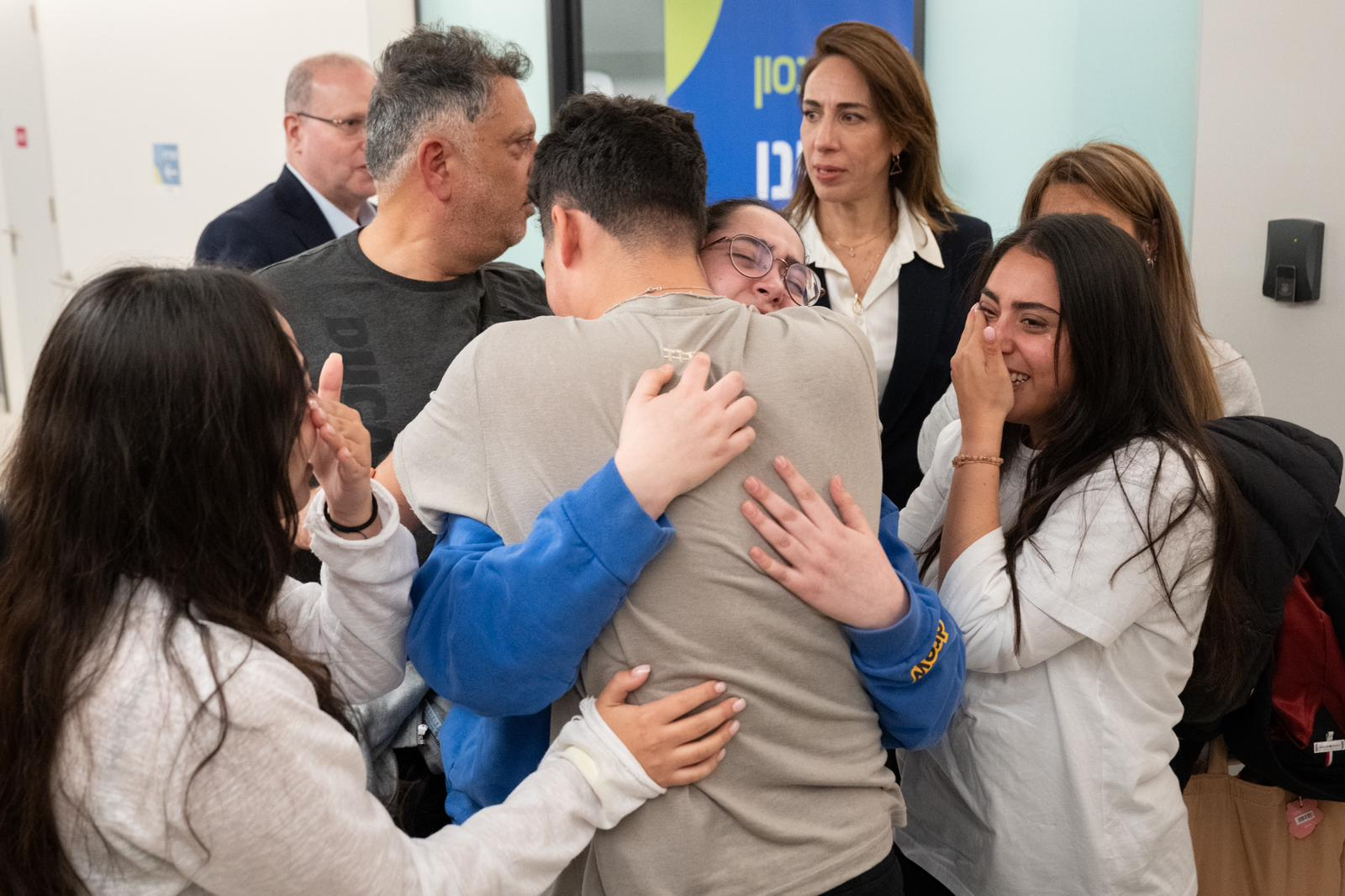
Liri Albag in the first meeting with her family after being released from Hamas captivity on 25 January 2025.

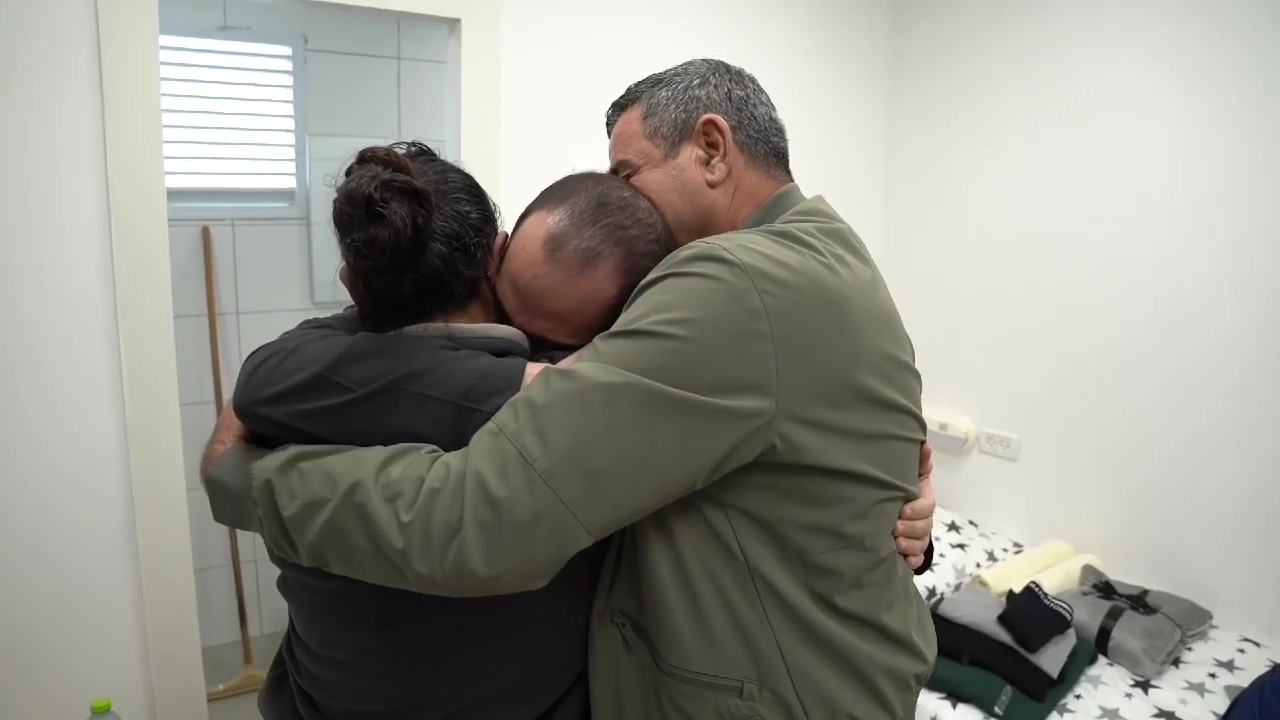
Yarden Bibas, whose wife and children were later returned dead, meets his father and sister for the first time after his release from Hamas captivity on 1 February 2025.

On 15 January 2025, an agreement was announced, through Qatari mediation, in which Hamas agreed to release a number of Israeli hostages held in the Gaza Strip in exchange for Hamas militants and other Palestinians held in Israeli prisons. The two parties also agreed to a ceasefire, which went into effect on the morning of 19 January 2025. On 27 January, tens of thousands of Palestinians began a mass return to northern Gaza after Israel opened a corridor for civilian movement. Hamas said that Israel had violated the terms of the ceasefire, and announced the suspension of the release of Israeli hostages on 10 February. After Netanyahu and US President Donald Trump threatened to restart fighting in Gaza, Hamas relented on 13 February, allowing the release of hostages to begin again two days later.

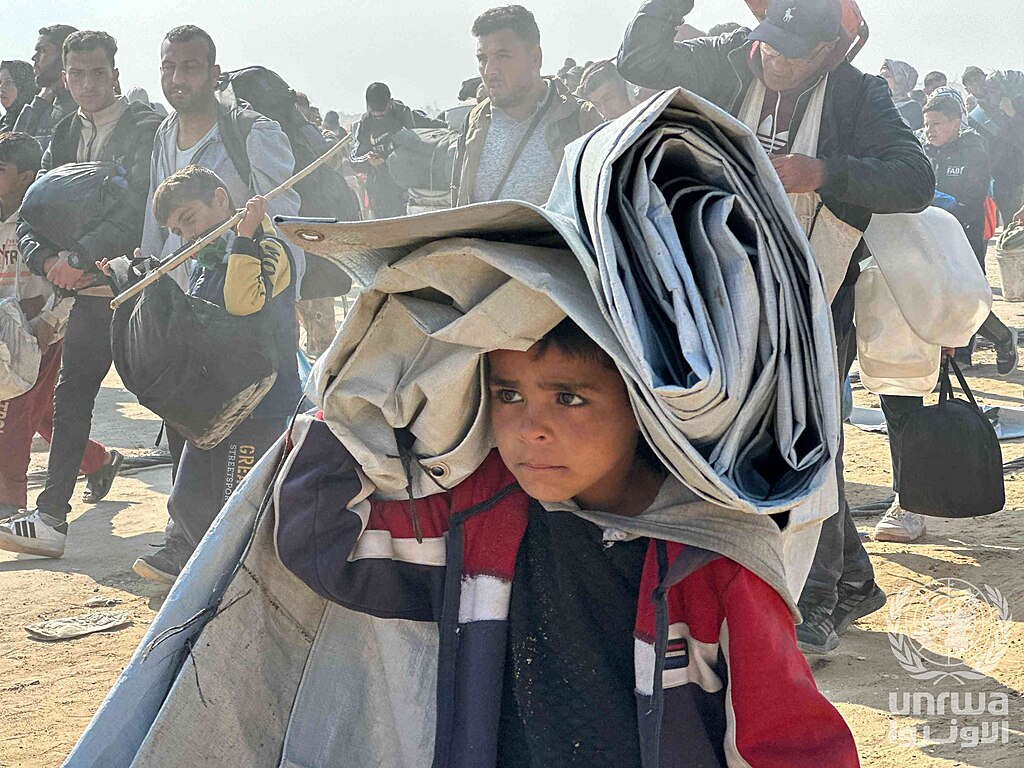
Return of displaced people via Al-Rasheed Street after ceasefire, January 2025, Gaza Strip

Negotiations for implementing the second phase of the ceasefire, intended to see the release of all remaining living hostages, the withdrawal of the Israeli military from Gaza and a permanent end to the war, were supposed to begin in February, but never happened. Israel endorsed a US plan to extend the Gaza truce for the Ramadan and Passover periods, but Hamas refused and demanded the second phase be implemented; Netanyahu ceased the entry of aid to Gaza the next day. This was condemned by Egypt as a violation of the ceasefire, which stipulated that phase one would automatically be extended as long as phase two negotiations were in progress. On 9 March, Israeli Energy Minister Eli Cohen ordered a halt to supply of Israeli electricity to Gaza.

In January, Hamas said it had recruited thousands of new fighters during the war. Then U.S. Secretary of State Antony Blinken estimated that "Hamas has recruited almost as many new militants as it has lost." Reuters reported the number of new recruits, based on U.S. intelligence, was 10,000 to 15,000.

=== Israeli attacks resume (March–April 2025) ===
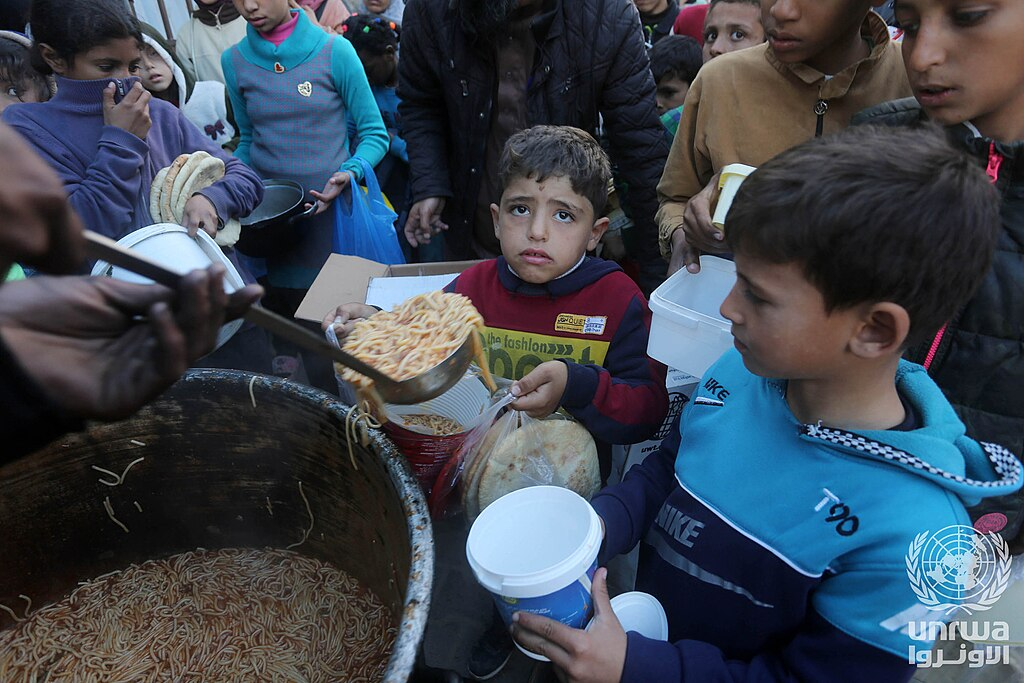
Displaced Palestinians receive food from charitable Tekiya during Ramadan in Deir el-Balah, Gaza Strip.

On 18 March, Israel ended the ceasefire by launching a surprise attack, killing over 400 people. Both sides blamed the other; internationally, the strikes stymied hopes for a lasting ceasefire. Israel chose to launch the attack on the day Netanyahu would testify in his corruption trial, forcing the legal proceedings to be postponed. Multiple senior members of Gaza's government and the Hamas political bureau were killed during this round of fighting, including Issam al-Da'alis and Salah al-Bardawil. Palestinian Islamic Jihad spokesman Abu Hamza was also killed. On 25 March, hundreds to thousands of Gazan Palestinians protested against Hamas and the war. The protests were caused by war-weariness and dissatisfaction with Hamas's abuse of civilians, and suppression of freedom of speech and of the press.

On 19 March, the IDF said that it had created a "partial buffer" and partially recaptured the center of the Netzarim Corridor. On 23 March, IDF troops fired on humanitarian vehicles, in southern Rafah, killing 15 medics; their bodies were found one week later. On 9 April, Israeli warplanes bombed a residential building in Shuja'iyya, killing over 35 Palestinians and wounding at least 70. On 12 April, the IDF announced that it had encircled Rafah, and planned to seize portions of it while ordering large-scale evacuations of its population.

=== Renewed Israeli offensive (May–September 2025) ===
In early May, Israel announced plans to expand the Gaza offensive and mobilized thousands of reservists. On 8 May, two Israeli airstrikes on the last restaurant in Gaza City and a simultaneous strike on a crowded nearby market killed at least 33 people. On 13 May, Israeli airstrikes struck the compound of the Gaza European Hospital in Khan Yunis, killing Mohammed Sinwar and Muhammad Shabana who were in underground tunnels. At least 143 people were killed in Gaza on 15 May, making it the deadliest day since the end of the ceasefire in March. The following day, Israel announced the launch of Operation Gideon's Chariots, a military offensive aimed at taking control of the entire Gaza Strip. The move was condemned by several of Israel's allies, a number of whom threatened sanctions. On 25 May, an Israeli airstrike on the Fahmi al-Jawjawi school in Daraj, Gaza City, killed at least 36 people and injured over 55. In late May a new militia in Gaza, the Popular Forces, began operating under the authority of the Abu Shabab clan in opposition to Hamas. Avigdor Lieberman accused Netanyahu and the Israeli government of funding and arming this militia.

On 27 May, the US-backed Gaza Humanitarian Foundation began operations in Tel al-Sultan to deliver humanitarian aid. As thousands of starving Palestinians overwhelmed the distribution center, Israeli forces fired into the crowd, killing ten and injuring at least 62 Palestinians. In a series of subsequent attacks on aid seekers, more than 1,300 were killed. On 30 June, an Israeli airstrike on al-Baqa cafeteria killed at least 41 Palestinians—including photojournalist Ismail Abu Hatab—and injured another 75. On 20 July, the IDF issued evacuation orders for the city of Deir al-Balah, where it had not launched a ground offensive since the start of the war. On the following day, Israeli forces advanced into the outskirts of Deir al-Balah as airstrikes hit the city.

In early August 2025, the Israeli security cabinet approved a plan to occupy Gaza City. The plan drew condemnation from the UN, the European Council president, and several countries. On 10 August, Israeli forces struck a press tent outside al-Shifa Hospital, killing six Al-Jazeera journalists including Anas Al-Sharif, bringing the number of journalists killed by Israel during the war to 192. On 20 August, Israel began the first stages of the offensive, calling up 60,000 reservists for the beginning of September. On 25 August, an Israeli double tap strike on Nasser Hospital in southern Gaza killed 22 people, including five journalists. Subsequently, Netanyahu said he "deeply regretted" the strike, describing it as a "mishap". On 9 September, Israel ordered the full evacuation of Gaza City, citing plans for intensified operation. Six days later, the IDF launched the full offensive, deploying units from two armored and infantry divisions.

=== Third ceasefire (September 2025 – present) ===
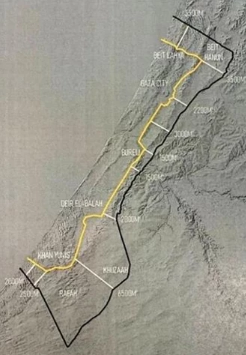
Gaza peace plan phase one withdrawal line shown in yellow (the "Yellow Line")

On 29 September, US President Donald Trump proposed a 20-point peace plan, which included the release of all hostages, an end to the war, the withdrawal of Israel and the disarmament of Hamas, and a temporary transitional government. Israel accepted the deal, as did Arab and Muslim states who urged Hamas to agree to it. On 3 October, under pressure from Trump, Hamas agreed to release all hostages, end the war, and hand over administration of the Gaza Strip, though it wanted to continue negotiating. The IDF halted the offensive in Gaza City on 4 October. Both sides agreed to phase one of the peace plan on 9 October. The following day, the IDF began a withdrawal from parts of the Gaza Strip; the ceasefire formally came into effect when this was completed at noon local time.

A peace summit on 13 October in Sharm El Sheikh was attended by representatives of over 30 countries and organizations. A prisoner exchange took place, with Hamas releasing the remaining 20 living Israeli hostages, while Israel released 1,718 Palestinian detainees held without charge and an additional 250 Palestinian prisoners convicted of crimes in Israeli courts.

Two IDF soldiers were killed in Rafah on 19 October; al-Qassam Brigades denied responsibility. Israel resumed bombardment of Gaza in response, killing at least 29 Palestinians before reaffirming the ceasefire the same day. On 28 October, one Israeli soldier was killed in Rafah; al-Qassam Brigades denied involvement. Netanyahu ordered Israeli forces to immediately conduct "powerful strikes" in Gaza: the attacks killed at least 104 people. The IDF said it targeted dozens of Hamas targets, including 21 commanders and militants who participated in the 7 October attacks. On 13 December, an Israeli attack west of Gaza City killed five people and injured at least 25 others. It targeted the al-Qassam Brigades commander Ra'ad Sa'ad, who was killed.

On 15 May 2026, Israeli strikes hit an apartment in Rimal area of Gaza City and a vehicle on a street in its vicinity, killing Izz al-Din al-Haddad, the leader of Hamas in the Gaza Strip. Medics in Gaza said seven people were killed and at least 50 others were wounded. An Israeli strike hit a building in Rimal area of Gaza City on 26 May, killing three people including Mohammed Odeh, who had succeeded al-Haddad.

On 31 July, Trump said that his Board of Peace had reached an agreement to disarm Hamas and other militant organisations in Gaza. Hamas leader Ghazi Hamad stated that disarmament would be dependent on Israel's withdrawal from Gaza and progress on reconstruction, and that Hamas will not implement any part of the agreement unless Israeli forces fulfilled the terms of the agreement. The al-Quds Brigades agreed to the disarmament plan on 2 August. Israel's political echelon ordered the IDF not to launch strikes in Gaza without the authorization of IDF chief of staff Lt. Gen. Eyal Zamir, following a US request to limit operations in Gaza. In the run up to the 2026 Israeli elections, Netanyahu rejected the Board of Peace agreement. On 3 October, at least five people were killed in an Israeli strike that hit an apartment in Gaza City. The IDF stated that the de facto leader of Hamas in the Gaza Strip, Ali al-Amoudi was targeted in the strike. Two days later, Hamas announced that al-Amoudi survived the assassination attempt.

== Impact ==
=== Scale of destruction ===
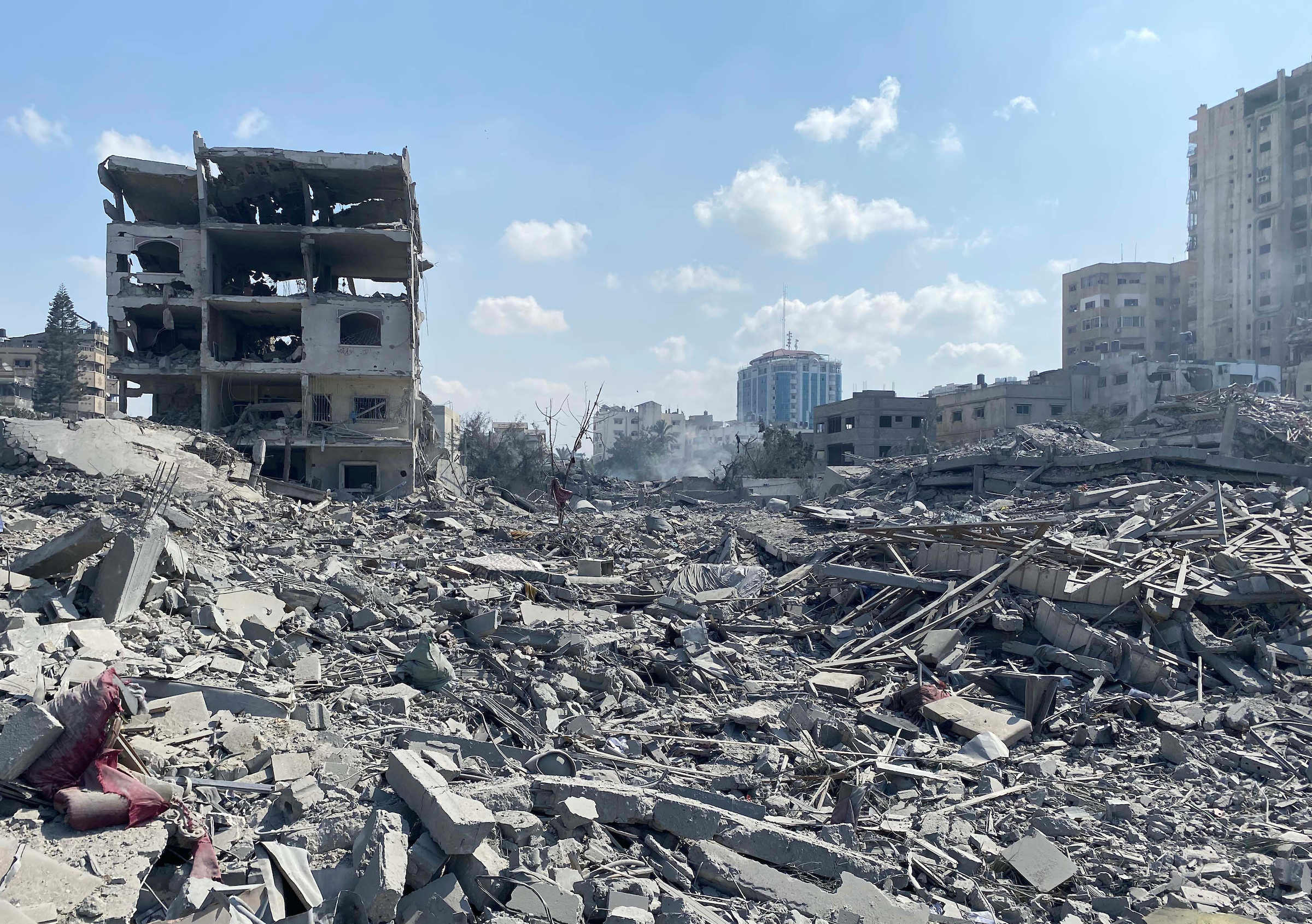
Rimal in Gaza City following an Israeli airstrike, 10 October 2023

The scale and pace of destruction and damage of buildings in the Gaza Strip ranks among the most severe in modern history, surpassing the level of destruction of Dresden and London during World War II and approaching that of Hamburg, and included the destruction of apartment buildings, hospitals, schools, religious sites, factories, shopping centers, and municipal infrastructure. As of January 2024, researchers at Oregon State University and the City University of New York estimated that 50–62% of buildings in the Gaza Strip had been damaged or destroyed. (Note: In northern Gaza, including Gaza City, the number of buildings damaged or destroyed is as high as 80 percent.) (Note: In October 2024, The New York Times estimated 168,000 buildings in Gaza had been damaged or destroyed.) The 29,000 munitions Israel had dropped on Gaza in three months exceeded the amount (3,678) dropped by the US between 2004 and 2010 after its invasion of Iraq. According to satellite analyses, 68% of roads, 70% of greenhouses, and nearly 70% of tree crops have been damaged or destroyed. After a year, the UN estimates that 42m tonnes of rubble clutter the Strip; clearing and rebuilding might take 80 years and cost over $80bn.

The Guardian reported that the scale of destruction has led international legal experts to raise the concept of domicide, which it describes as "the mass destruction of dwellings to make [a] territory uninhabitable". The term urbicide has also been used to refer to the destruction of Gazan cities and their institutions. In October 2024, Forensic Architecture published a map platform detailing Israel's campaign in Gaza titled "A Cartography of Genocide", accompanied by a report that concludes that "Israel's military campaign in Gaza is organised, systematic, and intended to destroy conditions of life and life-sustaining infrastructure". Psychologist Daniel Bar-Tal attributed the scale of destruction in Gaza to the trauma and perceived existential threat produced by the October 7 Hamas attack and deterrence-oriented military objectives.

In October 2026, former UNHCR Special Envoy Angelina Jolie drew attention to the scale of destruction in Gaza by sharing before-and-after satellite images on Instagram, comparing areas near Al-Qadisiyah School in Rafah, Khan Yunis, and Omar Mukhtar Street in Gaza City before the war with their appearance in summer 2026. Citing UN satellite analysis, she noted that as of June 2026, 82% of structures in Gaza had been damaged, with roughly two-thirds of those assessed as destroyed. She further pointed to humanitarian figures indicating that 1.98 million people—94% of Gaza's population—required shelter assistance and essential items as winter approached. Jolie stated that aid and shelter materials continued to face restrictions and delays, and called for shelter, humanitarian assistance, and medical supplies to reach civilians, along with conditions that would allow Palestinians to rebuild their homes, schools, hospitals, and communities.

=== Humanitarian crisis ===
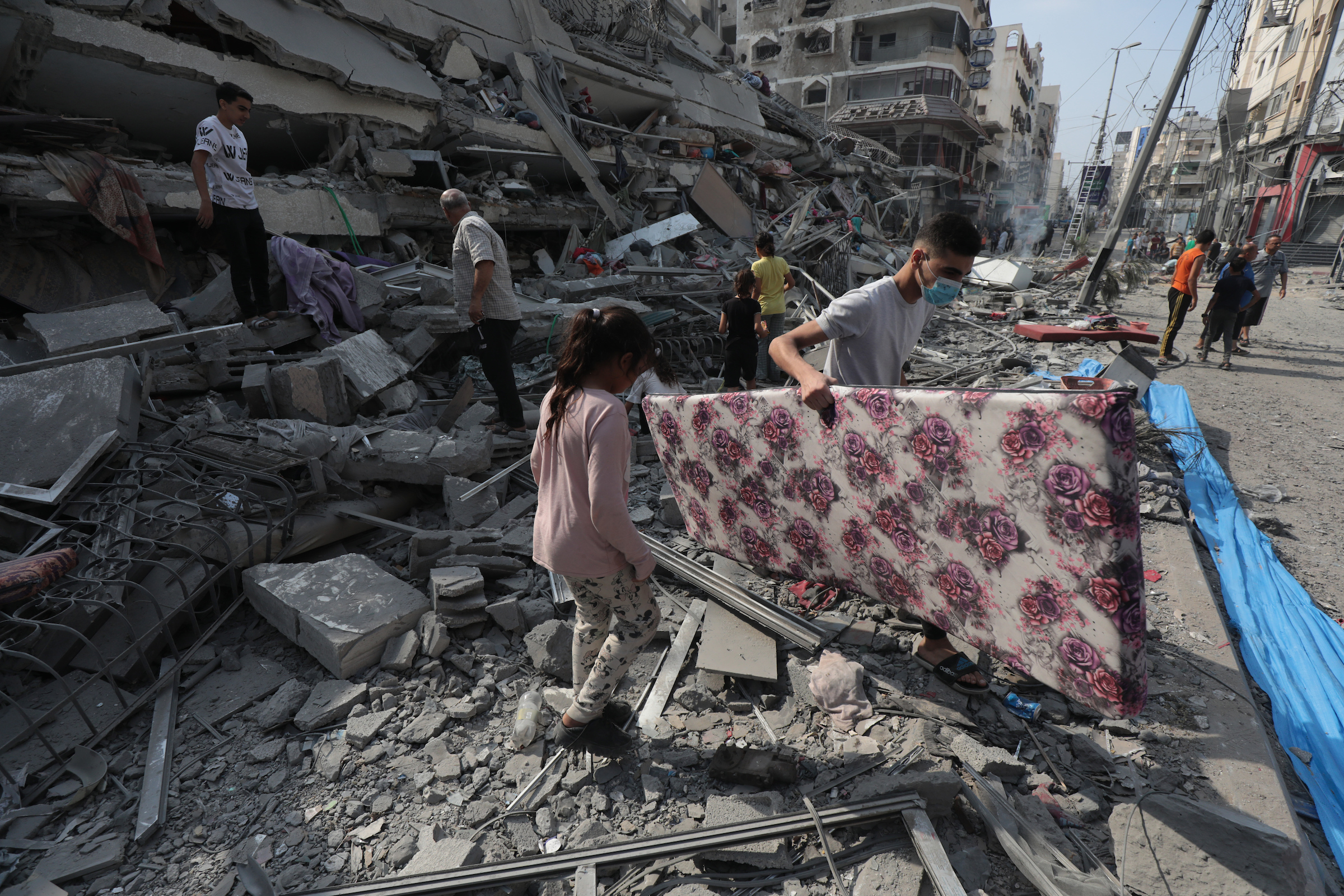
Residents inspect the ruins of an apartment in Gaza destroyed by Israeli airstrikes

The Gaza Strip is experiencing a humanitarian crisis and a healthcare collapse as a result of the war. At the start of the war, Israel tightened its blockade, resulting in significant shortages of fuel, food, medication, water, and essential medical supplies. This siege resulted in a 90% drop in electricity availability, impacting hospital power supplies, sewage plants, and shutting down the desalination plants that provide drinking water. In July 2024, available water was 4.74 litres per person per day, just under a third of the recommended minimum in emergencies. Doctors warned of disease outbreaks spreading due to overcrowded hospitals. A polio epidemic was the target of mostly-successful vaccination campaigns.

Heavy bombardment by Israeli airstrikes caused catastrophic damage to Gaza's infrastructure, further deepening the crisis. Direct attacks on telecommunications infrastructure by Israel, electricity blockades, and fuel shortages caused the near-total collapse of Gaza's largest cell network providers. Lack of internet access has obstructed Gazan citizens from communicating with loved ones, learning of IDF operations, and identifying both the areas most exposed to bombing and possible escape routes. The blackouts impeded emergency services, making it harder to locate and access the time-critical injured, and have impeded humanitarian agencies and journalists.

In May 2025, Donald Trump acknowledged starvation in Gaza and backed the promoted Gaza Humanitarian Foundation to distribute food through hubs run by private contractors and protected by Israeli soldiers. International aid agencies warned that the plans weaponized humanitarian aid and would not be able to meet the scale of aid that was required. UN humanitarian representatives Cindy McCain and Tom Fletcher noted that only about 100 trucks a day were getting through, compared to more that 600 trucks a day before the blockade.

Trump said Gaza is experiencing "real starvation", while Netanyahu blamed Hamas. In August 2025, an IPC analysis confirmed famine, or IPC Phase 5, in some parts of Gaza including Gaza City. This analysis predicted that a further 640,000 people would face Phase 5 conditions by September 2025. Coordinator of Government Activities in the Territories issued a counter-report which it said refuted the contents of the IPC brief. On 19 December 2025, the IPC released a report stating that famine conditions in Gaza no longer existed following improved food deliveries after the ceasefire, though the situation remained "fragile".

=== Mass detention ===
Israel has increased its administrative detention of Palestinians and Palestinian citizens of Israel since the start of the war. Administrative detention was already at a 20-year high before October 2023. More than 11,000 Palestinians are held in Israeli jails, not counting detainees taken from Gaza during the war. At least 60 Palestinians have died in Israeli detention since 7 October. They are held without charge or trial, which violates international law.

In December 2023, a military base at Sde Teiman in the Negev Desert was converted to a detention camp by the IDF. Whistleblowers and detainees reported torture of Palestinian detainees at the camp, as well as amputations of limbs due to injuries sustained from handcuffing, medical neglect, arbitrary punishment and sexual abuse. Prisoners have been coerced to confess that they are members of Hamas. After conditions in the camp came to light in May 2024, the Supreme Court of Israel held a hearing and the IDF began transferring 1,200 of the prisoners to Ofer Prison. Detainees have reported severe instances of violence during transfers between prisons. In July, ten soldiers "suspected of the serious sexual abuse" of a Palestinian detainee were arrested at Sde Teiman. In protest, Israeli national security minister Itamar Ben-Gvir and other supporters of the arrested soldiers stormed both Sde Teiman and Beit Lid, where the soldiers were being held.

Several Palestinian healthcare workers have been abducted from Gaza hospitals during sieges by Israeli forces. As of February 2025, at least 160 healthcare workers from Gaza were believed to be held in detention by Israel, with another 24 missing after being taken from hospitals in Gaza. For example, in December 2024, Israeli forces abducted Hussam Abu Safiya, the director of Kamal Adwan Hospital, and 57 of the hospital's staff.

=== Economic impact ===
The war cost Israel 168 billion shekels (more than US$50 billion) as of September 2025. By September 2024 the US provided $14.5 billion in aid, part of the $22.76 billion the US had allocated for military assistance. (Note: A conservative estimate for US funding for Israel's military operations and related US operations in the area sets the figure for the fiscal year between 7 October and 30 September at $22.76 billion.) As early as 9 November 2023, the Bank of Israel reported that the drop in labor supply caused by the war was costing the Israeli economy $600 million a week, or 6% of weekly GDP. The bank also stated that the estimate did not include damage caused by the absence of Palestinian and foreign workers. In the final quarter of 2023, the Israeli economy shrank by 5.2% quarter-to-quarter due to labor shortages in construction and from the mobilization of 300,000 reservists.

According to UNCTAD's 2025 report, prolonged restrictions on movement, coupled with the war in October 2023, have resulted in significant long-term devastation in both Gaza and the West Bank. The per capita GDP has plummeted to $161 annually and unemployment rates have soared to 80 percent. It has been calculated that the carbon cost in terms of climate impact of rebuilding Gaza would exceed the annual greenhouse emissions of 135 countries.

The flow of commercial goods into Gaza stopped in October 2026, greatly affecting supplies for the Gazan population. According to the Israeli authorities, the stoppage resulted from of a tax dispute between Gazan merchants and Hamas: the merchants halted coordination with it due to a fee of 10,000 shekels per truck levied by Hamas and a request for 30% of sales in cash. Hamas subsequently said that the fee was a voluntary payment by wealthy Gazans. Trucks carrying humanitarian aid and trucks carrying commercial goods from Egypt were still entering Gaza.

=== Environmental impact ===
There has been extensive environmental damage caused by the Gaza war, By March 2024, nearly half of the farmland in Gaza had been destroyed, and by the following January 80% of the tree cover had been destroyed.

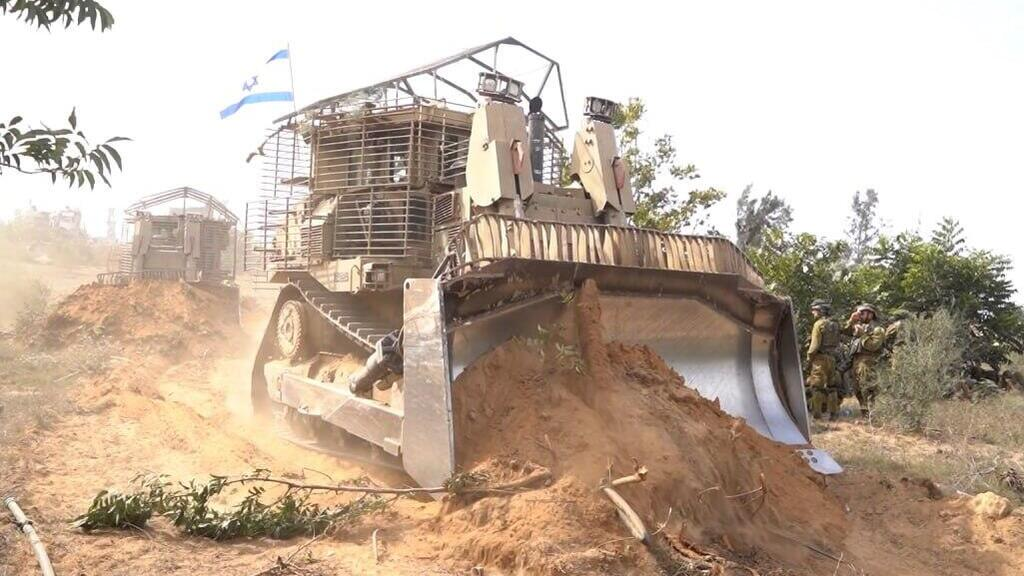
IDF bulldozer clearing trees in Gaza in October 2023

Israeli bombardment and the blockade have led to a total collapse of Gaza's civil infrastructure, including sewage treatment, waste disposal, water management, and fuel supplies. Water has been polluted by 130,000 cubic metres of sewage being discharged into the sea every day due to Israel cutting off fuel supplies. Groundwater has been contaminated by toxins and munitions and air has been polluted by smoke and particulates from bombing. Soils have been degraded by uprooting trees and contaminated by toxins, munitions, heavy bombing and demolitions. Bombing by the Israeli army has created 50 million tonnes of debris and hazardous material, much of which contains human remains and tens of thousands of bombs. In June 2024, northern Gaza was described as a "wasteland", unable to sustain life. The size of the damage have led to calls by the research group Forensic Architecture at Goldsmiths, University of London, and the Palestinian Environmental NGOs Network for the Israeli Government to be investigated for the Rome Statute war crime of ecocide for "widespread, long-term and severe damage to the natural environment".

During the first nine months of war alone, 146 km^{2} (56 sq mi) of vegetation in northern Israel and 8 square kilometers along the Gaza border was burned mostly by rocket fire from Gaza and Lebanon. This does not include the impact from drones and anti-tank guided missiles shot from Lebanon, nor fire from Yemen and Iraq. The fires increased air pollution accounting for 44% of carbon monoxide emissions in Israel during the period, 13% of fine particulate matter, 12% of particulate matter, 7% of non-methane volatile organic compounds, and 1% of emissions from ammonia, anitrogen and sulfur oxides. The is 5 times more than the average area burned annually over the past decade in the Galilee and the Golan Heights. Before the war, multiple fires were sparked by incendiary balloons from the Gaza Strip. Due to the war, nine of 40 large companies close to the northern and Gaza borders failed to report their emissions as they are required by law. In the Orot Rabin power station the war led to operational changes creating a 24% increase in emissions of large particulate matter in 2023 compared to 2022. A crane collapse in southern Ashdod last year also contributed to the rise. In the Rutenberg power plant the war led to release of 728 tons of nitrogen oxides into the atmosphere, and in the Ashdod oil refinery 290 tons sulfur oxides. By the end of 2024, 340 km^{2} (130 sq mi) of woodland were burned mostly by Hezbollah rockets. Considering agricultural land, in the southern part of the western Negev, crops were burnt. The war with Hezbollah burned a larger area - about 20,000 dunams. Wildlife also suffered greatly. Soil became heavily degraded.

== Casualties ==
Event	Total	Civilians		Children	
Event	Total	Total	%	Total	%
October 7 attacks	1,195	828	69.2% (Note: Calculated from referenced table data (828/1,195).)	36	3.01% (Note: Calculated from referenced table data (36/1,195).)
Israeli invasion and bombing of Gaza	73,922	~59,031 (Note: Calculated from referenced table data (80% of 73,922).)	~80%	21,638	29.27% (Note: Calculated from referenced table data (21,638/73,922).)
Israeli attacks in the West Bank	1,209			254	21.01% (Note: Calculated from referenced table data (254/1,209).)

As of 27 September 2026, at least 77,271 people (75,225+ Palestinians (Note: Calculated from referenced table data (74,016+1,209).) and 2,046+ Israelis) have been reported killed in the Gaza war (in all of Israel-Palestine) according to the Gaza Health Ministry (GHM) and Israeli Ministry of Foreign Affairs, including 270 journalists and media workers, 120 academics, and over 560 humanitarian aid workers, a number that includes 393 employees of UNRWA. A study by OHCHR found that 70% of the Palestinians killed in residential buildings or similar housing were women and children.

A February 2025 analysis of deaths in Gaza between October 2023 and 30 June 2024 concluded that trauma-related deaths were undercounted by the GHM by 41% during this period. It estimated that there had been 64,260 deaths from traumatic injury by June 2024, likely exceeding 70,000 by October 2024, with 59.1% of them being women, children and the elderly. The findings do not include non-trauma-related deaths. A comparable estimate up to May 2025 would be 93,000 (77,000 to 109,000), representing 4–5% of Gaza's pre-war population. Another casualty analysis published in February 2026 estimated 75,200 violent deaths up to 5 January 2025 – 34.7% higher than the GHM's casualty count at the time, and 56.2% women, children, and elderly individuals. The analysis estimated 8,540 excess non-violent deaths. An October 2025 analysis estimated 78,318 violent deaths (70,614 to 87,504) up to 31 December 2024, with a comparable estimate of between 100,000 and 126,000 violent deaths by November 2025.

A May 2025 investigation found that a classified IDF database listed 8,900 Palestinian fighters as dead or likely dead, or 17% of the 53,000 death toll at the time, which if correct would indicate that 83% of the dead were civilians—among conflicts since 1989, only the Srebrenica massacre (though not the Bosnian war overall), the siege of Mariupol, and the Rwandan genocide have seen a higher rate of civilian casualties. In response, the IDF said that the numbers in the article are incorrect.

A survey by the Palestinian Center for Policy and Survey Research (PCPSR) reported showed over 60% of Gazans have lost family members since the war began. Thousands of more dead bodies are thought to be under the rubble of destroyed buildings. The number of injured is greater than 100,000; United Nations agencies have reported that Gaza is now home to the highest number of child amputees per capita in the world.

The majority of casualties have been in the Gaza Strip. The GHM total casualty count does not distinguish Palestinian deaths by Israeli attacks from those by other means, like friendly fire, and describes all casualties as victims of "Israeli aggression". On 3 March 2026, the GHM published the names, gender and birth date of 72,004 individual Palestinians whose identities were confirmed and continues to attempt to identify all casualties.

The October 7 attacks on Israel killed 1,195 people, including 815 civilians. Casualties have also occurred in other parts of Israel, as well as in southern Lebanon, Syria, Yemen, and Iran. As reported by the Defense Ministry, the total number of Israeli fatalities as of October 2025 is 1,152. This figure encompasses soldiers, police personnel, Shin Bet operatives, and civilian security officials who died on duty, as well as those who succumbed to accidents, illness, or suicide. Notably, around 42% of the deceased were individuals under the age of 21. According to the Israeli Ministry of Defense's Rehabilitation Division, about 1,000 soldiers are wounded every month. In August 2024, the ministry predicted that it would have to account for 100,000 disabled IDF veterans by 2030 due to the war. An August 2025 report indicated that the rise in suicides among IDF soldiers was due to psychological trauma resulting from the prolonged conflict.

Since the establishment of a ceasefire brokered by the United States, more than 1,600 Palestinians in Gaza have died; meanwhile, the total number of casualties from October 7, 2023, to November 2026 has reached over 74,000.

== War crimes ==
In the aftermath of the October 7 attack, a UN Commission to the Israel–Palestine conflict stated that there is "clear evidence that war crimes may have been committed". The International Criminal Court (ICC) noted that its mandate to investigate allegations of war crimes in Palestine extended to the current conflict. On 21 November, the ICC issued arrest warrants for Netanyahu, Gallant, and Hamas leader Mohammed Deif, for alleged war crimes and crimes against humanity during the war; Deif's arrest warrant was cancelled after his death.

In June 2024, the UN commission published a report covering the war from 7 October to 31 December 2023. The report found that Hamas and six other Palestinian groups were responsible for the war crimes of intentionally directing attacks against civilians, murder or willful killing, torture, inhuman or cruel treatment, destroying or seizing property, outrages upon personal dignity, and taking hostages, including children. The commission also concluded that Israeli authorities were responsible for the war crimes of starvation as a method of warfare, murder or willful killing, intentionally directing attacks against civilians and civilian objects, forcible transfer, sexual violence, torture and inhuman or cruel treatment, arbitrary detention and outrages upon personal dignity. It also found that Israel had committed crimes against humanity, including carrying out the extermination of Palestinians and gender persecution targeting Palestinian men and boys. The commission said that they had submitted 7,000 pieces of evidence of crimes committed by Israel and Hamas to the ICC.

In another report published in October 2024, the commission accused the IDF of war crimes through deliberately killing and torturing medical personnel, targeting medical vehicles, and restricting patients from leaving Gaza. The report also found that thousands of Palestinian prisoners, many arbitrarily detained, faced widespread abuse, including violence, rape and sexual assault, and torture, and highlighted that resulting deaths constituted war crimes and violations of the right to life. Israel refused to cooperate with the investigation, contending that it had an "anti-Israel" bias. In July 2024, five IDF soldiers gang raped a Palestinian detainee from Gaza, which was partially caught on cctv. Due to "exceptional circumstances", the charges for the soldiers were dropped. The victim was stabbed in the rectum, and suffered severe injuries to the lungs and ribs.

== Genocide ==
In December 2023, the government of South Africa instituted proceedings, South Africa v. Israel, against Israel at the International Court of Justice (ICJ), alleging a violation of the Genocide Convention. In January 2024, the court ordered Israel to take all measures within its power to prevent the commission of acts of genocide, to prevent and punish incitement to genocide, and to allow basic humanitarian service, aid and supplies into Gaza. Israel did not fully comply with the court's orders.

In December 2024, Amnesty International concluded that Israel was committing genocide against Palestinians in the Gaza Strip; Human Rights Watch also concluded that month that Israel is responsible for the crime of genocide through deprivation of safe water and sanitation. In March 2025, the UN Commission found that Israel's attacks on women's healthcare facilities in Gaza amounted to genocidal acts; Israeli prime minister Benjamin Netanyahu condemned the report as "false and absurd", accusing the UN Human Rights Council of being anti-Israel and anti-Semitic. In July 2025, Israeli human rights groups B'Tselem and Physicians for Human Rights–Israel released reports calling Israel's campaign in Gaza a genocide.

On 16 September 2025, the UN Commission of Inquiry on the Occupied Palestinian Territory concluded that Israel had committed genocide against Palestinians in Gaza, and that top Israeli officials including Netanyahu, Gallant, and Herzog had incited these acts. The report said that four of the five acts of genocide have been committed, as defined under the 1948 Genocide Convention. Israel rejected the report as distorted and false, and called for the abolition of the Commission.

The genocide has also been recognized by a United Nations special committee and the International Association of Genocide Scholars, numerous genocide studies and international law scholars, and other experts. (Note: Attributed to multiple references:)

A UN report from November 2026 accused Israel of committing war crimes and crimes against humanity in the occupied West Bank, including extermination, torture, and sexual assault. It also further stated that the Israeli government and its armed forces are perpetrating a genocide in Gaza, despite a ceasefire brokered by the United States. These findings, released ahead of the 2026 Israeli legislative election, point to a worsening situation since the October 7 attacks. The report notes that Israeli military actions and settler violence systematically targeted civilians in the West Bank.

== Spillover ==
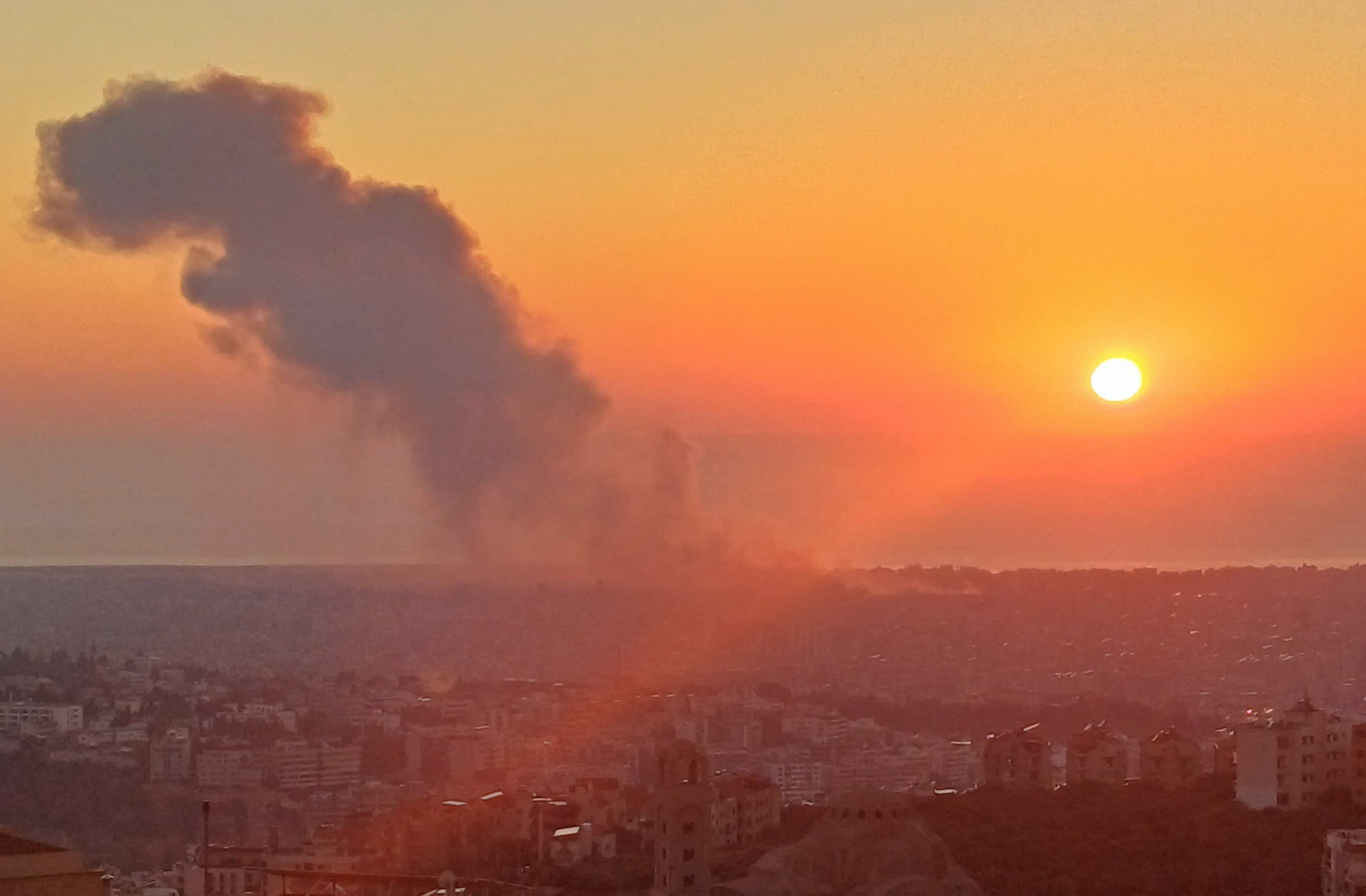
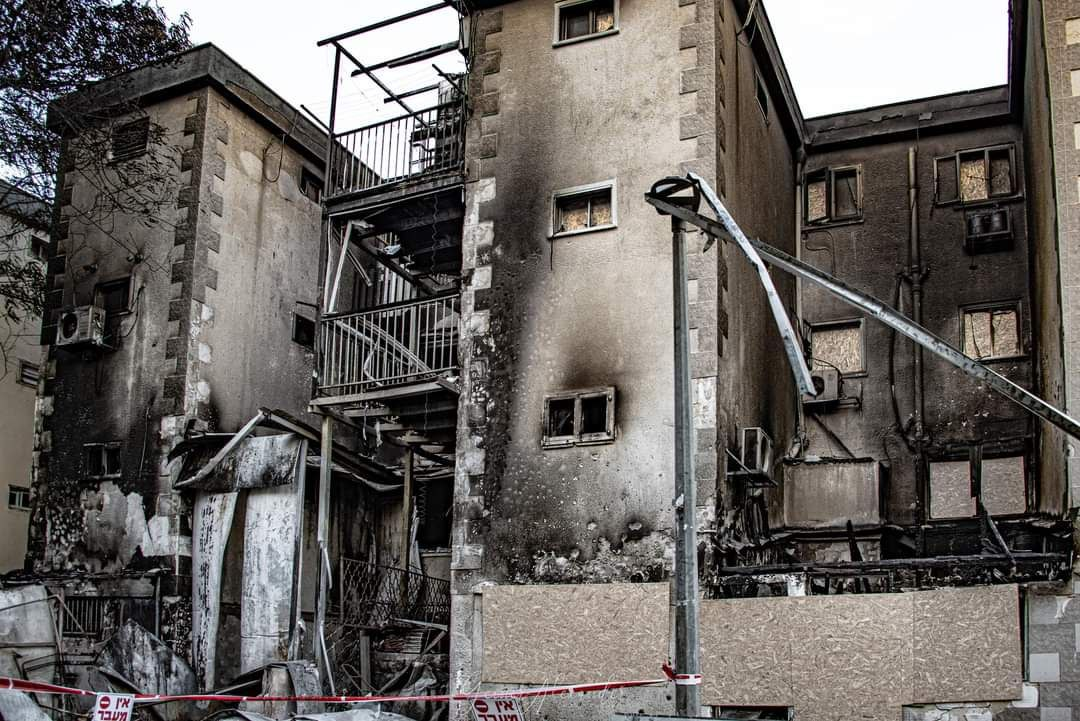
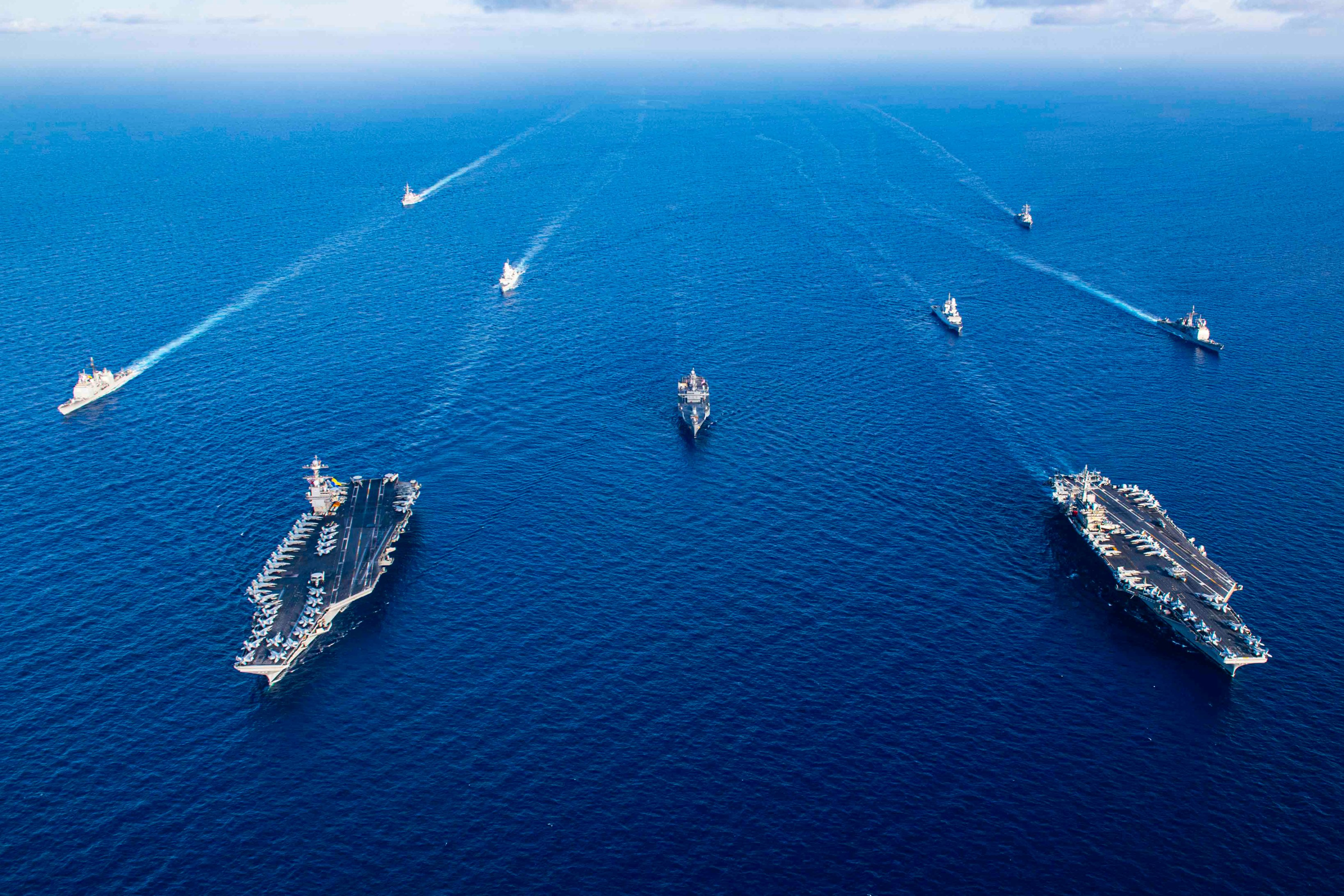
- Rising smoke after the Israel strike on Hezbollah headquarters
- A damaged building in Kiryat Shmona, northern Israel
- Two United States carrier strike groups in the Mediterranean Sea.

The war's spillover resulted in a major escalation of existing tensions between Israel and Iran, with groups in the Axis of Resistance launching attacks on American military bases, and the Yemeni Houthi movement attacking commercial vessels in the Red Sea and incurring a US-led military operation. Hezbollah in southern Lebanon and the Houthi movement launched attacks against Israel shortly after the start of the war. Iranian-backed militias in Iraq and Syria have also traded attacks with the US and IDF.

Israel has bombed targets in and around Damascus throughout the war, with an attack on the Iranian embassy in Damascus on 1 April 2024 leading to a series of retaliatory airstrikes on Israel. On 31 July, Hamas political leader Ismail Haniyeh was assassinated in Tehran, and on 1 October, Iran fired approximately 200 missiles at Israel.

By the end of 2024, a year-long exchange of strikes between Israel and Hezbollah escalated into an Israeli invasion of Lebanon, before it was paused after a ceasefire. In February 2025, Israel largely withdrew but maintained five military outposts on highlands in Southern Lebanon, against Lebanon's wishes. The crisis has also seen the fall of the Assad regime and an ongoing Israeli invasion of Syria. Israeli defense minister Israel Katz in April 2025 declared that Israeli forces would indefinitely remain in "security zones" that they "cleared and seized" in Gaza, Lebanon and Syria.

On 13 June 2025, the Twelve-Day War began after Israel launched large-scale attacks against targets in several areas in Iran, killing Iran's top military leadership, including Islamic Revolutionary Guard Corps (IRGC) commander Hossein Salami, Iranian Armed Forces Chief of Staff Major General Mohammad Bagheri, and nuclear scientists Fereydoon Abbasi and Mohammad Mehdi Tehranchi were killed in the attacks, according to Iranian state media. The United States joined Israel in bombing Iran on 22 June 2025, saying to have destroyed several nuclear sites.

On 9 September 2025, Israel bombed the Hamas headquarters in Qatar, reportedly targeting several members of the Hamas temporary committee, including Khalil al-Hayya, Khaled Mashal, Muhammad Ismail Darwish, Mousa Abu Marzook, and Zaher Jabarin. The attack failed to assassinate the Hamas leadership in Qatar. The stated Israeli reason for the bombing was the Ramot Junction shooting in East Jerusalem the day prior.

In February 2026, the United States and Israel launched a major war on Iran.

=== West Bank and Israel ===
West Bank sector of war West Bank Palestinian enclaves (Areas A & B) West Bank under Israeli control (Area C) Israeli-annexed East Jerusalem

Violence in the West Bank increased from the beginning of the war, with more than 607 Palestinians and over 25 Israelis killed by August 2024. At the same time, Israeli settler violence further increased to around 1,270 attacks, against 856 for all of 2022. In the weeks after the 7 October attack, about 1,000 Palestinians were forcibly displaced by settlers and Israeli forces, and six Palestinian communities were abandoned. On 19 October, more than 60 Hamas members were arrested and 13 people were killed in overnight Israeli raids across the West Bank.

In July 2024, Israeli authorities approved the seizure of 12.7 square kilometers in the West Bank, the largest single land seizure since the 1993 Oslo accords. Israeli authorities also approved plans for almost 5,300 new houses in occupied West Bank. By this point, Israeli land seizures exceeded the combined total of the previous 20 years. The following month, the Israeli government approved new settlements in the area.

On 7 August, Wafa reported that Israeli forces destroyed the regional headquarters of Fatah in the Balata Camp. On 28 August, Israel launched the largest military operation into the northern West Bank in more than 20 years. Israeli Foreign Minister Israel Katz called the operation a "full-fledged war". Israeli forces carried out simultaneous operations in Jenin, Tubas, Nablus, Ramallah and Tulkarm. The IDF classified the West Bank as a "combat zone" in early September, viewing it as the second most important front in the war. Yoav Gallant said that Israel was "mowing the lawn" with its West Bank operations, but that it would eventually need to "pull out the roots". On 6 September, Turkish-American protestor Ayşenur Eygi was killed by an Israeli sniper at a demonstration near Nablus.

On 3 October, an Israeli airstrike in Tulkarm Camp killed at least 20 people. On 13 November, Israeli finance minister Bezalel Smotrich said that with Trump's victory in the 2024 United States presidential election, Israel was "a step away" from "sovereignty in Judea and Samaria," with later comments by the future US ambassador to Israel corroborating the possibility of annexation of the West Bank. On 21 January 2025, the IDF launched a major raid in the West Bank. On 8 September, two Hamas militants opened fire inside a bus, killing six Israelis and injuring 21 in East Jerusalem.

On 30 November 2023, two Palestinian gunmen killed three and wounded 11 Israeli civilians at a bus stop on the Givat Shaul Interchange in Jerusalem. Hamas claimed responsibility. On 16 February 2024, a Palestinian gunman shot and killed two Israeli civilians and injured four others in Kiryat Malakhi, Israel. The shooter was killed by an off-duty IDF reservist at the scene. On 18 August, a Hamas militant from Nablus carried out a suicide bombing in Tel Aviv, wounding one person. On 1 October, two Hamas gunmen from Hebron carried out a shooting attack in Jaffa, Tel Aviv, killing seven people and injuring 17 others.

=== American involvement ===
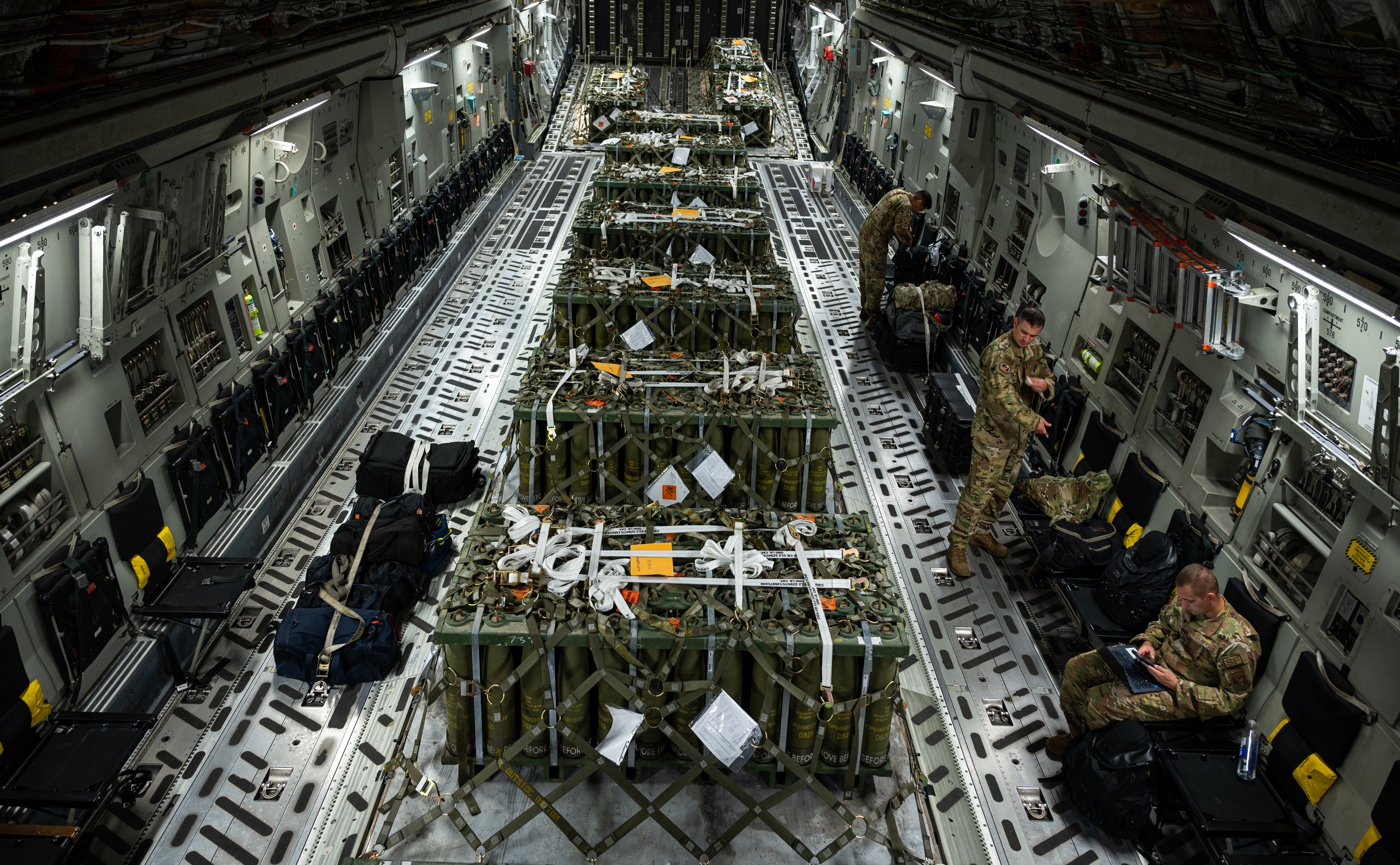
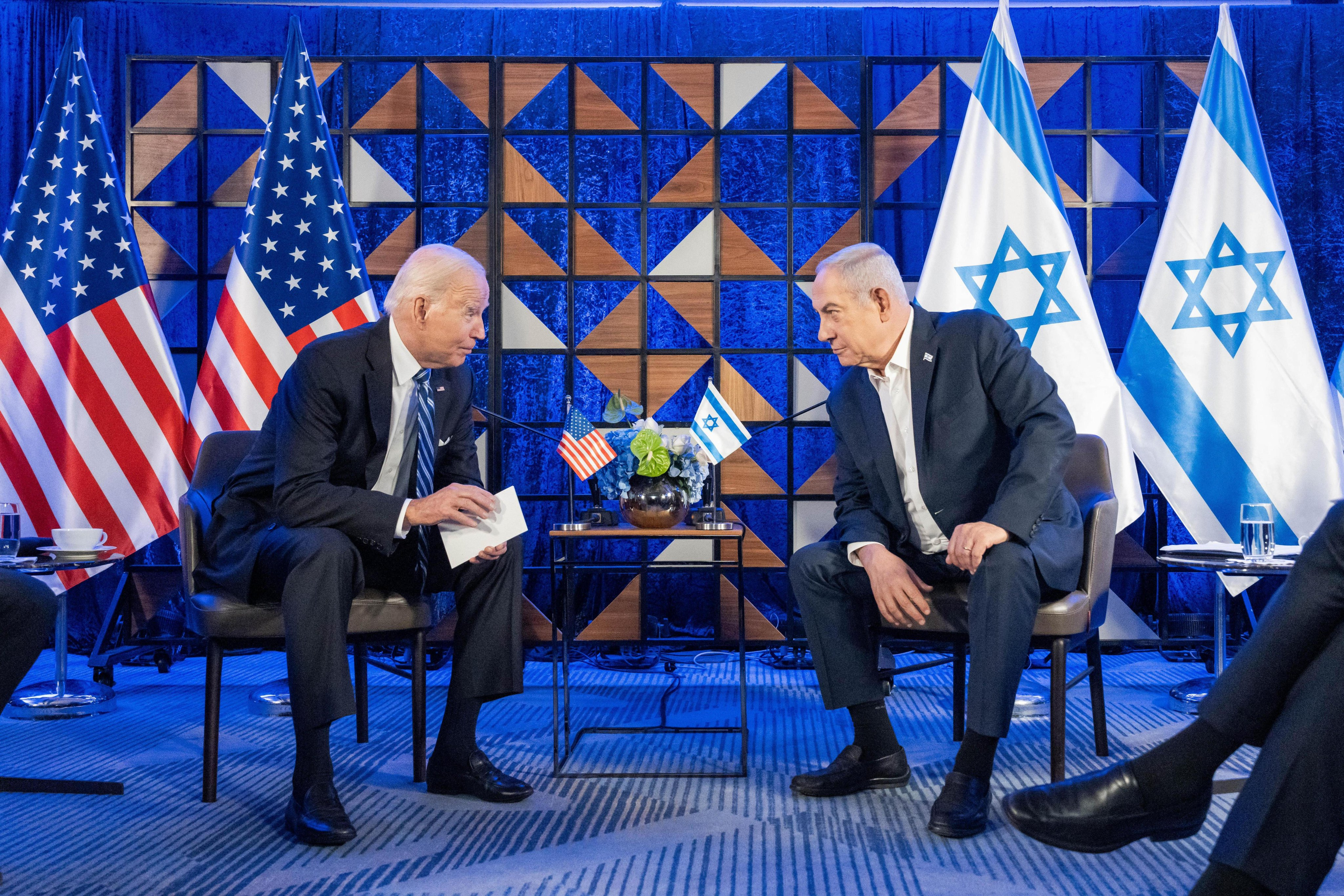
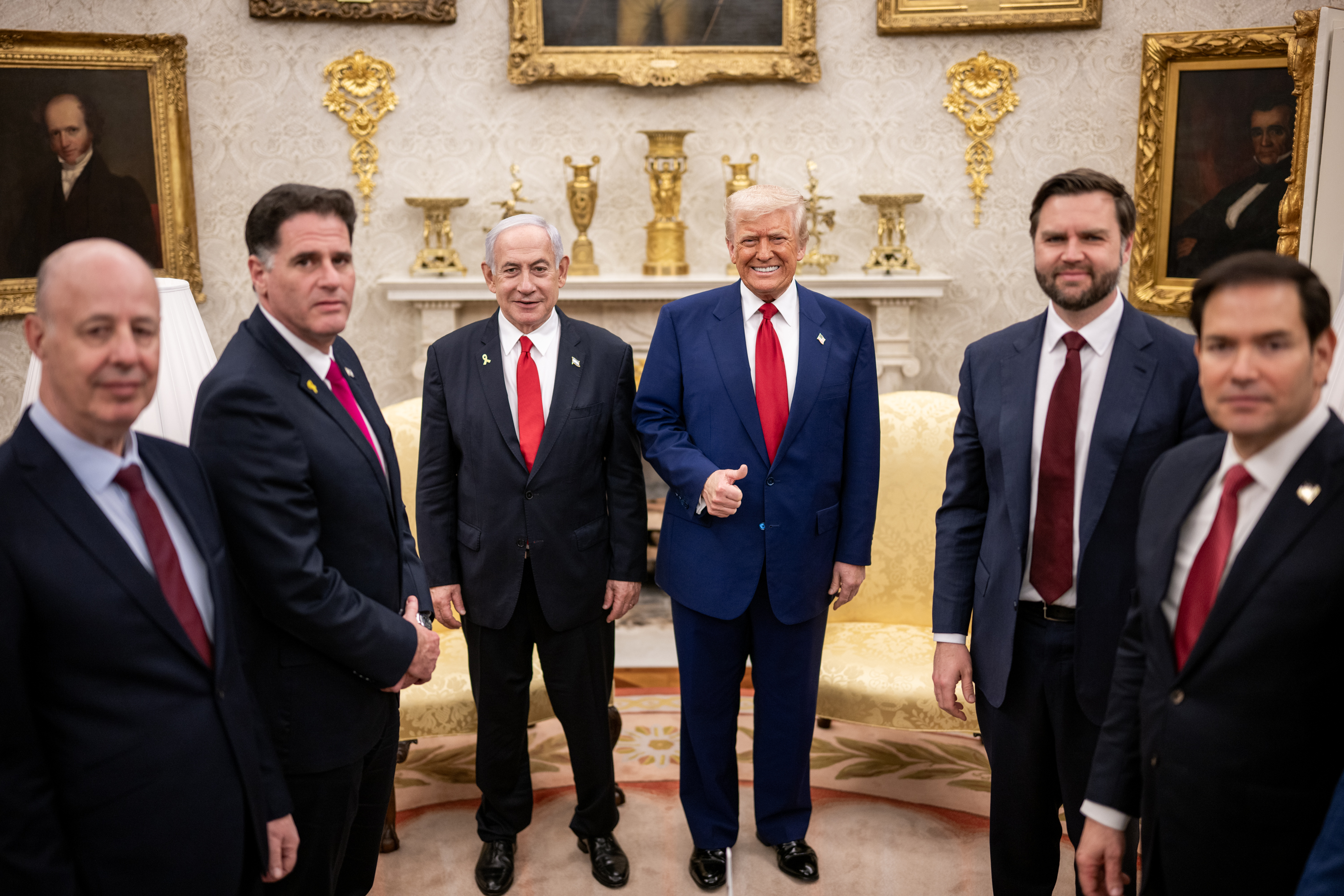
- US Air Force aircraft carrying ammunition to Israel on October 15, 2023
- US President Joe Biden on a support visit to Israeli Prime Minister Benjamin Netanyahu in Tel Aviv on October 18, 2023
- US President Donald Trump receiving Israeli Prime Minister Benjamin Netanyahu at the White House on April 7, 2025.

Since 7 October, the United States has aided Israel in pursuing its war goals in Gaza as well as attempting to deter Hamas's allies in the region and to prevent them from expanding the scope of confrontation with Israel in the Middle East. The extent of American support for Israel has surpassed its involvement in all previous Israeli wars, leading Gilbert Achcar to call it 'the first US-Israeli joint war'. Similarly, French historian Jean-Pierre Filiu argued that the extent of American support and involvement for Israel in its war against Palestine makes it a co-belligerent. The United States has funded 70% of the total costs of the Gaza war since October 2023. The true level of US investment is higher, as this figure does not include its aid to Egypt and Jordan, which is intended to maintain their peace treaties with Israel. Israel was also allowed to supply itself from American weapon stockpiles located in Israel.

Alongside substantial financial and diplomatic support, the US also intervened in the war directly. 100 American soldiers were deployed in combat to man a THAAD anti-air battery. In addition, the US piloted drones over Gaza to provide intelligence to Israel, aimed at locating hostages and Palestinian militant leaders in Gaza; this also included information on Sinwar's location. During the Biden administration, the US sent a Marine three-star general and other U.S. military officers to Israel to advise on its operations in Gaza. In November 2023, US special forces and commandos were deployed to help Israel track down hostages held in Gaza. On 18 March 2025, after Israel's surprise attack on the Gaza Strip, Israeli government spokesman David Mencer stated that the operation had been "fully coordinated with Washington" and thanked the Trump administration "for their unyielding support for Israel". On 6 April, a second THAAD system was deployed to Israel by the US.

During negotiations for an end to the war, American officials said there were plans to send 200 US soldiers to Israel to oversee the implementation of the ceasefire, though they said they would not enter Gaza, but instead Central Command will establish a "civil-military coordination center".

=== Diplomatic impact ===
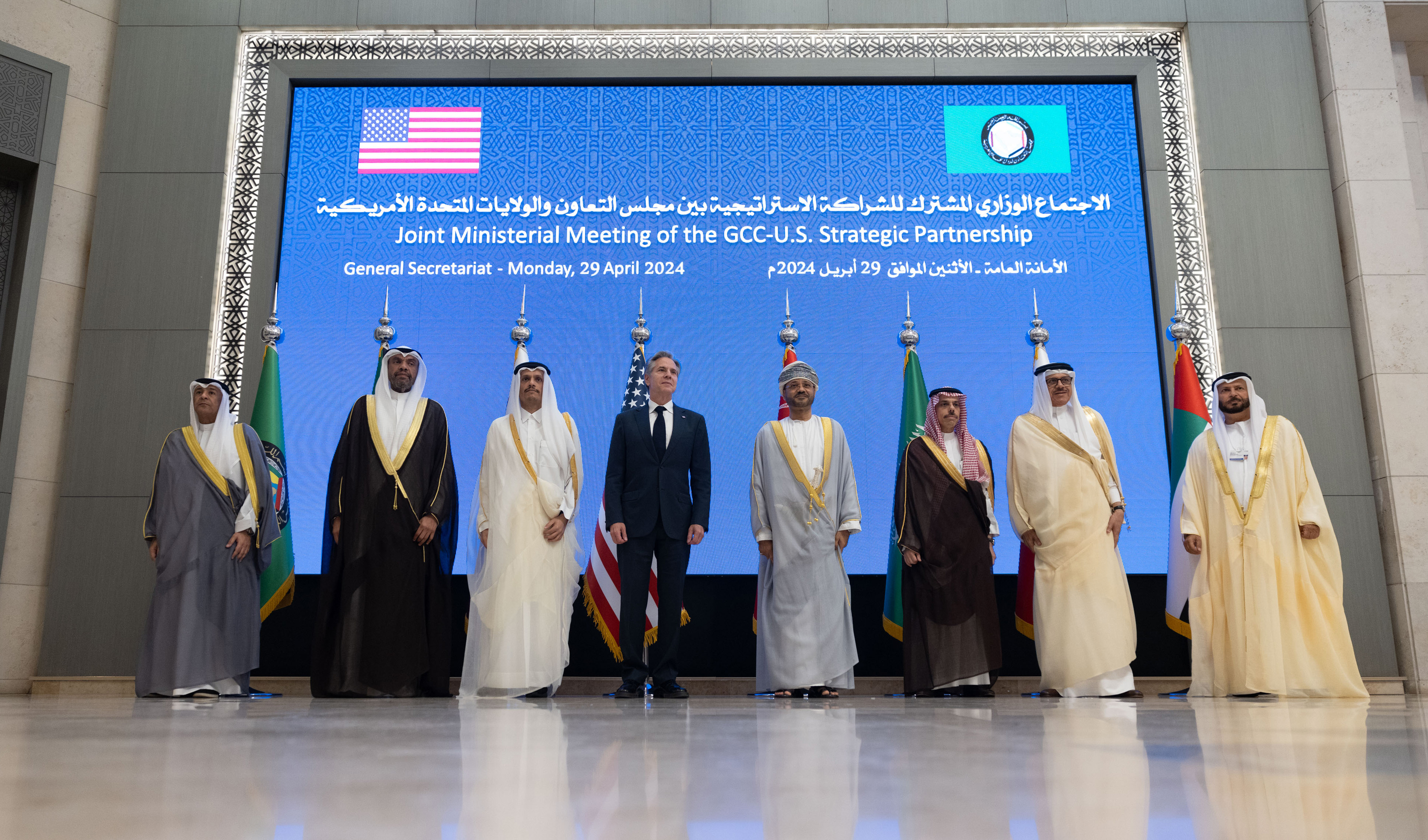
US Secretary of State Antony Blinken and foreign ministers of the Gulf Cooperation Council member states in Riyadh, Saudi Arabia, 19 April 2024

The war sparked a diplomatic crisis and affected the momentum of regional relations. Negotiations have focused on the possibility of a ceasefire, with the US, Egypt and Qatar serving as mediators. The United Nations Security Council passed resolution 2728 in March 2024, calling for an immediate ceasefire, and resolution 2735 in June 2024, calling for acceptance of the three-phase ceasefire proposal.

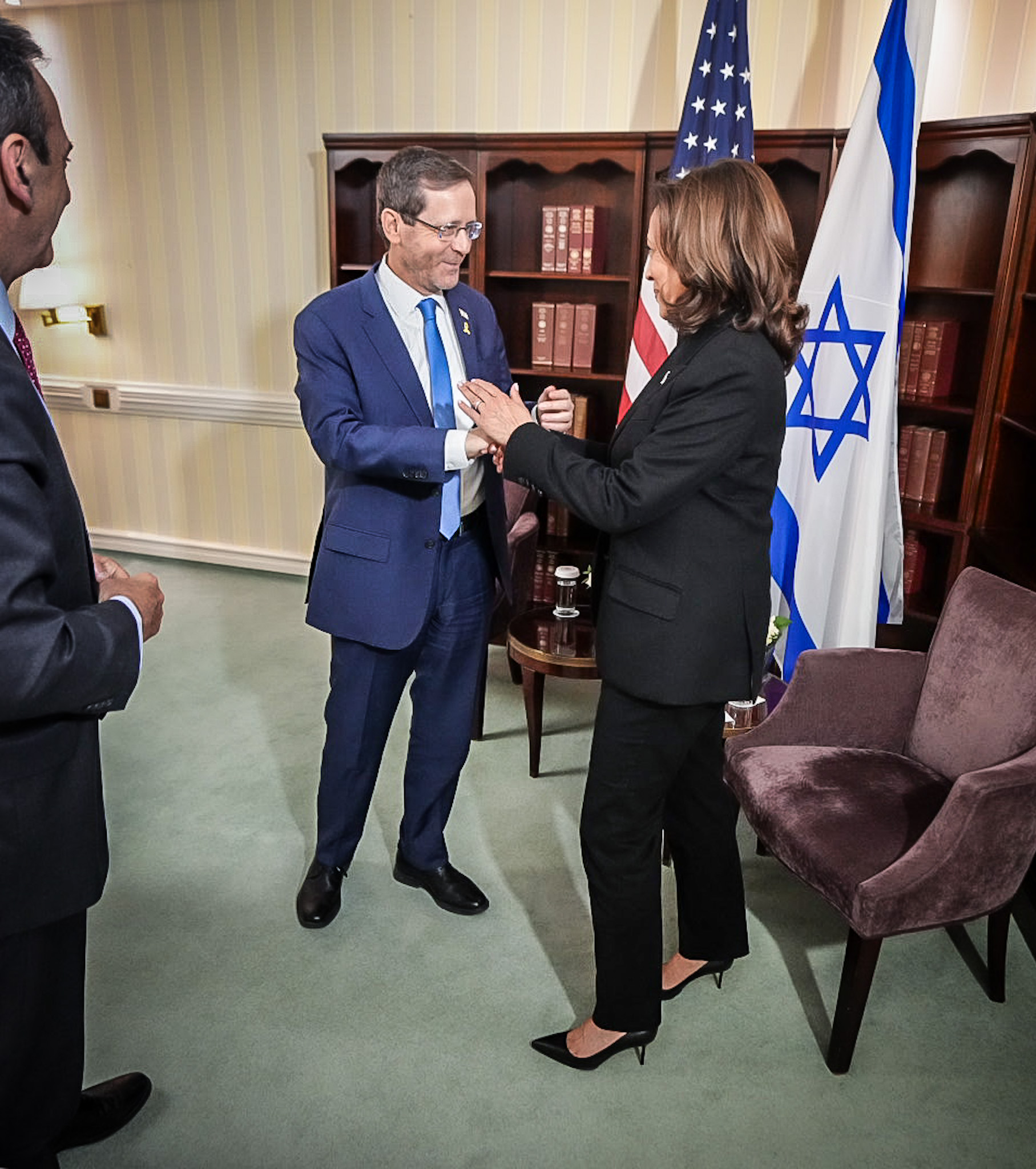
U.S. Vice President Kamala Harris with Israeli President Isaac Herzog at the 60th Munich Security Conference in Germany, February 2024

Significant geopolitical divisions emerged during the war. Israel's traditional Western allies provided diplomatic backing and weaponry to Israel; including the United States, United Kingdom, and Germany. At least 44 nations denounced Hamas and explicitly condemned its conduct on 7 October as terrorism, including a joint statement by the US, UK, France, Italy, and Germany.

Several European nations have been less supportive of Israel's actions, most notably Spain, Norway, and Ireland, all of which formally recognized the State of Palestine in a coordinated move in June 2024. Spain and Ireland have also supported South Africa's genocide case against Israel. This has led to retaliatory action by Israel, who recalled its ambassadors to all three countries and later announced that it would be closing its embassy in Dublin.

The Islamic world and much of the Global South denounced the actions of Israel and its allies, criticizing the "moral authority of the West" and alleging that it holds double standards surrounding human rights, comparing the West's unanimous condemnation of Russia's 2022 invasion of Ukraine to its implicit or explicit support of Israel's occupation of Palestine. At least nine countries withdrew their ambassadors or cut diplomatic ties with Israel. Global public opinion of Israel dropped during the war; a Morning Consult poll published in January 2024 indicated that the United States was the only remaining wealthy country in which Israel had net positive approval. The Israeli government's response prompted international protests, arrests, and harassment.

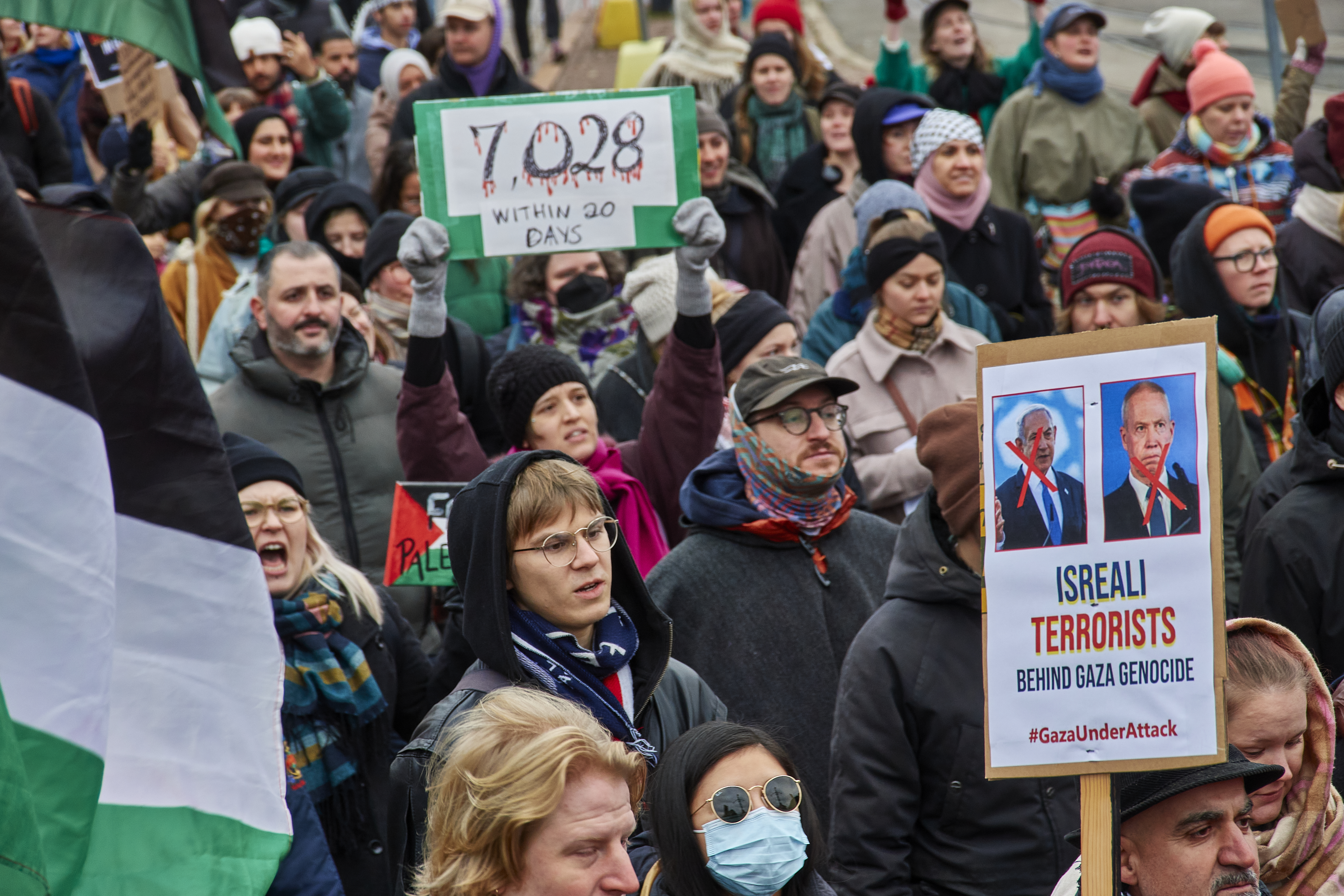
Pro-Palestinian protest in Helsinki, Finland, 28 October 2023

On 21 September 2025, the United Kingdom, Australia, Canada, and Portugal formally recognised a Palestinian state. France, Luxembourg, Monaco, Malta, and others did so the following day.

== Peace plan ==
Following the US-backed ceasefire proposal's implementation in October 2025, a broader peace plan has been advanced by the Trump administration. Following the prisoner exchanges that took place in mid-October, the plan calls for the division of Gaza into an Israeli-controlled outer zone and a coastal region to be occupied by a US-led international force before power is transferred to Palestinian technocrats under the supervision of a "Board of Peace" chaired by Trump. The United Nations Security Council has authorized the International Stabilization Force (ISF) and the Board of Peace to operate in Gaza until 2027. The plan calls for the disarmament of Hamas and demilitarization of the Gaza Strip, and the creation of a special economic zone. The reconstruction of Gaza is estimated to cost $70 billion, and had "no modern comparison" according to a Brookings Institution researcher. The details of the proposal have been contentious, with Hamas insisting on Palestinian governance being "based on Palestinian national consensus" and rejecting disarmament in the absence of broader political and security guarantees, among other conditions set out in US proposals. The ceasefire has been violated by both sides. According to Daily News Egypt, Israeli ceasefire violations have complicated the broader peace plan's implementation, with continued Israeli strikes in Gaza killing more than 1,000 Palestinians since the start of the ceasefire (both fighters and civilians). In May 2026 Nickolay Mladenov, high representative for Gaza to the Board of Peace, said that the phased plan was paralyzed over Hamas not disarming.

In December 2025, IDF Chief of Staff Eyal Zamir said that the Yellow Line would be Israel's new border line in the Gaza Strip, despite the Gaza peace plan's stipulation that Israel will not occupy or annex Gaza. Zamir said that Israel would remain in operational control over territory beyond the Yellow Line, which amounts to 53% of the Gaza Strip. Israel has moved the Yellow Line further into Gaza and applies a shoot-to-kill policy toward anyone approaching or crossing the line. Within parts of Gaza, the Yellow Line is not clearly marked or delineated. The Trump administration has said that it plans to build prefabricated structures on Israel's side of the Yellow Line; the plan was met with skepticism from Israeli officials and Arab diplomats. Arab diplomats have expressed reluctance to deploy ISF troops on the Palestinian side of the Yellow Line, suggesting that it would be better to deploy the ISF in lieu of Israeli soldiers first. An analysis by Forensic Architecture and Drop Site News showed that Israel had built 13 new outposts in Gaza since the start of the ceasefire. Palestinian property in eastern Khan Yunis was systematically destroyed in areas where new military infrastructure was built. On 24 December, Defense Minister Israel Katz suggested that Israel would build settlements in Gaza, but later walked back his comments. In a joint statement on Israeli recognition of Somaliland, several Arab and Muslim states including Saudi Arabia, Egypt, Jordan and Turkey expressed concern that Israel intended to expel the Palestinian population in Gaza and resettle Palestinians in East Africa.

== Public opinion ==
=== Domestic ===
Shortly after the October 7 attacks, there was broad support in Israeli society for military operations in Gaza. A public opinion poll conducted in December 2023 by the Israel Democracy Institute found that 87% of Jewish Israelis supported the war in Gaza. In a poll from February 2024 by the same organization, 68% of the 510 Israeli respondents supported preventing all international aid from entering Gaza. A poll in March 2025 from Penn State University found that 82% of 1,005 Israeli respondents supported the forced displacement of Gaza residents, and 47% agreed that the IDF should kill all inhabitants when taking over a city resembling the fall of Jericho. Throughout the war, there have also been Gaza war protests in Israel primarily as Israeli hostage deal protests over the lack of progress in resolving the Gaza war hostage crisis, most notably taking place in Tel Aviv.

Among the Arab citizens of Israel specifically, a majority (56%) of all respondents considered the October 7 attacks as not reflective of Islam or of Arab society, a strong majority (86.5%) either strongly or somewhat supported civilian volunteering efforts during the war, and around 60% were familiar with instructions from the Home Front Command and always follow them. Regarding harm to the Palestinian civilian population during the war, a majority (58%) attributed responsibility to both Hamas and the IDF equally, while some attributed responsibility either only to Hamas (16%) or only to the IDF (14.5%). The Arab population also viewed the war less favorably compared to Jewish Israelis, with only 38% of Arab respondents believing Israel will be successful in defeating Hamas compared to 76% from their Jewish counterparts, and 74% believed the war has gone too far compared to 4% from Jewish respondents.

A December 2023 poll by PCPSR found that 72% of respondents (52% of Gazans and 85% of West Bank residents) approved of the October 7 attacks. A 2024 follow-up poll found that two-thirds of respondents continued to approve of the attacks.

In a poll from June 2024, 54% of Palestinian respondents viewed the October 7 attacks as a correct decision, with 64% support among those from the West Bank and 39% among those from the Gaza Strip. At the same time, 89% did not believe that Hamas committed atrocities such as sexual violence during the attacks, while 8% did believe it happened. Additionally, half of respondents in Gaza expected Hamas to win the war, while a quarter expected Israel to win.

=== International ===
A 2025 Gallup poll found that 60% of Americans disapproved of Israel's military actions in Gaza while 32% supported them. Younger adults and Democrats were much more likely to oppose Israel's actions than Republicans. A 2025 Pew Research Center poll found that 39% of Americans believed that Israel's actions had been excessive in Gaza and approximately 59% held a poor view of Israel's actions in the war.

International public opinion surveys generally recorded increasingly negatively views of Israel as the war continued. A June 2026 Pew Research Center survey across 36 countries found that majorities or pluralities in most countries held unfavorable views of Israel, while confidence in Israel's Prime Minister Benjamin Netanyahu was also low across many of the countries surveyed. Unfavorable views were particularly more common among younger adults and those identifying with the political left.

The Middle East Studies Association has announced that since October 7, 2023, 76 professors and academics in the United States and Canada have lost their jobs because of their stances or activities supporting Palestine.

== Media coverage ==
In reporting on the conflict, foreign media have limited access to Gaza and only in the presence of Israeli soldiers. Vox reported that the news organizations "have to submit all materials and footage to the IDF for review before publication". The conflict has also seen large numbers of journalists wounded or killed. The International Federation of Journalists stated that as many journalists were killed in the first two months of the Gaza war as in the two decades of the Vietnam War. Reporters Without Borders filed a complaint with the International Criminal Court under the Rome Statute, accusing Israel of committing war crimes against eight journalists. It also lodged a complaint against Hamas for the killing of a reporter covering the October 7 attack. The Committee to Protect Journalists accused Israel of targeting journalists reporting from Gaza and their families.

== See also ==
- Outline of the Gaza war
- List of companies involved in the Gaza war
- List of modern conflicts in the Middle East
- List of wars involving Israel
- List of wars involving Palestine
- Misinformation in the Gaza war
- Post-war plans for the Gaza Strip
- Timeline of the Israeli–Palestinian conflict
  - Timeline of the Israeli–Palestinian conflict in 2023
  - Timeline of the Israeli–Palestinian conflict in 2024
  - Timeline of the Israeli–Palestinian conflict in 2025
  - Timeline of the Israeli–Palestinian conflict in 2026
