= Jamila al-Shanti =

Palestinian politician (1955–2023)

- جميلة الشنطي
- Al-Shanti c. 2021

Member of the Palestinian Legislative Council for Khan Yunis Governorate
- In office 18 February 2006 – 19 October 2023

Personal details
- Born: Jamila Abdallah Taha al-Shanti; 15 March 1955 Jabalia refugee camp, Gaza Strip, Palestine
- Died: 19 October 2023 (aged 68) Gaza, Gaza Strip, Palestine
- Cause of death: Bombing
- Party: Hamas
- Spouse: Abdel Aziz al-Rantisi (assassinated 2004)
- Occupation: Faculty member; teacher; politician; activist

Jamila Abdallah Taha al-Shanti (Arabic: جميلة عبد الله طه الشنطي; 15 March 1955 – 19 October 2023) was a Palestinian politician and senior Hamas official. Married to Hamas co-founder Abdel Aziz al-Rantisi, she was elected to the Palestinian Legislative Council in 2006 and to the Hamas Political Bureau in 2021, the first women elected to that body. She was killed in an Israeli strike during the Gaza war.

== Early life ==
Al-Shanti was born on 15 March 1955 to a Palestinian refugee family in the Jabalia refugee camp. She held a PhD in English.

== Career ==
Al-Shanti was a member of Hamas and was the founder of the group's women's division. On 3 November 2006, she led an unarmed women's march that succeeded in breaking an Israeli siege on a mosque in the town of Beit Hanoun. The Israeli military opened fire on the group, describing them as "human shields", one was killed and ten were wounded.

In the 2006 Palestinian legislative election, she was the third candidate on the Hamas-led "Change and Reform" electoral list. She was the most senior woman among Hamas deputies elected in 2006 and became minister in 2011.

In 2021, al-Shanti was elected as one of 15 members of the Hamas Political Bureau, the group's highest decision-making body. She was the first woman ever to hold such a position in Hamas.

== Personal life ==
Al-Shanti was married to Abd al-Aziz al-Rantisi, co-founder of Hamas, who was killed by Israel in 2004. In 2006, she claimed that an Israeli airstrike aimed at her had instead killed her sister-in-law and over a dozen other people. International media confirmed that there had been an airstrike on al-Shanti's home and that it killed Nahla Shanti and Abdel Majid Ghirbawi.

She taught at the Islamic University of Gaza until 2006.

== Death ==
On 19 October 2023, during the Gaza war, al-Shanti was killed in an Israeli airstrike on her home in the Gaza Strip. France 24 listed her as one of the "key figures on Israel's hit list" after the October 7 attack on Israel.
