= 2004 Ashdod Port bombings =

Series of suicide bombings in Israel

- Part of the Second Intifada militancy campaign
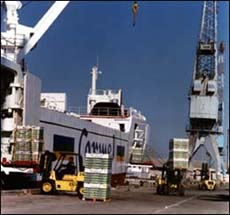
- Port of Ashdod in 2006

- The attack site
- Location: 31°49′49″N 34°38′29″E; Ashdod, Israel
- Date: March 14, 2004; 22 years ago 16:20 pm
- Attack type: Suicide bombing
- Deaths: 10 civilians (+2 bombers)
- Injuries: 16 civilians
- Perpetrators: Hamas and Fatah claimed responsibility
- No. of participants: 2

The 2004 Ashdod Port bombings were two suicide bombings carried out nearly simultaneously on March 14, 2004 at the Port of Ashdod in Ashdod, Israel. As a result, 10 civilians were killed and 16 were injured. Hamas and Fatah claimed joint responsibility for the attack.

== The attack ==
Memorial for the attack victims

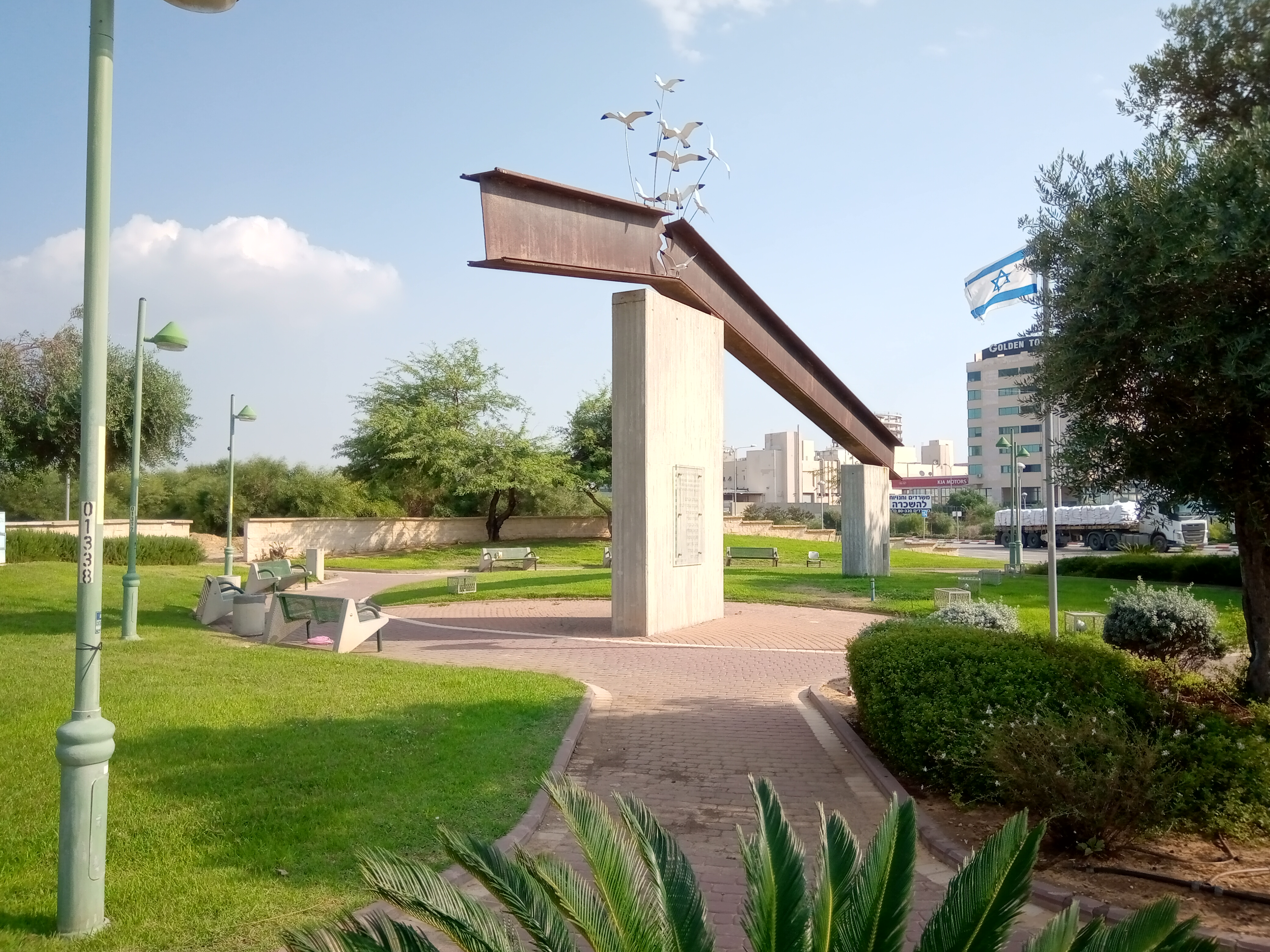

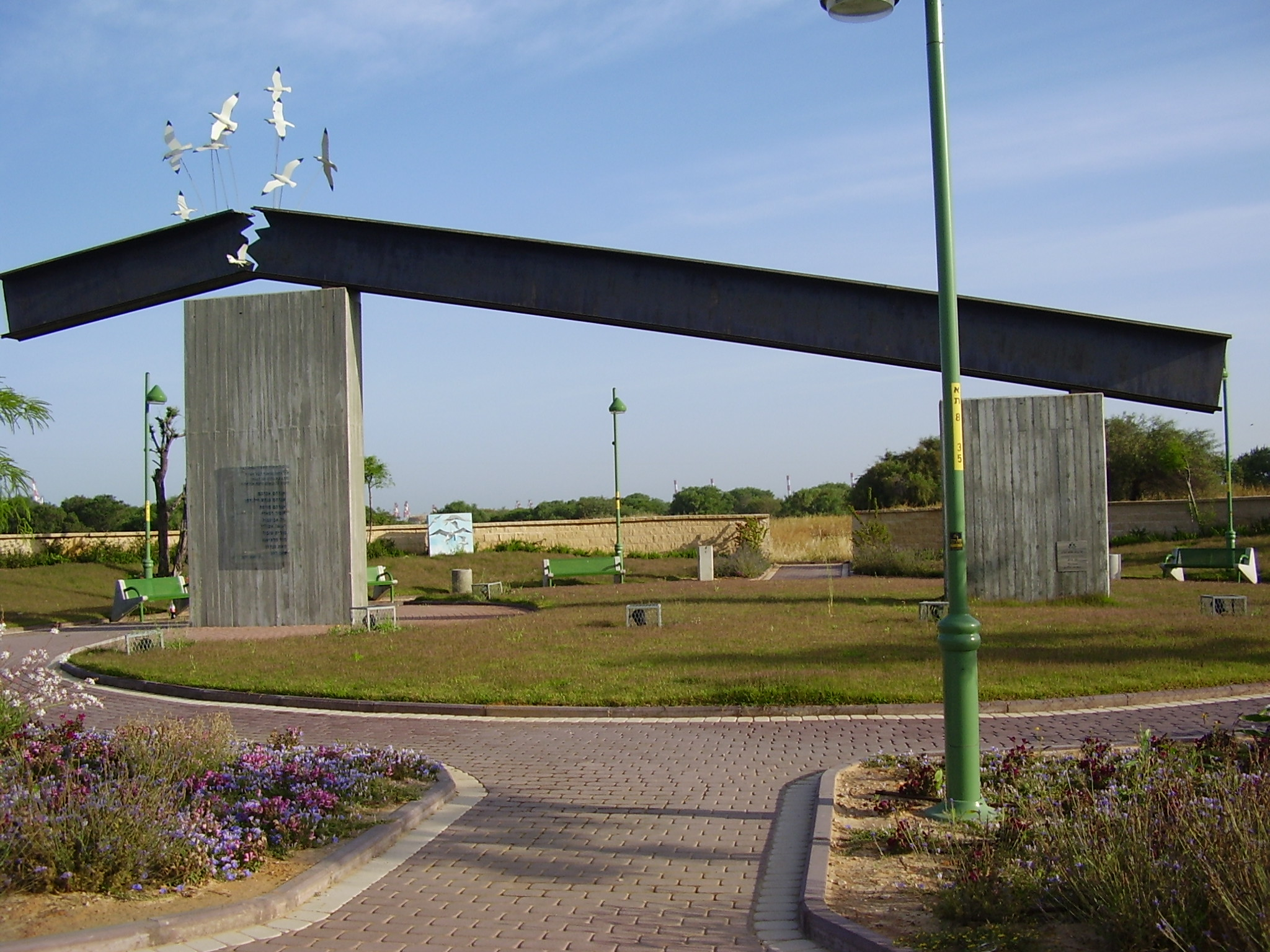

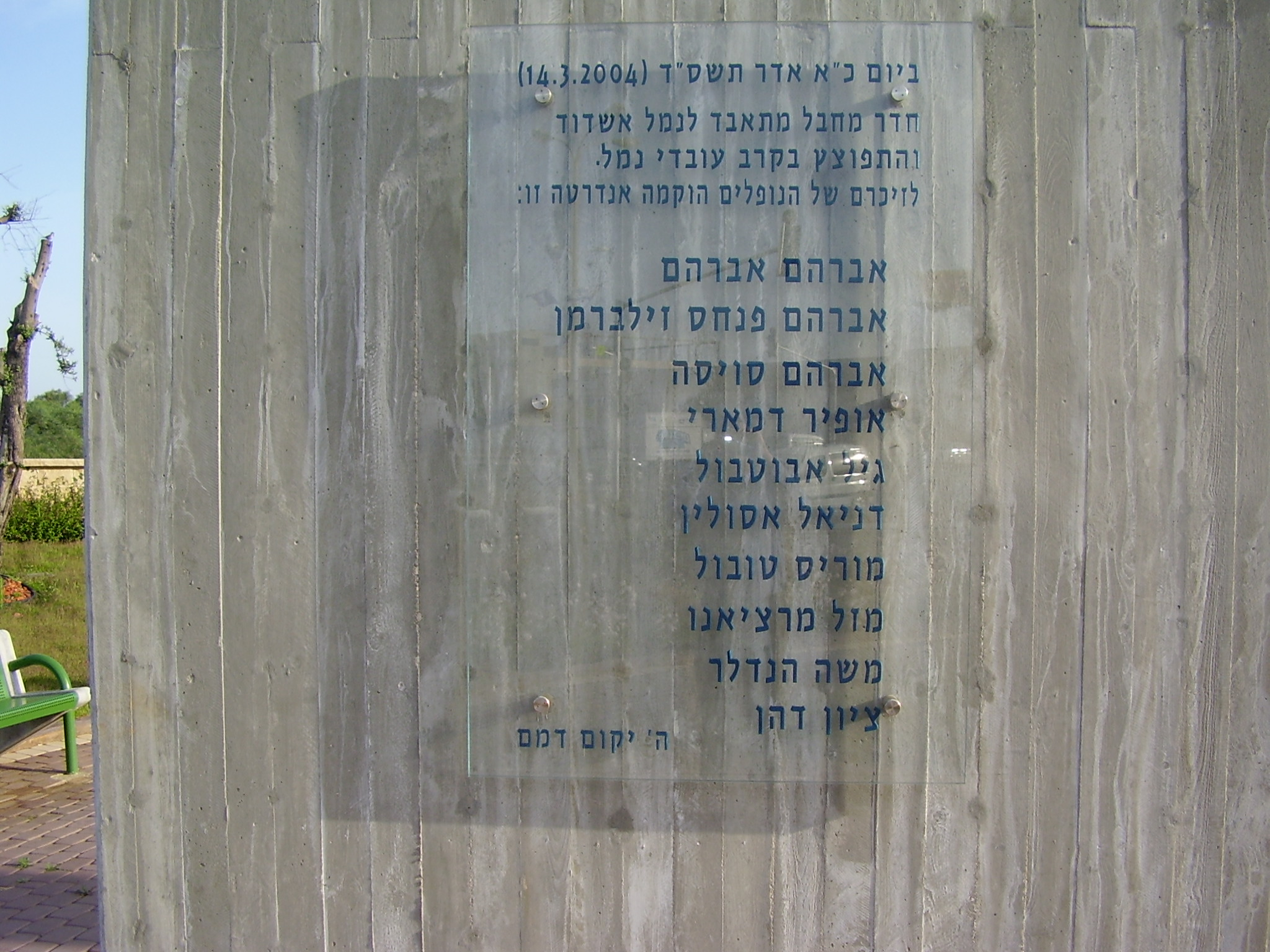

On Sunday, March 14, 2004, two Palestinian suicide bombers who wore explosive belts hidden underneath their clothes approached the Port of Ashdod. Despite the vast security arrangements at the compound, the two suicide bombers managed to infiltrate the compound by digging under the fence. The victims had just given them water to drink.

At 16:20 pm the suicide bombers detonated their explosive devices - one exploded himself in an office building inside the compound, and the other exploded after a few moments at the entrance to the compound. The force of the blast killed ten civilians, most of them were port workers, and injured 16 others.

== The victims ==
The ten people who were killed were:

- Gil Abutbul, 38, of Ashdod, crane mechanic
- Danny Assulin, 51, of Ashdod, mechanical equipment department
- Avraham Avraham, 34, of Ashdod, crane electrician
- Zion Dahan, 30, of Ashdod, heavy equipment mechanic
- Ophir Damari, 31, of Rehovot, workshop worker
- Moshe Yaacov Hendler, 29, of Rehovot, crane mechanic
- Mazal Marciano, 30, of Ashdod, marketing manager
- Avi Suissa, 56, of Kiryat Malachi, warehouse,
- Maurice Tubul, 30, of Ashdod, mechanic
- Pinhas Avraham Zilberman, 45, of Tel Aviv, driver

== The perpetrators and Israeli response ==
Hamas and Fatah claimed joint responsibility for the attack and stated that the attack was carried out by two 18-year-olds from the Jabalya refugee camp in the Gaza Strip. The two assailants managed to infiltrate Israel from Gaza by hiding in a container that went through the Karni Crossing. A Hamas leader in Gaza stated that the original plan was that the suicide bombers would blow up fuel tanks at the port; Israel said the bombers intended to carry out a "mega attack" with hundreds of casualties, but instead blew themselves up hundreds of meters from the tanks. Later on it was revealed that the attack was financed and directed by Nizar Rayan. In response, Hamas founder Ahmed Yassin was killed along with his bodyguards and several bystanders (eleven people in total) by hellfire missiles fired at his wheelchair from Israeli helicopters in Gaza City.

== See also ==
- Pi Glilot bombing
- Israeli casualties of war
