= Abdel Aziz al-Rantisi =

Palestinian political leader (1947–2004)

- عبد العزيز الرنتيسي

Chairman of the Hamas Shura Council
- In office 22 March 2004 – 17 April 2004
- Preceded by: Ahmed Yassin
- Succeeded by: Unknown (likely Nizar Awadallah)

Deputy Chairman of the Hamas Shura Council
- In office 10 December 1987 – 22 March 2004
- Preceded by: Position created
- Succeeded by: Unknown

2nd Chairman of the Hamas Political Bureau in the Gaza Strip
- In office 22 March 2004 – 17 April 2004
- Preceded by: Ahmed Yassin
- Succeeded by: Ismail Haniyeh

Personal details
- Born: Abdel Aziz al-Rantisi; 23 October 1947 Yibna, Ramle, Mandatory Palestine
- Died: 17 April 2004 (aged 56) Gaza City, Gaza Strip, Palestine
- Cause of death: Assassination by airstrike
- Spouse: Jamila Abdallah Taha al-Shanti
- Education: Alexandria University

Abdel Aziz al-Rantisi (Arabic: عبد العزيز الرنتيسي; 23 October 1947 – 17 April 2004) was a Palestinian political leader and co-founder of Hamas, along with Sheikh Ahmed Yassin in 1987. He also served as the chairman of the Hamas Shura Council from the assassination of Hamas founder Ahmed Yassin on 22 March 2004 until his own assassination in April 2004 and the first deputy chairman of the Hamas Shura Council from December 1987 until March 2004.

Rantisi was born in Yibna, Mandatory Palestine in 1947. During the 1948 Arab-Israeli War, his family fled or were expelled by Zionist militias to the Gaza Strip. In 1956, when he was nine, Israeli soldiers killed his uncle in front of him in Khan Younis, which he stated had a lifelong impact on him. He studied pediatric medicine and genetics at Alexandria University in Egypt, graduating first in his class; during that time he became a member of the Muslim Brotherhood. In 1976, he returned to Gaza to teach parasitology and genetics at the Islamic University of Gaza.

During the First Intifada against the Israeli occupation in 1988, he became a popular organizer and a leader whose efforts helped the formation of Hamas. Rantisi became Hamas's political leader and spokesman in the Gaza Strip following the Israeli killing of Hamas spiritual leader Sheikh Ahmed Yassin in March 2004. Rantisi opposed compromise with Israel and called for the creation of a Palestinian state (including the whole of the State of Israel) through military action against Israel.

On 17 April 2004, Rantisi was assassinated by the Israeli Air Force, which fired Hellfire missiles from an AH-64 Apache helicopter at his car.

== Early life and education ==
Rantisi was born in Yibna, near Ramle in Mandatory Palestine on 23 October 1947. During the 1948 Arab-Israeli War, his family fled or were expelled by Zionist militias to the Gaza Strip. In 1956, when he was eight or nine, he witnessed the Khan Yunis massacre, in which Israeli soldiers killed hundreds of Palestinians in the Gaza Strip. During the massacre, al-Rantisi recalled that Israeli soldiers killed his uncle in front of him — as he explained to Joe Sacco, this fact was very important for his future life. He studied pediatric medicine and genetics at Egypt's, Alexandria University, graduating first in his class. He was a certified physician. During his time in Egypt, he became a deeply convicted member of the Muslim Brotherhood. In 1976, Rantisi returned to Gaza to teach parasitology and genetics at the Islamic University.

== History with Hamas ==
In 1987, four Palestinian civilians of the Jabalya refugee camp were killed in a traffic accident that involved Israeli settlers and soldiers. Rantisi joined Sheikh Ahmad Yassin and Salah Shehadeh, among others, encouraging people to protest the occupation, after mosque services. This was the start of the First Intifada, which lasted five years. Rantisi became a popular organizer and leader whose efforts helped the formation of Hamas. In December 1992, Rantissi was deported to southern Lebanon, as part of the expulsion of 416 Hamas and Palestinian Islamic Jihad operatives, and emerged as the general spokesman of the expellees.

On 8 June 2003, he directed a Hamas-led attack in which four Israeli soldiers were killed at the Erez Crossing in the Gaza Strip. On 10 June 2003, Rantisi survived an Israeli helicopter attack on a car in which he was traveling. He was lightly wounded in the attack, which killed one of his bodyguards, a civilian, and wounded at least 25 others. Rantisi also reportedly threatened, while in his bed in Al-Shifa Hospital, "not a single Jew in Palestine is safe" and "kill Israeli political leaders, because all of them are killers".

On 23 March 2004, Rantisi was named leader of Hamas in the Gaza Strip, following the killing of Ahmed Yassin by Israeli forces. On 27 March 2004, Rantisi addressed 5,000 supporters in Gaza. He declared the then-US President George W. Bush to be an "enemy of Muslims" and asserted that "America declared war against God. Sharon declared war against God and God declared war against America, Bush and Sharon. The war of God continues against them and I can see the victory coming up from the land of Palestine by the hand of Hamas."

== Assassination ==
On 17 April 2004, Rantisi was assassinated by the Israeli Air Force, when they fired Hellfire missiles from an AH-64 Apache helicopter at his car. Two others, a bodyguard (named Akram Nassar), and Rantisi's 27-year-old son Mohammed, were also killed in the attack, and four bystanders wounded. Israeli army radio stated that this was the first opportunity to target Rantisi, without significant collateral damage, since he took the leadership of Hamas, alleging that he had surrounded himself with human shields since the killing of Yassin.

=== Reactions ===
Israeli Foreign Ministry spokesman Jonathan Peled stated:

"Israel...today struck a mastermind of terrorism, with blood on his hands. As long as the Palestinian Authority does not lift a finger and fight terrorism, Israel will continue to have to do so itself."

British Foreign Minister Jack Straw condemned the action:

"The British government has made it repeatedly clear that so-called 'targeted assassinations' of this kind are unlawful, unjustified and counter-productive."

== Personal life ==
Rantisi was married to Jamila Abdallah Taha al-Shanti, who was elected to the Palestinian Legislative Council in 2006, and who was herself assassinated in 2023; they had six children.

== Writings ==
Al-Rantisi's political writings and poems were widely published in Arabic newspapers and on his personal website. Among his books we find Memoirs of the Martyr Dr. Abdel Aziz Al-Rantisi, compiled by Amer Shamakh, which offers insights into his personal experiences, ideological beliefs, and the events that shaped his role in the Palestinian resistance.

== Legacy ==
The Al-Rantisi Pediatric Hospital, in Gaza City, is named after him. It provided treatment for cancer and kidney failure.

== See also ==
- Al-Rantisi Hospital
- Jamila Abdallah Taha al-Shanti
