= Killing of Ahmed Yassin =

2004 assassination of Hamas co-founder

- Date: 22 March 2004; 22 years ago
- Location: Sabra, Gaza Strip
- Type: Airstrike from helicopter
- Target: Ahmed Yassin
- Perpetrator: Israel Defense Forces
- Deaths: 10

On 22 March 2004, the Palestinian leader and one of the founders of Hamas, Ahmed Yassin, aged 67, (Note: His date of birth is disputed, see: Ahmed Yassin § Early life and education.) was assassinated in Gaza City. Sheikh Ahmed Yassin – who used a wheelchair due to being quadriplegic since his adolescence – was returning from performing the Fajr prayer, and his companions were also killed immediately. His assassination caused a state of anger and Palestinian factions vowed revenge, with Hamas saying that Israeli prime minister Ariel Sharon "opened the gates of hell." Shortly after the attack, Abdel Aziz al-Rantisi took over the leadership of the movement in the Gaza Strip.

Yassin survived an earlier attempt on his life, on 6 September 2003. According to Israeli radio, Sharon personally supervised the 2004 attack on Yassin.

== Attack ==
IDF helicopters launched multiple missiles with the specific aim of targeting Sheikh Yassin as he was coming back from morning prayers at the mosque near his residence in the Sabra neighborhood of Gaza. The assassination also killed nine Palestinian bystanders and caused injuries to 15 individuals, among them being two sons of Sheikh Yassin. The assassination occurred approximately one week following the 2004 Ashdod Port bombings.

== Reactions ==
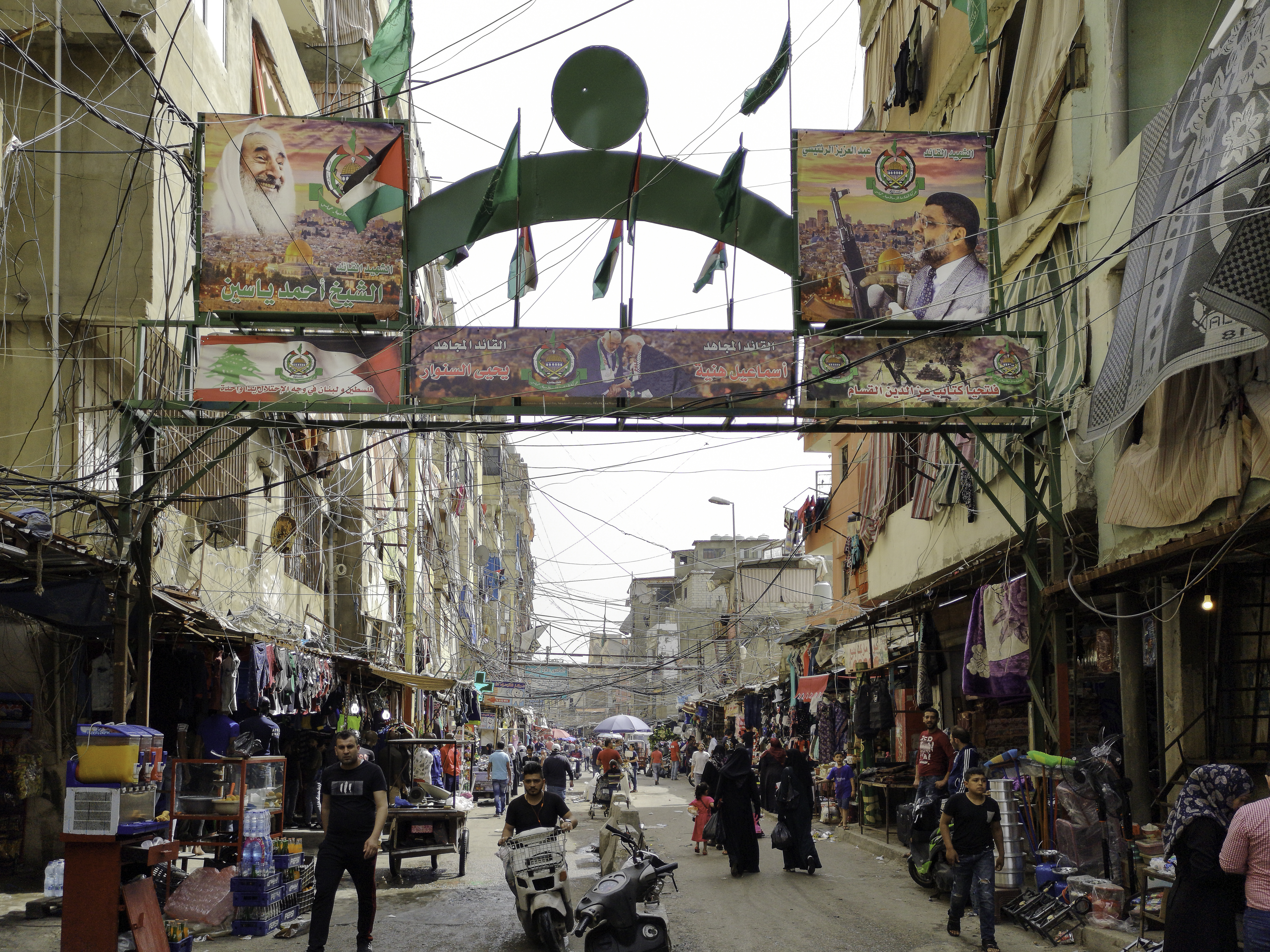
Photo of Yassin (left) placed in a gate at Shatila refugee camp in honor of Yassin.

=== Palestine ===
Hamas

- Abdel Aziz al-Rantisi announced during a public event in Gaza that he is taking on the role of leading Hamas and emphasized the importance of unity, alignment, and staying true to the movement's principles. "We need to come together and stand strong in the trenches of resistance. We will not give up, and we shouldn't, when faced with acts of Zionist terrorism. Sheikh Ahmed Yassin serves as our symbol, and we will follow the same principles and work towards the objectives that Sheikh Ahmed Yassin held dear."

Palestinian National Authority

- President Yasser Arafat and the executive committee of the Palestine Liberation Organization expressed their profound condemnation of the assassination. They urged all Palestinians to observe a period of mourning lasting three days. In a statement, "President Yasser Arafat and the Palestinian leadership expressed strong condemnation for the assassination of the revered leader, Sheikh Ahmed Yassin, referring to him as a heroic warrior and martyr. They considered this act as a flagrant violation beyond acceptable limits. The Palestinian authorities urged all Palestinians, both within the region and abroad, to observe a three-day mourning period in honor of Sheikh Yassin, who was tragically killed by an Israeli military operation in Gaza." The leadership urged the Palestinians to come together, unite, and foster cohesion.
- The killing was strongly condemned by Prime Minister Ahmed Qurei. He described it as a "severe and abhorrent act" during a press conference outside Arafat's office in Ramallah. Qurei emphasized that "the purpose behind this action was to perpetuate violence and called upon the Quartet and the United States to put an end to Israel's reckless behavior." He urged them "to recognize the value of Palestinian lives", stating that "enough was enough and that the Quartet and the United States should intervene to halt Israel's irrational conduct."

=== Israel ===
Israel

- Finance minister Benjamin Netanyahu hailed the targeted killing.
- Permanent representative to the UN Dan Gillerman said that the Palestinian leadership has proven beyond a doubt that it does not wish to take any step to combat terrorism. He added that by removing Yassin from the international arena, Israel is sending a strong message to terrorists: "When you kill our citizens, you will not be spared."

=== International ===
- Canada – Foreign Minister Bill Graham announced that Ottawa regrets and condemns the killing of Ahmed Yassin. He explained in a speech before the House of Commons that Israel is in a "very difficult situation".
- Egypt – President Hosni Mubarak "regretted the killing of Ahmed Yassin in a brutal military operation that had no meaning and whose repercussions and consequences were not calculated. He added "that Israel is taking advantage of Washington's preoccupation with the presidential elections". Egypt announced a boycott of the ceremony commemorating the signing of the peace treaty with Israel.
- European Union – Javier Solana, the European Union's High Representative for Foreign Policy, condemned the act of killing, highlighting its "detrimental impact on the peace process and emphasizing that it fails to create any favorable circumstances for achieving peace."
- France – President Jacques Chirac said that he unreservedly condemned the Israeli army's assassination of Yassin, describing it as a violation of international law.
- Iraq – Mowaffak al-Rubaie, a member of the Iraqi Governing Council, criticized the killing and argued that it would provide further justification for terrorist actions worldwide, ultimately hindering peace efforts.
- Kuwait – Prime Minister Sabah Al-Ahmad Al-Sabah expressed his sadness and urged the world to act. He added that "violence will escalate now because violence always breeds violence".
- Lebanon – Lebanese President Émile Lahoud strongly condemned the Israeli action.
  - Hezbollah – Hezbollah's spiritual leader, Mohammad Hussein Fadlallah, accused U.S. President George W. Bush of complicity. Saying that "Bush is a killer in the same way as Sharon. He is the one who gave the green light to the Zionist criminals to carry out acts of liquidation and a war of extermination against the Palestinian people."
- United Kingdom – Foreign Secretary Jack Straw said: "We condemn this action. It is unacceptable, unjustified and unlikely to achieve its goal."

==== International media ====
Financial Times called the assassination "extremely stupid," and even The Daily Telegraph, which is normally pro-Israel, called it a "serious mistake." The Guardian reported that many Palestinians saw the killing as "cowardly" (given that Yassin was a disabled man) and were outraged that Yassin's killing might motivate more Palestinians to attack Israel. Only The Sun wrote positively of Yassin's assassination writing "Being 'spiritual leader' of Hamas is not like being the Archbishop of Canterbury," and also that "Ahmed Yassin was a Godfather of Terror, the man who founded the Palestinian killing machine... One more terrorist mastermind is dead."

== Legacy ==
After Yassin, Hamas was led by Abdel Aziz al-Rantisi, who was killed in a similar way to Yassin two weeks later. The Al-Rantisi Hospital Children's Hospital is named after him. The movement was then led by Khaled Mashal until 2017. Yassin had firmly aligned with Saudi Arabia even though the Saudis were not able to provide Hamas with sophisticated weaponry. However, Mashal was more flexible and ambitious. He moved Hamas closer to Iran which, in contrast to the Saudis, provided Hamas with rocket designs. By the time Mashal left, Hamas had built a large aresenal of high-grade weaponry.

== See also ==
- Assassination of Abdel Aziz al-Rantisi
- Assassination of Saleh al-Arouri
- Assassination of Ismail Haniyeh
