= Hamas =

Islamist Palestinian political and paramilitary organization

Islamic Resistance Movement حركة المقاومة الإسلامية
- Emblem of Hamas
- Chairman of the Political Bureau: Khalil al-Hayya
- Deputy Chairman of the Political Bureau: Vacant
- Chairman of the Shura Council: Muhammad Ismail Darwish
- Chairman of the Political Bureau in the Gaza Strip: Ali al-Amoudi
- Military commander: Vacant
- Founders: Ahmed Yassin X; Abdel Aziz al-Rantisi X... and others: Mahmoud al-Zahar; Mohammad Taha #; Imad al-Alami; Abdul Fatah Dukhan #; Ibrahim Fares Al-Yazouri; 'Isa al-Nashshar; Ibrahim Quqa; Mohammed Hassan Shama'a; Hassan Yousef
- Founded: 10 December 1987; 38 years ago
- Headquarters: Gaza City, Gaza Strip
- Armed wing: Al-Qassam Brigades
- Ideology: Sunni Islamism; Islamic fundamentalism; Palestinian nationalism; Anti-Zionism; Islamic nationalism
- Political position: Right-wing
- Religion: Sunni Islam
- International affiliation: Axis of Resistance (informal)
- Political alliance: Alliance of Palestinian Forces; Palestinian Joint Operations Room
- Colours: Green
- Palestinian Legislative Council (2006): 74 / 132 (56%)

Website
- almoqawma.com

The Islamic Resistance Movement, abbreviated Hamas (Note: UK: /həˈmæs/ hə-MASS, US: /həˈmɑːs/ hə-MAHSS; Arabic: حماس, romanized: Ḥamās, IPA: [ħaˈmaːs]) (an acronym from the Arabic: حركة المقاومة الإسلامية, romanized: Ḥarakat al-Muqāwamah al-ʾIslāmiyyah), (Note: commonly Arabic: حركة حماس, romanized: Haraka Hamas, lit. 'Hamas Movement'.) is a Sunni Islamist Palestinian nationalist political organisation with a military wing known as the al-Qassam Brigades. It has governed the Israeli-occupied Gaza Strip since 2007. In July 2026, it announced the resignation of its civilian administration under the Gaza peace plan and US president Donald Trump announced that his Board of Peace had reached an agreement to disarm Hamas.

The Hamas movement was founded by Palestinian Islamic scholar Ahmed Yassin in 1987 after the outbreak of the First Intifada against the Israeli occupation. It emerged from his 1973 Mujama al-Islamiya Islamic charity affiliated with the Muslim Brotherhood. Initially, Hamas was discreetly supported by Israel, as a counter-balance to the secular Palestine Liberation Organization (PLO) to prevent the creation of an independent Palestinian state. In the 2006 Palestinian legislative election, Hamas secured a majority in the Palestinian Legislative Council by campaigning on promises of a corruption-free government and advocating for resistance as a means to liberate Palestine from Israeli occupation. In the 2007 Battle of Gaza, Hamas seized control of the Gaza Strip from rival Palestinian faction Fatah. Hamas has since governed the territory separately from the Palestinian National Authority, and many countries and nongovernmental organizations have criticized it for human rights violations (see Criticism of Hamas). After Hamas's takeover, Israel significantly intensified existing movement restrictions and imposed a blockade of the Gaza Strip. Egypt also began its blockade of Gaza at this time. This was followed by multiple wars with Israel, including those in 2008–09, 2012, 2014, 2021, and an ongoing one since 2023, which began with the October 7 attacks.

Hamas has promoted Palestinian nationalism in an Islamic context and initially sought a state in all of former Mandatory Palestine. It began acquiescing to 1967 borders in the agreements it signed with Fatah in 2005, 2006 and 2007. From 2006 to 2009, Hamas made repeated offers of a long-term hudna (truce) without recognizing Israel if a Palestinian state was created based on the 1967 borders; this was seen by some as consistent with a two-state solution, while others state that Hamas retained the long-term objective of establishing one state in former Mandatory Palestine.. In 2017, Khaled Mashal, then Chairman of the Hamas Political Bureau, said: "Hamas rejects any idea except liberating the home soil entirely and completely."

In 2017, Hamas released a new charter that supported a Palestinian state within the 1967 borders without recognizing Israel. While the 1988 Hamas charter was widely described as antisemitic, Hamas's 2017 charter removed the antisemitic language and declared Zionists, not Jews, the targets of their struggle. It has been debated whether the charter has reflected an actual change in policy.

In terms of foreign policy, Hamas has historically sought out relations with Egypt, Iran, Qatar, Saudi Arabia, Syria and Turkey; some of its relations have been impacted by the Arab Spring. Hamas and Israel have engaged in the protracted Gaza–Israel conflict, as part of the broader Israeli–Palestinian conflict. Hamas has attacked Israeli civilians, including through suicide bombings as well as launching rockets at Israeli cities. Several countries have designated Hamas as a terrorist organisation. In 2018 and 2023, motions at the United Nations to condemn Hamas as a terrorist organization failed to meet the two-thirds threshold. (Note: A two-thirds majority was required for the motion to pass. 87 voted in favour, 58 against, 32 abstained and 16 did not vote.)

== Etymology ==
Hamas is an acronym of the Arabic phrase حركة المقاومة الإسلامية or Ḥarakah al-Muqāwamah al-ʾIslāmiyyah, meaning "Islamic Resistance Movement". This acronym, HMS, was glossed in the 1988 Hamas Covenant by the Arabic word ḥamās (حماس) which itself means "zeal", "strength", or "bravery".

== History ==
Hamas was established in 1987, and allegedly has its origins in Egypt's Muslim Brotherhood movement, which had been active in the Gaza Strip since the 1950s and gained influence through a network of mosques and various charitable and social organizations. Unlike other Palestinian factions, after the Israeli occupation of Gaza in 1967, the Brotherhood in Gaza refused to join the resistance boycott against Israel.

In the 1980s, Hamas emerged as a powerful political factor, challenging the influence of the PLO, whose Fatah faction it had played a core role in creating. In December 1987, the Brotherhood adopted a more nationalist and activist line under the name of Hamas.

Hamas was initially discreetly supported by Israel as a counter-balance to the secular PLO. During the 1990s and early 2000s, the organization conducted numerous suicide bombings and other attacks against Israel. In December 1992, Israeli authorities deported more than 400 Palestinians, suspected to be members of Hamas to Southern Lebanon.

In the Palestinian legislative election of January 2006, Hamas gained a large majority of seats in the Palestinian Parliament, defeating the ruling Fatah party. After the elections, conflicts arose between Hamas and Fatah, which they were unable to resolve. In June 2007, Hamas defeated Fatah in a series of violent clashes, and since that time Hamas has governed the Gaza portion of the Palestinian territories, while at the same time they were ousted from government positions in the West Bank. Israel and Egypt then imposed an economic blockade on Gaza and largely sealed their borders with the territory.

After acquiring control of Gaza, Hamas-affiliated and other militias launched rocket attacks upon Israel, which Hamas ceased in June 2008 following an Egyptian-brokered ceasefire. The ceasefire broke down late in 2008, with each side accusing the other of responsibility. In late December 2008, Israel attacked Gaza, withdrawing its forces in mid-January 2009. Since 2009, Hamas has faced multiple military confrontations with Israel, notably the 2012 and 2014 Gaza Wars, leading to substantial casualties. Hamas has maintained control over Gaza, often clashing with the Palestinian Authority led by Fatah. Efforts at reconciliation between Hamas and Fatah have seen limited success. Hamas continued to face international isolation and blockades, while engaging in sporadic rocket attacks and tunnel construction activities against Israel.

On 7 October 2023, Hamas and other Palestinian militants attacked Israel killing nearly 1,200 Israelis, about two thirds of them civilians. Approximately 250 Israeli civilians and soldiers were taken hostage and brought to the Gaza Strip, with the aim of securing the release of Palestinian prisoners in Israel (as part of a prisoner swap). Hamas said its attack was in response to Israel's continued occupation, blockade of Gaza, and settlements expansion, as well as alleged threats to the Al-Aqsa Mosque and the plight of Palestinians. There are also reports of sexual violence by Hamas militants, allegations that Hamas has denied. Israel responded by invading the Gaza Strip, killing over 70,000 Palestinians, 59.1% of them women, children and the elderly according to a peer-reviewed study in The Lancet.

In 2024, the International Criminal Court issued arrest warrants for three Hamas leaders, Yahya Sinwar, Ismail Haniyeh and Mohammed Deif, for their roles in the Oct. 7 killings in Israel. However, the court dropped the legal proceedings against all three men after Israel killed them, as detailed below. The court has also issued warrants for several Israeli leaders, for alleged war crimes and crimes against humanity for the activities in prosecuting the Israel-Hamas war. On 31 July 2024, Ismail Haniyeh was assassinated in Tehran, after attending the inauguration ceremony of Iranian president Masoud Pezeshkian. In August 2024, Yahya Sinwar, the leader of Hamas in Gaza, was elected chairman of the group, replacing Haniyeh. Per Hamas officials, he was elected due to his considerable popularity in the Arab and Islamic worlds following the 7 October attacks and his strong connections with Iran and the "Axis of Resistance," an informal Iranian-led political and military coalition. On 16 October 2024, IDF troops in southern Rafah on a routine patrol killed Sinwar in a chance encounter. In January 2025, the Wall Street Journal, citing Israeli sources, reported that Sinwar's younger brother, Mohammed Sinwar (aka Shadow), was leading Hamas. Its sources said that Israel were "working hard to find him" and that he (aka Shadow) along with Izz al-Din Haddad, of al-Qassam Brigades, were the two most senior commanders in the Gaza Strip. On 19 January 2025, a ceasefire between Hamas and Israel went into effect.

In January 2025, Hamas confirmed that its senior military chief, Mohammed Deif, was killed by Israel's military in July 2024. On 18 March 2025, Israel broke the ceasefire and shelling of the territory continued. In March 2025, Ismail Barhoum, a member of Hamas's political bureau was killed in an Israeli attack on Nasser Hospital in Khan Younis. In April 2025, according to the IDF, Yahya Fathi Abd al-Qader Abu Shaar, the head of Hamas' weapons smuggling network, was killed by the Israeli army. In May 2025, there were unconfirmed reports that Mohammed Sinwar, Hamas leader in Gaza and the brother of Yahya Sinwar, and Muhammad Shabana, commander of the Rafah Brigade, were killed by Israeli airstrike in the southern Gaza Strip. In June 2025, the Israeli military confirmed that it had identified the body of Mohammed Sinwar through DNA checks. In August 2025, Abu Obaida, the spokesman for Hamas's armed wing, was killed in an Israeli aerial attack. A third ceasefire came into effect on 10 October after Israel and Hamas agreed to phase one of a US-backed peace plan. On 6 July 2026, Hamas announced the resignation of its civil administration under the Gaza peace plan.

On 31 July 2026, Trump said that his Board of Peace had reached an agreement to disarm Hamas and other militant organisations in Gaza. Hamas leader Ghazi Hamad declared that "draft agreement" announced by Trump calls for the transfer of heavy weaponry in Gaza to a Palestinian administration following Israeli withdrawal from Gaza.

== Policies towards Israel and Palestine ==
Hamas' policy towards Israel has evolved. Historically, Hamas envisioned a Palestinian state on all of the territory that belonged to the British Mandate for Palestine (that is, from the Jordan River to the Mediterranean Sea), and in its 1988 Charter framed the Mandate Palestine as 'Islamic waqf' or endowment, under sovereignty of God. Hamas leaders have repeatedly emphasized they do not recognize Israel. Since then the movement has on several occasions accepted the 1967 borders in formal agreement (in 2005, 2006, and 2007) and in its 2017 charter. Some scholars interpret this acceptance of the 1967 borders as an implicit acknowledgement of another political entity on the opposite side, while others argue that Hamas still maintains the long-term goal of establishing a single state across the territory of the former Mandatory Palestine. There is ongoing debate about whether Hamas would formally recognize Israel as part of a future peace agreement. Some analysts suggest that the continued refusal to officially recognize Israel may function primarily as leverage in potential negotiations. Some scholars have also drawn parallels between Hamas’s position on recognizing Israel and the historical stance of Likud, which has not recognized a Palestinian state in the West Bank and Gaza.

=== Truce proposals ===
In 1999, Hamas offered a hudna (armistice) in return for complete Israeli withdrawal from the territories captured in the 1967 war and establishing a Palestinian state in West Bank and Gaza. Hamas's spokesperson, Ahmed Yousef, said that a "hudna" is more than a ceasefire and it "obliges parties to use the period to seek a permanent, non-violent resolution to their differences." Under Islamic international law, a hudna is a binding and the Qur'an prohibits its violation.

Hamas first proposed a hudna in 1999, on condition that Israel end the occupation of West Bank and Gaza Strip, evacuating all settlements, release all Palestinian prisoners, and recognise Palestine's right to self-determination. The 1999 proposal did not mention the issues of the return of the Palestinian refugees or Hamas's recognition of Israel, but interviewed Hamas leaders in 2010 added that the right of return should be accepted in principle by Israel (without direct actual implementation). Israel and Hamas should use the period of calm (armistice) for negotiating these two issues; if they would also be settled the temporary peace would convert into a permanent peace agreement. Hamas originally proposed a 10-year truce, but in the mid-2000s Sheikh Ahmed Yassin indicated that such truce could be extended for 30, 40, 50, or even 100 years, but it would never signal a recognition of Israel.

In 2006, Ismail Haniyeh, shortly after being elected as Prime Minister, sent messages both to US President George W. Bush and to Israel's leaders, offering a long-term truce. Neither Israel nor the United States responded. Haniyeh's proposal reportedly was a fifty-year armistice with Israel, if a Palestinian state is created along the 1967 borders with East Jerusalem as its capital. A Hamas official added that the armistice would renew automatically each time. In mid-2006, University of Maryland's Jerome Segal suggested that a Palestinian state within the 1967 borders and a truce for many years could be considered Hamas's de facto recognition of Israel. A similar proposal was once again offered by Hamas to Israel in November 2006.

In November 2008, in a meeting, on Gaza Strip soil, with 11 European members of parliaments, Hamas leader Ismail Haniyeh re-stated that Hamas was willing to accept a Palestinian state "in the territories of 1967" (Gaza Strip and West Bank), and offered Israel a long-term truce if Israel recognized the Palestinians' national rights; and stated that Israel rejected this proposal. A Hamas finance minister around 2018 contended that such a "long-term ceasefire as understood by Hamas and a two-state settlement are the same". A Hamas official told interviewers in the mid-2000s that having an indefinite truce with Israel doesn't contradict Hamas's lack of recognition of Israel, comparing it to the Irish Republican Army's willingness to accept a permanent armistice with the United Kingdom without recognizing the UK's sovereignty over Northern Ireland.

According to Leila Seurat, the movement's leaders consider that a traditional peace treaty like those in the Western tradition would be tantamount to surrender, while a truce would provide an alternative allowing them to wait for an inversion in the regional balance of power to the Palestinians' advantage. Abusada, a political scientist at Al Azhar University, wrote in 2008 that Hamas talks "of hudna [temporary ceasefire], not of peace or reconciliation with Israel. They believe over time they will be strong enough to liberate all historic Palestine." Some scholars have noted that alongside offering a long-term truce, Hamas retains its objective of establishing one state in former Mandatory Palestine.

=== Recognition of Israel ===
Hamas leaders have repeatedly emphasized they do not recognize Israel. In 1995 Hamas repeated its rejection of any recognition of Israel.

However, Hamas has also repeatedly accepted the 1967 borders in signed agreements (in 2005, 2006, and 2007) and in its 2017 charter. After Hamas won the 2006 elections, it did not implement the 1988 Charter as policy, and instead agreed to work with the existing Palestinian political system. Journalist Graham Usher interpreted this as meaning that, while Hamas does not consider Israel to be legitimate, it has accepted Israel as political reality. In the 2007 Mecca agreement, Hamas agreed to respect previous agreements between Fatah and Israel, including the Oslo Accords in which the PLO recognized Israel. Both in the 2007 agreement and in the 2006 Palestinian Prisoners' Document, Hamas agreed to a Palestinian state based on the 1967 borders. Scholars see this as "implicit" recognition of Israel because by accepting a Palestinian state limited to the 1967 borders, Hamas acknowledged the existence of an entity on the other side.

Mousa Abu Marzook, then the vice-president of Hamas' Political Bureau, explained his party's position in 2011: while Hamas did not recognize Israel as a state, it considered the existence of Israel as "amr waqi" (or fait accompli, meaning something that has happened and cannot be changed). He called this "de facto recognition" of Israel.

In 2017, Hamas once again accepted the 1967 borders in its new charter that "drop[ped] the call for the destruction of Israel from its manifesto". While it did not abrogate the old charter, Hamas leaders explained that "The original charter has now become a historical document and part of an earlier stage in our evolution. It will remain in the movement's bookshelf as a record of our past." Khaled Mashal stated that the new document reflected "our position for now."

Some scholars see Hamas' acceptance of the 1967 borders as a tacit acceptance of another entity on the other side. Tareq Baconi, a former analyst at the International Crisis Group currently at Al-Shabaka think-tank, notes that Hamas has said it would accept mutual recognition of Israel in any consensus peace deal approved by other Palestinian parties and the population in a referendum. To explain why it withholds formal recognition, Baconi argues that Hamas has learned from the fact that, in the 1993 Oslo Accords, the PLO made a "historic concession" in recognizing Israel on 78% of the land of historic Palestine (along the 1967 borders), but was unable to convince Israel to recognize Palestine on the remaining 22% of the land. Having already recognized Israel, the PLO was unable to use recognition to extract any further concessions from Israel, thus according to Baconi the lesson for Hamas was that you can't negotiate from a position of weakness, and the issue of formal recognition of Israel is kept as bargaining chip for negotiations. Others state that Hamas retains the long-term objective of establishing one state in former Mandatory Palestine.

Whether Hamas would recognize Israel in a future peace agreement is debated. Some argue that the long-term objective and lack of official recognition of Israel is merely maintained as a bargaining chip for future negotiations. Some scholars have compared Hamas's lack of recognition of Israel to Likud's lack of recognition of a Palestinian state in the West Bank and Gaza. Some commentators, including Baconi, Ilan Pappé, Noam Chomsky and Rashid Khalidi have argued that Hamas has offered more to the Israelis than Israeli major parties including Likud have offered in return to the Palestinians, both with its de facto recognition of the 1967 borders and its pledge to accept the recognition of Israel in any future peace deal that has the consensus and approval of the Palestinian parties and population.

=== Evolution of positions ===
==== 1988–1992 (first charter) ====
In its early days, Hamas functioned as a social-religious charity center. Its members armed themselves for the ongoing resistance against the Israeli occupation of the Palestinian territories, and in August 1988 published their first charter in which Hamas stated that "Israel" should be "eliminated" through a "clash with the enemies", a "struggle against Zionism" and "conflict with Israel". They wrote that 'Palestine', that is all of the territory that belonged to the British Mandate for Palestine (that is, from the Jordan River to the Mediterranean Sea), should be "liberated" from "Zionism" and transformed into an Islamic Waqf (Islamic charitable endowment) in which "followers of all religions can coexist in security and safety". Practically speaking, Hamas is and was at war with Israel's army (later also attacking Israeli civilians) since the spring of 1989, initially as part of the First Intifada, a general protest movement that gradually turned more riotous and violent.

==== 1992–2005 ====
In 1999, the Hamas leadership, in a memorandum to European diplomats, proposed a long-term ceasefire with Israel in return for Israeli withdrawal of military troops and civilian illegal settlements from West Bank and Gaza Strip, release of all Palestinian prisoners, and the right of Palestinian self-determination (see also section Truce proposals). Sheikh Ahmed Yassin, founder of Hamas, who was assassinated by Israel in 2004, at unreported date has offered Israel a ten-year hudna (truce, armistice) in return for establishment of a Palestinian state in the West Bank and Gaza. Yassin later added, the hudna could be renewed, even for longer periods, but would never signal a recognition of Israel.

In 2005, Hamas signed the Palestinian Cairo Declaration, which confirms "the right of the Palestinian people to resistance in order to end the occupation, establish a Palestinian state with full sovereignty with Jerusalem as its capital" (etc.), aiming to reconcile several Palestinian factions but not describing specific steps or strategies towards Israel.

==== 2006–2007: 1967 borders and a truce ====
In March 2006, after winning an absolute majority in the 2006 Palestinian legislative elections, Hamas published its government program in which Hamas claimed sovereignty for the Palestinian territories but did not repeat its claim to all of mandatory Palestine, instead declared their willingness to have contacts with Israel "in all mundane affairs: business, trade, health, and labor". The program further stated: "The question of recognizing Israel is not the jurisdiction of one faction, nor the government, but a decision for the Palestinian people." Since then until today, spokesmen of Hamas seem to disagree about their attitudes towards Israel, and debates are running as to whether the original 1988 Hamas charter has since March 2006 become obsolete and irrelevant or on the contrary still spells out Hamas's genuine and ultimate goals (see: 1988 Hamas charter, § Relevance).

The March 2006 Hamas legislative program was further explained on 6 June 2006 by Hamas' MP Riad Mustafa: "Hamas will never recognize Israel", but if a popular Palestinian referendum would endorse a peace agreement including recognition of Israel, "we would of course accept their verdict".

Also on 6 June 2006, Ismail Haniyeh, senior political leader of Hamas and at that time Prime Minister of the Palestinian National Authority, sent a letter to US President George W. Bush (via University of Maryland's Jerome Segal), stating: "We are so concerned about stability and security in the area that we don't mind having a Palestinian state in the 1967 borders and offering a truce for many years", and asking Bush for a dialogue with the Hamas government. A similar message he sent to Israel's leaders. Haniyeh had reportedly proposed a fifty-year armistice. Neither Washington nor Israel replied. Nuancing sheikh Ahmed Yassin's statements before 2004 about a hudna (truce) with Israel (see above), Hamas's (former) senior adviser Ahmed Yousef has said (at unknown date) that a "hudna" (truce, armistice) is more than a ceasefire and "obliges parties to use the period to seek a permanent, non-violent resolution to their differences."

On 28 June 2006, Hamas signed the second version of (originally) 'the Palestinians' Prisoners Document' which supports the quest for a Palestinian state "on all territories occupied in 1967". This document also recognized the PLO as "the sole legitimate representative of the Palestinian people", and states that "the negotiations" should be conducted by PLO and President of the Palestinian National Authority and eventual agreements must be ratified by either the Palestinian National Council or a general referendum "held in the homeland and the Diaspora". Leila Seurat also notes that this document "implicitly recognized the June 1967 borders, agreed on the construction of a Palestinian state with Jerusalem as a capital and accepted limitations to the resistance in the territories occupied in 1967", and was produced following consultations with the entire Political Bureau.

In an August 2006 interview with The New York Times, Ismail Haniyeh, senior political leader of Hamas and then Prime Minister of the Palestinian National Authority, said: "We have no problem with a sovereign Palestinian state over all our lands within the 1967 borders, living in calm." In November 2006, Hamas again proposed a temporary but long lasting truce to Israel in exchange for a Palestinian state in the 1967 borders.

In February 2007, Hamas signed the Fatah–Hamas Mecca Agreement, stressing "the importance of national unity as basis for (...) confronting the occupation" and "activate and reform the PLO", but without further details about how to confront or deal with Israel. At the time of signing that 2007 agreement, Mousa Abu Marzook, Deputy Chairman of the Hamas Political Bureau, underlined his view of the Hamas position: "I can recognize the presence of Israel as a fait accompli (amr wâqi') or, as the French say, a de facto recognition, but this does not mean that I recognize Israel as a state". More Hamas leaders, through the years, have made similar statements.

In June 2007, Hamas ousted the Fatah movement from the Gaza Strip, took control there, and since then Hamas occasionally fired rockets from the Gaza Strip on Israel, purportedly to retaliate Israeli aggression against the people of Gaza.

==== 2008–2016 ====
In April 2008, former US President Jimmy Carter met with Khaled Mashal, the recognized Hamas leader since 2004. Mashal said to Carter, Hamas would "accept a Palestinian state on the 1967 borders" and accept the right of Israel "to live as a neighbour" if such a deal would be approved by a referendum among the "Palestinians". Nevertheless, Mashal did not offer a unilateral ceasefire (as Carter had suggested him to do). The US State Department showed utter indifference for Mashal's new stance; Israel's Prime Minister Ehud Olmert even refused to meet with Carter in Jerusalem, not to mention paying attention to the new Hamas stance.

On 19 June 2008, Hamas and Israel agreed to a six-month cease-fire, which Hamas declared finished at 18 December amidst mutual accusations of breaching the agreed conditions.

Meanwhile, in November 2008, in a meeting with 11 European members of parliaments, Hamas senior official Ismail Haniyeh repeated what he had written in June 2006 to U.S. President George W. Bush but with one extra condition: "the Hamas government had agreed to accept a Palestinian state that followed the 1967 borders and to offer Israel a long-term hudna (truce), if Israel recognized the Palestinians' national rights" – a proposal which he said Israel had declined.

In September 2009, Ismail Haniyeh, head of the Hamas government in the Gaza Strip, wrote to UN Secretary General Ban Ki-moon that Hamas would support any steps leading to a Palestinian state on the 1967 borders: "We would never thwart efforts to create an independent Palestinian state with borders [from] June 4, 1967, with Jerusalem as its capital."

In May 2010, Khaled Mashal, chairman of the Hamas Political Bureau (thus Hamas' highest leader), again stated that a state "Israel" living next to "a Palestinian state on the borders of 1967" would be acceptable for Hamas – but only if a referendum among "the Palestinian people" would endorse this arrangement. In November 2010, Ismail Haniyeh, (Note: Haniyeh at the time was the (overall) Prime Minister of the State of Palestine but as such was dismissed by President Abbas in 2007; nevertheless he remained head of the Hamas government in the Gaza Strip.) also proposed a Palestinian state on 1967 borders, though added three further conditions: "resolution of the issue of refugees", "the release of Palestinian prisoners", and "Jerusalem as its capital"; and he made the same reservation as Mashal in May 2010 had made, that a Palestinian referendum needed to endorse this arrangement.

On 1 December 2010, Ismail Haniyeh (senior Hamas leader, see above), in a news conference in Gaza, repeated his November 2010 message: "We accept a Palestinian state on the borders of 1967, with Jerusalem as its capital, the release of Palestinian prisoners, and the resolution of the issue of refugees," but only if such arrangement would be endorsed by "a referendum" held among all Palestinians: in Gaza, West Bank, and the diaspora.

In May 2011, Hamas and Fatah signed an agreement in Cairo, agreeing to form a ('national unity') government and appoint the Ministers "in consensus between them", but it contained no remarks about how to confront or deal with Israel. In February 2012, Hamas and Fatah signed the Fatah–Hamas Doha Agreement, agreeing (again) to form an interim national consensus government, which (again) did not materialize.

Still in February 2012, according to the Palestinian Authority (either the Fatah branch in West Bank or the Hamas branch in Gaza), Hamas forswore the use of violence against Israel ("ceasefire", an Israeli news website called it), followed by a few weeks without violence between Hamas and Israel. But violence between Israel and Palestinian militant groups, in the Gaza Strip and southern Israel, also involving Hamas, would soon resume.

==== 2017–6 Oct 2023 (new charter) ====
On 1 May 2017, after much internal discussion, Hamas and its Hamas Political Bureau chief Khaled Mashal published "A Document of General Principles and Policies", also known as the 2017 Hamas charter. In the new charter Hamas accepts a Palestinian state in the 1967 borders, without recognizing Israel. When asked, Hamas leaders explained that "The original charter has now become a historical document and part of an earlier stage in our evolution. It will remain in the movement's bookshelf as a record of our past." Khaled Mashal stated that the new document reflected "our position for now." However, Hamas fell short of formally repudiating the original 1988 charter. According to some analysts Hamas did not formally revoke the old charter so as to not alienate some of its base members, who it feared might join rival Islamist factions.

Around 2018, a Hamas finance minister has suggested that a "long-term ceasefire as understood by Hamas [hudna] and a two-state settlement are the same". In 2021 Hamas organized and financed a conference among 250 Gaza citizens about the future management of the State of Palestine following the takeover of Israel which was predicted to come soon. According to the conclusions of the conference, the Jewish Israeli fighters would be killed, while the peaceful individuals could be integrated or be allowed to leave. At the same time the highly skilled and educated would be prevented from leaving. In 2020 Ismail Haniyeh said in an interview that one of the principles of Hamas was "Palestine from the sea to the river." In 2022, Yahya Sinwar cautioned Israelis that Hamas would one day "march through your walls to uproot your regime."

==== 7 Oct 2023–present ====
Approximate presence of Hamas militants (blue) on 7–9 October 2023

In the October 7 attacks, Hamas and associates murdered 767 civilians, killed a further 376 security personnel of the state of Israel and abducted 251 people from Israel to the Gaza Strip. Israel retaliated with warfare in the Gaza Strip, aiming at Hamas militants but also harming much civilian infrastructure and directly killing tens of thousands of civilians, more than 80 percent of casualties. A number of conflicting statements since then were made by Hamas senior leaders regarding the Hamas policy towards Israel.

On 24 October, Ghazi Hamad—member of the decision-making Hamas Political Bureau—explained the 7 October attack: "Israel is a country that has no place on our land. We must remove that country because it constitutes a security, military and political catastrophe to the Arab and Islamic nation". "We are called a nation of martyrs and we are proud to sacrifice martyrs". Hamad called the creation of the Jewish state "illogical": "(...) We are the victims of the occupation. Therefore, nobody should blame us for the things we do".

On 1 November 2023, Ismail Haniyeh, then incumbent highest Hamas leader (but assassinated by Israel 31 July 2024), stated that if Israel agreed to a ceasefire in the Gaza war, if humanitarian corridors would be opened, and aid would be allowed into Gaza, Hamas would be "ready for political negotiations for a two-state solution with Jerusalem as the capital of Palestine". Haniyeh also praised the support of movements in Yemen, Iraq, Syria and Lebanon for the Palestinian struggle.

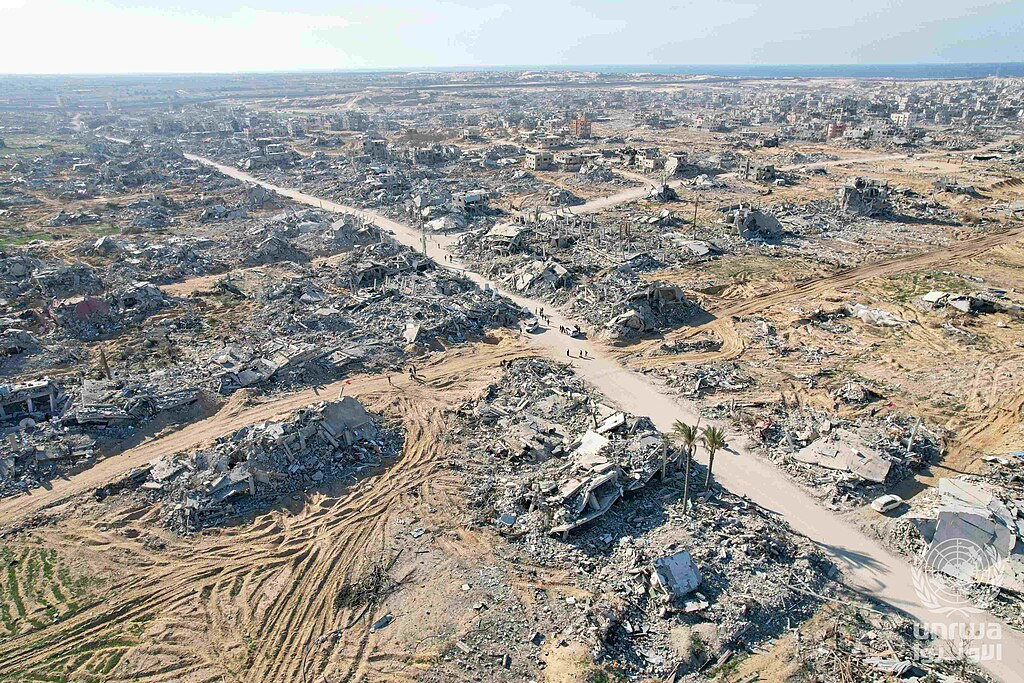
Ruins of Rafah in January 2025 after Israel's Rafah offensive

In January 2024 Khaled Mashal, a former Hamas leader, slighted "The West" and "the two-state solution", saying "The 1967 borders represent 21% of Palestine, which is practically one fifth of its land, so this cannot be accepted", and adding that "our right in Palestine from the sea to the river" cannot be waived. However, he reiterated that Hamas "accepts a state on the 1967 borders with Jerusalem as its capital, with complete independence and with the right of return without recognising the legitimacy of the Zionist entity."

Hamas Member of Parliament Khalil al-Hayya, also deputy chairman of the Hamas Political Bureau, told the Associated Press in April 2024 that Hamas is willing to agree to a truce of five years or more with Israel and that it would lay down its weapons and convert into a political party if an independent Palestinian state is established along pre-1967 borders. The Associated Press considered this a "significant concession", but presumed that Israel would not even want to consider this scenario following the October 2023 attack.

==== Reactions ====
A number of authors have noted that the vision of a single state from the river to the sea Hamas articulated in its original 1988 charter mirrors the vision of Likud regarding the same territory.

Several other authors have interpreted the 1988 Hamas charter as a call for "armed struggle against Israel".

In 2009, Taghreed El-khodary and Ethan Bronner, writing in the New York Times, said that Hamas' position is that it doesn't recognize Israel's right to exist, but is willing to accept as a compromise a Palestinian state based on the 1967 borders.

Writing for Middle Eastern Studies in 2000, Imad Alsoos says that Hamas has both a short and long-term objective: "The short-term objective aims to establish a Palestinian state in Gaza and the West Bank, while the long-term objective still strives to liberate Mandate Palestine in its entirety. Establishing a Palestinian state in the West Bank and Gaza (as part of a hudna deal) would be Hamas's interim solution, during which Israel would not be recognized.

In mid-2006, University of Maryland's Jerome Segal suggested that a Palestinian state within the 1967 borders and a truce for many years could be considered Hamas's de facto recognition of Israel.

Journalist Zaki Chehab wrote in 2007 that Hamas's public concessions following the 2006 elections were "window-dressing" and that the organisation would never recognize Israel's right to exist.

As to the question whether Hamas would be capable to enter into a long-term non-aggression treaty with Israel without being disloyal to their understanding of Islamic law and God's word, The Atlantic magazine columnist Jeffrey Goldberg in January 2009 stated: "I tend to think not, though I've noticed over the years a certain plasticity of belief among some Hamas ideologues. Also, this is the Middle East, so anything is possible".

Professor Mohammed Ayoob in his 2020 book, while discussing the 2017 Hamas charter, stated that "acceptance of the 1967 borders can be interpreted as a de facto acceptance of the preconditions for a two-state solution".

== Religious policy ==
=== Gaza Strip ===
Hamas' Change and Reform electoral list for the 2006 Palestinian legislative election included a Palestinian Christian candidate, Hosam al-Taweel, running as an independent for the Christian reserved seat in Gaza City. (Note: His name has been spelled: Hussam al-Tawil, Hossam Al-Tawil, or Hosam al-Taweel.) Hosam al-Taweel won the seat, one of six seats reserved for Palestine's Christian minority, with the highest winning vote of the six elected, due to the endorsement of Hamas and other nationalist groups.

The gender ideology outlined in the Hamas charter, the importance of women in the religious-nationalist project of liberation is asserted as no lesser than that of males. Their role was defined primarily as one of manufacturing males and caring for their upbringing and rearing, though the charter recognized they could fight for liberation without obtaining their husband's permission and in 2002 their participation in jihad was permitted. The doctrinal emphasis on childbearing and rearing as woman's primary duty is not so different from Fatah's view of women in the First Intifada and it also resembles the outlook of Jewish settlers, and over time it has been subjected to change. A few were worried about imposition of Islamic dress codes, but most Christians in the Gaza Strip said these worries were baseless and they were not worried about the Hamas government.

In 1989, during the First Intifada, a few Hamas followers campaigned for polygamy, and insisted women stay at home and be segregated from men. In the course of this campaign, women who chose not to wear the hijab were verbally and physically harassed, with the result that the hijab was being worn 'just to avoid problems on the streets'. The harassment dropped drastically when, after 18 months, the Unified National Leadership of the Uprising (UNLU) condemned it. Polygamy is practised in some Bedouin communities in Israel, and some Palestinians with Israeli citizenship, particularly in the Negev desert (Arabic pronunciation: Naqab) surrounding the Gaza Strip.

Since Hamas took control of the Gaza Strip in 2007, some of its members have attempted to impose Islamic dress or the hijab head covering on women. The government's "Islamic Endowment Ministry" has deployed Virtue Committee members to warn citizens of the dangers of immodest dress, card playing, and dating. There are no government laws imposing dress and other moral standards, and the Hamas education ministry reversed one effort to impose Islamic dress on students. There has also been successful resistance to attempts by local Hamas officials to impose Islamic dress on women. Hamas officials deny having any plans to impose Islamic law, one legislator stating that "What you are seeing are incidents, not policy," and that Islamic law is the desired standard "but we believe in persuasion".

In 2013, UNRWA canceled its annual marathon in Gaza after Hamas prohibited women from participating in the race.

=== In the West Bank ===
In 2005, the human rights organization Freemuse released a report titled "Palestine: Taliban-like attempts to censor music", which said that Palestinian musicians feared that harsh religious laws against music and concerts will be imposed since Hamas group scored political gains in the Palestinian Authority local elections of 2005.

The attempt by Hamas to dictate a cultural code of conduct in the 1980s and early 1990s led to a violent fighting between different Palestinian sectors. Hamas members reportedly burned down stores that stocked videos they deemed indecent and destroyed books they described as "heretical".

In 2005, an outdoor music-and-dance performance in Qalqiliya was suddenly banned by the Hamas-led municipality, for the reason that such an event would be "haram", i.e. forbidden by Islam. The municipality also ordered that music no longer be played in the Qalqiliya zoo, and mufti Akrameh Sabri issued a religious edict affirming the municipality decision. In response, the Palestinian national poet Mahmoud Darwish warned that "There are Taliban-type elements in our society, and this is a very dangerous sign."

The Palestinian columnist Mohammed Abd Al-Hamid, a resident of Ramallah, wrote that this religious coercion could cause the migration of artists, and said "The religious fanatics in Algeria destroyed every cultural symbol, shattered statues and rare works of art and liquidated intellectuals and artists, reporters and authors, ballet dancers and singers—are we going to imitate the Algerian and Afghani examples?"

=== Erdoğan's Turkey as a role model ===
Some Hamas members have stated that the model of Islamic government that Hamas seeks to emulate is that of Turkey under the rule of Recep Tayyip Erdoğan. The foremost members to distance Hamas from the practices of the Taliban and to publicly support the Erdoğan model were Ahmed Yousef and Ghazi Hamad, advisers to Prime Minister Hanieh. Yusuf, the Hamas deputy foreign minister, reflected this goal in an interview with a Turkish newspaper, stating that while foreign public opinion equates Hamas with the Taliban or al-Qaeda, the analogy is inaccurate. Yusuf described the Taliban as "opposed to everything", including education and women's rights, while Hamas wants to establish good relations between the religious and secular elements of society and strives for human rights, democracy and an open society. According to professor Yezid Sayigh of King's College in London, how influential this view is within Hamas is uncertain, since both Ahmad Yousef and Ghazi Hamad were dismissed from their posts as advisers to Hamas Prime Minister Ismail Hanieh in October 2007. Both have since been appointed to other prominent positions within the Hamas government. Khaled al-Hroub of the West Bank-based and anti-Hamas Palestinian daily Al Ayyam added that despite claims by Hamas leaders that it wants to repeat the Turkish model of Islam, "what is happening on the ground in reality is a replica of the Taliban model of Islam."

== Charter and policy documents ==
=== 1988 charter ===
Hamas published its charter in August 1988, wherein it defined itself as a chapter of the Muslim Brotherhood and its desire to establish "an Islamic state throughout Palestine". The foundational document was written by a single individual, an "old guard" member of the Muslim Brotherhood in Gaza isolated from the outside world, and it was made public without going through the usual prior consultation, revision or consensus process, which Hamas leaders regretted in later years. It was then signed on 18 August 1988. It compares Israeli attacks on civilians to that by Nazi Germany. The charter also claims all of historical Palestine but promises religious coexistence under Islam's rule. Article 6 states that the movement's aim is to "raise the banner of Allah over every inch of Palestine, for under the wing of Islam followers of all religions can coexist in security and safety where their lives, possessions and rights are concerned". The charter rejects a two-state solution, stating that the conflict cannot be resolved "except through jihad".

Many scholars have pointed out that both the 1988 Hamas's charter and the Likud party platform sought full control of the land, thus denouncing the two-state solution.

=== 2017 charter ===
In May 2017, Hamas published a document titled "A Document of General Principles and Policies". While this policy document was much shorter than the 1988 charter, and Hamas leaders stated that it did not replace the 1988 charter, it covers some of the same topics and is referred to as the "2017 charter". It accepted a Palestinian state in the 1967 borders, without recognizing Israel, which is seen by many as being consistent with a two-state solution, while others state that Hamas retains the long-term objective of establishing one state in former Mandatory Palestine. The charter also argued that armed resistance to occupation is supported by international law. Hamas has described these changes as adaptation within a specific context, as opposed to abandonment of its principles.

While the 1988 Hamas charter was widely described as antisemitic, Hamas's 2017 charter removed the antisemitic language and said Hamas's struggle was with Zionists, not Jews. Some sources maintain its condemnation of Zionists is antisemitic: it describes Zionism as the enemy of all Muslims and a danger to international security, what author J.S. Spoerl in 2020 has disqualified as "hardly (...) a serious repudiation of anti-Semitism". Hroub, though not responding directly, disagrees, writing that the 2017 document shows that Hamas is stressing the nationalist/resistance aspects of its purpose, providing a "clear assertion of the right to a national liberation struggle on the basis of international law." Similarly, scholar Joas Wagemakers argues that the 2017 charter clearly omits all antisemitic elements and instead takes a nationalist viewpoint. Scholar Leïla Seurat and analyst Tareq Baconi also stress that the charter broadens the movement's tactics by restricting the primacy of armed struggle and complementing it with peaceful forms of resistance.

== Organization ==
=== Leadership and structure ===
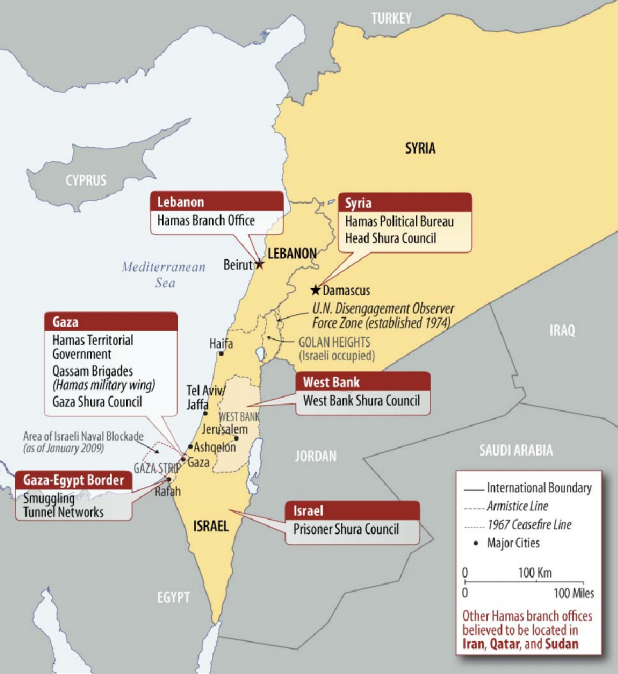
Map of key Hamas leadership nodes. 2010.

Hamas inherited from its predecessor a tripartite structure under a Shura Council: social services; religious training; military operations. Traditionally it had four distinct functions: (a) a charitable social welfare division (dawah); (b) a military division for procuring weapons and undertaking operations (al-Mujahideen al Filastinun); (c) a security service (Jehaz Aman); and (d) a media branch (A'alam). Hamas has both an internal leadership within the West Bank and the Gaza Strip, and an external leadership, split between a Gaza group directed by Mousa Abu Marzook from his exile first in Damascus and then in Egypt, and a Kuwaiti group (Kuwaidia) under Khaled Mashal. The Kuwaiti group of Palestinian exiles began to receive extensive funding from the Gulf States after its leader Mashal broke with Yasser Arafat's decision to side with Saddam Hussein in the Invasion of Kuwait, with Mashal insisting that Iraq withdraw. On 6 May 2017, Hamas' Shura Council chose Ismail Haniyeh to become the new leader, to replace Mashal.

The exact structure of the organization is unclear as it is shrouded in a veil of secrecy in order to conceal operational activities. Formally, Hamas maintains the wings are separate and independent, but this has been questioned. It has been argued that its wings are both separate and combined for reasons of internal and external political necessity. Communication between the political and military wings of Hamas is made difficult by the thoroughness of Israeli intelligence surveillance and the existence of an extensive base of informants. After the assassination of Abdel Aziz al-Rantisi the political direction of the militant wing was diminished and field commanders were given wider discretion over operations.

==== Shura Council and Political Bureau ====
Hamas's overarching governing body is the Majlis al-Shura (Shura Council), based on the Quranic concept of consultation and popular assembly (shura), which Hamas leaders argue provides for democracy within an Islamic framework. As the organization grew more complex and Israeli pressure increased, the Shura Council was renamed the General Consultative Council, with members elected from local council groups. The council elects the 15-member Political Bureau (al-Maktab al-Siyasi) that makes decisions for Hamas. Representatives come from Gaza, the West Bank, leaders in exile and Israeli prisons. The Political Bureau was based in Damascus until January 2012, when Hamas's support for the Syrian opposition to Bashar al-Assad during the Syrian civil war led to the office's relocation to Qatar.

=== Finances and funding ===
As of 2023, half of Hamas funding came from transfers from the Palestinian Authority. Other sources include taxes in Gaza, transfers from Qatar, Iran and charities. Hamas assumed the administration of Gaza's waqf properties, endowments which extend over 10% of real estate in Gaza, with 2,000 acres of agricultural land held in religious trusts, together with shops, rentable apartments and public buildings. As of 2023 Hamas has an investment portfolio worth US$0.5-$1 billion, including assets in Sudan, Turkey, Saudi Arabia, Algeria and the UAE. Hamas has denied this. In 2024, financial activity in Gaza was carried out via money changers to bypass international financial authorities. The European Council added six people to its sanctions list for helping fund Hamas, including an Iranian Revolutionary Guard Corps official. Three businesses were added, including companies in Spain and Sudan that functioned as fronts.

In the first five years of the 1st Intifada, the Gaza economy, 50% of which depended on external sources of income, plummeted by 40% as Israel closed its labor market, and remittances from the Palestinian expatriates in Gulf countries dried up following the 1991–92 Gulf War. At the 1993 Philadelphia conference, Hamas leaders' statements indicated that they read George H. W. Bush's New World Order as embodying a tacit aim to destroy Islam, and therefore funding should focus on enhancing the Islamic roots of Palestinian society and promoting jihad, which also means zeal for social justice, in the occupied territories. Hamas became fastidious about maintaining separate resourcing for its military, political and social services branches. It has a holding company in East Jerusalem (Beit al-Mal), a 20% stake in Al Aqsa International Bank which served as its financial arm, the Sunuqrut Global Group and the al-Ajouli money-changing firm.

By 2011, Hamas's budget, US$70 million, derived 85% from foreign, rather than Palestinian sources. Only two Israeli-Palestinian sources figure in a list seized in 2004, while other contributors were donor bodies located in Jordan, Qatar, Kuwait, Saudi Arabia, Britain, Germany, the US, UAE, Italy and France. Much of the money comes from sources that direct their assistance to what Hamas describes as its charitable work for Palestinians, but investments in support of its ideological position are also relevant, with Gulf States and Saudi Arabia prominent in the latter. Hamas taps money from corporations, criminal organizations and financial networks that support terror. It is alleged it engages in cigarette and drug smuggling, multimedia copyright infringement and credit card fraud. The US, Israel and the EU have shut down charities and organs that channel money to Hamas, such as the Holy Land Foundation for Relief and Development.

About half of Hamas's funding came from Persian Gulf states up to the mid-2000s. Saudi Arabia supplied half the Hamas budget in the early 2000s, but, under US pressure, cut its funding by cracking down on Islamic charities and private donor transfers in 2004, which by 2006 drastically reduced the flow. Iran and Syria, in the aftermath of Hamas's 2006 electoral victory, stepped in to fill the shortfall. Saudi funding remained supportive of Hamas as a Sunni group but chose to provide more assistance to the PNA, the electoral loser, when the EU responded to the outcome by suspending its aid. During the 1980s, Iran provided 10% of Hamas's funding. It accounted for $22 million, over a quarter of Hamas's budget, by the late 2000s. Iran preferred direct financing to operative groups rather than charities, requiring video proof of attacks. Much of Iran's funding is channeled through Hezbollah. After 2006, Iran's willingness to fill the gap created by the drying up of Saudi funding also reflected the geopolitical tensions between the two, since, though Shiite, Iran was supporting a Sunni group closely linked with the Saudi kingdom. The US imposed sanctions on Iran's Bank Saderat, alleging it had funneled hundreds of millions to Hamas. The US has expressed concerns that Hamas obtains funds through Palestinian and Lebanese sympathizers of Arab descent in the Foz do Iguaçu area of Latin America, an area associated with arms trading, drug trafficking, contraband, the manufacture of counterfeit goods, money-laundering and currency fraud. Confirmatory information of Hamas operational presence there is lacking.

After 2009, sanctions on Iran made funding difficult, forcing Hamas to rely on religious donations in the West Bank, Qatar, and Saudi Arabia. Tens of millions of dollars raised in the Gulf states were transferred through the Rafah Border Crossing. These were insufficient to cover the cost of governing the Strip and running the al-Qassam Brigades, and when tensions arose with Iran over support of Assad in Syria, Iran dropped its financial assistance to the government, restricting its funding to the military wing, which meant a drop from $150 million in 2012 to $60 million the following year. A further drop occurred in 2015 when Hamas criticised Iran's role in the Yemeni Civil War.

In 2017, the PA government imposed sanctions against Gaza, including cutting off salaries to PA employees. The PA said it would not pay for the electricity and fuel that Israel supplies to the Gaza Strip, but backtracked. The Israeli government has allowed millions of dollars from Qatar to be funneled through Israel to Hamas, to replace the millions of dollars the PA had stopped transferring to Hamas. Israeli Prime Minister Benjamin Netanyahu explained that letting it go through Israel meant it could not be used for terrorism: "Now that we are supervising, we know it's going to humanitarian causes."

=== Social services wing ===
Hamas developed its social welfare programme by replicating the model established by Egypt's Muslim Brotherhood. For Hamas, charity and the development of one's community are both prescribed by religion and to be understood as forms of resistance. In Islamic tradition, dawah (lit. transl. "the call to God") obliges the faithful to reach out to others by both proselytising and by charitable works, and typically the latter center on the mosques which make use of both waqf endowment resources and charitable donations to fund grassroots services such as nurseries, schools, orphanages, soup kitchens, women's activities, library services and even sporting clubs within a larger context of preaching and political discussions. In the 1990s, some 85% of its budget was allocated to the provision of social services. Hamas has been called perhaps the most significant social services actor in Palestine. By 2000, Hamas or its affiliated charities ran roughly 40% of the social institutions in the West Bank and Gaza and, with other Islamic charities, by 2005, was supporting 120,000 individuals with monthly financial support in Gaza. Part of the appeal of these institutions is that they fill a vacuum in the administration by the PLO of the Palestinian territories, which had failed to cater to the demand for jobs and broad social services, and is widely viewed as corrupt. As late as 2005, the budget of Hamas, drawing on global charity contributions, was mostly tied up in covering running expenses for its social programmes, which extended from the supply of housing, food and water for the needy to more general functions such as financial aid, medical assistance, educational development and religious instruction. A certain accounting flexibility allowed these funds to cover both charitable causes and military operations, permitting transfer from one to the other.

The dawah infrastructure itself was understood, within the Palestinian context, as providing the soil from which a militant opposition to the occupation would flower. (Note: 'In a 1995 lecture, Sheikh Jamil Hamami, a party to the foundation of Hamas and a senior member of its West Bank leadership, expounded the importance of Hamas' dawa infrastructure as the soil from which militancy would flower.') In this regard it differs from the rival Palestinian Islamic Jihad which focuses less on its social welfare network, and relies on spectacular attacks to recruit adherents. In 2007, through funding from Iran, Hamas managed to allocate at a cost of $60 million, monthly stipends of $100 for 100,000 workers, and a similar sum for 3,000 fishermen laid idle by Israel's blockade, plus grants totalling $45 million to detainees and their families. Matthew Levitt argues that Hamas grants to people are subject to a rigorous cost-benefit analysis of how beneficiaries will support Hamas, with those linked to militant activities receiving more than others. Israel holds the families of suicide bombers accountable and bulldozes their homes, whereas the families of Hamas activists who have been killed or wounded during militant operations are given an initial, one-time grant varying between $500–$5,000, together with a $100 monthly allowance. Rent assistance is also given to families whose homes have been destroyed by Israeli bombing though families unaffiliated with Hamas are said to receive less.

Until 2007, these activities extended to the West Bank, but, after a PLO crackdown, now continue exclusively in the Gaza Strip. After the 2013 Egyptian coup d'état deposed the elected Muslim Brotherhood government of Mohamed Morsi in 2013, Hamas found itself in a financial straitjacket and has since endeavoured to throw the burden of responsibility for public works infrastructure in the Gaza Strip back onto the Palestinian National Authority, but without success.

=== Media ===
==== Al-Aqsa TV ====
Al-Aqsa TV is a television channel founded by Hamas. The station began broadcasting in the Gaza Strip on 9 January 2006, less than three weeks before the Palestinian legislative elections. It has shown television programs, including some children's television, which deliver antisemitic messages. Hamas has stated that the television station is "an independent media institution that often does not express the views of the Palestinian government headed by Ismail Haniyeh or of the Hamas movement", and that Hamas does not hold antisemitic views. The programming includes ideologically tinged children's shows, news talk, and religiously inspired entertainment. According to the Anti-Defamation League, the station promotes terrorist activity and incites hatred of Jews and Israelis. Al-Aqsa TV is headed by the controversial Fathi Ahmad Hamad, chairman of al-Ribat Communications and Artistic Productions—a Hamas-run company that also produces Hamas's radio station, Voice of al-Aqsa, and its biweekly newspaper, The Message. Hamad has made a number of controversial comments, including a speech in which he reportedly stated: "you have Jews everywhere and we must attack every Jew on the globe by way of slaughter and killing."

==== Al-Fateh magazine ====
Al-Fateh ("the conqueror") was a Hamas children's magazine, published biweekly in London, and posted online. It began publication in September 2002, and its 108th issue was released in September 2007. The magazine featured stories, poems, riddles, and puzzles, and stated it is for "the young builders of the future".

The magazine had been accused of antisemitism, with the magazine repeatedly calling Jews things such as: "the most despicable of God’s creatures", "the lowest of the human race", "like a cancer which has to be gotten rid of". The magazine also holds an anti-western and revanchist position, claiming that because of its morally justified cause the muslim world will triumph over the western world and that the western world will collapse.

==== Website ====
In June 2015, Hamas launched an English-language version of its official website. Hamas' official website at hamas.ps was active as of September 2023, though it has since been taken offline. In November 2023, Israeli social media accounts shared hamas.com, a website with videos and pictures of the October 7 attacks released by the IDF that was claimed to be created by Hamas. Fact-checking website Misbar reported that Hamas had confirmed on Telegram that its official website is hamas.ps.

==== Social media ====
Hamas has traditionally presented itself as a voice of suffering of the Palestinian people. According to Time magazine, a new social media strategy was employed in the wake of the October 7 attacks: Hamas asserted itself as the dominant militant force in the Middle East by recording and broadcasting the brutality of their attacks.

According to Dr. Harel Horev, historian and researcher of Palestinian affairs at Tel Aviv University, Hamas has used social media to dehumanize Israelis/Jews. According to his research, Hamas took over the most popular accounts on Palestinian networks in a covert manner that did not reveal its involvement. This control gave it the ability to significantly influence the Palestinian discourse online through content that denies the humanity and right to life of Israelis. These included posters, songs and videos glorifying threats; computer games that encourage the murder of Jews; training videos for carrying out effective and indiscriminate stabbing and shooting attacks; and anti-Semitic cartoons as a central means of dehumanizing the Israeli/Jew in the Palestinian online discourse.

Following pressure from pro-Israel advocacy groups and tech giants Apple and Google, Telegram has blocked several Hamas-linked channels that violated app store policies regarding violent content.

=== Internal security ===
The General Security Service, formally part of the Hamas political party, operates akin to a governmental body within Gaza. Under the direct oversight of Hamas leader Yahya Sinwar, it conducts extensive surveillance on Palestinians, compiling files on various individuals including journalists and government critics. This secret police force relies on a network of informants and employs tactics such as censorship and surveillance to maintain control. Before the conflict with Israel, the unit reportedly had a monthly budget of $120,000 and consisted of 856 personnel, including more than 160 individuals paid to spread Hamas propaganda and conduct online attacks against opponents.

Other powerful internal security bodies in Gaza include Military Intelligence, which focuses on Israel, and the Internal Security Service, an arm of the Interior Ministry.

During the COVID-19 pandemic in Palestine Hamas implemented restrictions in a "flattening the curve" approach. The restrictions imposed were similar to most western countries, and more relaxed than the zero COVID policy implemented by China and their neighbors.

== Qassam Brigades (military wing) ==
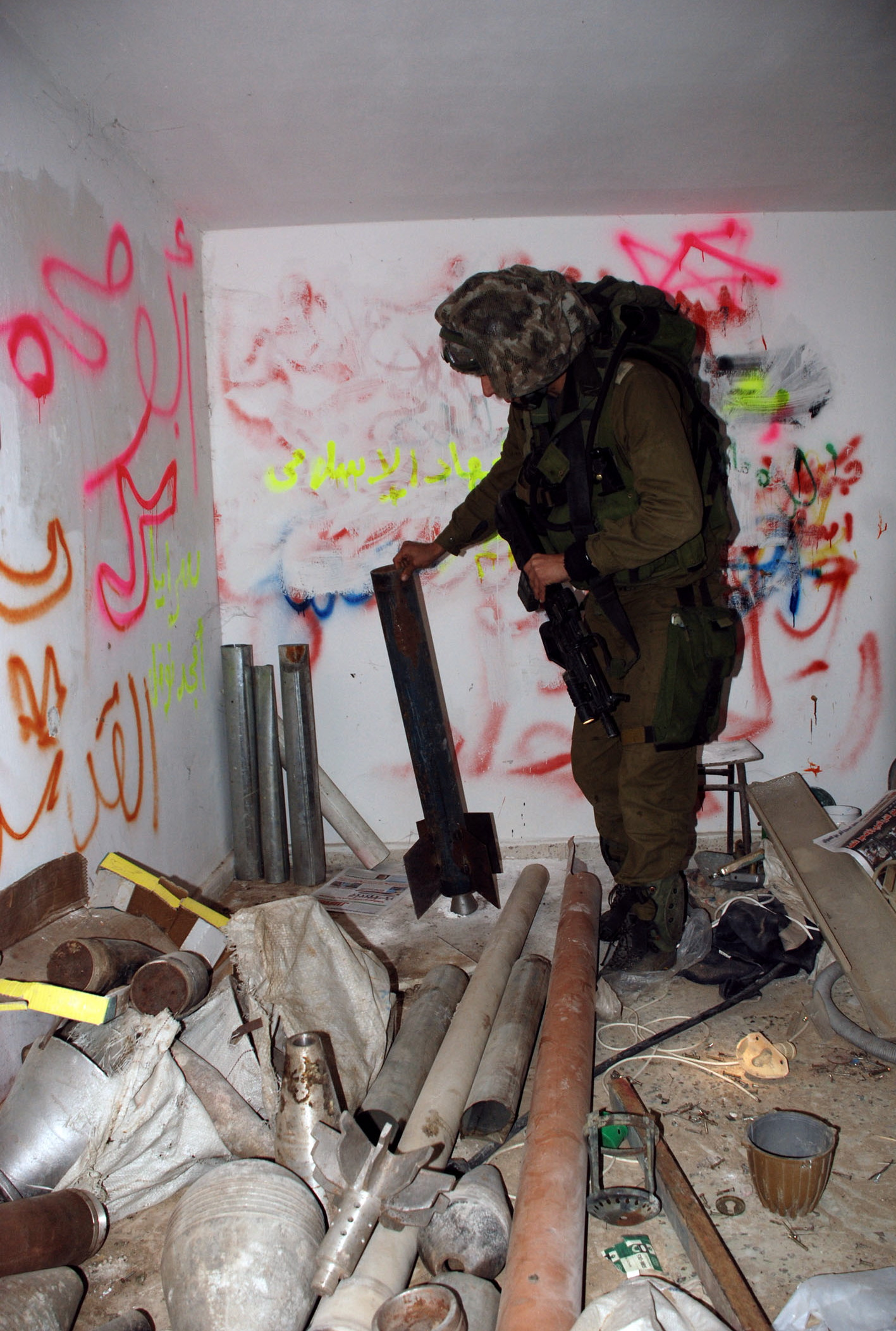
Weapons found in a mosque during Operation Cast Lead, according to the IDF.

The Izz ad-Din al-Qassam Brigades is Hamas' military wing. While the number of members is known only to the Brigades leadership, Israel estimates the Brigades have a core of several hundred members who receive military style training, including training in Iran and in Syria (before the Syrian Civil War). Additionally, the brigades have an estimated 10,000–17,000 operatives, other sources say 15,000–40,000 militants, forming a backup force whenever circumstances call for reinforcements for the Brigade. Recruitment training lasts for two years. The group's ideology outlines its aim as the liberation of Palestine and the restoration of Palestinian rights under the dispensations set forth in the Qur'an, and this translates into three policy priorities:

To evoke the spirit of Jihad (Resistance) among Palestinians, Arabs, and Muslims; to defend Palestinians and their land against the Zionist occupation and its manifestations; to liberate Palestinians and their land that was usurped by the Zionist occupation forces and settlers.

According to its official stipulations, the Izz ad-Din al-Qassam Brigades' military operations are to be restricted to operating only inside Palestine, engaging with Israeli soldiers, (Note: 'Consistent attacks on army units by Hamas activists are as new as the use of anti-tank missiles against civilian homes by the Israeli military.') and in exercising the right of self-defense against armed settlers. They are to avoid civilian targets, to respect the enemy's humanity by refraining from mutilation, defacement or excessive killing, and to avoid targeting Westerners either in the occupied zones or beyond.

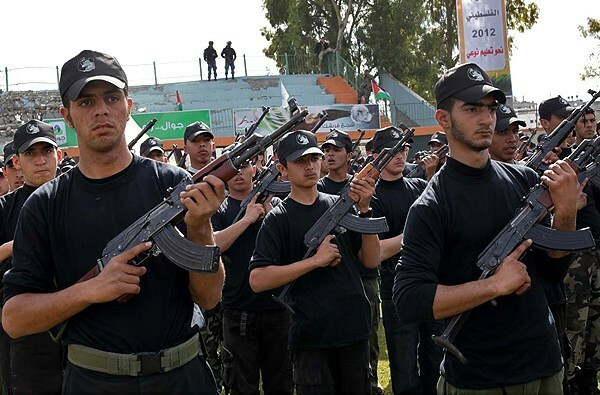
Exercise of al-Qassam Brigades in Gaza City, 27 January 2013

Down to 2007, the Brigades are estimated to have lost some 800 operatives in conflicts with Israeli forces. The leadership has been consistently undermined by targeted assassinations. Aside from Yahya Ayyash (5 January 1996), it has lost Emad Akel (24 November 1993), Salah Shehade (23 July 2002), Ibrahim al-Makadmeh (8 March 2003), Ismail Abu Shanab (21 August 2003), Ahmed Yassin (22 March 2004), and Abdel Aziz al-Rantisi (17 April 2004).

The Izz ad-Din al-Qassam Brigades groups its fighters in 4–5 man cells, which in turn are integrated into companies and battalions. Unlike the political section, which is split between an internal and external structure, the Brigades are under a local Palestinian leadership, and disobedience with the decisions taken by the political leadership have been relatively rare.

Although the Izz al-Din al-Qassam Brigades are an integral part of Hamas, the exact nature of the relationship is hotly debated. They appear to operate at times independently of Hamas, exercising a certain autonomy. Some cells have independent links with the external leadership, enabling them to bypass the hierarchical command chain and political leadership in Gaza. Ilana Kass and Bard O'Neill, likening Hamas's relationship with the Brigades to the political party Sinn Féin's relationship to the military arm of the Irish Republican Army, quote a senior Hamas official as stating: "The Izz al-Din al-Qassam Brigade is a separate armed military wing, which has its own leaders who do not take their orders from Hamas and do not tell us of their plans in advance." (Note: Matthew Levitt on the other hand claims that Hamas's welfare institutions act as a mere façade or front for the financing of terrorism, and dismisses the idea of two wings as a 'myth'. He cites Ahmed Yassin stating in 1998: "We can not separate the wing from the body. If we do so, the body will not be able to fly. Hamas is one body.")

=== Gaza forces, October 2023 ===
During the Gaza war, the IDF published its intelligence about the Hamas military in the Strip. They put the strength of the Qassam Brigades there at the start of the war at 30,000 fighters, organized by area in five brigades, consisting in total of 24 battalions and c. 140 companies. Each regional brigade had a number of strongholds and outposts, and included specialised arrays for rocket firing, anti-tank missiles, air defenses, snipers, and engineering.

== Symbols ==
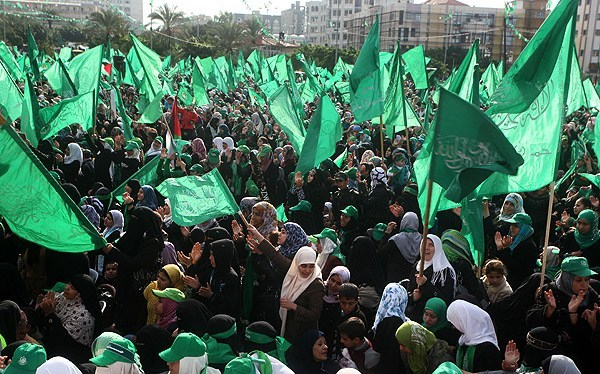
Hamas flags at the 25th anniversary rally in 2012

The flag of Hamas is a green field (a traditionally respected color in Islam) charged in the middle with the writing of the Shahada, an Islamic statement of faith, in white calligraphic script: "There is no god but God" and "Muhammad is the messenger of God".

The emblems of their political and military wings are distinct from each other. The emblem of Hamas' political wing features Islamic and militaristic motifs. It shows two crossed swords in front of the central building of the Al-Aqsa mosque complex, in Jerusalem. The mosque is framed by two Palestinian flags that feature the two statements that comprise the Shahada. Above Al Aqsa is a map of Palestine, matching the borders of Mandatory Palestine. Immediately below the Dome it reads "Palestine" and below that in the green banner: "Islamic Resistance Movement – Hamas". The emblem of their Al-Qassam Brigades militant wing does not include a map or a Palestinian flag, the militant wing emblem is a cartoon drawing of a man holding an M16 rifle and a Quran, with his face mostly covered by a black and white Palestinian keffiyeh. He is standing in front of a green flag and the golden dome of the Al-Aqsa mosque, but the building is more stylised than it is in the political wing emblem.

== Violence ==
Hamas has used both political activities and violence in pursuit of its goals. For example, while politically engaged in the 2006 Palestinian Territories parliamentary election campaign, Hamas stated in its election manifesto that it was prepared to use "armed resistance to end the occupation".

Hamas has repeatedly justified its violence by arguing "People under occupation have a right to resist that occupation". Hamas also argues its armed resistance only started after decades of Israeli occupation. In October 1994, in a response to Israel's crackdown on Hamas militants following a suicide bombing on a Tel Aviv bus, Hamas promised retaliation: "Rabin must know that Hamas loves death more than Rabin and his soldiers love life."

From 2000 to 2004, Hamas was responsible for killing nearly 400 Israelis and wounding more than 2,000 in 425 attacks, according to the Israeli Ministry of Foreign Affairs. From 2001 through May 2008, Hamas launched more than 3,000 Qassam rockets and 2,500 mortar attacks into Israel.

=== Attacks on civilians ===
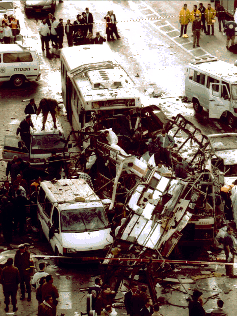
Aftermath of 1996 Jaffa Road bus bombings in which 26 people were killed

Hamas have committed massacres targeting Israeli civilians. Hamas's most deadly suicide bombing was the Passover Massacre, which occurred in a Netanya hotel on 27 March 2002, at a Passover Seder in which 30 people were killed and 140 were wounded.

Hamas has defended suicide attacks as a legitimate aspect of its asymmetric warfare against Israel. In 2003, according to Stephen Atkins, Hamas resumed suicide bombings in Israel as a retaliatory measure after the failure of peace talks and an Israeli campaign targeting members of the upper echelon of the Hamas leadership. (Note: 'This ceasefire ended when Israel started targeting Hamas leaders for assassination in July 2003. Hamas retaliated with a suicide bombing in Israel on 19 August 2003, that killed 20 people, including 6 children. Since then Israelis have mounted an assassination campaign against the senior leadership of Hamas that has killed 13 Hamas members, including Ismail Abu Shanab, one of the most moderate leaders of Hamas. ... After each of these assassinations, Hamas has sent a suicide bomber into Israel in retaliation.') In a 2002 report, Human Rights Watch stated that Hamas leaders "should be held accountable" for "war crimes and crimes against humanity" committed by the al-Qassam Brigades.

In 2008, Hamas leader Khaled Mashal, offered that Hamas would attack only military targets if the IDF would stop causing the deaths of Palestinian civilians. Following a 19 June 2008, ceasefire, the al-Qassam Brigades ended its rocket attacks and arrested Fatah militants in Gaza who had continued sporadic rocket and mortar attacks against Israel. The al-Qassam Brigades resumed the attacks after the 4 November Israeli incursion into Gaza.

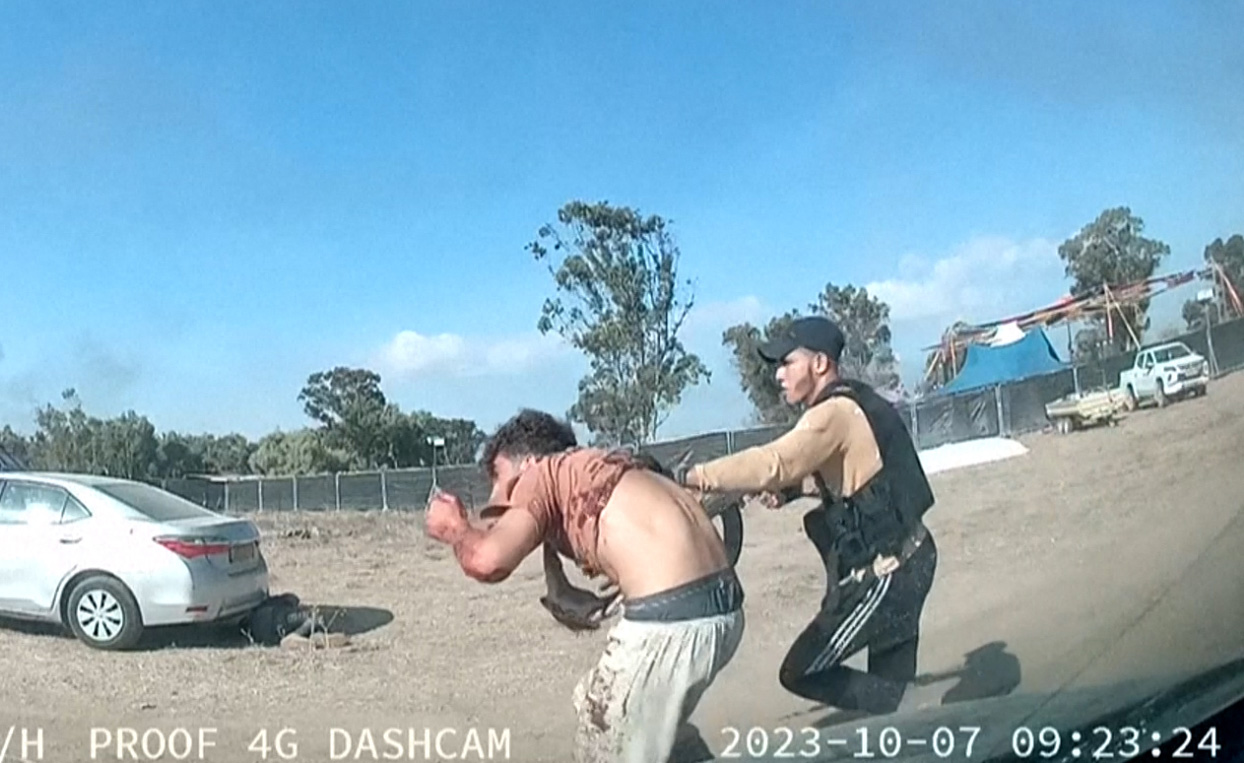
The 2023 Re'im music festival massacre left 364 people dead with many others wounded or taken hostage

During the October 7 attacks, Hamas infiltrated homes, shot civilians en masse, and took scores of Israeli civilians and soldiers as hostages into Gaza. According to Human Rights Watch, the deliberate targeting of civilians, indiscriminate attacks, and taking of civilians as hostages amount to war crimes under international humanitarian law. During its October 2023 offensive against Israel, Hamas massacred 364 people at the Re'im music festival, while abducting others. During the same offensive, it also was reported that Hamas had massacred the population of the Kfar Aza kibbutz. About 10 percent of the residents of the Be'eri kibbutz were killed. Hamas militants attacked the Psyduck festival, that took place near kibutz Nir Oz, killing 17 Israeli partygoers. Video footage shows children being deliberately killed during the kibbutz attacks, as well as what appears to be an attempt to decapitate a living person using a garden hoe. Forensic teams who examined bodies of victims said many bodies showed signs of torture as well as sexual and gender-based violence, and testimonies to this effect were also collected by Israeli police. Haaretz later reported that forensic pathologists who examined bodies of the victims taken the Shura Base for identification found "no signs on any of those bodies attesting to sexual relations having taken place or of mutilation of genitalia." Not all bodies could be fully examined given the lack of forensic pathologists, and for some conclusions could not be drawn given their deteriorated state. Israeli forensic pathologists in charge of the process clarified later that all bodies had been examined, and some were disfigured or burned. Some of the testimonies were later proven to be false. Detailed reports by the UN and The Times concluded that Israel's claims about the scale and formally sanctioned, systematic nature of sexual assaults did not stand up to scrutiny.

=== Rocket attacks on Israel ===
According to a 2010 Human Rights Watch report, 15 civilians had been killed in rocket attacks by Hamas and other groups since 2001. Hamas has claimed that its rockets are only aimed at military targets, and that the low quality of its weapons was the cause of the inadvertent civilian casualties. According to Human Rights Watch, statements by Hamas leaders shed doubt on these claims and indicate that targeting of civilians was not accidental. From January 2009, following Operation Cast Lead, Hamas largely stopped launching rocket attacks on Israel and has on at least two occasions arrested members of other groups who have launched rockets, "showing that it has the ability to impose the law when it wants". In February 2010, Hamas issued a statement regretting any harm that may have befallen Israeli civilians as a result of Palestinian rocket attacks during the Gaza war. It maintained that its rocket attacks had been aimed at Israeli military targets but lacked accuracy and hence sometimes hit civilian areas. Israel responded that Hamas had boasted repeatedly of targeting and murdering civilians in the media.

According to one report, commenting on the 2014 conflict, "nearly all the 2,500–3,000 rockets and mortars Hamas has fired at Israel since the start of the war seem to have been aimed at towns", including an attack on "a kibbutz collective farm close to the Gaza border", in which an Israeli child was killed. Former Israeli Lt. Col. Jonathan D. Halevi stated that "Hamas has expressed pride in aiming long-range rockets at strategic targets in Israel including the nuclear reactor in Dimona, the chemical plants in Haifa, and Ben-Gurion Airport", which "could have caused thousands" of Israeli casualties "if successful".

In July 2008, Barack Obama, then the Democratic presidential candidate, said: "If somebody was sending rockets into my house, where my two daughters sleep at night, I'm going to do everything in my power to stop that, and I would expect Israelis to do the same thing." On 28 December 2008, Secretary of State Condoleezza Rice said in a statement: "the United States strongly condemns the repeated rocket and mortar attacks against Israel." On 2 March 2009, Secretary of State Hillary Clinton condemned the attacks.

On 7 October 2023, Hamas claimed responsibility for a barrage of missile attacks originating from the Gaza Strip.

=== Guerrilla warfare ===
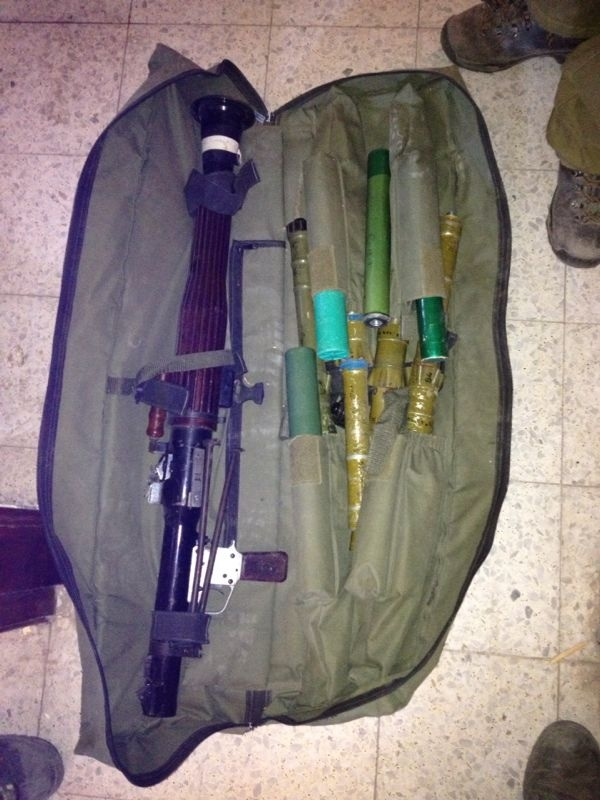
Hamas anti-tank rockets, captured by Israel Defense Forces during Operation Protective Edge

Hamas has made use of guerrilla tactics in the Gaza Strip and to a lesser degree the West Bank. It has adapted these techniques over the years since its inception.

According to a 2006 report by rival Fatah party, Hamas had smuggled between several hundred and 1,300 tons of advanced rockets, along with other weaponry, into Gaza. Hamas has used IEDs and anti-tank rockets against the IDF in Gaza. The latter include standard RPG-7 warheads and home-made rockets such as the Al-Bana, Al-Batar and Al-Yasin. The IDF has a difficult, if not impossible, time finding hidden weapons caches in Palestinian areas.

=== Extrajudicial killings of rivals ===
In addition to killing Israeli civilians and armed forces, Hamas has also murdered suspected Palestinian Israel collaborators and Fatah rivals. According to the Associated Press, collaborating with Israel is a crime punishable by death in Gaza. Hundreds of Palestinians were executed by both Hamas and Fatah during the First Intifada. In the wake of the 2006 Israeli conflict with Gaza, Hamas was accused of systematically rounding up, torturing and summarily executing Fatah supporters suspected of supplying information to Israel. Human Rights Watch estimates several hundred Gazans were "maimed" and tortured in the aftermath of the conflict. Seventy-three Gazan men accused of "collaborating" had their arms and legs broken by "unidentified perpetrators", and 18 Palestinians accused of helping Israel were executed by Hamas security officials in the first days of the conflict. In November 2012, Hamas's Izzedine al-Qassam brigade publicly executed six Gaza residents accused of collaborating with Israel. According to the witnesses, six alleged informers were shot dead one by one in Gaza City, while the corpse of the sixth victim was tied by a cable to the back of a motorcycle and dragged through the streets. In 2013, Human Rights Watch issued a statement condemning Hamas for not investigating and giving a proper trial to the six men. Their statement was released the day before Hamas issued a deadline for "collaborators" to turn themselves in, or they will be pursued "without mercy". During the 2014 Israel-Gaza conflict, Hamas executed at least 23 accused collaborators after three of its commanders were assassinated by Israeli forces, with Amnesty International also reporting instances of torture used by Hamas forces. An Israeli source denied that any of the commanders had been targeted on the basis of human intelligence.

Killings of unarmed people have also occurred during Hamas-Fatah clashes. NGOs have cited a number of summary executions as particular examples of violations of the rules of warfare, including the case of Muhammad Swairki, 28, a cook for Palestinian Authority Chairman Mahmoud Abbas's presidential guard, who was thrown to his death, with his hands and legs tied, from a 15-story apartment building in Gaza City. Hamas security forces reportedly shoot and torture Palestinians who opposed Hamas rule in Gaza. In one case, a Palestinian had criticized Hamas in a conversation on the street with some friends. Later that day, more than a dozen armed men with black masks and red kaffiyeh took the man from his home, and brought him to a solitary area where they shot him three times in the lower legs and ankles. The man told Human Rights Watch that he was not politically active.

On 14 August 2009, Hamas fighters stormed the Mosque of extremist cleric Abdel-Latif Moussa. The cleric was protected by at least 100 fighters from Jund Ansar Allah ("Army of the Helpers of God"), an Islamist group with links to Al-Qaeda. The resulting battle left at least 13 people dead, including Moussa and six Hamas fighters, and 120 people injured.

According to Palestinian president Mahmoud Abbas, during 2014 Israel–Gaza conflict, Hamas killed more than 120 Palestinian youths for defying house arrest imposed on them by Hamas, in addition to 30–40 Palestinians killed by Hamas in extrajudicial executions after accusing them of being collaborators with Israel. Referring to the killing of suspected collaborators, a Shin Bet official stated that "not even one" of those executed by Hamas provided any intelligence to Israel, while the Shin Bet officially "confirmed that those executed during Operation Protective Edge had all been held in prison in Gaza in the course of the hostilities".

== Criticism ==
Aside from its use of political violence in pursuit of its goals, Hamas has been widely criticised for a variety of reasons, including the use of antisemitic hate speech by its representatives; its frequent calls for the destruction of Israel by force; its reported use of human shields and child combatants as part of its military operations; and its restriction of political freedoms within the Gaza Strip and human rights abuses.

After the start of the 2023 war, the European Parliament passed a motion stating the need for Hamas to be eliminated, with US president Joseph R. Biden having expressed the same sentiment. Hamas was accused of having committed genocide against Israelis on 7 October 2023 by 240 legal experts, including jurists and academics.

== Statements on Jews ==
Article 7 of the 1988 charter has been interpreted critically as "openly dedicat[ing] Hamas to genocide against the Jewish people". Authors have characterized the violent language against all Jews in the original Hamas charter as genocidal, incitement to genocide, and antisemitic. The charter attributes collective responsibility to all Jews, not just Israelis, for various global issues, including both World Wars. Antisemitism scholar Jeffrey Herf, writing in The American Interest, said that the charter "echoes" Nazi propaganda in claiming that Jews profited during World War II. Jeffrey Goldberg, editor-in-chief of The Atlantic magazine and others have compared statements in the 1988 charter with those that appear in The Protocols of the Elders of Zion.

Ahmed Yassin, the founder of Hamas, responded to accusations that "hamas hate Jews" by stating in a 1988 interview, "we don't hate Jews and fight Jews because they are Jewish."

Esther Webman of the Project for the Study of Anti-Semitism at Tel Aviv University wrote in 1998 that Hamas leaflets during the First Intifada "contained the most extreme anti-Semitic statements" of all Palestinian factions, but argued that "anti-Semitism is not the main tenet of Hamas ideology." The tone and casting of the Israeli-Palestinian conflict as part of an eternal struggle between Muslim and Jews by the Hamas Covenant had become an obstacle for the movement to be able to take part in diplomatic forums involving Western nations.

Hamas has promoted Holocaust denial. It described Nazi Germany's genocide of European Jews as "so-called" and "an alleged and invented story with no basis" in a 2000 press release. In 2003, Hamas co-founder and deputy leader Abdel Aziz al-Rantisi said that "Zionists were behind the Nazis' murder of many Jews." In 2009, Hamas was involved in a dispute with the United Nations Relief and Works Agency (UNRWA) over the inclusion of Holocaust education in Gaza, with Hamas's Popular Committees for Refugees describing the Holocaust as "a lie invented by the Zionists".

In an op-ed in The Guardian in January 2006, Khaled Meshaal, the chief of Hamas's political bureau, said that the nature of Israeli–Palestinian conflict was not religious but political and that Hamas has "no problem with Jews who have not attacked us". In 2008, in another Guardian op ed, Basem Naim, Minister of Health and Information in Gaza, rejected the accusation that Hamas is “motivated by anti-Jewish sentiment”. He said that Hamas does not deny the Nazi Holocaust, which he characterises as “one of the most abhorrent crimes in modern history. We condemn it as we condemn every abuse of humanity and all forms of discrimination on the basis of religion, race, gender or nationality.” He also said that Hamas rejects “the exploitation of the Holocaust by the Zionists to justify their crimes”.

Hamas' 2017 charter removed the explicitly antisemitic language of the original, stating that their struggle is against Zionism and not Jews, while rejecting persecution or denial of rights of any human being on nationalist, religious, or sectarian grounds. It also says that the Jewish question, antisemitism, and the persecution of Jews stem from European history rather than Arab or Muslim heritage, while advancing goals for a Palestinian state that many see as consistent with a two-state solution.

In January 2025, Al Jazeera Arabic broadcast an operational order attributed to Mohammed Deif, commander of Hamas's military wing, dated October 5, 2023. The document invoked what it described as God's promise to "bring disgrace upon the Jews and destroy them at the hands of God's servants" (بإساءة وجه اليهود وإهلاكهم على أيدي عباد الله), alongside the anticipated liberation of Al-Aqsa Mosque and Jerusalem.

== Electoral performance ==
=== Legislative Council ===
In the 2006 Palestinian legislative election, the party won 44.45% of the vote, becoming the largest party of the Legislative Council.

Election	Leading candidate	Votes	%	Seats	+/–	Position
2006	Ismail Haniyeh	440,409	44.45	74 / 132	New	1st

== Public opinion ==
Public opinions of Hamas deteriorated after it took control of the Gaza Strip in 2007. Prior to the takeover, 62% of Palestinians had held a favorable view of the group, while a third had negative views. According to a 2014 Pew Research survey just prior to the 2014 Israel–Gaza conflict, only about a third had positive opinions, and more than half viewed Hamas negatively. Furthermore, 68% of Israeli Arabs viewed Hamas negatively.

Outside Palestine, in the wider region, in July 2014, 65% of Lebanese viewed Hamas negatively. In Jordan and Egypt, roughly 60% viewed Hamas negatively, and in Turkey, 80% had a negative view of Hamas. In Tunisia, 42% had a negative view of Hamas, while 56% of Bangladeshis and 44% of Indonesians had a negative opinion of Hamas. A March/April 2023 poll found that 60% of Jordanians viewed Hamas firing rockets at Israel at least somewhat positively.

A poll conducted in 2021 found that 53% of Palestinians believed Hamas was "most deserving of representing and leading the Palestinian people". Only 14% preferred Abbas's Fatah party. At the same time, a majority of Gazans also saw Hamas as corrupt, but were frightened to criticize the group. Polls conducted in September 2023 found that support for Hamas among Palestinians stood at around 27–31%.

Following the October 7 attacks and the Gaza war, Hamas's popularity in Gaza fell while increasing in the West Bank. A May 2024 poll by the Arab World for Research and Development, a West Bank-based independent organization, found only a quarter of Gazans supported Hamas, while 76% of Palestinians in the West Bank views Hamas positively. Views on the attack among Gazans plummeted from 50% support to 24% in favor from a poll taken in November 2023 to the May 2024 poll. According to a poll conducted by The Washington Institute for Near East Policy from 14 November to 6 December 2023, 40% of Saudi participants expressed a positive view of Hamas, 95% of Saudis did not believe that Hamas killed civilians during the October 7 attacks, and only 16% of Saudis said Hamas should accept a two-state solution. A poll conducted by the Palestinian Center for Policy and Survey Research between 22 and 25 October 2025, found that 70% of Palestinians from the West Bank and Gaza opposed the disarmament of Hamas, even if that means a return to Israeli attacks.

A press release by the People's Company for Polls and Survey Research, dated August 12th 2026, reported that overall support for Hamas has fallen to 24% among Palestinians, Hamas leader Khalil al-Hayya was polling at 16% for Palestinian President, 20% believe Hamas won the Gaza War while 15% believed Israel won and 60% believe no one won.

== Foreign relations ==
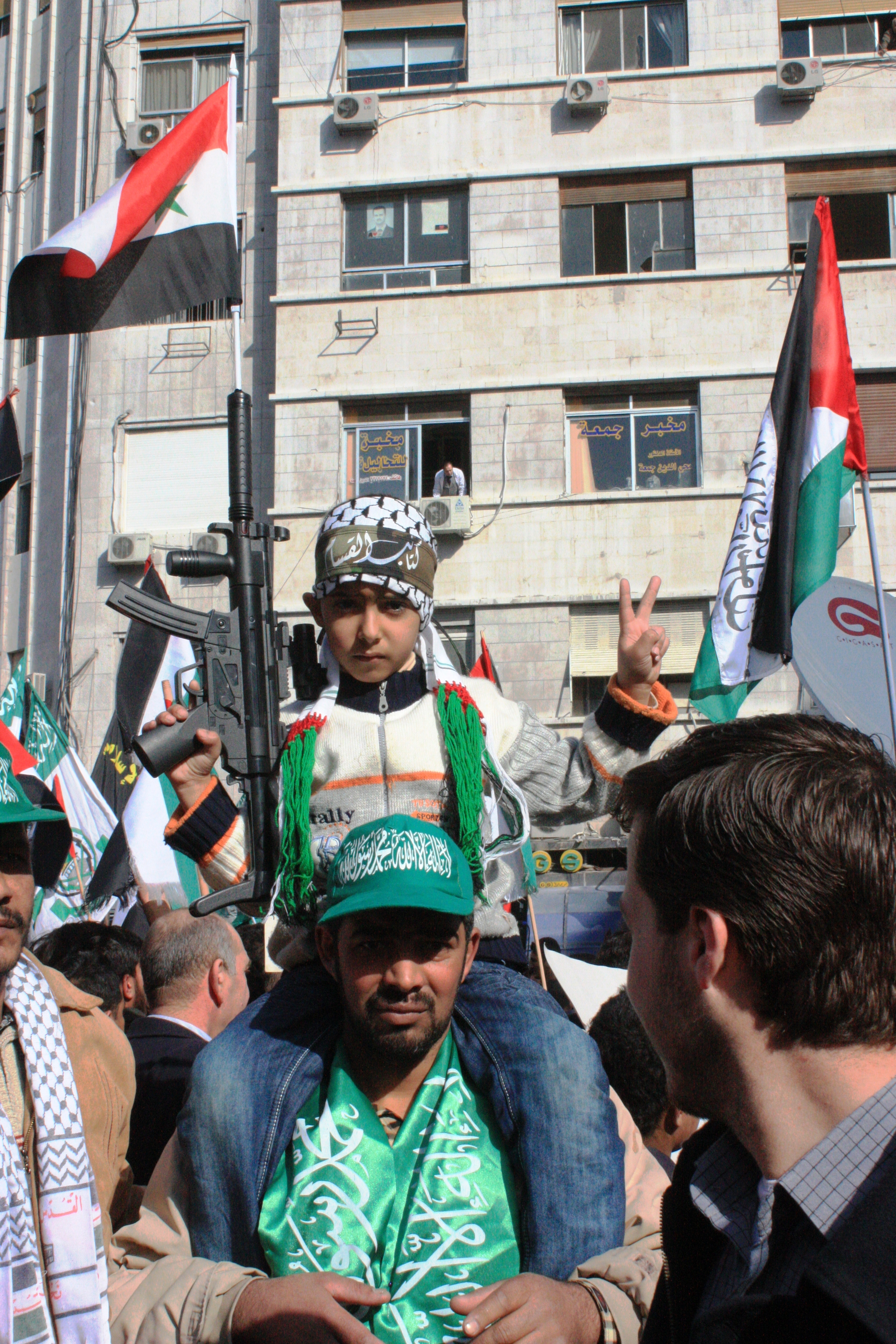
Pro-Hamas rally in Damascus, Syria.

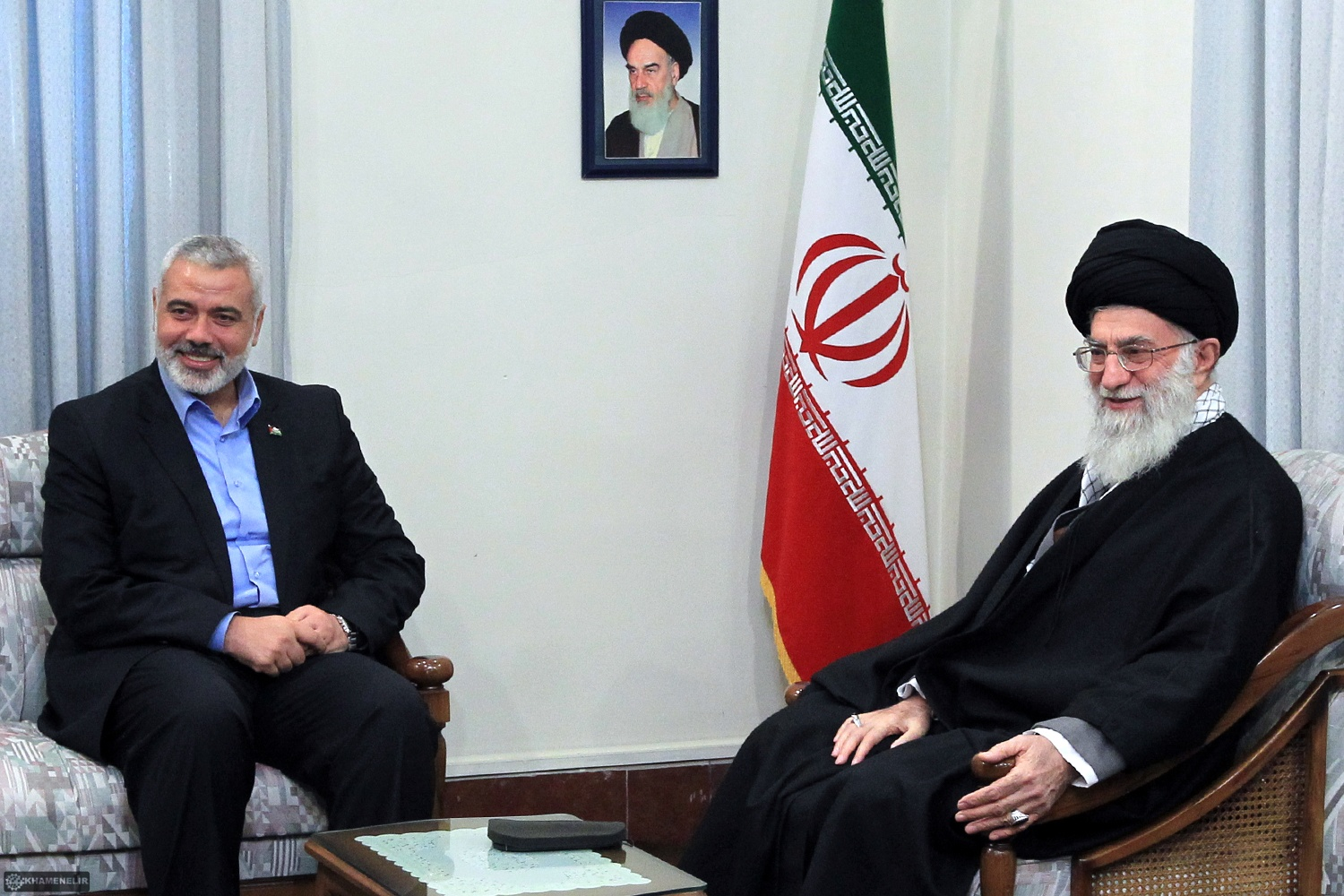
Hamas leader Ismail Haniyeh and Iranian Supreme Leader Ali Khamenei in 2012

After winning the Palestinian elections, Hamas leaders made diplomatic tours abroad. In April 2006, Mahmoud al-Zahar (then foreign minister) visited Saudi Arabia, Syria, Kuwait, Bahrein, Qatar, the UAE, Yemen, Libya, Algeria, Sudan and Egypt. In Syria he held talks on the issue of Palestinians stuck on the Syrian-Iraqi border. He stated he met officials from Western Europe in Qatar who did not wish to be named. In May he visited Indonesia, Malaysia, the Sultanate of Brunei, Pakistan, China, Sri Lanka, Iran, and participated in the China–Arab States Cooperation Forum. Ismail Haniyeh visited Egypt, Syria, Kuwait, Iran, Lebanon, Qatar and Saudi Arabia.

Hamas has always maintained leadership abroad. The movement is deliberately fragmented to ensure Israel cannot kill its leaders. Hamas used to be strongly allied with Iran and Syria. Iran gave Hamas an estimated $13–15 million in 2011 as well as access to long-range missiles. Hamas's political bureau was once located in the Syrian capital Damascus before the Syrian civil war. Relations between Hamas, Iran, and Syria began to turn cold when Hamas refused to back Syrian President Bashar al-Assad; Hamas backed the Sunni rebels fighting against Assad. As a result, Iran cut funding to Hamas, and Iranian ally Hezbollah ordered Hamas members out of Lebanon. Hamas was then forced out of Syria, and has tried to mend fences with Iran and Hezbollah. Hamas contacted Jordan and Sudan to see if either would open up its borders to its political bureau, but both refused, although they welcomed Hamas members leaving Syria.

From 2012 to 2013, under the leadership of Muslim Brotherhood President Mohamed Morsi, Hamas had the support of Egypt. After Morsi was removed, his successor Abdul Fattah al-Sisi outlawed the Muslim Brotherhood and destroyed the tunnels Hamas built into Egypt. In 2015, Egypt declared Hamas a terrorist organization, but overturned this in June the same year. There was a rapprochement between Hamas and Egypt, when a Hamas delegation visited Cairo in 2016. Hamas has assisted Egypt in controlling the insurgency in Sinai. Hamas denied Egypt's request to deploy its own militants in the Sinai leading to tensions between the two. Egypt has occasionally served as mediator between Hamas and Fatah, seeking to unify the two. In 2017, Yahya Sinwar visited Cairo and convinced Egypt to open the Rafah crossing, letting in cement and fuel in exchange for Hamas committing to better relations with Fatah; this led to the signing of the 2017 Fatah–Hamas Agreement.

The United Arab Emirates has been hostile to Hamas, viewing it as the Palestinian equivalent of the Muslim Brotherhood, a designated terrorist organization in the UAE.

Hamas enjoyed close relations with Saudi Arabia in its early years. Saudi Arabia funded most of its operations from 2000 to 2004, but reduced its support due to US pressure. In 2020, many Hamas members in Saudi Arabia were arrested. In 2022, Saudi Arabia began releasing Hamas members from prison. In 2023, Ismail Haniyeh visited Riyadh, a sign of improving relations. Haniyeh had long sought to visit, and his requests had been ignored until then.

Despite its Sunni Islamist ideology, Hamas has been flexible and pragmatic in its foreign policy, moderating and toning down its religious rhetoric when expedient; it has developed strong ties with Iran, and established relations with constitutionally secular states such as Syria and Russia. Kyrylo Budanov, the chief of Ukraine's Main Directorate of Intelligence, has accused Russia of supporting Hamas by supplying it with stolen Ukrainian weaponry, and the National Resistance Center of Ukraine alleged that the Russian Wagner Group trained Hamas militants ahead of the 7 October attacks.

North Korean arms were likely used during the 7 Oct assault on Israel. Ali Barakeh, a Hamas official living in Lebanon, claimed the two are allies.

Hamas leaders reportedly re-established relations with Kuwait, Libya and Oman, all of which reportedly have not had warm relations with Fatah. The cool relationship between Fatah and Kuwait owed to Arafat's support for Saddam Hussein during the Gulf War. This rapprochement was in part due to Hamas' policy of non-interference in the internal affairs of Arab countries. Mahmoud al-Zahar stated that Hamas does not "play the game" of siding with one Arab nation against another. When Yusuf al-Qaradawi, and other Sunni ulema, called for an uprising against Assad's regime in Syria, Mahmoud al-Zahar maintained that taking sides would harm the Palestinian cause.

After the fall of the Assad regime in Syria, Hamas congratulated the Syrian people for achieving their "aspirations for freedom and justice," and expressed hope that the new Syrian government would continue "its historical and pivotal role in supporting the Palestinian people." In 2025, Hamas condemned Israeli attacks on Syria.

=== Terrorist designation ===
Designated Hamas as a terrorist organization Designated the military wing of Hamas as a terrorist organization

The United States designated Hamas as a terrorist organisation in 1995, as did Canada in November 2002, and the United Kingdom in November 2021. In May 2021, the Organization of American States designated Hamas as a terrorist organisation. The European Union so designated Hamas's military wing in 2001 and, under US pressure, designated Hamas in 2003. Hamas challenged this decision, which was upheld by the European Court of Justice in July 2017. Japan and New Zealand have designated the military wing of Hamas as a terrorist organisation. The organisation is banned in Jordan. Citing previous infiltration attempts in 2018 and 2022, the Philippines declared Hamas as a terrorist organization in 2023. In late February 2024, New Zealand re-designated the entire Hamas organisation as a terror entity. In December 2024, Switzerland approved a bill to ban the group for five years. In April 2025, Paraguay expanded its designation of Hamas as a terrorist organisation to include its political wing. In September 2025, Ecuador designated Hamas as a terrorist organisation, as did Costa Rica on 8 April 2026, and Honduras and Trinidad and Tobago on 15 April.

In April 2025, Hamas filed a legal case in Britain appealing its designation as a terrorist group. The filing argues that Hamas has never engaged in an armed operation outside of historic Palestine and is not a threat to Western nations. Hamas politician Mousa Abu Marzook submitted a written statement arguing, "Hamas is not a terrorist group. It is a Palestinian Islamic liberation and resistance movement whose goal is to liberate Palestine and confront the Zionist project."

Hamas is not regarded as a terrorist organisation by Afghanistan, Algeria, Iran, Russia, Norway, (Note: "In 2006, Norway explicitly distanced itself from the EU proscription regime, claiming that it was causing problems for its role as a 'neutral facilitator.'") Turkey, China, Egypt, Syria, and Brazil. Many other states, including Russia, China, Syria, Turkey and Iran, have regarded Hamas's (armed) struggle as legitimate.

Tobias Buck, a Financial Times writer, wrote in 2012 that Hamas is "listed as a terrorist organisation by Israel, the US and the EU, but few dare to treat it that way", and that in the Arab and Muslim world it had lost its pariah status, as its emissaries are welcomed by Islamic governments. In the early 2010s, Hamas was considered a terrorist group by some governments and academics, while others regarded Hamas as a complex organisation with terrorism as only one component.

=== Israeli policy towards Hamas ===
Historical accounts note that Israel's encouragement of Islamist movements in Palestine long predated Hamas's takeover of Gaza, with Israeli authorities adopting a "divide-and-rule" strategy by supporting conservative and religious groups like the Palestinian Village Leagues and Sheikh Ahmed Yassin's al-Mujama al-Islami to counter the secular PLO. This strategy is documented in statements by several former Israeli figures, including Brigadier General Yitzhak Segev, who admitted to funding al-Mujama al-Islami at the request of Israeli authorities; former Civil Administration director Efraim Sneh; and former head of the Southern Command Yitzhak Mordechai, and Israeli professor Avner Cohen.

Benjamin Netanyahu had been Israel's prime minister for most of the two decades preceding the Gaza war, and was criticized for having championed a policy of empowering Hamas in Gaza. This policy was part of a strategy to sabotage a two-state solution by confining the Palestinian Authority to the West Bank and weakening it, and to demonstrate to the Israeli public and western governments that Israel has no partner for peace. This criticism was leveled by several Israeli officials, including former prime minister Ehud Barak, and former head of Shin Bet security services Yuval Diskin. Saudi Arabia and the Palestinian Authority were also critical of Israel under Netanyahu allowing suitcases of Qatari money to be given to Hamas, in exchange for maintaining the ceasefire. An op-ed by Tal Schneider for the Times of Israel reported after the Hamas attack that Netanyahu's policy to treat the Palestinian Authority as a burden and Hamas as an asset had "blown up in our faces".

=== Qatar and Turkey ===
According to Middle East experts, now Hamas has two firm allies: Qatar and Turkey. Both give Hamas public and financial assistance estimated to be in the hundreds of millions of dollars. Qatar has transferred more than $1.8 billion to Hamas. Shashank Joshi, senior research fellow at the Royal United Services Institute, says that "Qatar also hosts Hamas's political bureau which includes Hamas leader Khaled Meshaal." Meshaal also visits Turkey frequently to meet with Turkish Prime Minister Recep Tayyip Erdoğan. Erdogan has dedicated himself to breaking Hamas out of its political and economic seclusion. On US television, Erdogan said in 2012 that "I don't see Hamas as a terror organization. Hamas is a political party."

Qatar has been called Hamas' most important financial backer and foreign ally. In 2007, Qatar was, with Turkey, the only country to back Hamas after the group ousted the Palestinian Authority from the Gaza Strip. The relationship between Hamas and Qatar strengthened in 2008 and 2009 when Khaled Meshaal was invited to attend the Doha Summit where he was seated next to the then Qatari Emir Hamad bin Khalifa al-Thani, who pledged $250 million to repair the damage caused by Israel in the Israeli war on Gaza. These events caused Qatar to become the main player in the "Palestinian issue". Qatar called Gaza's blockade unjust and immoral, which prompted the Hamas government in Gaza, including former Prime Minister Ismail Haniyeh, to thank Qatar for their "unconditional" support. Qatar then began regularly handing out political, material, humanitarian and charitable support for Hamas.

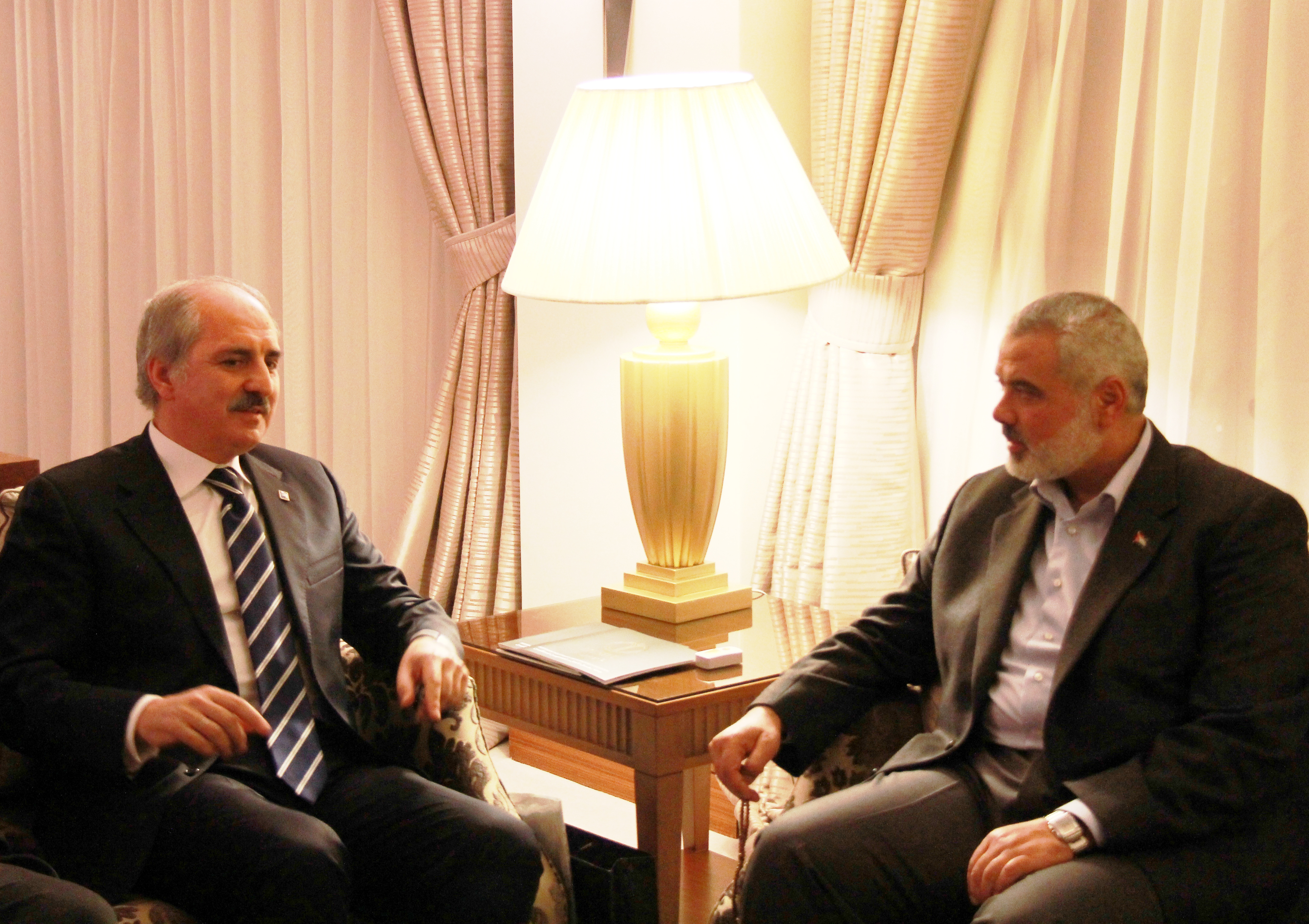
Haniyeh (right) with former Turkish Minister of Culture and current Speaker of the Grand National Assembly, Numan Kurtulmuş, 20 November 2012

In 2011, U.S. President Barack Obama personally requested that Qatar, one of the U.S.'s most important Arab allies, provide a base for the Hamas leadership. At the time, the U.S. were seeking to establish communications with Hamas and believed that a Hamas office in Qatar would be easier to access than a Hamas bureau in Iran, the group's main backer.

In 2012, Qatar's former Emir, Hamad bin Khalifa al-Thani, became the first head of state to visit Gaza under Hamas rule. He pledged to raise $400 million for reconstruction. Sources say that advocating for Hamas is politically beneficial to Turkey and Qatar because the Palestinian cause draws popular support amongst their citizens at home.

Speaking in reference to Qatar's support for Hamas, during a 2015 visit to Palestine, Qatari official Mohammad al-Emadi, said Qatar is using the money not to help Hamas but rather the Palestinian people as a whole. He acknowledges that giving to the Palestinian people means using Hamas as the local contact. Emadi said, "You have to support them. You don't like them, don't like them. But they control the country, you know." Some argue that Hamas's relations with Qatar are putting Hamas in an awkward position because Qatar has become part of the regional Arab problem. Hamas says that having contacts with various Arab countries establishes positive relations which will encourage Arab countries to do their duty toward the Palestinians and support their cause by influencing public opinion in the Arab world. In March 2015, Hamas has announced its support of the Saudi Arabian-led military intervention in Yemen against the Shia Houthis and forces loyal to former President Ali Abdullah Saleh. In a controversial deal, Israel's government under Benjamin Netanyahu supported Qatar's payments to Hamas for many years, in the hope that it would turn Hamas into an effective counterweight to the Palestinian Authority and prevent the establishment of a Palestinian state.

In May 2018, Turkish president Recep Tayyip Erdoğan tweeted to the Prime Minister of Israel Benjamin Netanyahu that Hamas is not a terrorist organization but a resistance movement that defends the Palestinian homeland against an occupying power. During that period there were conflicts between Israeli troops and Palestinian protestors in the Gaza Strip, due to the decision of the United States to move their embassy to Jerusalem. Also in 2018 the Israel Security Agency accused SADAT International Defense Consultancy (a Turkish private military company with connections to the Turkish government) of transferring funds to Hamas.

In February 2020, Hamas leader Ismail Haniyeh met with Turkish President Erdoğan. On 26 July 2023, Haniyeh met with Erdoğan and Palestinian Authority President Mahmoud Abbas. Behind the meeting was Turkey's effort to reconcile Fatah with Hamas. On 7 October 2023, the day of the attack on Israel, Haniyeh was in Istanbul, Turkey. On 21 October 2023, Haniyeh spoke with Erdoğan about the latest developments in the Gaza war and the current situation in Gaza. On 25 October 2023, Erdoğan said that Hamas was not a terrorist organisation but a liberation group fighting to protect Palestinian lands and people.

=== United States ===
In early 2025, the US' Special Envoy for Hostage Affairs, Adam Boehler, talked directly with Hamas in an attempt to secure the release of American hostages. Following these talks, Boehler said that Hamas had proposed a 5 to 10-year ceasefire and a full prisoner exchange, and told Kan News that he "does believe" that Hamas would not only lay down its weapons but also leave power in Gaza. He told Fox News that "Hamas is aiming for a long-term ceasefire. We discussed a cease-fire that includes Hamas disarming, staying out of politics, and ensuring they cannot harm Israel." Secretary of State Marco Rubio told reporters that the talks were a "one-off situation in which our special envoy for hostages, whose job it is to get people released, had an opportunity to talk directly to someone who has control over these people and was given permission and encouraged to do so. He did so." According to Ynet, since he was appointed, Boehler has made several "controversial" proposals, including everything from U.S. commando raids into Gaza "and hinting at the possibility of a long-term cease-fire ("hudna") between Hamas and Israel."

In January 2026, the United States designated three national branches of the Muslim Brotherhood as terrorist organisations, citing an executive order directing a review of Brotherhood chapters and alleging that the Egyptian and Jordanian branches had provided financial and operational support to Hamas and related violent activities. The designations resulted in sanctions and asset freezes, and were justified by U.S. officials as part of broader efforts to counter networks alleged to support Hamas and similar militant groups.

== See also ==
- Do you condemn Hamas? – Question in Israel–Palestine debates
- Hamastan – Term referring to Hamas administration of Gaza
- Jewish Resistance Movement – Alliance of armed groups (1945–1946)
- List of political parties in Palestine
- Palestinian war crimes
