= Assassination of Abdel Aziz al-Rantisi =

2004 murder in Gaza Strip

- Date: 17 April 2004; 22 years ago
- Location: Gaza City, Gaza Strip, Palestine
- Cause: Attacks against Israel
- Target: (Palestine) (Hamas) Abdel Aziz al-Rantisi
- Perpetrator: Israel Defense Forces
- Deaths: 3

On the evening of 17 April 2004, the leader of Hamas in the Gaza Strip, Abdel Aziz al-Rantisi, aged 56, was assassinated by missiles fired by Israeli warplanes on the car he was traveling in. In addition two of his bodyguards were killed. The operation was considered part of a campaign to eliminate the leaders of the groups fighting in the uprising. The assassination led to widespread condemnation around the world. Hamas spokesman Ismail Haniyeh vowed to avenge the death, saying the sacrifice would not be in vain.

== Background ==
Al-Rantisi was among the founders of the Islamic Resistance Movement (Hamas) in December 1987. He was arrested on March 4, 1988, and remained in prison until September 4, 1990. He was deported on December 17, 1992, along with 425 other Hamas and Islamic Jihad activists and cadres, to southern Lebanon. Then he was allowed to return and was imprisoned until 1997. He was also arrested by Palestinian Authority security forces and detained for 15 months.

Al-Rantisi had narrowly escaped an assassination attack on June 10, 2003, as an Apache aircraft identified his location and targeted his vehicle with a missile. The operation resulted in the deaths of three Palestinians, including a woman and a girl, and left Al-Rantisi injured with shrapnel in his lower left extremity. Al-Rantisi, still under the influence of anesthesia following the surgical procedure, committed to "persisting with the resistance efforts."

== Assassination ==
The attack took place less than a month after the assassination of leader Ahmed Yassin. Rantisi was one of the founders of the movement. On 10 June 2003, Al-Rantisi had survived an assassination attempt by an Apache helicopter, in which he and his son were wounded. He was still alive when he was taken to hospital where he died a few minutes later. In response, the militant movement promised retribution.

== Reactions ==
- EU: Javier Solana, the European Union's foreign policy chief, indicated that the assassination is "unlawful and does not contribute to easing tensions".
- Bahrain: Information Minister Nabil Al-Hamar stated that the killing of Al-Rantisi was considered as state terrorism and would have negative consequences on the peace process.
- Egypt: The Foreign Minister, Ahmed Maher, strongly denounced the recent actions of Israel, emphasizing that the policies of killing, assassination, and destruction will only serve to perpetuate the cycle of violence and will not result in the desired security or peace. The Egyptian Minister of Information, Safwat Al-Sharif, stated that "the Israeli practice of targeted killings signifies a significant escalation" and "a deviation from the rationality required for promoting peace, security, and stability in the Middle East". The Grand Imam, Sheikh of Al-Azhar, Muhammad Sayyid Tantawy, condemned the assassination of Al-Rantisi and considered it “the ugliest form of immorality and treachery".
- Iran: Iranian Foreign Ministry spokesman Hamid-Reza Assefi condemned the killing on April 18, stating that such measures undermine stability and will not solve the basic problems facing Israel. The head of the Expediency Discernment Council, Ali Akbar Hashemi Rafsanjani, said that the attack is an example of "Israeli terrorism under the protection of the U.S."
- Israel: Israel's representative to the United Nations, Dan Gillerman, said that he regrets that the Council is meeting again, not to condemn the killing of innocent civilians by organizations such as Hamas, but rather to denounce the killing of one of the architects of those massacres. He said if the Palestinian Authority were a real partner in the peace process, Israel would not need defensive measures. During a cabinet meeting, the Israeli Prime Minister praised the ministers and Israeli citizens for the successful operation that killed Al-Rantisi. He also commended the security services and forces for their role in the operation.
- Italy: Italy expressed its rejection, along with the "entire European Union", of the policy of targeted killing.
- Palestinian Authority: The Palestinian Authority denounced the assassination of Abdel Aziz Al-Rarantisi and warned the Israeli government against continuing the policy of assassinations.
- Yemen: The government demanded that Ariel Sharon be brought to trial as a war criminal, cautioning that Israel's abuse of unwavering American backing would result in more decline and disorder.
- United Kingdom: British Foreign Secretary Jack Straw said that such assassinations were "wrong and did not help bring about peace". The UK government has made it clear that so-called targeted assassinations of this kind are "unlawful, unjustified and counterproductive".
- United States: The United States refused to condemn the killing of Rantissi, as White House spokesman Scott McClellan stressed “Israel’s right to defend itself from terrorist attacks,” expressing at the same time Washington’s deep concern about peace and stability in the region.

== Aftermath ==
His funeral took place the next day, and large, angry crowds participated in his funeral. Fighters from Palestinian national and Islamic organizations also participated in the cortège. At the same time, Hamas named a new leader, whom it did not disclose due to security reasons.

On 20 April 2004, Israel Defense Forces shot dead four Palestinians. The same day, Sharon warned of further attacks on Hamas leaders. He said that the two leaders would not be the last to be killed.

His wife Jamila al-Shanti was also killed after the start of the Gaza war.

== Analysis ==
Khaled Hroub maintains that the murders of Rantisi and Yassin resulted in a paradox for the movement, with a surge in Hamas's popularity juxtaposed with a significant weakening of the organization.

== See also ==
- Killing of Ahmed Yassin
- Assassination of Saleh al-Arouri
- Assassination of Ismail Haniyeh
