= Ali al-Amoudi =

De facto leader of Hamas in Gaza (born 1975)

Acting Chairman of the Political Bureau in the Gaza Strip
- Incumbent
- De facto c. 20 July 2026
- Preceded by: Khalil al-Hayya (acting)
- Interim c. December 2025 or c. 11 January 2026 – c. 23 February 2026
- Preceded by: Khalil al-Hayya (acting)
- Succeeded by: Khalil al-Hayya (acting)

Head of the Media Department of Hamas
- In office 2021–2023
- Preceded by: Issam al-Da'alis

Personal details
- Born: 24 February 1975 (age 51) Khan Yunis, Israeli-occupied Gaza Strip

Ali al‑Amoudi (Arabic: علي العامودي; born 24 February 1975) is a Palestinian politician who has served as the Chairman of the Political Bureau in the Gaza Strip since October 2026. He previously headed Hamas' Media Department and appeared as a spokesperson for the group, where he was involved in communicating Hamas' political messaging and public statements.

In 2026, he was reported as the frontrunner to succeed Khalil al-Hayya as head of Hamas' political bureau in the Gaza Strip.

== Biography ==
Al-Amoudi was born in Khan Yunis on 24 February 1975.

He joined Hamas in his youth, and participated in its activities in the 1990s. According to the Israel Defense Forces (IDF), these activities included the killing of four Israelis in the West Bank in 1993 and the killing of Shin Bet agent Noam-Menachem Cohen in Ramallah a year later. He was arrested by Israeli forces over his affiliation with the group in 2004, and sentenced to life in prison. While imprisoned, he formed close relations with Yahya Sinwar, who would later lead Hamas. The two were among 1,027 Palestinian prisoners released as part of the Gilad Shalit prisoner exchange in October 2011.

Between 2015 and 2017, al-Amoudi oversaw the Military Information Department of Hamas's armed wing, the Qassam Brigades. After Sinwar became head of the Hamas political bureau in 2017, al-Amoudi was put in charge of Sinwar's office, a role he served until 2021, when he was elected into the political bureau and succeeded Issam al-Da'alis as president of Hamas's media department. While he held this role, he helped forge the group's media relations and released statements for the group.

He regularly represented Hamas in press statements and major public rallies, emphasizing resistance narratives and the ideological framing of conflicts, including calls for defense and liberation of the Al‑Aqsa Mosque. In 2021, he expressed military actions such as the Qassam Brigades "Sword's Edge" battle as turning points in conflict, he described such campaign as a major transformation in the battle against the enemy. In 2023, he denounced Israeli actions against Palestinian journalists as deliberate attempts to suppress evidence and terrorize media professionals.

His responsibilities were expanded when the Gaza war broke out after the 7 October attacks in 2023. The IDF accused him of involvement in decision-making for the attacks. He further rose to prominence after the killing of Sinwar in October 2024 and his deputy, Rawhi Mushtaha, earlier that year. After Sinwar was killed, he became head of Hamas's emergency command, before being appointed deputy to Khalil al-Hayya. He helped reorganize Hamas's leadership, replacing many local leaders, including those injured by Israeli attacks. After al-Hayya was appointed head of the political bureau in July 2026, al-Amoudi became the acting president in Gaza. He is running for president in the political bureau's internal elections in Gaza against Nizar Awadallah, who is backed by Khaled Mashal and Zaher Jabarin, while al-Amoudi is supported by al-Hayya.

== Assassination attempt ==
On 3 October 2026, Israel struck a building in western Gaza City, reportedly targeting al-Amoudi. Five people including four women were reported killed, and al-Amoudi's fate was unclear. Those killed include two members of Gaza's Greek Orthodox church. The IDF later confirmed that it targeted al-Amoudi. On 5 October, Hamas official Ghazi Hamad stated that al-Amoudi had survived the assassination attempt. On 17 October, a senior Hamas official confirmed to Asharq Al-Awsat that al-Amoudi had sustained moderate injuries, including fractures to his limbs, in the strike.

== See also ==
- Hamas most wanted playing cards
