= Israeli attack on Doha =

2025 strikes in Doha, Qatar

- Part of the Gaza war the Middle Eastern crisis (2023–present) and the Arab–Israeli conflict
- CCTV footage of the strike Location in Qatar
- Type: Targeted killing, airstrike, decapitation
- Location: Leqtaifiya, Doha, Qatar; 25°21′26″N 51°30′35″E
- Target: Hamas leadership
- Date: 9 September 2025; 3:46 p.m. (UTC+3)
- Executed by: Israel Defense Forces; Israeli Air Force; Shin Bet
- Outcome: Israeli failure: Entire Hamas leadership survived
- Casualties: 6 killed, including one Qatari security official; at least 4 injured

On 9 September 2025, during the Gaza war, the Israel Defense Forces (IDF) conducted an airstrike in the Leqtaifiya district of Qatar's capital Doha, targeting the leadership of Hamas, housed in a Qatari government residential complex, as it met to discuss an active ceasefire proposal presented by the United States. The attack killed and injured Hamas members, Qatari security forces, and multiple civilians. The attack was Israel's first known attack in Qatar, and its first direct strike on a Gulf Cooperation Council member.

According to reports, the intended targets included four senior Hamas figures: Khalil al-Hayya, Zaher Jabarin, Muhammad Ismail Darwish and Khaled Mashal. Those targeted were involved in negotiations for a ceasefire to the Gaza war and an Israeli–Palestinian prisoner–hostage exchange. The Israeli security establishment assessed that the strike aimed at assassinating Hamas leaders failed.

The attack was celebrated by politicians inside Israel, whose government said it was in response to the Ramot Junction shooting the day before. The attack was described by Qatar as an act of state terrorism. It was widely condemned internationally, including by the United Nations Security Council with U.S. backing.

== Background ==
=== Israel–Qatar relations and support for Hamas ===
Qatar had been hosting Hamas's political leadership since 2012, when senior figures, including Khaled Mashal—then chairman of the Hamas Political Bureau—relocated from Syria during the Syrian civil war. According to Qatari officials, the move followed a request from the United States to facilitate indirect communication with the group. Qatar also said that Israel itself requested Qatar to host Hamas leaders for the purposes of negotiations. Other senior members based in Doha have included Ismail Haniyeh, Khalil al-Hayya, and Mousa Abu Marzouk. Similarly, Qatar also previously hosted the Taliban in Doha, again at the request of the United States.

Concurrently with the above, Qatar had been an important financial backer of the Hamas government in the Gaza Strip, having transferred more than $1.8 billion to it over the years. Beginning in 2018, Qatar transferred monthly payments of roughly US $30 million to the Gaza Strip in coordination with Israel and the United States. According to Israeli and Qatari officials, these funds were intended for humanitarian purposes, which includes fuel purchases, civil-service salaries, and assistance to low-income families, and were monitored under arrangements approved by the Israeli government. Defence analysts said that the transfers were made to calm tensions between Israel and Gaza. According to Prime Minister Benjamin Netanyahu, the reason for allowing the aid was humanitarian.

=== U.S. attempt to create Gulf–Israel security alignment ===
The United States promoted Gulf–Israel security alignment oriented against Iran, involving a regional air defence system that includes Israel. The United Arab Emirates and Bahrain normalized relations with Israel in 2020, and Saudi Arabia was close to formally doing the same before October 7. After the 2020 Abraham Accords, regional geopolitical planning centered on connecting Israel and the Gulf Cooperation Council countries (Qatar among them) within a wider India–Middle East–Europe Economic Corridor. The concept, developed alongside initiatives such as I2U2, the Negev Summit, and the Atlantic Council's N7 Initiative, had aimed to establish transport and trade links from India through Gulf states and Israel to Europe. The corridor's viability depended on sustained political cooperation between Gulf capitals and Israel. But after October 7 and Israel's ensuing response, Israel's conduct of the Gaza war made Israel unpopular with Arab populations. Additionally, Gulf rulers feared entanglement in Israel's conflict with Iran and allied groups, as with Qatar, which suffered the 2025 Iranian strikes on Al Udeid Air Base, in the wake of the US airstrikes on Iran's nuclear sites during the June 2025 Twelve-Day War. Israel's full US-brokered security alignment with the GCC—and therefore with Qatar—did not occur. Consequently, Qatar had no formal security guarantees or defensive pacts that might have served as a material deterrent, because the existing GCC-only coordinated defense instrument, the Peninsula Shield Force, was mostly notional, while any U.S. security guarantee had only been "implicit in deals done and memoranda signed".

=== Israel's targeted killing of Hamas leaders ===
The Israeli government has publicly acknowledged its a policy of targeted killings of members of Palestinian militant organizations since at least 2001. Khalil al-Hayya, a reported target of this air strike, was previously targeted by a 2007 assassination attempt, which killed at least seven of his family members. His home in Gaza was struck by an airstrike in the 2014 Gaza War.

Following the October 7 attacks in 2023 which started the Gaza war, Israel vowed to kill all Hamas leaders. Israel has, however, participated in mediated negotiations with Hamas, through Qatar, which has since the start of the war hosted negotiations in Doha, maintaining contacts with both sides; senior Israeli officials have travelled to the emirate repeatedly to discuss the release of hostages held in Gaza.

Following the 2024 assassination of Mohammed Deif (13 July) and Ismail Haniyeh (31 July), and the killing of Yahya Sinwar (16 October), al-Hayya—a founding member of Hamas and its chief negotiator—became one of five members of the newly formed "temporary committee", a provisional top decision-making body whose other members are Mashal, Zaher Jabarin, Muhammad Ismail Darwish, and a fifth unknown member.

On 31 August 2025, IDF chief of staff Eyal Zamir stated that Israel was seeking to kill Hamas officials across the Middle East, telling reserve soldiers that "Hamas will have no place to hide from us" and that all figures, senior or junior, would be struck wherever found.

=== Qatar-mediated negotiations during the Gaza war ===
During the Gaza war, Qatar hosted Hamas diplomats and was successful in brokering a ceasefire twice—the first time in 2023. In November 2024, Hamas members left Qatar for Turkey, after the United States asked Qatar to expel the Hamas members in response to a breakdown in negotiations over the ceasefire. (Note: In May 2024, it was reported that the United States had urged Qatar to expel Hamas leaders from its territory if they refused to agree to a hostage deal with Israel. Subsequently, Qatar was reported to be reviewing the future of Hamas's office in Doha as part of a broader evaluation of its role as a mediator in the Gaza war.) Another ceasefire took place in early 2025, brokered by Egypt, Qatar, and the United States; it ended with the March 2025 Israeli attacks on the Gaza Strip.

The negotiations then stalled during the summer, with Israel rejecting a ceasefire plan by Egypt and Qatar (accepted by Hamas), that would have entailed a release of half of the Hamas-held hostages; namely, Israel demanded the release of all remaining hostages, numbering 20, and the return of all bodies that Israel treats as hostages. Concurrently with this rejection of the ceasefire plan, Israel began a full ground invasion of Gaza City. According to an analysis by The Washington Post, as the decision to launch the invasion was nearing, Netanyahu may have decided to forgo further negotiations, seeing them as limiting his freedom to pursue the military path. Netanyahu was publicly stating that this course of action was "the best way to end the war and the best way to end it speedily".

On 7 September, Hamas announced it was ready to "immediately sit at the negotiating table" after receiving, via mediators, what it described as "some ideas from the American side aimed at reaching a ceasefire agreement". According to a Palestinian official, the United States plan envisaged freeing the remaining 48 hostages in the first 48 hours of a 60‑day truce in exchange for Palestinian prisoners in Israeli jails and negotiations on a permanent ceasefire. On 8 September, Hamas representatives met Qatari prime minister Mohammed bin Abdulrahman bin Jassim Al Thani to discuss the U.S. proposal, with plans to reconvene the following day (the day of the attack).

== Prelude ==
With the negotiations stalled, Mossad prepared a plan for a covert ground operation to assassinate the Hamas leaders, but the agency's director David Barnea ultimately opposed its execution, worrying that it would damage Mossad's cooperation with Qatar—whose function as a mediator Barnea and Mossad saw as valuable. Barnea's stance reflected dissent in the Israeli security establishment over Netanyahu's timing considering that the location would be in a U.S. ally's territory, and that Hamas leaders were considering the new, U.S.-brokered hostages-for-ceasefire proposal; looking at the success of the covert assassination of Ismail Haniyeh the year prior (using planted explosives), some in the establishment argued Mossad could eliminate leaders covertly at a time and place of Israel's choosing. However, a decision was made to kill Hamas leaders in an airstrike instead.

The operation was reportedly codenamed Atzeret HaEsh (Hebrew: עצרת האש, lit. 'Summit of Fire'). Israel stated the attack was a response to the October 7 attacks and the Ramot Junction shooting the previous day.

Two days prior, U.S. president Donald Trump issued what he described as his "last warning" to Hamas, urging the group to agree to a hostage release deal, stating "the Israelis have accepted my terms. It is time for Hamas to accept as well [...] I have warned Hamas about the consequences of not accepting. This is my last warning, there will not be another one!"

After the attack a senior Israeli official told Channel 12 that Trump had approved it.

Agence France-Presse reported that an anonymous White House official stated "we were informed in advance" regarding the strike on Qatar, a U.S. ally and host to a major U.S. military base. The Qatari foreign ministry, however, stated that Qatar had not been informed in advance, noting that "the communication received from one of the U.S. officials came during the sound of explosions."

== Attack ==
On 9 September 2025, at 3:46 p.m. AST, ten missiles fired from IDF fighter jets struck a residential compound next to the Woqod petrol station on Wadi Rawdan Street in the Leqtaifiya district of Doha, targeting the senior political leadership of Hamas. Citing US officials, The Wall Street Journal reported that the operation involved eight Israeli F-15 fighter jets and four F-35s, which fired air-launched ballistic missiles (Note: It is uncertain which (as of September 12, 2025). According to The Wall Street Journal : "Israel's arsenal of air-launched ballistic missiles was disclosed in U.S. intelligence documents leaked in 2024. The reports referred to two different missiles—the "Golden Horizon" and the ISO2, or Rocks, system ...") into space from over the Red Sea, avoiding Arab airspaces. The missiles flew above Saudi Arabia before striking Doha. The attack marked the first direct strike by Israel on one of the member states of the Gulf Cooperation Council. The gated compound, which was a state-designated residential complex housing Hamas negotiators and their families—and was used by the Hamas Political Bureau as its headquarters—was significantly damaged, but not demolished.

Qatari radar systems did not detect Israeli airplanes or missiles. The Israeli forces did not encounter any resistance from American defenses stationed inside Qatar. Qatar operates U.S.-supplied Patriot air defense systems, as do the U.S. forces in Qatar. It is not designed to intercept ballistic missiles at their apogee in space and would have, therefore, been unable to protect Qatar. Another system, THAAD, reportedly would have been, but it is not fielded in Qatar.

According to the BBC, the targeted Hamas leaders were likely convening to formulate their response to the American hostage deal proposal; According to Hamas as well as Israeli media reports, Hamas officials present at the meeting included al-Hayya, Mashal, Darwish, Marzook, and Jabarin. Asharq Al-Awsat, citing Hamas sources, reported that al-Hayya's office was struck four times, while the meeting was taking place in the former office of Ismail Haniyeh. One missile that did hit Haniyeh's office landed on the opposite corner from where the targets were seated, injuring two unnamed officials, one seriously. Separately from these reported injuries among the targeted individuals, Hamas stated that six people were killed, none of whom were the targets. The fatalities were identified as al-Hayya's son Humam, his office director Jihad Abu Labal, three bodyguards, and a corporal in the Qatari Internal Security Force. Additional Qatari security officers were injured. Multiple civilians were also injured, including the wives of the elder and junior al-Hayya and other family members.

== Aftermath ==
A funeral for the victims was held at the Imam Muhammad ibn Abd al-Wahhab Mosque in Doha on 11 September. Among the attendants were Qatari Emir Sheikh Tamim bin Hamad Al Thani and senior Hamas officials Osama Hamdan and Izzat al-Rishq.

The Israeli security establishment has increasingly assessed that the strike aimed at assassinating Hamas leaders failed.

=== Initial statements by Israel, Qatar, Hamas and the United States ===
The attack was widely praised and "celebrated" by politicians across the political spectrum inside Israel. The office of Israeli Prime Minister Benjamin Netanyahu stated: "Today's action against the top terrorist chieftains of Hamas was a wholly independent Israeli operation [...] Israel initiated it, Israel conducted it, and Israel takes full responsibility." Netanyahu also warned Qatar for providing Hamas leaders with a "safe haven," stating "I say to Qatar and all nations who harbor terrorists: you either expel them or you bring them to justice. Because if you don't, we will." Yechiel Leiter, Israel's ambassador to the United States, stated that "If we didn't get them this time, we'll get them the next time," indicating that surviving Hamas members would be targeted again. Following the strike, during an event at the U.S. embassy in Jerusalem, Netanyahu talked about ending the war, stating that Israel had already accepted the conditions of a truce proposal put forward by Trump and that if Hamas were to accept it as well, the war would end immediately. However, The Hostages and Missing Families Forum, a group representing the families of the hostages, expressed "deep concern and grave apprehension" regarding the airstrikes as it would endanger the hostages further, and called for the Israeli government to come up with a "structured plan" for the return of the 48 hostages. Yinon Magal celebrated the attack live on Channel 14 with champagne and sweets.

Qatar described the attack as a "cowardly" violation of international law and sovereignty. Qatari Prime Minister Mohammed bin Abdulrahman al-Thani described the attack as "state terrorism" and called for Netanyahu to be "brought to justice". Foreign Ministry spokesman Majed al-Ansari stated: "Obviously, when one party asks us to deliver a proposal to the other side, and then when we start meeting with the other side for these proposals, they bomb our country—they bomb the mediator and the places where the talks were taking place—it sends a very clear message that there is nothing valid in the talks." The country appealed to the United Nations Security Council.

Hamas called the attack a failed assassination attempt and stated that the strike "confirms beyond doubt that Netanyahu and his government do not want to reach any agreement" for peace. It also stated that "we hold the U.S. administration jointly responsible with the occupation for this crime, due to its ongoing support for the aggression and crimes of the occupation against our people."

Although supportive of the Netanyahu government's conduct of the Gaza war, Trump condemned Netanyahu and said he was "very unhappy about every aspect" of the attack and was notified "unfortunately, too late to stop" it, adding that "unilaterally bombing inside Qatar, a sovereign nation and close ally of the United States, that is working very hard and bravely taking risks with us to broker peace, does not advance Israel or America's goals". He also commented that eliminating Hamas "is a worthy goal." White House Press Secretary Karoline Leavitt said that Trump "views Qatar as a strong ally and friend of the United States, and feels very badly about the location of the attack" and that Trump assured Qatar that "such a thing will not happen again on their soil". The United States notified the Qatari government of the attack via its envoy Steve Witkoff, but Qatar's Foreign Ministry stated that this warning came 10 minutes after the attack.

In the United States, Democrats and Republicans were divided over the attack. Democratic senators Jack Reed and Betty McCollum condemned the attack, although Democratic senator John Fetterman, a strong supporter of Israel, expressed happiness over the attack. Some Republicans such as senators Jim Risch and Roger Wicker also praised the attack, though others such as Michael McCaul expressed concerns that the strike could strain U.S. ties with Qatar.

=== International reactions ===
The attack was met with global condemnation. The United Nations Security Council condemned the attack in a statement drafted by France and the United Kingdom and agreed to by all 15 members, including the United States. Governments around the world condemned what they described as a breach of sovereignty and international law, warned of escalation, urged restraint and renewed diplomacy, and expressed solidarity with Qatar—including contemporary major and regional powers, such as Canada, whose prime minister, Mark Carney, condemned the "intolerable expansion of violence"; France, whose president, Emmanuel Macron, called the attack "unacceptable, whatever the reason"; Turkey, whose foreign ministry described the attack as "evidence of Israel's expansionist policies and its adoption of terrorism of state strategy"; Germany; Russia; and the United Kingdom; alongside others. Countries that accused Israel of committing an act of aggression included Algeria, Indonesia, Jordan, Kuwait, Lebanon, Libya, Malaysia, Mauritania, Morocco, Saudi Arabia, and Syria. Kurdistan Region, a semi-autonomous area in Iraq, announced its "full support for Qatar". Ukraine condemned the attack as a gross violation of international law. Among non-state actors, the attack was condemned by Hezbollah and the Houthis.

The United Nations Secretary-General António Guterres condemned the attack as a "flagrant violation of the sovereignty and territorial integrity of Qatar," and praised Qatar as "a country that has been playing a very positive role to achieve a ceasefire and release of all hostages." The Arab League stated that Israel's "behavior has now gone beyond all established international norms and every principle of international law, placing a clear responsibility on the international community to deal with a state that mocks the law and disregards the consequences of its shameful actions", and the Gulf Cooperation Council called the attack "despicable and cowardly". The chairperson of the African Union Commission, Mahamoud Ali Youssouf, said that the attack "risks endangering an already fragile situation in the Middle East". The European Union stated that the attack "breaches international law and Qatar's territorial integrity, and risks a further escalation of violence in the region."

=== Opinion polling ===
Israeli newspaper Maariv released a poll conducted by Lazar Studies found that 75% of Israelis approved Israel's attack on Qatar while only 11% of them opposed the operation. The poll also showed that 38% of them believed that the attack harmed the chances of securing a hostage deal, while 37% thought it would be helpful.

=== Political effects ===
According to Reuters, the strike was expected to result in the temporary or permanent end of ceasefire negotiations in the war. Frank Lowenstein, the former U.S. special envoy for the Middle East, stated that the strike signified the Israeli government had not only lost interest in negotiating a ceasefire but was sufficiently confident that the negotiations would become irrelevant to proceed with assassinating the Hamas negotiating team. If President Trump had known of and authorized the strike, it would signal his administration's approval of ending the negotiation track.

Various foreign relations and security analysts interviewed by Al Jazeera soon after the attack said that the attack causes harm to Qatar, which nurtures an image of a safe venue for tourism and international events, but that any possible adjustments to its security posture would depend on the U.S. response; however, Qatar might diversify security partnerships over time. They said that Qatar is expected to continue its mediator role, as the expulsion of Hamas would be seen as a sign of weakness.

According to Jon Gambrell of the Associated Press, the attack is a "violation of ... understandings" underpinning Arab–Israeli normalization. Qatar scheduled an extraordinary summit of Arab League and Organization of the Islamic Conference states for 15 September in order to formulate a multinational response to Israel. The summit exhibited a unified front in support of Qatar and censure of the attack. The dominant through‑lines were the need for enforceable measures to halt further violations of international law and references to the Gaza humanitarian crisis. No immediate political or economic measures were announced at the summit's conclusion. The final communique condemned "Israel's repeated threats of the possibility of targeting Qatar again", reiterating the countries' and organizations' condemnation of the attack and solidarity with Qatar. Separately from this, Qatar's foreign ministry spokesperson Majed al-Ansari said that the GCC's consultations aimed at strengthening collective deterrence were ongoing, with a session of the GCC Unified Military Command scheduled to convene in Doha.

Two days after the summit, Pakistan and Saudi Arabia upgraded their existing security partnership into a formal defense pact—the Strategic Mutual Defence Agreement. Under it, Saudi Arabia would come under Pakistan's nuclear umbrella. The agreement followed years of negotiations according to a Saudi official. Journalists and analysts reporting on the signing remarked that it occurred against a backdrop of diminished confidence in U.S. security guarantees, with the timing possibly being a signal to Israel.

On 29 September 2025, at a White House meeting, Trump and Netanyahu announced a new plan to end the war and establish postwar governance in Gaza. Prior to the announcement, Trump and Netanyahu placed a call to Qatari prime minister Mohammed bin Abdulrahman Al Thani, and at Trump's request, Netanyahu apologized to Al Thani for violating Qatar's sovereignty. Netanyahu conveyed regret to Al Thani for the killing of the Qatari serviceman, acknowledged that it violated Qatari sovereignty, and pledged that Israel would not repeat such an attack in the future. Several days prior to that, Qatar demanded Israel's apology in order to continue mediating. U.S. officials interviewed by ABC News stated that "the Trump administration viewed the conversation as necessary not only for smoothing over tensions with Qatar, a key mediator in longstanding efforts to end the war in Gaza, but also as a way to enhance support among Arab partners for the White House's proposal".

== See also ==
- Israeli assassination attempt on Khaled Meshal—failed Israeli assassination of Hamas leader Khaled Meshal in Jordan, in 1997, which led to a similar diplomatic backlash
- Assassination of Qasem Soleimani—US airstrike that killed Iranian General Qasem Soleimani in January 2020
- Assassination of Ismail Haniyeh—targeted killing of Hamas leader Ismail Haniyeh in Tehran in July 2024
- 2024 Hezbollah headquarters strike—large-scale Israeli airstrike that assassinated Hezbollah leader Hassan Nasrallah and other top Hezbollah leaders in September 2024
- August 2025 Israeli attack on Sanaa—targeted killing by Israel that killed many Houthi government members two weeks prior
- Assassination of Mahmoud Al-Mabhouh—2010 Israeli assassination of Hamas's logistics officer in the United Arab Emirates
