= Nizar Awadallah =

Palestinian politician (born 1957)

- نزار عوض الله
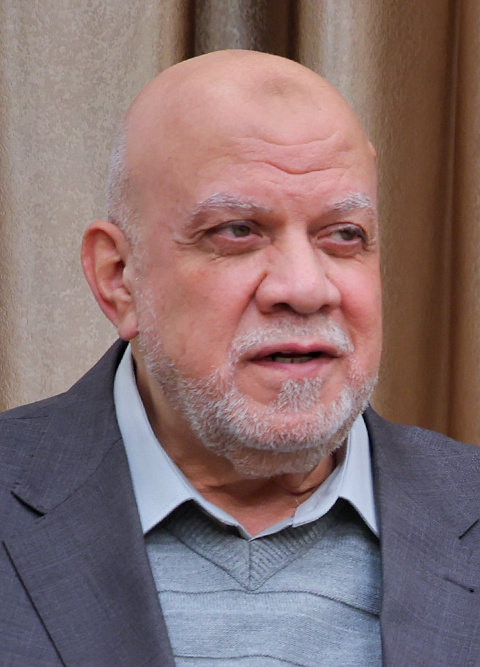
- Awadallah in 2025

Chairman of the Hamas Shura Council
- In office ???–???
- Preceded by: Unknown (likely Abdel Aziz al-Rantisi)
- Succeeded by: Unknown (likely Osama Mazini)

Chairman of the Hamas Political Bureau
- Acting
- In office 16 October 2024 – 20 July 2026 Serving with Khaled Mashal, Khalil al-Hayya, Muhammad Ismail Darwish, and Zaher Jabarin
- Preceded by: Yahya Sinwar
- Succeeded by: Khalil al-Hayya

Member of Hamas Political Bureau
- Incumbent
- Assumed office 2009
- Chairman: Khaled Mashal (2009–2017); Ismail Haniyeh (2017–2024); Yahya Sinwar (2024); Hamas temporary committee (acting) (2024–2026); Khalil al-Hayya (2026–present)

3rd Chairman of the Hamas Political Bureau in the Gaza Strip
- In office 17 April 2004 – 11 June 2007
- Preceded by: Abdel Aziz al-Rantisi
- Succeeded by: Ismail Haniyeh

Personal details
- Born: Nizar Mohammed Awadallah; December 11, 1957 (age 68) (Egypt) Egyptian-occupied Gaza Strip
- Party: Hamas
- Education: Ain Shams University (BEng)
- Occupation: Politician

Nizar Mohammed Awadallah (Arabic: نزار محمد عوض الله, born 11 December 1957) is a Palestinian militant and politician who is serving as the member of Hamas Political Bureau in the Gaza Strip since 2009. He also served as one of the acting quinquevirate leadership of Hamas, alongside Khaled Mashal, Zaher Jabarin, Muhammad Ismail Darwish, and Khalil al-Hayya, after Yahya Sinwar was killed by the IDF in October 2024.

== Early life and education ==
Nizar Awadallah was born in the Gaza Strip in 1957. His family originates from the Palestinian town of Hamama, which became Northern Ashkelon after 1948. Awadallah studied civil engineering at Ain Shams University in Cairo.

== Early career ==
He served as the secretary of an organization called Mujama al-Islamiya, also known as the Islamic Centre, and is considered close to Sheikh Ahmed Yassin. He was arrested and imprisoned for six years (1989–1995) in an Israeli prison due to his involvement in an armed group called Mujahadin al-Filastayeen, translated as ‘Palestinian Holy Warriors’. He also served as the head of Mujama al-Islamiya.

== Political career ==
He was assigned to lead the Hamas movement after the movement's victory in the 2006 legislative elections. He led the negotiations on behalf of Hamas in the Gilad Shalit deal. He was elected a member of the Hamas Political Bureau in 2009. His house was bombed by Israeli Air Force planes during the 2008–2009 Gaza war and the 2014 Gaza War.

In the internal elections for the leadership of the Hamas government in Gaza, held on March 9, 2021, he defeated Yahya Sinwar in the first round by a margin of 7 votes. Sinwar defeated him in the fourth round.

On December 13, 2023, the US Department of the Treasury designated Nizar Awadallah as a Specially Designated Global Terrorist linked to Hamas.

In December 2023, it was reported that Awadallah was killed in an airstrike as part of the Gaza war. According to another report, he was seriously injured. Awadallah's death was not confirmed by Hamas nor the IDF.

According to Arabic newspaper Asharq Al-Awsat, Awadallah has been a key figure in negotiations during the Gaza war. He currently resides in Doha, Qatar.
