= Hamas temporary committee =

Palestinian organization's ad hoc governing body

- لجنة حماس المؤقتة
- Emblem of Hamas

Government overview
- Formed: 31 July 2024
- Preceding Government: Ismail Haniyeh
- Dissolved: 20 July 2026
- Type: Provisional government
- Jurisdiction: Gaza Strip
- Headquarters: Doha, Qatar
- Government executives: Khaled Mashal; Khalil al-Hayya; Muhammad Ismail Darwish; Zaher Jabarin; Unnamed official

The Hamas temporary committee (Arabic: لجنة حماس المؤقتة) was a five-person ruling committee that was formed by Hamas following the assassination of Ismail Haniyeh on 31 July 2024 to facilitate decision-making given the difficulty of communicating with the newly appointed chairman, Yahya Sinwar, who was based in the Gaza Strip. The committee is based in Doha, Qatar, and is tasked with making strategic decisions and governing Hamas during the Gaza war and "exceptional circumstances". It was made up of five members: Khaled Mashal, Khalil al-Hayya, Zaher Jabarin, who represent the Palestinian diaspora, the Gaza Strip and the West Bank, respectively, as well as chairman of the Shura Council Muhammad Ismail Darwish, and an unnamed official who serves as secretary of the Political Bureau.

Following the killing of Sinwar in Rafah on 16 October, the committee initially discussed the possibility of appointing a single successor, but eventually opted to rule Hamas through the committee until the scheduled leadership elections in March 2025.

On 24 October 2024, Hamas confirmed that it was discussing a successor to Sinwar and that it would announce their name once the selection process was complete.

On 9 September 2025, all members of the temporary committee were targeted in the Israeli attack on Doha; the airstrike failed to assassinate the leadership of Hamas in Qatar.

On 20 July 2026, the temporary committee announced that Khalil al-Hayya would takeover as overall leader, therefore dissolving the committee.

== Members ==
Portrait	Name (Birth–Death)	Position	Residence	Ref.
	Khaled Mashal خالد مشعل (born 1956)	Former chairman of the Hamas political bureau from 1996 to 2017 and Hamas representative for the Palestinian diaspora	Doha, Qatar	
	Khalil al-Hayya خليل الحية (born 1960)	Deputy chairman of the Hamas political bureau since 2024 and Hamas representative for the Gaza Strip	Doha, Qatar	
	Zaher Jabarin زاهر جبارين (born 1968)	Leader of the Hamas financial bureau since the mid-2010s and Hamas representative and leader in the West Bank since 2024	Turkey	
	Muhammad Ismail Darwish محمد إسماعيل درويش	Chairman of the Hamas Shura council since 2023	Doha, Qatar	
	Unnamed official (Note: Likely Mousa Abu Marzook (born 1951), widely quoted in the media as vice-president of Hamas or Hamas President of External Relations.)	Secretary of the political bureau whose identity remains classified for security reasons	Doha, Qatar	

== See also ==
- List of leaders of Hamas
