= Suhail al-Hindi =

Palestinian politician

Suheil Ahmad Hassan al-Hindi is a Palestinian politician and education administrator who is a leader in Hamas. He has been a member of the Hamas Political Bureau since 2017.

Between 2011 and 2017, al-Hindi was chairman of the UNRWA Palestinian workers' union in Gaza, also known as the Arab Employees Union, and principal of the Palestine Boys' Elementary School, an UNRWA school. UNRWA suspended al-Hindi in 2011 and 2017 for political involvement with Hamas, in contravention of the agency's rules.

== Biography ==
Al-Hindi joined the Muslim Brotherhood in 1981 and was involved in student politics in Ramallah.

=== UNRWA ===
Between 2011 and 2017, al-Hindi was chairman of the UNRWA Palestinian workers' union (also called the Arab Employees Union) in Gaza and principal of the Palestine Boys' Elementary School, an UNRWA school.

UNRWA suspended al-Hindi in September 2011 for 3 months without pay for participating in a union event attended by Hamas officials including Deputy Chief of the Hamas Political Bureau Ismail Haniyeh and founder Ahmed Yassin. Israel has accused UNRWA of cooperating with militants. In protest of the suspension, the Arab Employees Union, which al-Hindi headed, held a sit-in at the main gate of Gaza City and closed all UNRWA facilities for 2 hours on 20 September, according to Hamas-affiliated Palinfo. According to Al Jazeera Arabic, al-Hindi's suspension was the straw that broke the camel's back in relations between Hamas and UNRWA, leading to Hamas publicly criticizing the agency. According to analyst Issam Adwan, Hamas had grown frustrated with recent UNRWA actions, including al-Hindi's suspension, measures related to teaching the Holocaust to Palestinian students, and refusal to employ political figures associated with Hamas.

=== Hamas leadership ===
As early as 2012, Israel claimed that it had informed UNRWA that al-Hindi was a Hamas activist. Israel alleged that al-Hindi was elected to the 20-member Hamas Political Bureau, the leadership body of Hamas, in a 13 February 2017 secret election. Al-Hindi denied reports of his election, as UNRWA forbids staff from holding political office. After an initial internal investigation, UNRWA announced in a 24 February statement that it had "neither uncovered nor received evidence to contradict" al-Hindi's denial. On 26 February, UNRWA suspended al-Hindi after receiving "substantial information." Israel has long claimed that some of UNRWA's Palestinian employees support terrorist activities and spread antisemitism.

Sometime after his election to the Political Bureau, al-Hindi moved from Gaza to Turkey, where he is under the protection of the Erdogan government, which supports Hamas.

Al-Hindi was chairman of the 2018–2019 Gaza border protests.

==== Gaza war ====
Following the death of Hamas leader Saleh al-Arouri in January 2024, al-Hindi became a prominent spokesman for Hamas in Turkey, staging pro-Hamas events alongside Turkish Islamist organizations, including at the Fatih Mosque in Istanbul. Al-Hindi spoke alongside Enver Kılıçarslan, who delivered an antisemitic speech depicting Jews as monkeys and pigs. At an event in Bursa, al-Hindi praised the October 7 attacks, saying "These brave individuals, the Al-Qassam Brigades, have brought the Zionists to their knees and instilled fear in them."

In light of UNRWA's suspension of employees for involvement in the October 7 attacks on Israel, al-Hindi's case from 2017 was brought up in the news media. As Hamas Political Bureau member and senior Hamas official, al-Hindi represented Hamas' position on negotiations during the Gaza war in May, August 2024, and April 2025. After the assassination of Hamas leader Ismail Hanieyh, al-Hindi told the Washington Post that, "While his death will undoubtedly leave an impact, this wound will soon be healed."

== See also ==
- UNRWA and Israel
