= Khalil al-Hayya =

Palestinian politician (born 1960)

- خليل الحية
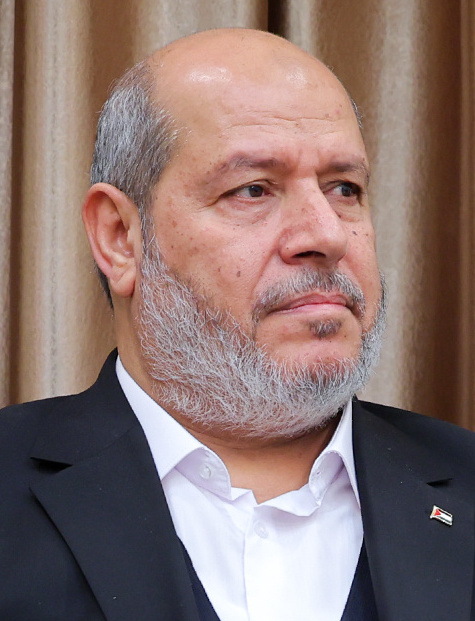
- Al-Hayya in 2025

5th Chairman of the Hamas Political Bureau
- Incumbent
- Assumed office 20 July 2026
- Deputy: Vacant
- Preceded by: Yahya Sinwar; Hamas temporary committee (acting)
- Acting; 16 October 2024 – 20 July 2026 Serving with Khaled Mashal, Zaher Jabarin, Muhammad Ismail Darwish, and Nizar Awadallah
- Preceded by: Yahya Sinwar
- Succeeded by: Himself

4th Deputy Chairman of the Hamas Political Bureau
- In office 6 August – 16 October 2024
- Chairman: Yahya Sinwar
- Preceded by: Saleh al-Arouri
- Succeeded by: Vacant

Member of the Palestinian Legislative Council
- Incumbent
- Assumed office 18 February 2006
- Constituency: Gaza City Governorate

6th Chairman of the Hamas Political Bureau in the Gaza Strip
- Acting; 16 October 2024 – c. 20 July 2026
- Preceded by: Yahya Sinwar
- Succeeded by: Ali al-Amoudi

Personal details
- Born: 5 November 1960 (age 65) Gaza City, Egyptian-administered Gaza Strip, Palestine, United Arab Republic
- Party: Hamas (1987–present)
- Other political affiliations: Muslim Brotherhood (1980–1987)
- Spouse(s): Ummu Osama (dead 2007); Amal al-Hayya
- Children: 7
- Education: Islamic University of Gaza (BA); University of Jordan (MA); University of the Holy Quran and Islamic Sciences (PhD)
- Occupation: Politician, lecturer
- Nickname: Abu Osama (kunya)

Khalil al-Hayya (Arabic: خليل الحية, romanized: Ḫalīl al-Ḥayya; born 5 November 1960) is a Palestinian politician and founding member of Hamas who has served as the 5th and current chairman of the Hamas Political Bureau since July 2026.

A close associate of Yahya Sinwar, Hamas' chairman and de facto leader in 2024, al-Hayya succeeded Saleh al-Arouri as deputy chairman following al-Arouri's assassination in January, serving under Sinwar from August to October that year. After Sinwar was killed by the IDF in October 2024, al-Hayya served alongside Khaled Mashal, Zaher Jabarin, Muhammad Ismail Darwish, and Nizar Awadallah in Hamas' acting quinquevirate leadership.

Before entering politics, al-Hayya was a lecturer who served as dean of student affairs at the Islamic University of Gaza and as a member of the Association of Palestinian Scholars. He has represented Gaza City in the Palestinian Legislative Council since February 2006. On 9 September 2025, he and several other Hamas leaders survived an Israeli assassination attempt in an airstrike in Qatar.

== Early life and education ==
Al-Hayya was born in Gaza City on November 5, 1960, and lived through the Israeli occupation of the Gaza Strip after the Six-Day War. During the occupation, the IDF counducted raids on Al-Hayya's family home and arrested his relatives. In March 1980, Al-Hayya met Hamas founder Ahmed Yassin, which inspired him to become an activist.

In 1983, Al-Hayya graduated from the Islamic University of Gaza with a bachelor's degree. He served as the dean of student affairs during his studies. In 1986, Al-Hayya received a master's degree from the University of Jordan, and in 1997, he received a doctorate in hadith studies from Sudan.

Al-Hayya joined the Muslim Brotherhood in the early 1980s and Hamas in 1987. He participated in the First Intifada and was arrested and imprisoned by the IDF multiple times, spending three years in Israeli prisons. During the First Intifiada, Al-Hayya worked as a part-time teacher.

== Political career ==
Al-Hayya has been a Hamas official for decades. He was regarded a close associate of former Hamas leader Yahya Sinwar, and has been described as "one of the few people whom Sinwar felt he could rely on."

Al-Hayya participated in the 2006 Palestinian legislative election and won a seat in the Palestinian Legislative Council. Following the election, al-Hayya condemned Palestinian Authority President Mahmoud Abbas during a rally in Gaza City, accusing him of launching a "war against God and Hamas" amid escalating violence between their factions. He declared that Hamas would not accept a referendum or new elections, asserting their parliamentary mandate following their electoral victory.

In November 2019, al-Hayya and Rawhi Mushtaha led a delegation that departed from the Gaza Strip to visit several countries, including Turkey and Lebanon. Prior to this trip, the delegation reportedly met with Egyptian intelligence officials in Cairo.

Al-Hayya has also headed reconciliation talks with Hamas's rival Fatah. In January 2022, he visited Algeria alongside Husam Badran for intra-Palestinian reconciliation discussions between Hamas and Fatah, following an invitation from Algerian President Abdelmajid Tebboune.

In October 2022, al-Hayya announced that he and representatives from other Palestinian factions held a "historic" meeting with Syrian President Bashar al-Assad in Damascus, marking the first such meeting in a decade. Al-Hayya stated that they agreed to end the rift between Hamas and Syria, which began when Hamas refused to support the Assad regime during the Syrian civil war. He expressed regret for any "mistaken action" taken against Syria in the past and emphasized the importance of the meeting in relaunching joint Palestinian-Syrian efforts. Al-Hayya praised Syria for its longstanding support of the Palestinian cause and noted that Assad reaffirmed Syria's commitment to backing the Palestinian “resistance.”

Al-Hayya represented Hamas during indirect negotiations with Israel for a hostage and ceasefire deal during the Gaza war. Following the killing of Yahya Sinwar in October 2024, al-Hayya was considered a strong candidate to succeed him as the head of Hamas’s political office.

Secret meeting minutes reviewed by The New York Times revealed that in July 2023, al-Hayya discussed plans of the October 7 attacks with senior Iranian commander Mohammed Said Izadi of Iran’s Islamic Revolutionary Guards Corps, who was based in Lebanon and helped oversee Tehran’s relations with Palestinian armed groups. The minutes indicated that al-Hayya informed Izadi that Hamas required assistance in targeting sensitive sites during the initial phase of the attack.

On 20 July 2026, al-Hayya was elected chairman of Hamas's political bureau in an internal run-off election against Khaled Mashal within the Hamas Shura Council, winning in a narrow margin.

== Political views ==
He has advocated for maintaining strong relations with Iran.

In 2009, al-Hayya addressed coercive measures, such as mandates for female lawyers to wear hijabs and prohibitions on public touching, stating, "Neither the government nor Hamas has come out with any decision regarding such orders. We are an Islamic resistance movement that will never oblige anyone against his or her will. Advice is the best tactic." His remarks came amid tensions with extremist factions advocating for stricter religious enforcement in Gaza.

In 2011, al-Hayya called on the United Nations to recognize Palestine within its pre-1948 borders.

Al-Hayya said Hamas attacked Israel on October 7th since it was necessary to "change the entire equation and not just have a clash," he also said: “We succeeded in putting the Palestinian issue back on the table, and now no one in the region is experiencing calm." Speaking to The New York Times, he said that Hamas's goal is not "to run Gaza and bring it water and electricity" but to renew attention on the Palestinian cause, and he said Hamas began October 7 to tell people that the Palestinian cause would not die.

In November 2021, al-Hayya stated in an interview with Al Jazeera that the Palestinian Authority (PA) is “no longer accepted” by the Palestinian people, claiming it has become a burden on the Palestinian cause. He called for a redefinition of the PA’s role based on a comprehensive national vision and emphasized the need for a revamped leadership "on the basis of a political program representing all the Palestinians and a mechanism for confronting the occupation." He condemned the security coordination between PA forces and Israel in the West Bank and blamed Abbas for the rift between the West Bank and Gaza Strip.

In November 2023, al-Hayya called the October 7 attack "a great act", and stated that Hamas leadership knew that "the reaction to this great act would be big".

In April 2024, al-Hayya said that Hamas would agree to a ceasefire with Israel, lay down its arms and transform into a political party if an independent Palestinian state is established on the pre-1967 borders. He also clarified that the proposed Palestinian state would require "the return of Palestinian refugees" to present-day Israel.

In October 2024, after the killing of Yahya Sinwar, al-Hayya said that "Hamas is moving forward until the establishment of the Palestinian state on all Palestinian soil with Jerusalem as its capital."

In January 2025, al-Hayya called the October 7 attack a "historic moment" and praised the attack as a "military accomplishment" and "a source of pride for our people… to be passed down from generation to generation".

== Assassination attempt ==
On 9 September 2025, al-Hayya and other Hamas leaders were targeted by an Israeli airstrike on a residential compound housing Hamas officials in Doha, Qatar. His son Himam and office director Jihad Labad were confirmed to have been killed in the strike.

== Personal life ==
Seven or eight of al-Hayya's relatives, including his wife, three of his children, and three of his brothers, were killed by Israeli strikes on his home in 2007, in a failed assassination attempt on him. One of his sons was killed by an Israeli airstrike in 2008 while leading a rocket brigade. Another son, daughter-in-law, and grandson were killed by an airstrike on his home in July 2014 during the 2014 Gaza War.

During a news conference amid widespread protests over severe electricity shortages, al-Hayya stated "I suffer like you. I don’t have electricity in my home" and attributed delays in upgrading the electricity supply lines to the Palestinian Authority.

In 2025, The New Arab reported that he resided in the neighborhood of Shuja'iyya until "several years ago".

Another of al-Hayaa's sons, Himam al-Hayaa, was killed in the Israeli attack on Doha on 9 September 2025.

Another of al-Hayya's sons, Azzam al-Hayya, was killed following an Israeli air strike in Gaza on 6 May 2026.
