= Zaher Jabarin =

Hamas official (born 1968)

- زاهر جبارين
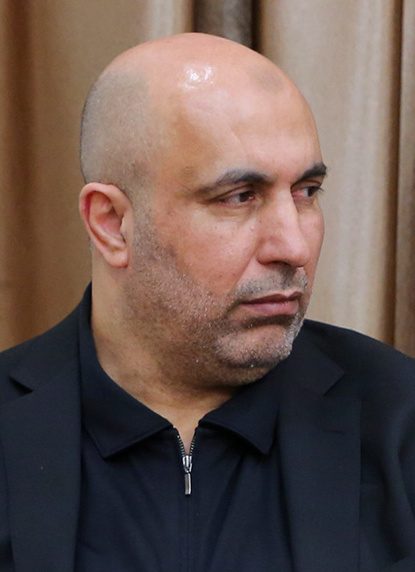
- Jabarin in 2024

Chairman of the Hamas Political Bureau
- Acting
- In office 16 October 2024 – 20 July 2026 Serving with Khaled Mashal, Khalil al-Hayya, Muhammad Ismail Darwish, and Nizar Awadallah
- Preceded by: Yahya Sinwar
- Succeeded by: Khalil al-Hayya

Office of Martyrs, Wounded, and Prisoners
- Incumbent
- Assumed office 2021
- Constituency: Palestinians in Israeli custody

Leader of the Hamas Financial Bureau
- Incumbent
- Assumed office mid-2010s

Leader of Hamas in the West Bank
- Incumbent
- Assumed office 2024
- Preceded by: Saleh al-Arouri
- Constituency: West Bank, Palestine

Deputy leader of Hamas in the West Bank (Deputy to Saleh al-Arouri)
- In office 2021 – January 2024
- Constituency: West Bank, Palestine

Member of Hamas politburo
- Incumbent

Personal details
- Born: 18 September 1968 (age 58) Salfit, Israeli-occupied West Bank
- Party: Hamas
- Portfolio: Martyrs, Wounded, and Prisoners
- Prisoner of Israel: 1993 to 2011 (18 years); * 1988 (11 months)

Military service
- Allegiance: Palestinian resistance
- Branch/service: Qassam Brigades (Hamas)
- Years of service: 1987 to 1993
- Battles/wars: First Intifada

Zaher Jabarin (Arabic: زاهر جبارين; born 18 September 1968) is a member of the Political Bureau of the Islamic Resistance Movement (Hamas) and serves as Hamas' financial administrator.

He has led the Hamas Financial Bureau since the mid-2010s, managing the group's investment portfolio, estimated to be over $500 million. The financial network Jabarin oversees raises, invests, and launders money destined for Hamas military operations in the West Bank and Gaza Strip via networks in Turkey, Lebanon, and the Persian Gulf.

With Saleh al-Arouri, Jabarin was one of the co-founders of Hamas' military wing in the West Bank in the late 1980s. In 1993, Jabarin was arrested and an Israeli military court sentenced him to life imprisonment plus 35 years for killing Israelis during the First Intifada. Jabarin was released as part of the Gilad Shalit prisoner exchange in 2011, after which he assumed leadership of the Hamas Financial Bureau from his base in Istanbul, Turkey. He was also head of the Office of Martyrs, Wounded, and Prisoners for Hamas.

During the Gaza war, after al-Arouri was killed in Dahieh on 2 January 2024, Jabarin succeeded him as Hamas' leader in the West Bank. Jabarin was allegedly responsible for the resumption of Hamas' planning and incitement of suicide bombings against Israeli civilians, including the Lehi Street bombing in Tel Aviv on 18 August 2024, as the group's capabilities in Gaza diminished and Hamas leaders were assassinated.

== Early life and family ==
Jabarin was born on 18 September 1968, in Salfit, in the area also known as Samaria, in the West Bank region of occupied Palestine.

Jabarin studied Islamic law at Al-Najah University in Nablus. He got involved in politics as a student.

Jabarin's mother died while he was in prison, and his father died while he was in exile. When Jabarin left prison (as part of the Gilad Shalit prisoner exchange) he was not allowed to see his father before leaving the country.

== Hamas activities ==
=== Founding of the Qassam Brigades ===
Jabarin joined Hamas in 1987 and helped to found the Qassam Brigades, Hamas's military wing, leading its expansion into the northern West Bank. During the First Intifada, Jabarin led a youth brigade called "The Shooting Squads". He was credited for recruiting Yahya Ayyash, an expert in IEDs and one of the planners of the abduction and killing of Nissim Toledano.

He has been responsible for attacks that killed Israeli soldiers and police. Jabarin has denied that he and the rest of Hamas' political wing are directly involved with the Qassam Brigades, "al-Qassam have their own ties, different from those of the political wing".

=== Imprisonment and exile ===
He was shot in the leg while throwing stones as a student, and then imprisoned for ten months in 1988.

In 1993, the Shin Bet arrested Jabarin and sentenced him to life in prison, plus 35 years, for his involvement in killing Israelis, including an Israeli police officer in 1993.

After his arrest, Jabarin learned Hebrew, earned a degree, and wrote a book, with by Saleh al-Arouri. It was published after his release from prison.

He was released in the Gilad Shalit prisoner exchange in 2011. His mother died while he was in solitary confinement at Hadarim Prison. (Note: English spelling from The Times of Israel: "Hadarim Prison".)

Jabarin was exiled to Damascus, Syria, and spent years living between Qatar and Turkey, ultimately settling in Istanbul, where he assumed leadership of the Hamas Financial Bureau. In Istanbul, Jabarin was a deputy to Saleh al-Arouri, who lived in Turkey until 2016.

=== Leadership and prisoner advocacy ===
Jabarin is a member of the Hamas Political Bureau. In 2021, Jabarin was elected as the deputy to Saleh al-Arouri as leader of Hamas in the West Bank. Jabarin was considered al-Arouri's right-hand man; Ynet referred to Arouri as "the West Bank's Mohammed Deif".

At this time he also took on a role in the management of prisoner affairs within Hamas. His position was head of the Office of Martyrs, Wounded, and Prisoners. In 2022 Jabarin said that liberating Palestinian prisoners in Israel was the most important priority.

In March 2023 Jabarin told the Shehab News Agency that the resistance would not abandon the Palestinians in Israeli custody to Israel's extremist national security minister Itamar Ben Gvir and the "Fascist Government" (Arabic: الحكومة الفاشية, romanized: al-hukūmat al-fāshīa, lit. 'fascist government') of Israel. Jabarin called on the Palestinian people to prepare for the battle with the occupier. At the time prominent Israelis and major international news sources were using similar language to refer to Israel's national security minister Itamar Ben Gvir (leader of the ultra-nationalist religious Zionist "Otzma Yehudit" party) and the Likud-led coalition government of Israel.

=== Financial management ===
In the 1980s and 1990s Jabrin and other members of Al-Qassam's leadership funded attacks from their own pockets, Hebrew media allege that some of the money was borrowed from his mother.

But by 2024 Jabarin was the long-time head of Hamas's Financial Bureau, often described as Hamas's CEO, and managing the group's investment portfolio estimated at over $500 million, including in Turkish real estate and stock markets, and overseeing revenue streams including private donations that exceed tens of millions of dollars per year. According to The Wall Street Journal and The Times of Israel, the financial network Jabarin oversees raises, invests, and launders money destined for Hamas militant activities in the West Bank and Gaza via networks in Turkey, Lebanon, and the Persian Gulf.

According to the United States Office of Foreign Assets Control Jabarin oversees Hamas's financial relationship with the Islamic Revolutionary Guard Corps' Qods Force, as the relationship between the Qods Force and Hamas focused on increasing funding from Iran. According to The Wall Street Journal and The Times of Israel, Jabarin's financial network operated with the tacit approval of Turkish president Recep Erdogan, and Jabarin himself has holdings in Turkish companies.

For these activities, the United States Office of Foreign Assets Control designated Jabarin a Specially Designated Global Terrorist in 2019, prohibiting all dealings with U.S. persons or within the United States. This was announced in a press release on the anniversary of the 2001 Al-Qaeda attacks on the United States. The announcement also included sanctions against people with alleged financial connections to ISIL, the anti-nationalist cult who declared war on Hamas the previous year, and killed two Hamas government border guards in a bombing at Rafah Crossing the year before. Hamas responded to that bombing with a crackdown on followers of the "deviant ideology".

Israeli sources told Reuters that Hamas' military budget was between $100 million to about $350 million per year, 98% to 99% lower than Israel's budget of $19 to $27 billion per year, which is 4.5% of Israel's GDP.

Funding of Hamas' civilian government in the Gaza Strip was unstable due to the three-way conflict between Israel, Hamas (in Gaza), and Fatah (led by President Abbas in Ramallah). For example, in 2017 President Abbas withheld taxes collected in the Gaza Strip and pressured Israel to further reduce the already limited electricity supply. During the Hamas government in the Gaza Strip many government employee salaries in the Gaza Strip still came via the Palestinian Authority controlled by the Abbas-led Fatah government in Ramallah, and the Fatah–Hamas conflict also caused instability in this funding, and in provision of basic services such as electricity.

== Gaza war ==
After the assassination of Saleh al-Arouri in Dahieh on 2 January 2024, Jabarin succeeded him as Hamas's commander in the West Bank. Jabarin was considered a potential successor to Hamas leader Ismail Haniyeh after Haniyeh's assassination in July due to his role in managing the group's finances and his relationship with Iran, Hamas's chief patron. Compared to Yahya Sinwar and al-Arouri, Jabarin is less-known publicly due to his location in Istanbul, Turkey. On addition he is not particularly sophisticated or charismatic, according to analysts and academics.

When Arouni was assassinated, Jabarin called on all factions in all locations to take revenge, particularly in the "48 areas" (referring to Israeli territory within the Green Line) and the West Bank region.

As of early 2024, Jabarin managed Hamas's prisoner portfolio and was involved in indirect negotiations over the Gaza war hostage crisis.

In a May 2024 interview with The New Arab, when asked about the role of the United States in negotiations, Jabarin said that the goals of the United States conflicted with Netanyahu's goals. Jabarin said that the United States wanted to avoid a regional war while Netanyahu's goal was to stay in power. He accused Netanyahu of obstructing United States' proposals to serve his own personal goals. Jabarin also said that Hamas had not yet used up all their options and that the West Bank would "surprise the enemy soon".

In late August 2023 Jabarin threatened Israeli extremist Minister for National Security Itamar Ben-Gvir. He was angry about Ben-Gvir's allegedly provocative behaviour at Al-Aqsa. Hamas, the United States Government, and the United Nations have all called for Ben-Gvir to stay away from Al-Aqsa. The Israeli opposition said that Ben-Gvir (then Israeli National Security Minister) risked the nation's security and the safety of its citizens. In late 2022 and late 2023 Israeli journalist Amos Harel, the military reporter for Haaretz, speculated that these provocations could trigger a "third intifada" (Palestinian Uprising). Hamas and Al-Qassam specifically cited these provocations, and Israeli settler violence in the West Bank, which was also exacerbated by Ben-Gvir, as motives for the 7 October attacks.

According to the Times of Israel, Jabarin was to blame for the resurgence of Hamas' use of suicide bombings in late August 2023, and Jabrin was responsible for dispatching the perpetrator of the Lehi Street bombing from Nablus to Tel Aviv.

== Resumption of suicide attacks ==
Israeli sources from his trial say that Jabarin, in collaboration with Yahya Ayyash, was one of the original developers of Hamas' suicide bombing campaign using both car bombs and human bombs. Early Hamas suicide bombers often aimed their attacks at bus loads of Palestinian workers travelling to Israel, because the saw them as traitors against the Palestinian nation.

According to the Times of Israel, Jabarin was to blame for the resurgence of Hamas' use of suicide bombings in late August 2023 as the group's capabilities in Gaza diminished.

Israeli officials believe that Jabarin was responsible for dispatching the perpetrator of the Lehi Street bombing from Nablus to Tel Aviv. ZAKA volunteers at the scene said the event was unusual, and that it reminded them of the 1990s when suicide bombings in Israel were more common. People in nearby buildings also did not expect that the explosion was a suicide bomber because those attacks were more typical of twenty years ago.

The bombing in Tel Aviv occurred less than three weeks after the assassination of Hamas' top political leader, Ismail Haniyeh. Haniyeh was a relative moderate within Hamas and had repeatedly offered a place deal in exchange for a fully sovereign Palestinian state on the land that Israel did not occupy until 1967.

Suicide bombings were always a controversial tactic that many Palestinians object to, even members of Hamas disagreed with each other about suicide bombings. In 2006, while Jabarin was still in Prison, Hamas won the 2006 Palestinian legislative election and Ismail Haniyeh became Prime Minister of Palestine, Hamas announced that they planned to stop suicide bombings. Hamas politician Yihiyeh Musa told the Guardian that suicide operations had been a strategy of desperation and he claimed they were conducted in response to Israeli attacks on Palestinians.

In recent years, Hamas in the Gaza Strip have been the target of suicide bombings. In 2017 two Hamas government border guards were killed by an ISIS suicide bomber at Rafah Crossing, one guard died immediately and the other died of his wounds later. ISIS are an anti-nationalist cult with an ideology that is fundamentally incompatible with the Palestinian nationalism of Hamas and their allies, ISIS particularly object to Hamas' international Shia Islamist allies. Hamas responded to that bombing with a crackdown on followers of the "deviant ideology" (their term for ISIS and similar extremist groups). The first guard who died was a 28-year-old man from the Gaza Strip. Palestinian defectors who had joined ISIS in the Sinai declared war on Hamas the following year, demanding Hamas release ISIS militants held in Gaza's prisons. Then in 2019, another suicide attack – also attributed to ISIS – directly targeted Gaza Strip police. Three police officers were killed, allegedly all three of whom were members of Hamas, and Gaza's Security forces responded by arresting ten people whom they suspected were members of the cell who arranged the attack.

After a speech on 29 August by former Hamas leader Khaled Meshaal declaring the group's intention to revive the use of suicide bombings, Hamas conducted four bombings against Israeli settlements in the West Bank and Jerusalem. The Times of Israel said that Hamas' return to bombings came amid perceptions within the militant group that Palestinians in the West Bank had not joined the fight against Israel. But the BBC reported that there had already been an increase in violence in the West Bank region since October 2023. In the propaganda video in which Mohammed Deif – the leader of the Qassam Brigades, based in the Gaza Strip – announced the 7 October attacks he called for others outside Gaza to join the attack against Israel, he gave a long list of suggestions that did not include explosives, and the speech did not directly encourage intentionally suicidal attacks. In 2014, left wing UK news outlet Novara Media attributed the Qassam Brigades' pausing suicide attacks to Mohammed Deif's leadership, but many of the earlier suicide bombings were attributed to Deif by pro-Israel sources.

== 2025 Qatar airstrike ==
On September 9, 2025, it was reported that Jabarin was present in the Hamas headquarters building in Doha, Qatar when it was struck by Israeli air strikes. Hamas stated that its entire leadership survived the attack.

== See also ==
- Marwan Barghouti
- Hamas temporary committee
- Palestinians in Israeli custody
- Gilad Shalit prisoner exchange
- List of prisoners released by Israel in the Gilad Shalit prisoner exchange
- Palestinian Prisoners' Document
- Palestinian suicide attacks (List)
- Martyrdom in Palestinian culture
