= Bislamach Brigade =

Israeli military unit

Coordinates: 31°00′43″N 34°51′35″E

- ביסלמ"ח
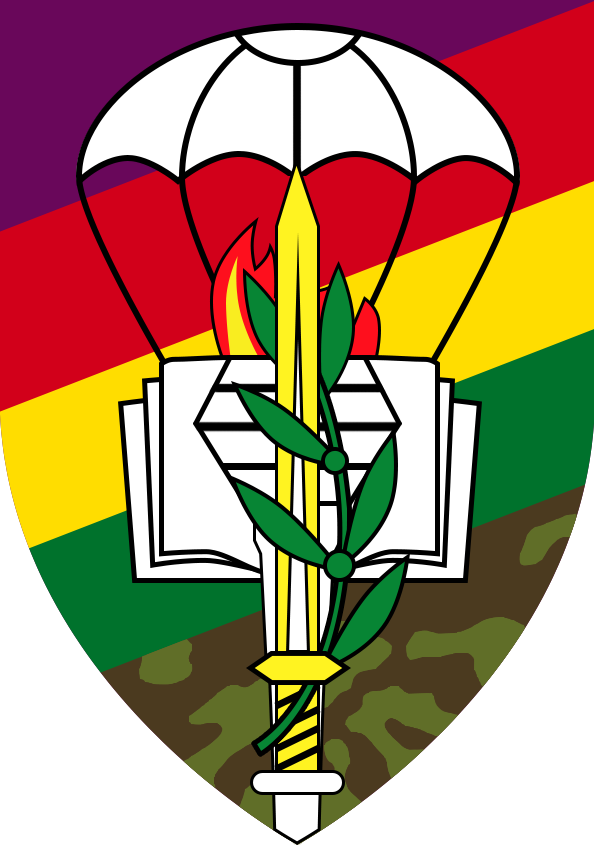
- Insignia of the School
- Active: 1974–present
- Country: Israel
- Type: Training
- Part of: Infantry Corps
- Engagements: Gaza war; Battle of Zikim; Battle of Hamad; Rafah offensive; Killing of Yahya Sinwar

The Bislamach (Note: Abbreviation from School for Infantry Corps Professions and Squad Commanders (Hebrew: בית ספר למקצועות חיל הרגלים ומפקדי חוליות, romanized: Beit Sefer LiMfakde Kitot UMiktzo'ot Heil HaRaglim) (Hebrew: ביסלמ"ח) is the Israel Defense Forces body responsible for the training of all Infantry Corps squad commanders and platoon sergeants.

Established in 1974 under the command of Yaakov Hasdai, the school comprises three operative battalions (17th, 906th, and 450th), ordinarily used for training. During wars or emergencies, as was the case during the Yom Kippur War, these serve as fully operational combat forces. Since 2006 these battalions form the 828th Brigade (formerly 772th Brigade), referred to as the Bislamach Brigade (formerly called Bislach Brigade).

The school has three bases, all located in the Negev. In wartime the School formes the Infantry Brigade "Bislamach".

Before Operation Rainbow, during the Al-Aqsa Intifada, the brigade's soldiers participated in searching the Philadelphi Route for the bodies of the soldiers from the Sayeret Yahalom, who were killed during the armoured personnel carrier disaster of May 11–12, 2004. They also took part in the Gaza disengagement plan, following which they were the first to hold the border with the Gaza Strip.

The 17th Battalion of the brigade was involved in combat in the Battle of Zikim, claiming to have killed four militants at Zikim Beach in a video posted to social media on 10 October 2023.

The unit later saw action in the Bureij Camp in late December 2023. At the start of March the unit replaced the 89th paratroopers brigade in Khan Younis. In May of the same year, the unit saw action in North Gaza.

On October 16, 2024, the brigade's 17th Battalion unexpectedly encountered Yahya Sinwar in Rafah, and killed him in a shootout; his identity was determined after the firefight via DNA matching and dental records.

== Organization ==
- 828th Infantry Brigade "Bislamach"
  - 17th Infantry Battalion "Golan Lions" (trains 1st Infantry Brigade "Golani" and 84th Infantry Brigade "Givati" troops)
  - 450th Infantry Battalion "Flying Lions" (trains 35th Paratroopers Brigade and 900th Infantry Brigade "Kfir" troops)
  - 906th Infantry Battalion "Negev Foxes" (trains 933rd Infantry Brigade "Nahal" troops and the personnel of the infantry brigades' reconnaissance battalions)
  - (6828th) Reconnaissance Battalion (Reserve)
  - 749th Combat Engineer Battalion (Reserve)
  - 828th Logistics Battalion (Reserve)
  - Signals Company (Reserve)
