= Osama Mazini =

Palestinian political leader (1966–2023)

- أسامة مزيني
- Mazini in 2023

Chairman of the Hamas Shura Council
- In office 16 March 2021 – 16 October 2023
- Preceded by: Unknown (likely Nizar Awadallah)
- Succeeded by: Muhammad Ismail Darwish

Minister of Education of the Gaza Strip
- In office 14 June 2007 – 2 June 2014
- Prime Minister: Ismail Haniyeh
- Preceded by: Office established

Personal details
- Born: 16 March 1966 Gaza City, Egyptian-administered Gaza Strip, Palestine
- Died: 16 October 2023 (aged 57) Gaza Strip, Palestine
- Party: Hamas
- Education: Ain Shams University; Islamic University of Gaza
- Occupation: Politician

Osama Mazini (Arabic: أسامة مزيني; 16 March 1966 – 16 October 2023) was a Palestinian politician who served as the chairman of the Hamas Shura Council from March 2021 until his assassination in October 2023. A senior member of Hamas, he was also a member of the Hamas Political Bureau in Gaza until his assassination during the Gaza War.

Mazini was in charge of negotiation affairs dealing with captured Israeli soldier Gilad Shalit.

In a 2006 sermon, he criticized Pope Benedict XVI over the latter's remarks on Islam, saying that the pontiff was "ignorant and stupid", "criminal and arrogant", and "a cruel man, spilling blood, who strove to kill".

During the 2008–2009 Gaza War, Mazini warned Israel about sending in ground forces, stating "the people of Gaza are waiting to see the Zionist enemy in Gaza to tear them into pieces of flesh."

In the aftermath of the October 7 attacks on Israel, Mazini was a member of the Hamas Political Bureau in Gaza. Mazini was killed in an airstrike conducted by the Israeli Air Force on 16 October 2023 during the Gaza war. He was 57. Hamas confirmed his death on 21 October.
