= List of leaders of Hamas =

Chairman of the Hamas Political Bureau
- رئيس المكتب السياسي لحركة حماس (Arabic) Ra’īs al-Maktab as-Siasi li-Ḥarakat Ḥamās
- Emblem of Hamas

- Flag of Hamas

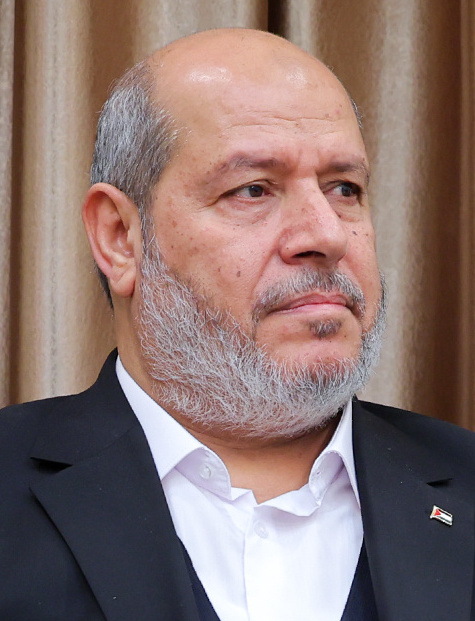
- Incumbent; Khalil al-Hayya since 20 July 2026
- Type: Political party office
- Status: Political party leader
- Member of: Hamas; Shura Council of Hamas; Political Bureau of Hamas; ~~Al-Qassam Brigades~~ (Note: The fifth de facto leader and chairman of Hamas Political Bureau, Yahya Sinwar, was the one and only Hamas leader directly involved with the Al-Qassam Brigades and fight with the militants on the front line until he was killed by the IDF in October 2024. He was directly involved in some Israeli–Palestinian conflict, like the First Palestinian Intifada and 2021 Israel–Palestine crisis.)
- Residence: Gaza Strip, Palestine (Note: The first and second chairman of Hamas Shura Council resides in Gaza Strip, Palestine, before both of them were assassinated by an Israeli strike. They led the overall Hamas there, although the headquarter (HQ) of Hamas was moved to Amman, Jordan in 1992. The first and second leaders of Hamas led here until 2004, where the full power of Hamas leadership was transferred from chairman of Hamas Shura Council to chairman of Hamas Political Bureau.) (1987–2004); Amman, Jordan (Note: The first and second chairman of Hamas Political Bureau resides in Amman, Jordan. They also open their headquarter (HQ) there since the creation of this position in Hamas (Chairman of Hamas Political Bureau).) (1992–1999); Doha, Qatar (1999–2001); Damascus, Syria (2001–2012); Doha, Qatar (2012–2024); Cairo, Egypt (2012–2024); Gaza Strip, Palestine (Note: Yahya Sinwar resided in Gaza Strip, previously led the Hamas government there since February 2017 until his killing in October 2024.) (2024); Doha, Qatar (Note: Temporarily led by a council consisting of Khaled Mashal, Khalil al-Hayya, Zaher Jabarin, Muhammad Ismail Darwish, and an unnamed senior member of Hamas.) (2024–present) (Note: However, on 8 November 2024, Hamas was asked by Qatar authorities to leave the country by the U.S. request following Hamas's rejection weeks ago of another hostage release proposal.)
- Nominator: Political Bureau of Hamas
- Appointer: Shura Council of Hamas
- Term length: Four years, renewable; (Two term limit) (Note: However, Khaled Mashal period as chairman of Hamas Political Bureau was extended twice.)
- Constituting instrument: 1988 Hamas charter
- Formation: 10 December 1987; 38 years ago 17 April 2004; 22 years ago
- First holder: Ahmed Yassin (as the Chairman of the Hamas Shura Council); Khaled Mashal (as the Chairman of the Hamas Political Bureau)
- Deputy: Vacant (Note: The post will remain vacant until March 2025. Khalil al-Hayya, who served as the previous deputy chairman of the Hamas Political Bureau under Yahya Sinwar, was promoted to become a member of the five-person leadership that will lead Hamas until the next election that will take place in March 2025.) (as the Deputy Chairman of the Hamas Political Bureau, since 16 October 2024)

The chairman of the Hamas Political Bureau (Arabic: رئيس المكتب السياسي لحركة حماس, romanized: Ra’īs al-Maktab as-Siasi li-Ḥarakat Ḥamās), also known as the chairman of the Hamas Shura Council (Arabic: رئيس مجلس شورى لحركة حماس, romanized: Ra’īs Majlis Shūra li-Ḥarakat Ḥamās) from 1987 until 2004, is the overall and de facto leader of Hamas, a Palestinian Sunni Islamist political and military organisation that has been governing the Gaza Strip since 2007. The position is currently held by Khalil al-Hayya, who was elected in July 2026.

The chairman of the Hamas Political Bureau is expected to oversee the organization and its various components, while military operations are managed separately by military commanders. The chairman serves as a figurehead for Hamas during Palestinian elections and becomes the central leader in the operations against Israeli occupation. Additionally, he plays a crucial role in foreign relations, leading negotiations with Israeli officials regarding peace processes, fostering reconciliation with Fatah, and enhancing ties with other Middle Eastern countries.

== History ==
Ahmed Yassin, the founder of Hamas, became the first chairman of the Hamas Shura Council and de facto leader of Hamas from December 1987 until March 2004. Following his assassination, his deputy, Abdel Aziz al-Rantisi took over for only 26 days before he was assassinated by Israel.

The chairman of the Hamas Political Bureau, Khaled Mashal, took over Hamas leadership; he was declared the overall and de facto leader of Hamas from April 2004. Although he had held this position from 1996, he was not the overall leader of Hamas: the chairman of the Hamas Shura Council at that time was considered to be the de facto leader. Hamas elected Mousa Abu Marzook, the previous political bureau's chairman, as the deputy chairman of Hamas Political Bureau in January 1997.

In May 2017, Ismail Haniyeh, the deputy chairman of Hamas Political Bureau, was elected by the Hamas Shura Council as the chairman of Hamas Political Bureau. Hamas also elected Saleh al-Arouri as the deputy chairman of Hamas Political Bureau. However, Al-Arouri was assassinated by an Israeli strike in January 2024. Six months later, Haniyeh was assassinated in Iran while attending for the inauguration ceremony of the President of Iran, Masoud Pezeshkian.

On 31 July 2024, Khaled Mashal was selected as the acting chairman of Hamas Political Bureau until the new leader was elected. Mashal, the then-chairman of the Hamas Political Bureau, was expected to lead Hamas again.

On 5 August 2024, Muhammad Ismail Darwish was expected to become the next chairman of Hamas Political Bureau. Before this, he serving as the chairman of the Hamas Shura Council from October 2023, succeeded Osama Mazini, after his killing on 16 October 2023 by Israeli strike.

However, on 6 August 2024, Yahya Sinwar was officially appointed as the next chairman of Hamas Political Bureau and de facto leader of Hamas, six days after the assassination of his predecessor, Ismail Haniyeh. The announcement came after the Shura Council, the body that elects Hamas' politburo, voted unanimously to choose Sinwar as the new leader, in what was described by a Hamas official as a "message of defiance to Israel". Khalil al-Hayya was selected as the deputy chairman of Hamas Political Bureau on the same day. Previously, Al-Hayya was the deputy leader of Hamas in the Gaza Strip.

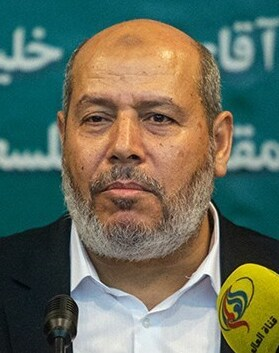
Khalil al-Hayya, previous deputy chairman of the Hamas Political Bureau who served from 6 August 2024 until 16 October 2024, when Yahya Sinwar was killed by the IDF. He is also serving as the deputy leader of Hamas in the Gaza Strip since 2017.

On 16 October 2024, Sinwar was killed after leading Hamas for only two and a half months.

In the aftermath, Khaled Mashal was performing duties again as acting de facto leader of Hamas, for the second time, until the new leader was elected.

Sinwar recommended that, in case of his death, Hamas appoint a council of leaders to govern and manage the transition following his death. The Sinwar's recommended council include:

- Khaled Mashal, second chairman of the Hamas Political Bureau (1996–2017) and current chairman of Hamas Political Bureau in the Diaspora / Palestinian Abroad (2017–present)
- Khalil al-Hayya, current deputy chairman of the Hamas Political Bureau (2024) and current chairman of the Hamas Political Bureau in the Gaza Strip (2017–present)
- Zaher Jabarin, current chairman of the Hamas Political Bureau in the West Bank (2024–present)
- Muhammad Ismail Darwish, current chairman of Hamas Shura Council (2023–present)
- Unknown, known to be as the current secretary of the Hamas Political Bureau (Note: According to the Saudi channel Al-Hadth, this may be Nizar Awadallah, a senior Hamas official in Gaza, who almost defeated Yahya Sinwar in the 2021 Hamas elections for the leadership in the Gaza Strip.) (Note: Some media also speculated that Mousa Abu Marzook, as he widely quoted in the media as vice-president of Hamas or President of External Relations for Hamas.) (Note: The name of the fifth member was not published by Hamas "for security reasons".)

The Hamas official indicated that Khalil al-Hayya has assumed responsibility for most political and foreign affairs in addition to his direct oversight of Gaza-related matters and is effectively the acting de facto leader of Hamas.

There were a number of potential successors, including Khaled Mashal, second chairman of Hamas Political Bureau from 1996 until 2017, Mohammed Sinwar, brother of Yahya Sinwar and one of the leaders of the Ezzedeen Al-Qassam Brigades, Zaher Jabarin, current Hamas leader in the West Bank, and Khalil al-Hayya, current deputy chairman of Hamas Political Bureau since 2024 and longtime deputy of Yahya Sinwar in Gaza Strip.

In May 2025, Mohammed Sinwar, the new military leader of Hamas in Gaza, was killed by Israeli military.

In July 2026, Khalil al-Hayya was elected as the new chairman of the Hamas Political Bureau and de facto leader of Hamas, after defeating Khaled Mashal in a narrow margin vote of 35 to 34.

== Structure of organisation and selection ==
Hamas inherited a tripartite organization of social services, religious instruction, and military operations overseen by a Shura Council. It used to have four different roles:

- a security service (Arabic: Jehaz Aman);
- a military division for acquiring weapons and conducting operations (Arabic: Al-Mujahideen al Filastinun);
- a charitable social welfare division (Arabic: Dawah); and
- a media branch (Arabic: A'alam).

Hamas is led both internally, in the West Bank and the Gaza Strip, and externally, by two groups: Kuwaiti organization (Kuwaidi), led by Khaled Mashal, and a Gaza group led by Mousa Abu Marzook, who was exiled first to Damascus and subsequently to Egypt. Following its leader Mashal's decision to demand that Iraq withdraw from Kuwait and defy Yasser Arafat's decision to support Saddam Hussein in the invasion, the Kuwaiti group of Palestinian exiles started to receive substantial money from the Gulf States. Ismail Haniyeh was selected by the Hamas Shura Council in May 2017 to succeed Mashal as the leader of Hamas.

The organization's operational actions are concealed by a veil of secrecy, making its actual structure unclear. Although this has been called into question, Hamas formally claims that the wings are separate and independent. Its wings, it has been suggested, are both distinct and united for political purposes, both foreign and internal. The wide network of informants and the depth of Israeli intelligence surveillance pose challenges to communication between Hamas' military and political wings. Field commanders were granted more discretionary authority over operations and the political direction of the militant wing was weakened following the assassination of Abdel Aziz al-Rantisi.

The Shura Council (Arabic: Majlis al-Shura), with nearly 60 members, most in Gaza, is Hamas' highest consultative body, overseeing the election of the 15-member Political Bureau (Arabic: Al-Maktab al-Siyasi). It is modeled after the Quranic idea of shura, or popular assembly, which Hamas officials claim allows for democracy within an Islamic framework. The General Consultative Council, whose members are chosen from local council groupings, replaced the Shura Council as the organization became increasingly intricate and Israeli pressure mounted.

== Powers and duties ==
The chairman of Hamas Political Bureau was expected to rule over Hamas and all its components. However, there's some exception on its military operations, who have their own military command.

The chairman also led the negotiations for Hamas foreign relations such as negotiations with Israeli government officials for peace process, reconciliation process with Fatah and strengthen relations with other countries in the Middle East.

== Location ==
At Hamas's inception, Mashal was in the Gaza Strip, Palestine before relocating to Amman, Jordan from 1992 to 1997 after the assassination of the group's second chairman. After that, they moved to Damascus, Syria due to conflict with King Hussein of Jordan. He resided there from 1997 until 2012.

Hamas closed its office in Damascus in 2012 after supporting the revolution against Syrian President Bashar al-Assad. Assad repeatedly denounced Hamas for betrayal and hypocrisy. Hamas announced in August 2023 that it intended to reopen its office in Syria.

Hamas's political leadership has resided in Doha, Qatar, since 2012, in an arrangement supported by the United States. In 2024, Hamas explored moving its political headquarters to another country, such as Oman, amidst pressure from the United States and Israel over Qatar's failure to use its leverage with Hamas to facilitate a ceasefire deal to the Gaza war.

The previous chairman, Yahya Sinwar, led Hamas from Gaza Strip, Palestine, since he also led the Hamas government in the Gaza Strip. Sinwar was the first chairman of Hamas Political Bureau to reside in Gaza Strip, doing so while the Gaza war was ongoing. The chairman of Hamas Political Bureau usually lived outside the Gaza Strip, due to the security reasons.

== List of leaders ==
This is the list of leaders of Hamas since its inception in December 1987.

No.	Portrait	Name (Birth–Death)	Term of office			Deputy (Time in office)	Ref.
No.	Portrait	Name (Birth–Death)	Took office	Left office	Time in office	Deputy (Time in office)	Ref.
Chairman of the Hamas Shura Council رئيس مجلس شورى لحركة حماس (Arabic)
1		Ahmed Yassin أحمد ياسين (1936–2004)	10 December 1987	22 March 2004 X	16 years, 103 days	Abdel Aziz al-Rantisi عبد العزيز الرنتيسي (10 December 1987 – 22 March 2004)	
2		Abdel Aziz al-Rantisi عبد العزيز الرنتيسي (1947–2004) (Note: Al-Rantisi was named the new chairman of the Hamas Shura Council and covering duties as de-facto leader of Hamas after the assassination of Ahmed Yassin. However, he did not last long in holding that position when he was assassinated within a month.)	22 March 2004	17 April 2004 X	26 days	Vacant (22 March 2004 – 17 April 2004) (Note: No deputy chairman of the Hamas Shura Council and/or deputy leader of Hamas was appointed at this period of time.)	
Chairman of the Hamas Political Bureau رئيس المكتب السياسي لحركة حماس (Arabic)
3		Khaled Mashal خالد مشعل (born 1956) (Note: Mashal had been chairman of Hamas Political Bureau since 1996, following the imprisonment of his predecessor, Mousa Abu Marzook, in July 1995. The founder of Hamas, Ahmed Yassin, who also served as chairman of Hamas Shura Council, was designated as the leader of Hamas since its founding, to serve until his death. However, after his assassination in March 2004, the deputy chairman of the Shura Council, Abdel Aziz al-Rantisi, was appointed as the chairman of Hamas Shura Council and also the de-facto leader of Hamas. After a month, he was assassinated. Thereafter, Mashal took over the leadership of Hamas, and the position of chairman of the Hamas Political Bureau has been regarded as the overall and de-facto leader of Hamas since April 2004. The position of chairman of Hamas Shura Council was not abolished and still continues to lead the Hamas Shura Council, but not the whole of Hamas anymore, just like its predecessors (Ahmed Yassin and Abdel Aziz al-Rantisi) had designed.)	17 April 2004	6 May 2017	13 years, 19 days	Mousa Abu Marzook موسى أبو مرزوق (17 April 2004 – 4 April 2013)	
3		Khaled Mashal خالد مشعل (born 1956)	17 April 2004	6 May 2017	13 years, 19 days	Ismail Haniyeh إسماعيل هنية (4 April 2013 – 6 May 2017)	
4		Ismail Haniyeh إسماعيل هنية (c. 1962–2024)	6 May 2017 (Note: Haniyeh was considered to have been the de facto leader of Hamas from 2004 to his official appointment.)	31 July 2024 X	7 years, 86 days	Saleh al-Arouri صالح العاروري (9 October 2017 – 2 January 2024) X	
4		Ismail Haniyeh إسماعيل هنية (c. 1962–2024)	6 May 2017	31 July 2024 X	7 years, 86 days	Vacant (2 January 2024 – 6 August 2024) (Note: The post has remained vacant until Khalil al-Hayya selected as the new deputy chairman on 6 August 2024.)	
–		Khaled Mashal خالد مشعل (born 1956); Acting	31 July 2024	6 August 2024	6 days	Vacant (2 January 2024 – 6 August 2024)	
5		Yahya Sinwar يحيى السنوار (1962–2024)	6 August 2024 (Note: Yahya Sinwar was considered to be the de facto leader of the Hamas between 2017 and his appointment.)	16 October 2024 †	71 days	Khalil al-Hayya خليل الحية (6 August 2024 – 16 October 2024)	
–		Temporary committee leadership قيادة اللجنة المؤقتة (Note: Consists of Khaled Mashal, Khalil al-Hayya, Zaher Jabarin, Muhammad Ismail Darwish, and an unnamed senior member of Hamas.); Acting	16 October 2024	20 July 2026	1 year, 277 days	Vacant (16 October 2024 – 20 July 2026)	
6		Khalil al-Hayya خليل الحية (born 1960)	20 July 2026 (Note: Al-Hayya was considered to have been the de facto leader of Hamas from 16 October 2024 until 20 July 2026.)	Incumbent	103 days	Vacant (20 July 2026 – present)	

=== Timeline ===
This is the timeline of leaders of Hamas since its inception in December 1987.

This is the timeline of deputy leaders of Hamas since its inception in December 1987.

== List of chairmen of shura council and political bureau of Hamas ==
=== List of chairmen of shura council ===
This is the incomplete list of chairman of Hamas Shura Council since 1987.

No.	Name	Took office	Left office	Time in office
1.	Ahmed Yassin	10 December 1987	22 March 2004	16 years, 103 days
2.	Abdel Aziz al-Rantisi	22 March 2004	17 April 2004	26 days
3.	Unknown (likely Nizar Awadallah)	17 April 2004	16 March 2021	16 years, 333 days
4.	Osama Mazini	16 March 2021	16 October 2023	2 years, 214 days
5.	Muhammad Ismail Darwish	17 October 2023	Incumbent	3 years, 14 days

=== List of chairmen of political bureau ===
This is the incomplete list of chairman of Hamas Political Bureau since 1992. (Note: This political office was created in 1992.)

No.	Name	Took office	Left office	Time in office
1.	Mousa Abu Marzook	1992	1996	c. 4 years
2.	Khaled Mashal	1996	6 May 2017	c. 21 years
3.	Ismail Haniyeh	6 May 2017	31 July 2024	7 years, 86 days
4.	Yahya Sinwar	6 August 2024	16 October 2024	71 days
5.	Khalil al-Hayya	20 July 2026	Incumbent	103 days

=== List of deputy chairmen of political bureau ===
This is the incomplete list of deputy chairman of Hamas Political Bureau since 1997. (Note: This political office was created in January 1997.)

No.	Name	Took office	Left office	Time in office
1.	Mousa Abu Marzook	15 January 1997	4 April 2013	16 years, 79 days
2.	Ismail Haniyeh	4 April 2013	6 May 2017	4 years, 32 days
3.	Saleh al-Arouri	9 October 2017	2 January 2024	6 years, 85 days
4.	Khalil al-Hayya	6 August 2024	16 October 2024	71 days
5.	Vacant	–		

== List of current members of political bureau of Hamas ==
The Politburo comprises 15 members elected by the Hamas Shura Council every four years. Until his death on 16 October 2024 it was headed by Yahya Sinwar, who replaced Ismail Haniyeh in August 2024 following the assassination of Haniyeh. In addition to the main Politburo, Hamas has regional political bureau elected by four regional shura council, representing the West Bank, Gaza, the diaspora / Palestinian abroad, and Israeli prisoners.

=== List of current members of main political bureau ===
This is the current list of the main political bureau of Hamas. All these members were elected since May 2017.

- ~~Ismail Haniyeh~~ X (Chairman)
- ~~Yahya Sinwar~~ † (Chairman) (Note: After the assassination of Haniyeh in July 2024.)
- ~~Saleh al-Arouri~~ X (Deputy chairman)
- Khalil al-Hayya (~~Deputy chairman~~; (Note: After the assassination of al-Arouri in January 2024.) Chairman)
- Nizar Awadallah
- Husam Badran
- ~~Salah al-Bardawil~~ X
- Fathi Hamad
- Zaher Jabarin
- Mousa Abu Marzook
- Khaled Mashal
- Haroun Abu Muhammad
- Mohammad Nazzal
- Abu Khalil al-Quds
- Izzat al-Risheq
- Abu al-Abed Salah
- Maher Jawad Salah
- ~~Sameh al-Siraj~~ X

=== List of current members of political bureau in the Gaza Strip ===
This is the current list of the Hamas political bureau in the Gaza Strip. All these members were elected since March 2021.

- ~~Yahya Sinwar~~ † (Chairman)
- ~~Mohammed Sinwar~~ † (Chairman) (Note: After the killing of Sinwar in October 2024.)
- Khalil al-Hayya (Deputy Chairman) (Note: He is currently based in Doha, Qatar as of July 2025.)
- Mahmoud al-Zahar (Note: He is currently based in Turkey as of 2025.)
- ~~Rawhi Mushtaha~~ X
- ~~Sameh al-Siraj~~ X
- ~~Marwan Issa~~ X
- ~~Jamila al-Shanti~~ X
- Fatima Sharab
- Ghazi Hamad
- ~~Ismail Barhoum~~ X
- Suheil al-Hindi
- ~~Zakaria Abu Maamar~~ X
- ~~Jawad Abu Shamala~~ X
- Kamal Abu Awan
- ~~Essam al-Da'alis~~ X

=== List of current members of political bureau in the West Bank ===
List of the political bureau of Hamas in the West Bank elected since May 2017.

- ~~Saleh al-Arouri~~ X (Chairman)
- Zaher Jabarin (~~Deputy chairman~~; Chairman)
- ~~Azzam al-Aqra~~ X
- ~~Samir Fandi~~ X
- ~~Khalil al-Kharraz~~ X

=== List of current members of political bureau in the Diaspora / Palestinian Abroad ===
This is the current list of the political bureau of Hamas in the Diaspora / Palestinian Abroad. All these members was elected since May 2017.

- Khaled Mashal (Chairman)

=== List of current members of political bureau in Israeli prisons ===
This is the current list of the political bureau of Hamas in Israeli prisons. All these members was elected since May 2017.

- Salameh Katawi (Chairman)

== List of military leaders in the Gaza Strip ==
Commanders of the Izz al-Din al-Qassam Brigades
No.	Name	Took office	Left office	Cause of death
1.	Saleh al-Arouri	June–August 1991	1993	Assassinated by airstrike in 2024
2.	Emad Akel	1993	24 November 1993	Assassinated by IDF
3.	Yahya Ayyash	November–December 1993	5 January 1996	Assassinated by a boobytrapped cell phone
4.	Adel Awadallah	January–March 1996	10 September 1998	Assassinated by Yamam
5.	Salah Shehade	September–December 1998	22 July 2002	Assassinated by airstrike
6.	Mohammed Deif	July–September 2002	13 July 2024	Assassinated by airstrike
7.	Mohammed Sinwar	4 November 2024	13 May 2025	Assassinated by airstrike
8.	Izz al-Din al-Haddad	1 June 2025 (Note: Widely suspected to be the de facto commander, although unconfirmed by Hamas or al-Haddad, either directly or indirectly.)	15 May 2026	Assassinated by airstrike
9.	Mohammed Odeh	15 May 2026	26 May 2026	Assassinated by airstrike

== See also ==
- Axis of Resistance
- Palestinian Joint Operations Room
- Hamas most wanted playing cards
