= Muhammad Ismail Darwish =

Palestinian politician

Muhammad Ismail Darwish محمد إسماعيل درويش
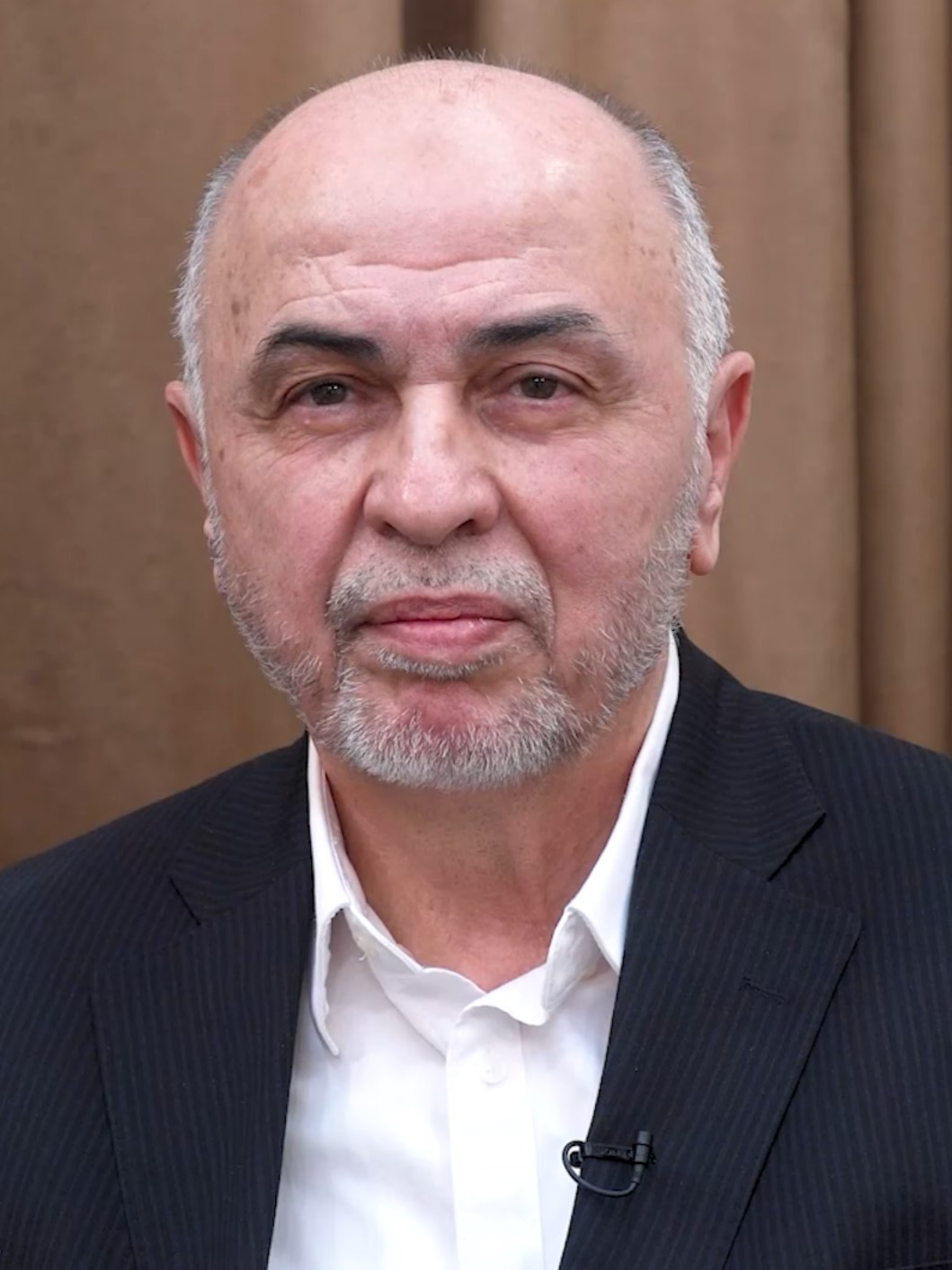
- Darwish in 2025

Chairman of the Hamas Shura Council
- Incumbent
- Assumed office 17 October 2023
- Preceded by: Osama Mazini

Chairman of the Hamas Political Bureau
- Acting
- In office 16 October 2024 – 20 July 2026 Serving with Khaled Mashal, Khalil al-Hayya, Zaher Jabarin, and Nizar Awadallah
- Preceded by: Yahya Sinwar
- Succeeded by: Khalil al-Hayya

Personal details
- Born: Muhammad Ismail Darwish Palestinian refugee camp, Lebanon
- Party: Hamas

Muhammad Ismail Darwish (Arabic: محمد إسماعيل درويش, romanized: Muḥammad ʾIsmāʿīl Darwīsh), also known as Abu Omar Hassan (Arabic: أبو عمر حسن, romanized: ʾAbū ʿUmar Ḥasan), is a Lebanese-born Palestinian politician who has served as the chairman of the Hamas Shura Council since October 2023, succeeding Osama Mazini, after his death on 16 October 2023 by an Israeli strike.

== Early life ==
Muhammad Ismail Darwish was born in a Palestinian refugee camp in Lebanon.

== Career ==
Darwish joined Hamas and built the organization's finances, including transferring money from Iran, as well as managing investments around the world.

He announced in March 2025 Hamas's willingness to abstain from participating in the governance of post-war Gaza, calling for a national unity government or a non-partisan technocratic body to rule the territory.

== Assassination attempt ==
Darwish was at the Hamas Headquarters in Doha, Qatar during an airstrike on 9 September 2025. Hamas stated that its entire leadership survived the attack.

== Personal life ==
He lives in Qatar.
