= Saleh al-Arouri =

Hamas deputy leader (1966–2024)

- صالح العاروري
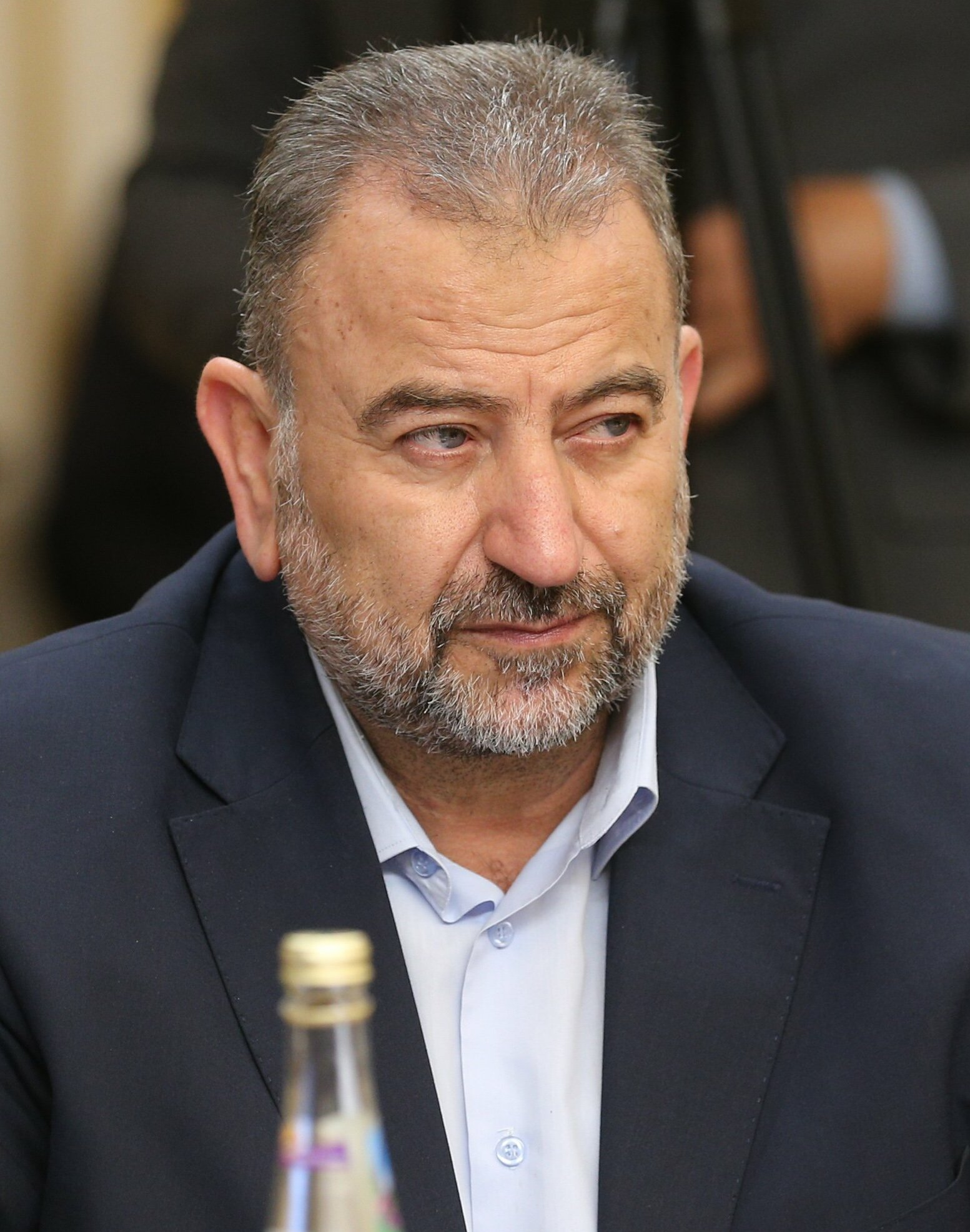
- Al-Arouri in 2022

3rd Deputy Chairman of the Hamas Political Bureau
- In office 9 October 2017 – 2 January 2024
- Chairman: Ismail Haniyeh
- Preceded by: Ismail Haniyeh
- Succeeded by: Khalil al-Hayya

1st Commander of the Izz al-Din al-Qassam Brigades
- In office June–August 1991 – 1993
- Preceded by: Position established
- Succeeded by: Emad Akel

Personal details
- Born: 19 August 1966 'Arura, Jordanian West Bank
- Died: 2 January 2024 (aged 57) Dahieh, Lebanon
- Cause of death: Assassination by drone strike
- Citizenship: Jordan (until 1988); Lebanon (since 1988)
- Party: Hamas
- Children: 2
- Education: Hebron University (BA)
- Profession: Military commander
- Known for: Deputy chairman of the Hamas Political Bureau and founding commander of Ezzedeen Al-Qassam Brigades

Saleh Muhammad Sulayman al-Arouri (Arabic: صالح محمد سليمان العاروري, romanized: Ṣāliḥ Muḥammad Sulaimān al-ʿĀrūrī; 19 August 1966 – 2 January 2024), also transliterated as Salah al-Arouri or Salih al-Aruri, was a Palestinian politician and senior leader of Hamas who served as deputy chairman of the Hamas Political Bureau from October 2017 until his assassination in January 2024. He was a founding commander of Hamas' military wing, the Ezzedeen Al-Qassam Brigades, and later served as Hamas' military commander of the West Bank, although he lived in Lebanon at the time of his assassination.

Al-Arouri was born in 'Arura near Ramallah in the West Bank in 1966. He enrolled at Hebron University to study Islamic Sharia in 1985, during which he was elected head of the Islamic faction at the university, and was recruited to Hamas in 1987 during the First Intifada. Starting in 1990, he was imprisoned by Israel multiple times for his Hamas activities, starting with administrative detention, and served his longest sentence for 15 years before his release in 2007. He was then deported to Syria. He later moved to Turkey and finally settled in Lebanon in 2015.

He was described as "a capable, charismatic, suspicious, and shrewd operator, with excellent connections". He also served as a recruiter, and was actively involved in raising and transferring funds on behalf of Hamas. Al-Arouri was considered one of the architects of the October 7 attack on Israel, and was also known for his role in expanding Hamas' activities in the West Bank.

The U.S., which designated him as a terrorist in 2015, had also put a $5 million bounty on his head. He was assassinated in 2024 during the Gaza war by an Israeli strike. Al-Arouri was succeeded by Zaher Jabarin as Hamas's leader in the West Bank.

== Early life ==
Al-Arouri was born on 19 August 1966 in 'Arura, Ramallah in the West Bank. In 1985, he enrolled at Hebron University to study Islamic Sharia. He was elected head of the Islamic faction at the university, where he established ties to Kutla Islamiya (Islamic Blocs), Hamas' youth wing on campus.

== Joining Hamas ==
Al-Arouri had joined Hamas during the First Intifada against the Israeli occupation in 1987. Through his connection to Kutla Islamiya, al-Arouri met Muin Shahib, a Bir University-based Hamas operative who recruited al-Arouri to the ranks of Hamas and entrusted him with funding of an infrastructure for Hamas' military apparatus in Hebron. With Zaher Jabarin, al-Arouri helped to found the Al-Qassam Brigades, Hamas's military wing, leading its expansion into the northern West Bank.

== Imprisonment ==
After al-Arouri was briefly imprisoned by Israel, he was directed by Hamas to recruit a squad in Hebron that acquired weapons in 1990, thought to have been used in the later killing of an Israeli soldier. He spent six months in prison. He was arrested again shortly after. Initially held on administrative detention, he spent 15 years in prison for his leadership role in Hamas.

In 2007, al-Arouri was arrested again by the Israeli authorities and released in March 2010, probably for his decisive role in the release of Israeli soldier Gilad Shalit who was captured by Hamas in 2006.

== Release ==
When he was released from prison in Israel in 2007, al-Arouri told interviewers that he abjured terrorist attacks, asserting that Hamas is "harmed if we target civilians." He was exiled by Israel shortly after his release from prison and he moved to Damascus, Syria, where he joined Hamas' political bureau headed by Khaled Meshaal. When Khaled Meshal left Damascus at the inception of the Syrian Civil War, Arouri relocated to Istanbul, Turkey, where he established his own bureau.

Up until 2015, al-Arouri lived in Turkey; in December 2015, it was reported that he had left Turkey for Lebanon. Ynet News reported that al-Arouri's departure was part of the reconciliation efforts between Turkey and Israel, and had been discussed during the meeting held in early December between Turkish President Tayyip Erdoğan, Turkish Prime Minister Ahmet Davutoğlu, and Hamas' political leader Khaled Meshal.

== Leadership and strategy ==
Al-Arouri was usually portrayed as a pragmatic leader, in contrast with Hamas leadership's hardline policy. According to Matthew Levitt of the think tank Washington Institute for Near East Policy, al-Arouri "has been a key figure behind Hamas' efforts to rejuvenate the group's terrorist networks in the West Bank."

From Istanbul, al-Arouri allegedly operated independently from the rest of the organization, thereby fostering existing leadership issues in Hamas, an organization multi-headed by design. Hamas' Turkey branch is generally described to be making decisions without taking into account the movement as a whole and without involving the Hamas leadership. Udi Levy, who has worked for over 30 years with Israeli intelligence, described al-Arouri as "Iran's man inside Hamas".

Some of Al Qassam Brigades' activities aimed at establishing a Hamas cell in Hebron specialized in kidnapping Israeli soldiers, which Hamas believes is one of the most effective strategies to secure the release of its affiliates. Al Qassam Brigades and the Hamas cell in Hebron are run from remote locations, and have often benefited from help coming from outside the Israeli territories. This has been evident since 2013, when Israel Defense Forces (IDF) and the Israel Security Agency (Shin Bet) arrested 20 terrorists affiliated with Hamas that had been assisted by Hamas operatives abroad with "guidance and funding."

Al-Arouri said in a conference in Turkey on 20 August 2014 that Hamas was responsible for the 2014 kidnapping and murder of Israeli teenagers. However, his claim was doubted by experts. The Israeli defense establishment thinks al-Arouri was boasting and was unconnected to the kidnapping.

Al-Arouri was regarded as the orchestrator of a series of incidents of terrorism against Israelis in 2015, including the 2015 Shvut Rachel shooting and the shooting of Danny Gonen. His focus was on building Hamas military capacity in the West Bank, by smuggling in weapons and establishing sleeper cells. In September 2015, al-Arouri was placed on the U.S. list of terrorists.

During September 2023, al-Arouri met with Hezbollah leader Hassan Nasrallah, PIJ secretary-general Ziyad al-Nakhalah, and PFLP deputy secretary-general Jamil Mezher in Lebanon. Israeli media framed the meetings as indicative of an upcoming escalation in the Gaza Strip or West Bank.

Al-Arouri had been living in Lebanon when the Gaza war broke out. In the immediate aftermath of the October 7 attack on Israel, Arouri said the attack was a retaliation against Israel for the "crimes of occupation", adding that Hamas captured enough Israeli soldiers to secure a prisoner exchange with Israel. The Wall Street Journal alleged that Arouri was behind the attack. Arouri played a key role in the negotiations that lead to the release of 105 Israel civilian hostages from Gaza in November 2023.

=== Financial activities ===
In September 2015, the U.S. Treasury sanctioned al-Arouri for being "responsible… for money transfers for Hamas." The U.S. Treasury claimed that al-Arouri directed and oversaw "the distribution of Hamas finances" and portrayed him as "a key financier and financial facilitator for Hamas military cells planning attacks and fomenting unrest."

In 2011, al-Arouri facilitated fund transfers to the families of convicted terrorists and deceased Hamas officers in coordination with Saudi Arabia-based Hamas financial officer Mahir Salah. U.S. authorities also posited that in 2014, al-Arouri was leading a Hamas initiative that would have destabilized the Palestinian Authority and would have prepared a Hamas' takeover. Moreover, Al Arouri allegedly "financed and directed a Hamas cell in the West Bank that sought to instigate clashes between Israeli and Palestinian forces."

More generally, in 2014, al-Arouri was in charge of several Hamas military cells both in the West Bank and in Jordan. The U.S. Treasury claimed that by then, he had "facilitated the transfer of hundreds of thousands of dollars to Hamas, including to the Izzedine al-Qassam Brigades, the military wing of Hamas, for the purchase of arms and storage facilities for weapons." Al-Arouri succeeded in establishing solid ties between the West Bank cells and Hamas's U.S.-based financiers. In this connection, terror finance expert Matthew Levitt claimed that al-Arouri "played a critical intermediary role between otherwise compartmented elements of Hamas's external leadership and on-the-ground operatives."

=== Diplomatic activities ===
Al-Arouri often travelled and attended official meetings as part of Hamas delegations. In March 2012, he met with Turkish Prime Minister Recep Tayyip Erdoğan. In October 2012, he attended the visit of the Emir of Qatar to the Gaza Strip.

== Personal life ==
During al-Arouri's 15-year imprisonment by Israel, he was engaged to a woman who waited 12 years for him, and he quickly married her after his release in 2007. He was quoted by a Hamas statement that: "Yes, my marriage to my fiancee and building a family is the most important thing now especially when my fiancee waited for me for 12 years." It was reported that he had a daughter in 2014. He also had a younger sister named Dalal, who following his death was arrested by Israeli authorities for allegedly helping to fund his terroristic activities.

== Later life and assassination ==
At the time of his death in 2024, al-Arouri was living in Lebanon. His home in 'Arura in the Israeli-occupied West Bank was destroyed by Israeli forces during the Gaza war in October 2023.

On 2 January 2024, al-Arouri, 57, was assassinated in the Dahieh neighborhood of Beirut by an Israeli strike. The attack was suspected to be the work of Israel, Hamas' chief opponent, but the country did not officially acknowledge its involvement until May 2025 when al-Arouri's name and photo was included in a publicity photo of Hamas leaders that were killed by Israel. The assassination, which also killed six other individuals, occurred one day before Hezbollah commemorated the anniversary of the assassination of senior Iranian military commander Qasem Soleimani.

After al-Arouri's death, Zaher Jabarin succeeded him as Hamas's leader in the West Bank.
