= Assassination of Saleh al-Arouri =

2024 assassination in Beirut, Lebanon

- Part of the Gaza war
- Assassination of Saleh al-Arouri (Beirut) Assassination of Saleh al-Arouri (Lebanon) Assassination of Saleh al-Arouri (Eastern Mediterranean)
- Date: 2 January 2024; 2 years ago
- Location: Dahieh, Lebanon; 33.857331°N 35.514419°E
- Type: Drone attack or airstrike
- Target: Saleh al-Arouri
- Perpetrator: Israel
- Deaths: 7

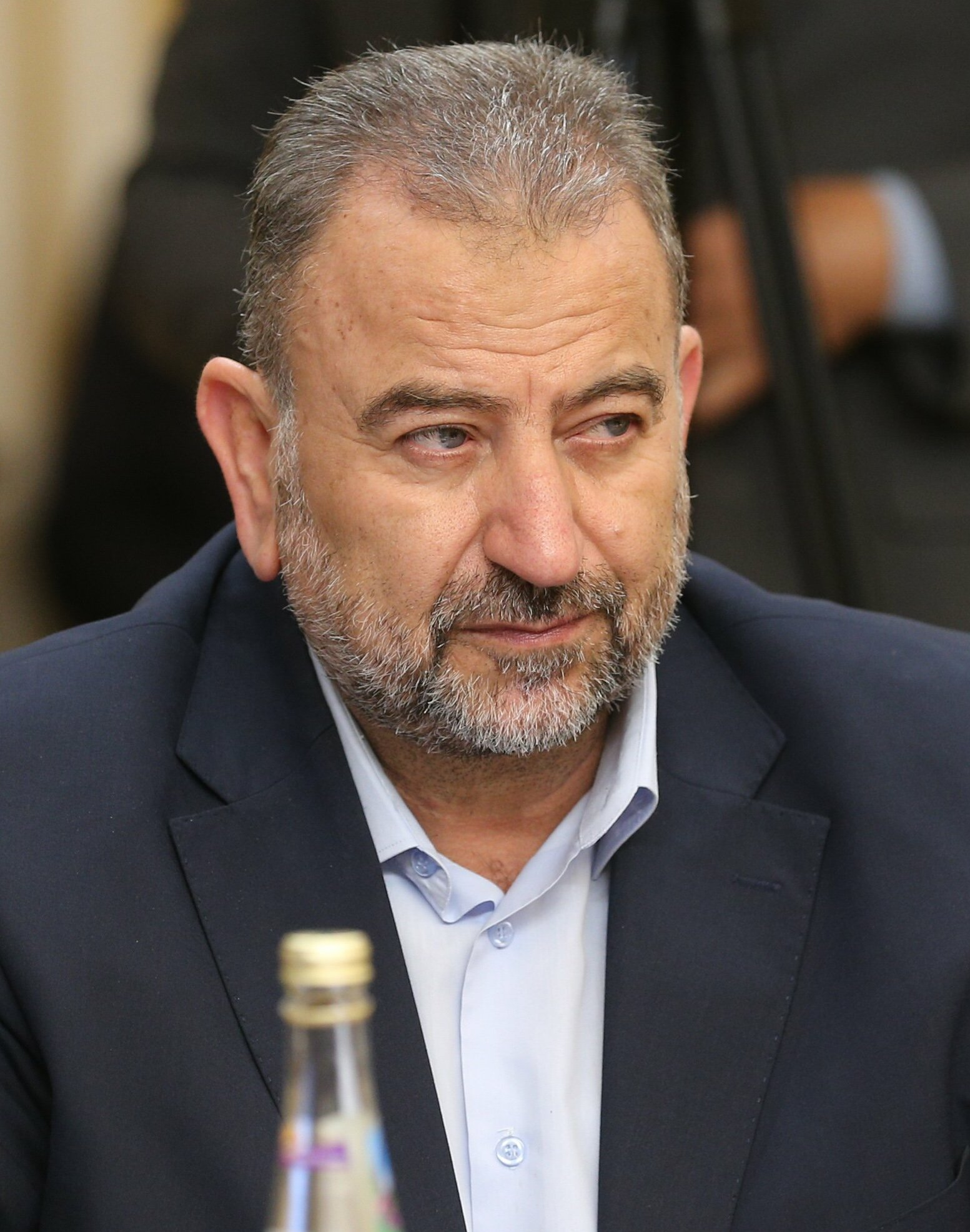
Al-Arouri in 2022

On 2 January 2024, Saleh al-Arouri, the deputy leader of Hamas, was killed in an Israeli strike on an office in the Dahieh suburbs of Beirut, Lebanon. The strike also killed six other individuals, including additional high-ranking Hamas militants.

Saleh al-Arouri was the deputy leader of the Hamas political bureau and one of the architects of the October 7 attacks. He was also responsible for the expansion of Hamas' activities in the Israeli-occupied West Bank, including attacks on Israelis. This attack was widely believed to have been carried out by Israel, Hamas' main adversary. However, Israel did not confirm its involvement in this incident until May 2025 when al-Arouri's name and photo was included in a publicity photo of Hamas leaders that were killed by Israel.

The assassination occurred a day before Hezbollah commemorated the fourth anniversary of the assassination (in Hezbollah's view, martyrdom) of senior Iranian IRGC military commander Qasem Soleimani.

== Background ==
On 8 October 2023, the Lebanese militant group Hezbollah fired guided rockets and artillery shells at Israeli positions in the disputed Shebaa Farms one day into the Gaza war. Israel retaliated by launching drone strikes and artillery shells at Hezbollah positions near Lebanon's boundary with the Israeli-occupied Golan Heights. The outbreak of the conflict had followed Hezbollah's declaration of support and praise for the Hamas attack on Israel, which took place on 7 October. Hamas in Lebanon and the Palestine Islamic Jihad (PIJ) have since joined the fighting with Hezbollah. Since 1969, Palestinian militia groups have held base in Lebanon after being ousted from Jordan.

Up until 2015, Arouri lived in Turkey; in December 2015, it was reported that he had left Turkey for Lebanon. In 2015, the United States had placed a $5 million bounty on Saleh al-Arouri and designated him as a Specially Designated Global Terrorist (SDGT).

=== Lead-up ===
Allied groups of Hamas specifically warned the group against using the office after they suspected that its location had become exposed to Israeli intelligence. Hezbollah had written letters to Hamas. Numerous members brought phones with them which placed them at further risk of surveillance and the office was also equipped with at least one computer and had Wi-Fi connection. Lebanese security officials suspect that a stealth plane fired precision-guided missiles into the office.

A security official informed The National of Abu Dhabi: "The radars that we have are civil radars, we don't have military radar capability that can pick up on the presence of stealth planes".

== Attack ==
According to CCTV footage published by MTV Lebanon, the attack took place around 17:41 (local time) in Dahieh, a residential suburban neighborhood of Beirut. Cell phone footage show at least one car engulfed in flames in front of a damaged residential building as dozens gather in the area just after the strike. Early reports said that four Hamas members were killed but increased to six which included a possible civilian. The Hamas-affiliated Al-Aqsa TV announced that the Hamas Operations Chief in Lebanon, Samir Fendi, and Azzam al-Aqra were among those killed in the strike alongside al-Arouri.

Ismail Haniyeh later identified three additional Hamas members who were killed. He announced the deaths of Hamas members Mahmoud Zaki Shahin, Mohammad Bashasha, Mohammad al-Rayes, and Mohammad Hamoud.

Two senior U.S. officials confirmed that Israel was responsible for the strike.

=== Deaths ===
List of those killed that were eventually announced by Hamas.

Name	Role	Ref
Saleh al-Arouri	Deputy Chairman of the Political Bureau of Hamas	
Samir Fendi	Izz al-Din al-Qassam Brigades (EQB) commanders	
Azzam Al-Aqra	Izz al-Din al-Qassam Brigades (EQB) commanders	
Muhammad Al-Rayes	Other militants and security officials	
Muhammad Bashasha	Other militants and security officials	
Ahmed Hammoud	Other militants and security officials	
Mahmoud Zaki Shahin	Other militants and security officials	

== Aftermath ==
Al-Arouri was the highest ranking Hamas leader killed since the beginning of the war until the assassination of Ismail Haniyeh. In his second speech since the beginning of the war, Secretary-General Hassan Nasrallah said that Hezbollah is not afraid of an all-out war with Israel. He described the attack as a "major and dangerous crime" that "will not go unanswered and unpunished". Hezbollah announced that it carried out nine attacks targeting Israeli positions. On the same day, an Israeli airstrike in Naqoura killed local Hezbollah commander Hussein Yazbek and three of his bodyguards, and injured nine other Hezbollah operatives.

=== Reactions ===
==== Governments ====
- The Lebanese Prime Minister Najib Mikati described the assassination as a "new Israeli crime" designed at "dragging Lebanon into a new phase of confrontation".
- The spokesperson for Iran's foreign ministry condemned the assassination, asserting that Israel and its supporters would bear responsibility for the consequences of this "new adventure".
  - Iran warned the United States that it must prepare to face the consequences for the attack.
  - Iranian President Ebrahim Raisi stated the assassination was a crime.
- The Israeli government did not immediately take responsibility for the strike that killed al-Arouri. Mark Regev, an adviser to the Israeli Prime Minister, said in an interview that Israel:
  "Has not taken responsibility for this attack. But whoever did it, it must be clear – this was not an attack on the Lebanese state ... Whoever did this did a surgical strike against the Hamas leadership".
  - MK Danny Danon posted on social media, writing, "I congratulate the IDF, Shin Bet, the Mossad and the security forces for killing senior Hamas official Saleh al-Arouri in Beirut."
- French President Emmanuel Macron urged Israel to "avoid any escalatory attitude, particularly in Lebanon" in a call with Israel's war cabinet member Benny Gantz.

==== Groups and organizations ====
- After the attack, UN spokeswoman Florencia Soto Nino said that:
  "The Secretary-General (António Guterres) urges all parties to exercise maximum restraint and take urgent steps to deescalate tensions in the region".
- Hamas member Izzat al-Risheq stated that al-Arouri was killed in a "cowardly assassination" by Israel, and added that "It proves once again the abject failure of this enemy to achieve any of its aggressive goals in the Gaza Strip".
- The Palestinian Islamic Jihad (PIJ) Secretary-General Ziad al-Nakhalah mourned Arouri, calling him a leader who contributed to the Palestinian resistance in the Gaza Strip and the West Bank.
- The Palestinian National and Islamic Forces commemorated Arouri's death and called for "revolutionary action" in the West Bank, Jerusalem, and Israel.
- Kata'ib Sayyid al-Shuhada General-Secretariat compared Israel's killing of Arouri to the U.S. killing of Qasem Soleimani and Abu Mahdi al-Muhandis and claimed that the attack "violated Lebanese sovereignty".
- The Chairman of the Popular Mobilization Forces (PMF), Falih al-Fayyadh warned that the "murderous criminals" who killed Arouri will pay for their actions.
- In an official statement, the Islamic Group condemned the attack and stressed: "that the assassination will not go unpunished".

=== Demonstrations ===
Immediately after the conformation of al-Arouri's death, numerous demonstrations took place in Lebanese cities. Protests were held at refugee camps including the Beddawi refugee camp in Tripoli. This included protests in the city of Ramallah, near Arouri's hometown, where demonstrators chanted: "We will follow your footsteps", and "revenge, revenge, Qassam!"

== See also ==
- Killing of Ahmed Yassin
- Assassination of Abdel Aziz al-Rantisi
- Assassination of Ismail Haniyeh
- Assassination of Hassan Nasrallah
- Hamas in Lebanon
- United Nations Security Council Resolution 1701
- List of assassinations in Lebanon
- Outline of the Gaza war
- Timeline of the Gaza war (24 November 2023 – 11 January 2024)
- Timeline of the Israeli–Palestinian conflict in 2024
