= Killing of Yahya Sinwar =

2024 killing of Hamas leader

- Part of the Gaza war and Rafah offensive
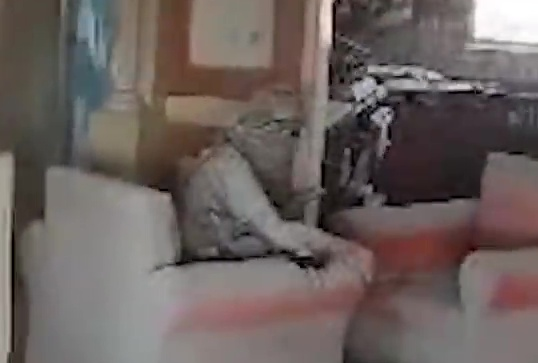
- Sinwar, wounded, staring at an Israeli drone, with his face covered in a keffiyeh, shortly before his death
- Operational scope: Routine patrol of an area by the Israel Defense Forces' 828th Bislamach Brigade, leading to a shootout
- Type: Shootout
- Location: Tel al-Sultan, Rafah, Gaza Strip; 31°18′19.9″N 34°14′48.4″E
- Objective: Killing of suspected militants encountered while patrolling (Note: Yahya Sinwar as a named target was not the objective—his identity was discovered only later.)
- Date: 16 October 2024
- Casualties: 3 Hamas militants killed (including Yahya Sinwar); 1 IDF soldier severely injured
- Location within the Gaza Strip

On 16 October 2024, during their operations in the Gaza war, Israel Defense Forces (IDF) troops killed Hamas leader Yahya Sinwar. His killing was the result of a routine patrol and a chance encounter in the southern Gazan city of Rafah. He had been one of Israel's most wanted men after the October 7 attacks.

In the lead-up to the shootout, members of the 828th Bislamach Brigade reported activity they deemed suspicious and received orders to engage. When their drone spotted three militants leaving a building, the soldiers fired upon them, not knowing that Sinwar was among them. The militants scattered, with Sinwar entering a nearby building alone. A firefight ensued, in which an IDF soldier was severely injured. An IDF tank fired at Sinwar's location and troops advanced into the building, but they pulled back after he threw grenades at them. IDF then sent the drone to survey the interior, detecting the injured Sinwar, his identity still unknown to engaging troops. After entering again the following day, they found Sinwar's body in the wrecked building and suspected it could be his, based on resemblance. They cut a finger from the body and sent it to Israel for identification purposes; later in the day, the body was dispatched as well.

Sinwar's body was identified through dental records and DNA testing, and his death was confirmed by Israeli officials soon afterward. An Israeli pathologist reported that the body showed various injuries from different causes, and that Sinwar died from being shot to the head, causing severe traumatic brain injury. Hamas also acknowledged his death on 18 October. In the subsequently released footage made by the Israeli drone, seen by many, Sinwar is seen wounded as he throws a stick at the drone. Some in Israel characterized the imagery as showing defeat, while Sinwar's supporters interpreted his conduct as emblematic of defiance. Critics questioned Israel's choice to release the footage in the first place, based on concerns that it contributes to Sinwar's post-mortem heroization.

Israeli prime minister Benjamin Netanyahu said the killing of Sinwar "settled the score", but warned the war would continue with full force until Israel's hostages were returned. U.S. president Joe Biden stated "This is a good day for Israel, for the United States, and for the world", comparing Sinwar's death to the killing of Osama bin Laden and emphasizing that it presents an opportunity for a "day after" in Gaza without Hamas. In Hamas's statement confirming Sinwar's death, Basem Naim said: "Hamas becomes stronger and more popular with each elimination of its leaders. It hurts to lose people, especially unique leaders like Yahya Sinwar, but we are sure we will win in the end."

== Background ==
In September 2015, Yahya Sinwar was designated a terrorist by the United States government. Sinwar had served as Hamas leader in the Gaza Strip since February 2017. His leadership was characterized by a focus on military strengthening and alliances with Iran and Hezbollah. Committed to the destruction of Israel, he is thought to be, alongside Mohammed Deif, one of the main architects of the October 7 attacks in 2023. The group, under his leadership, had been planning this assault for two years prior to its execution. By launching the attack, Sinwar initiated the Gaza war—one of the deadliest wars in the Israeli–Palestinian conflict— which Sinwar considered to have been a necessary sacrifice to achieve Hamas's political objectives. He also drew Iran and other members of the Axis of Resistance, including Hezbollah—whose capabilities have significantly diminished due to Israeli actions—along with the Houthi movement and Iraqi militias, into direct conflict with Israel.

In February 2024, a video was published of Sinwar moving in a tunnel with his family. The International Criminal Court (ICC) was scheduled to issue a war crimes indictment against Sinwar, as announced in May. Sinwar was chosen as head of the movement's political bureau on 6 August 2024 after the assassination of Ismail Haniyeh. The following month, the U.S. Department of Justice unsealed the criminal indictment it had filed against Sinwar.

On multiple occasions throughout the war, residents of Gaza criticized Hamas, Sinwar, and economic conditions both through demonstrations and with online media. Prior to his death, Sinwar stated in his speeches that he would rather be killed by Israel than die by a heart attack or in a car accident. In one instance, he said that "the best gift the enemy and the occupation can offer me is to assassinate me and that I go as a martyr at their hands".

The Israeli security establishment was reportedly aware for months that Sinwar was hiding in the Tel al-Sultan neighborhood of Rafah, although his precise location remained unknown. On 31 August, six hostages were killed near the building that Sinwar was later killed in. He had reportedly been in the same tunnel with them. The United States said that it assisted in gathering intelligence that aided the IDF in narrowing down its search for Sinwar but denied any involvement in the operation that killed him.

== Killing ==
External videos
- Netanyahu announcing Sinwar's death
- In English
- In Hebrew

On 17 October 2024, the Israel Defense Forces (IDF) reported a "high likelihood" that Sinwar was killed in Rafah. The IDF had engaged in a firefight with a group of Hamas militants the previous day, killing three operatives. The shootout was carried out by conscript soldiers from Bislamach Brigade who did not know who they were fighting, according to Kan. There were no hostages nearby. According to an IDF spokesperson, Sinwar had been in a damaged building before a tank fired at the structure. However, a later pathologist report established the cause of death as a gunshot wound to the head. The gunshot to the head contradicted the IDF, who reported combat ended after a tank shell fired at the building.

The IDF also stated that it had killed Sinwar's bodyguard, Mahmoud Hamdan, after previously incorrectly claiming to have assassinated him on 10 September 2024. Hamas also later confirmed Hamdan's death.

=== Order of events ===
On 16 October 2024, at approximately 10:00 am, IDF troops noticed a suspicious figure entering and exiting a building in their vicinity, after which an order was given to engage. At 3:00 pm an IDF drone detected three militants exiting the building, two covered in blankets and clearing the path for a third. The soldiers opened fire and the group scattered, two entering one building and the third, later proven to be Sinwar, entering another building and climbing to the second floor. An IDF soldier was severely injured in the firefight that ensued. A tank fired a shell at Sinwar's location, and infantry soldiers began to sweep the building. Sinwar lobbed two grenades at them; one exploded and one did not. The troops then pulled back and sent in a drone which detected an injured figure with a covered face attempting to knock the drone out of the air with a stick. At the time, it was not known that the masked man was Sinwar. After the drone broke contact, an additional tank shell and MATADOR rocket were fired at the building, and it was also raked with machine gun fire.

Following the incident, troops discovered a body that had a striking resemblance to Sinwar, dressed in military fatigues, with a grenade and a gun, while assessing the collapsed building where the exchange occurred. Additional items found on his person included 40,000 shekels (NIS) in cash, a lighter and a passport unrelated to him, which belonged to a UNRWA teacher. It is reported that the three bodies were found carrying cash, weapons and fake IDs.

Following this, Israeli officials informed the security cabinet of Sinwar's likely death. IDF forces were not specifically targeting Sinwar during the operation, and they did not anticipate his presence in the area.

Initial reports indicated that DNA, dental, and fingerprint tests would be conducted for formal identification, as the IDF holds Sinwar's records from his time in prison. Photos circulated on social media purportedly showing the body believed to be Sinwar with wounds to the head and a leg. According to The New York Times, the photos matched archival footage of Sinwar including crooked teeth and distinctive moles.

Israeli newspaper Yedioth Ahronoth, which also published photographs of the body, confirmed that Israel's forensic police unit made a full match with Sinwar's dental records. Israel Police said in a statement that the body matched Sinwar's dental records and fingerprints. The identification was further confirmed by DNA testing. Hamas also confirmed his death on 18 October. An autopsy by Chen Kugel, chief forensic pathologist at Israel's National Center of Forensic Medicine, showed the cause of death was a shot to Sinwar's head. According to Kugel, Sinwar sustained numerous injuries. He found that he had an injury to the right forearm from a tank shell or missile, another injury to the left leg and thigh from fallen masonry, and multiple shrapnel wounds across his body, though only the shrapnel wounds to his chest caused severe damage. The cause of death was determined by Kugel to be severe traumatic brain injury from a gunshot wound to the head.

== Analysis ==
The Associated Press described Sinwar's death as a "dramatic turning point" in the war, stating that the killing "decapitates the Palestinian militant group that was already reeling from months of assassinations up and down its ranks", and called it "a potent symbolic achievement for Israel in its battle to destroy Hamas."

The CEO of the Israel Policy Forum, David Halperin, and the president of J Street, Jeremy Ben Ami, predicted that Sinwar's killing was an opportunity to return the hostages and de-escalate the situation. Gershon Baskin, who helped negotiate the 2011 Shalit deal, said a full hostage deal could take 3–4 days.

Brian Carter of the Institute for the Study of War wrote that Sinwar's death will not change the course of the war, noting that Hamas still has capable commanders. Further, he stated that the release of hostages was unlikely, as Hamas wishes to use them to pressure Israel into a full withdrawal from Gaza, a move that he calls entirely unacceptable, as it would enable Hamas to rebuild its military capabilities.

The Economist reported that following the death of Yahya Sinwar, Hamas faces internal struggles regarding its power dynamics and ideological direction. While Hamas retains military forces in Gaza, "their exhaustion and weakness might allow other power hubs to wrest power away from Gaza." Israel is expected to demand Hamas's surrender, seeking a dissolution of its governance in Gaza rather than the concessions that Sinwar previously rejected. The report highlighted the ideological struggle within the group, identifying potential leaders such as Khalil al-Hayya, who advocates for ties with Iran, and former leader Khaled Mashal, who may pursue integration with the PLO. The outcomes of these struggles, according to the report, will significantly impact Hamas's future, either leaning toward a path of moderation or increased Iranian-backed extremism.

Julian Borger, writing inThe Guardian, said that Sinwar's death while participating in ground battles alongside a small group of militants ran counter to the Israeli defense establishment's assumptions that he would be hiding underground, surrounded by hostages. There were no hostages in Sinwar's vicinity at the time of his death, and no civilian casualties were reported.

== Visuals of Sinwar's death ==
Wounded Yahya Sinwar stares at a drone sent to inspect the building after an armed clash and tosses a stick at it.

Following Sinwar's death, the IDF released images and drone footage depicting him wounded and slumped in a chair, aiming to portray him as a fugitive. In these visuals, he appeared alone and injured, with some Israeli commentators describing his death as a "coward's end" and likening him to "a rat out of his hole."

In contrast, Sinwar's supporters used the same imagery to portray him as a martyr, framing his final actions as an act of defiance. They emphasized his combat fatigues and keffiyeh, asserting that he fought bravely until the end. One supporter remarked that the footage "shows not defeat but defiance", as Sinwar attempted to throw a stick at the drone with his one good arm. The visuals quickly circulated widely in militant areas like Jenin, transforming into memes that celebrated Sinwar's legacy. Iran's mission to the United Nations contrasted Sinwar's final actions with those of Iraqi dictator Saddam Hussein, whom it described as having "begged" for his life when captured by American forces in 2003. They predicted that the image of Sinwar "standing on the battlefield—in combat attire and out in the open, not in a hideout, facing the enemy" would only strengthen his following.

Analysts noted Israel's difficulty in controlling the narrative surrounding Sinwar's death, particularly in the Arab world. Critics highlighted a contradiction between the IDF's portrayal of Sinwar as hiding underground and the circumstances of his death, where he appeared alone and without hostages. Beverley Milton-Edwards, a senior fellow at the Middle East Council on Global Affairs, noted that "those images of Sinwar have already entered the pantheon of Hamas and other militant groups", likely leading to increased support and recruitment. The IDF defended its decision to release the footage, saying it was done for the sake of transparency. An official stated, "We're being transparent; this is what happened. We know that no matter what visuals come out, there is going to be a campaign by Hamas to make him a hero." Some critics suggested a more restrained approach would have been wise, akin to the U.S. decision not to release images of Osama bin Laden's body. Michael Milshtein, a former head of Palestinian civilian affairs for the Israeli military, remarked, "Maybe an announcement is enough, or a single, more generic photo. It was not really necessary to provide all the details, which have contributed to the myth of Sinwar."

== Reactions ==
=== Israel ===
Prime Minister Benjamin Netanyahu said Sinwar’s killing was a heavy blow to Hamas and added that the war would continue until all hostages were returned.

Defense Minister Yoav Gallant tweeted that "Israel is committed to eliminating terrorists wherever they are". He stated that the killing "sends a clear message to all the families of the fallen and the families of the hostages: we are doing everything in order to reach those who harmed your loved ones and to free the hostages and return them to their families", and added that it was "also a clear message to the residents of Gaza. The man who brought disaster and death to the Gaza Strip, the man who made you suffer as a result of his murderous actions – the end of this man has come. It is time to go out, release the hostages, [to those involved in fighting] raise your hands, surrender. Go out with the hostages, free them, and surrender."

Opposition leader Yair Lapid said the government must seize the opportunity to act decisively regarding the hostages.

The Israeli new shekel appreciated by 0.75% against the dollar and 1.4% against the euro on the foreign exchange market on 17 October following reports of Sinwar's death, reflecting investor response to the event.

The families of Israeli hostages, while expressing pride in the IDF's elimination of Sinwar, also voiced concern that the 101 hostages still held in Gaza are now at even greater risk. They urged Israeli and US leaders to capitalize on this military success by negotiating an immediate deal for the hostages' release, stressing that true victory can only be achieved when all the captives are safely returned.

=== Hamas ===
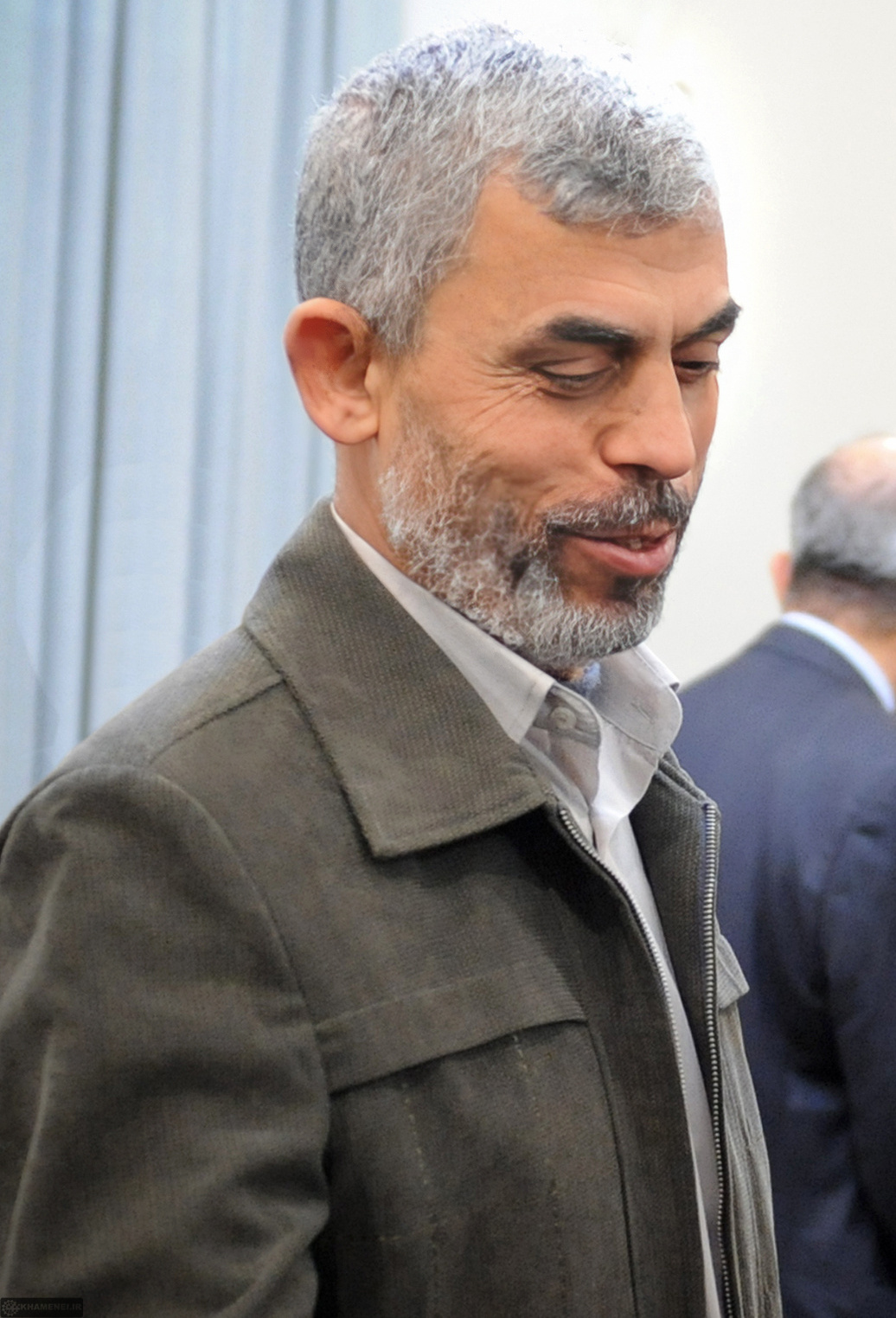
Sinwar in 2012

Initially, the Hamas-affiliated news agency Gaza Now denied Sinwar's death, posting: "Warning, the news that spoke about the assassination of Hamas leader Yahya Sinwar is completely false, and the occupation's publication and circulation of this news is an attempt to collect intelligence information, [as] it did previously with leader Muhammad al-Deif. Please be careful."

A day later, on 18 October, Sinwar's death was confirmed by Hamas official Basem Naim, who asserted that "Hamas becomes stronger and more popular with each elimination of its leaders. It hurts to lose people, especially unique leaders like Yahya Sinwar, but we are sure we will win in the end." Khalil al-Hayya, the Qatar-based deputy leader of Hamas and the primary negotiator for Hamas in the hostage negotiations, said that the hostages would not be released until Israel withdrew from the Gaza Strip. He said that Sinwar had died "facing and not retreating, engaging in the front lines and moving between combat positions" and called him "a continuation of the caravan of great martyrs in the footsteps of the founding Sheikh Ahmed Yassin," adding that "Hamas is moving forward until the establishment of the Palestinian state on all Palestinian soil with Jerusalem as its capital."

Hamas's political bureau called Sinwar's death "painful and distressing".

=== Middle East ===
- PLO: The group expressed its condolences for Sinwar's "martyrdom", labelling him a "great national leader" and calling for unity among all Palestinian factions. It called for a united struggle against Israel to reclaim Palestinian rights, including the right of return, the end of the Israeli occupation and establishment of a Palestinian state on 1967 borders with Jerusalem as its capital. In a separate statement, Fatah stated that Israel's policy of "killing and terrorism will not succeed in breaking the will of our people to achieve their legitimate national rights to freedom and independence".
- Hezbollah: The Iran-backed group praised Sinwar for leading "one of the most humiliating operations in the history of the Israeli occupiers" and said that he had won all the "medals of honor and dignity" in his life of struggle against Israel. Hezbollah also stated that his martyrdom will "strengthen the resolve and determination of the resistance in all the battlefields and arenas to proceed on the road of liberating Palestine and eradicating the cancerous Zionist tumour".
- Houthis: Houthi Leader Abdul-Malik al-Houthi called Sinwar a martyr who died in the “field of confrontation, valour, and honour.” Mohammad Abdelsalam, a spokesman for the group, expressed his "sincere condolences" to Hamas and Palestinians for Sinwar receiving the "medal of martyrdom", adding that Gaza and the Palestinian cause is "destined for victory, no matter how great the sacrifices". Another spokesperson, Yahya Saree, said that the death of Sinwar "increases the determination of the resistance."
- Al-Qaeda: Abu Walid al-Masri, an advisor to Saif al-Adel, Al-Qaeda's current de facto emir, hailed Sinwar and urged Hamas to release Israeli hostages, stating that the focus on their recovery was overshadowing the plight of Palestinian prisoners held by Israel, and emphasized that the hostage issue should be "closed" to avoid further consequences.
- Iran: State media described Sinwar's death as "martyrdom" and praised him for dying in the struggle against Israel in Gaza. Hossein Kazeruni, a hard-line cleric, said on X that Mr. Sinwar died fighting Israel's military "like a man, weapon in hand, wrapped in kaffiyeh, chest out". Foreign minister, Abbas Araghchi, praised Sinwar, adding that "Martyrs live forever, and the cause for liberation of Palestine from occupation is more alive than ever." The Iranian mission to the UN stated that Sinwar's killing will "strengthen the spirit of resistance," adding that he "will become a role model for the youth and children who will follow his path toward the liberation of Palestine." Supreme leader Ali Khamenei described Sinwar as "a shining figure of resistance and struggle," stating that his death will not stop the 'Axis of Resistance.'

=== International ===
- Afghanistan: Government spokesperson Zabihullah Mujahid released a statement online sharing condolences for the "martyrdom" of Yahya Sinwar. The statement also went over how Sinwar's death would only reinvigorate the "resistance and jihadist struggle".
- Argentina: President Javier Milei shared a post by National Deputy Sabrina Ajmechet, welcoming the killing of Sinwar as "the best news that those wanting to end terrorism could receive", thanking Israel for the operation. Furthermore, the Argentine Embassy in Israel highlighted the killing of Sinwar and demanded the release of the hostages, including those with Argentine citizenship.
- Australia: Minister for Foreign Affairs Penny Wong stated that: "Sinwar was a terrorist whose actions caused untold suffering... His violent career as the leader of Hamas culminated in the single most devastating slaughter of Jewish people since the Holocaust." She also expressed hope that his death will bring about the end of the war.
- Canada: Prime Minister Justin Trudeau stated: "Yahya Sinwar, the brutal leader of the terrorist organization Hamas, has been eliminated by the IDF. Under Sinwar's leadership, Hamas carried out the horrific atrocities of October 7, sought to destroy Israel, and launched senseless, devastating terror attacks on civilians across the region. Today delivers a measure of justice for his victims and their families. Sinwar's death ends a reign of terror."
- China: In a query about the killing of Sinwar, Ministry of Foreign Affairs spokesperson Mao Ning stated that "China believes that the pressing priority is to fully and effectively implement relevant UN Security Council resolutions, immediately reach a ceasefire in Gaza, earnestly protect civilians, ensure the humanitarian aid and avoid further escalating the conflict and confrontation."
- European Union: Foreign Policy Chief Josep Borrell called Sinwar "an obstacle to an urgently needed ceasefire and unconditional release of all hostages", adding that he was a "terrorist" responsible for the 7 October attacks.
- France: President Emmanuel Macron stated: "Yahya Sinwar was the main person responsible for the terrorist attacks and barbaric acts of October 7th. Today, I think with emotion of the victims, including 48 of our compatriots, and their loved ones. France demands the release of all hostages still held by Hamas."
- Germany: Foreign Minister Annalena Baerbock said "Sinwar was a brutal murderer and terrorist, who wanted to destroy Israel and its people. As the mastermind of the terror on Oct. 7 he brought death to thousands of people and immeasurable suffering to a whole region. Hamas must now release all hostages and lay down its weapons, the suffering of the people in Gaza must finally end."
- Italy: Prime Minister Giorgia Meloni stated: "With the death of Yahya Sinwar comes the demise of the main perpetrator of the October 7, 2023 massacre. My belief is that a new phase must now begin: It is time for all hostages to be released, for an immediate ceasefire to be proclaimed, and for reconstruction to begin in Gaza. We will continue to vigorously support every effort in this direction and for the resumption of a serious and credible political process leading to the two-state solution."
- Malaysia: Prime Minister Anwar Ibrahim tweeted on X: "Malaysia mourns the loss of a fighter and defender of the Palestinian people, Al Shahid Yahya Sinwar who was brutally murdered by the barbaric Zionist regime. Once again, the international community failed to fight and ensure that peace and justice were upheld thus worsening the conflict situation. Malaysia strongly condemned the killing, and it was clear that the regime's attempt to undermine the demand for release would not succeed. As a result, Malaysia insists that Israel's barbarity be contradicted by the international community and that the ongoing massacre of Palestinians must be stopped immediately."
- NATO: Secretary-General Mark Rutte said that Sinwar "is widely recognized as the architect of the Oct. 7th, 2023, terrorist attacks on Israel. I have condemned them, all allies have condemned them. Every reasonable soul in the world has condemned them. So if he has died, I personally will not miss him."
- Russia: Kremlin Press Secretary Dmitry Peskov said Russia had "serious concerns" about the consequences of the Israeli killing of Sinwar, particularly for the civilian population.
- Turkey: Foreign minister Hakan Fidan expressed his condolences for "the martyrdom" of Sinwar during talks with Hamas political bureau members.
- United Kingdom: Secretary of Defence John Healey remarked, "I for one, will not mourn the death of a terror leader like Sinwar—someone who was responsible for the terror attack on October 7th." Healey added that he and the UK government recognize this attack "triggered not just the darkest, deadliest day for the Jewish people since the Second World War, but that it's triggered more than a year of conflict and an intolerable level of civilian Palestinian casualties." Prime Minister Keir Starmer said the United Kingdom "will not mourn" the death of Sinwar.
- United States: President Joe Biden issued a press statement, declaring, "This is a good day for Israel, for the United States, and for the world", and noting that "as the leader of the terrorist group Hamas, Sinwar was responsible for the deaths of thousands of Israelis, Palestinians, Americans, and citizens from over 30 countries." Biden praised the Israeli military for their pursuit of Hamas leaders, comparing the operation to the 2011 raid that killed Osama bin Laden, the leader of al-Qaeda. He emphasized that Israel has the right to dismantle Hamas, highlighting that the group can no longer carry out attacks like the one on 7 October. Biden stated that Sinwar's death removed "an insurmountable obstacle", creating hope for a future without Hamas in Gaza and opening the door for a political settlement that benefits both Israelis and Palestinians. Vice President Kamala Harris said "justice has been served" with the death of Sinwar. Biden's National Security Adviser Jake Sullivan said that Sinwar "was a massive obstacle to peace". Biden's predecessor and successor Donald Trump said Sinwar's killing has increased the likelihood of a peaceful solution to the Gaza war, and accused Biden of "trying to hold [Netanyahu] back".

== Aftermath ==
In December 2025, testimonies from an inquiry led by Major General Sami Turgeman stated that Israeli political and military leaders declined operational proposals in 2022 and 2023 to assassinate Sinwar and Mohammed Deif, despite recommendations from the IDF Southern Command and the Shin Bet. According to Israeli generals Aviv Kohavi and his successor Herzi Halevi, the plans were blocked due to a long-standing policy of maintaining calm and preserving Hamas' rule in Gaza, as well as a strategic focus on Hezbollah and Iran.

== See also ==
- Assassination of Abdel Aziz al-Rantisi
- Assassination of Mahmoud Al-Mabhouh
- Killing of Ahmed Yassin
- 2024 Lebanon pager explosions
- Assassination of Fuad Shukr
- Assassination of Hassan Nasrallah
- Assassination of Ismail Haniyeh
- Attacks on Iranian officials:
  - April 2024 Israeli strikes on Iran
  - Assassination of Qasem Soleimani
  - Assassination of Ali Khamenei
