= Iranian support for Hamas =

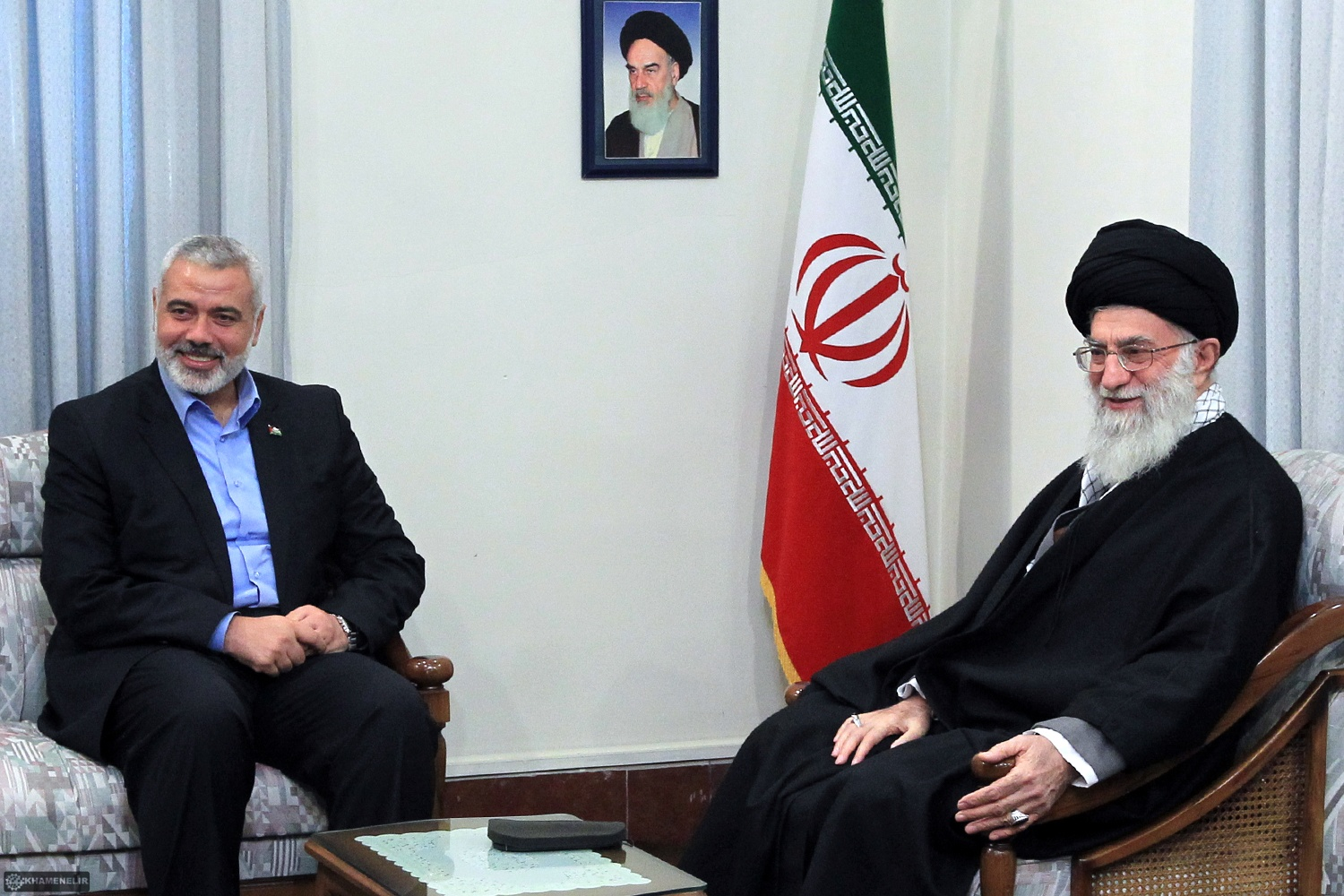
Hamas leader Ismail Haniyeh and Iranian supreme leader Ali Khamenei in 2012.

Since the early 1990s, the Islamic Republic of Iran has been sponsoring Hamas with military aid, training and financial aid. Iran has remained a key patron of Hamas, providing them with funds, weapons, and training.

According to a 2020 US Department of State report, Iran provides about $100 million annually to Palestinian militant groups, including Hamas. As of 2023, according to an Israeli security source, Iran had significantly increased its funding for Hamas to $350 million a year.

== History ==
=== 1980s–1990s ===
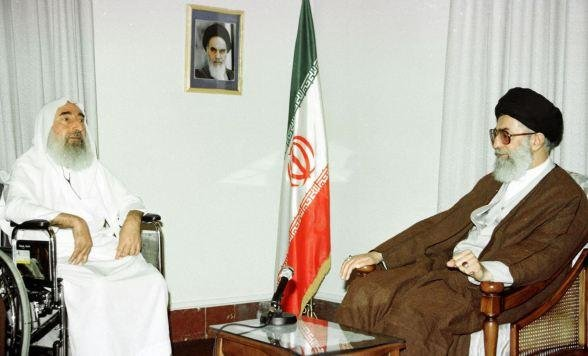
Hamas founder Ahmed Yassin meeting with Iranian supreme leader Ayatollah Khamenei in Tehran in 1998

Relations between Iran and Hamas strengthened after the PLO pursued peace efforts with Israel. In 1990, Iran hosted a conference in Tehran supporting Palestine, which was attended by Hamas but not by Yasser Arafat. During the early 1990s, a delegation from Hamas, headed by Mousa Abu Marzouk, engaged in discussions in Tehran with senior officials, among them Ayatollah Khamenei. Iran then committed to both military and financial backing, with reportedly $30 million per year, in addition to providing military training to thousands of Hamas members at Revolutionary Guard bases in Iran and Lebanon. Furthermore, Hamas inaugurated an office in Tehran, stating that both Iran and Hamas shared an "identical view in the strategic outlook toward the Palestinian cause in its Islamic dimension."

==== 1995 Kfar Darom bus attack ====
According to the U.S. Department of State, the Iranian Intelligence Minister Ali Fallahian authorized the Kfar Darom bus attack, a suicide bombing operation that targeted a bus full of Israeli soldiers and Israeli settlers in the Gaza Strip. Seven Israeli soldiers and one settler were killed. The operation was a joint Hamas and Palestinian Islamic Jihad operation, the perpetrator was an Islamic Jihad militant and the bomb was designed by Hamas military wing leader Yahya Ayyash.

==== 1996 Jaffa Road bus bombings ====
After Israel assassinated Ayyash on 5 January 1996, Mohammed Deif organized a mass-casualty bombing campaign inside Israel as retaliation, including the Dizengoff Center suicide bombing in Tel Aviv and the two Jaffa Road bus bombings in Jerusalem. These operations were, in their scale, scope and sophistication, different and larger than any attacks of the past, and it has been alleged that both Syria and Iran had helped in their planning and financing. According to a report, Syrian Minister of Defense Mustafa Tlass instructed Ghazi Kanaan, the commander of Syrian forces in Lebanon, to establish links between Hezbollah and Hamas fighters, who were then trained both in Lebanon and in Iran and participated in the retaliatory operations for the murder of Ayyash. According to Mike Kelly, Hamas operative Hassan Salameh, who planned three of the attacks, was trained in Iran. In 2000, families of American victims of the attacks filed a lawsuit against Tlass, Kanaan and Iranian Minister of Intelligence Ali Fallahian.

=== Second Intifada ===
Iran's support for Hamas continued through the violence of the Second Intifada. Following Arafat's passing in 2004 and Israel's exit from Gaza in 2005, Tehran's support progressively increased.

According to Lebanese militant Anis al-Naqqash, during the Second Intifada, Major General Qasem Soleimani, commander of the Islamic Revolutionary Guard Corps' elite Quds Force, and Imad Mughniyeh, chief of military operations for Hezbollah, oversaw the smuggling of weapons to the Palestinian Hamas and Islamic Jihad factions.

=== Hamas seizure of the Gaza Strip ===
IRGC air force commander in front of the Hamas flag in 2020 (third flag from the right)

Iran and Hamas became dramatically closer following Hamas' unexpected win in the 2006 Palestinian elections and its violent seizure of the Gaza Strip in 2007. In 2006, Iran intervened to support the nearly insolvent Palestinian Authority in Gaza, which was now under Hamas control, as foreign aid collapsed. During a December 2006 visit to Tehran by Hamas Prime Minister Ismail Haniyeh, Iran committed to providing $250 million in assistance.

=== 2008–2009 Gaza War ===
According to Arash Azizi, during the 2008–2009 Gaza War Hamas used Iranian-engineered missiles, many of its commanders had been personally trained by Soleimani in Iran, and Iranian arms were funneled to Gaza using Sudanese ports and tunnels in the Egyptian Sinai.

=== Tunnel warfare ===
After the 2007 imposition of a blockade on the Gaza Strip by Israel and Egypt, the Iranian Quds Force under the longtime direction of General Qasem Soleimani had been active in supporting the further construction of tunnels under Gaza and the smuggling of weapons through these tunnels to the armed wings of Hamas and the Palestinian Islamic Jihad. In 2021 senior Hamas representative to Lebanon, Ahmad Abd al-Hadi said:

The idea of [digging] tunnels... Today there are 360 kilometers of tunnels in Gaza. There are more than 360 kilometers of tunnels underground. I won't go into details on this. Two people came up with the idea of digging these tunnels: The first is the martyred commander Imad Mughniyeh, and the second is Hajj Qasem Soleimani who went to Gaza more than once and contributed to the defense plan from the moment it was first drafted. I am not divulging any secret, by the way. The enemies know all this but what the enemies do not know is way more than what they do know.

Iranian Brigadier-General Abdolfattah Ahvazian, adviser to the Commander of the Quds Force, said in November 2023 regarding Soleimani's role in the construction and proliferation of the Gaza tunnel network:

After the martyrdom of Hajj Qasem [Soleimani], the guys from Hamas showed us a movie. I watched the movie, and according to the people of Hamas there, Hajj Qasem had gone into Gaza. He said to them: 'Why are you sitting idly by?' They answered: 'Hajj, there is no way.' So he gave the order to take a Jihadi action, and dig hundreds of tunnels, crossing the [Gaza] borders. Within three years, the Palestinians have dug hundreds of tunnels, approximately 800 km-long, with pickaxes and hoes. These are not the kind of tunnels that only mice can use. These tunnels allow the passage of cars, mules with ammunition, and motorcycles. 700 kilometers with nothing but pickaxes and hoes.

Retired Islamic Revolutionary Guard Corps General Ezzatollah Zarghami admitted in November 2023 of having visited and inspected the Gaza tunnels himself along with senior Hamas members, during his active service with the Quds Force:

Fajr-3, which is a 240 mm rocket, was one of our products. Later, we made its warhead smaller and it had a range of 70 km. My first mission was to take this rocket... I say this with the utmost pride and with no fear of anyone. The Leader has already said that we were helping [Hamas]. We support the oppressed everywhere – Shiite Hezbollah as well as Sunni Hamas. These are what [Khamenei] has declared in the past. I traveled to the region as the production manager of those rockets, and I supplied them both to Hezbollah and the Palestinians. For some time, I was inside the very same tunnels that they are fighting from. Six or seven years ago, I posted about this and got the nickname 'yellow canary.' In the tunnels, I provided training about the usage and specification of the rockets. These training courses were highly successful. I saw that they had cages of singing canaries in the tunnels. I praised their commander about their acumen to have music during military work. The commander replied that the birds are not meant for singing, they are meant to be [oxygen] sensors in case the airflow is disrupted. If the airflow becomes weaker, the birds stop singing and drop dead. When the bird dies, we realize that there is a problem with airflow.

In December 2023 Mansour Haghighatpour, also a retired Quds Force General, stated that the creation of the tunnels under Gaza was an effort not only by the Palestinians but by the whole "Axis of Resistance":

The other thing I would like to point out is that the resistance axis, which planned with the Palestinians to build more than 400 kilometers of tunnels under an area of land that did not exceed 40 square kilometers, took various possible “scenarios” into consideration. These scenarios include [Israel] flooding the tunnels with water, pumping toxic gas into them, or blowing up parts of them. Therefore, the Palestinian side in the tunnels knows very well how to deal with all possible challenges.

In January 2024 the Shi'ite cleric Sheikh Jaffer Ladak asserted that Soleimani had played a major role in influencing the strategy of the Palestinian factions, turning it away from the suicide bombing attacks widely employed at the time of the Second Intifada and towards an underground warfare strategy:

Zarqawi was the one who began the idea of suicide bombings and then, he used this influence upon the Palestinians who then felt it was needful to be able to do suicide bombings in the occupied territories. Suicide bombings, of course, not only has a great problem with it, it is not with the flavor of Islamic resistance. It doesn't yield the goals, and also drew the ire of the world community on the Palestinian resistance. Enter people like martyr Qasem Soleimani. And, with his influence, you would actually see that the structure of the Palestinian resistance was overhauled. The tunnels that were being tug, and its relationship with the rest of the Islamic world, particularly those in Lebanon, particularly those in Iran, flourished, to such an extent that now, the so-called strongest army in West Asia still cannot defeat those people who have been starved for more than three months.

During the November 2012 Israeli operation in the Gaza Strip, the Commander-in-Chief of the Islamic Revolutionary Guard Corps, Major-General Mohammad Ali Jafari said that due to the geographical isolation of the Gaza Strip, Iran cannot directly provide weapons to Hamas but still provides them with the technology and parts through the tunnels, which is then used by the al-Qassam Brigades to manufacture a Palestinian homemade version of the Iranian Fajr-5 missile that has managed to hit Israeli targets within the city of Tel Aviv.

=== Gaza war ===
On 11 October, 2023, American intelligence collection suggested that Iranian officials were caught by surprise when the 7 October, 2023 attacks happened, indicating the Iranian government did not have prior knowledge of the attacks. In February 2024, the Office of the Director of National Intelligence concluded that "Iranian leaders did not orchestrate nor had foreknowledge of".

Nevertheless, western sources have indirectly attributed some of the blame of the 7 October attacks on Iran. One Western source said "If you train people on how to use weapons, you expect them to eventually use them." While the editor of a London-based newspaper said "supporting a group doesn't mean that they can determine in minute detail these actions". He adds that Iran considered October 7 a setback as it halted the sanctions relief that Iran had been getting earlier in 2023.

On 8 October, a Wall Street Journal article claimed Iran helped plan the attacks and even green-lit this attacks during a meeting on 2 October. This article was criticized by other WSJ journalists, who were unable to confirm these allegations. The article's allegations were denied by American, Iranian and Israeli officials. On 11 October, WSJ published a new article, in which it quoted a US intelligence official as saying "We have not currently seen anything to suggest Iran supported or was behind the attack". According the Israeli military, Hamas documents that it seized in Gaza indicated that Hamas unsuccessfully sought to persuade Iran to join the attacks. Iranian diplomats rejected these allegations, saying "All the planning, decision-making and directing were solely executed by Hamas’s military wing based in Gaza".

During the war, murals in Tehran's Palestine Square, overseen by Iran's Center for Islamic Propaganda, have expressed Iran's support for Hamas. Following Yahya Sinwar's appointment as Hamas's top leader in August 2024, a mural was installed featuring Sinwar with the caption "Martyr of Islam, Commander of Jihad." After Sinwar was killed during an Israeli patrol in mid-October, a new mural displayed the message, "The storm of Sinwar will continue," referencing Al-Aqsa Storm, the term Hamas used for its October 7 attacks on Israel.

== See also ==
- Iran–Palestine relations
- Iran and state-sponsored terrorism
- Qatari support for Hamas
- Turkish support for Hamas
- Russia–Hamas relations
- Hezbollah–Iran relations
- Iranian support for the Houthis
