= Russia–Hamas relations =

Russia has diplomatic relations with the political wing of Hamas, the Palestinian Islamist organization which rules the Gaza Strip. Russia has not designated Hamas as a terrorist organization, though it has condemned Hamas attacks as "terrorism" and has taken a hard line against Islamist terrorism. Russia has also maintained relations with Israel.

== History ==
=== Immediate post-Soviet relations ===
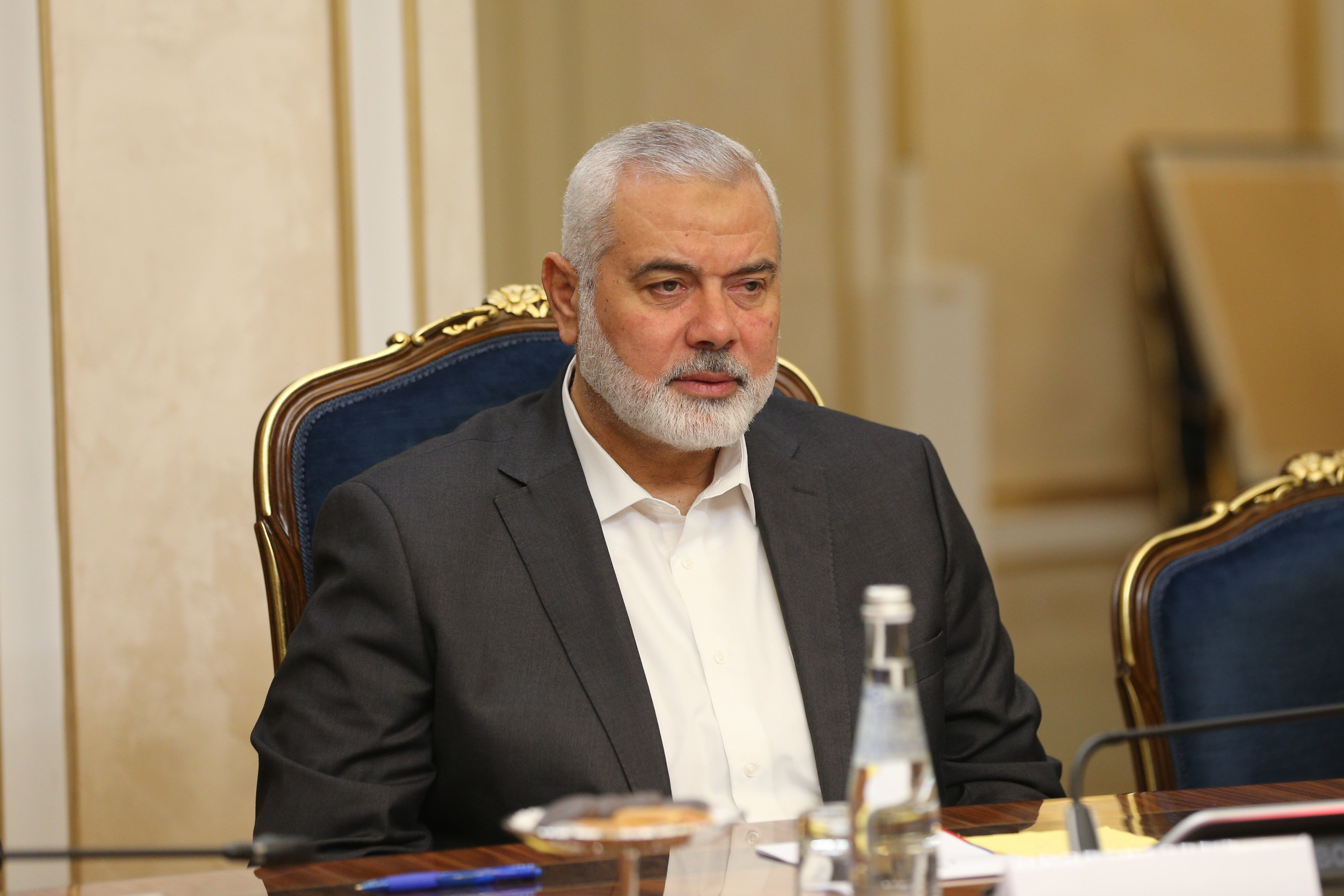
Hamas leader Ismail Haniyeh at a meeting with Russian officials in Moscow in 2022

After the collapse of the Soviet Union in 1991, Russia dramatically improved relations with Israel. Throughout the 1990s and 2000s, the Russian government regularly condemned Hamas attacks, such as the 2004 Beersheba bus bombings that killed 17 people. However, Russia never designated Hamas as a terrorist organization like it did with the Taliban and with several armed groups affiliated with the Chechen Republic of Ichkeria. In 2005, Russian Deputy Foreign Minister Mikhail Bogdanov reaffirmed Russia's position that Russia did not consider Hamas a terrorist group and viewed it as "an integral part of Palestinian society."

=== Hamas takeover of Gaza ===
Relations warmed sharply after the 2006 Palestinian legislative election on 26 January 2006. At his annual press conference on 31 January, After Hamas's victory, Russian President Vladimir Putin emphasized that Russia had never named Hamas a terrorist group, adding that Russia did not "approve and support everything that Hamas does." Putin was among the first world leaders to congratulate the militant group on their victory in the election.

Since 2006, regular meetings have been held between the Hamas politburo and senior Russian Ministry of Foreign Affairs officials. Khaled Mashal, Hamas's then political leader was hosted on an official visit to Moscow in March 2006. The following year, in 2007, Putin hosted Mashal in Moscow. Mashal praised Putin for his "courage and manliness." In 2020, Russian President Dmitry Medvedev met with Mashal.

=== Gaza war ===
During the Gaza war, Russia condemned both the initial Hamas attack and Israel's response. Russia maintained relations with both parties and presented itself as a potential mediator.

After the October 7 attacks, which initiated the war, Russia condemned the attack as "terrorism". Putin sent condolences to the families of the killed Israelis and said Israel had a right to defend itself, describing the Hamas attack as "unprecedented in its cruelty". He also condemned the subsequent Israeli bombardments of Gaza and called for a two-state solution to resolve the conflict. Russian UN diplomats later condemned both the Hamas attack on Israel and Israeli shelling of civilian neighborhoods in Gaza. However, Russia voted against a resolution condemning Hamas at the United Nations General Assembly.

Some commentators said that Russia has grown closer to Hamas and more hostile to Israel. According to The New York Times, Russian state media and leading social networking platforms spread support for Hamas and denigrated Israel and its main ally, the U.S. Putin has said that the war shows "a clear example of the failure of U.S. policy in the Middle East". On 14 October, Hamas thanked Putin for his "position regarding the ongoing Zionist aggression against our people." On 26 October, Moscow hosted a Hamas political delegation, led by Mousa Abu Marzook, which Israel condemned as "a reprehensible step that gives support to terrorism and legitimacy to the horrific acts of Hamas terrorists." Amid the war's hostage crisis, Hamas released kidnapped Russian-Israeli dual nationals. Hamas described these actions as a gesture of appreciation for Russia's support for the Palestinian cause.

In December 2023, Russia's Foreign Minister Sergey Lavrov said that Israel's stated goals in its invasion of Gaza were similar to Russia's stated goals in its invasion of Ukraine.

== See also ==
- Israel–Russia relations
- Palestine–Russia relations
- Russia and the Iran–Israel proxy conflict
- Iranian support for Hamas
- Qatari support for Hamas
- Turkish support for Hamas
- Hezbollah–Russia relations
