= Qatari support for Hamas =

Qatar has been a key financial supporter of the Palestinian militant organization Hamas, transferring more than $1.8 billion to Hamas over the years. In consultation with the U.S. and Israeli governments, $30 million were transferred monthly to Hamas, according to a Qatari official interviewed by Der Spiegel in 2023. The United States requested in 2011 that Qatar provide a base for the Hamas leadership to ease communications with the group. From 2012, Qatar hosted the Hamas party leadership when Hamas head Khaled Mashal relocated from Syria to Qatar. Ismail Haniyeh, who succeeded Mashal as political head of Hamas, had also resided in Doha as of 2016. Qatar has been called Hamas' most important financial backer and foreign ally.

From 2018 to 2023, Israel's government enabled and approved Qatari support for Hamas for political reasons. In May 2024, it was reported that the United States had urged Qatar to remove Hamas leaders from its territory if they declined to agree to a hostage deal with Israel. Later, it was reported that Qatar was reviewing the future of Hamas' office in Doha as part of a broader evaluation of its role as a mediator in the Gaza war. In November 2024, reports emerged that Qatar had ended its mediation between Israel and Hamas and ordered the group to leave the country following U.S. pressure, after another Hamas rejection of a ceasefire deal; however, both Qatar and Hamas denied the claims.

In an April 2024 interview with Haaretz, Majed Al-Ansari—Advisor to the Prime Minister of Qatar and Official Spokesperson for the Ministry of Foreign Affairs of the State of Qatar—addressed criticism regarding Doha's ties to Hamas, stating, “We did not enter into a relationship with Hamas because we wanted to. We were asked by the U.S. We reviewed that request in 2006.” He rejected allegations of unilateral financial support, noting, “If you are going to attack Qatar by saying that Qatar funded Hamas – our partner in this funding was the Israeli government.” Furthermore, Al-Ansari emphasized that Israeli leadership actively encouraged these financial transfers, adding, “As a matter of fact, we were asked to increase that aid, and on a number of times, we were asked to continue that aid when we were reconsidering providing aid to Gaza by the Israeli government.”

== History ==
In 2007, Qatar was, with Turkey, the only country to back Hamas after the group ousted the Palestinian Authority from the Gaza Strip. The relationship between Hamas and Qatar strengthened in 2008 and 2009 when Khaled Meshaal was invited to attend the Doha Summit where he was seated next to the then Qatari Emir Hamad bin Khalifa al-Thani, who pledged $250 million to repair the damage caused by Israel in the Israeli war on Gaza. These events caused Qatar to become the main player in the "Palestinian issue". Qatar called Gaza's blockade unjust and immoral, which prompted the Hamas government in Gaza, including former Prime Minister Ismail Haniyeh, to thank Qatar for their "unconditional" support. Qatar then began regularly handing out political, material, humanitarian, and charitable support for Hamas.

In 2011, U.S. President Barack Obama personally requested that Qatar, one of the U.S.'s most important Arab allies, provide a base for the Hamas leadership. At the time, the U.S. were seeking to establish communications with Hamas and believed that a Hamas office in Qatar would be easier to access than a Hamas bureau in Iran, the group's main backer. In 2012, Hamad became the first head of state to visit Gaza under Hamas rule. He pledged to raise $400 million for reconstruction. Sources say that advocating for Hamas is politically beneficial to Turkey and Qatar because the Palestinian cause draws popular support amongst their citizens at home.

During a 2015 visit to Palestine, speaking in reference to Qatar's support for Hamas, Qatari official Mohammad al-Emadi said Qatar was using the money not to help Hamas but rather the Palestinian people as a whole. He acknowledged that giving to the Palestinian people means using Hamas as the local contact. Emadi said, "You have to support them. You don't like them, don't like them. But they control the country, you know." Some argue that Hamas's relations with Qatar are putting Hamas in an awkward position because Qatar has become part of the regional Arab problem. In a controversial deal, Israel's government under Benjamin Netanyahu supported Qatar's payments to Hamas for many years in the hope that it would turn Hamas into an effective counterweight to the Palestinian Authority and prevent the establishment of a Palestinian state. Former Mossad official Udi Levy later described Qatari envoys as regularly bringing cash into Gaza in suitcases, with Israel's approval, and said that he believed a significant portion of the money supported Hamas's military wing.

=== Gaza war ===
Following the Hamas surprise attack on southern Israel on 7 October 2023, and the outbreak of the Gaza war, Qatar played a key mediator role in negotiations between Israel and Hamas, brokering a ceasefire agreement in November 2023 that led to the release of about 100 Israeli hostages. In May 2024, it was reported that the United States had urged Qatar to remove Hamas leaders from its territory if they declined to agree to a hostage deal with Israel. According to the BBC, this is the result of the Biden administration's less influence over Israel, which led them to believe that the best way to force some sort of deal was by putting pressure on Hamas.

In May 2024, Mousa Abu Marzouk, Head of Hamas’ Foreign Relations Office, stated that the organization’s presence in Doha was established at the request of the United States following a rift between Hamas leadership and Jordanian authorities. In December 2024, Qatari Prime Minister Mohammed bin Abdulrahman Al Thani addressed international scrutiny regarding the diplomatic office hosted in his country, clarifying that “Hamas’ presence in Doha happened with full transparency and coordination, and at the request of the U.S. and Israel.”

In November 2024, it was reported following another Hamas rejection of a ceasefire deal, Qatar quit mediation between Israel and Hamas and reportedly ordered the group to leave the country following U.S. pressure. However, the Qatari government stated that no such order was made. The Biden administration requested Qatar to kick out Hamas two weeks earlier in October when they rejected another proposal to free Israeli hostages after Israel killed Yahya Sinwar. According to KAN News, Qatar told Hamas, "You are not welcome here", although Hamas officials denied the report. On 9 September 2025, Israel attacked Doha reportedly targeting senior Hamas figures, Khalil al-Hayya, Zaher Jabarin, Muhammad Ismail Darwish, and Khaled Mashal in a Qatari government residential complex as it met to discuss an active ceasefire proposal presented by the United States. The attack killed and injured Hamas members, Qatari security forces, and multiple civilians. The intended targets survived the attack. The attack was condemned by Qatar as it had been mediating efforts for a ceasefire between Israel and Hamas.

== See also ==
- Iranian support for Hamas
- Israeli support for Hamas
- Turkish support for Hamas
- Qatar and state-sponsored terrorism
- Russia–Hamas relations
