= Palestine–Turkey relations =

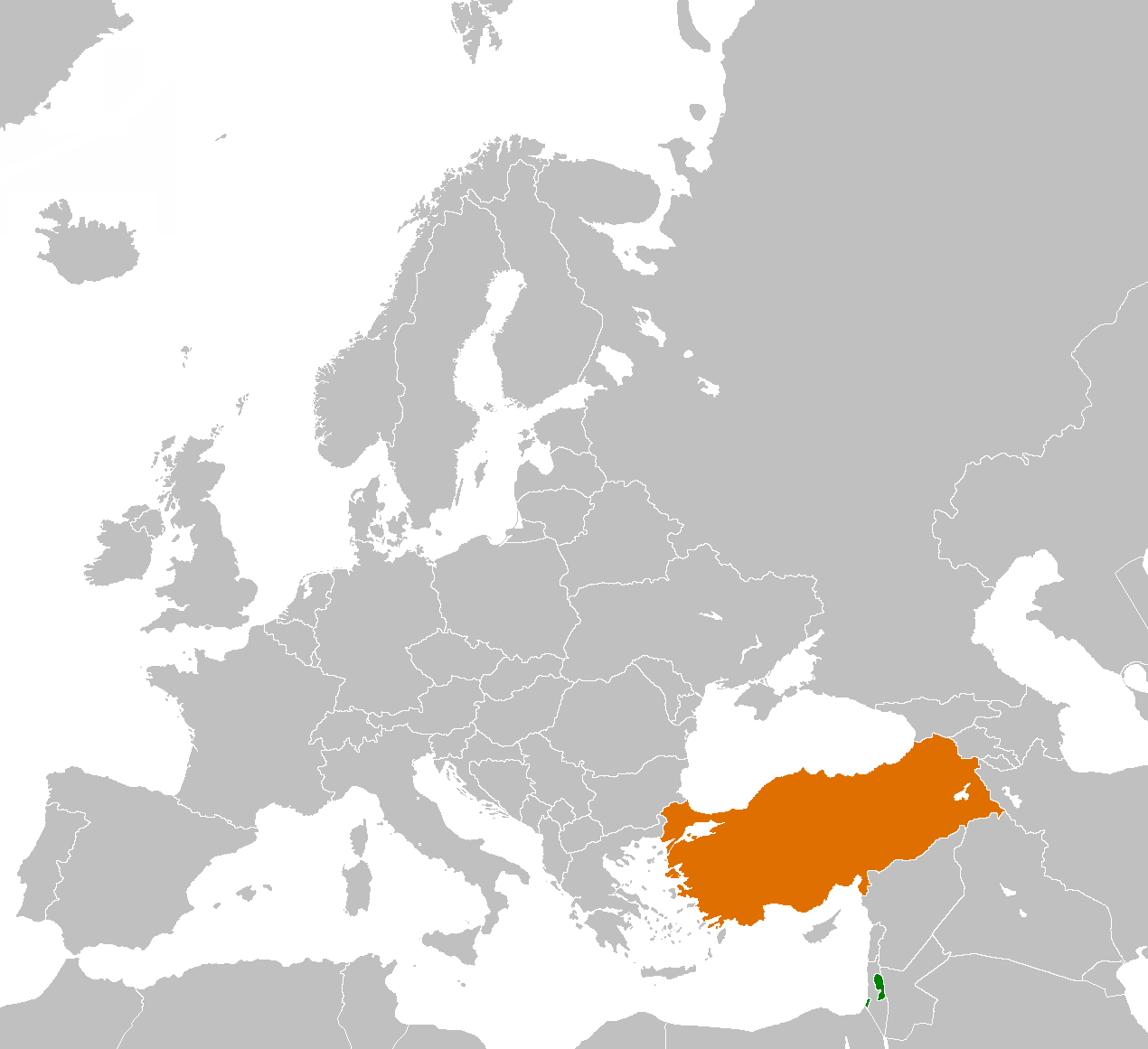

- Palestine: Turkey

Palestine–Turkey relations are the current and historical bilateral relations between Turkey and Palestine. Turkey was one of the first countries of the First World before the end of the Cold War, to recognize State of Palestine. Palestine has an embassy in Ankara and a consulate general in Istanbul.

Turkey's aid has been a source of humanitarian relief to Palestine, especially since the start of the Blockade of the Gaza Strip imposed by Israel and Egypt.

Turkey has a deep-rooted shared history and maintains strong cultural and social connections with the Palestinian people. In 1975, the nation initiated official relations with the Palestine Liberation Organization (PLO) and was among the earliest countries to acknowledge the Palestinian State established in exile on November 15, 1988.

== History ==
In spite of Turkey's constructive relations with Israel, diplomacy between Turkey and the Palestinian National Authority has been relatively strong and helpful, especially when Prime Minister Recep Tayyip Erdoğan took action in verbally countering Israel's standoff against Gaza fighters. Historically, Palestine was under Turkish (Ottoman Empire) rule for four hundred years prior to the days of the British Mandate of Palestine. Turkey has sought to take over Egypt's role as mediator in the Intra-Palestinian reconciliation process. It, along with Qatar, provides the Hamas movement in Gaza with political humanitarian and diplomatic support.

Turkey welcomed a UN vote on 30 November 2012, giving Palestine non-member statehood in the world body, saying the dramatic gesture would bolster the moribund Israeli–Palestinian peace process.

== See also ==
- Foreign relations of Palestine
- Foreign relations of Turkey
- Turks in Palestine
- Israel–Turkey relations
- Turkish support for Hamas
