= Jaffa Road bus bombings =

1996 terrorist attack in Israel

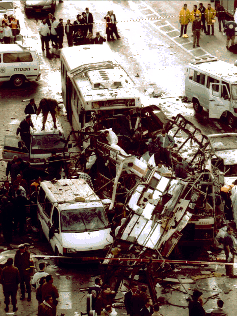
- Aftermath of the February 25 attack

- The attack site
- Location: 31°47′20″N 35°12′20″E; Jerusalem
- Date: February 25, 1996; 30 years ago
- Attack type: Suicide bombing
- Deaths: 27 in total: 17 Israeli civilians; 9 Israeli soldiers; 1 Palestinian terrorist
- Injuries: 48 (mostly civilians)
- Perpetrators: Assailant, trained, armed, and supported by Iran. Hamas claimed responsibility.

The Jaffa Road bus bombings were Palestinian suicide attacks carried out in 1996 on two No. 18 buses on Jaffa Road in Jerusalem. Hamas suicide bombers killed 45 people in the attacks, which were masterminded by Mohammed Deif, using explosives prepared by Adnan Awul. These two bombings, within a few days of each other, occurred during a Hamas offensive launched after the killing of Yahya Ayyash, which also included the French Hill neighborhood attack, a suicide bombing in Ashkelon, and a terrorist attack near Dizengoff Center in Tel Aviv.

== Background ==
After the Shin Bet assassinated Hamas military leader Yahya Ayyash on 5 January 1996, Mohammed Deif, now commander of the Qassam Brigades, organized a mass-casualty bombing campaign inside Israel as retaliation, including the Dizengoff Center suicide bombing in Tel Aviv and the two Jaffa Road bus bombings in Jerusalem. These operations were, in their scale, scope and sophistication, different and larger than any attacks of the past, and it has been alleged that both Syria and Iran had helped in their planning and financing. According to a report, Syrian Minister of Defense Mustafa Tlass instructed Ghazi Kanaan, the commander of Syrian forces in Lebanon, to establish links between Hezbollah and Hamas fighters, who were then trained both in Lebanon and in Iran and participated in the retaliatory operations for the murder of Ayyash. According to Mike Kelly, Hamas operative Hassan Salameh, who planned three of the attacks, was trained in Iran. In 2000, families of American victims of the attacks filed a lawsuit against Tlass, Kanaan and Iranian Minister of Intelligence Ali Fallahian.

== First bombing ==
On the morning of February 25, 1996, a suicide bomber blew himself up on a No.18 bus traveling down Jaffa Road near the Jerusalem Central Bus Station. 17 civilians and 9 Israeli soldiers were killed and 48, mostly civilians, injured.

In 2014 journalist Mike Kelly published The Bus on Jaffa Road; A Story of Middle East Terrorism and the Search for Justice. Kirkus Reviews praised it as, "a spiral of horror and reckoning".

Sarah Duker, 23, who was studying science at Hebrew University, and her boyfriend, Matthew Eisenfeld, 25, a seminary student from West Hartford, Conn., were killed in the attack. The two were described as sympathetic to the peace process and committed to Mideast peace. Ms. Duker was the second New Jersey woman to lose her life in a terrorist attack in less than a year. Alisa Flatow, 20, of West Orange was killed in April by a suicide bomber in the Gaza Strip Kfar Darom bus attack. Both Ms. Flatow and Ms. Duker attended the same high school in Paramus.

According to Kelly, Yassir Arafat was aware of these planned bombings.

=== Attack planner ===
Hamas operative Hassan Salameh was captured by Israel in Hebron in May 1996. Israel, which has only twice imposed a death penalty, sentenced Salameh to 46 consecutive life sentences for directing 3 mass-casualty attacks. Salameh has continued to maintain that he acted in a righteous manner in bombing civilian buses, saying, "I believe what I did is a legitimate right my religion and all of the world gave me..." in 1997, and in an interview almost 2 decades later. According to Mike Kelly, Salameh was trained in Iran.

== Second bombing ==
On the morning of March 3, 1996, a suicide bomber boarded another No. 18 bus, detonating an explosive belt that killed 16 civilians, three Israeli soldiers, and wounded seven others.

Jaffa Road bus bombing (March 3, 1996)
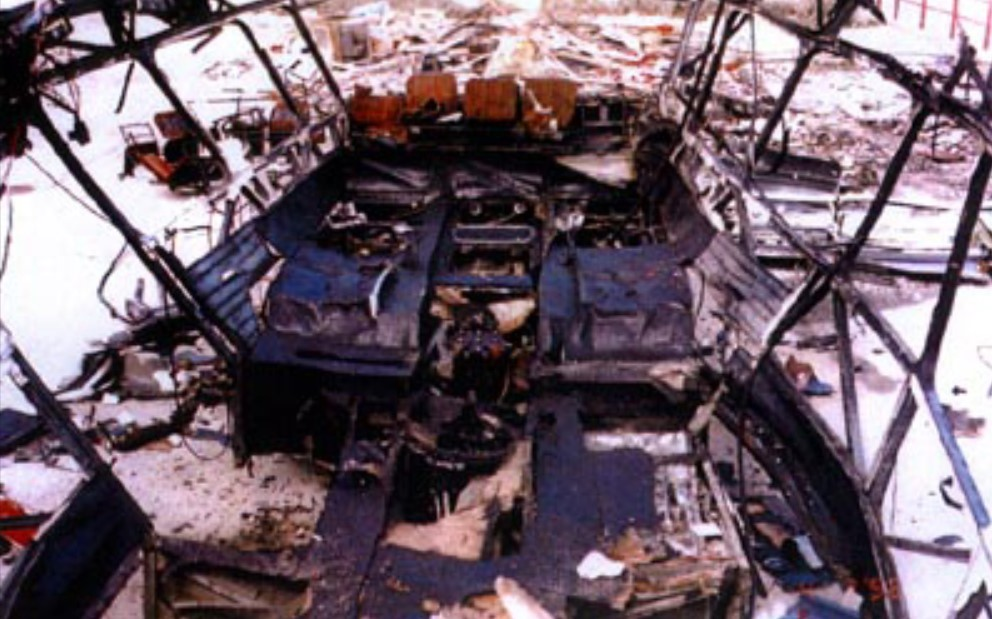
- The attack aftermath
- Location: Jerusalem
- Date: March 3, 1996; 30 years ago
- Attack type: Suicide bomber
- Deaths: 20 in total: 16 Israeli civilians; 3 Israeli soldiers; 1 attacker
- Injuries: 7 civilians
- Perpetrator: Hamas claimed responsibility.
- Assailant: Mohammed Abdo

== Aftermath ==
Israel arrested Hamas militant Mohammed Abu Warda in 2002 for helping to organize the series of suicide bombings that killed more than 40 people and wounded more than 100 others. He was sentenced to 48 life sentences, one of the longest sentences ever imposed. According to Palestinian authorities, at the time of his arrest Warda had been recruiting suicide bombers, including students at Ramallah Teachers College, who conducted attacks targeting civilian crowds during the Second Intifada. Warda was released in 2025 as part of the January 2025 Gaza war ceasefire.

After learning that the mastermind of the February 25 bombing was a Hamas militant trained and recruited by Iran, the Eisenfeld and Duker families sued Iran and won a $327 million judgment in 2000, including $300 million in punitive damages and $27 million in compensatory damages. The Clinton Administration then blocked the families' efforts to seize certain Iranian assets in the United States. As of 2006 collection efforts continue through legal processes. The families, together with the family of another United States citizen killed in the same attack, now seek as much as US$900 million from Iran. In 2006 an Italian court domesticated the US court ruling, and temporarily froze Iranian assets. The plaintiffs have stated that they intend to pursue Iran through other European Union courts.

In 2020, Rep. Josh Gottheimer, D-NJ, introduced a House of Representatives resolution to condemn payments to Hassan Salameh, a high-ranking Hamas leader who orchestrated the plot that killed Duker.

== Gallery ==
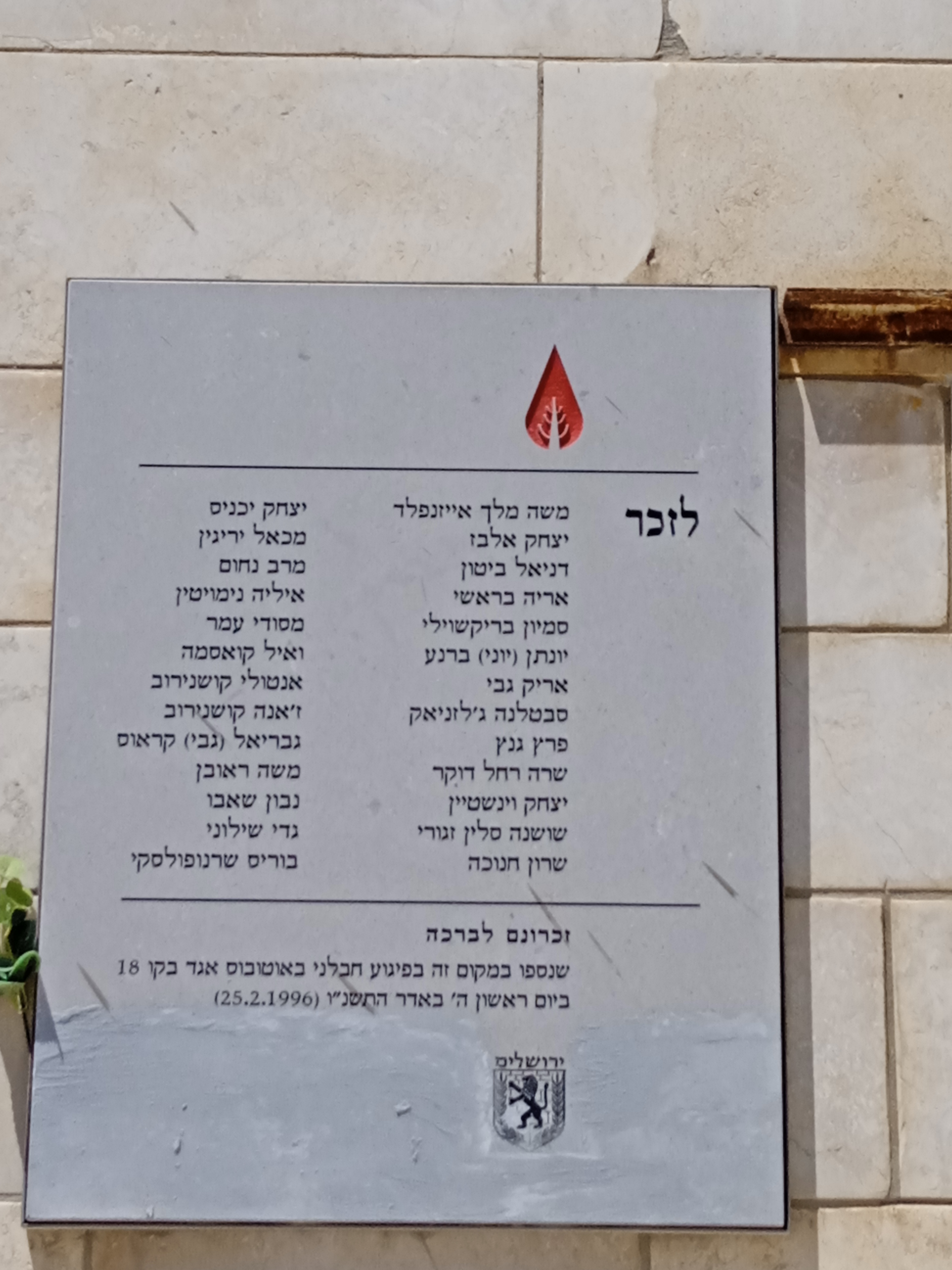
Commemorative plaque for the victims of the first bus bombing

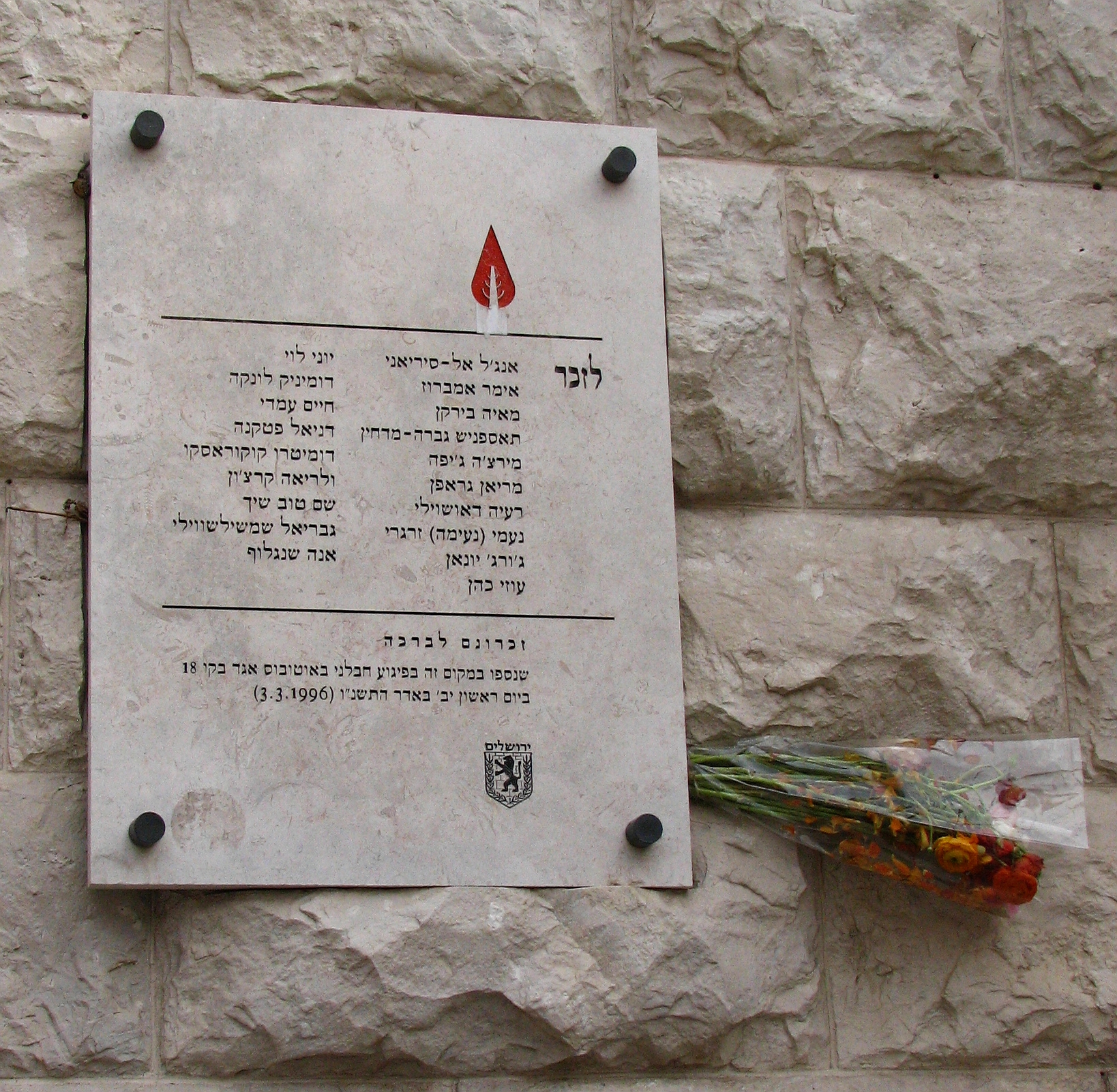
Commemorative plaque for those who were killed in the second bombing

== See also ==
- List of Palestinian suicide attacks
- Palestinian suicide attacks
- Palestinian political violence
