= Hezbollah–Russia relations =

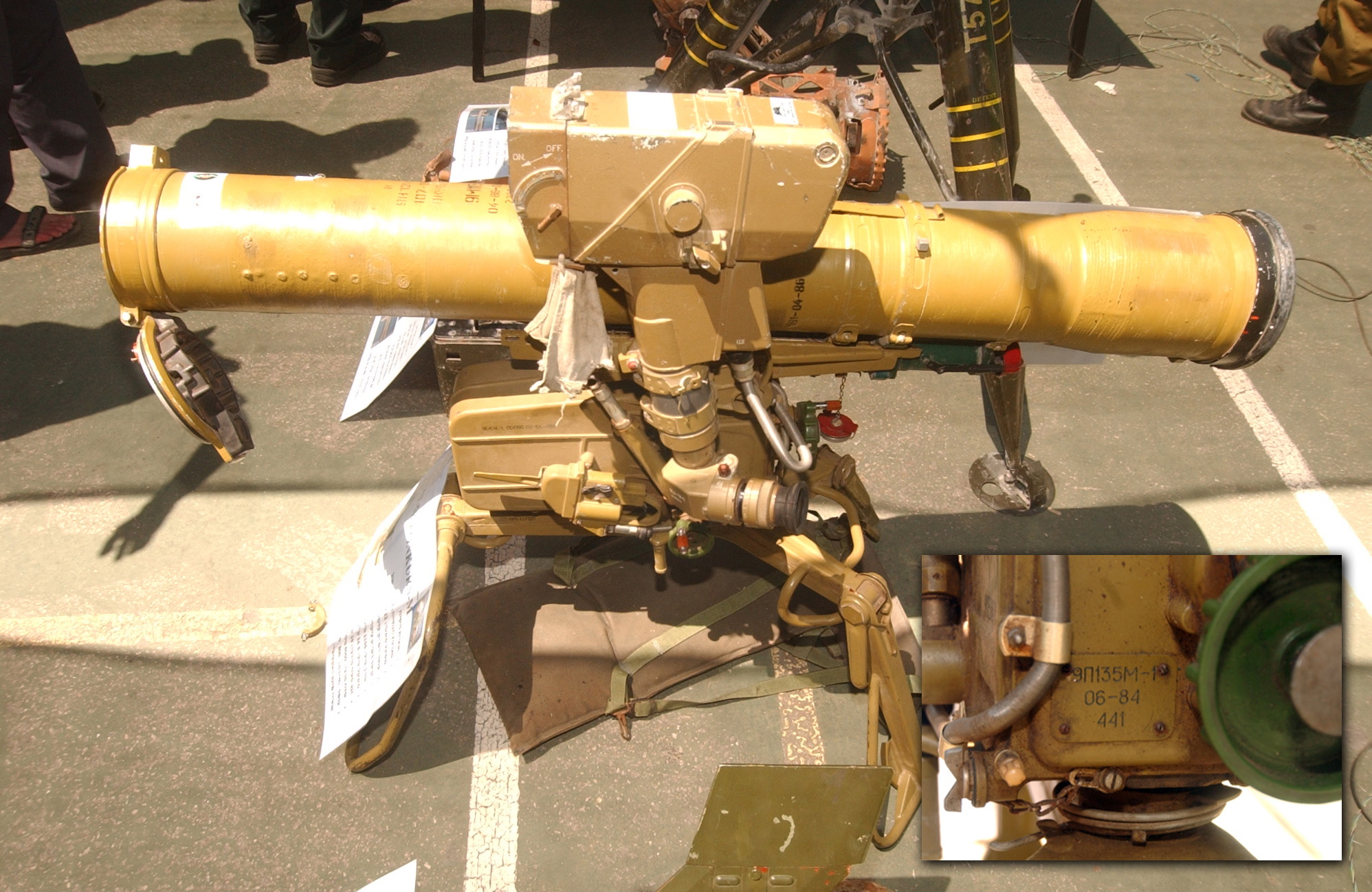
Russian 9K111 Fagot allegedly in the hands of Hezbollah according to the IDF.

The Hezbollah–Russia relationship is of several parameters including an economic partnership, weapon trades and military assistance.

Over the last few years, as part of their strategy to expand their influence in the Middle East, Russia has broadened its involvement in Lebanon, strengthening ties in cultural, economic and military subjects in Beirut. Although Russia's activities in Lebanon are not all related to Hezbollah, its alliance with Hezbollah is substantial and provides Russia with access and power in Lebanon, while benefitting the Lebanese Shia Islamist militant group and political party, Hezbollah. Russia does not recognize Hezbollah to be a terrorist organization.

== Background ==
Hezbollah, formed in 1982 during the Israeli-Lebanese war, emerged as a radical Shiite organization. Its primary objectives have include the eradication of Israel and the establishment of a Shiite state within Lebanon. In its early years Hezbollah operated as a guerrilla and militant organization, in time also began operating as a political party within the Lebanese government, now serving as a legitimate representative of the significant Shiite community in Lebanon. The Islamic Republic of Iran is its principal sponsor, offering substantial financial aid, weaponry, and paramilitary training to support Hezbollah's agenda.

A milestone in Hezbollah–Russia relations was in 2015, when Russian and Hezbollah forces fought together in alliance with the Bashar Assad's forces in Syria. Russian President, Vladimir Putin, then focused largely on his image as “peacemaker”, while Hezbollah welcomed Putin's intervention in Syria since Assad's army and allies including Hezbollah sought help at the time. Moscow's involvement pivoted the course of the war, bolstering Hezbollah and other Iranian proxies, and they have since relied heavily on Russian air cover and diplomatic efforts.

A Hezbollah officer, said in an interview that Russia has been amplifying its backing for his armed movement since 2012. In 2014, Russia's deputy foreign minister, Mikhail Bogdanov, engaged in discussions with Hezbollah's leader Hassan Nasrallah in Beirut to explore regional developments. In a statement, Bogdanov explicitly stated that Russia does not classify the organization as a terrorist group.

== Military ==
A 2016 article based on interviews with a Hezbollah commander discussed the relationship between the Russians and Hezbollah. The article noted a video published in December 2016 presenting a Hezbollah commander stationed in Aleppo confirming that his organization has been working closely with the Russians in Syria's former industrial hub, calling their relationship “better than excellent”. According to the article, Russia places great importance on its alliance with Hezbollah in Syria, acknowledging the Lebanese militia as a capable and trustworthy force on the battlefield. The crucial support provided by Hezbollah has played a significant role in capturing strategic territories, solidifying regime control, and aiding Russian airstrikes. Through this collaboration, Moscow hopes to bring an end to the Syrian conflict by establishing a strong central government in Damascus.

A report from The Daily Beast suggested that Russia is supplying weapons to Hezbollah.

In November 2016, Al-Akhbar, a Lebanese newspaper closely associated with Hezbollah, has reported that the organization recently conducted its first official and direct meeting with senior Russian military officers. The purpose of the meeting was to discuss strategic plans for the final battle in Aleppo. The article pointed out that the Russian officers, who took the initiative to convene the meeting, expressed admiration for Hezbollah's performance during the Battle of Martyr Abu Omar Saraqib. Both parties reached an agreement to maintain ongoing communication channels.

In March 2022, unconfirmed reports from Saudi Arabia and Lebanon suggested that Hezbollah, an Iranian-backed Shiite militant group, may deploy approximately 800 fighters to support Russian forces in Ukraine. Allegedly, this collaboration would grant Hezbollah the opportunity to procure weapons from the Russian defense contractor Almaz-Antey, although the Shiite group has consistently refuted such claims. The plan included sending an initial contingent of 200 Hezbollah operatives to Russia, with additional fighters expected to join them later. Each participant in this arrangement is purportedly set to receive a monthly wage of $1500. The agreement is said to have materialized following a meeting between Naji Hassan al-Shartouni, the head of Hezbollah's security unit, and Alexander Kuznetsov, a Russian official associated with the Wagner Group-a paramilitary organization often referred to as the "private army" of the Russian Defense Ministry.

Reports from Lebanon's Sawt Beirut International website indicate that Hezbollah has established a recruitment office in Al-Qusayr, western Syria, after the meeting between Shartouni and Kuznetsov. Additionally, three more recruitment offices are reportedly slated to open in Aleppo, Yabroud, and Sayyida Zainab, providing Hezbollah members with the opportunity to enlist for the purported Russian mission.

After Russia's 2022 invasion of Ukraine, Russia has strengthened its connections with Iran, the primary supporter of Hezbollah. Sources cited by CNN suggest that Western intelligence indicated an increasing collaboration between Wagner, Russia's paramilitary organization, and Hezbollah in Syria.

During the 2023 conflict in Israel, U.S. intelligence reports indicated that Russia provided air support to Hezbollah for attacks against Israel. Russia's Wagner paramilitary organization reportedly transferred a Pantsir-S1 system to Hezbollah. The Pantsir, known as the SA-22 in NATO terminology, is a self-propelled anti-aircraft gun and missile system developed and manufactured by Russia. Its purpose is to provide point defense against fixed-wing aircraft, helicopters, cruise missiles, and drones.

According to Charles Lister, director of the Syria and Countering Terrorism and Extremism programs at the Middle East Institute in Washington, the Russian military, including its special operations forces, has forged a "highly intimate operational alliance with Hezbollah during the recent years in Syria." Lister notes that this relationship is widely acknowledged and persists.

According to a November 2023 report, Russia maintains enduring military connections with certain Iranian-supported factions in the region. Secretary of State Antony Blinken highlighted During his testimony to Congress the escalating ties between Moscow and Tehran, underscoring their impact on Middle East security. Blinken informed the Senate Appropriations Committee, stating, "Moscow has been providing Iran with progressively advanced military technology, posing a threat to Israel's security."

== Economic ==
Until 2018 the alliance appeared to be limited to military activity. After 2018, there was a shift in the alliance, extending from a military alliance to an economic partnership. A Russian Iranian oil network supporting Hizballah, Hamas and the Syrian government was declared illicit by the US treasury in 2018.

Hezbollah's financial ties with Russia came to light in 2018 when the US Department of the Treasury exposed an elaborate oil-smuggle involving Hezbollah and the Qods Force of Iran's Islamic Revolutionary Guard Corps (IRGC), Generating Hundreds of Millions of Dollars for Qods Force and Hezbollah. The operation allowed the Iranian regime to channel funds to Russia's state-owned Promsyrioimport on behalf of Syria, Benefiting Russia with the opportunity to evade US sanctions against Assad. The Central Bank of Syria transferred the funds to Hezbollah, Hamas and the Quds Force of Iran's Islamic Revolutionary Guard Corps (IRGC). Two central figures that were identified in the operation were Mohammad Kasir, a senior Hezbollah official, and Mohammad Alchewiqi, a Syrian citizen living in Russia. The RUSI article notes that the Russian government was officially involved in this activity.

Since the exposure of this network, the US Treasury Department has imposed sanctions on several individuals involved in this smuggling network and in May 2022. The US Treasury Department imposed additional sanctions on this smuggling network following a discovery that Iran's Islamic Revolutionary Guard Corps was using a company in Russia to transfer millions of dollars from Russia.

In November 2022, the Treasury Department issued sanctions against another network that supported Hezbollah and the Islamic Revolutionary Guard Corps, but did not specify whether the Russian government was also involved in that network. According to the article, these actions harm international efforts to impose a cost on Russia for its invasion of Ukraine in February 2022, and also help two terrorist organizations make money. In March 2021, Hezbollah expanded its ties with Russia through an early diplomatic visit to Moscow. During a three-day stay in Moscow, Hezbollah representatives met with several Russian officers, including Russian Foreign Minister Sergei Lavrov, representatives from the Russian Parliament and Federal Council, and the Iranian ambassador to Russia, Kazem Jalali. During the visit, the participants discussed, among other things, various projects for cooperation. Three months later, the Russian ambassador to Lebanon, Alexander Rudkov in Beirut, held a follow-up meeting with Hezbollah. Hassan Nasrallah had already met with the Russian foreign minister in 2013.

The Lebanese economist, Muklad is considered according to a US Treasuery Department report in January 2023 a financial adviser to Hezbollah and manages business on behalf of the group, represents it in negotiations with investors, partners and foreign government officials. The US Treasury highlighted Muklad's involvement with Russia. Since at least 2021, Muklad has been involved in close ties with Russian officers, attending meetings in Beirut and holding discussions with Bogdanov. He played a role in negotiations for the Russian company Hydro Engineering and Construction to rehabilitate the Zahrani refinery in southern Lebanon, controlled by Hezbollah, a $1.5 billion project. Although the company is owned by Russian businessman Andrei Metzger, it is supported by the Russian government. Reports indicate that Hezbollah's interest in the distillery project was expressed by the Secretary General, Hassan Nasrallah, who criticized the United States for delaying its progress, and hinted that Hezbollah would have accepted the Russian offer much earlier if it had more influence over Lebanese decisions. In addition to promoting deals, the US Treasury revealed Mukald's participation in efforts to help Hezbollah acquire weapons. Collaborating with Hezbollah officer Muhammad Kasir, Mokaled contributed to the group's arms acquisition efforts. Kasir not only managed Hezbollah's financing, but also lead the unit responsible for transferring weapons, technology and support from Syria to Lebanon - now identified as Hezbollah's Unit 4400, which was previously called Unit 108.

== Political ==
Russia stands out as one of the few major countries maintaining active relations with Lebanon's diverse and often opposing political players. In April 2021, Russia hosted Saad Hariri, the prime minister-designate of Lebanon, and a month earlier, they welcomed a delegation from Hezbollah, including Mohammad Raad, the head of the movement's parliamentary bloc. According to the Australian Institute of International Affairs analyst report, the growing influence of Russia in Lebanon has become significant, prompting George Shabaan, the special representative of the prime minister-designate, to express the belief that Moscow could play a role in resolving the political deadlock. Shabaan emphasized Russia's positive connections with all political parties in Lebanon and its relationships with regional actors influencing the country's situation. The Middle East Monitor suggested that Hezbollah and Russia are contemplating the establishment of a party office in Moscow. According to the same source, the Russians perceive Hezbollah not merely as a Lebanese organization but as a party with a presence across various countries in the region.

According to an INSS article, Hezbollah considers Russia's support crucial, as it grants the organization legitimacy within the Lebanese political landscape. Despite being labeled a terrorist organization by an increasing number of countries, encompassing both its political and military factions, Russia's support helps establish Hezbollah as a recognized political actor. Additionally, the group is motivated to enhance Lebanon's connections with non-Western and non-pro-Western entities, such as the Gulf states.

== See also ==
- Hezbollah–Iran relations
- Russia–Hamas relations
