= Dizengoff Center suicide bombing =

1996 terrorist attack in Tel Aviv, Israel

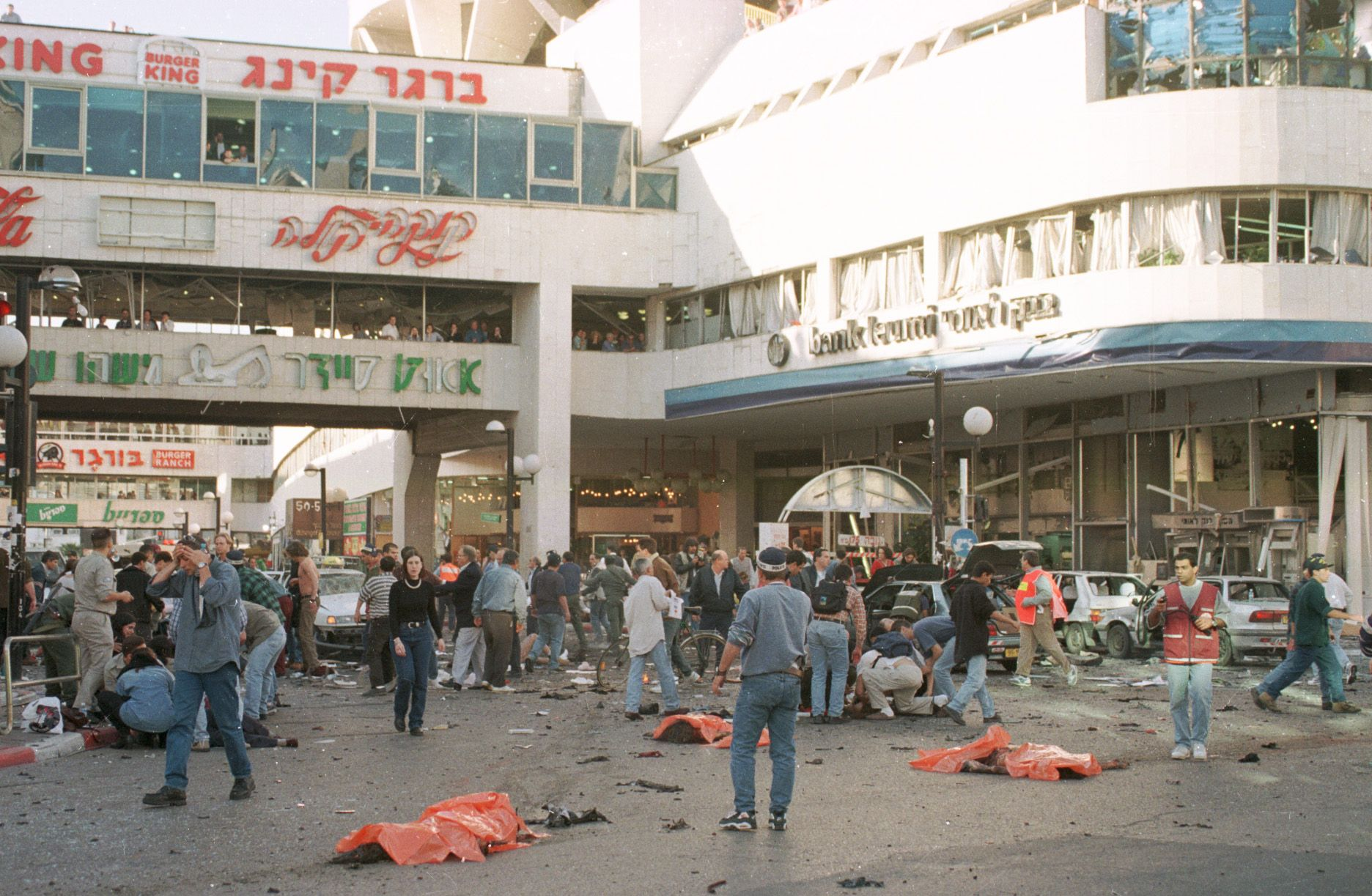
- The mall after the bombing
- Native name: הפיגוע בדיזנגוף סנטר
- Location: 32°04′34″N 34°46′29″E; Tel Aviv, Israel
- Date: March 4, 1996; 30 years ago c. 4:00 pm (GMT+2)
- Target: Dizengoff Center
- Attack type: Suicide bomber
- Weapon: Suicide vest
- Deaths: 14 (including the perpetrator)
- Injuries: 125
- Perpetrator: Hamas
- No. of participants: 1

The Dizengoff Center suicide bombing was a Palestinian suicide terrorist attack which took place on March 4, 1996, on the eve of the Jewish holiday of Purim. The suicide bomber blew himself up outside Dizengoff Center in downtown Tel Aviv, killing 13 Israelis and wounding 130 more. The terrorist attack was the fourth suicide bombing in Israel in nine days, bringing the death toll during that span to over 60.

== Background ==
After the Shin Bet assassinated Hamas military leader Yahya Ayyash on 5 January 1996, Mohammed Deif, who later served as commander of the Qassam Brigades, organized a mass-casualty bombing campaign inside Israel as retaliation, including the Dizengoff Center suicide bombing in Tel Aviv and the two Jaffa Road bus bombings in Jerusalem. These operations were, in their scale, scope and sophistication, different and larger than any attacks of the past, and it has been alleged that both Syria and Iran had helped in their planning and financing. According to a report, Syrian Minister of Defense Mustafa Tlass instructed Ghazi Kanaan, the commander of Syrian forces in Lebanon, to establish links between Hezbollah and Hamas fighters, who were then trained both in Lebanon and in Iran and participated in the retaliatory operations for the murder of Ayyash. According to Mike Kelly, Hamas operative Hassan Salameh, who planned three of the attacks, was trained in Iran. In 2000, families of American victims of the attacks filed a lawsuit against Tlass, Kanaan and Iranian Minister of Intelligence Ali Fallahian.

== The attack ==
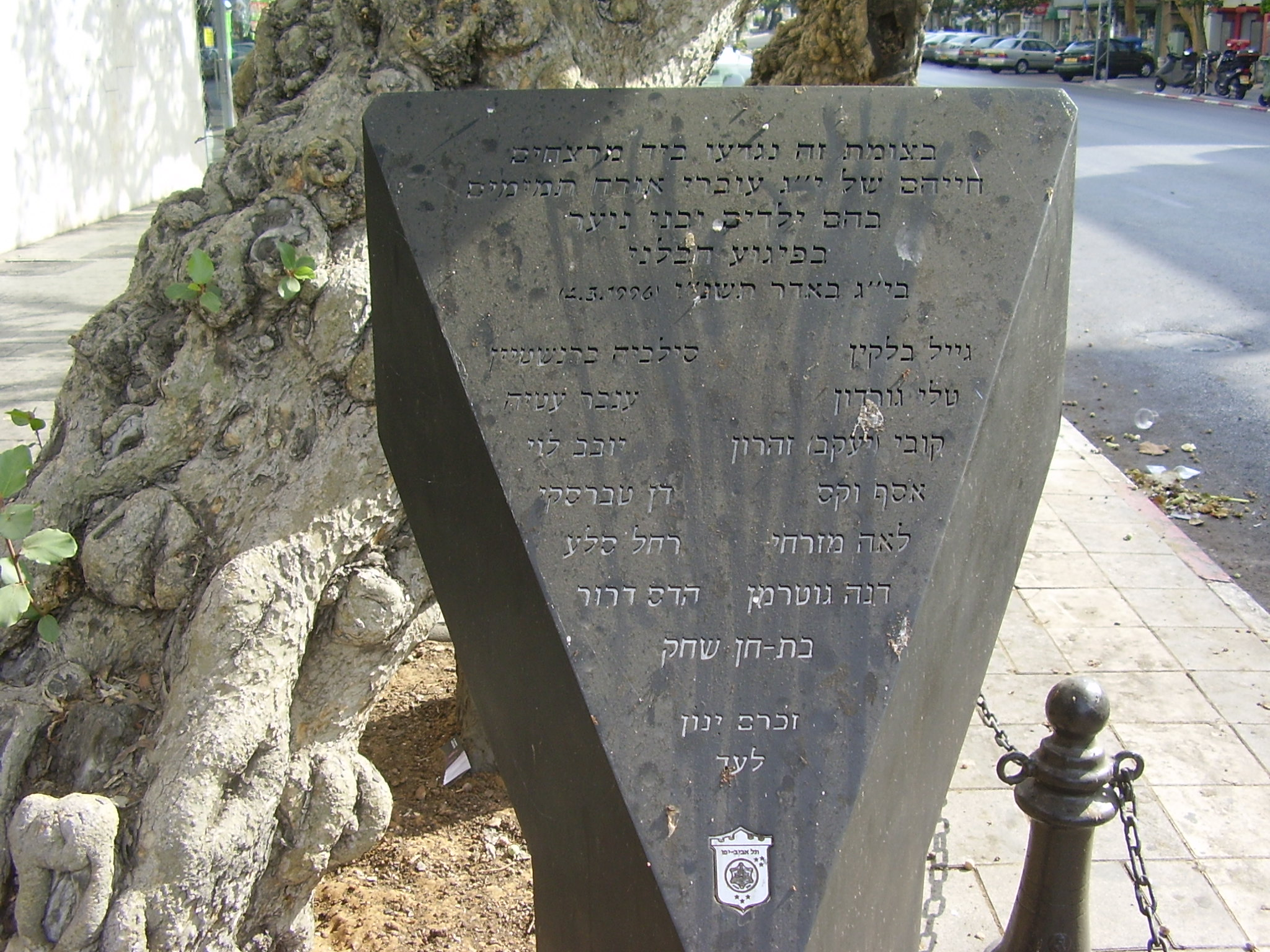
Memorial for the attack victims

The suicide bomber detonated just before 4 pm (GMT+2) outside the Dizengoff Center, the largest shopping mall in Tel Aviv. That day the center was particularly crowded for the eve of Purim. Many in the crowd were children dressed in costume for the holiday. The bomber sought to enter the mall but turned back because of the police presence. Instead, he went into the busy intersection where a large number of pedestrians were crossing the street and set off his 20-kilogram (44 lb) nail bomb. Following the attack, a phone call to an Israeli radio station apparently from a Hamas representative identified the attacker as Abdel-Rahim Ishaq, a 24-year-old resident of Ramallah.
