= Mike Kelly (journalist) =

American journalist

Mike Kelly is a columnist for The Record, a newspaper serving Bergen County, New Jersey.

== Education ==
In 1975, Kelly obtained his degree from Syracuse University with a double major in American studies and Journalism. Later, he took graduate courses at Fordham University and New York University.

== Career ==
Kelly has worked for at The Record newspaper since 1981. Here, he writes three different columns a week on current events. His work focuses on projects in Northern Ireland, Africa, the Middle East, and Malaysia. Prior to working at The Record, Kelly worked as a general assignment news reporter and feature writer.

He frequently appears on area radio programs such as WABC's “John Gambling Show” and on WCBS-News Radio, National Public Radio's "Morning Edition," WNYC radio show, “On The Line,” MSNBC's “Hardball with Chris Matthews,” and on the “CBS Evening News.”

Kelly is also an adjunct professor at Fairleigh Dickinson University's School of Administrative Science.

== Books ==
He is the author of Color Lines: The Troubled Dreams of Racial Harmony in an American Town, a book about the 1990 shooting in Teaneck, New Jersey of Phillip Pannell, an African-American teenager, by Gary Spath, a white Teaneck police officer.

He is also the author of the 2000 book Fresh Jersey Stories from an Altered State.

In 2014 Kelly published The Bus on Jaffa Road about terrorism and the search for justice after terrorist attacks.

== Awards and honors ==
Kelly's work has won him a number of awards which include:

- Top columnist in America in 2004 by the National Association of Newspaper Columnist
- New Jersey Press Association named him “Journalist of the Year” in 2001
- New York Deadline Club prize
- Meyer Berger Award from Columbia University
- National Clarion Award
- 25 area journalists singled out by the New York City Fire Department
- New Jersey Library Association honored him for his columns in defense of the First Amendment in 2008

== Family ==
Kelly is married to his wife Judy and together they have two daughters. Kelly and his wife live in Teaneck, New Jersey.
