= Mansur =

Mansour
- Pronunciation: IPA: [manˈsˤuːr]
- Gender: Male
- Language: Arabic

Origin
- Meaning: 'He who is Victorious'
- Region of origin: Arabia

Other names
- Alternative spelling: Mansur, Mansoor
- Variant forms: Nasir, Nasser, Nasri, Nasrallah, Nasir al-Din Victor, Vincent

Mansour (Arabic: منصور, Manṣūr); also spelled Mansoor, Monsoor, Mansur or Mensur is a male Arabic name that means "He who is victorious", from the Arabic root naṣr (نصر), meaning "victory."

The first known bearer of the name was Mansur ibn Sarjun, Byzantine governor of Damascus in the late 500s and early 600s, who surrendered the city to the Muslims in 635.

Other people called Mansur include, during the golden Age of Islam:

- Al-Mansur (714–775), second Abbasid caliph and the founder of Baghdad.
- Ismail al-Mansur (914–953), third ruler of the Fatimid dynasty ruled from 946 to 953.
- Mansur Al-Hallaj (858–922), Persian mystic, writer, and teacher of Sufism
- Almanzor (938–1002), 10th-century ruler of al-Andalus
- Mansur ibn Ilyas, Timurid physician
- Mansur Khan (Moghul Khan) (1482/83–1543), a khan of Moghulistan
- Mansur Shah of Malacca (died 1477), a sultan of Malacca
- Mansur I of Samanid (died 976), amir of the Samanids
- Mansur II of Samanid (died 999), amir of the Samanids
- Mansur ad-Din of Adal (died 1424), 15th-century sultan of Adal.
- Mansour Zalzal, Iranian musician during the Abbasid period

== Imams of Yemen ==
- Al-Mansur Yahya (died 976)
- Al-Mansur Abdallah (1166–1217)
- Al-Mansur al-Hasan (1199–1271)
- Al-Mansur an-Nasir (died 1462)
- Al-Mansur Muhammad, Imam of Yemen (1441–1505)
- Al-Mansur al-Husayn (1669–1720)
- Al-Mansur Ali I (1738–1809)
- Al-Mansur Ahmad (died 1853)
- Al-Mansur Ali II, Imam of Yemen (1812–1871)
- Al-Mansur al-Husayn III (died 1888)

== Modern given name ==
Mansur or Mansour is used in Turkic languages, Iranian languages and Arabic, while the transliteration Mansoor is typically used by South Asians, and Mensur is used in the Bosnian language.

=== Mansur ===
- Mansur Yavaş (born 1955), Turkish politician and the mayor of Ankara
- Sheikh Mansur (1760–1794), Chechen leader against Catherine the Great's Russia
- Mansur Mozaffarov (1902–1966), Russian Tatar composer and pedagogue
- Mansur Abdulin (1923–2007), Soviet memoirist and soldier

=== Mensur ===
- Mensur Akgün, Turkish scholar
- Mensur Bajramović (born 1965), Bosnian basketball coach
- Mensur Suljović (born 1972), professional darts player
- Mensur Kurtiši (born 1986), Macedonian association football player

=== Mansoor ===
- Mansoor Abdullah, Singaporean murderer
- Mansoor Ali Khan Pataudi (1941–2011), Indian cricketer
- Mansoor Al-Shehail (born 1995), Saudi Arabian wrestler
- Mansoor Ahmed (1968–2018), Pakistani hockey player
- Mansoor Akhtar (born 1957), Pakistani cricketer
- Mansoor Amjad (born 1987), Pakistani cricketer
- Mansoor Delane (born 2003), American football player
- Mansoor Hekmat (1951–2002), Iranian political theorist and activist
- Mansoor Ijaz (born 1961), American commentator and businessman
- Mansoor Muhammed Ali Qattaa, Saudi Arabian held in detention by the United States at Guantanamo Bay
- Mansoor Khan (born 1958), Pakistani film maker
- Mullah Bakht Mohammed (1972–2015), Afghanistan Taliban military commander known as Mansoor Dadullah
- Mansoor Muftah (born 1955), Qatari football player
- Mansoor Zaman (born 1980), Pakistani squash player

=== Mansour ===
- Mansour (singer) (born 1971), Iranian singer
- Mansour Abbas (born 1974), Arab-Israeli politician
- Mansour F. Armaly (1927–2005), Palestinian-American physician and researcher
- Mansour al-Balawi (born 1964), Saudi Arabian businessman
- Mansour Bahrami (born 1956), Iranian tennis player
- Mansour el-Essawi (1937–2023), Egyptian politician
- Mansour Hassan (1937–2012), Egyptian politician
- Mansour Leghaei (born 1962), Iranian Shia imam
- Mansour Matloubi (born 1952), Iranian poker player
- Mansour Moalla (born 1930), Tunisian economist and politician
- Mansour bin Zayed Al Nahyan (born 1970), member of the ruling family of Abu Dhabi
- Mansour Nariman (1935–2015), Iranian oud player and composer
- Mansour Osanlou, Iranian trade unionist
- Mansour Rahbani (1925–2009), Lebanese composer, musician, and producer
- Mansour Rouhani (1922–1979), Iranian politician
- Mansour bin Abdulaziz Al Saud (1921–1951), Saudi royal and politician
- Mansour bin Mutaib Al Saud (born 1952), Saudi royal and politician
- Mansour bin Muqrin Al Saud (1974–2017), Saudi royal
- Mansour bin Nasser Al Saud (born 1959), Saudi royal
- Mansour bin Saud Al Saud (born 1946), Saudi royal and businessman
- Mansour Seck (1955–2024), Senegalese singer and musician
- Mansour Al-Thagafi (born 1979), Saudi Arabian footballer

=== Similar ===
- Almanzo Wilder (1859–1949), American farmer, whose first name is a form of al-Manṣūr.
- Mansurul Haq (1937–2018), Pakistani admiral and Chief of Naval Staff of the Pakistan Navy
- Mancur Olson (1932–1998), American economist and political scientist
- Mansyur S. (born 1948), Indonesian singer

== Middle name ==
- Abdrabbuh Mansur Hadi (born 1945), Yemeni politician

== Surname ==
=== Mansour ===
- Adly Mansour (born 1945), Egyptian politician and acting President in 2014
- Adnan Mansour (born 1946), Lebanese diplomat and politician
- Agnes Mary Mansour (1931–2004), American political figure and former nun
- Ahmed Subhy Mansour (born 1949), Egyptian cleric, founder of the Quranist group
- Akhtar Mohammad Mansour (1968–2016), leader of the Taliban, in Afghanistan
- Amal Mansour (1950–2018), Palestinian-Jordanian author and translator
- Amir Mansour (born 1972), American professional boxer
- Camille Mansour (born 1945), Palestinian academic
- Eli Mansour (born 1968), American rabbi, author/writer
- Gueye Mansour (born 1985), Senegalese footballer
- Hend Al-Mansour (born 1956), Saudi Arabian-American artist
- Josh Mansour (born 1990), Australian Rugby League player
- Joyce Mansour (1928–1986), British born Egyptian Surrealist poet who also wrote in French
- Mustafa Mansour (1914–2002), Egyptian footballer
- Ramadan Abdel Rehim Mansour (1980–2010), Egyptian street gang leader and serial killer
- Reda Mansour (born 1965), Israeli writer, historian and diplomat
- Richard Mansour (1937–2019), better known as Dick Dale, Lebanese-American guitarist
- Shadia Mansour (born 1985), British born Palestinian singer
- Sliman Mansour (born 1947), Palestinian painter
- Toufik Mansour (born 1968), Israeli mathematician

=== Mansoor ===
- Belal Mansoor Ali (born 1988), Bahraini runner from Kenya
- Ghulam Mansoor (1812–??), Subedar major, Bhopal state
- M. A. Mansoor (1881–1968), Egyptian antiquarian
- Maghfoor Mansoor (1966–2001), Pakistani native who was a fugitive in the United States
- Misha Mansoor (born 1984), American musician and founder of the Progressive Metal band Periphery
- Peter Mansoor (born 1960), Palestinian American Army colonel, executive officer to Gen. Petraeus during Iraq War troop surge of 2007
- Shoaib Mansoor (born 1951), Pakistani film producer, director, writer, lyricist, and composer

=== Mansur ===
- Ali Mansur (1886–1974), prime minister of Iran
- Hassan-Ali Mansur (1923–1965), Iranian politician and prime minister
- João Mansur (1923–2012), Brazilian politician and governor of Lebanese descent
- Jossy Mansur (1934–2016), Aruban newspaper editor of Lebanese descent
- Mallikarjun Mansur (1910–1992), Indian classical singer
- Muhammad Mansur Ali (1917–1975), Bangladeshi politician and prime minister
- Pattie Mansur, American politician
- Sheikh Mukhtar Robow (born 1969), leader and spokesman for Somalia's al-Shabaab known as Abu Mansur
- Ustad Mansur (died 1624), Mughal painter from India

=== Similar ===
- Michael A. Monsoor (1981–2006), United States Navy SEAL and Medal of Honor recipient

== See also ==
- Al-Mansur (disambiguation)
- Manzur, a similar sounding yet unrelated name
- Mansura (disambiguation)
- Mansurnagar Union
