= Nasri =

- Gender: Masculine
- Language: Arabic: نصري

Origin
- Meaning: Support, victory

Other names
- Alternative spelling: Nasry
- Related names: Nacer, Naseer, Nasir, Nasr, Nasrallah, Nasser, Nassar

Nasri (Arabic: نصري, lit. 'support, victory', pronounced [nasˤriː]) or Nasry is a masculine given name and surname, commonly found in the Arabic language. People with this name include:

== Given name ==
- Nasri (musician) (born 1981), Canadian singer-songwriter and producer
- Nasri (Saint Ignatius Elias III) (1867–1932), 119th Patriarch of the Universal Syriac Orthodox Church
- Nasri Atallah (born 1982), Lebanese-British author, publisher and talent manager
- Nasri Cheppy (1950–2010), Indonesian film director
- Nasri Maalouf (1911–2005), Lebanese politician
- Nasri Shamseddine (1927–1983), Lebanese singer and act
- Nasry Asfura (born 1958), president of Honduras (2026–)

== Middle name ==
- Makram Nasri Kaiser (1930–1996), Egyptian scientist, biologist, medical and veterinary acarologist, leading authority on ticks of the genus Hyalomma

== Surname ==
- Ahmed Nasri, President of Fahd bin Sultan University
- Assala Nasri (born 1969), Syrian singer
- Maya Nasri (born 1976), Lebanese actress and singer
- Neophytos Nasri (1670–1731), bishop of Saidnaya of the Melkite Greek Catholic Church who took a pre-eminent part in the 1724 split of the Melkite Church
- Noura Nasri, Tunisian shooter and Olympian
- Samir Nasri (born 1987), French footballer
- Yousef El Nasri (born 1979), Spanish long-distance runner of Moroccan origin
- Nisha Patel-Nasri (1977–2006), British business owner and special constable, murder victim
- Mohamed Ben Riadh Nasri, one of the Tunisian detainees at Guantanamo Bay

== See also ==
- Nasri, Iran, village in Hormozgan Province
- Nasrid dynasty, the last Muslim dynasty in Spain
- Al-Nasr (disambiguation)
- Nasr (disambiguation)
- Nasser (disambiguation)
