= Naser =

Naser may refer to:

== Places ==
- Naser, German name for Nežárka, a river in the Czech Republic
- Nahr-e Naser, a village in Khuzestan Province, Iran
- Kalateh-ye Naser, a village in South Khorasan Province, Iran
- Ansar, Nabatieh, old name for this Lebanese village

== Other ==
- Naser (name), name list
- Salwa Eid Naser (born 1998), Bahraini track sprinter
- Al Naser Sporting Club, a Kuwaiti professional football club

== See also ==
- Nasr (disambiguation)
- Nasser (disambiguation)
- Nassar, Naseer, Nasir, alternative transliterations of the name
