= Nasser (name) =

- Romanization: Nāṣir
- Gender: masculine
- Language: Arabic: ناصر

Origin
- Language: Arabic
- Meaning: 'granter of victory', helper, protector, supporter, victory-maker

Other names
- Alternative spelling: Naser, Nassar, Nasir, Naseer, Nacer,
- Related names: Nasrallah, Nasralla, Nasrollah, Nasrullah, Al-Nasrallah, Nasr Nasri

Nasser (Arabic: ناصر, romanized: Nāṣir, lit. 'granter of victory') is a masculine given name, commonly found in Arabic. Alternative spellings of this name, possibly due to transliteration, include Naser, Nassar, Nasir, Naseer, or Nacer. People with this name may include:

== Given name ==
- Nassar (born 1958), Tamil actor and director, sometimes spelled Nasser
- Nasser al-Bahri (1972–2015), Al Qaeda militant
- Nasser Beydoun (born 1964/65), American business executive
- Nasser Biria (1958–2025), Iranian Shi'a cleric
- Nasser Eljahori, Yemeni army officer
- Nasser Fahimi (born 1974), political and ideological prisoner from Iran
- Nasser Abu Hamid (1972–2022), Palestinian politician
- Nasser Hussain (born 1968), former England cricket captain
- Nasser Judeh (born 1961) Jordanian politician
- Nasser Kanaani (born 1970), Iranian diplomat
- Nasser bin Hamad Al Khalifa (born 1987), Bahraini royal (also referred to as Sheikh Nasser or Prince Nasser)
- Nasser Khalili (born 1945), British-Iranian collector, scholar and philanthropist
- Nasser Al-Khelaifi (born 1973), Qatari businessman
- Nasser Mansour Hadi (born 1947), Yemeni general
- Nasser Minachi (1931–2014), Iranian politician
- Nasser bin Zayed Al Nahyan (died 2008), Emirati royal
- Nasser Ovissi (born 1934), Iranian-born American painter
- Nasser Al Qasabi (born 1961), Saudi Arabian actor
- Nasser Al Saeed (1923–??), Saudi Arabian missing dissident since 1979
- Nasser Saidi (born 1950), Lebanese politician and economist
- Nasser bin Abdulaziz Al Saud (1911–1984), Saudi royal
- Nasser Al-Shamrani (born 1983), Saudi Arabian footballer
- Nasser Sobbi (1924–2018), Iranian-American Mandaean scribe
- Nasser El Sonbaty (1965–2013), German bodybuilder
- Nasser Taghvai (1941–2025), Iranian film director and screenwriter
- Nasser Yeganeh (1921–1993), Iranian jurist and politician

== Middle name/father name ==
- Abdul Nasser El Hakim (born 1960), Lebanese-born Curaçaoan businessman, politician, minister and a founder of the political party Movement for the Future of Curaçao (MFK)
- Amal Nasser el-Din, (1928–2025), Druze Israeli author and former politician, former MP in the Knesset (Israeli Parliament)
- Ammar Abadah Nasser al-Wa'eli (1977–2011), Yemeni wanted for terrorism by the FBI
- Bashir Ali Nasser al-Sharari (born 1970), Yemeni who became briefly wanted in 2002, by the United States Department of Justice's FBI in connection with terrorism
- Fadel Nasser Sarouf, (born Valentin Sarov) (born 1976), Bulgarian-Qatari weightlifter
- Hussein ibn Nasser (1902–1982), Prime Minister of Jordan from 1963 to 1964
- Hussein Nasser Al-Huraiti (born 1962), Kuwaiti politician and MP in its National Assembly
- Hussein Nasser Walji (1920–2005), Tanzanian politician
- Mansour Nasser al Bihani (died 2007), Yemeni fighter who died in Somalia in 2011
- Mohammed Nasser Ahmed (born 1950), Yemeni major general and government minister

== Surname ==
- Abdelkarim Hussein Mohamed Al-Nasser, alleged terrorist from Saudi Arabia
- Amin H. Nasser (born 1960), Saudi Arabian engineer
- Farah Nasser, Canadian journalist
- Fredy Nasser (born 1956), Honduran businessman
- Gamal Abdel Nasser (1918-1970), President of Egypt from 1956 to 1970
- Hana Nasser (born 1991), Israeli football player
- Hanna Nasser (1936–2015), Palestinian politician
- Hanna Nasser (academic) (born 1935), Palestinian academic and political figure
- Jacques Nasser (born 1947), former CEO of Ford Motor Company
- Jim Nasser, American politician
- Jorge Nasser (born 1956), Uruguayan musician
- Larry Nassar (born 1963), former US gymnastics osteopathic physician who sexually abused and raped over 70 women in his career
- Latif Nasser (born 1986), American Canadian writer

== See also ==
- Nasser (disambiguation)
- Gamal Abdel Nasser (disambiguation)
