= Abu Ghizlan =

Abu Ghizlan ابوغزلان
- Village
- Location within Iran
- Coordinates: 30°07′00″N 48°25′54″E
- Country: Iran
- Province: Khuzestan
- County: Abadan
- Bakhsh: Arvandkenar
- Rural District: Minubar

Population (2006)
  - Total: 475
- Time zone: UTC+3:30 (IRST)
  - Summer (DST): UTC+4:30 (IRDT)

Abu Ghizlan (Persian: ابوغزلان, also Romanized as Abū Ghizlān) is a village in Minubar Rural District, Arvandkenar District, Abadan County, Khuzestan Province, Iran. At the 2006 census, its population was 475, in 82 families.
