= Abu Direh =

Abu Direh ابوديره
- Village
- Location within Iran
- Coordinates: 30°06′42″N 48°25′51″E
- Country: Iran
- Province: Khuzestan
- County: Abadan
- Bakhsh: Arvandkenar
- Rural District: Minubar

Population (2006)
  - Total: 1,626
- Time zone: UTC+3:30 (IRST)
  - Summer (DST): UTC+4:30 (IRDT)

Abu Direh (Persian: ابوديره, also Romanized as Abū Dīreh; also known as ‘Ali Dāhir and ‘Alī Z̧āher) is a village in Minubar Rural District, Arvandkenar District, Abadan County, Khuzestan Province, Iran. At the 2006 census, its population was 1,626, in 294 families.
