= Rafi, Abadan =

Rafi رفيع
- Village
- Location within Iran
- Coordinates: 30°00′00″N 48°30′00″E
- Country: Iran
- Province: Khuzestan
- County: Abadan
- Bakhsh: Arvandkenar
- Rural District: Nasar

Population (2006)
  - Total: 193
- Time zone: UTC+3:30 (IRST)
  - Summer (DST): UTC+4:30 (IRDT)

Rafi (Persian: رفيع, also Romanized as Rafī‘) is a village in Nasar Rural District, Arvandkenar District, Abadan County, Khuzestan Province, Iran. At the 2006 census, its population was 193, in 40 families.
