= Abu Sadreyn =

Abu Sadreyn ابوصدرين
- Village
- Location within Iran
- Coordinates: 30°02′00″N 48°28′11″E
- Country: Iran
- Province: Khuzestan
- County: Abadan
- Bakhsh: Arvandkenar
- Rural District: Nasar

Population (2006)
  - Total: 215
- Time zone: UTC+3:30 (IRST)
  - Summer (DST): UTC+4:30 (IRDT)

Abu Sadreyn (Persian: ابوصدرين, also Romanized as Abū Şadreyn; also known as Farāzān and Rūstā-ye Abū Şadreyn) is a village in Nasar Rural District, Arvandkenar District, Abadan County, Khuzestan Province, Iran. At the 2006 census, its population was 215, in 48 families.
