= Abu Shakar =

Abu Shakar ابوشكر
- Village
- Location within Iran
- Coordinates: 30°08′00″N 48°25′00″E
- Country: Iran
- Province: Khuzestan
- County: Abadan
- Bakhsh: Arvandkenar
- Rural District: Minubar

Population (2006)
  - Total: 872
- Time zone: UTC+3:30 (IRST)
  - Summer (DST): UTC+4:30 (IRDT)

Abu Shakar (Persian: ابوشكر, also Romanized as Abū Shakar) is a village in Minubar Rural District, Arvandkenar District, Abadan County, Khuzestan Province, Iran. At the 2006 census, its population was 872, in 183 families.
