= Nahr-e Seyyed Yusef =

Village in Khuzestan, Iran

Nahr-e Seyyed Yusef نهرسيديوسف
- Village
- Location within Iran
- Coordinates: 30°03′00″N 48°27′00″E
- Country: Iran
- Province: Khuzestan
- County: Abadan
- Bakhsh: Arvandkenar
- Rural District: Nasar

Population (2006)
  - Total: 132
- Time zone: UTC+3:30 (IRST)
  - Summer (DST): UTC+4:30 (IRDT)

Nahr-e Seyyed Yusef (Persian: نهرسيديوسف, also Romanized as Nahr-e Seyyed Yūsef; also known as Seyyed Yūsef) is a village in Nasar Rural District, Arvandkenar District, Abadan County, Khuzestan Province, Iran. At the 2006 census, its population was 132, in 24 families.
