= Farrokh Pey =

Farrokh Pey فرخ پي
- Village
- Location within Iran
- Coordinates: 30°00′00″N 48°29′00″E
- Country: Iran
- Province: Khuzestan
- County: Abadan
- Bakhsh: Arvandkenar
- Rural District: Nasar

Population (2006)
  - Total: 523
- Time zone: UTC+3:30 (IRST)
  - Summer (DST): UTC+4:30 (IRDT)

Farrokh Pey (Persian: فرخ پي; also known as Sa‘dūnī) is a village in Nasar Rural District, Arvandkenar District, Abadan County, Khuzestan Province, Iran. At the 2006 census, its population was 523, in 97 families.
