= Sabzan =

Sabzan (Persian: سبزان) may refer to:

- Sabzan, Kerman
- Sabzan, Khuzestan
- Sabzan, Lorestan
