= Nahr-e Mohoseyn =

Nahr-e Mohoseyn نهرمحيسن
- Village
- Country: Iran
- Province: Khuzestan
- County: Abadan
- Bakhsh: Arvandkenar
- Rural District: Nasar

Population (2006)
  - Total: 30
- Time zone: UTC+3:30 (IRST)
  - Summer (DST): UTC+4:30 (IRDT)

Nahr-e Mohoseyn (Persian: نهرمحيسن, also Romanized as Nahr-e Moḩoseyn) is a village in Nasar Rural District, Arvandkenar District, Abadan County, Khuzestan Province, Iran. At the 2006 census, its population was 30, in 7 families.
