= Nahr-e Abu Shanak =

Nahr-e Abu Shanak نهرابوشانك
- Village
- Location within Iran
- Coordinates: 30°02′00″N 48°28′00″E
- Country: Iran
- Province: Khuzestan
- County: Abadan
- Bakhsh: Arvandkenar
- Rural District: Nasar

Population (2006)
  - Total: 266
- Time zone: UTC+3:30 (IRST)
  - Summer (DST): UTC+4:30 (IRDT)

Nahr-e Abu Shanak (Persian: نهرابوشانك, also Romanized as Nahr-e Abū Shānak; also known as Abū Shānak) is a village in Nasar Rural District, Arvandkenar District, Abadan County, Khuzestan Province, Iran. At the 2006 census, its population was 266, in 51 families.
