= Nahr-e Mochri =

Nahr-e Mochri نهرمچري
- Village
- Location within Iran
- Coordinates: 29°58′23″N 48°31′55″E
- Country: Iran
- Province: Khuzestan
- County: Abadan
- Bakhsh: Arvandkenar
- Rural District: Nasar

Population (2006)
  - Total: 342
- Time zone: UTC+3:30 (IRST)
  - Summer (DST): UTC+4:30 (IRDT)

Nahr-e Mochri (Persian: نهرمچري, also Romanized as Nahr-e Mochrī) is a village in Nasar Rural District, Arvandkenar District, Abadan County, Khuzestan Province, Iran. At the 2006 census, its population was 342, in 72 families.
