= Nahr-e Abu Azim =

Nahr-e Abu Azim نهرابوعظيم
- Village
- Location within Iran
- Coordinates: 30°00′00″N 48°29′00″E
- Country: Iran
- Province: Khuzestan
- County: Abadan
- Bakhsh: Arvandkenar
- Rural District: Nasar

Population (2006)
  - Total: 308
- Time zone: UTC+3:30 (IRST)
  - Summer (DST): UTC+4:30 (IRDT)

Nahr-e Abu Azim (Persian: نهرابوعظيم, also Romanized as Nahr-e Abū ‘Aẕīm; also known as Abū ‘Aẕīm) is a village in Nasar Rural District, Arvandkenar District, Abadan County, Khuzestan Province, Iran. At the 2006 census, its population was 308, in 48 families.
