= Padegan-e Khosrowabad =

Coordinates: 30°10′21″N 48°25′14″E

Padegan-e Khosrowabad پادگان خسرواباد
- Village
- Interactive map of Padegan-e Khosrowabad
- Country: Iran
- Province: Khuzestan
- County: Abadan
- Bakhsh: Arvandkenar
- Rural District: Minubar

Population (2006)
  - Total: 165
- Time zone: UTC+3:30 (IRST)
  - Summer (DST): UTC+4:30 (IRDT)

Padegan-e Khosrowabad (Persian: پادگان خسرواباد, also Romanized as Pādegān Khosrowābād; also known as Gārdseāḥlī) is a village in Minubar Rural District, Arvandkenar District, Abadan County, Khuzestan Province, Iran. At the 2006 census, its population was 165, in 50 families.
