= Khazalabad =

Khazalabad خزعل اباد
- Village
- Location within Iran
- Coordinates: 30°08′42″N 48°24′14″E
- Country: Iran
- Province: Khuzestan
- County: Abadan
- Bakhsh: Arvandkenar
- Rural District: Minubar

Population (2006)
  - Total: 612
- Time zone: UTC+3:30 (IRST)
  - Summer (DST): UTC+4:30 (IRDT)

Khazalabad (Persian: خزعل اباد, also Romanized as Khaz‘alābād; also known as Bahmanbār) is a village in Minubar Rural District, Arvandkenar District, Abadan County, Khuzestan Province, Iran. At the 2006 census, its population was 612, in 128 families.
