= Nahr-e Tolayeb =

Nahr-e Tolayeb نهرطليب
- Village
- Location within Iran
- Coordinates: 29°59′50″N 48°30′21″E
- Country: Iran
- Province: Khuzestan
- County: Abadan
- Bakhsh: Arvandkenar
- Rural District: Nasar

Population (2006)
  - Total: 230
- Time zone: UTC+3:30 (IRST)
  - Summer (DST): UTC+4:30 (IRDT)

Nahr-e Tolayeb (Persian: نهرطليب, also Romanized as Nahr-e Tolayeb and Nahr-e Ţalayeb) is a village in Nasar Rural District, Arvandkenar District, Abadan County, Khuzestan Province, Iran. At the 2006 census, its population was 230, in 43 families.
