= Nassar =

- Romanization: Naṣṣār
- Gender: masculine
- Language: Arabic: نصار

Origin
- Language: Arabic
- Meaning: 'granter of victory', helper, protector, supporter, victory-maker

Other names
- Alternative spelling: Naser, Nasser, Nasir, Naseer, Nacer
- Related names: Nasrallah, Nasralla, Nasrollah, Nasrullah, Al-Nasrallah, Nasri

Nassar (Arabic: نصار, lit. 'helper, protector, supporter, victory-maker'), is a given name and surname, commonly found in the Arabic language. Alternative spellings of this name, possibly due to transliteration include Naser, Nasser, Nasir, Naseer, or Nacer. People with the surname include:

== People with the given name Nassar ==
- Nassar (actor) (born 1958) born as M. Nassar, Indian film actor, director and producer
- Nassar Al-Otaibi, Kuwaiti taekwondo practitioner
- Nassar Mansour (born 1967), Arab calligrapher
- Nassar Nassar (born 1992), Lebanese footballer

== People with the surname Nassar ==
- Ali Nassar (born 1954), Arab-Israeli film director
- Azmi Nassar (1957–2007), Arab-Israeli football manager and served as manager of the Palestinian national football team
- Elias Nassar (born 1960), eparch of the Maronite Catholic Eparchy of Sidon
- Eugene Paul Nassar (1935–2017), Professor of English
- Fu'ad Nassar (1914–1976), Palestinian communist leader
- George Nassar (1932–2018), American murderer
- Issam Nassar, Palestinian historian of photography in Palestine and the Middle East
- Jamal Nassar, Palestinian American academic and professor of Social and Behavioral Sciences
- Larry Nassar (born 1963), Disgraced former USA Gymnastics and Michigan State University doctor who pleaded guilty to sexually assaulting multiple female US gymnasts
- Maya Nassar (born 1986), Dutch-Lebanese competitive fitness model, TV host and entrepreneur
- Nadim Nassar (born 1964), Syrian-born church clergy, reverend, Christian film director and co-founder of the Awareness Foundation
- Najib Nassar (1865–1947), Palestinian journalist
- Nassar Nassar (born 1992), Lebanese footballer
- Nassib Nassar, American computer scientist and classical pianist
- Nasif al-Nassar (died 1781), sheikh of the rural Shia Muslim (Matawilah) tribes of Jabal Amil (modern-day South Lebanon)
- Nelida Nassar, Lebanese-American designer and art critic
- Pablo Nassar (born 1977), Costa Rican football player
- Raduan Nassar (born 1935), Brazilian writer of Lebanese descent
- Samar Nassar (born 1978), Jordanian swimmer
- Siraj Nassar (born 1990), Arab-Israeli football player
- Wa'el Nassar (1973–2004), member and a senior leader of the Izz ad-Din al-Qassam Brigades
- Zakiya Nassar (born 1987), Palestinian Olympic swimmer

== See also ==
- Ghaleb Nassar Al Bihani (born 1980), Yemeni citizen held in the Guantanamo Bay detention camp
- Napoleón Nassar Herrera, Honduran military officer
- Tolfiq Nassar Ahmed Al Bihani (born 1972), Saudi Arabian citizen held in the Guantanamo Bay detention camp
- Nassa (disambiguation)
- Nasser (disambiguation)
- Nassau
