= Nahr-e Sen =

Nahr-e Sen نهرسن
- Village
- Location within Iran
- Coordinates: 30°01′22″N 48°29′35″E
- Country: Iran
- Province: Khuzestan
- County: Abadan
- Bakhsh: Arvandkenar
- Rural District: Nasar

Population (2006)
  - Total: 321
- Time zone: UTC+3:30 (IRST)
  - Summer (DST): UTC+4:30 (IRDT)

Nahr-e Sen (Persian: نهرسن; also known as Golshān, Rūstā-ye Sen, and Sen) is a village in Nasar Rural District, Arvandkenar District, Abadan County, Khuzestan Province, Iran. At the 2006 census, its population was 321, in 74 families.
