= Bachachereh-ye Olya =

Bachachereh-ye Olya بچاچره عليا
- Village
- Location within Iran
- Coordinates: 29°58′33″N 48°35′55″E
- Country: Iran
- Province: Khuzestan
- County: Abadan
- Bakhsh: Arvandkenar
- Rural District: Noabad

Population (2006)
  - Total: 32
- Time zone: UTC+3:30 (IRST)
  - Summer (DST): UTC+4:30 (IRDT)

Bachachereh-ye Olya (Persian: بچاچره عليا, also Romanized as Bachāchereh-ye ‘Olyā; also known as Bachāchereh and Nahr-e Bachāchereh) is a village in Noabad Rural District, Arvandkenar District, Abadan County, Khuzestan Province, Iran. At the 2006 census, its population was 32, in 5 families.
