= Nahr-e Afadeleh =

Nahr-e Afadeleh نهرعفادله
- Village
- Country: Iran
- Province: Khuzestan
- County: Abadan
- Bakhsh: Arvandkenar
- Rural District: Minubar

Population (2006)
  - Total: 375
- Time zone: UTC+3:30 (IRST)
  - Summer (DST): UTC+4:30 (IRDT)

Nahr-e Afadeleh (Persian: نهرعفادله, also Romanized as Nahr-e ʿAfādeleh) is a village in Minubar Rural District, Arvandkenar District, Abadan County, Khuzestan Province, Iran. At the 2006 census, its population was 375, in 64 families.
