= Abu Arazeh =

Abu Arazeh ابوعراضه
- Village
- Country: Iran
- Province: Khuzestan
- County: Abadan
- Bakhsh: Arvandkenar
- Rural District: Nasar

Population (2006)
  - Total: 95
- Time zone: UTC+3:30 (IRST)
  - Summer (DST): UTC+4:30 (IRDT)

Abu Arazeh (Persian: ابوعراضه, also Romanized as Abū ʿArāz̤eh) is a village in Nasar Rural District, Arvandkenar District, Abadan County, Khuzestan Province, Iran. At the 2006 census, its population was 95, in 14 families.
