= Naqsheh-ye Nasar =

Naqsheh-ye Nasar نقشه نصار
- Village
- Location within Iran
- Coordinates: 30°03′00″N 48°27′00″E
- Country: Iran
- Province: Khuzestan
- County: Abadan
- Bakhsh: Arvandkenar
- Rural District: Nasar

Population (2006)
  - Total: 96
- Time zone: UTC+3:30 (IRST)
  - Summer (DST): UTC+4:30 (IRDT)

Naqsheh-ye Naser (Persian: نقشه نصار, also Romanized as Naqsheh-ye Naṣār; also known as Naqsheh) is a village in Nasar Rural District, Arvandkenar District, Abadan County, Khuzestan Province, Iran. At the 2006 census, its population was 96, in 16 families.
