= Abu Oqab =

Abu Oqab ابوعقاب
- Village
- Location within Iran
- Coordinates: 30°08′00″N 48°24′00″E
- Country: Iran
- Province: Khuzestan
- County: Abadan
- Bakhsh: Arvandkenar
- Rural District: Minubar

Population (2006)
  - Total: 704
- Time zone: UTC+3:30 (IRST)
  - Summer (DST): UTC+4:30 (IRDT)

Abu Oqab (Persian: ابوعقاب, also Romanized as Abū ‘Oqāb; also known as Bāgābb) is a village in Minubar Rural District, Arvandkenar District, Abadan County, Khuzestan Province, Iran. At the 2006 census, its population was 704, in 160 families.
