= Nahr-e Naser =

Nahr-e Naser نهرناصر
- Village
- Location within Iran
- Coordinates: 30°02′00″N 48°27′00″E
- Country: Iran
- Province: Khuzestan
- County: Abadan
- Bakhsh: Arvandkenar
- Rural District: Nasar

Population (2006)
  - Total: 81
- Time zone: UTC+3:30 (IRST)
  - Summer (DST): UTC+4:30 (IRDT)

Nahr-e Naser (Persian: نهرناصر, also Romanized as Nahr-e Nāşer; also known as Nāşer) is a village in Nasar Rural District, Arvandkenar District, Abadan County, Khuzestan Province, Iran. At the 2006 census, its population was 81, in 12 families.
