= Nahr-e Azraq =

Nahr-e Azraq نهرازرق
- Village
- Location within Iran
- Coordinates: 30°00′35″N 48°30′24″E
- Country: Iran
- Province: Khuzestan
- County: Abadan
- Bakhsh: Arvandkenar
- Rural District: Nasar

Population (2006)
  - Total: 311
- Time zone: UTC+3:30 (IRST)
  - Summer (DST): UTC+4:30 (IRDT)

Nahr-e Azraq (Persian: نهرازرق; also known as 'Azraq and Kabūdān) is a village in Nasar Rural District, Arvandkenar District, Abadan County, Khuzestan Province, Iran. At the 2006 census, its population was 311, in 66 families.
