= Nahr-e Kut, Minubar =

Nahr-e Kut نهركوت
- Village
- Country: Iran
- Province: Khuzestan
- County: Abadan
- Bakhsh: Arvandkenar
- Rural District: Minubar

Population (2006)
  - Total: 189
- Time zone: UTC+3:30 (IRST)
  - Summer (DST): UTC+4:30 (IRDT)

Nahr-e Kut (Persian: نهركوت, also Romanized as Nahr-e Kūt) is a village in Minubar Rural District, Arvandkenar District, Abadan County, Khuzestan Province, Iran. At the 2006 census, its population was 189, in 35 families.
