= Nahr-e Owj =

Nahr-e Owj (Persian: نهرعوج) may refer to:

- Nahr-e Owj Albu Seyyed
- Nahr-e Owj Albuhieh
