= Kut-e Shannuf =

Village in Khuzestan province, Iran

Kut-e Shannuf Persian: كوت شنوف
- Village
- Location within Iran
- Coordinates: 30°07′36″N 48°24′39″E
- Country: Iran
- Province: Khuzestan
- County: Abadan
- District: Arvandkenar
- Rural District: Minubar

Population (2016)
  - Total: 1,629
- Time zone: UTC+3:30 (IRST)

Kut-e Shannuf (Persian: كوت شنوف) (Note: Also romanized as Kūt Shanūf, Kūt-e Shannūf, and Kūt-e-Shanūf; also known as Del Āvīz) is a village in, and the capital of, Minubar Rural District of Arvandkenar District, Abadan County, Khuzestan province, Iran.

== Demographics ==
=== Population ===
At the time of the 2006 National Census, the village's population was 1,425 in 241 households. The following census in 2011 counted 1,624 people in 401 households. The 2016 census measured the population of the village as 1,629 people in 463 households.
