= NASSR =

NASSR or Nassr may refer to:

- Nakhichevan Autonomous Soviet Socialist Republic
- Ninjas & Superspies Revised
- North American Society for the Study of Romanticism

== See also ==
- Nasr (disambiguation)
- Nasser (disambiguation)
