= Nasr =

Nasr or Al-Nasr may refer to:

== Sports ==
=== Football ===
==== Men Teams ====
- Al Nassr FC, a Saudi Arabian professional multi-sports club
- Al Nasr CSC (Bahrain), a Bahraini club
- Al Nasr SC (Egypt), an Egyptian club
- Al Nasr SCSC (Benghazi), a Libyan club
- Al Nasr SC (Iraq), an Iraqi club
- Al Nasr SC (Kuwait), a Kuwaiti club
- Al Nasr SCSC (Salalah), an Omani club
- Al-Nasr SC (Dubai), an Emirati club
- Al Nasr Wal Salam SC, an Iraqi club
- Nasr Athlétique de Hussein Dey, an Algerian club
- ASC Nasr de Sebkha, a Mauritanian club

=== Horses ===
- Al Nasr (horse), a French-trained thoroughbred racehorse

== Places ==
- Al Nasr, Dubai, a community in Dubai, United Arab Emirates
- Al Nasr Wal Salam, also known as Al-Hasuah, city in the Abu Ghraib district of Baghdad Governorate, Iraq
- Nasr City, a suburb of Cairo, Egypt
- Nasar, Iran, also known as Nasr, a village in Razavi Khorasan Province, Iran
- Nasr, Ilam, a village in Ilam Province, Iran
- Jemdet Nasr, a tell or settlement mound in Babil Governorate, Iraq
- Teniet En-Nasr, town and commune in Bordj Bou Arréridj Province, Algeria
- Nasser, a district of Gaza City, Palestine

== People ==
- Nasr (name): list of people with the name or surname Nasr
- Nasr I, Samanid amir ruled 864–892
- Nasr II, Samanid amir, ruled 914–943
- Nasr, Sultan of Granada (1287–1322), in the Nasrid dynasty

== Politics ==
- Al-Nasr (Afghanistan), a Hazara militant group
- El Nasr Party, or in English The Victory Party, Sufi political party in Egypt

== Religion ==
- An-Nasr, or Sūrat al-Naṣr, the 110th sura of the Qur'an
- An-Nasr Mosque, mosque located in the Palestinian city of Nablus
- Umm al-Naser Mosque, mosque in Palestinian city of Beit Hanoun

== Other ==
- Nasr (idol), an idol mentioned in the Qur'an
- Nasr (car company), the state-owned Egyptian car manufacturer
- Nasr-1, an Iran-made cruise missile
- Nasr (missile), a Pakistan-made battlefield range ballistic missile (BRBM)
- El Nasr Boys' School, school in El Shatby, Alexandria, Egypt
- El Nasr Girls' College, school in El Shatby, Alexandria, Egypt
- Nasr, Claymore of Sovereignty, one of the strongest weapons on Realms of Despair

== Acronym ==
- National Airspace System Resources, an aeronautical database maintained by the National Flight Data Center (NFDC), a department of the U.S. Federal Aviation Administration (FAA)

== See also ==
- Naser (disambiguation)
- Nassar, Naseer, Nasir, different transliterations of the Arabic name
- Nasser (disambiguation)
