= Masjed, Iran =

Masjed (Persian: مسجد), in Iran, may refer to:

- Masjed, Hamadan
- Masjed, Khuzestan
- Masjed, West Azerbaijan
