= Azraq, Iran =

Azraq (Persian: ازرق) may refer to:

- Azraq, Abadan
- Azraq, Ahvaz
