= Nahr-e Hamid =

Nahr-e Hamid نهرحميد
- Village
- Location within Iran
- Coordinates: 30°05′42″N 48°26′29″E
- Country: Iran
- Province: Khuzestan
- County: Abadan
- Bakhsh: Arvandkenar
- Rural District: Nasar

Population (2006)
  - Total: 194
- Time zone: UTC+3:30 (IRST)
  - Summer (DST): UTC+4:30 (IRDT)

Nahr-e Hamid (Persian: نهرحميد, also Romanized as Nahr-e Ḩamīd; also known as Ālbū Ḩamīd and Ḩamīd) is a village in Nasar Rural District, Arvandkenar District, Abadan County, Khuzestan Province, Iran. At the 2006 census, its population was 194, in 47 families.
