= Nahr-e Kut, Nasar =

Nahr-e Kut نهركوت
- Village
- Location within Iran
- Coordinates: 30°01′00″N 48°28′00″E
- Country: Iran
- Province: Khuzestan
- County: Abadan
- Bakhsh: Arvandkenar
- Rural District: Nasar

Population (2006)
  - Total: 196
- Time zone: UTC+3:30 (IRST)
  - Summer (DST): UTC+4:30 (IRDT)

Nahr-e Kut (Persian: نهركوت, also Romanized as Nahr-e Kūt; also known as Kūt) is a village in Nasar Rural District, Arvandkenar District, Abadan County, Khuzestan Province, Iran. At the 2006 census, its population was 196, in 39 families.
