= Albu Hamid =

Village in Khuzestan province, Iran

Albu Hamid Persian: البوحميد
- Village
- Location within Iran
- Coordinates: 30°05′47″N 48°26′34″E
- Country: Iran
- Province: Khuzestan
- County: Abadan
- District: Arvandkenar
- Rural District: Minubar

Population (2016)
  - Total: 1,793
- Time zone: UTC+3:30 (IRST)

Albu Hamid (Persian: البوحميد) (Note: Also romanized as Ālbū Ḩamīd and Ālbū Hamīd) is a village in Minubar Rural District of Arvandkenar District, Abadan County, Khuzestan province, Iran.

== Demographics ==
=== Population ===
At the time of the 2006 National Census, the village's population was 1,623 in 307 households. The following census in 2011 counted 1,791 people in 448 households. The 2016 census measured the population of the village as 1,793 people in 480 households. It was the most populous village in its rural district.
