= Nahr-e Abu Felfel =

Village in Khuzestan province, Iran

Nahr-e Abu Felfel Persian: نهرابوفلفل
- Village
- Location within Iran
- Coordinates: 30°00′03″N 48°28′20″E
- Country: Iran
- Province: Khuzestan
- County: Abadan
- District: Arvandkenar
- Rural District: Nasar

Population (2016)
  - Total: 473
- Time zone: UTC+3:30 (IRST)

Nahr-e Abu Felfel (Persian: نهرابوفلفل) (Note: Also romanized as Nahr-e Abū Felfel; also known as Abū Felfel and Farkand) is a village in Nasar Rural District of Arvandkenar District, Abadan County, Khuzestan province, Iran.

== Demographics ==
=== Population ===
At the time of the 2006 National Census, the village's population was 532 in 113 households. The following census in 2011 counted 525 people in 139 households. The 2016 census measured the population of the village as 473 people in 145 households. It was the most populous village in its rural district.
