= Nasir, Iran =

Nasir (Persian: نصير) may refer to:

- Nasir, Shushtar, Khuzestan Province
- Nasir, South Khorasan
