= Ufi, Iran =

Ufi عوفي
- Village
- Location within Iran
- Coordinates: 29°58′00″N 48°33′00″E
- Country: Iran
- Province: Khuzestan
- County: Abadan
- Bakhsh: Arvandkenar
- Rural District: Noabad

Population (2006)
  - Total: 13
- Time zone: UTC+3:30 (IRST)
  - Summer (DST): UTC+4:30 (IRDT)

Ufi (Persian: عوفي, also Romanized as ‘Ūfī) is a village in Noabad Rural District, Arvandkenar District, Abadan County, Khuzestan Province, Iran. At the 2006 census, its population was 13, in 5 families.
