= Nasira =

Nasira (Arabic: ناصرة, romanized: Nāṣira, lit. 'helper, victorious') or Nasra is a feminine given name, commonly found in the Arabic language. The masculine counterpoint of the name is Nasir. Notable people with the name include:

== Given name ==
- Nasira Akhter (born 1972), Indian inventor
- Nasira Afrah Gyekye (born 1992), Ghanaian politician
- Nasira Iqbal (born 1940), Pakistani retired judge of Lahore High Court
- Nasira Khatoon, Pakistani academic
- Nasira Sharma (born 1948), Indian writer
- Nasira Zuberi, Pakistani television personality
- Nasra of Tao-Klarjeti (died 888), Georgian prince
- Nasra Abdullah (born 1985), Kenyan-Norwegian footballer
- Nasra Ali Abukar (born 2004), Somali athlete
- Nasra Al Adawi, Omani writer and poet
- Nasra bint ʿAdlan, Funj noblewoman
- Nasra Agil, Somali-Canadian civil engineer
- Nasra Ali (born 1988), Somali-Swedish politician
- Nasra Wazir Ali (1922–2015), Pakistani educationist

== Surname ==
- Hani Nasira, Egyptian author and journalist, Muslim scholar
- Sébastien Nasra, Founder of M for Montreal
