= Abu Khazravi =

Abu Khazravi ابوخضراوي
- Village
- Location within Iran
- Coordinates: 30°07′21″N 48°24′58″E
- Country: Iran
- Province: Khuzestan
- County: Abadan
- Bakhsh: Arvandkenar
- Rural District: Minubar

Population (2006)
  - Total: 594
- Time zone: UTC+3:30 (IRST)
  - Summer (DST): UTC+4:30 (IRDT)

Abu Khazravi (Persian: ابوخضراوي, also Romanized as Abū Khaẕrāvī; also known as Abū Khaẕrārī, Sabzān, and Shelīshāt) is a village in Minubar Rural District, Arvandkenar District, Abadan County, Khuzestan Province, Iran. At the 2006 census, its population was 594, in 116 families.
