= Nahr-e Owj Albuhieh =

Nahr-e Owj Albuhieh نهرعوج البوحيه
- Village
- Location within Iran
- Coordinates: 30°02′37″N 48°27′09″E
- Country: Iran
- Province: Khuzestan
- County: Abadan
- Bakhsh: Arvandkenar
- Rural District: Nasar

Population (2006)
  - Total: 136
- Time zone: UTC+3:30 (IRST)
  - Summer (DST): UTC+4:30 (IRDT)

Nahr-e Owj Albuhieh (Persian: نهرعوج البوحيه, also Romanized as Nahr-e ‘Owj Albūḥīeh; also known as Rūstā-ye ‘Owj) is a village in Nasar Rural District, Arvandkenar District, Abadan County, Khuzestan Province, Iran. At the 2006 census, its population was 136, in 29 families.
