= Hamid, Iran =

Hamid (Persian: حميد) may refer to:

- Hamid, Abadan, Khuzestan Province
- Hamid, Shushtar, Khuzestan Province
- Hamid, North Khorasan
- Hamid, West Azerbaijan
- Hamid, Mahabad, West Azerbaijan Province
