= Nahr-e Masjed =

Nahr-e Masjed نهرمسجد
- Village
- Location within Iran
- Coordinates: 30°01′00″N 48°27′00″E
- Country: Iran
- Province: Khuzestan
- County: Abadan
- Bakhsh: Arvandkenar
- Rural District: Nasar

Population (2006)
  - Total: 14
- Time zone: UTC+3:30 (IRST)
  - Summer (DST): UTC+4:30 (IRDT)

Nahr-e Masjed (Persian: نهرمسجد; also known as Masjed) is a village in Nasar Rural District, Arvandkenar District, Abadan County, Khuzestan Province, Iran. At the 2006 census, its population was 14, in 4 families.
