= Abu Abud =

Village in Khuzestan province, Iran

Abu Abud Persian: ابوعبود
- Village
- Location within Iran
- Coordinates: 30°02′13″N 48°27′40″E
- Country: Iran
- Province: Khuzestan
- County: Abadan
- District: Arvandkenar
- Rural District: Nasar

Population (2016)
  - Total: 276
- Time zone: UTC+3:30 (IRST)

Abu Abud (Persian: ابوعبود) (Note: Also romanized as Abū ‘Abūd; also known as Rūstā-ye Abū ‘Ayūd) is a village in, and the capital of, Nasar Rural District of Arvandkenar District, Abadan County, Khuzestan province, Iran.

== Demographics ==
=== Population ===
At the time of the 2006 National Census, the village's population was 303 in 64 households. The following census in 2011 counted 173 people in 51 households. The 2016 census measured the population of the village as 276 people in 83 households.
