= Nahr-e Kut =

Nahr-e Kut (Persian: نهركوت) may refer to:

- Nahr-e Kut, Minubar
- Nahr-e Kut, Nasar
