= Nahr-e Owj Albu Seyyed =

Nahr-e Owj Albu Seyyed نهرعوج البوصيد
- Village
- Location within Iran
- Coordinates: 30°02′37″N 48°27′09″E
- Country: Iran
- Province: Khuzestan
- County: Abadan
- Bakhsh: Arvandkenar
- Rural District: Nasar

Population (2006)
  - Total: 100
- Time zone: UTC+3:30 (IRST)
  - Summer (DST): UTC+4:30 (IRDT)

Nahr-e Owj Albu Seyyed (Persian: نهرعوج البوصيد, also Romanized as Nahr-e ‘Owj Albū Şeyyed; also known as Rūstā-ye ‘Owj) is a village in Nasar Rural District, Arvandkenar District, Abadan County, Khuzestan Province, Iran. At the 2006 census, its population was 100, in 24 families.
