= Nahr-e Hajji Mohammad =

Village in Khuzestan province, Iran

Nahr-e Hajji Mohammad Persian: نهرحاجي محمد
- Village
- Location within Iran
- Coordinates: 29°58′31″N 48°35′01″E
- Country: Iran
- Province: Khuzestan
- County: Abadan
- District: Arvandkenar
- Rural District: Nowabad

Population (2016)
  - Total: 56
- Time zone: UTC+3:30 (IRST)

Nahr-e Hajji Mohammad (Persian: نهرحاجي محمد) (Note: Also romanized as Nahr-e Ḩājjī Moḩammad; also known as Ḩāj Moḩammad, Ḩājj Moḩammad, and Nahr-e Ḩājj Moḩammad) is a village in Nowabad Rural District of Arvandkenar District, Abadan County, Khuzestan province, Iran.

== Demographics ==
=== Population ===
At the time of the 2006 National Census, the village's population was 75 in 18 households. The following census in 2011 counted 54 people in 15 households. The 2016 census measured the population of the village as 56 people in 18 households. It was the most populous village in its rural district.
