= Abtar, Khuzestan =

Village in Khuzestan province, Iran

Abtar Persian: ابطر
- Village
- Location within Iran
- Coordinates: 29°56′14″N 48°37′32″E
- Country: Iran
- Province: Khuzestan
- County: Abadan
- District: Arvandkenar
- Rural District: Nowabad

Population (2016)
  - Total: 27
- Time zone: UTC+3:30 (IRST)

Abtar (Persian: ابطر) (Note: Also romanized as Ābṭar) is a village in, and the capital of, Nowabad Rural District of Arvandkenar District, Abadan County, Khuzestan province, Iran. The previous capital of the rural district was the village of Alam (علم).

== Demographics ==
=== Population ===
At the time of the 2006 National Census, the village's population was 39 in 8 households. The following census in 2011 counted 40 people in 10 households. The 2016 census measured the population of the village as 27 people in 8 households.
