= Nassir =

Nassir may refer to:

- Nassir Abojalas, Saudi Arabian basketball player
- Yusuph Nassir, Tanzanian politician

== See also ==
- Nasser (disambiguation)
