= Sandhya Dhar =

Indian disability rights activist

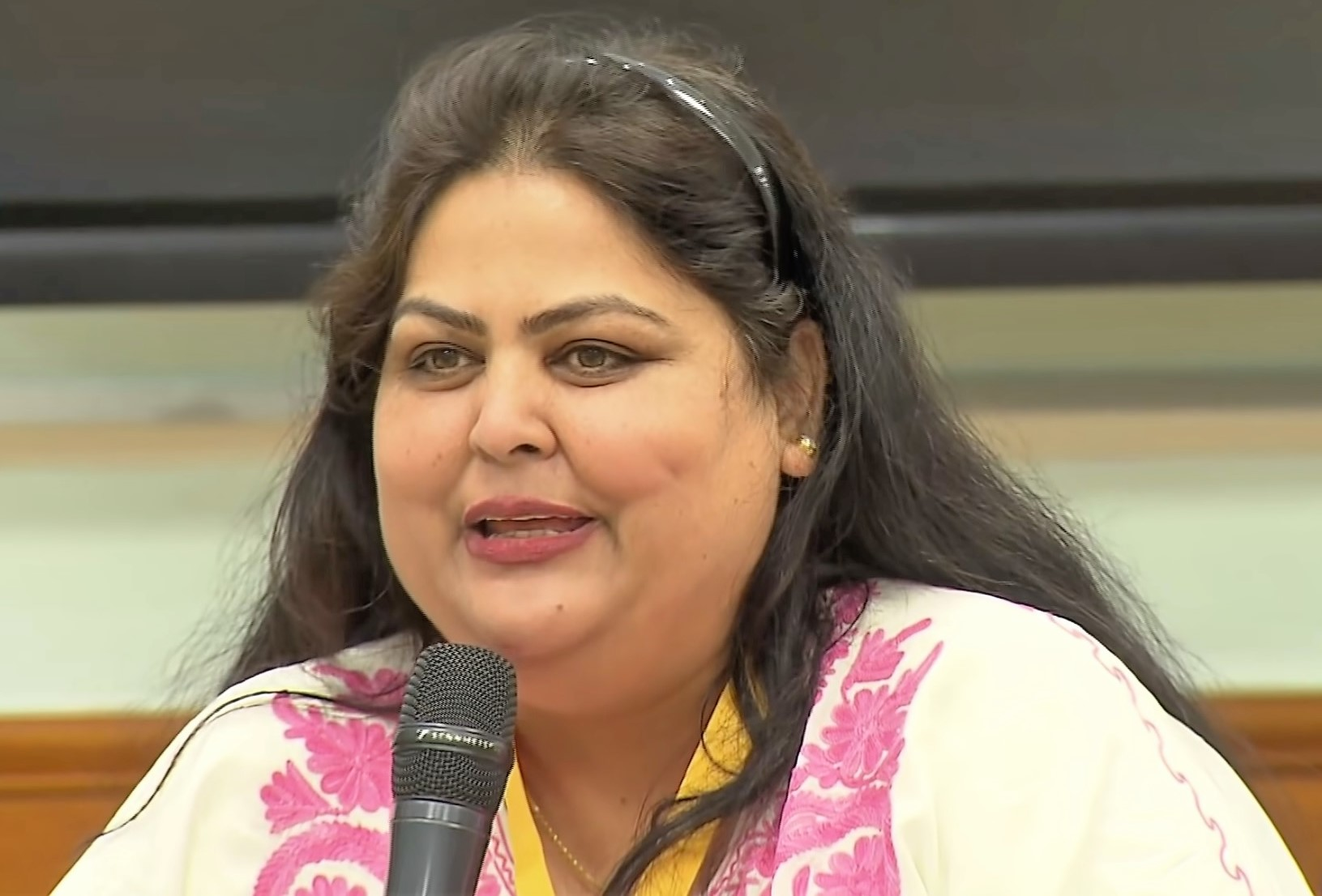
Dhar after winning the Nari Shakti Puraskar in 2022

Sandhya Dhar (born 1980) is an Indian disability rights activist. She was diagnosed with cerebral palsy at an early age and is a wheelchair user. She founded the Jammu Institute of General Education and Rehabilitation (JIGER) in 2015 to support disabled people and was awarded the 2020 Nari Shakti Puraskar.

== Career ==
Sandhya Dhar was born in early 1980 in Srinagar, the summer capital of erstwhile Indian state of Jammu and Kashmir into a Kashmiri Pandit family. At a few months old she had a fever which led to paralysis and she was diagnosed to have cerebral palsy. Her parents prioritised her care and she was sent to the Deendayal Upadhyaya Institute for the Physically Handicapped in New Delhi for two years. At five, she went to the local school and then her family moved to Jammu, where the care facilities were better. She attended the Adarsh Shiksha Niketan school and then the M. Dass school. She continued her education at the Government Degree College Parade Ground Jammu, studying for a Bachelor of Commerce, Master of Commerce, a Diploma in Computer Science and Master of Business Administration (MBA). She then worked in the finance department of the Government of Jammu and Kashmir. Dhar plays boccia and in 2022, she won a bronze medal at the Boccia National Championship.

Dhar is a wheelchair user. She became a disability rights activist and founded the Jammu Institute of General Education and Rehabilitation (JIGER) in 2015. It supports disabled people and offers lessons taught by disabled teachers. In 2022, it supported over 400 disabled children.

In 2022, she received the 2020 Nari Shakti Puraskar from President Ram Nath Kovind. Manoj Sinha, the Lieutenant Governor of Jammu and Kashmir, said in 2022 that Dhar, alongside Nasira Akhter and Nasheeman Ashraf, was an inspiration for women in the region.

== Selected works ==
- Dhar, Sandhya (2015). Political consciousness in Jammu region, 1904–1977. New Delhi, India. ISBN 978-93-5128-104-7.
- Dhar, Sandhya (2019). Political awakening in Jammu region: Papers presented in seminars, conferences. Delhi. ISBN 978-93-5324-029-5.
