= Nacer =

- Romanization: Nāṣir
- Gender: masculine
- Language: Arabic: ناصر

Origin
- Language: Arabic
- Meaning: 'granter of victory', helper, protector, supporter, victory-maker

Other names
- Alternative spelling: Naser, Nasser, Nasir, Naseer, Nassar, Nasr
- Related names: Nasrallah, Nasralla, Nasrollah, Nasrullah, Al-Nasrallah

Nacer (Arabic: ناصر, romanized: Nāṣir, lit. 'granter of victory') is a masculine given name and surname, commonly found in the Arabic and Persian languages. Alternative spellings of this name, possibly due to transliteration, include Naser, Nasser, Naseer, Nasr, and Nasir. People with this name include:

== People with the given name Nacer ==
- Nacer Abdellah (born 1966), retired Moroccan footballer
- Nacer Barazite (born 1990), Dutch footballer of Moroccan descent
- Nacer Bennemra (born 1989), Algerian footballer
- Nacer Bouhanni (born 1990), French racing cyclist
- Nacer Bouiche (born 1963), Algerian footballer
- Nacer Chahat, French Algerian-American engineer and researcher
- Nacer Chadli (born 1989), Belgian footballer of Moroccan descent
- Nacer Guedioura (born 1954), Algerian former professional footballer
- Nacer Khemir (born 1948), Tunisian writer, artist, storyteller, and filmmaker
- Nacer Sandjak (born 1953), Algerian football manager and former player
- Nacer Zekri (born 1971), Algerian footballer

== People with the surname Nacer ==
- Badr Zaki Nacer (born 1988), Moroccan footballer
- Hassen Ben Nacer (born 1986), Tunisian racing cyclist
- Myriem Nacer (born 2002), Algerian footballer
- Yvette González-Nacer, Cuban-American actress, singer-songwriter, musician and producer
