= Ufi =

Ufi or UFI may refer to:

== Codes ==
- Unique Feature Identifier, a geocode
- Unique formula identifier, to label hazardous mixtures
- Ufim language, spoken on New Guinea (ISO 639: ufi)

== Places ==
- Ufi, Iran, an Iranian village

== Organisations ==
- Ufi Ltd, a British educational charity arm
- Unión del Fútbol del Interior, a Paraguayan football body
- United Families International, an American conservative political organization
- UFA GmbH (called UFI 1942–1945), a German film and television production company
- Union des foires internationales, an association of international trade fair organizers

== See also ==
- Uffi (disambiguation)
