= Nasser (disambiguation) =

Gamal Abdel Nasser (1918–1970) was president of Egypt from 1956 to 1970.

Nasser may also refer to:

- Nasser (name), a given name and surname
- Nasser, Egypt, a city in Beni Suef Governorate, Egypt
- Nasser City or Nasr City, a suburb of Cairo, Egypt
- Lake Nasser, a reservoir in Egypt and Sudan
- Nasser Club Bar Elias, a Lebanese association football club
- Nasser, Gaza, a district in Gaza City

== See also ==
- Al-Nasr (disambiguation)
- NASA (disambiguation)
- Naser (disambiguation)
- Nasir, Naseer, Nassar, alternative transliterations of the name
- Nasri, an Arabic name
- Nasr (disambiguation)
- Nasr (surname)
- Nasser 56, 1996 Egyptian historical film
