= Arvandkenar =

City in Khuzestan province, Iran

Arvandkenar Persian: اروندكنار
- City
- Location within Iran
- Coordinates: 29°58′43″N 48°31′08″E
- Country: Iran
- Province: Khuzestan
- County: Abadan
- District: Arvandkenar

Population (2016)
  - Total: 11,173
- Time zone: UTC+3:30 (IRST)

Arvandkenar (Persian: اروندكنار) (Note: Also romanized as Arvand Kenār and Arvandkenār) is a city in, and the capital of, Arvandkenar District of Abadan County, Khuzestan province, Iran. The city is a port 50 kilometres (31 mi) south of Abadan, and has oil reserves. Arvandkenar is the last port of Iran on the Arvand River (Arvand Rud).

== Demographics ==
=== Population ===
At the time of the 2006 National Census, the city's population was 9,761 in 1,897 households. The following census in 2011 counted 8,909 people in 2,219 households. The 2016 census measured the population of the city as 11,173 people in 3,156 households.
