= Uffi =

Uffi may refer to:

- Uffi of Jutland, a legendary king

UFFI stands for:

- Urea-formaldehyde foam insulation

== See also ==
- Uffie (born 1980), American musician
- Ufi (disambiguation)
