= Red Road from Stalingrad =

- Front cover of the Stackpole Books edition
- Author: Mansur Abdulin
- Language: Russian
- Published: 1991
- Publication place: Russia

Red Road from Stalingrad is a war memoir written by Mansur Abdulin, published in Russian in 1991 and in English in 2004. In it, Abdulin recounts his service in the 293rd Rifle Division, which became the 66th Guards Rifle Division, in 1942-43. Abdulin joined the division while it was rebuilding in Buzuluk in the late summer of 1942, and he served for about a year, until he was severely wounded in action in November, 1943, during the Battle of the Dnieper. Abdulin's book is one of the first of many memoirs of ordinary Red Army soldiers (enlisted men and junior officers) that have been published in English since the end of the Cold War, giving English readers a deeper understanding of the Soviet-German War from the Soviet side.

== Creation and inspiration ==
Abdulin was severely wounded by a shell fragment in his left buttock on Nov. 28, 1943. This wound would eventually lead to his being invalided from the Red Army in 1944, but while in hospital he encountered another wounded comrade, Vasili Shamrai. The two had fought together on what they called the "Island of Death" during the Dnieper crossing.

Vasili was sad only about one thing: he regretted that there wasn't a writer who could describe what really happened on the 'Island of Death'. I could only console him by saying that someone after the war would surely write about our island, as well as about our other bloody battles.

Thirty-five years after Victory Day I will again meet Vasili Shamrai and he will ask me: "Did anyone write about the 'Island of Death?'" "No, no one did." I myself would wait for a long time, hoping that one of our comrades-in-arms would do it...

My friend Vasili Shamrai, during our next meeting in Kremenchug in December, 1981, asked me again: "Has anyone written yet?" I understood what he meant. But I did not dare disclose my secret: I had begun to write a book about us guardsmen. I wasn't sure what the result would be.

Over the following few years, Abdulin worked to complete his memoir while at least some of his comrades, such as Shamrai, were still alive to read it. Some years after its Russian publication in 1991, Artem Drabkin, a Russian popular historian of the Soviet-German War, found a copy and realized it could find an English-speaking audience. He tracked Abdulin down in the town of Novotroitsk, and suggested an English edition. Abdulin's reply was "Why not? Let's give it a try..." The English edition was published in 2004.

== Synopsis ==
The memoir begins in early November, 1942, as Abdulin arrives at the front for the first time, in the Kletskaya bridgehead on the west bank of the Don River to the north-west of Stalingrad. He is serving as the gun-layer of an 82mm mortar crew in the 1034th Rifle Regiment.

After introducing the other men of his crew, he recounts his early life in Siberia. His parents were both members of the Communist Party, educated, and somewhat outsiders in the village of Sukhoi, but valued for their literacy. In his late teens, in 1940, Abdulin left school to join his father in the Miasski gold mines. As a miner he was exempt from military service, but soon after the German invasion he and three of his friends managed to persuade local officials to allow them to enlist. Of the four, only Abdulin would survive the war.

After being sent to a military academy for officer candidates and getting very good grades, he had to use several stratagems to get sent to the front as a regular soldier with his comrades, where he also served as the komsorg (leader of the Komsomols of his company). He then recounts his first "kill" of a German soldier, while acting as a sniper, on Nov. 6. In recognition of this, he was invited to join the Communist Party, to serve as the partorg (leader of the Communists of his company), and also received the "For Courage" medal.

Abdulin next describes the reconnaissance-in-force staged by the 1034th Rifle Regiment on Nov. 14 against the German and Romanian lines; at a cost of 106 dead and 277 wounded or shell-shocked, this attack uncovered the entire enemy fire plan in preparation for the main offensive and made a marked impression on the author. The main offensive began on the 19th, and the following two chapters give his impressions of the breakthrough, exploitation and encirclement of the enemy forces, including a serious friendly-fire incident as the encirclement closed.

In the following three chapters the author recounts various incidents during Operation Koltso, the campaign to reduce the encircled enemy forces. During this time, the 293rd was operating under command of Don Front. In January, the division first liberates Pitomnik and then Gumrak airfield on the night of Jan. 21-22, which brought the German airlift to an end, abandoning thousands of wounded men. Abdulin summarizes the accomplishments of his division in this operation on page 69, and then celebrates the order that raised the division to Guards status on the 21st.

With his regiment now renumbered as the 193rd Guards Rifle Reg't., Abdulin writes of the German surrender in Stalingrad and the mopping-up operations before he and his comrades are railed northwest to become part of the 32nd Guards Rifle Corps of 5th Guards Army to the east of Kursk in Steppe Front. After the spring offensive comes to a halt, he describes the preparations for the German summer offensive. Steppe Front is in deep reserve, but has to be committed to back up Voronezh Front during the Battle of Kursk. In chapter 8 he recounts the regiment's actions in that battle, and in the next chapter the following offensive through Belgorod and into Ukraine (the Belgorod-Kharkov Offensive). Chapter 10 gives Abdulin's first-hand impressions of the storming of a bridge over the Vorskla River and the subsequent liberation of Poltava on Sept. 23.

In the following chapter Abdulin tells of the remaining stages of the race to the Dniepr. His division entered Kremenchug on Sept. 29, and soon after reached the river near the village of Vlasovka, and began crossing to a sandspit island in the river on Oct. 5. This island, partly occupied by German forces, is later referred to as the "Island of Death" in the memoir. A mixed Soviet force manages to hold their positions in the face of heavy losses until the Germans evacuate on Oct. 12. Following this, the survivors recross to the east bank to find that the entire operation had been a successful feint attack as part of the overall offensive plan.

The final chapter has Abdulin finally crossing the Dniepr with his unit in November. On the 28th he is severely wounded in action after killing a German officer, as with his first "kill" using an SVT-40 semi-automatic rifle. Coming under enemy shellfire, he is hit by a fragment in his left buttock, cutting the sciatic nerve. This crippling injury leads to his evacuation from the battlefield, long stays in hospitals, and his eventual discharge from the Red Army. In an epilogue he recounts his post-war life, mainly his work back in the gold mines, marriage, and family.

The book ends with three appendices, written by other writers, as they refer to Abdulin in the third person. The first is a brief recounting of the structure and the history of the 293rd and later 66th Guards Rifle Divisions. The second is a set of brief historical notes on the major battlefields Abdulin fought over. The third is a timeline of major events of the Second World War and the Great Patriotic War. The book also has an index.
