= Nelida Nassar =

Lebanese-American designer and art critic

Nélida Nassar
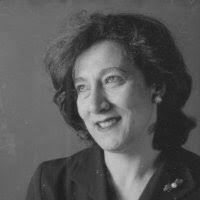
- Born: Beirut, Lebanon
- Education: Harvard University
- Occupations: Visual strategist, Art critic
- Years active: 1986–present

Nélida Nassar is a Lebanese-American designer and art critic. She founded Nassar Design in 1986 and started her own practice. Nassar is the Principal of Nassar Design, a visual strategy firm dedicated to the advancement of design innovation, interdisciplinary collaboration and an intensive dialogue with the various graphic industries. The practice work lies at the intersection of architectural signage, branding, graphic design and strategy of communication and is notable for its inventiveness in dramatically complex projects.

== Early life and education ==
Nassar was raised in Beirut, Lebanon and France. With degrees from the École nationale supérieure des arts décoratifs, the Allgemeine Gewerbeschule Basel, and Harvard University. She was educated in France, Switzerland and the USA. Nassar received a master's degree after completing the 5-year course of study in Interior Architecture from the École nationale supérieure des arts décoratifs in 1981. She continued her studies at the Allgemeine Gewerbeschule specialising and earning a master's degree in Graphic Design and Typography in 1984. She then moved to the USA where she attended the Post-Graduate program in History and Theory at Harvard University then the Executive Degree Program at the Harvard Business School in 2000.

== Work ==
The firm's award-winning projects include numerous publications for the Harvard Graduate School of Design, John F. Kennedy School of Government, The Lebanese Company for the Development and Reconstruction of Beirut Central District (Solidere), Lord Norman Foster, Art Catalogues for the Peabody Essex Museum, for painter Nabil Nahas, for sculptor Mireille Honein, the Beirut Film Festival and the Baalbeck International Festival. Signage projects for University of Cincinnati Ronald Walker Tower Sigma Sigma, Gresham Palace in Budapest, the Boston Public Library, Utah Museum of Fine Arts: UMFA, Provincetown Art Association and Museum, St. Lawrence University, Weidlinger Associates Headquarters, Scully Hall at Princeton University, Nathan Marsh Pusey Library and the Farkas Hall, New College Theatre, Hasty Pudding Theater at Harvard University. Currently, the firm is working on a signage project for Veolia Energy North America, an environmental installation for the Cheng Long Wetlands art project in Taiwan. Recently completed projects are the design of the exhibition catalogues for the Metropolitan Museum of Art, the Chinese Porcelain Company, "Word" exhibition catalogues for Al-Madinah Al-Munawarrah Research and Studies Center, Saudi Arabia. The firm has designed logos and branding programs for such companies as Ars Libri, ltd., Cosentini Associates, Leers Weinzapfel Associates Architects, Machado and Silvetti Associates, The Stubbins Associates Inc, Weidlinger Associates. Nassar Design is responsible for UNESCO's Literacy Visual Campaign worldwide.

Nélida teaches at Tufts University Experimental College, and has taught as a visiting faculty member at Boston Architectural College. In 2003, she was a Visiting Artist at the American Academy in Rome, in 2007 a Visiting Artist at Cairo University. She lectures widely throughout the United States and abroad.

== Art criticism ==
In 2013, Nassar founded Art and Culture Today, an international platform for reasoned, innovative, and wide-ranging debate about art, architecture, literature, dance, music, and theatre, with an emphasis on the most creative and imaginative trends in those fields. Contributors seek, in particular, to bridge the gaps between the global and the local, and between East and West, and to bring to light both the congruences and dissimilarities among competing positions (without regard to whether these are likely to be avowed or rejected by the contending parties).

== Articles ==
Nassar has authored several articles about design and design history. Among the submitted papers are: "Fusion between symbolist Poetry and the other arts: A visual dialogue of Concrete Poetry from Mallarmé to Apollinaire" University of Montreal, The Language of Modernism Conference, November 2009; "Who's Afraid of New Media?" at Babeș-Bolyai University, Media Center & Journalism, Interdisciplinary New Media Conference, Romania, Transylvania, May 2009. Two other papers were also presented at the International Society for the Study of European Ideas (ISSEI). "Memory through Visual Language: Linking Contemporary Middle Eastern Art and the European Tradition" at the University of Helsinki, Finland, during the Language and The Scientific, Imagination Conference, July 2008; "Observations among Seminal Art Pieces from The Caves of Lascaux to African Sculpture" at the University of Malta, Valletta Campus, during The European Mind Narrative and Identity Conference August 2006.

== Exhibitions ==
In 2009, the French Cultural Center showed a retrospective of Nassar Design projects, under the title: "Nélida Nassar: Graphic Design Influence." Several of the posters designed for various clients are in the permanent collections of the Pompidou Center, Paris and the Library of Congress, Washington, D.C., the Pushkin Museum, Moscow and the American University of Beirut.

== Lectures ==
Nassar has lectured widely at institutions including the University of Montréal, Canada (2009); the Babeș-Bolyai University, Romania, Transylvania (2009); University of Helsinki, Finland (2008); University of Malta, Valletta Campus (2006). Nassar has participated in many symposia including the "Authentic Poor Rich Sell-out" panel at the Horology Forum of Dubai Watch Week 2021. An intellectual space consisting of free-flowing discussions between master craftsmen, captains of industries, visionaries and seasoned collectors. The panel was positioned to enlighten audiences and participants with their coveted insights and diverse opinions whilst dissecting the topic in question. Nelida was a speaker on the panel "Authentic Poor Rich Sell-out" at the Horology Forum of Dubai Watch Week 2021. An intellectual space consisting of free-flowing discussions between master craftsmen, captains of industries, visionaries and seasoned collectors. The panel was positioned to enlighten audiences and participants with their coveted insights and diverse opinions whilst dissecting the topic in question.

== Awards ==
As the principal and founder of Nassar Design, Nassar's work has been recognized with over 50 notable design awards. She was nominated four times in 1998, 1999, 2000 and 2001 for the Chrysler Design Award. In 1998, the firm received the first prize for cultural posters at the IV Biennale de Lahti, Finland, in addition to several awards from the American Institute of Graphic Arts (AIGA) and Graphis.

== Related publications ==
- The Big Book of Logos], Author: Henry Hearst Books International and David E. Carter, Publisher: Nippon Shuppan Ilanbai, Germany, 1999
- The New Big Book of Logos, Author: David E. Carter, Publisher: HarperCollins, 2000
- American Corporate Identity 2002, Author: David E. Carter, Publisher: HarperCollins, 2002
- Allo Magazine, Author: France Younane, Publisher: Eliane Gebbara, No. 14, December 2002 – January 2003
- Creativity 32: Bright Ideas in Advertising and Design from Around the World, Author: David E. Carter, Publisher: HarperCollins, 2003
- The Big Book of Color in Design, Author: David E. Carter, Publisher: HarperCollins, 2003
- The Big Book of Layouts, Author: David E. Carter, Publisher: HarperCollins, 2003
- The Little Book of Layouts: Good Designs and Why They Work, Author: David E. Carter, Publisher: HarperCollins, 2003
- American Corporate Identity 2004, Author: David E. Carter, Publisher: HDI and imprint of HarperCollins, 2004
- Creativity 33: Bright Ideas in Advertising and Design from Around the World, Author: David E. Carter, Publisher: HarperCollins, 2004
- Creativity 34: Bright Ideas in Advertising and Design from Around the World, Author: David E. Carter, Publisher: HarperCollins, 2005
- The Little Book of Big Promotions, Authors: Cheryl Dangel Cullen, Lisa I. Cyr and Lisa Hickey, Publisher: Rockport Publishing Group, 2005
- 1000 Bags, Tags & Labels Distinctive Design For Every Industry, Author: Kiki Elbridge, Publisher: Rockport Publishing Group, 2006
- Creativity 34: Bright Ideas in Advertising and Design from Around the World, Author: David E. Carter, Publisher: HarperCollins, 2006
- 2005 AIGA's BoNE Show Exhibition, Author: David E. Carter, Publisher: Quarry Books, 2007
- American Graphic Design Awards, Author: David E. Carter, Publisher: Quarry Books, 2007
- Creativity 36: Bright Ideas in Advertising and Design from Around the World, Author: David E. Carter, Publisher: HarperCollins, 2007
- Graphic Design In The USA 9, Author: David E. Carter, Publisher: Quarry Books, 2007
- Creativity 37: Bright Ideas in Advertising and Design from Around the World, Author: David E. Carter, Publisher: HarperCollins, 2008
- 1000 Garment Graphics A Comprehensive Collection of Wearable Designs, Author: Jeffrey Everett of El Jefe Design, Publisher: Rockport Publishing Group, 2009
