= Nassa =

Nassa may refer to:

- Noradrenergic and specific serotonergic antidepressant or NaSSA
- Nassa (gastropod), genus of sea snails
- NASSA, Negro American Space Society of Astronauts, a fictitious organization from the mockumentary The Old Negro Space Program
- the National Secretariat for Social Action of Caritas Philippines
- Nassa, a traditional conical fish trap in Mozambique

== See also ==
- NASA (disambiguation)
