= Nasrallah =

- Gender: masculine
- Language: Arabic: نصرالله

Origin
- Meaning: 'Victory of God'

Other names
- Alternative spelling: Nasralla, Nasrollah, Nasrullah, Al-Nasrallah
- Related names: Nasser, Naser, Nassar, Nasir, Naseer, Nacer, Nasr, Nasri

Nasrallah (Arabic: نصرالله, lit. 'victory of God') is a masculine given name commonly found in the Arabic language and is used by Muslims and Christians. It may also be transliterated as Nasralla, Nasrollah, Nasrullah, and Al-Nasrallah. Bearing the surname often indicates that the family adopted the name Nasrallah from one of its patrilineal ancestors.

== Notable people ==
Notable people with the name Nasrallah and its variants include:

=== Afghanistan ===
- Nasrollah Sarvari (1942–2017) Afghani painter, educator

=== Egypt ===
- Yousry Nasrallah (born 1952), Egyptian film director

=== Honduras ===
- Salvador Nasralla (born 1953), Honduran media personality, TV presenter, politician, founder of Honduran Anti-Corruption Party

=== Iraq ===
In Iraq, the most notable family to carry the name is the Alid Faizid family of Nasrallah from Karbala. However, there are other Alid and non-Alid families that carry the name, that come from Hindiyah, Hillah, and Nasiriyah.

- Nasrallah al-Haeri (1696–1746), Iraqi scholar and poet
- Jawad Nasrallah (d. 1808), Iraqi nobleman and custodian of Imam Husayn Shrine
- Hassan Nasrallah (1881–1959), Iraqi nobleman, activist, and businessman
- Murtadha Nasrallah (1922–2005), Iraqi law professor
- Hashem Nasrallah (1923–1997), Iraqi businessman and chairman of Karbala's chamber of commerce
- Mohammed Hussain Nasrallah (born 1951), Iraqi judge and prosecutor
- Abdul Sahib Nasrallah (born 1951), Iraqi author and custodian of Imam Husayn Shrine
- Aref Nasrallah (born 1958), Iraqi social activist and philanthropist

=== Iran ===
- Abu'l-Ma'ali Nasrallah, Persian poet, statesman and vizier
- Moein (singer), Iranian singer
- Nasrallah Shah-Abadi, Iranian Shia cleric, politician
- Nasrollah Jahangard, Iranian politician
- Nasrollah Sajjadi, Iranian politician and sports administrator
- Nasrollah Pejmanfar, Iranian Shia cleric, politician
- Nasrollah Nasehpour, Iranian-Azeri music composer

=== Kazakhstan ===
- Nasrullah Nauryzbai Kutpanbetuly Bahadur

=== Kuwait ===
In Kuwait, the most notable family to carry the name is known as the family of Al-Nasrallah. They trace back to the Anazzah tribe, and migrated from Sudair. They reside mainly in Jiblah and Jahrah.

- Danah Al-Nasrallah (born 1988), Kuwaiti female track and field athlete

=== Lebanon ===
In Lebanon, the name can be found in Shia, Sunni, Druze, and Christian families all across Lebanon, and they trace back to Sednayah, Hauran and Babylon.

- Nasrallah Boutros Sfeir (1923–1997), Lebanese patriarch of Lebanon's largest Christian body
- Emily Nasrallah (1931–2018), Lebanese writer and women's rights activist
- Hassan Nasrallah (1960–2024), Secretary General of the Lebanese political party Hezbollah
- Hassan Nasrallah (born 1982), Lebanese footballer

=== Mexico ===
- Jesús Nader Nasrallah (born 1959), Mexican politician

=== Pakistan ===
- Nasrullah Khan (footballer) (born 1985), Pakistani football midfielder
- Mir Ahmed Nasrallah Thattvi, 16th-century Muslim geographer and historian

=== Palestine ===
In Palestine, it is believed that the Nasrallah family traces back to either the one that originated in the Levant (North Syria and Rif-Dimashq), or in the Arabian Peninsula (Saudi Arabia and Yemen). They reside mainly in Qaqun.

- Adel Gharib Nasrallah, birth name of Eddie Nash (1929–2014), Palestinian-American convicted gangster and drug dealer
- Ibrahim Nasrallah (born 1954), Jordanian-Palestinian poet

=== United States ===
- Nasrallah Onea "Naz" Worthen (born 1966), American football wide receiver
