= Nasser Abu Hamid =

Palestinian militant (1972–2022)

- ناصر أبو حميد
- Born: 5 October 1972; Nuseirat Camp, Gaza Strip
- Died: 20 December 2022 (aged 50); Shamir Medical Center, Be'er Ya'akov, Israel
- Years active: 1987–2022
- Political party: Fatah
- Criminal charges: Charged with 13 different counts including murder
- Criminal penalty: Seven life sentences plus 50 years

Nasser Abu Hamid (Note: also spelled Nasser Abu Hmeid) (Arabic: ناصر أبو حميد; 5 October 1972 – 20 December 2022) was a Palestinian militant. He was a leader of the al-Aqsa Martyrs' Brigades. He was known as "Barghouti's right hand man". He was arrested in April 2002 and was given seven life sentences plus 50 years for multiple murder convictions. After twenty years in prison, he died from cancer.

== Militant career ==
Abu Hamid was born on 5 October 1972, in Nuseirat Camp, Gaza Strip. His family originated from the depopulated community of Al-Sawafir al-Shamaliyya of Mandatory Palestine, and later moved to Al-Amari Camp near Ramallah, West Bank.

Abu Hamid was arrested for the first time prior to the 1987 First Intifada, serving four months. He was first given a life sentence in jail in 1990 for attempting to kill four Israelis in separate attempts, but he was freed in 1994 as part of a deal between the Palestinian Authority and Israel that also saw a significant number of Palestinians released. He was released from prison in 1999 as part of a prisoner exchange agreement, and up to the Al-Aqsa uprising, he worked for the Palestinian Authority's Ministry for Prisoner Affairs.

Following his announcement of the formation of the Al-Aqsa Martyrs Brigades in January 2001, Abu Hamid became well-known as the group started to increase its operations in the West Bank and acquire significant power on the Palestinian street. Senior officials of the Palestinian Authority asked him to join them, but he chose Marwan Barghouti, eventually becoming his right hand man and personal assistant.

Abu Hamid took part in the Ramallah lynching in 2000 and murdered three Israelis in shooting attacks that same year. He also planned and directed three attacks in 2002. According to the indictment filed against him in July 2002, he founded the Al-Aqsa Martyrs Brigades, was a former activist in the Fatah youth, and assisted in planning protests against Ariel Sharon's visit to the Al-Aqsa Mosque that sparked the Intifada in September 2000.

When the jury returned its verdict on 24 December 2002, he told reporters in the courtroom, "I do not regret it, the Palestinians have a genuine right to combat the Israeli occupation. I fought". Four additional brothers—three of whom were also apprehended with him during the Al-Aqsa Intifada—are all serving life sentences. A fifth brother of his was detained in 2018 and was given a life term and an eight-year prison term as well. Abdel Moneim, another brother, was killed in 1994. Their house has been demolished several times, most recently in 2019.

== Death ==
While serving his life sentences in prison, Abu Hamid was diagnosed with lung cancer in August 2021. He died in Assaf Harofeh Hospital on 20 December 2022.

Benny Gantz, Israel's Defense Minister, refused to return his body to his family, saying that it was in keeping with Israeli policy to retain prisoners who died for future negotiations to repatriate Israeli soldiers that may later be captured and held. He also denied that Israel had any role in his death.

Palestinian Authority President Mahmoud Abbas accused Israel authorities of “deliberate medical negligence”. The Organization of Islamic Cooperation (OIC) also held Israel accountable for his death and demanded the formation of an international commission of inquiry to investigate this "new crime".

== See also ==
- Palestinian prisoners of Israel
