= Yazab =

Yazab يزاب
- Village
- Location within Iran
- Coordinates: 31°47′56″N 48°39′09″E
- Country: Iran
- Province: Khuzestan
- County: Shushtar
- Bakhsh: Shadravan
- Rural District: Shoaybiyeh-ye Gharbi

Population (2006)
  - Total: 334
- Time zone: UTC+3:30 (IRST)
  - Summer (DST): UTC+4:30 (IRDT)

Yazab (Persian: يزاب, also Romanized as Yazāb and Yaz Āb; also known as Ḩamīd) is a village in Shoaybiyeh-ye Gharbi Rural District, Shadravan District, Shushtar County, Khuzestan Province, Iran. At the 2006 census, its population was 334, in 49 families.
