= Nasir =

Arabic masculine name

- Romanization: Nāṣir
- Gender: masculine
- Language: Arabic: ناصر

Other gender
- Feminine: Nasira

Origin
- Language: Arabic
- Meaning: helper, protector, supporter, victory-maker

Other names
- Alternative spelling: Naser, Nasser, Nassar, Naseer, Nacer, Nasr
- Related names: Nasir al-Din, Nasrallah, Nasralla, Nasrollah, Nasiruddin, Nasrullah, Al-Nasrallah

Nasir (Arabic: ناصر, romanized: Nāṣir) is a masculine given name, commonly found in Arabic, which can mean "helper" or "one who gives victory" (grammatically the Stem I masculine singular active participle of consonantal verb root n-ṣ-r). The plural, Ansar, is used to refer to the inhabitants of Medina who supported the Islamic prophet Muhammad. The female form of the name is Nasira (Arabic: ناصرة, romanized: Nāṣira). Alternative spellings of this name, possibly due to transliteration, include Naser, Nasser, Naseer, and Nacer.

== People ==
=== People with the given name ===
- Ea-nasir (18th century BCE), copper merchant
- Nasir ibn Alnas (also known as An-Nasir ibn Alnas) (died 1088), fifth ruler of the Hammadids in Algeria
- Nasir ad-Din Qabacha (1150–1228), Muslim Turkic governor of Multan
- Al-Nasir (1158–1225), Abbasid caliph who ruled from 1158 to 1225
- Nasir al-Din Shah (1831–1896), ruler of Qajar dynasty in present-day Iran
- Nasir Kazmi (1925–1972), Pakistani Urdu poet
- Nasir Valika (born 1955), Pakistani cricketer
- Nasir Gebelli (born 1957), Iranian-American video game developer
- Naser Orić (born 1967), Bosnian military officer during the Bosnian War
- Nasir Jones, professionally known as Nas (born 1973), American rapper, actor, entrepreneur
- Nasir Adderley (born 1997), American football player

=== People with the surname ===
- Gamal Abdel Nasser (1918–1970), second President of Egypt
- Ibrahim Nasir (1926–2008), Maldivian President
- Vali Nasr (born 1960), Iranian-American Middle Eastern expert
- Hakim Nasir (1947–2007), Pakistani Urdu poet also using the takhallus of Nasir
- Clare Nasir (born 1970), British weather forecaster
- Serdar Nasır, Turkish plastic surgeon
- Felipe Nasr (born 1992), Brazilian racing driver
- Bachtiar Nasir (born 1967), Indonesian ulama

=== Fictional characters with the name ===
- Nasir, the main character in the video game Lagoon
- Nasir, character in the TV series Spartacus
- Nasir, a playable character in both Fire Emblem: Path of Radiance and its sequel Fire Emblem: Radiant Dawn
- Nasir, a Saracen character played by Mark Ryan in the British 1980s television series Robin of Sherwood (aired in the US as Robin Hood)
- Nasir Meidan, a fictional character in the Android: Netrunner
- Nasir Khan, a fictional character in the television miniseries The Night Of

== Places ==
- Kalateh-ye Nasir, Iran
- Nasir, Shushtar, Iran
- Nasir, South Sudan, the administrative center of Nasir County

== Other uses ==
- Nasir (album), by American rapper Nas
- Nasir (film), a 2020 Indian film
- Nasir (missile), an Iranian cruise missile

== See also ==
- Abdul Nasir
- Naseer (disambiguation)
- Nasira (disambiguation)
- Nasir al-Din
- Nazir (disambiguation)
- Arabic name
- Ansar (Islam)
