= Nassar Mansour =

Arab calligrapher

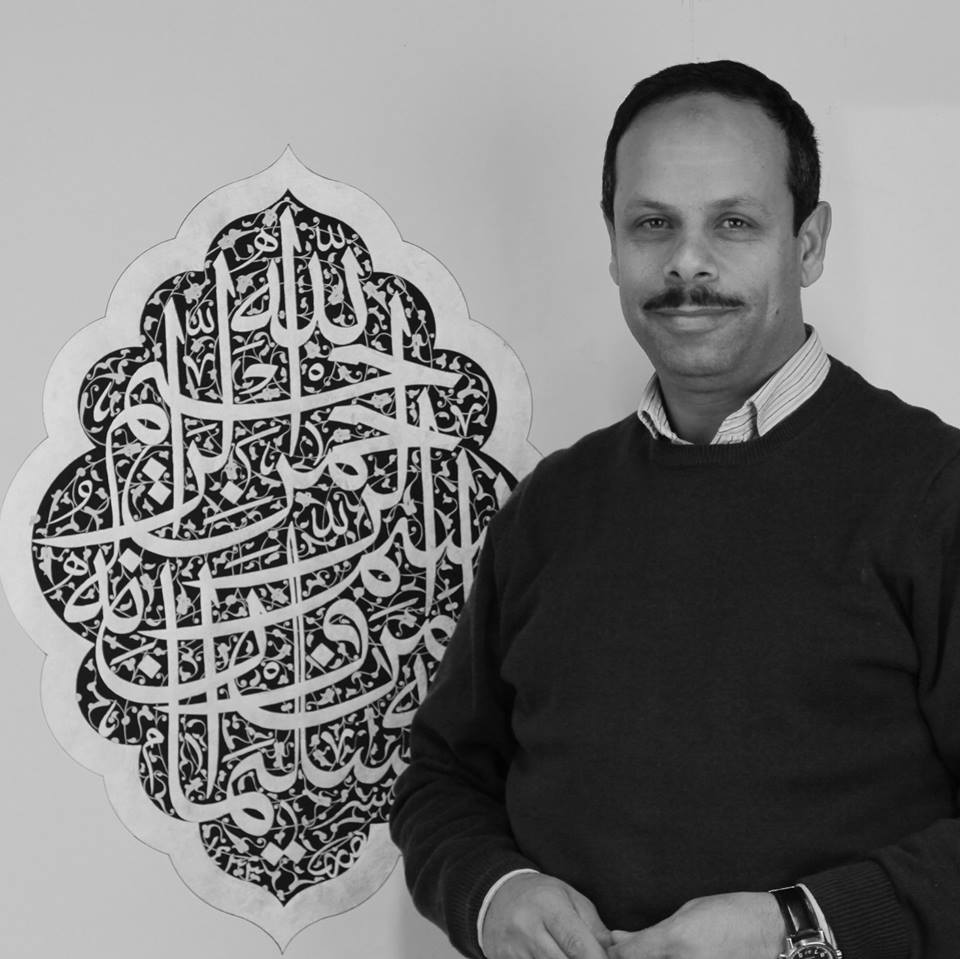
Photo of Dr. Nassar Mansour

Nassar Mansour (Arabic: نصّار منصور), (born February 2, 1967), is an artist, calligrapher, academic and designer in the field of Islamic Arts, specializing in Islamic Calligraphy. He is best known for his academic research on Islamic Calligraphy and for his academic and artistic efforts in reviving Muhaqqaq (one of the six classical scripts الخطوط الستة) as an artistic medium for contemporary Islamic calligraphers. Nassar was the first Jordanian to obtain the traditional Ijaza in calligraphy from master calligrapher Hasan Çelebi, in Istanbul in 2003. In April 2018, he was awarded the Artistic Creativity Award for his academic and artistic efforts in reviving the Muhaqqaq script by the Arab Thought Foundation (ATF).

== Early life and education ==
Nassar Mansour was born in Amman, Jordan. He is the youngest son of the Jordanian-Palestinian poet Muhammad Mansour Abu Mansour (1913-2000). His family originally came from Joureesh, Nablus in Palestine, but Mansour has lived his entire life in Amman.

He obtained his BA in Islamic studies, economics and statistics from the University of Jordan in 1988. In 1997, he graduated with an MA degree in Islamic Arts specializing in Islamic Calligraphy from Al al-Bayt University in Jordan. In 2007, he was awarded a PhD in the Art of Islamic Calligraphy from the Prince's School of Traditional Arts (PSTA), London.

== Career ==
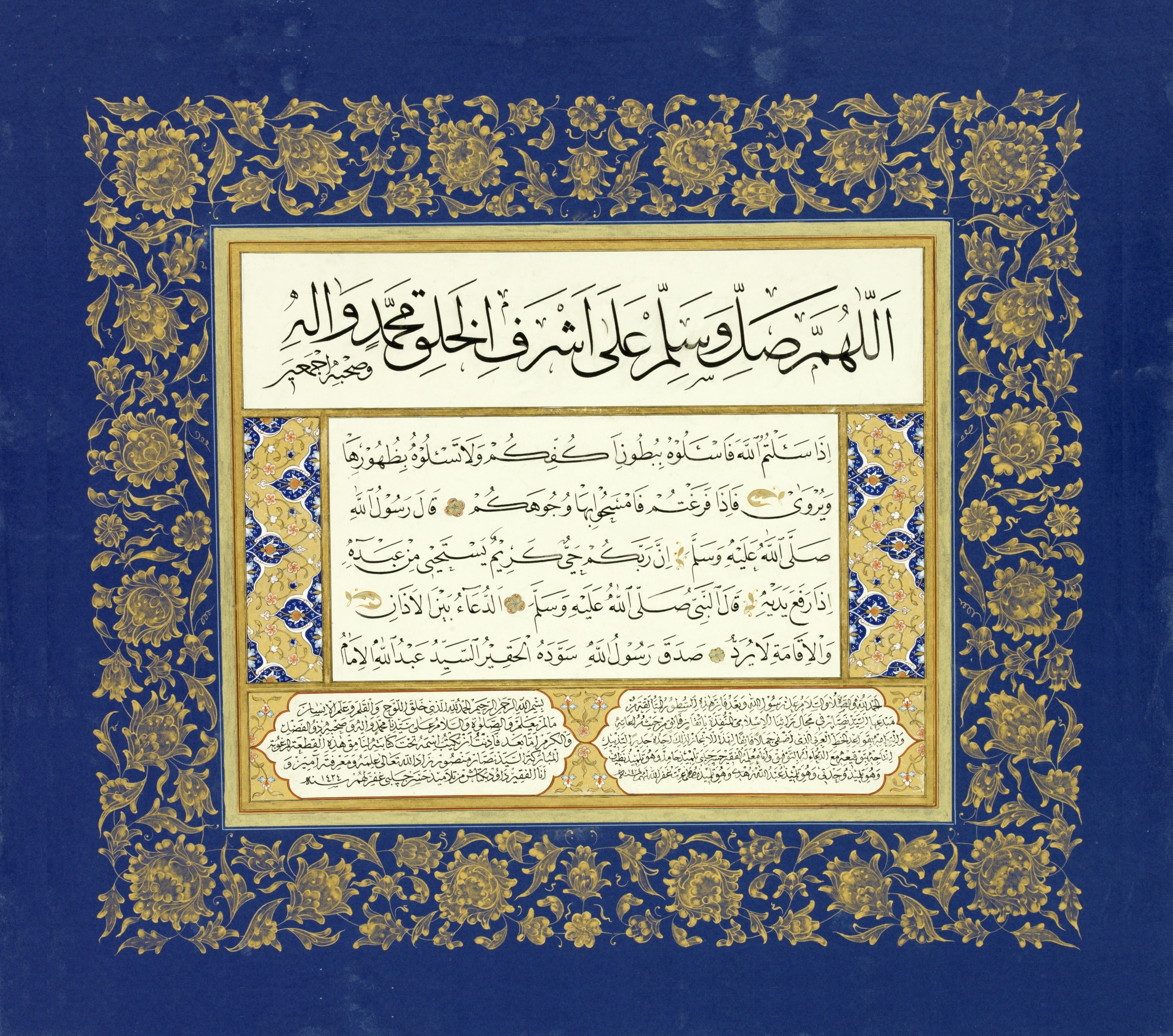
Nassar's Ijaza, 2003

Immediately after graduating, Mansour began working as a lecturer (1988-1995) of Arabic Calligraphy at the Faculty of Education and the Language Centre at the University of Jordan. In 1998, he became a member of Al-Balqa` Applied University in Jordan where he contributed to the establishment of the Institute of Traditional Islamic Arts in 1998. This institute was responsible for the reconstruction of the 12th-century Saladin's pulpit (minbar), which was installed in its original place at al-Aqsa Mosque in Jerusalem in 2006. Mansour was principally responsible for redrawing and designing the entire inscriptions and ornamentation of the Minbar.

He lectured at the Prince's School of Traditional Arts from 2002 to 2007 while working on his PhD. He is currently the professor of Islamic Calligraphy and Qur'anic manuscripts at the department of Islamic Arts, at the College of Islamic Arts and Architecture, W.I.S.E University, Jordan, and a researcher in the Islamic Manuscript Association (TIMA), Cambridge, a project of cataloguing the Mamluk and Ilkhanid Qur’an manuscripts at Dar el-Kotob in Cairo.

== Artworks and exhibitions ==
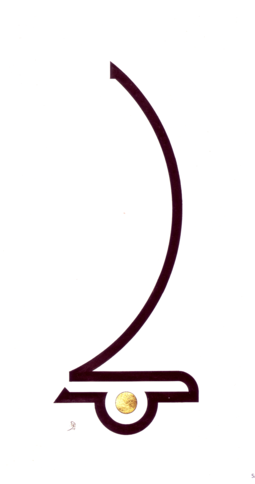
Kun, 2003, permanent collection at The British Museum, London.

Mansour's calligraphy works include ink on paper, as well as other media such as stone, ceramic, mosaic, glass, wood, metals and more. His artworks are held in the permanent collections of museums including the British Museum in London, the Contemporary Museum of Calligraphy in Moscow, the Aga Khan Museum in Toronto, the Jordan National Gallery of Fine Arts in Amman and in private collections.

=== Solo exhibitions references ===
- 2017 From the Heart to the Pen, Arabic Calligraphy Artworks, in collaboration with his pupil Sir Mark Allen, Calligraphy Museum, Sharjah.

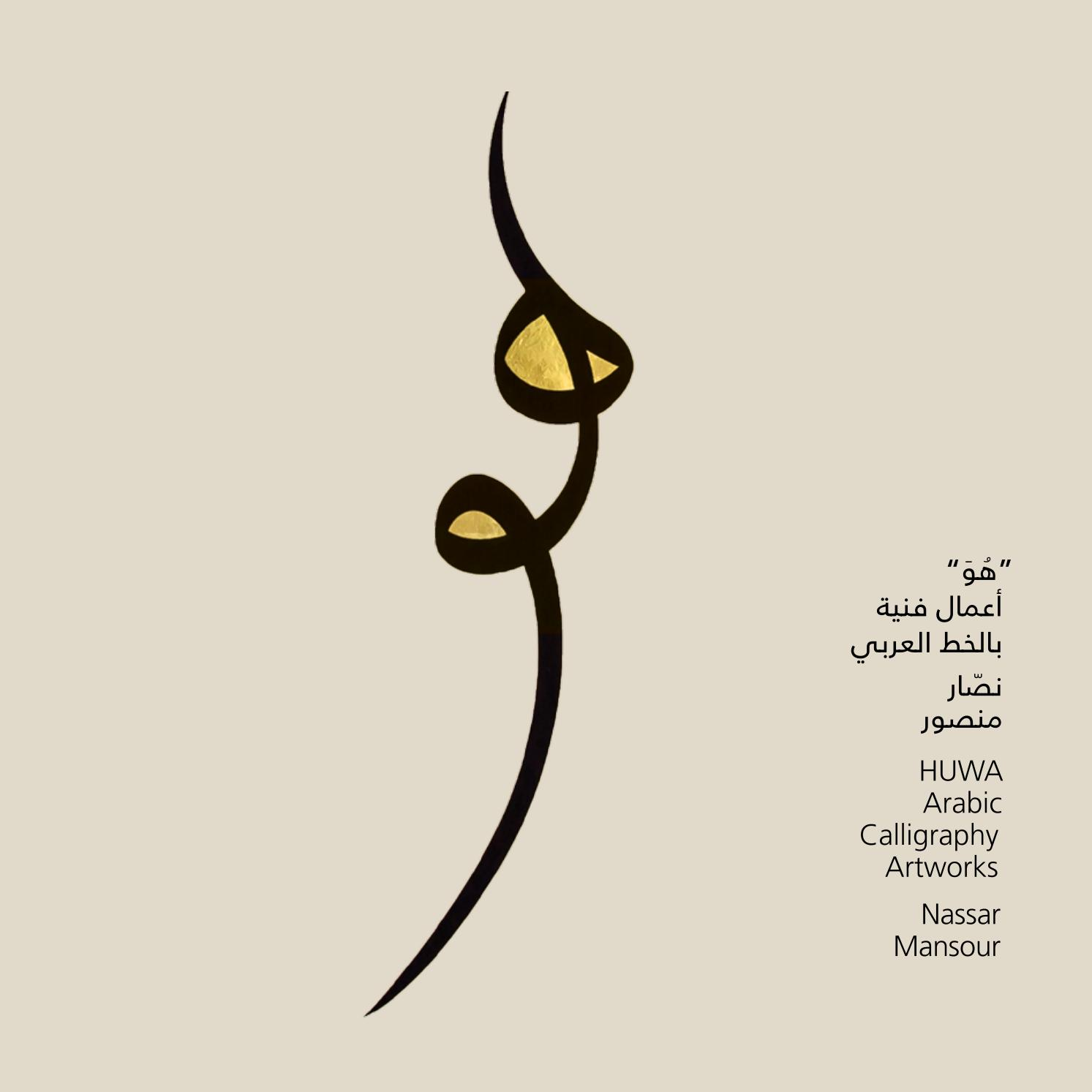
HUWA catalogue cover

- 2017 HUWA, Arabic Calligraphy Artworks, Tabari ArtSpace, Dubai.
- 2010 Curated the exhibition “The Ultimate Journey” at the Jordan National Gallery of Fine Arts on the occasion of the celebration of al-Quds (Jerusalem) Capital of Arab Culture.
- 2007 “Muhaqqaq and More”, Arabic Calligraphy Artworks, The Prince's School of Traditional Arts Gallery, London.
- 2005 “Making of the Master”, the story of the Ijaza tradition in Islamic Calligraphy, curated by Nassar Mansour in corporation with Venetia Porter, The British Museum, London.
- 1998 Ahl al-Bayt, Jordan National Gallery of Fine Arts, Amman.

=== Selected group exhibitions ===
- 2017 “The 9th Dubai International Arabic Calligraphy Exhibition”, Dubai.
- 2016 “The Human Image: Masterpieces of figurative art from The British Museum”, London.
- 2015 “Islamic Art Now Contemporary Art of The Middle East“, LACMA Museum, LA.
- 2014 “Muhaqqaq Script”, The Dubai Arabic Calligraphy Centre, Dubai.
- 2013 “Words and Illumination”, Medina Municipality in cooperation with The British Museum, Madina.
- 2013 “Illumination: The Light of Tradition”, The Gallery at Linlithgow Burgh Halls Scotland.
- 2013 “The Ultimate Journey”, Knowledge Economic City, Madina.
- 2013 “Word”, Mandeville Exhibition Space, London.
- 2012 “The Ultimate Journey”, Dolmabahçe Art Gallery, Istanbul.
- 2012 “Beauty and Belief”, BYU Museum of Art, Utah.
- 2010 “The Ultimate Journey”, curated by Nassar Mansour in corporation with Layan Cultural Foundation, Jordan National Gallery of Fine Arts, Amman.
- 2010 “The Future of Tradition-The Tradition of Future”, 100 Years after the Exhibition "Masterpieces of Muhammadan Art" in Munich, Haus der Kunst, Munich.
- 2009 “The 1st International Calligraphy Exhibition”, Sokolniki Exhibition and Convention Centre, Moscow.
- 2008 “The 2nd International Calligraphy Exhibition”, Academy of Arts, St. Petersburg.
- 2008 “Word into Art: Artists of the Modern Middle East” from the collections of The British Museum, Dubai Financial Centre, Dubai.
- 2006 “Word into Art: Artists of the Modern Middle East” The British Museum, London.
- 2005 “A Building Tradition: The Work of The Prince’s School of Traditional Arts”, The National Building Museum, Washington, DC.
- 2004 “Arabic Script: Mightier than the Sword”, by the Islamic Arts Museum of KL and The British Museum, Kuala Lumpur.
- 2003 “Arabic Script: Mightier than the Sword”, from the collections of The British Museum, Ian Potter Museum of Art, University of Melbourne, Australia.

=== Selected public artwork ===
- 2012 The Inscriptions of al-Risala Mosque, Amman.
- 2003 The Inscriptions of the Arab Army Martyrs Mausoleum, Irbid, Jordan.
- 2002 The Statue of ‘Ahl al-‘Azm, stone, Amman.
- 1998 The Statue of Amman, stone and mosaic, Amman.
- 1998 The Architectural Inscriptioens and Ornamentations of al-Balqa’ Applied University Gate, Al-Salt, Jordan
- 1996-1999 Designing the Calligraphy Inscriptions and Ornamentations of the Twelfth-Century Saladin's Pulpit (minbar), al-Aqsa Mosque/Jerusalem.
- 1995-2000 Designing the Calligraphy and Ornamentations of the Jordanian Currency, Coins and Banknotes, Central Bank of Jordan, Amman.

== Publications ==
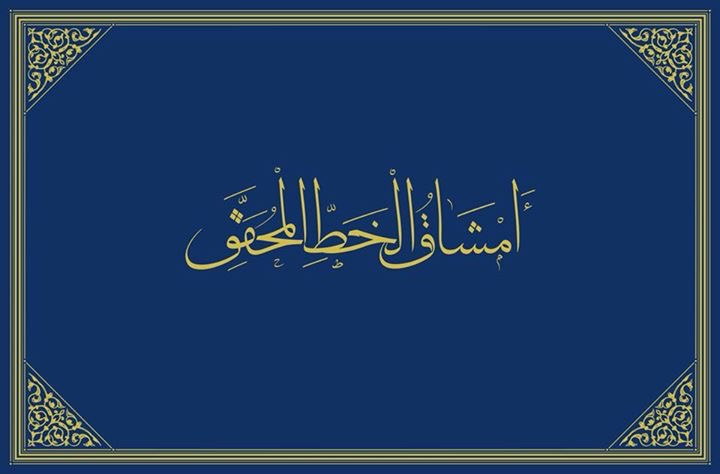
Amshaq al-Khatt al-Muhaqqaq book

=== Books ===
- Amshaq al-Khatt al-Muhaqqaq (أمشاق الخط المحقق), (in Arabic, English, Turkish and Persian), 2017, The Royal Hashemite Documentation Centre (RHDC), Amman.
- Flowers of Devotion, Asma-e-Rasool-e-Kareem, Painting and Calligraphy Devoted to the Prophet Mohammad, collaboration work with Neyyar Ehsan Rashid (in English, Arabic and Urdu), 2017, Lahore, Pakistan.
- Sacred Script; Muhaqqaq in Islamic Calligraphy, (in English), 2011, I. B. Tauris & Co Ltd, London, New York,.
- Al-Ijaza fi Fann al-Khatt al-‘Arabi, (in Arabic), 2000, Dar Majdalawi for Publishing and Distribution, Amman.

=== Chapters in books ===
- “Arabic Calligraphy”, Arts and Crafts of the Islamic Lands, ed. Khaled Azzam, (in English), 2013, Thames and Hudson, London, New York.
- “The Role of Muhaqqaq Script in Copying the Qur’anic Manuscripts”, (in Arabic), Research and Studies Dedicated to Muhammad ‘Adnan al-Bakhit on the Occasion of his Seventieth Birthday, ed. Mohammad A. Khuraisat, 2013, University of Jordan, Amman. pp. 371-420.
- “Arabic Calligraphy”, The Complete Guide To Calligraphy, (in English), 2006, CICO Books, London, New York, pp. 164-179.
- “The Tradition of Ijaza in Arabic Calligraphy”, (in Arabic), “Studies in the History of Damascus in Honour of Yusuf Ibish, ed. Muhammad ‘Adnan al-Bakhit, 2006, Al-Furqan Foundation for Islamic Heritage, London, pp. 359-416.

=== Academic articles ===
- Tawqi’ and Riqa’, Preliminary Observations, (in Arabic), 2018.
- Yaqut al-Musta’simi, Analytical Study of the Technical Characteristics of his Method in Rayhani Script, (in Arabic), 2018, Jordan Journal of History and Archaeology.
- With others, The Inscriptions of King Abdullah I Mosque and their Relationship with the Place (in Arabic), 2013, Jordan Journal of Arts, 6/3, pp. 379-392.
- With others, Nasta'liq Script, Historic Roots and Artistic Characteristics (in Arabic), 2013, Jordan Journal of Arts, 6/1, pp. 259-278.
- With others, The Inscriptions of al-Aqsa Mosque Minbar (Pulpit), and its Historical and Artistic Significance (in Arabic), 2013, Journal of the Faculty of Archaeology, Cairo University.
- With others, Natural Stone in Jordan: Characteristics, Specifications and Importance in Interior Architecture (in English), American Journal of Scientific Research, 82, 2012, pp. 83–94.
- "A Unique Qur’an Manuscript Copied by Abdullah al-Sayrafi (d. after 746H/1345-6 AD); The Artistic Features of the Calligraphy of Abdullah al-Sayrafi: An Analytical Study” (in Arabic), Jordan Journal of History and Archaeology, 6/1, 2012, pp. 78–104.
- “ A Unique Arabic Manuscript Copied by Yaqut al-Nuri al-Mosuli (d. 618H/1221 AD); Analytical Study of the Artistic Features of Yaqut al- Musili’s Style in Calligraphy" (in Arabic), Jordan Journal of History and Archaeology, 2009, 3/3, pp. 1–32.
