= Gamal Abdel Nasser (disambiguation) =

Gamal Abdel Nasser (1918–1970) was the second President of Egypt 1954–1970.

Gamal Abdel Nasser or Jamal Abdel Nasser may also refer to:

- Gamal Abdel Nasser Museum, Cairo, Egypt
- Gamal Abdel Nasser Mosque, Cairo, Egypt
- ENS Gamal Abdel Nasser, an Egyptian Navy amphibious assault ship
- Tobruk Airport, Libya, previously Gamal Abdel Nasser Airport
  - Gamal Abdel Nasser Airbase
- Gamal Abdel Nasser University of Conakry, Guinea
- Jamal Abdel Nasser Mosque, al-Bireh, West Bank, Palestine
- Jamal Abdel Nasser Street, Gaza, Palestine

== See also ==
- Nasserism, socialist Arab nationalist political ideology based on the thinking of Gamal Abdel Nasser
