= Al Nasr CSC =

Al-Nasr full name Al-Nasr Cultural and Sports Club (Arabic: نادي النصر الثقافي والرياضي) is a Bahraini sports and cultural club. The club's president is Hussain Hammad.

On 15 June 2013, Al Nasr volleyball team won the Bahrain Volleyball Championship title for 2012–2013 against runners-up Al-Ahli.

Al Nasr's football (soccer) team had won the Bahraini Premier League title in 1958–59 championship.
