= David E. Carter =

American businessman and writer (1942–2023)

- Born: David Edward Carter; November 24, 1942
- Died: April 24, 2023 (aged 80)
- Occupations: Businessman; writer

David Edward Carter (November 24, 1942 – April 23, 2023) was an American businessman and writer on graphic design, logo design, and corporate branding. He wrote many books on trademark and logo design and won a number of regional Emmys for his local television productions. After moving to Sanibel Island, Carter had teamed with Pfeifer Realty Group owner Eric Pfeifer to make several historical documentaries about Sanibel Island, including Sanibel Before the Causeway and Postcards and Pictures from Sanibel.

Carter died on April 23, 2023, at age 80.
