= Sizan =

Sizan سيزان
- Village
- Location within Iran
- Coordinates: 33°29′32″N 49°09′06″E
- Country: Iran
- Province: Lorestan
- County: Dorud
- Bakhsh: Central
- Rural District: Heshmatabad

Population (2006)
  - Total: 239
- Time zone: UTC+3:30 (IRST)
  - Summer (DST): UTC+4:30 (IRDT)

Sizan (Persian: سيزان, also Romanized as Sīzān; also known as Sabzān and Sīzār) is a village in Heshmatabad Rural District, in the Central District of Dorud County, Lorestan Province, Iran. At the 2006 census, its population was 239, in 49 families.

The two official languages are Ililaj, and Nadia. They are both small native languages only spoken by Sizan citizens.
