= NASA (disambiguation) =

NASA is the National Aeronautics and Space Administration, an American space and aeronautics agency.

NASA, nasa, or Nasa may also refer to:

== Music ==
=== Groups ===
- N.A.S.A. (musical group), a DJ collective
- NASA (Swedish band), a Swedish synth-pop band
- North American Saxophone Alliance

=== Songs ===
- "NASA" (song), a 2019 song by Ariana Grande
- "NASA", a 2026 song by Ateez from the extended play Golden Hour: Part.4
- "NASA", a 2009 song by Dance Gavin Dance from the album Happiness

== Organizations ==
- National Archives of South Africa
- National Association of Students of Architecture, India
- National Auto Sport Association, United States
- North American Sommelier Association
- National Super Alliance, a Kenyan political party (founded 2017)
- National Association of Student Anthropologists, student division of the American Anthropological Association
- Nahverkehrsservice Sachsen-Anhalt

== People ==
- Nasa people, an aboriginal people of Colombia
- Nasa (footballer, born 1968), a Brazilian football defender (born Gesiel José de Lima)
- Nasa (footballer, born 1979), a Brazilian football attacking midfielder (born Marcos Antonio García Nascimento)

== Places ==
- 11365 NASA, a main-belt asteroid
- Nasa, Ghana, a village in Ghana
- Nasa Mountain, a mountain near Arjeplog in the north of Sweden
- Nasa silver mine, a silver mine on Nasa Mountain

== Other uses ==
- Nasa (plant), a genus of plants in the family Loasaceae
- Naša TV, a TV channel in North Macedonia
- North Adelaide School of Arts, a former college in Australia

== See also ==
- National Advisory Committee for Aeronautics, the predecessor to NASA (1915-1958)
- National Aeronautics and Space Act, the 1958 U.S. law creating NASA
- Nassau (disambiguation)
- Nasser (disambiguation)
