= Naser Albokat =

Iranian footballer

Personal information
- Full name: Naser Albokat
- Place of birth: Iran
- Position: Midfielder

Team information
- Current team: Sanat Naft Abadan F.C.
- Number: 30

Youth career
- Sanat Naft Abadan F.C.

Senior career*
Years	Team	Apps	(Gls)
2011–	Sanat Naft Abadan F.C.	3	(0)
- * Club domestic league appearances and goals

Naser Albokat (Persian: ناصر آلبوکات) is an Iranian footballer who plays for Sanat Naft Abadan F.C. in the IPL.
