= Mansur Abdulin =

Soviet soldier

Mansur Gizatulovich Abdulin (Russian: Мансур Гизатулович Абдулин; 14 September 1923 – 2007) was a Soviet memoirist and soldier who was decorated for his efforts during World War II.

Born in Anzherka, Kemerovo Oblast in 1923, Abdulin worked as a gold miner before the war. He entered the army as a volunteer after the attack by Nazi Germany on Soviet Union. He fought in the Battle of Stalingrad as a member of the 1034th Rifle Regiment of the 293rd Rifle Division, which was renamed as the 66th Guards Rifle Division on Jan. 21, 1943. He later fought in the Battle of Kursk and battles on the Dniepr River, where he was wounded in the leg and later discharged from service. He served as a member of a mortar crew and an infantryman and received the Order of The Patriotic War 1st Class, Order of the Red Star and Medal "For Valour".

In 1985, he published 160 страниц из солдатского дневника (160 pages from the diary of a soldier), which was based on his diary. In it, he detailed his experience in the way that includes fierce fighting on the Eastern Front in WW2, and the life of a Red Army soldier in that period.

After recovery from the wounds, he returned to his mining profession. After the war, he wrote Red Road from Stalingrad (ISBN 1-84415-145-X) which was published in English in 2004.

Abdulin was a resident of Orenburg Oblast until his death in 2007.
