= Azrag =

Azrag ازرگ
- Village
- Location within Iran
- Coordinates: 31°18′24″N 48°24′09″E
- Country: Iran
- Province: Khuzestan
- County: Ahvaz
- Bakhsh: Hamidiyeh
- Rural District: Jahad

Population (2006)
  - Total: 274
- Time zone: UTC+3:30 (IRST)
  - Summer (DST): UTC+4:30 (IRDT)

Azrag (Persian: ازرگ, also known as Azrak, Azrak-e Yek, Azraq, and Azraq Hashish) is a village in Jahad Rural District, Hamidiyeh District, Ahvaz County, Khuzestan Province, Iran. At the 2006 census, its population was 274, in 43 families.
