= Sabzan, Kerman =

Sabzan سبزان
- Village
- Location within Iran
- Coordinates: 28°03′49″N 57°18′26″E
- Country: Iran
- Province: Kerman
- County: Faryab
- Bakhsh: Central
- Rural District: Mehruiyeh

Population (2006)
  - Total: 286
- Time zone: UTC+3:30 (IRST)
  - Summer (DST): UTC+4:30 (IRDT)

Sabzan (Persian: سبزان, also Romanized as Sabzān) is a village in Mehruiyeh Rural District, in the Central District of Faryab County, Kerman Province, Iran. At the 2006 census, its population was 286, in 64 families.
