= Naser (name) =

Nusayr
- Romanization: Nusayr
- Gender: masculine
- Language: Arabic:نصیر

Origin
- Language: Arabic
- Meaning: 'granter of victory', Allah, protector, supporter, victory-maker

Other names
- Alternative spelling: Nusayr, [[Nusair]
- Related names: An-Naseer

Nusayr (Arabic: نصیر, romanized: Naseer, lit. 'granter of victory') is a masculine given name, commonly found in the Arabic and Persian languages. Alternative spellings of this name, possibly due to transliteration include Naseer, Nusayr, or Nusair. People with this name may include:

== Given name ==
- Naser Jason Abdo (born 1990), American convicted terrorist
- Naser Abdollahi (1970–2006), Iranian singer
- Naser Albokat, Iranian footballer
- Naser Aliji (born 1993), Albanian footballer
- Naser Azarkeyvan, Iranian footballer
- Naser Al Bahar (born 1973), Iraqi singer
- Naser Beadini (1962–1992), Yugoslav footballer
- Naser Buftain (born 1979), Kuwaiti taekwondo practitioner
- Naser Cheshmazar (1950–2018), Iranian musician and composer
- Naser Al-Halawi (born 1979), Saudi footballer
- Naser al-Hariri (born 1955), Syrian politician
- Naser Kalantari (born 1982), Iranian mixed martial artist
- Naser Kamalian (born 1931), Iranian medical scholar
- Naser Divan Kazeruni (1874–1942), sheriff of Kazerun, Iran
- Naser Kelmendi (born 1957), Bosnian drug trafficker
- Naser Khader (born 1963), Danish politician
- Naser Toure Mahama (1965–2026), Ghanaian politician
- Naser Maleknia (died 2007), Iranian academic
- Naser Manzuri (born 1953), Iranian novelist and linguist
- Naser Al-Meqlad (born 1982), Kuwaiti sport shooter
- Naser Mestarihi (born 1987), Jordanian musician
- Naser Mohammadkhani (born 1957), Iranian football striker
- Naser Malek Motiei (1930–2018), Iranian actor and director
- Naser Al-Omran (born 1977), Kuwaiti footballer
- Naser Orić (born 1967), Bosnian military officer
- Naser Al-Othman (born 1977), Kuwaiti footballer
- Naser Pourmehdi (born 1959), Iranian footballer
- Naser al-Raas (1983–2016), Canadian political prisoner
- Naser Rugova (born 1970), Kosovan politician
- Naser Sahiti (born 1966), Kosovan professor and rector of the University Prishtina
- Naser Al Sebai (born 1985), Syrian footballer
- Naser Al Shami (born 1982), Syrian boxer
- Naser Makarem Shirazi (born 1927), Iranian cleric
- Naser Al-Sohi (1974–2004), Kuwaiti footballer
- Naser Taher (born 1952), Jordanian businessman
- Naser Tahmasb (1939–2023), Iranian voice actor
- Naser Houshmand Vaziri (1946–2019), Iranian sculptor

== People with the middle name or patronymic ==
- Abdul-Raof Naser Kher (born 1982), Libyan futsal player
- Ahmed Naser Al-Raisi, Emirati military officer

== Surname ==
- Hani Naser (1950–2020), Jordanian-American musician
- M. A. Naser (1921–2004), Bangladeshi educator
- Sumaya Farhat Naser (born 1948), Palestinian peace activist
- Yekta Naser (born 1978), Iranian actress
