= Naser Al Bahar =

Naser Al Bahar نصر البحار
- Born: Naser Al Bahar; October 17, 1973 (age 52)
- Origin: Baghdad, Iraq
- Genres: Classical crossover; pop; world
- Occupations: Musician; composer; singer; songwriter
- Years active: 2008–present
- Labels: Alhaneen Productions; Al-Qethara Productions; Takarub

Naser Al Bahar (Note: Arabic: نصر البحار) (born October 17, 1973) is an Iraqi singer, composer and songwriter.

== Discography ==
=== Singles ===
- 2009: "Tela3t Mneen"
- 2010: "Shasaweelah"
- 2012: "Atob Lelbeet"
- 2013: "La Thelfen Yalhabbabah"
- 2013: "Bali Beek Mashghool" (Feat. Hakim)
- 2013: "La Teroh"
- 2014: "Yel3an Abu Alayam" (Featuring Ali Saber)
- 2016: "Of Mennak"
- 2017: "Ma Rad Ele"
- 2017: "Elghammazah"
- 2017: "3eshrat 3omor"

== See also ==
- List of best-selling music artists
