= Nasira Khatoon =

Former acting VC of University of Karachi

- Education: BSc from APWA College for Women (1983); MSc Zoology from KU (1986); PhD in Parasitology from KU's department of zoology (1994)
- Organization: University of Karachi
- Known for: first woman VC Karachi University
- Office: VC, Karachi University
- Term: 2 March 2022 to 28 July 2022
- Predecessor: Khalid M. Iraqi interim
- Successor: Khalid M. Iraqi

Nasira Khatoon is a professor, dean of faculties of science and engineering, and the first acting vice chancellor of University of Karachi, in Pakistan. She is the current chief editor of Pakistan Journal of Parasitology.

She is the first scientist to identify a parasite, the Accanthocephala (commonly referred to as the "thorn-headed worm") in the catfish (khagga), an edible fish found in the Arabian Sea along the Pakistan.

== Personal life ==
Nasira Khatoon did her BSc from APWA College for Women in 1983. In 1986, She graduated with MSc degree from the department of zoology, Karachi University. In both BSc and MSc, she scored first divisions. Her PhD in Parasitology from KU's department of zoology was completed in 1994. She specialized in the fields of clinical and veterinary Parasitology and Pathology, and Fish Pathology.

== Career ==
Khatoon started her career as a museum assistant in Karachi University, on June 6, 1987. She remained in position till March 1, 1988. On April 30, 1989, she joined Zoology department as a cooperative teacher, and remained in the position till her appointment as an ad-hoc lecturer by department, in March 1990. And in March 1994, she became assistant professor. She went on to become associate professor and professor in January 2000 and November 2005 respectively. She became chairperson department of zoology on October 25, 2019, till November 3, 2020.

In February 2022, she became first acting VC of University of Karachi, after being notified by the universities and boards department of the Sindh. She was first lady to hold office of VC Karachi University, in last 71 years. Her tenure ended on July 28, 2022.

As of 2022, she has supervised 7 PhDs and 3 MPhils. She has co-written 35 books and published 190 research papers in international and national journals. She is also current chief editor of Pakistan Journal of Parasitology.
