= Kalateh-ye Nasir =

Kalateh-ye Nasir كلاته نصير
- Village
- Location within Iran
- Coordinates: 33°46′17″N 59°02′11″E
- Country: Iran
- Province: South Khorasan
- County: Qaen
- Bakhsh: Central
- Rural District: Qaen

Population (2006)
  - Total: 252
- Time zone: UTC+3:30 (IRST)
  - Summer (DST): UTC+4:30 (IRDT)

Kalateh-ye Nasir (Persian: كلاته نصير, also Romanized as Kalāteh-ye Naşīr; also known as Nasīrābād and Naşīr) is a village in Qaen Rural District, in the Central District of Qaen County, South Khorasan Province, Iran. At the 2006 census, its population was 252, in 61 families.
