= Nasira Akhter =

Indian inventor (born 1972)

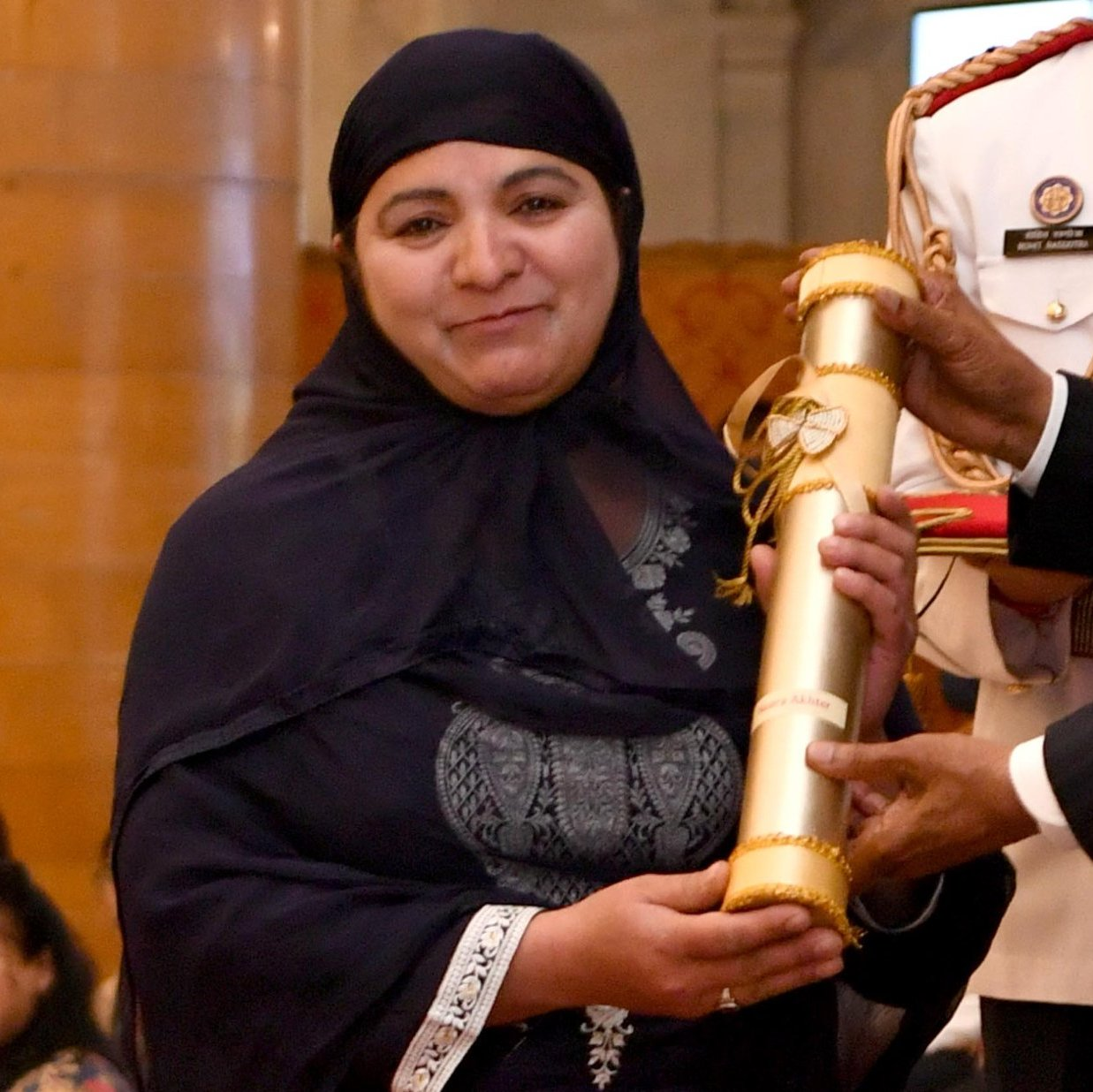
- Nasira Akhter
- Born: 1 February 1972 (age 54)
- Awards: Nari Shakti Puraskar

Nasira Akhter (born 1 February 1972) is an Indian inventor from Kulgam in Jammu and Kashmir. She dropped out of school and became interested in the uses of herbs. Akhter worked at the Kashmir University Science Instrumentation Centre for over eight years to develop a means to make polythene biodegradable. She found a solution using an undisclosed herb in 2008. The herb is made into a paste and this is applied to the polythene before it is set alight. The polythene is disposed of without any reported pollution. In recognition of her achievements, she received the Nari Shakti Puraskar on International Women's Day 2022 from the President of India Ram Nath Kovind.
