= Nasser, Gaza City =

Nasser الناصر Naser, Nasr
- Neighborhood
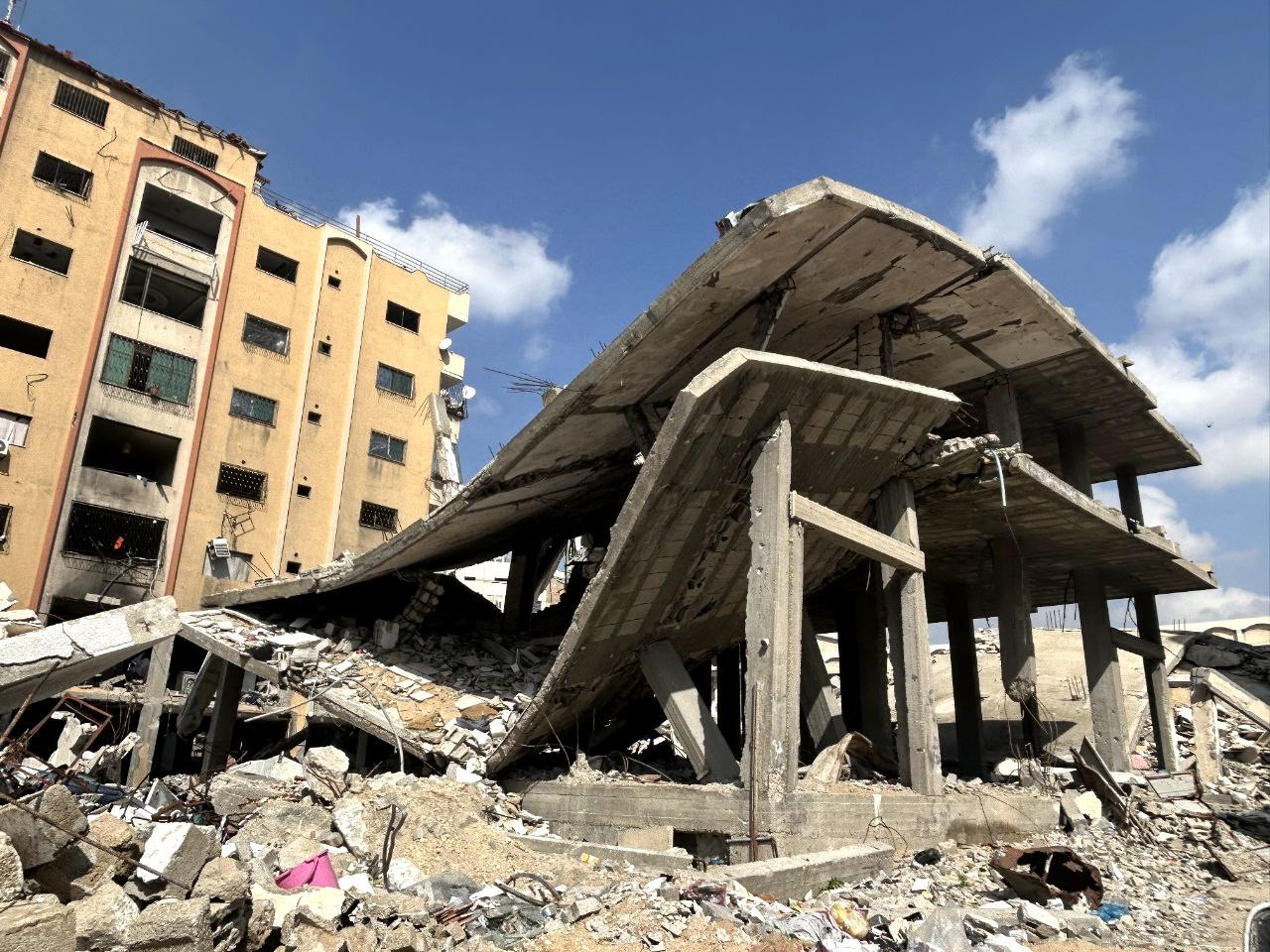
- Nasser in 2025
- Interactive map of Nasser
- Coordinates: 31°32′2.5″N 34°27′34.58″E
- Country: Palestine
- Governorate: Gaza Governorate
- City: Gaza
- Time zone: UTC+2 (EET)
  - Summer (DST): +3

Nasser or Hayy al-Nasr is a district in western Gaza City, located adjacent to Rimal and northwest of al-Daraj. It was established in 1957 while the Gaza Strip was under Egyptian control to house the families of soldiers and local volunteers who fought against Israel in the 1948 Palestine War. It was named after the late Egyptian president Gamal Abdel Nasser.

== Bibliography ==
- Shahin, Mariam (2005). Palestine: A Guide. Interlink Books. ISBN 1-56656-557-X.
