= Nowabad Rural District =

Rural district in Khuzestan province, Iran

Nowabad Rural District Persian: دهستان نوآباد
- Rural District
- Location within Iran
- Coordinates: 29°59′32″N 48°38′09″E
- Country: Iran
- Province: Khuzestan
- County: Abadan
- District: Arvandkenar
- Capital: Abtar

Population (2016)
  - Total: 129
- Time zone: UTC+3:30 (IRST)

Nowabad Rural District (Persian: دهستان نوآباد) is in Arvandkenar District of Abadan County, Khuzestan province, Iran. Its capital is the village of Abtar. The previous capital of the rural district was the village of Alam (علم).

== Demographics ==
=== Population ===
At the time of the 2006 National Census, the rural district's population was 174 in 39 households. There were 148 inhabitants in 41 households at the following census of 2011. The 2016 census measured the population of the rural district as 129 in 40 households. The most populous of its 18 villages was Nahr-e Hajji Mohammad, with 56 people.
