= Nasir, Shushtar =

Nasir نصير
- Village
- Location within Iran
- Coordinates: 31°53′00″N 48°59′00″E
- Country: Iran
- Province: Khuzestan
- County: Shushtar
- Bakhsh: Central
- Rural District: Miyan Ab-e Shomali

Population (2006)
  - Total: 287
- Time zone: UTC+3:30 (IRST)
  - Summer (DST): UTC+4:30 (IRDT)

Nasir (Persian: نصير, also Romanized as Nasīr) is a village in Miyan Ab-e Shomali Rural District, in the Central District of Shushtar County, Khuzestan Province, Iran. At the 2006 census, its population was 287, in 50 families.
