= Nasr (name) =

- Romanization: Naṣr
- Gender: masculine
- Language: Arabic: نصر

Origin
- Language: Arabic
- Meaning: 'victory'

Other names
- Alternative spelling: Nassr
- Related names: Nasrallah, Nasralla, Nasrollah, Nasrullah, Al-Nasrallah

Nasr (Arabic: نصر, romanized: Naṣr, lit. 'victory') is a given name and surname, more common as a surname, in the Arabic language. The surname is used by both, Arab Muslims and Arab Christians particularly in the Levant. It may refer to:

== Mononym ==
- Nasr I (died 892), Samanid amir ruled 864–892
- Nasr II (906–943), Samanid amir, ruled 914–943
- Nasr, Sultan of Granada (1287–1322), in the Nasrid dynasty

== Given name ==
- Nasr Abdel Aziz Eleyan (born 1941), Jordanian-Palestinian artist, television interior designer/producer
- Nasr Abu Zayd (1943–2010), Egyptian Qur'anic thinker
- Nasr Al-Madhkur, 18th century local governor of what was described by a contemporary account as an "independent state" of Bushire and Bahrain
- Nasra Ali Abukar (born 2003) Somali female athlete
- Nasr al-Hariri (born 1977), Syrian politician
- Nasr El Hag Ali, the first vice chancellor of the University of Khartoum
- Nasr ibn Sayyar (663–748), Arab general and the last Umayyad governor of Khurasan in 738–748
- Nasr ibn Shabath al-Uqayli, early 9th-century rebel leader in the Jazira
- Nasr Javed (born 1963), Kashmiri senior operative of the militant group Lashkar-e-Taiba

== Middle name ==
- Alireza Nasr Azadani (born 1985), Iranian taekwondo player

== Surname ==
- Abu Yaqub Yusuf an-Nasr (died 1307), Marinid ruler of Morocco
- Ali Nasr (1891–1961), Iranian dramatist and playwright
- Bassem Nasr (born 1981), Lebanese-born Swedish politician
- Farouk Seif Al Nasr (1922–2009), Egyptian politician
- Felipe Nasr (born 1992), Brazilian racing driver
- Ghassan Nasr, academic and translator
- Rebeca Monroy Nasr, Mexican writer and researcher
- Hassan Mustafa Osama Nasr (born 1963), Egyptian cleric who was living in asylum in Italy until being allegedly abducted by the CIA
- Kamila Nasr, Canadian singer, composer and multi-instrumentalist based in Beijing
- May Nasr (born 1965), Lebanese singer, musician and microfinancing consultant
- Mahmoud Nasr, Egyptian cinematographer
- Mahmoud Abo El-Nasr (born 1953), Egyptian engineering professor, politician and minister
- Muhammad Hamid Abu al-Nasr (1913–1996), a General Guide of the Egyptian Muslim Brotherhood
- Octavia Nasr (born 1966), Lebanese-American journalist
- Ramsey Nasr (born 1974), Dutch-Palestinian author and actor
- Rasha Nasr (born 1992), Syrian-German politician
- Said Al Nasr (born 1955), Syrian Palestinian, convicted in Belgium in 1980 for terrorism
- Salah Nasr (1920–1982), head of the Egyptian General Intelligence Directorate from 1957 to 1967
- Saleh Nasr (born 1999), Egyptian football player
- Seyyed Hossein Nasr (born 1933), Iranian professor in the department of Islamic studies at George Washington University
- Suad Nasr (1953–2007), Egyptian stage, television, and film actress
- Vali Reza Nasr (born 1960), Iranian-born U.S. academic and scholar teaching at the Naval Postgraduate School
- Yasman Malek-Nasr (also spelt Yassamin Maleknasr, born 1955), Iranian filmmaker and actress

== See also ==
- Nasr (disambiguation)
- Naser (disambiguation)
- Nasser (disambiguation)
