= Minubar Rural District =

Rural district in Khuzestan province, Iran

Minubar Rural District Persian: دهستان مينوبار
- Rural District
- Location within Iran
- Coordinates: 30°07′18″N 48°26′35″E
- Country: Iran
- Province: Khuzestan
- County: Abadan
- District: Arvandkenar
- Capital: Kut-e Shannuf

Population (2016)
  - Total: 10,574
- Time zone: UTC+3:30 (IRST)

Minubar Rural District (Persian: دهستان مينوبار) is in Arvandkenar District of Abadan County, Khuzestan province, Iran. Its capital is the village of Kut-e Shannuf.

== Demographics ==
=== Population ===
At the time of the 2006 National Census, the rural district's population was 9,800 in 1,927 households. There were 10,052 inhabitants in 2,518 households at the following census of 2011. The 2016 census measured the population of the rural district as 10,574 in 3,003 households. The most populous of its 21 villages was Albu Hamid, with 1,793 people.
