= Naseer =

- Romanization: Naseer
- Gender: masculine
- Language: Arabic:نصیر

Origin
- Language: Arabic نصیر
- Meaning: 'granter of victory', Allah, protector, supporter, victory-maker

Other names
- Alternative spelling: Nusair, Nusayr
- Related names: An-Naseer, Nasralla, Nasrollah, Nasrullah, Al-Naseer

Naseer (Arabic: نصیر, romanized: Naseer, lit. 'granter of victory, victorious, Allah') is a masculine given name and surname of Arabic origin. Notable people with the name include:

== Given name ==
- Naseer Abdullah (born 1956), Indian model and actor
- Naseer Ahmad (born 1995), Afghan cricketer
- Naseer Ahmed (politician), Pakistani politician
- Naseer Ahmed (wrestler) (born 1972), Pakistani wrestler
- Naseer Akram (born 1984), Pakistani cricketer
- Naseer Aruri (1934–2015), American professor
- Naseer Ahmad Bhutta, Pakistani politician
- Naseer Bunda (1932–1993), Pakistani field hockey player
- Naseer al-Chaderchi (1936–2026), Iraqi politician
- Naseer Faiq (born 1985), Afghan diplomat
- Naseer Ahmad Faruqui (1906–1991), Pakistani Ahmadiyya Islamic scholar
- Naseer Islam (born 1972), Pakistani-American cricketer
- Naseer Ismail (born 1975), Maldivian athlete
- Naseer Jamali (born 1989), Afghan-American cricketer
- Naseer Khan (born 1972), Pakistani cricketer
- Naseer Ahmad Khan (born 1938), Indian politician and social worker
- Naseer Ahmad Khan (scholar) (1918–2010), Indian Islamic scholar
- Naseer Ahmed Khan (1936–2020), Pakistani tribal chief, social activist, and philanthropist
- Naseer Ahmed Khandowa (born 1974), Pakistani politician
- Naseer Khan Khosa (died 2020), Pakistani politician
- Naseer Ahmad Malhi (1911–1991), Pakistani politician
- Naseer Malik (1950–1999), Pakistani cricketer
- Naseer Mengal, Pakistani politician
- Naseer Sankranthi (born 1968), Indian actor
- Naseer Shamma (born 1963), Iraqi musician and oud player
- Naseeruddin Shah (born 1950), Indian actor
- Naseer Shaukat (born 1966), Pakistani cricketer
- Naseer Soomro (1969/70–2025), Pakistani giant
- Naseer Turabi (1945–2021), Pakistani poet
- Naseer Ahamed Zainulabdeen (born 1961), Sri Lankan politician

== Surname ==
- Mukhthar Naseer (born 1979), Maldivian footballer
- Munir Bin Naseer, Pakistani extrajudicial prisoners of the United States
- Umar Naseer (born 1967), Maldivian politician

== See also ==
- Naseer (name)
