= Nasar Rural District =

Rural district in Khuzestan province, Iran

Nasar Rural District Persian: دهستان نصار
- Rural District
- Location within Iran
- Coordinates: 30°03′39″N 48°40′18″E
- Country: Iran
- Province: Khuzestan
- County: Abadan
- District: Arvandkenar
- Capital: Abu Abud

Population (2016)
  - Total: 5,585
- Time zone: UTC+3:30 (IRST)

Nasar Rural District (Persian: دهستان نصار) is in Arvandkenar District of Abadan County, Khuzestan province, Iran. Its capital is the village of Abu Abud.

== Demographics ==
=== Population ===
At the time of the 2006 National Census, the rural district's population was 5,275 in 1,067 households. There were 5,102 inhabitants in 1,366 households at the following census of 2011. The 2016 census measured the population of the rural district as 5,585 in 1,590 households. The most populous of its 30 villages was Nahr-e Abu Felfel, with 473 people.
