= Arvandkenar District =

District in Khuzestan province, Iran

Arvandkenar District Persian: بخش اروندکنار
- District
- Location within Iran
- Coordinates: 30°03′57″N 48°38′20″E
- Country: Iran
- Province: Khuzestan
- County: Abadan
- Capital: Arvandkenar

Population (2016)
  - Total: 27,461
- Time zone: UTC+3:30 (IRST)

Arvandkenar District (Persian: بخش اروندکنار) is in Abadan County, Khuzestan province, Iran. Its capital is the city of Arvandkenar.

== Demographics ==
=== Population ===
At the time of the 2006 National Census, the district's population was 25,010 in 4,930 households. The following census in 2011 counted 24,211 people in 6,144 households. The 2016 census measured the population of the district as 27,461 inhabitants in 7,789 households.

=== Administrative divisions ===
Arvandkenar District Population
Administrative Divisions	2006	2011	2016
Minubar RD	9,800	10,052	10,574
Nasar RD	5,275	5,102	5,585
Nowabad RD	174	148	129
Arvandkenar (city)	9,761	8,909	11,173
Total	25,010	24,211	27,461
RD = Rural District
