= Abadan County =

County in Khuzestan province, Iran

Abadan County Persian: شهرستان آبادان
- County
- Location of Abadan County in Khuzestan province (bottom left, purple)

- Location of Khuzestan province in Iran
- Coordinates: 30°13′00″N 48°38′15″E
- Country: Iran
- Province: Khuzestan
- Capital: Abadan
- Districts: Central, Arvandkenar

Population (2016)
  - Total: 298,090
- Time zone: UTC+3:30 (IRST)

Abadan County (Persian: شهرستان آبادان) is in Khuzestan province, Iran. Its capital is the city of Abadan, on Abadan Island.

== History ==
After the 2011 National Census, the village of Chavibdeh was elevated to the status of a city.

On May 11, 2020, Iran imposed a COVID-19 lockdown in Abadan County. All shops and offices in the county, except essential services, closed during this period. Authorities also closed access to Abadan from the Ahvaz and Bandar Mahshahr points of entry. These restrictions would expire on May 25.

== Demographics ==
=== Population ===
At the time of the 2006 census, the county's population was 275,126 in 58,870 households. The following census in 2011 counted 271,484 people in 69,946 households. The 2016 census measured the population of the county as 298,090 in 85,015 households.

=== Administrative divisions ===
Abadan County's population history and administrative structure over three consecutive censuses are shown in the following table.

Abadan County Population
Administrative Divisions	2006	2011	2016
Central District	250,116	247,273	270,622
Bahmanshir-e Jonubi RD	8,812	8,189	9,943
Bahmanshir-e Shomali RD	4,017	4,977	5,306
Shalahi RD	19,299	14,111	15,991
Abadan (city)	217,988	212,744	231,476
Chavibdeh (city)		7,252	7,906
Arvandkenar District	25,010	24,211	27,461
Minubar RD	9,800	10,052	10,574
Nasar RD	5,275	5,102	5,585
Nowabad RD	174	148	129
Arvandkenar (city)	9,761	8,909	11,173
Total	275,126	271,484	298,090
RD = Rural District

== See also ==
Media related to Abadan County at Wikimedia Commons
