= InfoCom Corporation =

American web hosting service company

- Type: Defunct
- Industry: Web hosting service
- Founded: 1992
- Headquarters: Dallas, Texas; Richardson, Texas
- Key people: Ghassan Elashi; Bayan Elashi; Ihsan Elashi; Hazim Elashi; Basman Elashi
- Website: infocomusa.com

InfoCom Corporation was an American web hosting service company founded by five brothers in 1992. It was initially based in Dallas, Texas, and before moving to Richardson, Texas. The company was raided on 5 September 2001 and its bank account frozen. Criminal charges were brought on 18 December 2002. On October 13, 2005 InfoCom Corporation was sentenced to two years’ probation resulting in it being shut down due to charges of conspiracy to violate the Export Administration Regulations and the Libyan Sanctions Regulations. Its founding members were also convicted on charges of false statements, money laundering and fundraising on behalf of the U.S.- terrorist designated organization Hamas.

== Company history ==
In 1988 the brothers had founded International Computer & Communications Inc in Los Angeles assembling personal computers in the Middle East as well as providing consulting services. The company had first years sales of $300,000 and by 1995 it had a turnover of $5 million. Following the brothers move to Richardson in 1992 they started the new company InfoCom jointly founded by Bayan Elashi, Ghassan Elashi, Basman Elashi, Hazim and Ihsan “Sammy” Elashi as a family-run business that sold computers and Internet services to customers mostly based in the Middle East. Bayan Elashi was Infocom chief executive officer, Ghassan Elashi was the company vice-president of marketing, while Basman Elashi was the logistics and credit manager. Hazim Elashi served as InfoCom manager of personal computer systems, and Ihsan Elashi was a systems consultant and sales representative.

At its peak, it hosted approximately 500 websites. The company hosted the domain .iq for the country of Iraq as well as websites for Muslim organizations in the United States, including the Holy Land Foundation for Relief and Development, the Islamic Association of Palestine, the Islamic Society of North America, and the Muslim Students Association. The company also hosted websites for entities abroad, including the Qatari television station Al Jazeera, the Qatari newspaper al Sharq, and Birzeit University.

=== Raid and closure ===
In early 2001, the Dallas Morning News first started to publish stories about InfoCom’s suspected ties to Hamas. The FBI had begun surveillance of the HLF in 1994 and launched a criminal investigation into InfoCom 1999. Evidence collected during a raid of the offices of InfoCom Corporation beginning on September 5, 2001 was used to secure InfoCom’s conviction in 2004 on charges of export infringements and of channeling funds to Hamas. The export infringements related to four computers exported to Syria and a printer exported to Malta between 1997 and 2000 which turned up in Libya. The funding charge related to Abu Marzook's wife's investment in the company.

On 5 September 2001 government agents from FBI, US Customs, Secret Service, the IRS, Commerce Department, and local police raided the InfoCom offices. The sealed warrant was signed by a distinct magistrate from Dallas. They confiscated tens of thousands of documents and downloaded the hard drives from over 200 computers. They also raided offices sublet to the Holy Land Foundation and seized documents, video tapes and equipment. The offices where searched for four days and leaks to the media stated it was a terrorism related investigation. In the immediate aftermath the Commerce Department issued a ban on InfoCom shipping goods overseas and froze InfoCom's bank account containing over $100,000.

InfoCom attracted the attention of the U.S. authorities in 1998, when the name of an employee was found among the contact information listed in the address book of Osama bin Laden’s former personal secretary, Wadih el-Hage, discovered by the FBI. The employee concerned, Ghassan Dahduli, ran the Islamic Association for Palestine (IAP), that had been co-founded by Ghassan Elashi.

Both el-Hage and Dahduli lived in Tucson, Arizona, until 1990, when the latter moved to Richardson, Texas, with the IAP office. In 1998 both met again in Texas. The connection between el-Hage and Dahduli prompted the FBI to open an investigation into the Palestinian-American charity the Holy Land Foundation as well as to the terrorist designation of a number of affiliated entities. The Holy Land Foundation for Relief and Development was the largest Islamic charitable group in the U.S. when, on 4 December 2001, it was closed after President George Bush issued an Executive Order designating it a Domestic Terror Organisation. After several trials 5 HLF leaders, including Ghassan Elashi, were sentenced to long terms in prison for providing financial support to Hamas.

In his book, Hamas: Politics, Charity, and Terrorism in the Service of Jihad, Matthew Levitt reported that InfoCom was actively involved in fundraising on behalf of Hamas “but also provided services to Hamas members, front organizations and supporters.” Levitt was used as a prosecution witness in the 2007 trial of the Holy Land Foundation where he appeared as an expert on Hamas despite not being able to speak Arabic or Hebrew and relying on translations of documents provided by the Israeli authorities.

Ghassan Elashi, who served as InfoCom vice-president, was one of the founders and chairman of the Holy Land Foundation for Relief and Development. Ghassan was the founder of the Texas-based chapter of the Council on American–Islamic Relations (CAIR), a Muslim advocacy group. Ghassan was also one of the founders of the Islamic Association of Palestine (IAP), an association that has been accused of raising money for Hamas in the U.S. and which shares founding members and trustees with CAIR.

Ghassan's second cousin is married to Mousa Abu Marzook, a Palestinian senior member of Hamas then serving as a political leader of the U.S.-designated terrorist organization. Marzook himself was listed as a Specially Designated Terrorist by the U.S. Treasury Department in 1995. Nonetheless, Marzook was an investor in InfoCom. FBI criminal investigations ascertained that Abu Marzook invested $150,000 in InfoCom in 1992, while his wife invested $250,000 in 1993.

The corporation, already defunct, was sentenced to two years probation

In July 2004, all five brothers were convicted on charges “they conspired to violate the Export Administration Regulations and the Libyan Sanctions Regulations.” According to U.S. Department of Justice records, all brothers with the exception of Ihsan Elashi were also convicted on money laundering charges. Furthermore, in April 2005 the jury found that Bayan Elashi, Ghassan Elashi, Basman Elashi and Infocom Corporation conspired and transferred funds to Mousa Abu Marzook via his wife's $250,000 investment.

Ihsan Elashi and the company itself remain on the U.S. Department of Commerce's Denied Persons List, with an expiration date of June 29, 2056; the list gives Ihsan Elashi's current address as FCI Seagoville.
