= Philadelphia meeting of the Holy Land Foundation and Islamic Association of Palestine =

1993 meeting in Pennsylvania

In October 1993, members of several Palestinian-American organizations, including the Holy Land Foundation for Relief and Development and the Islamic Association of Palestine, met in Philadelphia, Pennsylvania for three days to discuss the recently signed Oslo Accords. The gathering was surveilled by the Federal Bureau of Investigation. FBI transcripts and recordings of the meeting were later used as evidence in the Holy Land Foundation trials.

== Background ==
The Holy Land Foundation for Relief and Development (HLF) was founded in 1987 by Palestinian-Americans to raise money for charitable zakat committees operating in the West Bank and Gaza. The Islamic Association of Palestine (IAP) was an American pro-Palestinian nonprofit organization, founded in 1981.

The Oslo Accords were signed between Israel and the Palestine Liberation Organization on September 13, 1993. Hamas opposed the agreement, and according to Martyn Frampton, all branches of the Muslim Brotherhood backed its campaign against the peace process. At the Philadelphia meeting, Matthew Levitt writes, participants saw the new Palestinian Authority's weakness in social provision as an opening, and agreed to step into that gap themselves as a way of undercutting the accords.

== Meeting ==
The meeting was held from October 1 to 3, 1993, at a Marriott hotel near Philadelphia's airport. According to an FBI report cited by Matthew Levitt, seventeen attendees took part. Levitt's list of participants, based on FBI records, additionally includes Abdelhaleem Hasan al-Ashqar, Mohammad al-Hanooti, Ismail Elbarasse, Muin Kamel Mohammad Shabib, and HLF executive director Haitham Maghawri.

According to Elashi, the meeting was "open and public" and had been set up to discuss the consequences of the Oslo Accords for Palestinian charitable and political work in the U.S. Discussions were held in Arabic. Participants discussed the Oslo Accords, both their consequences for their work and their opposition to them as inadequate to meet the needs of Palestinians, the zakat committees, and Hamas. In the transcripts, Baker is quoted as saying, "I believe that I as a charity organization should not give an opinion or a political judgment at all."

Participants referred to Hamas as "Samah" (Hamas spelled backwards). Later at trial, the government alleged that this was code to avoid mentioning Hamas by name, though Hamas was not an illegal organization at the time. According to Israeli-American activist Miko Peled, Baker was making a joke when he had asked that "sister Samah" be used. In other evidence introduced at the trial, Baker refers to this as "whimsical" wordplay.

The transcripts also show several speakers stressing the need to present the activities of the American organizations as independent humanitarian or educational initiatives. According to court records, Baker recommended describing the meeting as a "workshop" jointly organized by HLF and IAP.

=== FBI surveillance ===
The meeting was surveilled by the FBI as part of an investigation opened in the early 1990s into several American organizations suspected of ties to Hamas.

Federal authorities obtained authorization to record the participants' conversations, and the discussions were captured in full and later transcribed. The recordings remained confidential for more than a decade before being entered into the record in the Holy Land Foundation case.

== Use in the Holy Land Foundation trials ==
In December 2001, the United States Department of the Treasury labeled the Holy Land Foundation a specially designated global terrorist and the FBI raided their offices. In 2004, the HLF and five of its staff, including Shukri Abu Baker and Ghassan Elashi, were charged with terrorism related offenses. The U.S. government alleged that they were fundraising for Hamas. A 2007 trial resulted in a hung jury, the defendants were convicted in a 2008 retrial. The convictions were upheld on appeal.

In this prosecution, the U.S. government alleged that the HLF, IAP, and the United Association for Studies and Research (UASR) were set up following the start of the First Intifada in 1987 as part of a Muslim Brotherhood linked "Palestine Committee" under the leadership of Mousa Abu Marzook to support Hamas; the HLF for fundraising, the IAP for communications, media, and outreach, and UASR as a think tank.

Transcripts of the meeting were introduced as evidence in both trials. According to the defense, the transcripts had problems with mistranslation and did not always accurately identify who was speaking. According to Peled, the FBI linguist who testified for the government displayed a lack of familiarity with Palestinian Arabic and was the source of many "misunderstandings and mistranslations." Prosecutors used the transcripts to demonstrate that the defendants supported Hamas and intended to derail the Israeli-Palestinian peace process. Nancy Hollander, attorney for the HLF and Baker, mentioned the meeting and Hamas in her opening statement for the defense, asking, "But who knew which organizations were going to be illegal?"

The prosecution argued that the recorded conversations illustrated the relationships between several American organizations and Hamas, as well as the strategy adopted after the Oslo Accords. The transcripts were used alongside numerous other pieces of evidence, including internal Palestine Committee documents, financial records, and trial testimony.

Anthropologist Jonathan Benthall has argued that the 2008 trial left a key question unexamined: whether HLF's donations actually reached Hamas once inside the zakat committee system, as opposed to being used for the purposes donors intended. He regards it as more probable that the committees were genuine charities responding to need during the years HLF supported them.

== Analysis ==
Matthew Levitt, a fellow at the pro-Israel Washington Institute for Near East Policy and government witness at the HLF trial, presents the meeting as an important step in the evolution of what he calls the American support network for Hamas after the Oslo Accords.

Steven Emerson also discusses the meeting as part of his analysis of Hamas support networks in the United States, though without devoting a specific study to it.

== Bibliography ==
- Levitt, Matthew (2006). Hamas: Politics, Charity, and Terrorism in the Service of Jihad. New Haven, CT: Yale University Press. ISBN 978-0-300-12258-9.
