= Quranic Literacy Institute =

Islamic organization based outside of Chicago, Illinois, U.S.

Logo

The Quranic Literacy Institute was a non-profit organization based outside of Chicago, Illinois.

== Activities ==
The Quranic Literacy Institute was established to translate and publish sacred Islamic texts from Arabic to English. Their “Quran Project” was intended to create “an entirely new translation of the Quran based on a careful and scholarly review and analysis of every single word of its more than 6200 verses.”

== Leadership ==
The organization was founded by Islamic scholar Ahmad Zaki Hammad, a previous president of the Islamic Society of North America and board member of the North American Islamic Trust (NAIT). Former NAIT chairman Bassam Osman served as Director.

== Ties to terrorism ==
The Quranic Literacy Institute was allegedly part of a large web of organizations and individuals that were funding terrorist groups. In October 2001 in the wake of 9/11, the U.S. Department of Treasury froze the assets of 38 individuals believed to be involved in terrorist financing. One of the individuals, Yassin Kadi, was a prominent Saudi businessman who was linked to Osama bin Laden and was a terrorism financier through his business ventures and charitable projects. In 1991, Kadi loaned $820,000 to the Quranic Literacy Institute allegedly due to his friendship with the group’s president. While he said that the money was intended to allow them to make a land investment in order to yield profits and support their work, the income was actually given to Mohammad Salah, a high level Hamas military operative who was employed as a computer analyst by the Quranic Literacy Institute. When Salah pleaded guilty to helping Hamas in an Israeli military court in 1995, the U.S. Treasury Department added him as a list of specially designated terrorists. In 1998, when he returned to the Chicago suburbs, the U.S. filed a forfeiture complaint to confiscate $1.4 million in assets that belonged to him and the Quranic Literacy Institute. The $820,000 loaned to the Institute by Kadi was included in the confiscated funds.

The organization was also used to transfer funds by Hamas leader Mousa Abu Marzook, who was working to resurrect the military wing of Hamas. The organization served as a transfer point of funds between Hamas political committee leaders to those tasked with revitalizing the Hamas military wing. This occurred after the mass deportation of Hamas and other terrorists from Gaza and the West Bank to southern Lebanon in 1992.

== Legal Proceedings ==
In 2004, the Quranic Literacy Institute was ruled liable, along with the Holy Land Foundation, and Islamic Association of Palestine, in a $156 million lawsuit for aiding and abetting Hamas in the death of 17-year-old U.S. citizen, David Boim. The decision was later reversed by the 7th US Circuit Court on the grounds that a strong enough link had not been proven between the charitable donations and the death of Boim. In 2008, the court reheard the case en banc, ruling in favor of the Boim Family.
