= Muslim Legal Fund of America =

Islamic organization based in the United States

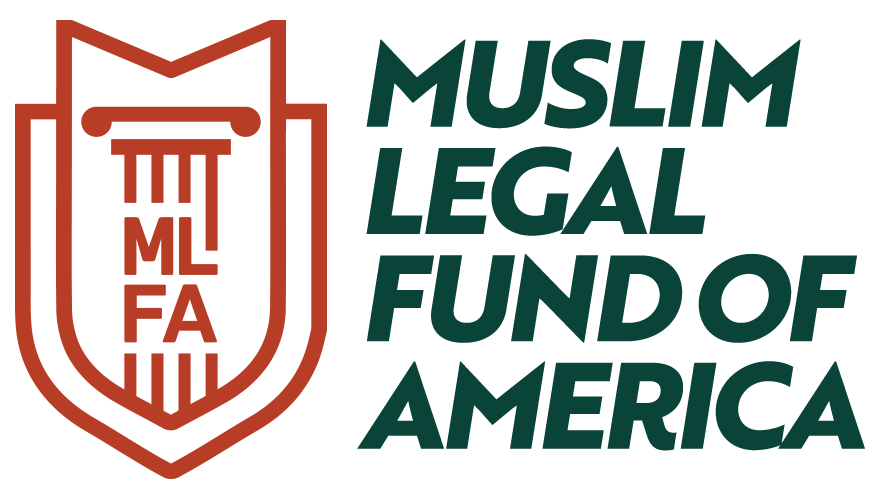
- Type: 501(c)(3) organization
- Tax ID no.: 01-0548371
- Website: mlfa.org

The Muslim Legal Fund of America (MLFA) is an American charity that funds legal work and programs to defend the rights of Muslims in US courtrooms, prisons, and communities.

== Mission ==
The MLFA believes that Muslims in America are subject to unjust prosecutions and unfair trials. They further maintain that excessive sentences, cruel prison conditions, and religious intimidation are acts committed against Muslim prisoners. The MLFA works under the premise that Islam came to establish justice between people; thus the MLFA believes that they have a religious obligation to support and promote justice. Working as a community and pooling collective resources, the MLFA believes that they can make a positive impact on the state of justice for Muslim Americans.

MLFA works on cases that involve constitutional issues such as freedom of religion, speech, double jeopardy, self-incrimination, trial by jury, rights of the accused, illegal searches and seizures, due process, right to legal counsel, excessive bail, and cruel and unusual punishment. In addition, the MLFA will assist with individuals approached by federal law enforcement, particularly when people are approached due to the fact that they are Muslims. However, cases that involve being justifiably fired from a job, domestic issues, denial of benefits, tenant disputes, and state cases are not generally funded by MLFA.

== Funded projects ==
The MLFA's flagship project is the Constitutional Law Center for Muslims in America, which is a nonprofit law firm directed by attorney Charles Swift. The center focuses on two primary missions: (1) "Challenging governmental security measures affecting Muslim communities which encroach upon the constitutional liberties guaranteed to all" and (2) "protecting the rights of Muslim individuals and organizations in the United States to exercise their constitutionally and statutorily protected right to worship."

== Landmark cases ==
The MLFA has been involved in many controversial, high-profile terror finance cases, some of which and have received international attention.

=== Sami Al-Arian ===
In 2003, computer science teacher at the University of Florida, Sami Al-Arian, was arrested as part of a federal terrorism investigation and accused being a leader of the terrorist group Palestinian Jihad. He was acquitted of most charges after pleading guilty, in 2005, to charges of conspiracy to provide, make, or receive funds, goods, or services for the benefit of a terrorist organization. The MLFA used funding to challenge the denial of substantive and procedural due process rights to Dr. Sami.

After his prison sentence, Al-Arian was expected to be deported. However, he was later charged with criminal contempt for refusing to testify in another terror-related case in 2008. After the case was dismissed Al-Arian was deported in 2015.

=== Enaam Arnaout ===
After completing his sentence in 2011 for crimes of racketeering, misusing charity money for boots, uniforms and other equipment for Islamic fighters in Bosnia and Chechnya, the feds argued that Enaam Arnaout should be stripped of his citizenship and deported. The case against Enaam Arnaout involves allegations that Arnaout lied about his past as a fundraiser for Osama bin Laden and other mujahideen fighting in Afghanistan when he applied to become a naturalized U.S. citizen in 1993. The MLFA is currently seeking the return of documents and items seized in raids by the government after malicious government prosecution.

=== The Holy Land 5 ===
The Holy Land Foundation (HLF) was the largest Islamic charity in the U.S. In 2001 the U.S. government deemed it a terrorist organization, seized all of its assets, and shut it down. In 2004, 5 officers and employees (The Holy Land 5) were charged with providing material support to Hamas. On October 22, 2007, after a two-month jury deliberation, Judge A. Joe Fish declared a mistrial because the jury could not deliver unanimous verdicts and failed to convict on a single count brought against the defendants.

One year later, the government retried the case and made several adjustments including dropping charges against some of the defendants, calling new witnesses, and displaying exhibits seized from the Palestinian Authority. On November 24, 2008, the jury convicted five former HLF officials—Mufid Abdulqader, Shukri Abu-Baker, Ghassan Elashi, Mohamed El-Mezain, and Abdelrahman Odeh—of conspiring to provide material support to terrorists. The trial against the Holy Land Foundation was the largest terror-funding trial in U.S. history.

== Affiliations ==
MLFA is a founding member of the U.S. Council of Muslim Organizations (USCMO), an umbrella group of Islamic organizations in the United States.
