= Hajj Essa Hamed =

Palestinian politician (1931–2020)

Al Hajj Essa Hamed Abu-Raji

Head of the Municipality of Silwad
- In office 2009 – 18 December 2020

Personal details
- Born: 1931 Silwad, Palestine
- Died: 18 December 2020 (aged 88–89)

Al Hajj Essa Hamed Abu-Raji (US ^{i}/al haǧǧ ːˈissa ha'amid / abou raajee /; Arabic: الحج عيسا ابو خَليل 1931 - December 18, 2020) was the head of the Municipality of Silwad. Hamed was elected as head in 2009, 46 years after serving as the trustee for the village.

== Early life and career ==
Essa Hamed was born on 1931 in Silwad, Palestine, years prior to the Arab-Israeli War. Hamed is known for his extensive knowledge of Sharia, as a result, many villagers approach Hamed for guidance for settling disputes. Hamed is praised by Silwadi citizens for his use of Islamic Law when advising on public and private matters.

== Issues with the IDF ==
In mid-2015, 5 IDF soldiers monitored a protest from Silwadi citizens on land owned by Hamed. As the 76-year-old Hamed and his relative approached the soldiers to peacefully protest their presence on his land, he was struck in the abdomen by one of the IDF soldiers. Later, the soldiers left the property. Hamed has since recovered from his injuries.

== Notable information ==
"Al Hajj" is title given to any Muslim who has made the Islamic pilgrimage to Mecca to perform Hajj. "Al Hajj" literally translates into "The one who completed Hajj", which is why natives of Silwad officially refer to Essa Hamed "Al Hajj Essa Hamed."
