= Ghassan Elashi =

Palestinian-American activist

Ghassan Elashi (born 19 December 1953) is a Palestinian-American businessman who was sentenced to prison in 2008 for his work with the Holy Land Foundation, a group that was designated by the United States as a terrorist organization in 2001. At the time, Elashi served as vice president of InfoCom Corporation, an internet company based in Richardson, Texas.

== Holy Land Foundation ==
In 1990, Elashi, along with Shukri Baker and Mohammad Elmazain, founded the charitable group Holy Land Foundation for Relief and Development (HLF). As a charity, its mission was to provide aid for Palestinians in the West Bank, Gaza Strip, Lebanon and Jordan. Following Israel's deportation of 413 Palestinians across the Lebanese border in December 1992 the HLF provided food and tents for their hillside encampment. In 1995 the HLF expanded its relief work to other areas including Bosnia, Albania (where their bakery supplied bread for US troops), Chechnya, Turkey and parts of Africa. The HLF was the first Texas-based group to send funds to Oklahoma following the 19 April 1995 bombing, as well as blood donations and fifty volunteers fundraising. During the years 2000–2001 the HLF raised $13,000,000, making it the largest Muslim charity in the US. On 4 December 2001 President George W. Bush issued Executive Order 13224 closing the HLF. On 27 July 2004 Ghassan Elashi along with other senior members of the HLF were arrested in a dawn raids by the FBI.

The five Elashi brothers were arrested 18 December 2002 and charged with violating Export Administration Regulations and dealing with the property of Special Designated Terrorists. The export violation referred to 4 computers and a printer that had been found in Libya. The second charge referred to a $250,000 investment belonging to Ghassan's second cousin who was married to a Hamas leader. Ghassan was released with restrictions on his movements, his brothers, who were not US citizens, were held in solitary confinement for 18 months.

In a second trial that concluded in November 2008 (the first had ended in a mistrial), Elashi was convicted of terrorism financing crimes related to financial dealings with the Palestinian group, Hamas. He and his co-defendants contended that the Holy Land Foundation funded only legitimate humanitarian projects in Palestinian territories.

=== Conviction ===
In 2004, Elashi and two of his brothers were convicted for illegally shipping computer technology to Syria and Libya, while they were U.S. State Department-designated state sponsors of terrorism. On 13 October 2006, Elashi was sentenced to seven years in prison. The first Holy Land Foundation trial ended in a mistrial in 2007, but Elashi and his codefendants were convicted after a retrial in November 2008. In 2009, Elashi was sentenced to 65 years in prison on federal charges of funneling 12 million dollars to Hamas.

Elashi was originally housed at Federal Correctional Institution, Seagoville, to allow the convicted men to stay in the Dallas/Fort Worth Metroplex so the convicts could aid their lawyers with their appeals. On 20 April 2010, U.S. District Judge Jorge Solis ended the requirement, facilitating their move to more secure facilities. In addition the men were required to speak English when talking with outsiders. Elashi was moved to a more secure prison in Illinois. Elashi, Federal Bureau of Prisons #29687-177, is serving his sentence at Federal Correctional Institution, Beaumont.

=== Response ===
The non-governmental organization Charity & Security Network has charged that the convictions send a "chilling message" to US NGOs, in part because they are uncertain how to determine which charities are acceptable. One indication of that uncertainty, the group states, is that the charitable committees that Holy Land was convicted of working with were never "placed on the U.S. government's list of organizations supporting terrorism." In 2018, activist Miko Peled published this book, Injustice: The Story of the Holy Land Foundation Five, where he catalogs the trial of the criminalization and dismantling of the Holy Land Foundation for Relief and Development, leading to the arrest and jailing of Foundation Elashi, President Shukri Abu Baker, Mohammad el-Mezain, Mufid Abdulqader and Abdulraham Odeh. According to Peled, "American justice […] can convict a hundred innocents for one who is guilty". The families of Elashi and Shukri Abubaker maintain that their convictions were wrong and that they have suffered unjust long-term imprisonment. Human Rights Watch has condemned the trial as it was based on hearsay evidence and called on the Biden administration to release all 5 accused.

== Personal life ==
Ghassan Elashi was born on 19 December 1953 in a suburb of Gaza City. In 1958 he moved to Riyadh where his father was working for the Riyadh Bank. After one year in a local school he was sent to a boarding school in Egypt for a year before returning to Gaza City to live with his grandparents. In June 1967 he was visiting his parents when the war broke out. Unable to return to Gaza he finished his education in Cairo. In 1972 he was able to visit Gaza on a tourist visa. In 1978 he enrolled in the ESL school, Cleveland, Ohio, and then studied accounting at Kent State University. While there he established their first Muslim Student Organisation. A year later he transferred to the University of Miami where he completed his master's degree in accounting in 1981. In March 1985 he married Majida, from Yatta, with whom he had three daughters and three sons. The couple moved to Los Angeles where he and his brother founded a company, International Computer and Communications Inc. In 1988 the company had annual sales of $300,000 and by 1995 sales had grown to almost $5 million.

In 1992 the family moved to Richardson, Dallas where the brothers started a new company, InfoCom. Amongst InfoCom's contracts was one for streaming al-Jazeera TV Arabic channel and hosting their website.

== See also ==
- Mousa Abu Marzook
