= Caroline Valenta =

American photojournalist

- Born: May 27, 1924; Shiner, Texas, U.S.
- Died: February 20, 2013 (aged 88); Westhampton, New York, U.S.
- Other name: Caroline Valenta Gatewood
- Occupations: Photographer, photojournalist

Caroline Valenta (May 27, 1924 – February 20, 2013) was an American photojournalist who worked at the Houston Post, and was nominated for a Pulitzer Prize for her photographs of the 1947 Texas City disaster.

== Early life and education ==
Valenta was born in 1924 in Shiner, Texas, the daughter of John E. Valenta and Lillie Wacker Valenta. Her father was a garage mechanic. She attended the University of Houston, but left in 1945, at the end of her senior year, to take a full-time staff photographer position at the Houston Post. She drove a 1929 Ford Model A when she was a young woman, including on a 1945 vacation with two friends. She attended a short course on news photography at Kent State University in 1946.

== Career ==
Valenta was the first woman photographer employed by the Houston Post, where she worked for eight years starting in 1945. Valenta's 1945 photograph of an America serviceman reuniting with his wife and young children at a train station was printed in newspapers nationwide, and won an award from Encyclopedia Britannica for non-war news photography. In 1946 she had a publicized physical confrontation with three "camera shy" Texas Rangers at a courthouse. She gained further international recognition and a Pulitzer Prize nomination in 1947, for her photographs of the Texas City disaster. Another assignment involved capturing daily life in Seagoville Federal Prison. Her work was included in the 1949 exhibition The Exact Instant at the Museum of Modern Art in New York. She moved to New York in 1952, and worked for the New York Daily News and various other publications.

== Personal life and legacy ==
Valenta married newspaper editor Worth Gatewood and had seven children. She held a camera while giving birth in 1957, and photographed her own daughter's first moments. She died from pancreatic cancer in Westhampton, New York, in 2013, at the age of 88. Her work is included in the collection of the Museum of Fine Arts Houston.
