= Mufid Abdulqader =

Palestinian activist (born 1960)

- Born: 1960 (age 65–66); Silwad
- Occupation: Engineer

Mufid Abdulqader (Arabic: مفيد عبد القادر) is a former Dallas Public Works and Transportation Department engineer and investor who was sentenced to 20 years in prison for raising funds for the Holy Land Foundation for Relief and Development. His family claimed his innocence, and demanded his release. Human Rights Watch called on the Biden administration to release the five accused.

== Early life and education ==
Abdulqader was born in 1960 in the village of Silwad which was the under Jordanian control. Abdulqader's half-brother is Khaled Mashal, who later became the leader of Hamas and stepped down as Hamas' politburo chief in 2017. Together with Mashal, Abdulqader's father moved the family to Kuwait for financial reasons. Abdulqader and his half-brother Khaled completed high school there.

== Career ==
Mufid won praise from Dallas Mayor Laura Miller during his tenure as a "rising star" in the Dallas Public Works and Transportation Department, where he worked on street design and sidewalk projects, and led the $4.8 million Bishop Arts District redevelopment in 2001. By September 2003, he was Senior Project Manager. Before Dallas, he worked at the Oklahoma Department of Transportation from 1988 to 1996.

Mufid performed for the band Al Sakhra ("The Rock"). It performed "stridently anti-Semitic" songs on coast-to-coast tours in the United States. In addition to singing, Mufid performed skits on stage. His band was afterwards called Al Nojoum.

=== Investments ===
Together with co-worker Mohammad Elyazgi, Abdulqader was a co-owner of Sinbad Greek & International Food in Oklahoma.

== Holy Land Foundation ==
According to a book published by Oxford University Press, Abdulqader was a "top fundraiser" for the Holy Land Foundation, and was described by The New York Times as a "leader" of it.

== Conviction, incarceration, and release ==
In September 2008, prosecutors asked the judge for the dismissal of 29 counts each against Abdulqader and Abdulrahman Odeh, keeping only three conspiracy counts.

On October 29, 2012, the United States Supreme Court denied a petition for writ of certiorari, thus making Abdulqader's conviction final and definitive. Nonetheless, the American Human Rights Council in 2017 asked for Mufid Abdulqader's conviction, as well as others, to be commuted to time already served by then-president Barack Obama.

A 2011 NPR report claimed Abdulqader is imprisoned in a highly restrictive Communications management unit in Terre Haute, Indiana.

In 2018 Miko Peled published the book, Injustice: The Story of the Holy Land Foundation Five, where he catalogs the trial of the criminalization and dismantling of the Holy Land Foundation for Relief and Development, leading to the arrest and jailing of Foundation President Shukri Abu Baker, Chairman Ghassan Elashi, Mohammad el-Mezain, Mufid Abdulqader and Abdulraham Odeh. In 2022 his daughter, Nida Abu Baker along with the Thursday by Within Our Lifetime, the Coalition for Civil Freedoms and Samidoun called for his release along with other Palestinians imprisoned by the US government.

Human Rights Watch claimed the trial was based on hearsay evidence and called on the Biden administration to release all five accused.

On December 12, 2024, Mufid Abdulqader was released from Seagoville, TX Federal Correctional Institution after 16 years of imprisonment.
