= Silwad Camp =

Coordinates: 31°58′06″N 35°15′42″E

Silwad Camp (Arabic: مخيم سلواد), is a Palestinian refugee camp north-east of Ramallah, was established in 1972. The transfer took place in the form of the restructuring of the Nuseirat, Shati and Bureij refugee camps in Gaza. The camp had a population of 456 in 2017.

== Construction ==
The Canadian government built the Silwad camp, beginning with a few small houses for a total of 350 inhabitants. The camp, which is now home to 600 refugees, would have continued to expand had building efforts not stopped as a result of a disagreement between the Israeli and the Canadian governments.

== Start ==
The Silwad camp sits on ten acres of land that belonged to the Jordanian Government, which had purchased it from the residents of the town of Silwad in 1952 to establish a military post. The camp is now home to 70 families, displaced in 1948 from Jaffa, Al-Lod and Al-Ramleh.

== Utilities ==
The refugees came to the new land and new homes, which although new, were small and humble and lacked water, electricity and basic services. There is no party tending to the needs of the camp residents, with the exception of sanitation, which was handled by the Silwad Municipality in coordination with the Palestinian National Authority. However, the municipality suddenly stopped serving the camp, demanding that the residents pay fees for the service. The streets of the camp were denied lighting because the residents failed to pay their electricity bills.

Ibrahim Siraj, president of the Camp Committee, was the first refugee to set foot in the camp. He came from the Nuseirat camp, to which he had moved in 1948 after being displaced from the village of Al-Maghar. He said about the transfer, "Israeli authorities had stripped us of our IDs and replaced them with West Bank IDs. Some of us were transported in trucks and others were simply given the address. Not all the refugees settled in the camp; some went to Jordan or Jericho or Ramallah, where they lived near other refugee camps in order to remain close to their families.

The refugees worked in construction. There was one elementary school for girls, while the boys attended government schools. As for medical care, the Silwad refugees sought it at Al-Amari refugee camp in the beginning, despite the distance. The United Nations Relief and Works Agency refused to recognize the camp officially, using frail excuses, although the residents paid rent."

== Rental contracts ==
Israeli authorities used water and power supplies as a means to pressure the residents, asking the residents to join the village unions in the 1980s and cutting off water and power supplies when they refused to cooperate with the military ruler. The public committee was then founded to solve the problems facing the residents. The committee founded and operating covertly was connected with the Palestine Liberation Organization.

== Transfer complex ==
The Silwad Municipality sent letters to the residents through the Palestinian Ministry of Housing asking them to pay rent that had accumulated over several years, in addition to delay fines and evacuation fines. The letter sent by the municipality warned the residents that their contracts had expired and had not been renewed and that they were staying in the homes illegally. The letters, dated 21 July 2001 and signed by the housing office in charge of abandoned property, informed the residents that they had 60 days to evacuate their homes. The residents of the camp contacted President Arafat, who ordered the governor and the Ministry of Housing to define the borders of the camp and leave things as was until the issue of refugees was resolved. The residents were no longer forced to pay rent.
