= Khaled Mashal =

Palestinian politician (born 1956)

Khaled Mashal خالد مشعل
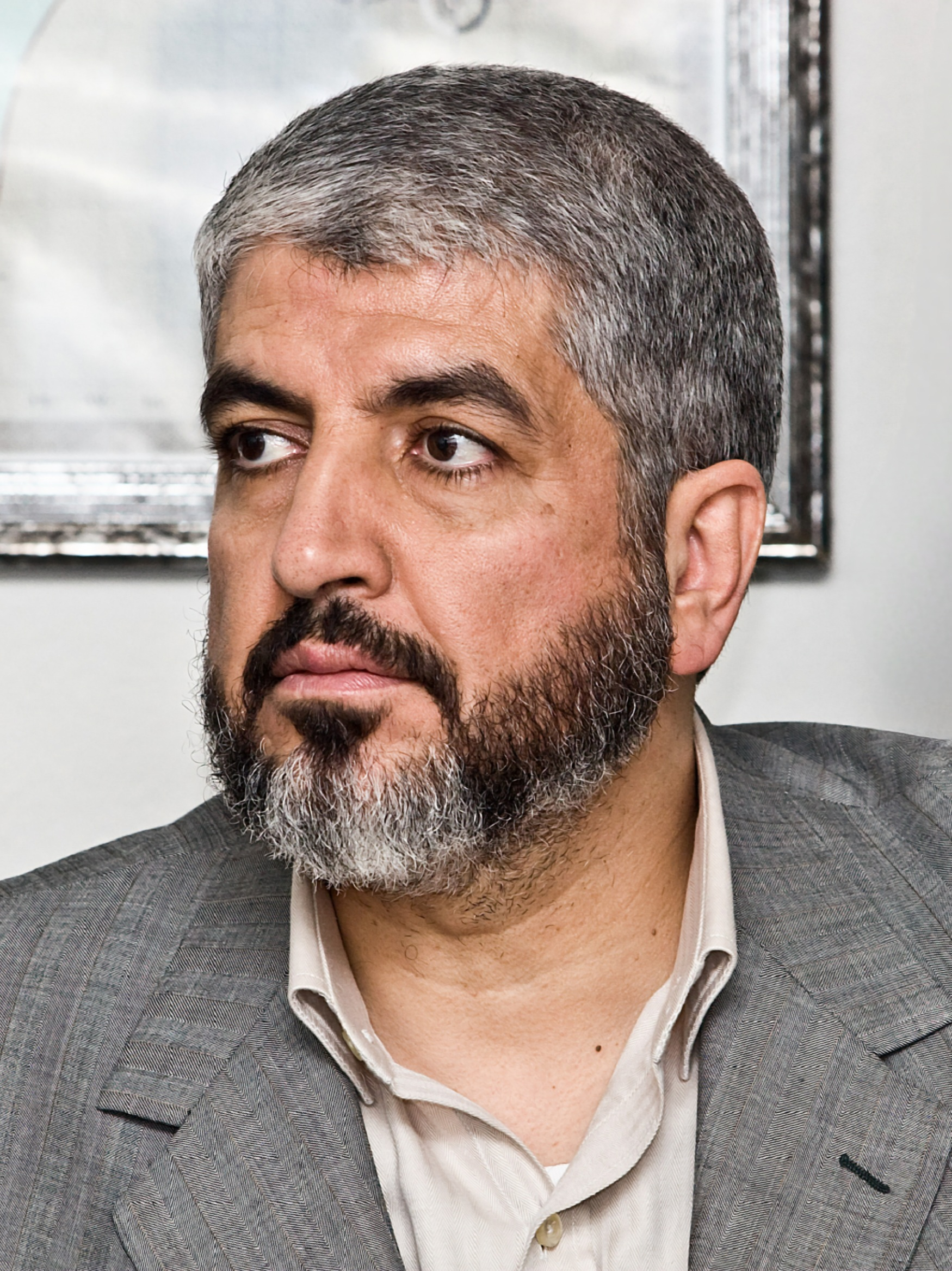
- Mashal in 2009

2nd Chairman of the Hamas Political Bureau
- Acting; 16 October 2024 – 20 July 2026 Serving with Khalil al-Hayya, Zaher Jabarin, Muhammad Ismail Darwish, and Nizar Awadallah
- Preceded by: Yahya Sinwar
- Succeeded by: Khalil al-Hayya
- Acting; 31 July 2024 – 6 August 2024
- Preceded by: Ismail Haniyeh
- Succeeded by: Yahya Sinwar
- In office 1996 – 6 May 2017
- Deputy: Mousa Abu Marzook (1997–2013); Ismail Haniyeh (2013–2017)
- Preceded by: Mousa Abu Marzook
- Succeeded by: Ismail Haniyeh

Personal details
- Born: 28 May 1956 (age 70) Silwad, Jordanian West Bank
- Party: Hamas
- Spouse: Amal Saleh Al-Boureni (m. 1980)
- Children: 7
- Education: Kuwait University (BSc)

Khaled Mashal (Arabic: خالد مشعل, romanized: Khālid Mashʿal, Levantine Arabic: [ˈχæːled ˈmeʃʕæl]; born 28 May 1956) is a Palestinian politician who served as the second chairman of the Hamas Political Bureau from 1996 until May 2017, when he was succeeded by Ismail Haniyeh. He has been the acting leader of Hamas twice, from July 2024 until August 2024 and immediately following October 2024, after both leaders were assassinated by Israel. He is regarded as one of the most prominent leaders of Hamas since the death of Ahmed Yassin, alongside Ismail Haniyeh and Yahya Sinwar.

Mashal was born in Silwad in 1956. Israel's occupation of the West Bank and the Gaza Strip during the 1967 Six-Day War forced Mashal's family to flee Palestine. He has since lived in exile in other parts of the Arab world. For that reason, he was considered part of Hamas' "external leadership".

After the founding of Hamas in the wake of the First Intifada against the Israeli occupation in 1987, Mashal became the leader of the Kuwaiti branch of the organization. In 1992, he became a founding member of Hamas' politburo and its chairman. He became the recognized head of Hamas after Israel assassinated both Sheikh Ahmed Yassin and his successor Abdel Aziz al-Rantisi in the spring of 2004. Under his leadership, Hamas secured a surprise majority of the seats in the Palestinian legislative election in 2006. Mashal stepped down as Hamas' politburo chairman at the end of his term limit in 2017.

== Early life and education ==
Mashal was born in 1956 in Silwad in the Jordanian-ruled West Bank. He attended Silwad Elementary School until fifth grade. His father, Abd al-Qadir Mashal, was a farmer (fellah) and had moved to Kuwait in 1957 to work in agriculture and as an imam. He had participated in the 1936–1939 Arab revolt with the Palestinian guerilla leader Abd al-Qadir al-Husayni. Mashal's half-brother is the former Al-Sakhra Band singer and former Dallas Public Works and Transportation Department engineer Mufid Abdulqader. Abduqalder is serving a 20-year prison sentence in the United States for funding Hamas through the Holy Land Foundation for Relief and Development.

Following the 1967 Six-Day War, during which Israel occupied the West Bank, his family fled to Jordan and, after a month or two, they joined Abd al-Qadir in Kuwait, where Mashal completed high school. He entered the prestigious Abdullah al-Salim Secondary School in the early 1970s and joined the Muslim Brotherhood in 1971.

Mashal enrolled in Kuwait University in 1974, and soon became involved in student politics. He headed the Islamic Justice list (qa'imat al-haq al-islamiyya) in the General Union of Palestinian Students (GUPS) elections in 1977. The list was based on the Palestinian Islamic movement, a part of the Muslim Brotherhood. The GUPS elections were cancelled and he founded the Islamic League for Palestinian Students (al-rabita al-islamiyya li tolaab filastin). He graduated with a bachelor of science degree in physics in 1978.

As a 19-year-old, Mashal visited historical Palestine in 1975 for two months for the first time since the occupation began in 1967. He was able to travel extensively in both Israel and the occupied territories. The trip deepened his feelings for his homeland and his sense of the losses in 1948 and 1967.

== Political career ==
=== Early political career ===
After graduating, Mashal became a teacher and taught physics in Kuwait until 1984. In 1983, the Palestinian Islamic movement convened an internal, closed conference in an undisclosed Arab state, which included delegates from the West Bank, Gaza Strip and Palestinian refugees from Arab states. The conference laid the foundation stone for the creation of Hamas. Mashal was part of the project's leadership. After 1984, he devoted himself to the project on a full-time basis. When Iraq invaded Kuwait in August 1990, he and the rest of Hamas' leadership in Kuwait relocated to Jordan.

Mashal was a founding member of Hamas' politburo, and was elected chairman in 1996, following the imprisonment of his predecessor Mousa Abu Marzook in 1995.

=== 1997 assassination attempt ===
On 25 September 1997, Israeli Mossad agents acting under orders from Prime Minister Benjamin Netanyahu and his security cabinet attempted to assassinate him. The agents entered Jordan on fake Canadian passports and disguised as tourists. Two of them waited at the entrance of the Hamas offices in Jordan's capital Amman, and, as Mashal walked into his office, one of them came up from behind and held a device to Mashal's left ear that transmitted a fast-acting poison. Mashal's bodyguards were suspicious prior to the attack and were able to chase the agents down and capture them. Other agents were also found and captured. In an interview, he described the attack as "a loud noise in my ear ... like a boom, like an electric shock." Initially, he thought the agents had failed to hurt him but later in the day he developed a severe headache and began vomiting. He was rushed to a Jordanian hospital where his condition rapidly deteriorated.

Immediately after the incident, Jordan's King Hussein demanded that Netanyahu turn over the antidote for the poison, threatening to sever diplomatic relations and to try the detained Mossad agents. King Hussein feared that the death of a Hamas leader would trigger riots in his kingdom, perhaps even a civil war. Netanyahu refused, and the incident quickly grew in political significance. With Israeli-Jordanian relations rapidly deteriorating, King Hussein threatened to void the historic 1994 peace between the two countries should Mashal die. U.S. President Bill Clinton intervened and compelled Netanyahu to turn over the antidote.

The head of Mossad, Danny Yatom, flew to Jordan, with Netanyahu's consent, bringing an antidote to treat Mashal. The doctors at King Hussein Medical Center, where Mashal lay in a coma, observed Mashal's symptoms to be consistent with an opioid overdose. They administered the antidote, which saved Mashal's life.

According to Ronen Bergman based on internal IDF sources, Mashal's antidote only secured the release of the two Mossad Kidon agents that were carrying out the assassination attempt. At least six other Mossad agents involved in the operations were holed up in the Israeli embassy. King Hussein would only release them if Israel released Ahmed Yassin and a large number of other Palestinian prisoners. King Hussein needed the demands to be "enough to enable the king to be able to publicly defend the release of the hit team."

In a 2008 interview, Mashal said of the attempt on his life: "[It] made me more positive about life. I became more courageous in the face of death. My faith became stronger that a man does not die until his time comes. That is, I will die when God decides, not when Mossad decides. It also made me more resolute in fulfilling my responsibilities."

=== Expulsion from Jordan ===
In August 1999, Hamas' "external leadership" was expelled from Jordan by King Abdullah II. The King feared that the activities of Hamas and its Jordanian allies would jeopardize peace negotiations between the Palestinian Authority and Israel (Saeb Erekat and Gilead Sher, leading to Sharm El Sheikh Memorandum), and accused Hamas of engaging in illegitimate activities within Jordan. In mid-September 1999, authorities arrested several Hamas leaders, including Mashal and Ibrahim Ghosheh on their return from a visit to Iran, and charged them with being members of an illegal organization, storing weapons, conducting military exercises, and using Jordan as a training base, charges they denied. Mashal was expelled from Jordan in November, and initially made Qatar his home. In 2001, he moved to Damascus, Syria.

=== Election victory ===
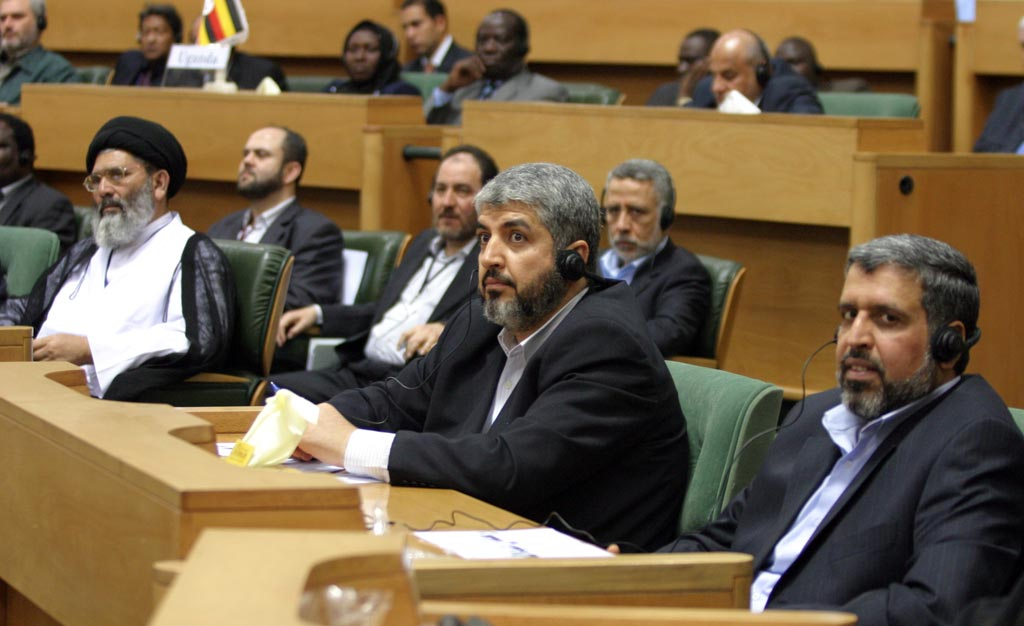
Khaled Mashal and PIJ's founder Ramadan Shalah (right) in Tehran, Iran, 14 April 2006

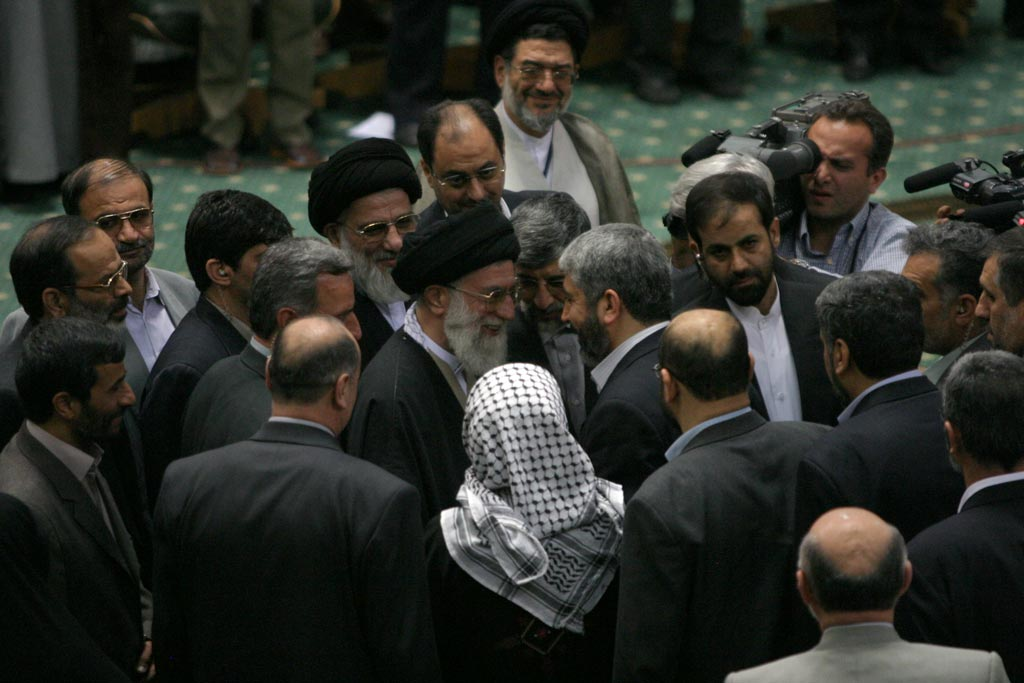
Mashal with Iran's Ayatollah Ali Khamenei and Iranian President Mahmoud Ahmadinejad in Tehran

Hamas won a majority of the seats in the Palestinian legislative election in 2006.

Defying pressure from the Quartet, Mashal announced on 29 January 2006 that Hamas had no plans to disarm but added that Hamas was willing to join arms with other Palestinian factions and form an army "like any independent state". Israel's Defense Minister Shaul Mofaz threatened to have Mashal assassinated.

=== Prisoner swap ===
Mashal was involved in negotiating a prisoner exchange deal which released captured Israeli soldier Gilad Shalit in exchange for over 1,000 Palestinian prisoners in Israel. Shalit was seized inside Israel near the southern Gaza Strip border by a coalition of Palestinian paramilitary groups, including Hamas, who had crossed the border through a tunnel near the Kerem Shalom border crossing. On 10 July 2006, Mashal stated Shalit was a prisoner of war and demanded a prisoner swap for his release which Israel refused.

On 18 June 2008, Israel announced a bilateral ceasefire with Hamas which began formally on 19 June 2008. The agreement was reached after talks between the two camps were conducted with Egyptian mediators in Cairo. As part of the ceasefire, Israel agreed to resume limited commercial shipping across its border with Gaza, barring any breakdown of the tentative peace deal, and according to one Israeli security source, negotiations on the release of Shalit were expected to resume. However, on 29 July 2008, Palestinian Authority President Mahmoud Abbas voiced his strong opposition to the release of 40 Hamas members of the Palestinian parliament in exchange for Shalit. On 2 October 2009, after the swap of 20 Palestinian prisoners for a proof-of-life video, Mashal vowed to capture more soldiers in order to secure the release of more Palestinian prisoners.

In October 2011, Shalit was released and handed over to Israel in exchange for 1,027 Palestinian prisoners.

=== Exile from Syria ===
In February 2012, as the Syrian civil war progressed, Mashal left Syria and returned to Qatar. Hamas distanced itself from the Syrian government and closed its offices in Damascus. Soon after, Mashal announced his support for the Syrian opposition, prompting Syrian state TV to issue a "withering attack" on him.

=== Tour of the Gaza Strip ===
In December 2012, following the eight-day conflict between Israel and Hamas and the negotiated truce, Mashal visited Gaza for the first time, beginning a four-day-long visit to the territory, for the 25th anniversary of Hamas's founding.

Upon arriving at the Rafah border crossing between Egypt and Gaza, Mashal prostrated himself on the ground in prayer, and was moved to tears by his reception. Mashal called his visit his "third birth" and wished for a fourth birth: "The first was my natural birth. The second was when I recovered from the poisoning. I ask God that my fourth birth will be the day we liberate all of Palestine." He told the cheering crowds, "We politicians are in debt to the people of Gaza." Traveling through Gaza City on the first day of his tour, Mashal visited the home of Yassin, as well as the home of Ahmed Jabari, the deputy chief of Hamas's military wing, who was assassinated at the start of the Israeli offensive in the previous month.

Addressing tens of thousands of attendees of Hamas's 25th anniversary in Gaza City's Katiba Square, Mashal reiterated his movement's refusal to concede any part of historical Palestine, stating "Palestine from the river to the sea, from the north to the south, is our land and we will never give up one inch." However, he also lent support to Palestinian President Mahmoud Abbas' successful initiative for international recognition of the State of Palestine at the United Nations, adding his belief that diplomacy helped the Palestinian cause, but was needed in conjunction with "resistance." At the conclusion of his visit Mashal stressed that Palestinian reconciliation was critical, stating that "Gaza and the West Bank are two dear parts of the greater Palestinian homeland."

After his appearance at a congress of the Turkish Justice and Development Party (AKP), the U.S. was concerned about the relations between the party and the Hamas.

=== Retirement ===
Mashal resigned as chairman of the politburo in 2017 and was succeeded by Ismail Haniyeh, a Gaza strip resident and leader of the Hamas-dominated Gaza strip government. The handover marked a transfer of power from Hamas leaders living abroad to those living in Gaza. Just prior to the handover, Mashal presented the 2017 Hamas charter in Doha, in an effort to seal his legacy and commit those coming after him to the same policies.

On 3 September 2024, the U.S. Department of Justice announced criminal charges against Mashal for allegedly orchestrating the 7 October attack on Israel, along with other senior Hamas officials. The charges, which were filed under seal in February 2024, include conspiracy to provide material support to a foreign terrorist organization and conspiracy to murder U.S. nationals.

=== 2025 assassination attempt (Qatar airstrike) ===
On 9 September 2025, it was reported that Mashal was present in the Hamas headquarters building in Doha, Qatar when it was struck by Israeli air strikes. Hamas stated that its entire leadership survived the attack.

== Second tenure ==
After the October 6 attacks, Mashal once again became acting leader of Hamas. In July 2026, Hamas announced that Khalil al-Hayya had been selected as chairman, with Mashal to remain on the governing council until the expiration of his electoral term in 2027.

== Views ==
Mashal believes that American Middle East policy is hypocritical and not about democracy. He has argued that the United States has no problem with a dictator that supports the United States, but a democratic leader that is against it is treated like an enemy.

=== Hamas ===
Mashal describes Hamas as follows:

Hamas can be characterized as a comprehensive movement. It is an Islamic movement, a nationalist movement, a militant movement, a political movement – in addition to its cultural and social dimensions, its service functions, and its institution building. So you cannot say that Hamas is only a religious, or only a political, or only a military, or only a religious and social movement. It is not, for example, just an armed wing or a political party. It is all of these things. It is a fusion of all these dimensions.

He does not believe that there is a contradiction between Hamas' and religious diversity:

The other aspect is that being an Islamic movement in Palestine or the Arab world does not mean you are opposed to the Palestinian or Arab Christian, or even to the liberal or secular Palestinian or Arab. To the contrary, we are taught to reinforce the culture of coexistence, dialogue, cooperation, of give-and-take, and to avoid fanaticism, whether in religion, thought, or affiliation.

He views the goal of Hamas to be to "end the Zionist occupation; to liberate the land and the holy places; to reclaim Palestinian rights; to secure the return of the refugees to their nation, lands, and homes; and to reclaim Jerusalem." Mashal wants the future Palestinian state to be one that "is open to the world, far from fanaticism, and one that promotes tolerance and accepts all."

=== Peace with Israel ===
Mashal believes that peace with Israel requires two things: that the Palestinian refugees that fled from, or were expelled by, Israeli forces in the 1948 Israeli War of Independence in which the Jewish State was established are allowed to return and that Israel withdraws from the territories it occupied in the 1967 war. Israel has said it would never agree to let all of the refugees return.

In an op-ed shortly after Hamas' 2006 election victory, Mashal suggested a long-term truce:

Our message to the Israelis is this: We do not fight you because you belong to a certain faith or culture. ... Our conflict with you is not religious but political. We have no problem with Jews who have not attacked us -- our problem is with those who came to our land, imposed themselves on us by force, destroyed our society and banished our people.

We shall never recognize the right of any power to rob us of our land and deny us our national rights. We shall never recognize the legitimacy of a Zionist state created on our soil in order to atone for somebody else's sins or solve somebody else's problem.

But if you are willing to accept the principle of a long-term truce, we are prepared to negotiate the terms. Hamas is extending a hand of peace to those who are truly interested in a peace based on justice.

In a 2006 meeting with Russia's foreign minister Sergey Lavrov, Mashal insisted that Israel must withdraw from the territory it occupied in the 1967 war and recognize a Palestinian right of return if it wants peace. He declared that Hamas is "for peace in the region ... after the end of the occupation."

In a meeting with former U.S. president Jimmy Carter in 2008, Mashal clarified that any agreement with Israel would have to be ratified with the Palestinian people in a referendum. Mashal later suggested a 10-year-truce (hudna) if Israel withdrew to the 1967 border. He considered this a proof of recognition: "We have offered a truce if Israel withdraws to the 1967 borders, a truce of 10 years as a proof of recognition".

In 2007, Mashal made comments which some saw as a "softened stance" towards Israel: "As a Palestinian today I speak of a Palestinian and Arab demand for a state on 1967 borders. It is true that in reality there will be an entity or state called Israel on the rest of Palestinian land. This is a reality, but I won't deal with it in terms of recognising or admitting it." In January 2024, however, he rejected two-state solution and peace with Israel calling for the eradication of Israel as the only solution and claimed that the chanting of "From the River to the Sea" slogan by "American students and in European capitals" had revived that dream.

=== Yasser Arafat ===
Mashal was a vocal critic of the Palestinian Authority President Yasser Arafat, often refusing to follow directives issued by the PA regarding ceasefires with Israel. Mashal was considered a key force behind this policy, along with Sheikh Ahmed Yassin. However, Mashal did attend Arafat's funeral, in Cairo on 12 November 2004.

=== Gaza blockade ===
Mashal believed that by blockading Gaza, Israel hoped to increase the suffering of the population so that they would turn against Hamas. He rejected the Israeli claim that the blockade was necessary for security reasons. He contended that the blockade was in violation of international law.

=== Militancy, jihad and martyrdom ===
Mashal described Hamas's adoption of suicide bombings as a "normal development", telling the BBC that the Second Intifada "has taught us that we should move forward normally from popular confrontation to the rifle to suicide operations."

Mashal acknowledged the influence of Hezbollah on Hamas's suicide bombings in a July 2000 interview, stating: "We always have the Lebanese experiment before our eyes... It was a great model of which we are proud." He reiterated this influence by asserting: "The Zionist enemy ... only understands the language of Jihad, resistance and martyrdom; that was the language that led to its blatant defeat in South Lebanon and it will be the language that will defeat it on the land of Palestine."

Following the October 7 attacks, Mashal praised the operation as a clever act of legitimate resistance against Israeli control. He acknowledged that Hamas predicted the major consequences of the attack, stating that loss of Palestinian lives is a necessary sacrifice in their struggle for freedom. A few days later, Mashal urged the Arab and Muslim world to join the war against Israel. He also said: "To all scholars who teach jihad... to all who teach and learn, this is a moment for the application (of theories)". In August 2024, he called for the resumption of suicide bombings against Israel.

=== Trump's peace plan ===
On 6 December 2025, he addressed Donald Trump's Gaza peace plan during a video conference named "Pledge to Jerusalem". He stated that Hamas had the right to retain their weapons and that “Our people need neither protection nor guardianship, and they aspire to independence, not mandate." In response, Israel's Ministry of Foreign Affairs stated his comments were a "direct contradiction of the core terms of the peace plan itself." and that Hamas had no intention of giving up their control of the Gaza strip, nor accepting the oversight of the International Stabilization Force (ISF).

On 15 December 2025, Mashal accused Israel of violating the October 2025 Gaza ceasefire by continuing to kill Palestinian civilians and fighters covered by the agreement and by restricting essential supplies. He said the first phase of the ceasefire had not been fully implemented and argued that Israel must meet its obligations before moving to a second phase, while asserting that Hamas and other factions had complied and remained engaged with mediators. Mashal reiterated that Hamas would not accept permanent disarmament outside a future Palestinian security framework but was willing to store its weapons and enter a long-term ceasefire. He rejected foreign governance or security arrangements for Gaza, calling them a form of occupation, and said Hamas was prepared to work with the United States and the international community on Gaza's reconstruction, elections, and negotiations toward a Palestinian state.

== Award and honour ==
In 2010, the British New Statesman magazine listed Khaled Mashal at number 18 in the list of "The World's 50 Most Influential Figures 2010".

== Personal life ==
Mashal married Amal Saleh Al-Boureni in 1980 or 1981 (Note: According to Alex Altman, Mashal married in 1981 but according to Charbel he married in 1980.) and is the father of three daughters and four sons. Currently, he lives in Qatar, where he moved in 2012.

== Publications ==
- "Hamas: Milestones in Thought and Experience" (book chapter) in Dr. Mohsen M. Saleh (editor), The Islamic Resistance Movement (Hamas): Studies of Thoughts & Experience, Al-Zaytouna Centre, 2017, pp. 443–467.

== See also ==
- List of leaders of Hamas
