= Fatma Ismail Salman =

Palestinian revolutionary (1937–2020)

Fatima Ismail Salman
- فاطمة ريما
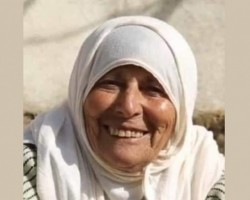
- Born: February 14, 1937; Silwad, British Mandatory Palestine
- Died: June 2, 2020 (aged 83); Ramallah, West Bank, Palestine
- Military career
- Allegiance: Fatah
- Conflicts: Six-Day War; War of Attrition

Fatma Ismail Salman (Arabic: فاطمة ريما February 14, 1937 – 2 June 2020) was a Palestinian activist and revolutionary.

== Early life ==
Fatma was born in the Palestinian town of Silwad in the West Bank on February 14, 1937. She moved to Jerusalem when she was 4 years old due to her father's work. In 1945 she moved to Haifa due to her father's work. Her family returned to Silwad because of violence between Jews and Palestinian residents of Haifa.

== Six Day War ==
During the Six-Day War, Fatma volunteered at an organization to help wounded Palestinians. During the Naksa, she advocated for Palestinians not to hang white flags from their homes and not to flee to Jordan.

== Joining Fatah ==
In 1968, with the help of Abdul-Ilah, who was later killed, she joined a militant cell led by her uncle Hajj Zain al-Din al-Najjar. Her role in the cell involved hiding weapons and providing logistical support. She was arrested in August 1969 and sentenced to three years in prison. During her time in prison, her house was destroyed by the IDF, and she was banned from traveling abroad for 18 years. After her release, she resumed her militant activities until March 1971, when she was arrested again alongside other women from her town. She was interrogated for six months by the Israeli police to give up information but she did not.

== Death ==
She died at the age of 83 in Ramallah her death was mourned by Fatah.
