= Silwad =

Palestinian town near Ramallah, West Bank

- Municipality type B

Arabic transcription(s)
  - Arabic: سلواد
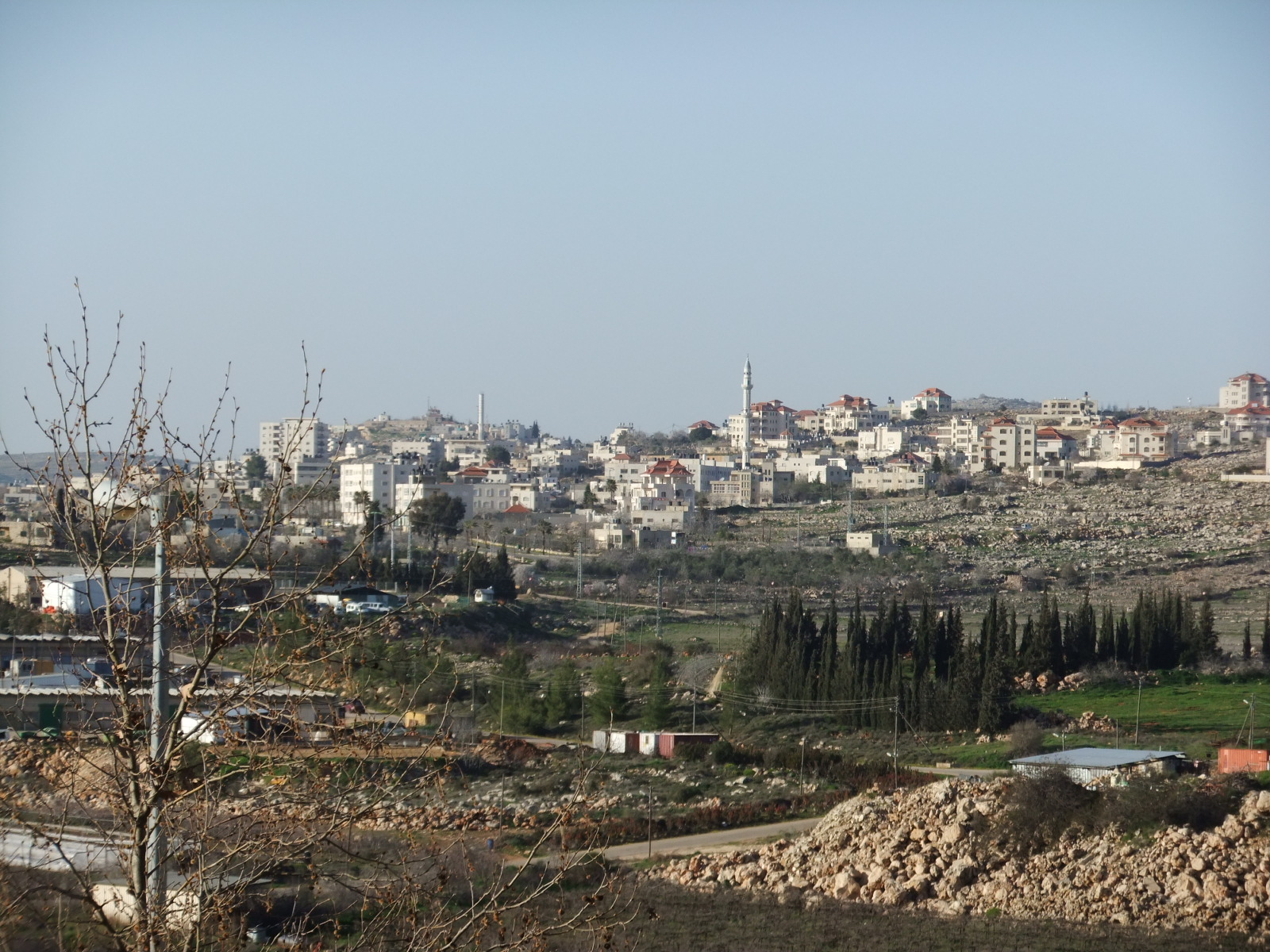
- A view of Silwad from a hillside

- Location of Silwad within Palestine
- Coordinates: 31°58′46″N 35°15′40″E
- Palestine grid: 174/154
- Country: State of Palestine
- Governorate: Ramallah and al-Bireh

Government
  - Type: Municipality

Area
  - Total: 18.8 km^{2} (7.3 sq mi)
- Elevation: 851 m (2,792 ft)

Population (2017)
  - Total: 6,342
  - Density: 337/km^{2} (874/sq mi)
- Name meaning: Selwad, personal name

Silwad (Arabic: سلواد) is a Palestinian town located north-east of Ramallah, about 5 km away from the Nablus-Jerusalem highway of the West Bank, in the State of Palestine. Silwad's altitude is about 851 meters above sea level. According to the Palestinian Central Bureau of Statistics (PCBS), the town had a population of 6,342 inhabitants in 2017.

Silwad is thought to have been built upon ruins dating back to the Mamluk and Early Ottoman eras. During the Ottoman period, it was primarily inhabited by people of Bedouin origin. It was previously recorded under the name of "Lisan el-Wadi".

== Etymology ==
Historians have argued the etymology of Silwad's name. Some debated that it is derived from the words lisan and wad, meaning "tongue of the valley," as the town is surrounded by mountains from all sides, while the town appears as a tongue amidst the mountains. Others claim that "Silwad" comes from the words sal and wad, meaning "a running valley."

== Climate ==
The climate is Mediterranean-mountainous. Silwad experiences cold and humid winters with several days of snow almost every year with an average annual precipitation of about 750 millimeters (29.5 inches). The summers are dry and mild. This climate is suitable for growing cherries, nectarines, kiwifruit, peaches, grapes and olives.

== Location ==
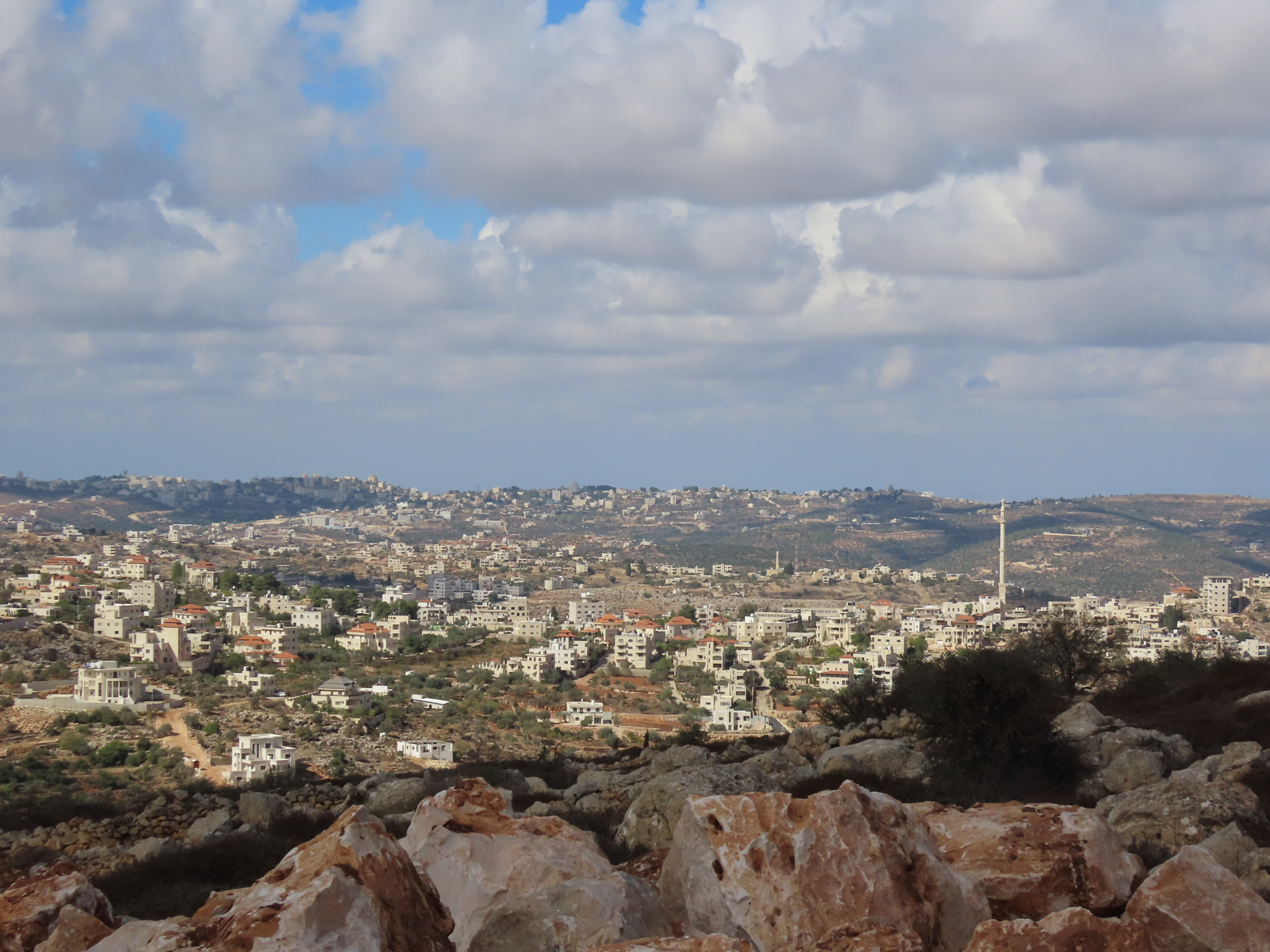
View of Silwad in the front with the tall minaret.

Silwad, which includes Silwad Camp, is located 10 kilometers (6.2 mi) (horizontally) northeast of Ramallah. It is bordered by Deir Jarir and Et Taiyiba to the east, Al Mazra'a ash Sharqiya and Jaljiliya to the north, Yabrud, Atara and Ein Siniya to the west and Ein Yabrud to the south.

== History ==
Silwad is built upon a ruin inhabited in the Mamluk and early Ottoman eras.

=== Ottoman era ===
In the spring of 1697, Henry Maundrell noted two "Arab villages," first "Geeb" and then "Selwid," both on the west side of the road on the way south from Nablus to Jerusalem. Edward Robinson identified these two villages as Jibiya and Silwad.

Grossman notes that during the Ottoman era, Silwad was populated by people of Bedouin origin who relocated to this area from elsewhere.

In 1838, Selwad was noted as a Muslim village in the District of Beni Murrah, north of Jerusalem.

An Ottoman village list of about 1870 counted 205 houses and a population of 817 in Silwad, though the population count included men, only.

In 1882, the PEF's Survey of Western Palestine described it as being situated on a hill, and having ancient tombs and a fine spring.

In 1896 the population of Silwad was estimated to be about 1,845 persons.

=== British Mandate era ===
In the 1922 census of Palestine conducted by the British Mandate authorities, Silwad had a population of 1,344, all Muslim, increasing in the 1931 census to 1631 Muslims and 4 Christians, in a total of 380 houses.

In the 1945 statistics the population was 1,910 Muslims, while the total land area was 14,186 dunams, according to an official land and population survey. Of this, 12,909 were plantations and irrigable land, 2,496 for cereals, while 72 dunams were classified as built-up areas.

=== Jordanian era ===
In the wake of the 1948 Arab–Israeli War, and after the 1949 Armistice Agreements, Silwad came under Jordanian rule.

Jordan confiscated lands of Silwad and nearby Ein Yabrud for the construction of a military camp before the Six-Day War.

The Jordanian census of 1961 found 3,215 inhabitants.

=== 1967-present ===
Since the Six-Day War in 1967, Silwad has been under Israeli occupation. Only 1.7% of village land belongs to Area A in the Oslo II Accord, while 37.7% is defined as Area B, and the remaining 60.6% is Area C.

The economy of Silwad is based on farming as well as handicrafts.

==== Land confiscation ====
The Jordanian buildings formed the initial basis of the Israeli settlement of Ofra founded in 1975. Plans for further expansion of Ofra in this land in 2011 resulted in legal challenges and public dispute. According to ARIJ, Israel has confiscated 988 dunams of land from Silwad for the construction of Ofra.

Silwad villagers have petitioned the High Court to be allowed to farm their traditional lands to which they had been denied access for a decade. They requested the right to access to some 3,100 dunams, a quarter of Silwad's lands of which has been blocked by settlers. Land that has been blocked from cultivation in this way includes property of villagers from Taybeh, Ein Yabrud and Deir Jarir. The IDF blocked Silwad villagers from accessing their farming lands when under escort from peace activists; these lands cannot be entered directly from the village itself but only via the Israeli settlement of Ofra. The incident occurred after they had obtained permission to enter it, under escort from volunteers of Yesh Din.

==== 3 March 2002 incident ====
A 22-year-old Silwad bricklayer, Thaer Hamad, used a World War II-era M1 Garand rifle and 30 rounds to fire from a nearby hill, at Wadi Haramiya, on an Israeli checkpoint, near the settlements of Ofra and Shilo, killing 7 soldiers and three civilian settlers. He let one settler woman and her two children pass unharmed. He told one person of his deed, word leaked out and he was eventually arrested in October 2004, put on trial and sentenced to 11 life sentences. Thaer had seen one of his uncle's (Nabil Hammad) killed when he was a child, during the First Intifada, and another shot dead by Israeli forces during the Al-Aqsa Intifada. Robi Danelin, the mother of one of the dead soldiers, who said her son had served reluctantly in the West Bank, wrote a letter of reconciliation to Hamad's family. Her letter was rebuffed by Thaer, who brusquely dismissed what he described as an equation between casualties among soldiers in an army of occupation and martyrs killed in the course of their struggle for freedom. The episode formed the basis for the plot of Najwa Najjar's 2014 film, Eyes of a Thief.

==== 24 October 2014 incident ====
Orwa Abd al-Wahhab Hammad (14/17), a US citizen who came from New Orleans to the West Bank when he was 6, and was a cousin of Thaer Hamad, was shot dead with a bullet to the neck which exited from his head during a demonstration in the village, reportedly by an Israeli sniper. He was the second such teenager killed by IDF live fire in the West Bank in 8 days, the 10th since the beginning of 2014, adding to the total of 34 Palestinian victims of IDF gunfire at civilians in the West Bank since mid-June. In various reports IDF sources state he was shot when he threw a bomb, or that an adult was shot when he lit a molotov cocktail fuse and was readying himself to throw it on Route 60. His cousin said he was among a group of rock-throwing Palestinians.

== Culture ==
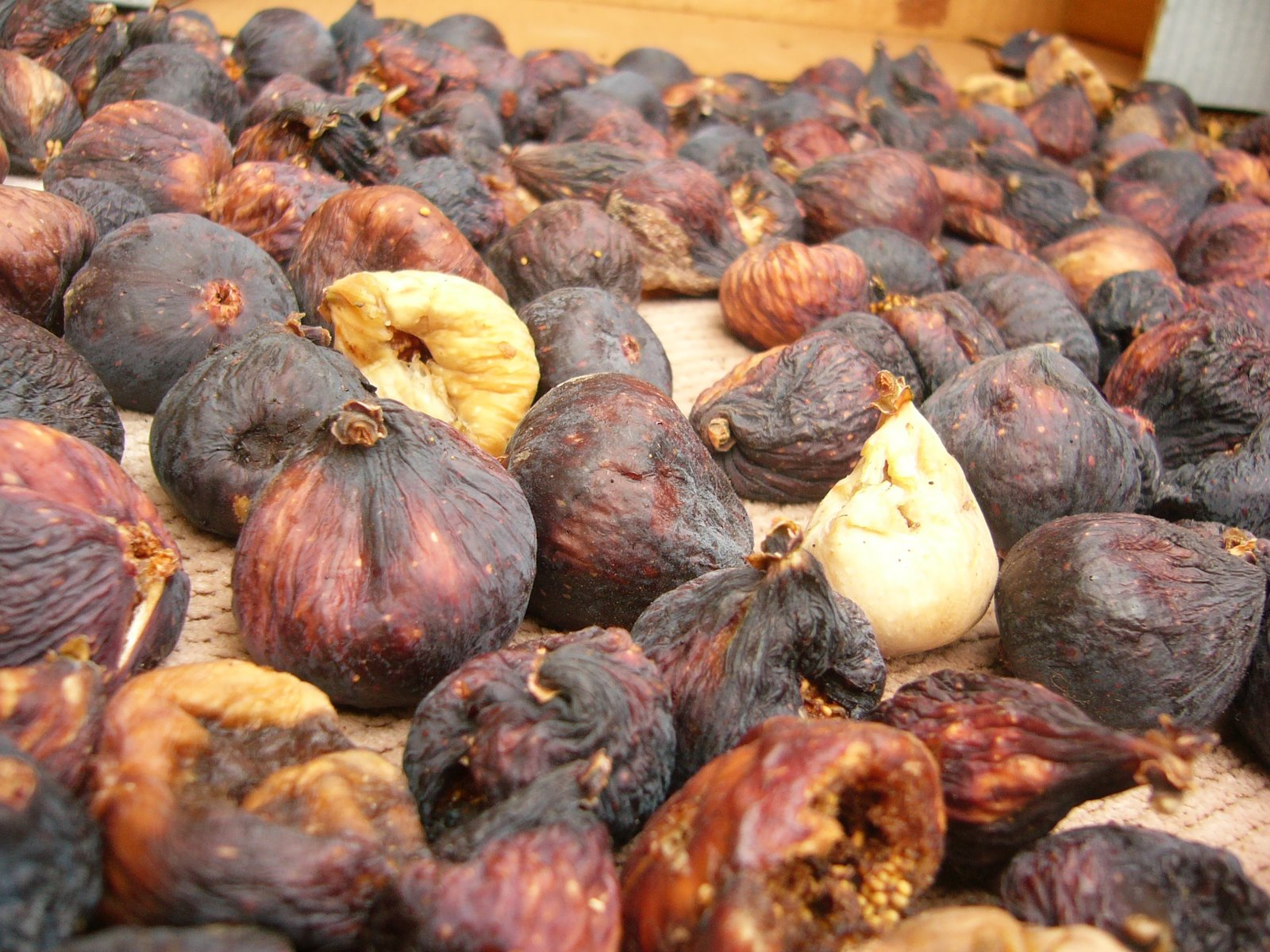
Quttayn, in the Ramallah area

Dried figs (Arabic: قطّين, romanized: quṭṭayn) are a traditional food product produced in Silwad. The figs are prepared seasonally by splitting fresh figs and sun-drying them, brushing them with oil, and stringing them into garlands for storage. Historically, dried figs formed part of household food reserves. Journalistic accounts describe the practice as declining, citing reduced fig cultivation, changing dietary patterns, and economic challenges.

== Demographics ==
According to the estimates of Silwad Association in Jordan the population of the people of Silwad in Diaspora exceeds 25,000 (1996 estimates). Among these, 8,000 reside in Silwad. There are about 8,000 Palestinians from Silwad in Kuwait, and there are also some in North and South America, especially Brazil.

=== Notable people from Silwad ===
- Mufid Abdulqader, an activist with the Holy Land Foundation
- Qadura Fares, Political leader of Fatah
- Khaled Mashal, leader of Hamas
- Fatma Ismail Salman, member of Fatah and activist

== Bibliography ==
- Barron, J.B., ed. (1923). Palestine: Report and General Abstracts of the Census of 1922. Government of Palestine.
- Conder, C.R.; Kitchener, H.H. (1882). The Survey of Western Palestine: Memoirs of the Topography, Orography, Hydrography, and Archaeology. Vol. 2. London: Committee of the Palestine Exploration Fund.
- Finkelstein, I.; Lederman, Zvi, eds. (1997). Highlands of many cultures. Vol. 1. Tel Aviv: Institute of Archaeology of Tel Aviv University Publications Section. ISBN 965-440-007-3.
- Government of Jordan, Department of Statistics (1964). First Census of Population and Housing. Volume I: Final Tables; General Characteristics of the Population (PDF).
- Government of Palestine, Department of Statistics (1945). Village Statistics, April, 1945.
- Hadawi, S. (1970). Village Statistics of 1945: A Classification of Land and Area ownership in Palestine. Palestine Liberation Organization Research Centre.
- Hartmann, M. (1883). "Die Ortschaftenliste des Liwa Jerusalem in dem türkischen Staatskalender für Syrien auf das Jahr 1288 der Flucht (1871)". Zeitschrift des Deutschen Palästina-Vereins. 6: 102–149.
- Maundrell, H. (1703). A Journey from Aleppo to Jerusalem: At Easter, A. D. 1697. Oxford: Printed at the Theatre.
- Mills, E., ed. (1932). Census of Palestine 1931. Population of Villages, Towns and Administrative Areas. Jerusalem: Government of Palestine.
- Palmer, E.H. (1881). The Survey of Western Palestine: Arabic and English Name Lists Collected During the Survey by Lieutenants Conder and Kitchener, R. E. Transliterated and Explained by E.H. Palmer. Committee of the Palestine Exploration Fund.
- Robinson, E.; Smith, E. (1841). Biblical Researches in Palestine, Mount Sinai and Arabia Petraea: A Journal of Travels in the year 1838. Vol. 3. Boston: Crocker & Brewster.
- Schick, C. (1896). "Zur Einwohnerzahl des Bezirks Jerusalem". Zeitschrift des Deutschen Palästina-Vereins. 19: 120–127.
- Socin, A. (1879). "Alphabetisches Verzeichniss von Ortschaften des Paschalik Jerusalem". Zeitschrift des Deutschen Palästina-Vereins. 2: 135–163.
