= Islamic Association of Palestine =

American nonprofit organization (1981–2004)

- Type: Not-for-Profit
- Industry: Charity work
- Founded: 1981
- Defunct: 2004
- Key people: Mousa Abu Marzook (Hamas-affiliate)
- Website: iap.org

Islamic Association of Palestine (IAP), and alternately as the American Muslim Society (AMS) and American Middle Eastern League for Palestine (AMEL), was an American not-for profit organization. Established in 1981, the IAP described itself as "a not-for-profit, public-awareness, educational, political, social, and civic, national grassroots organization dedicated to advancing a just, comprehensive, and eternal solution to the cause of Palestine and suffrages of the Palestinians." IAP founders included later Hamas politburo leader Mousa Abu Marzook.

The Islamic Association of Palestine had strong ties to the Holy Land Foundation for Relief and Development and to several organizations established in the U.S. that were alleged to serve as fronts for Hamas. In 2004, a US Federal Court found the IAP liable (alongside the Holy Land Foundation and Quranic Literacy Institute) for the 1996 murder of American citizen David Boim by Hamas operatives. As of 2004, the organization is defunct.

== Establishment and goals ==
The organization "was originally formed in 1981 by Dr. Aly Mishal at the personal direction of Khaled Meshal (who was then a senior Muslim Brotherhood activist and would later become secretary general of Hamas)." When the Muslim Brotherhood leader in Gaza formally established Hamas in 1987, "the IAP became the group's mouthpiece in North America."

In prosecuting Holy Land Foundation leadership, the U.S. Government presented evidence alleging the IAP was one of three organizations "created by the United States branch of the Muslim Brotherhood as part of [its] Palestine Committee with the stated mission of providing support to Hamas...[the] HLF, which raised money; the United Association for Studies and Research - UASR, which established policy; and the Islamic Association of Palestine - IAP, which disseminated information/propaganda."

Matthew Levitt, a fellow at pro-Israeli think tank Washington Institute, alleged that Hamas invested considerable resources to give "the Palestinian cause an Islamic flavor."

== Affiliation with Hamas and the Muslim Brotherhood ==
In a May 1991, a memo by an alleged Muslim Brotherhood member argued that IAP and numerous other organizations should unite around the goal of turning America into a Muslim country and promoting the Western civilization. According to The Bridge Initiative at Georgetown University, the memo's "language is wishful, and does not reflect the Muslim Brotherhood's agenda as outlined in documents obtained by the FBI."

IAP founders included Mousa Abu Marzook, funder and 1989 member of IAP Board of Directors. Abu Marzook served as the chairman of the advisory committee and allegedly donated startup funds to IAP, while providing seed money to the Holy Land Foundation "and operational funds for Mohammed Salah [a self-confessed Hamas member and military commander based in Chicago] to deliver to Hamas operatives in the West Bank." Allegedly, seven checks, for a total amount of $125,000, were deposited into IAP bank account between 1990 and 1991.

FBI transcript of the Palestine Committee meeting that took place on October 2–3, 1993, attended by members of the Islamic Association of Palestine.

Among IAP officers and founding members were several Hamas senior leaders who participated in a 1993 Philadelphia meeting attended by Hamas officers. Former Islamic Association of Palestine staffers and members were founding members of the Council on American-Islamic Relations (CAIR). This is the case of Nihad Awad, CAIR's executive director who was affiliated to the Islamic Association of Palestine, and who was also a "self-identified supporter of the Hamas movement." In a March 1994 speech at Barry University, future CAIR Executive Director Awad said in response to an audience question about the various humanitarian efforts in the Palestinian Occupied Territories, "I am in support of the Hamas movement more than the PLO... there are some [Hamas] radicals, we are not interested in those people." The statement was made before Hamas carried out its first suicide bombing and was designated a terrorist organization by the United States government.

Since the establishment of Hamas, IAP served as Hamas's public voice in the United States. The Islamic Association of Palestine published a magazine, Tareeq Filistine (Road to Palestine), Ila Filastin (To Palestine) and the newspapers Al-Zaytuna (The Olive) and Muslim World Monitor. In general, most of its publications consisted of flyers and communiqués encouraging jihad and endorsing Hamas's mission. Oliver Revell, former chief of the FBI's counter-terrorism department, called IAP "a front organization for Hamas that engages in propaganda for Islamic militants."

In a 2007 court filing, United States Federal Prosecutors asserted the IAP "was the first organization to publish an English version of the Hamas charter." The organization further distributed the Hamas publication Filisteen al-Muslima in the U.S., "which [paid] glowing tributes to Hamas suicide bombers, justifies their attacks, and suggests they be models for future suicide bombers."

The IAP held conventions and workshop to rally support for Hamas. Allegedly, the organization often declared its support for Hamas' role in the Palestinian Intifada against Israel. A December 1989 communiqué published by IAP read: "the only way to liberate Palestine, all of Palestine, is the path of Jihad," and "Hamas is the conscience of the Palestinian Mujahid people."

== Hamas fundraiser ==
IAP publicly called for donations to be directed to the Holy Land Foundation and assisted the foundation in its efforts to fundraise on behalf of Hamas. For instance, the December 1989 communiqué invited readers to "perform jihad for the sake of God with your money and donate as much as you can to support the Intifada in Palestine," and [directed] the funds to the Holy Land Foundation. Generally, solicitations for the Holy Land Foundation were included in almost all of IAP publications.

Furthermore, the Islamic Association of Palestine "negotiated fundraising contracts by which the [HLF] paid the IAP $40,000 for the IAP fundraising services."

IAP fundraising efforts on behalf of Hamas were confirmed by Hamas officers. In February 1996 a Hamas activist affiliated with IAP told an FBI source that IAP devolved $3 million per year to the Palestinian cause, funds that were sent to the Holy Land Foundation in Palestine and ultimately received by Hamas.

== Legal issues ==
In December 2004, a federal judge in Chicago ruled that the IAP (along with the Holy Land Foundation) was liable for a $156 million lawsuit for aiding and abetting the group Hamas in the death of 17-year-old David Boim, an American citizen. In December 2007, the United States Court of Appeals for the Seventh Circuit overturned the judge's ruling, holding that plaintiffs failed to prove that financial contributions to Hamas played a direct role in Boim's slaying. In 2008, the Seventh Circuit reheard the case en banc, and ruled in favor of the Boims.

In a 2017 lawsuit, the Boim family filed a lawsuit against American Muslims for Palestine, alleging the organization to be "a mere continuation of the Islamic Association under a new name" and seeking to collect unpaid damages from the 2004 judgment.
