= Holy Land Foundation for Relief and Development =

Islamic charity in the United States

- Type: Islamic charity
- Founded: 1988
- Defunct: 2001
- Headquarters: Richardson, Texas, U.S.
- Key people: Shukri Abu Baker; Ghassan Elashi
- Website: hlf.org

The Holy Land Foundation for Relief and Development (HLF; Arabic: مؤسسة الأرض المقدسة للإغاثة والتنمية, romanized: Muʾassasat al-ʾArḍ al-Muqaddasa li-l-ʾIghātha wa-t-Tanmiya), originally known as Occupied Land Fund (صندوق الأرض المحتلة, Ṣundūq al-ʾArḍ al-Muḥtalla), was an Islamic charity in the United States.

Headquartered in Richardson, Texas, and run by Palestinian-Americans, the organization's stated mission was to "find and implement practical solutions for human suffering through humanitarian programs that impact the lives of the disadvantaged, disinherited, and displaced peoples suffering from man-made and natural disasters."

In December 2001, the U.S. designated HLF a terrorist organization, seized its assets, and closed the organization. At the time it was the largest Muslim charitable organization in the United States. It had been under FBI surveillance since 1994. In 2004, a federal grand jury in Dallas, Texas, charged HLF and five former officers and employees with providing material support to Hamas and related offenses. The government's assertion was that HLF distributed charity through local zakat (charity) committees located in the West Bank that paid stipends to the families of Palestinian suicide bombers and Hamas prisoners; that Hamas controlled those zakat committees; that by distributing charity through Hamas-controlled committees, HLF helped Hamas build a grassroots support amongst the Palestinian people; and that these charity front organizations served a dual purpose of laundering the money for all of Hamas's activities.

Simultaneously, in November 2004, U.S. magistrate judge Arlander Keys ruled that HLF, along with the Islamic Association of Palestine (IAP), were liable for the 1996 killing of 17-year-old American citizen David Boim in Israel.

The first criminal trial, in 2007, ended in the partial acquittal of one defendant and a hung jury on all other charges. At a retrial in 2008, the jury found all defendants guilty on all counts. The 2008 trial of the charity leaders was the "largest terrorism financing prosecution in American history". In 2009, the founders of the organization were given sentences of between 15 and 65 years in prison for "funnelling $12 million to Hamas".

The trial has been criticised by some NGOs, including Human Rights Watch. Civil rights attorney Emily Ratner wrote that the use of anonymous and hearsay evidence by the prosecutors was "constitutionally questionable" at best. Families of the men charged, known as the Holy Land Five, have demanded their release.

== History ==
=== Early history (1988–1993) ===
In 1988, Shukri Abu Baker established a tax-exempt charity, called the Occupied Land Fund, based in Indiana. The following year the charity raised $300,000. Two years later the OLF was incorporated by Baker, Ghassan Elashi, and Mohammad el-Mezain in California and renamed the Holy Land Foundation for Relief and Development. In 1992, the HLF relocated to Richardson, Texas. It had offices in California, New Jersey, and Illinois, and individual representatives scattered throughout the US, the West Bank, and Gaza.

Mousa Abu Marzook, a political leader of Hamas and long time US resident, donated $210,000 to HLF in the early 1992. The donation was made before Hamas became a Designated Terrorist Organization. During this time, the US government alleged that Marzook led Baker, el-Mezain, and Elashi to create other Hamas-supporting organizations in the United States, including media entity Islamic Association of Palestine, and the United Association for Studies and Research (UASR). Abu Baker was reported having been on IAP's board. The 1992 donation was fully disclosed on the HLF's tax returns. Marzook was deported from the US to Jordan in 1997. He was indicted on August 20, 2004, by a US federal grand jury in Chicago, Illinois. He and two other individuals were charged with a 15-year conspiracy to raise funds for terrorist attacks against Israel. Neither HLF nor any HLF officer was charged in the Chicago indictment.

=== Federal scrutiny (1994–2001) ===
Before the designation of HLF as a terrorist organization, the government had been surveilling the organization pursuant to the Foreign Intelligence Surveillance Act ("FISA") as well as several individuals due to suspect activity. In 1993, one month after the signing of the Oslo Accords, Baker and Elashi participated in a public meeting in Philadelphia secretly recorded by the FBI. During this meeting, participants discussed their opposition to the Oslo Accords and their support of Hamas. Baker said the meeting was a "joint workshop" between HLF and the IAP." He also stated that participants should not refer to "samah" or Hamas spelled backwards explicitly, mentioning that it would be better for participants to obscure the meaning by saying "Sister Samah". Following this meeting, in 1994 the government searched the houses of two unindicted co-conspirators, Ismail Elbarasse and Abdelhaleen Masan Ashqar, where they found numerous documents labeling HLF as a fundraising arm for Hamas.

In 1994, the Anti-Defamation League and the American Jewish Congress launched a campaign demanding that the IRS revoke the HLF's tax-exempt status; the campaign was supported by Charles Schumer, Nita Lowey and Eliot Spitzer. Further government scrutiny and action was encouraged by the Israeli government.

In February 1995, the HLF and several other US Muslim organizations held a meeting with senior US Treasury Department officials asking for guidelines on how to avoid making inappropriate transactions with designated terrorist organizations. Those attending included the Chief of the International Programs Division, John Robert McBrien, the head of the Office of Foreign Assets Control, Richard Newcomb, the head of the Licensing Division, Stephen Pinter, and the senior attorney in the Treasury Department's Chief Council's office, Serena Moe. The guidelines requested were finally released in 2002.

During the mid-1990s, HLF distributed publications that stated HLF raised money for "widows, orphans, the homeless, and 'families of martyrs." In addition, the group lauded the fact that it was the "first to aid the 413 suspected Hamas activists whom Israel deported to Lebanon in 1992." HLF also listed Islamic University of Gaza—also founded by Marzook—as one recipient of its aid. In response to allegations that HLF provided funds to a religious school run by Jamil Hamami, who publicly identified as a senior Hamas leader, Baker argued that the school was well respected.

In 2000, HLF raised over $13 million, making it the largest Muslim charity in the United States at the time.

=== Terrorism designation (2001–2008) ===
On December 4, 2001, under Executive Order 13224 issued by President Bush, the Holy Land Foundation was designated a Domestic Terror Organization and closed down. Following HLF's designation as a terrorist organization, the assets of the organization were frozen by the FBI and Treasury agents.

According to the United States Department of Treasury, HLF was making donations to Hamas run charities, ("zakat committees") and to schools "that served Hamas's ends by encouraging children to become suicide bombers and to recruit suicide bombers by offering support to their families". While Treasury officials conceded that a "substantial amount" of the money raised went to worthy causes, they insisted that Holy Land's primary purpose had been to subsidize Hamas. Treasury officials had found that HLF provided the following amounts to "zakat" charities from 1992 to 2001: $366,584 to the Tulkarem Zakat Committee; $1,674,954 to the Islamic Charitable Society of Hebron ("ICS Hebron"); $475,715 to the Nablus Zakat Committee; $554,500 to the Jenin Zakat Committee; $494,252 to the Ramallah Zakat Committee; and $295,187 to the Qalqilia Zakat Committee. The Treasury argued that these charities were affiliated and controlled by Hamas despite functioning under the Israeli Military Administration. In addition, HLF sent $485,468 to the Islamic Science and Culture Committee from May 1991 until the committee was closed in 1996. Between 1992 and 2001 the HLF received $56 million in donations, and during 1995–2001 $12.4 million was spent outside the United States. Repeated appeals to the courts by HLF to have the freeze lifted failed.

In 2002, the HLF filed a civil lawsuit challenging the government's designation of the organization as a terrorist entity and the subsequent asset freeze. The district court dismissed the challenge, and the dismissal was later affirmed by the U.S. Court of Appeals for the D.C. Circuit.

On July 27, 2004, a federal grand jury in Dallas, Texas, returned a 42-count indictment against the Holy Land Foundation. Charges included: conspiracy, providing material support to a foreign terrorist organization, tax evasion, and money laundering. The indictment alleged that the Holy Land Foundation provided more than $12.4 million to individuals and organizations linked to Hamas from 1995 to 2001, when their assets were frozen. The indictment also named specific officers of the Holy Land Foundation: President Shukri Abu Baker; Chairman Ghassan Elashi; and Executive Director Haitham Maghawri, and four others: Mohammad el-Mezain, Akram Mishal, Mufid Abdulqader, and Abdulraham Odeh. Five of the seven were arrested. Maghawri and Mishal have not been found, and are considered fugitives.

In December 2004, a federal judge in Chicago ruled that the Holy Land Foundation (along with the Islamic Association of Palestine and the Quranic Literacy Institute) was liable in a $156 million lawsuit for aiding and abetting the militant group Hamas in the death of David Boim, a 17-year-old U.S. citizen murdered by members of Hamas while visiting Israel in 1996. This decision was the first time U.S. citizens or organizations were held liable under a 1990 federal law that permitted victims of terrorism to sue for civil damages. In 2007, this decision was reversed by the 7th Circuit Court of Appeals in Chicago and sent back to the trial court.

In December 2005, the European Union froze its European assets.

On July 3, 2007, Muslim Legal Fund of America agreed to fund the defense of the Holy Land Foundation for Relief and Development against allegations by the government that the charity provided "material support" for terror groups by providing basic necessities (i.e. food, clothing, shelter, etc.) for Palestinians under the Israeli occupation.

In October 2008, the United States Department of the Treasury's Office of Foreign Asset Control designated HLF a Specially Designated Global Terrorist.

In 2008, the 7th Circuit Court of Appeals reheard the Boim lawsuit en banc. On November 3, 2008, the 7th Circuit upheld the $156 million award, agreeing that "those who donate funds to a known terrorist group are responsible under U.S. law for the group's actions – even if the donors contend that they only intended to support the group's 'humanitarian' activities."

=== Related groups ===
Ghassan Elashi, HLF chairman, was also vice president of InfoCom Corporation of Richardson, Texas, indicted along with Hamas' Marzook. InfoCom, an Internet company, shared personnel, office space, and board members with the HLF. The two organizations were formed in California around the same time, and the Washington Institute has argued that both received seed money from Hamas leader Marzook. InfoCom also maintained the web sites for HLF and IAP (Islamic Association of Palestine).

== 2007 trial ==
The first HLF criminal trial began on July 23, 2007, at the Earl Cabell Federal Building in Dallas, Texas. On October 22, 2007, Judge Joe Fish declared a mistrial because the jurors were deadlocked.

=== Testimony and evidence ===
During the 2007 trial, the lawyers representing the foundation alleged that the Justice Department fabricated quotes and modified transcripts. The defendants attempted to motion for evidence collected under the Classified Information Procedures Act (CIPA) as unconstitutional, although Judge Fish denied this request on February 27, 2007. The defendants argued that they themselves needed access to each classified intercepts to find exculpatory information and that the summaries provided were inaccurate.

Judge Fish noted that the court was already aware that not every intercept was summarized by the government nor was every intercepted collected listened to by the government. Fish claimed that the defendants' access was already sufficient since they had personal access to all the declassified summaries of the FISA intercepts and to the four lines of FISA intercepts that were fully declassified. Their attorneys who possessed security clearances could also access all FISA intercepts the government produced. Judge Fish mentioned that if this was insufficient then the parties could use the summaries of intercepts and other criteria – such as the phone numbers involved in the communications – to identify specific relevant intercepts in order to ask the government to review and declassify the identified intercepts. Judge Fish criticized the defendants for seeking to declare the whole of CIPA as unconstitutional rather than utilize the pathway to declassification already laid out for them on December 8, 2006. In response to the mistranslated summaries, Judge Fish noted that unless the defendants found more than the one example provided amongst the declassified summaries that are significantly inaccurate or misleading, they could not provide that the presented inaccuracies were widespread rather than an isolated incident. Judge Fish again mentioned that the defendants could use the aforementioned pathway for declassification of FISA evidence and stated that the defendants could request relief if they found widespread issues related to misleading summaries, although "it is highly unlikely that such appropriate relief would include a declaration that CIPA is unconstitutional."

On July 5, 2007, Judge Fish again denied the defendants request to prevent the government from introducing or relying upon any communications from lines that the defendants could not access and prohibit the government from using forty-five transcripts of conversations that the defendants never received in summary form. Judge Fish denied the request stating that the "forty-five intercepts constitute less than twenty-three percent of the intercepts the government intends to use at trial" and that the government offered starting in August 2005 to seek declassification of any intercepts the defendants would request. Judge Fish criticized the defendants' lawyers as having "drag their feet" and "having refused to seek declassification of specific documents for at least eighteen months after the government offered its assistance, the defendants now wish to place blame on the government for their own failure to seek declassification of documents in preparation for trial." Of the government's 200 transcripts designated for use at trial, the defendants had access to full transcripts for 50 of the intercepts, and access to 105 declassified summaries of additional intercepts. They roughly had access to 155 of 200 or 77.5% of the intercepts the government planned to use at trial.

Critics pointed out erroneous evidence produced during the trial. For example, over defence objection, the government called two anonymous witnesses: an Israeli Security Agency (ISA) employee who was known to the jurors and the defense as "Avi" and an Israeli Defense Forces officer who was known to the jurors and the defense as "Major Lior". The defense lawyers were not permitted to know the names of these witnesses. The government cited legal restrictions and safety concerns to protect Avi's identity, of which the motion for protective measures was granted his testimony was based on "much of the material that has previously been provided to the defense... as well as some of the documentation seized from the Holy Land Foundation's offices." However, the government was ordered to provide the defendants with all "tangible underlying facts and data, not previously produced, upon which the ISA agent relies in reaching his opinion." Other expert testimony included Washington Institute for Near East Policy, Johns Hopkins University lecturer, and former intelligence research specialist at the FBI Matthew Levitt, Col. Jonathen Fighel, and acting unit chief for the FBI's cryptanalysis and racketeering records unit Daniel B. Olsen. Olsen's testimony focused on Hamas' financial infrastructure, including their financial records and affiliated zakat committees. Levitt's testimony focused on Hamas' origins, leaders and prominent members, and structure.

The government did not allege that HLF paid directly for suicide bombings, but instead that the foundation supported terrorism by sending more than $12 million to charitable groups, known as zakat or charity committees, which provide social goods and services. The prosecution said the committees were controlled by Hamas, and contributed to terrorism by helping Hamas spread its ideology, recruit supporters, and provide a front for laundering money and soliciting donations. Some of these charitable committees were still receiving US funding through the USAID program as late as 2006. Although none of the zakat committees were included on the Treasury Department list of designated terrorist organizations, the government alleged that HLF knew these charities were controlled by Hamas and acted as a branch of Hamas within the United States. Avi testified that the zakat committees were controlled by Hamas starting in 1991. Moreover, conversations captured from the Philadelphia meeting in 1993 had Hamas leader Muin Shabib discussing the zakat committees relationship to Hamas. Another 1991 letter addressed to Baker used similar language implying Hamas control of the zakat charities. This evidence established HLF's relationship with Hamas prior to 1995. Following Hamas' designation, financial documents and testimony showed that HLF provided funds to the same Hamas-controlled zakat committees as prior to the designation. Evidence seized in an Israeli raid from the zakat committees buttressed this claim, as video recordings showed school ceremonies and other events that promoted Hamas ideology, such as teaching children plays about suicide bombings, as well as the connections of multiple Hamas leaders to the zakat committees.

Other evidence included seizures from HLF's offices in Texas, New Jersey, Illinois, California, wire taps, financial documents, evidence seized by the Israeli military from the zakat committees and from the Palestinian Authorities' headquarters in Ramallah. Video recordings showed the defendants appearing at HLF fundraising events attended by Hamas leaders and explicitly soliciting donations following praising Hamas. One video that implicated HLF leaders was surprisingly found buried in the backyard of Falls Church resident Marcial Peredo whose home was formerly occupied by Fawaz Mushtaha who played in the same band as one of the defendants. Peredo was in the process of landscaping his yard when he discovered a buried box of old data tapes, as well as charred cell phones, money, maps, and tape containers in the built-in outdoor grill. Additional evidence included Marzook's personal connections to the defendants, including telephone calls to El-Mezain and Baker, and listing some of the defendants' contact information in his personal book. There were also numerous financial transactions between the defendants and Marzook and Marzook's wife Nadia who is also the cousin of Elashi.

=== Mistrial ===
After 19 days of deliberations, the 2007 jury was unable to come to a definitive conclusion and the case ended in a mistrial. While 200 charges were filed against the defendants, the jurors had acquitted on some counts and were deadlocked on charges ranging from tax violations to providing material support for terrorists. El-Mezain was acquitted of all but one of the 32 charges against him, with the jury deadlocking on a single count of conspiracy. One juror mentioned that the panel found little evidence against three defendants and was split on charges against Baker and Elashi. The New York Times reported: "The decision today is 'a stunning setback for the government, there's no other way of looking at it,' said Matthew D. Orwig, a partner at Sonnenschein Nath & Rosenthal who was, until recently, United States Attorney for the Eastern District of Texas. 'This is a message, a two-by-four in the middle of the forehead,' Orwig said. 'If this doesn't get their attention, they are just in complete denial,' he said of Justice Department officials, who he said may not have recognized how difficult such cases are to prosecute."

Experts found the jury's inability to come to a definitive conclusion to be evidence of weakness in the government's ability to provide clear enough evidence against the charity. The LA Times reported that Georgetown University law professor David Cole said: "If the government can shut them down and then not convince a jury the group is guilty of any wrongdoing, then there is something wrong with the process". "The whole case was based on assumptions that were based on suspicions", said juror Scroggins, who added: "If they had been a Christian or Jewish group, I don't think [prosecutors] would have brought charges against them."

== 2008 retrial and convictions ==
The HLF retrial began on August 18, 2008. The prosecution again presented the two anonymous Israeli witnesses, "Avi" and "Major Lior". In an effort to strengthen its unsuccessful presentation at the first trial, the prosecution added testimony from former National Security Council staff member Steven Simon, from Treasury Department official Robert McBrien, and from Mohamed Shorbagi, who had pleaded guilty to charges unrelated to HLF and was cooperating with the prosecution. The prosecution also placed into evidence documents that, according to "Major Lior", the IDF had recovered from the Palestinian Authority headquarters in Ramallah during an IDF operation in 2002 known as "Operation Defensive Shield".

On November 24, 2008, the government obtained guilty verdicts on all counts against HLF and the five individual defendants in the retrial. HLF was found guilty of giving more than $12 million to support Hamas. The charges on which the jury found the defendants guilty included conspiracy to provide material support to a foreign terrorist organization, providing material support to a foreign terrorist organization, and conspiracy to commit money laundering.

"Today's verdicts are important milestones in America's efforts against financiers of terrorism," Patrick Rowan, assistant attorney general for national security, said after the trial. "This prosecution demonstrates our resolve to ensure that humanitarian relief efforts are not used as a mechanism to disguise and enable support for terrorist groups."

The five convicted individuals were Ghassan Elashi, former CEO Shukri Abu-Baker, Mufid Abdulqader, Abdulrahman Odeh, and Mohammad El-Mezain.

- Abu-Baker was sentenced to 65 years.
- Elashi, also a member of the founding Board of Directors of the Texas branch of the Council on American-Islamic Relations (CAIR), was sentenced to 65 years.
- Mufid Abdulqader was sentenced to 20 years.
- Abdelrahman Odeh was sentenced to 15 years.
- El-Mezain, former endowments director, sentenced to 15 years.

Because of the potential lengthy sentences for the criminal convictions, the individual defendants were remanded into custody without bail pending any appeal.

== Judicial appeals ==
The defendants appealed their convictions and sentences to the United States Court of Appeals for the Fifth Circuit. On December 7, 2011, the court of appeals affirmed the convictions and sentences. The court found that the trial court had erred in admitting each of the additional items of evidence on which the prosecution relied in the second trial (the Simon testimony, the McBrien testimony, the Shorbagi testimony, and the documents recovered from the Palestinian Authority headquarters). But the court of appeals found that the errors in admitting this evidence were harmless (i.e., that the errors did not affect the outcome of the trial).

The defendants petitioned the court of appeals for rehearing. They contended that the four erroneously admitted items of evidence were the key differences between the first trial, where the jury did not return a single guilty verdict, and the second trial, where the jury returned guilty verdicts on every count. The court of appeals denied the petition for rehearing without comment.

In May 2012, Elashi, Baker, Abdulqader, and Odeh filed a petition for writ of certiorari with the United States Supreme Court, challenging their convictions on Sixth Amendment grounds and thereby requesting that the high court review their convictions. The defendants asserted that the prosecution's use of two anonymous witnesses during their trial was impermissible as a matter of law.

On October 29, 2012, the United States Supreme Court denied the petition for writ of certiorari.

== Criticism of the trial ==
British barrister Francis FitzGibbon QC has called the second trial a "show trial" which relied on "untested and untestable evidence", hearsay evidence, prejudicial evidence, and the showing to the jury of additional material which was not part of the evidence at all. These add up to "patent failings and abuses in the legal process". FitzGibbon also doubts the strength of the prosecution's case because, among other reasons, the United States Agency for International Development funded the same zakat committees named in the indictment of the HLF, and continued to do so for three years after it had shut down the HLF.

In 2018, Miko Peled published the book Injustice: The Story of the Holy Land Foundation Five, in which he catalogs the trial of the criminalization and dismantling of the Holy Land Foundation for Relief and Development, leading to the arrest and jailing of Foundation President Shukri Abu Baker, Chairman Ghassan Elashi, Mohammad el-Mezain, Mufid Abdulqader and Abdulraham Odeh. According to Peled, "the American justice [...] can convict a hundred innocents for one who is guilty". Peled also argued that none of the recipients of aid were family members of suicide bombers and questions why Hamas continued to flourish since the foundation shut down.

Civil rights attorney Emily Ratner wrote that the use of anonymous and hearsay evidence by the prosecutors was "constitutionally questionable" at best. Additionally, much of the evidence used to convict the Holy Land Foundation was "secret evidence" which the defense was unable to read or even know who made it. According to Marjorie Cohn, professor emerita of the Thomas Jefferson School of Law, the trial was a "grave miscarriage of justice" and "capitalized on post-9/11 Islamophobic hysteria" in order to convict the Holy Land Five. Pulitzer Prize journalist Chris Hedges describes it as "one of the most egregious cases of injustice committed to date against Muslim leaders in the United States."

Human Rights Watch has condemned the trial as it was based on hearsay evidence and called on the Biden administration to release all 5 accused.

== Imprisonment and release ==
A 2011 NPR report claimed some of the people associated with this group were imprisoned in a highly restrictive Communication Management Unit.

On December 12, 2024, Mufid Abdulqader was released from Seagoville, Texas Federal Correctional Institution after 16 years of imprisonment.

== Media and advocacy efforts ==
In 2017, rapper Zohran Mamdani, later elected Mayor of New York City, expressed support for the "Holy Land Five" in the song "Salaam".

On February 22, 2022, Nida Abu Baker, the daughter of Shukri Abu Baker released a two part documentary - titled The Holy Land 5 - directed by Mohammad Omar. It discusses the controversy regarding the trial and history of the Holy Land Foundation.

On November 24, 2022, Within Our Lifetime, the Coalition for Civil Freedoms and the Samidoun Prisoner Network launched a campaign to release the Holy Land Five.
