= Mousa Abu Marzook =

Hamas leader (born 1951)

- موسى محمد أبو مرزوق
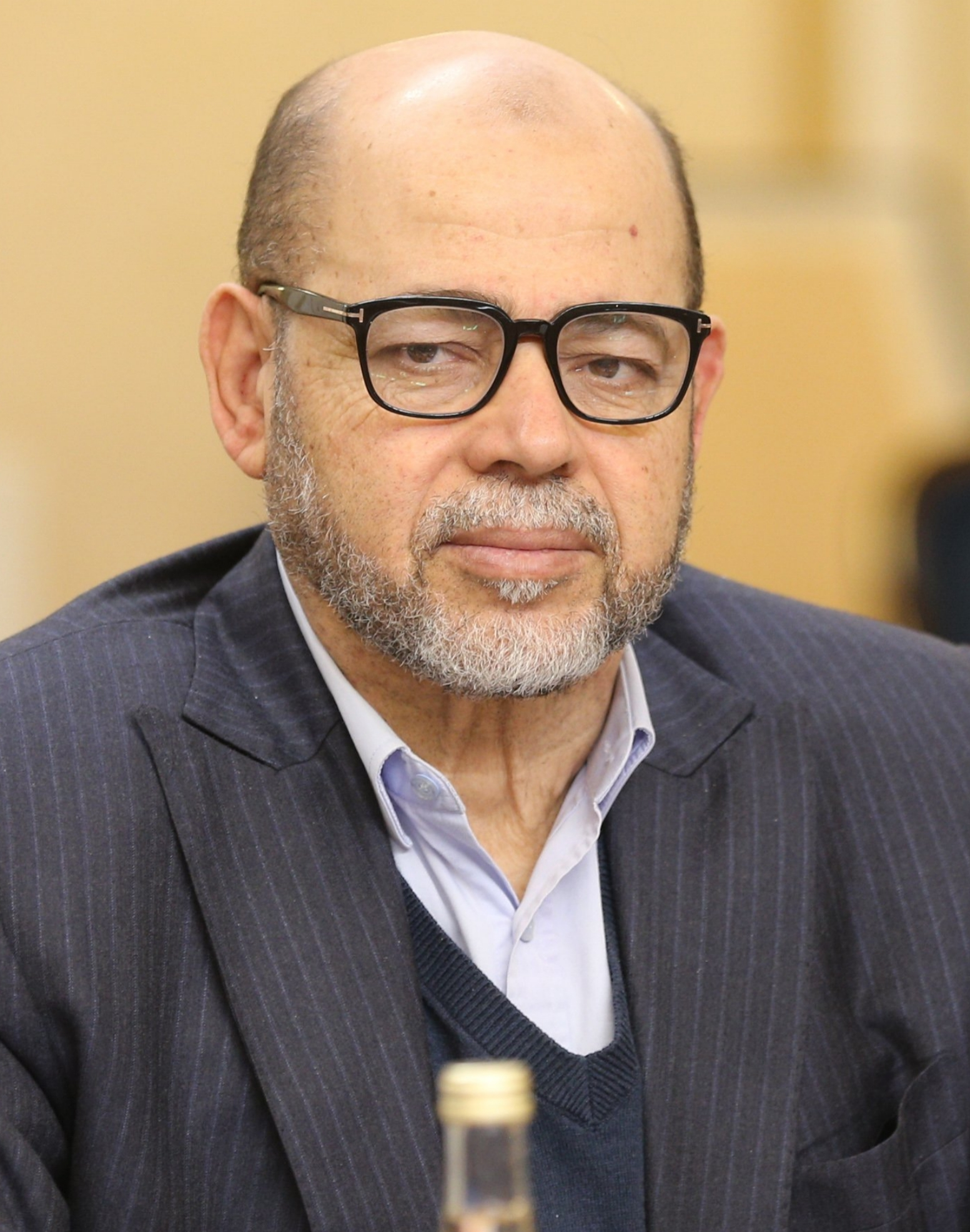
- Marzook in 2022

1st Chairman of Hamas Political Bureau
- In office 1992–1996
- Preceded by: Position established
- Succeeded by: Khaled Mashal

1st Deputy Chairman of Hamas Political Bureau
- In office 15 January 1997 – 4 April 2013
- Chairman: Khaled Mashal
- Preceded by: Position established
- Succeeded by: Ismail Haniyeh

Personal details
- Born: Mousa Mohammed Abu Marzook; 9 January 1951 (age 75) Rafah, All-Palestine Protectorate
- Party: Hamas; Islamic Association of Palestine
- Education: Ain Shams University (BSc); Colorado State University (MSc); Louisiana Tech University (PhD)
- Parents from: Yibna

Mousa Mohammed Abu Marzook (Arabic: موسى محمد أبو مرزوق; born 9 January 1951) is a Palestinian politician and senior member of Hamas who served as the first chairman of the Hamas Political Bureau from 1992 until 1996 and deputy chairman of the Hamas Political Bureau from January 1997 until April 2013, where he was succeeded by Ismail Haniyeh.

== Early life and education ==
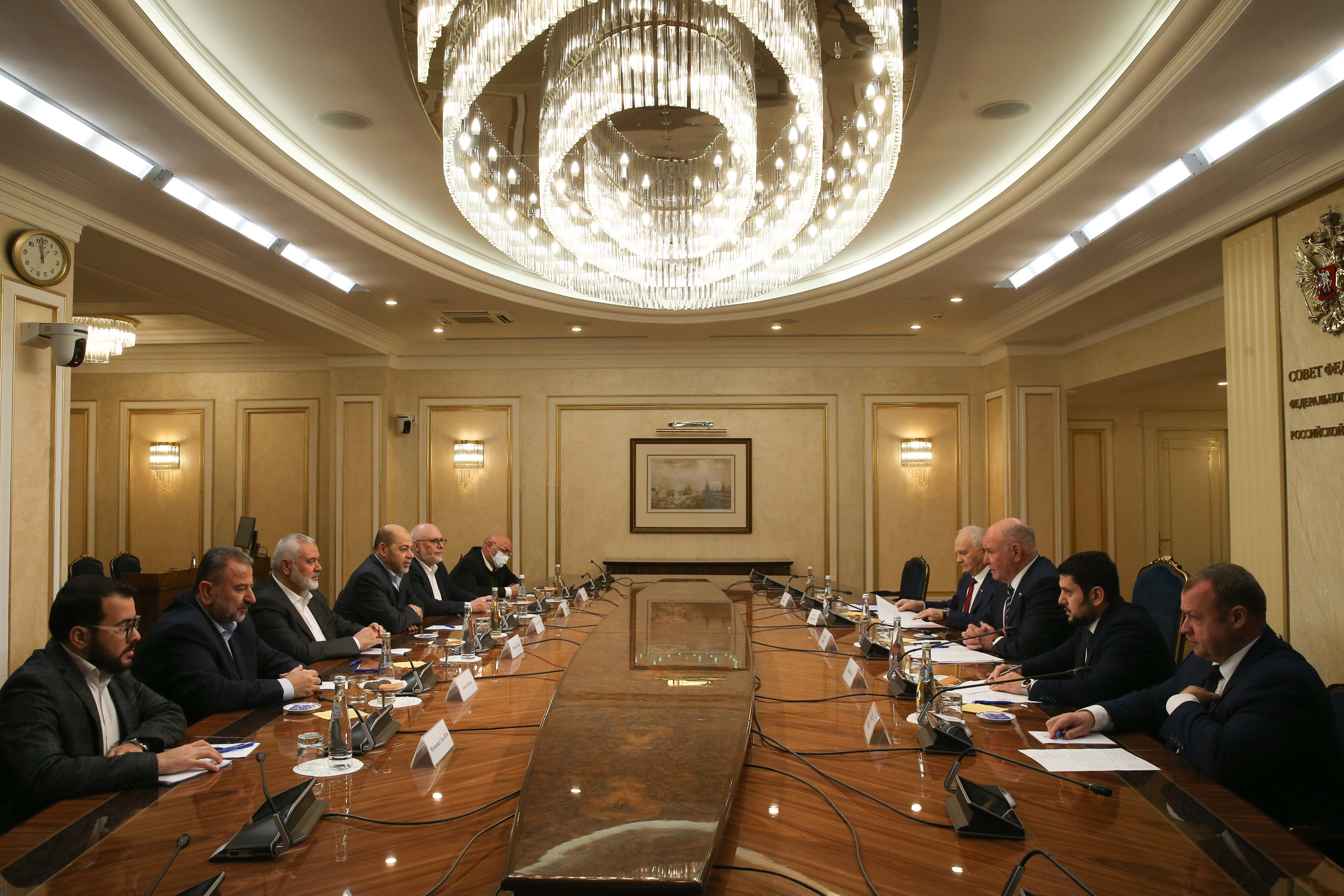
Mousa Abu Mazrook (next to Ismail Haniyeh) in Moscow, 13 September 2022

Marzook's parents were from Yibna, (now Yavne, Israel). During the 1948 Arab–Israeli War they were expelled to Rafah Camp in the Gaza Strip. Marzook was born there on 9 January 1951, the second of nine children. During the Six Day War, Marzook's brother Mahmud Abu Marzook joined a fighting force that became a military unit of the Palestine Liberation Organization. As a teenager in Rafah, Marzook was introduced to Sheikh Ahmed Yassin, a member of the secret leadership of the Egyptian Muslim Brotherhood.

Marzook completed high school in Gaza, studied engineering in Cairo from 1970 to 1976, and worked as an engineer in Abu Dhabi. By then, he was active in the Muslim Brotherhood. Marzook was an inaugural member of the board of the Islamic University of Gaza, founded by Islamists in 1978. Marzook travelled extensively throughout the Middle East during his years in Abu Dhabi, cultivating political and financial connections in support of his goal to establish an independent Islamist state in Palestine.

In 1982, he traveled to the United States on a student visa. Marzook earned a master's degree in construction management from Colorado State University, then a Doctorate degree in Industrial Engineering from Louisiana Tech University.

In 1991, he moved to Springfield, Virginia. Marzook lived in the U.S. for at least 14 years, obtaining a Green Card in 1990. He is married with six children.

== Hamas involvement ==
From the founding of Hamas at the end of 1987, Marzook became its leading political voice. Abu Marzook was elected as the first head of the Hamas Political Bureau in 1992, overseeing its operations from Northern Virginia under the United Association for Studies and Research. According to U.S. officials, up to 15 percent of Hamas's $70 million annual budget came from America. Journalist Shlomi Eldar credits Abu Marzook's fundraising prowess, and his connections to donors in Europe and the US with saving the organization and developing its infrastructure in Gaza, including social service programs. Israel claims that some funds were used for attacks against Israel, a charge that Abu Marzouk denies. Since 1997 has been deputy chairman of the Hamas Political Bureau. Marzook lived in Jordan from 1998 to 2001. He then moved to Damascus, Syria in 2001.

From 1991 until 1995, Marzook held secret talks with U.S. government officials as the leader of Hamas in the United States. During meetings, Marzook reportedly explained Hamas's conditions for talks with Israel and pledged not to conduct operations against the United States. According to U.S. officials, Marzook traveled to Tehran in October 1992 in his role as Hamas's de facto foreign minister. On August 1, 1993, Marzook reestablished the Hamas Political Bureau in Amman, returning to the United States three or four times per year to renew his green card and meet with U.S. officials. On July 1, 1995, Jordanian Prime Minister called Marzook and expelled him from Jordan, claiming pressure from Israel. Israel held Marzook responsible for overseeing segments of Hamas that killed 47 Israelis between 1990 and 1994, claimed by Hamas' military wing.

Marzook founded the Islamic Association of Palestine.

=== Arrest in U.S. ===
Officials from the Immigration and Naturalization Service arrested Marzook upon arrival at John F. Kennedy Airport in New York City on 27 July 1995 due to his presence on a terrorist watch list. American and Israeli authorities claimed that Marzook was the head of Hamas's political committee and set the group's political and strategic policy, including sanctioning its use of terrorist attacks. Others described Marzook as Hamas's de facto foreign minister, a public face and key fundraiser. Marzook was held at the Manhattan Correctional Center. Marzook's attorney Stanley L. Cohen acknowledged that Marzook supported Hamas, but denied he was a leader. However, Imad Falouji, leader of Hamas in Gaza, who Marzouk appointed, virtually acknowledged he was a Hamas leader.

A U.S. judge concluded there was "probable cause" Marzook was linked to bombings in Israel. Two months after Marzouk's arrest, Israel requested the United States extradite him. Cohen continues to legally represent Marzook.

== Hamas leadership post-imprisonment ==
After spending 22 months in prison, Marzook was deported to Jordan in May 1997 after Israel dropped its demand for his extradition. As part of the deal, Marzook relinquished his U.S. residency. At a news conference, Marzook said Hamas would no longer target Israeli civilians, but refused to condemn acts of violence against Israelis. He admitted to leading Hamas' political wing.

In 2003, the Central Bank of Jordan froze the assets of Hamas leaders, including Marzook as a politburo member. The assets of politburo chief Khaled Mashal, founder Ahmed Yassine, and senior officials Osama Hamdan and Imad al-Alami were also frozen.

After Ismail Haniyeh was elected as deputy head of Hamas by the Hamas Shura Council in April 2013, Marzook was appointed as one of two deputies to Haniyeh. Marzook was responsible for all external issues, while Khaled Mishaal was responsible for issues within the Palestinian Territories.

== Living in exile ==
In 2012, Marzook was living in New Cairo, Egypt. At the outbreak of the Gaza war in 2023, Marzook was residing in Doha, Qatar.

== Criminal charges in the US ==
Marzook was listed as a Specially Designated Terrorist by the U.S. Treasury Department in 1995, and is currently on the renamed Treasury department Specially Designated National list under such alternative spellings of his name as Dr. Musa Abu-Marzuq, Sa'id Abu-Marzuq, Mousa Mohamed Abou Marzook, Musa Abu Marzouk, and Musa Abu Marzuk, and under the alias "Abu-'Umar."

In 2002, a federal grand jury in Dallas returned an indictment against Marzook for conspiring to violate U.S. laws that prohibit dealings in terrorist funds. The indictment alleged that Marzook had conspired with the Richardson, Texas-based InfoCom Corporation and five of its employees to hide his financial transactions with the computer company. He allegedly invested $250,000 in InfoCom, with Infocom to make payments to Marzook based on the company's net profits or losses.

In 2004, Ismail Elbarasse was detained by police in Maryland west of the Chesapeake Bay Bridge after Baltimore County police officers said they saw a woman (his wife) in the vehicle videotaping the Bridge, including footage of the cables and upper supports of the main span. Elbarasse was an assistant to Mousa Mohammed Abu Marzook, and was named an unindicted co-conspirator by a grand jury in Chicago after authorities searched the home and vehicle of Elbarasse and found bank records belonging to Marzook, deputy chief of Hamas's political wing. A federal indictment charged Marzook in an alleged conspiracy that authorities said raised millions of dollars for Hamas.

In 2004, a U.S. court indicted him in absentia for coordinating and financing Hamas activities.

== Political views ==
=== Interview with The Forward ===
In April 2012, Marzook gave what was billed as his "first-ever interview with a Jewish publication", The Forward. Marzook said that an agreement between Israel and the P.A. would have to be ratified by a referendum of all Palestinians, including those in Gaza. He would regard it as a hudna, or cease-fire, rather than as a peace treaty. If Hamas gained power, they would feel free to change provisions of the agreement. "We will not recognize Israel as a state", he said. "It will be like the relationship between Lebanon and Israel or Syria and Israel", that is, an armistice.

The Forward requested the interview, which took place over two days at Marzook's home in New Cairo, Egypt. The Forward published responses to the interview from eight "prominent observers of the Middle East peace process", Laura Kam of The Israel Project, Israeli security analyst Yossi Alpher, Lara Friedman of Americans for Peace Now, Princeton University Professor Daoud Kuttab, Abraham Foxman of the Anti-Defamation League, Arab-American activist Hussein Ibish, David Keyes of Advancing Human Rights and political scientist Nathan Brown.

=== 2012 Gaza war ===
Following the eight-day cross-border battle between Israel and Hamas in November 2012, Moussa Abu Marzouk said that Hamas would not stop making weapons in Gaza or smuggling them to the territory. According to the Associated Press, Moussa Abu Marzouk is the No. 2 leader in Hamas.

=== Gaza war ===
In separate interviews with the BBC and the Economist after the October 7 attacks, Marzook refused to acknowledge that Hamas killed civilians during the attack. When asked about the Nova music festival massacre, Marzouk replied that it was a "coincidence", and that the attackers may have thought these were soldiers "resting".

When asked why Hamas built 500 km of tunnels but not shelters for civilians in Gaza, Abu Marzuk said that the tunnels are built to protect Hamas fighters, while it is the responsibility of UN to protect the civilians.

In February 2025, Marzuk said that if he had been aware of the destruction that the October 7 attacks on Israel would cause in Gaza, he would not have supported it.

In November 2025, Abu Marzuk told Al Jazeera that Hamas would consider giving up missiles and rockets as part of a truce with Israel.

== Notes and references ==
=== Sources ===
- Levitt, Matthew (2006). Hamas: Politics, Charity, and Terrorism in the Service of Jihad. Yale University Press. ISBN 978-0-300-12258-9.
- Gaess, Roger (May 1997). "Interview with Mousa Abu Marzook". Middle East Policy. 5 (2): 113–128. doi:10.1111/j.1475-4967.1997.tb00268.x.
- "How Historic Interview Was Arranged". The Forward. 19 April 2012.
