= Federal Correctional Institution, Seagoville =

Low-security prison in Texas, US

Coordinates: 32°39′18″N 96°34′03″W

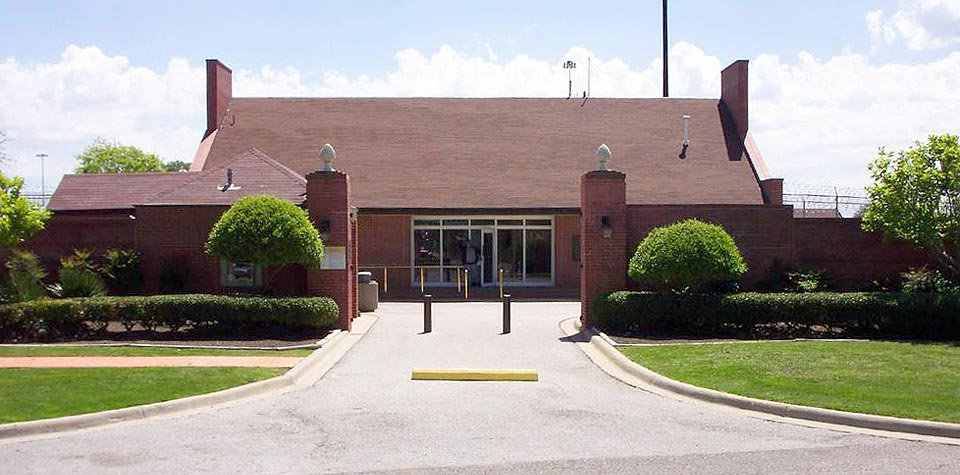
- Interactive map of Federal Correctional Institution, Seagoville
- Location: Seagoville, Texas
- Status: Operational
- Security class: Low-security (with minimum-security prison camp)
- Population: 1,800 (170 in prison camp)
- Managed by: Federal Bureau of Prisons
- Warden: Kristi Ciolli

The Federal Correctional Institution, Seagoville (FCI Seagoville) is a low-security United States federal prison for male inmates in Seagoville, Texas in the Dallas-Fort Worth metropolitan area. It is operated by the Federal Bureau of Prisons, a division of the United States Department of Justice. The facility includes a detention center for male offenders and an adjacent satellite prison camp that houses minimum security-male offenders.

FCI Seagoville is located 11 miles (18 km) southeast of Downtown Dallas.

== History ==
The Federal Reformatory for Women in Seagoville opened on October 10, 1940. After the attack on Pearl Harbor, the government converted the center into a Federal Detention Station, monitored by the Immigration and Naturalization Service, that housed people of Japanese, German, and Italian descent who were classified as "enemy aliens," including women deported from Latin America into U.S. custody. Many of the Latin American internees had been classified officially as "voluntary internees" because they had chosen to leave their home countries after their husbands had been deported to the U.S., however, their choice was in many cases motivated by the difficulties of supporting themselves and their families alone. Internees at Seagoville published a German language newsletter called the Sägedorfer Fliegende Blätter. Beginning in June 1943, the State Department arranged for the deportation of many of the internees to Japan and Germany, which helped decrease the population as authorities prepared to transfer the remaining detainees to Crystal City, Texas. Seagoville held a total of some 650-700 people, and was closed in June 1945.

After World War II ended, on June 25, 1945 the prison became a facility for minimum security male offenders. In 1969, the facility's mission changed to that of housing young male offenders sentenced under the Youth Corrections Act. At the time the maximum age of the prisoners was 27.

In 1979, the facility's mission changed into that of a Federal Prison Camp. In 1981, a perimeter fence was installed and the facility became a Federal Correctional Institution. The adjacent Federal Detention Center opened in 1996. FDC Seagoville celebrated its 60th anniversary on October 10, 2000.

== Facility ==
The prison facility is located on an 830-acre (340 ha) tract. Built for $1.8 million, it occupies a portion of the acreage. In World War II single detainees occupied dormitories while couples resided in "Victory Huts", prefabricated one room buildings with measurements of 18 square feet (1.7 m^{2}) each.

== Notable incidents ==
On November 8, 2012, 27-year-old John Hall, an inmate at FCI Seagoville, pleaded guilty to violating the Matthew Shepard and James Byrd Jr. Hate Crimes Prevention Act for assaulting a fellow inmate whom he believed to be gay. Hall admitted that on December 20, 2011, he repeatedly punched and kicked the victim, whom the Department of Justice did not identify, while calling the victim homophobic slurs. The victim sustained multiple lacerations to his face and fractured teeth as a result of Hall's unprovoked attack. On March 14, 2013, Hall was sentenced to an additional 71 months in prison for the attack, which is to be served consecutively.

== Notable inmates (current and former) ==
Inmate	Register Number	Status	Details
James Henry Dolan			Organized crime figure imprisoned at Seagoville for impersonating an Internal Revenue Service agent.
Josh Duggar	42501-509	Now at FCI Elkton; scheduled release in 2033.	Former lobbyist and reality television personality from the TLC series 19 Kids and Counting. He was found guilty of receiving and possessing child sexual abuse materials, and sentenced for receipt of said materials.
Chris Epps	10095-042	Sentenced to 19.6 years; scheduled release in 2032.	Former Commissioner of the Mississippi Department of Corrections, convicted of taking $1.4 million in bribes from contractors related to Operation Mississippi Hustle
Richard Clark	10095-042	Sentenced to 151 months; released in 2021	Father of St. Vincent who was convicted in 2010 of conspiracy and money laundering.
Ruben Verastigui	29014-509	Sentenced to 12.5 years; scheduled release in 2031.	Ex-aide of the GOP who was an anti-abortion activist. Charged with possessing child pornography.
Douglas Perlitz	36435-013	Sentenced to 19.6 years; released in 2025.	Former director of the Project Pierre Toussaint School in Cap-Haitien, Haiti. Perlitz confessed to sexually abusing eight homeless children at the center after showing them pornography, bribing them with food, money, clothing and electronics, and threatening to expel them if they told anyone. He is suspected of abusing dozens more young boys.
Jacques Roy	44132-177	Now at FMC Fort Worth; scheduled release in 2040.	Physician; indicted in 2012 for conspiracy to commit healthcare fraud for allegedly masterminding the largest healthcare fraud in US history, which involved 11,000 patients and resulted in $375 million being fraudulently billed to Medicare and Medicaid.
Ralph Shortey	31860-064	Sentenced to 15 years; scheduled release in 2030.	Former Republican member of the Oklahoma Senate. Indicted in 2017 for child sex trafficking, to which he pled guilty and has been jailed since November 30, 2017.
Fernando Rivas	23452-171	Sentenced to 15 years; scheduled release in 2026.	Composer for several TV Shows such as Sesame Street, Handy Manny. Won two Emmy awards for his music department's work on Sesame Street. Indicted in 2011, Rivas was sentenced to 15 years in prison for creating and sending child pornography.
Austin Wolf	22682-511	Serving a 19-year sentence; scheduled release in 2040.	Wolf, whose real name is Justin Heath Smith, is a gay adult film star and content creator. He was arrested in June 2024 and charged with possessing and distributing hundreds of videos of child pornography.
Mufid Abdulqader	32590-177	Released in 2025.	Former Chief Fundraiser for the Holy Land Foundation, once the largest Islamic charity in the US; convicted in 2008 of providing material support for terrorism for funneling money to the terrorist organization Hamas. Four co-conspirators were also sentenced to prison.
Muhammed Nasiru Usman	38671-177	Sentenced to 15 years, served 10, and released on March 16, 2021.	Father of former UFC champion Kamaru Usman. Convicted of running a healthcare fraud scheme under an ambulance company which defrauded the government of more than $3.5 million dollars. Was ordered to pay $1.3 million dollars in restitution.
Yahya al-Bahrumi	35026-177	Sentenced to 34 months of imprisonment, released on October 1, 2008.	Future jihadist and Islamic scholar; in April 2006 arrested for attempting to hijack the website of the American Israel Public Affairs Committee.

== COVID-19 outbreak ==
On August 8, 2020, CNN reported that 1,300 of the 1,750 prisoners (75% of the inmates) had tested positive for COVID-19. Twenty-eight of the 300 staff members had tested positive as well. As of August 8, 2020, three inmates have died. "It came through here so fast that it's out of control," said inmate Bobby Williams, who contracted the virus in June. "We're packed like sardines."

== See also ==
- List of U.S. federal prisons
- Federal Bureau of Prisons
- Incarceration in the United States
