= Matthew Levitt =

American political scientist (born 1970)

- Born: 6 November 1970 (age 56); United States
- Citizenship: United States
- Occupations: political scientist; expert witness

Academic background
- Education: Yeshiva University; Tufts University; Fletcher School of Law and Diplomacy; Maimonides School

Academic work
- Era: War on terror
- Discipline: Terrorism; U.S. Policy; Lebanon; Palestinians; Hamas
- Institutions: The Washington Institute for Near East Policy (WINEP)

Matthew Levitt is an American political scientist specializing in international terrorism. He is a director at the Washington Institute for Near East Policy and an adjunct professor at Georgetown University. The Jerusalem Post describes Levitt as an expert on Hamas.

== Biography ==
Levitt serves as the Fromer-Wexler Fellow and director of the Jeanette and Eli Reinhard Program on Counterterrorism and Intelligence at the Washington Institute for Near East Policy and an adjunct professor in Georgetown University's Center for Security Studies (CSS). From 2005 to early 2007 he was a deputy assistant secretary for intelligence and analysis at the U.S. Department of the Treasury. In that capacity, he served both as a senior official within the department's terrorism and financial intelligence branch and as deputy chief of the Office of Intelligence and Analysis. From 2001 to 2005, Levitt served the Institute as founding director of its Terrorism Research Program (now renamed as above), which was established in the wake of the September 11 attacks. Previously, he provided tactical and strategic analytical support for counter-terrorism operations at the FBI, focusing on fundraising and logistical support networks for Middle Eastern terrorist groups. At the FBI, Levitt supported operations during high-profile terrorism alerts, including around the 1999–2000 millennium celebrations and the September 11 attacks.

Levitt has also lectured on international terrorism on behalf of the Departments of State, Justice, Defense, and Homeland Security, consulted for various U.S. government agencies and private industry, and testified before the Senate and House on matters relating to international terrorism. He is a term member of the Council on Foreign Relations, a member of the international advisory board for both the Institute for Counter-terrorism in Israel and the International Centre for Political Violence & Terrorism Research in Singapore, and a CTC fellow with the Combating Terrorism Center (CTC) at the U.S. Military Academy (West Point). He serves on the advisory board of Foundation for Defense of Democracies' Center on Sanctions and Illicit Finance (CSIF) and formerly served on the academic advisory board for the Emirati Center for Strategic Studies and Research (ECSSR). Levitt was a graduate research fellow at Harvard Law School's Program on Negotiation and previously taught at Johns Hopkins University's Paul H. Nitze School of Advanced International Studies (SAIS) and Zanvyl Krieger School of Arts and Sciences.

Levitt received his B.A. from Yeshiva University and his M.A. and Ph.D. from The Fletcher School of Law and Diplomacy at Tufts University. He attended high school at the Maimonides School.

Levitt has written extensively on terrorism, countering violent extremism, illicit finance and sanctions, the Middle East, and Arab-Israeli peace negotiations, and has published articles in outlets including The Wall Street Journal, The Washington Post, Foreign Affairs, Foreign Policy, and numerous other publications.

Levitt was an expert witness during eight trials against terrorism suspects between 2004 and 2008, including the 2005 trial of Mohammed Ali Hassan Al-Moayad, Sami Al-Arian, and the Holy Land Foundation.

== Books ==
- Hezbollah: The Global Footprint of Lebanon's Party of God (Georgetown University Press, 2013)
- Hamas: Politics, Charity, and Terrorism in the Service of Jihad (Yale University Press, 2006)
- Targeting Terror: U.S. Policy toward Middle Eastern State Sponsors and Terrorist Organizations, Post-September 11 (Washington Institute for Near East Policy, 2002)
- Negotiating Under Fire: Preserving Peace Talks in the Face of Terror Attacks (Lanham: Rowman & Littlefield, 2008)
