= Al-Arian (surname) =

Al-Arian (Arabic: العريان) is a surname, also spelled Alarian or el-Erian. Notable people with the surname include:

- Laila Al-Arian, American broadcast journalist
- Sami Al-Arian (born 1958), Kuwaiti activist
- Tarek Alarian, Egyptian and Palestinian film director
- Abdullah El-Erian, Egyptian jurist
- Essam el-Erian (1954–2020), Egyptian physician and politician
- Mohamed El-Erian, Egyptian-American economist
- Sherif El-Erian (born 1970), Egyptian pentathlete
