= Daveed Gartenstein-Ross =

American counter-terrorism expert

- Born: 1976 (age 49–50)
- Education: Wake Forest University, B.A.; New York University School of Law, J.D. magna cum laude; Catholic University of America, M.A., PhD
- Website: https://valensglobal.com/about-DGR/

Daveed Gartenstein-Ross (born 1976) is an author. In 2011, Gartenstein-Ross wrote Bin Laden's Legacy: Why We're Still Losing the War on Terror. He is currently a senior advisor on asymmetric warfare at the Foundation for Defense of Democracies.

== Career ==
After law school Gartenstein-Ross worked as a law clerk on the United States Court of Appeals for the DC Circuit, and was subsequently employed in a New York City law firm. Following his work as a litigator, Gartenstein-Ross served at Steven Emerson's Investigative Project on Terrorism and started his own counter-terrorism consulting business.

Gartenstein-Ross is the author of From Energy Crisis to Energy Security> and The Afghanistan-Pakistan Theater: Militant Islam, Security and Stability. His writings on political violence have been published in Middle East Quarterly, The Atlantic, The Journal of International Security Affairs, The New York Times, The Wall Street Journal Europe, Foreign Policy, The Times of India, and Foreign Affairs.

In 2015, he was given the Outstanding New Director award by the American Debate Association.

He has given testimony on political violence to the United States Senate Committee on Homeland Security and Governmental Affairs, and the United States House Committee on Financial Services.

== Bin Laden's Legacy ==
In 2011, Gartenstein-Ross wrote Bin Laden's Legacy: Why We're Still Losing the War on Terror. The central argument of the book is that in the decade since 9/11, the U.S. has grown weaker: It has been bogged down by costly wars in Iraq and Afghanistan. While the book was widely received with positive reviews, there have been criticism of the feasibility of some of the policy prescriptions found in the final chapter.
