= Terrorists Among Us: Jihad in America =

- VHS cover art
- Starring: Steven Emerson
- Country of origin: United States
- Original language: English

Production
- Producer: Steven Emerson
- Running time: 65 minutes
- Production company: SAE Productions

Original release
- Network: PBS
- Release: 1994

Terrorists Among Us: Jihad in America is a documentary by Steven Emerson. It first aired in the United States in 1994 on PBS. The documentary has won numerous awards for journalism, including the George Polk Award for best television documentary.

According to Emerson, the impetus for the documentary came in 1992, when he happened to come across a conference of Arab youths in Oklahoma City, Oklahoma. After gaining entrance by pretending to be Muslim, Emerson said that he found tables of pro-terrorism literature from groups such as Hamas and heard speeches calling for death to Americans.

The documentary features hidden camera footage of men publicly raising money for terrorism in U.S. hotel conference rooms. The men are often speaking in Arabic. Emerson also accused Sami Al-Arian of being the primary supporter of the Islamic jihad in the United States, and described Tampa as "a hotbed of Islamic extremism" and called the University of South Florida "Jihad University". He said that Al-Arian was an Islamic extremist, and headed the Palestine Islamic Jihad (PIJ) in the U.S. Al-Arian's trial was repeatedly delayed, and after many months it ended in acquittals on eight counts and a hung jury on nine other counts. After prosecutors threatened a re-trial in 2006, Al-Arian agreed to a plea deal. He pleaded guilty to one felony count of aiding the PIJ, a designated terrorist group, and was sentenced to 57 months in prison, most of which he had already served while in custody awaiting trial.

After the documentary's release, American Muslim groups such as the Council on American-Islamic Relations accused Emerson of mischaracterizing speeches and taking innocuous language and activities out of context to make them appear more menacing. The documentary was faulted for misrepresentations and bigotry, and Robert Friedman accused Emerson of "creating mass hysteria against American Arabs."

In 1995, U.S. representatives Bill McCollum of Florida and Gary Ackerman of New York distributed the videotape to every member of the House of Representatives, accompanied by a letter urging them to watch the documentary before the House began debating anti-terrorism legislation that summer. The move was decried by Arab American and Muslim leaders for linking terrorism to Arabs and Muslims.

Emerson and his work gained renewed attention following the September 11, 2001 attacks by terrorists on the United States; later in 2001, Representative Chris Smith of New Jersey credited Emerson's documentary with helping to pass a recent anti-terrorism bill in the House.

== See also ==
- American Jihad: The Terrorists Living Among Us
- Jihadist extremism in the United States
- Criticism of Islamism
