= Jonathan A. C. Brown =

American scholar of Islamic studies (born 1977)

Jonathan A.C. Brown
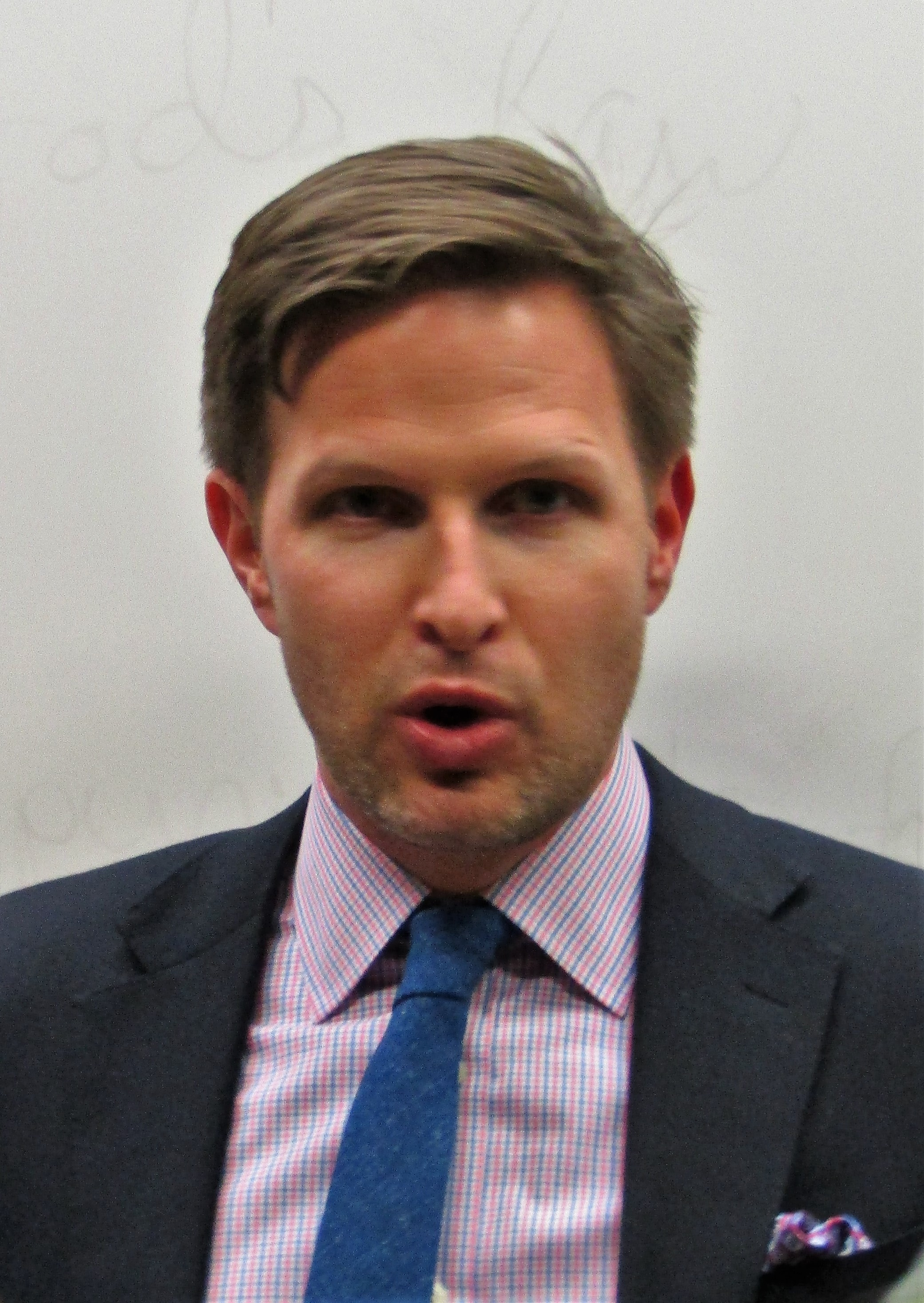
- Brown in 2018
- Born: August 9, 1977 (age 49); Washington, D.C., United States
- Education: Georgetown University (B.A.); University of Chicago (Ph.D.)
- Spouse: Laila Al-Arian
- Scientific career
- Workplaces: Georgetown University (2010-); University of Washington (2006–2010)
- Thesis: The Canonization of al-Bukhari and Muslim: the Formation and Function of the Sunni Hadith Canon (2006)
- Doctoral advisor: Wadad Kadi
- Website: drjonathanbrown.com

Jonathan Andrew Cleveland Brown (born August 7, 1977) is an American scholar of Islamic studies. Since 2012, he has served as a professor at Georgetown University's Edmund A. Walsh School of Foreign Service. He holds the Alwaleed bin Talal Chair of Islamic Civilization at Georgetown University. Brown is an advisor to the Yaqeen Institute for Islamic Research, where he formerly served as Director of Research.

== Background and education ==
Brown was born in Washington, D.C. He was raised as an Episcopalian. In 1997 while he was in college, prior to his 20th birthday, he converted to Islam. Brown is Sunni and follows the Hanbali school of Islamic jurisprudence.

Brown graduated magna cum laude with a Bachelor of Arts in History in 2000 from Georgetown University in Washington, D.C., studied Arabic for a year at the Center for Arabic Study Abroad at the American University of Cairo, and completed his doctorate in Islamic thought at the University of Chicago in 2006.

== Family ==
Jonathan is married to Laila Al-Arian, an American broadcast journalist for the Al Jazeera Media Network.

Brown is a descendant of former US president Grover Cleveland.

== Career ==
From 2006 to 2010 he taught in the Department of Near Eastern Languages and Civilization at the University of Washington in Seattle, where he was awarded tenure. He then gave up tenure to move to Georgetown in 2010. After serving as an assistant professor he was granted tenure again in 2012, teaching Islamic Studies and Muslim-Christian Understanding in the School of Foreign Service at Georgetown University. He is also a term member of the Council on Foreign Relations.

Brown served as the director of the Prince Alwaleed Bin Talal Center for Muslim-Christian Understanding until 2019.

In July 2025, Brown was placed on leave and removed as department chair by Georgetown after writing on X "I'm not an expert, but I assume Iran could still get a bomb easily. I hope Iran does some symbolic strike on a base, then everyone stops." He later wrote "I deleted my previous tweet because a lot of people were interpreting it as a call for violence. That's not what I intended. I have two immediate family members in the US military who've served abroad and wouldn't want any harm to befall American soldiers."

== Publications and speeches ==
Brown has published work on Hadith, Islamic law, Sufism, Arabic lexical theory and Pre-Islamic poetry and is currently focused on the history of forgery and historical criticism in Islamic civilization and modern conflicts between late Sunni Traditionalism and Salafism in Islamic Thought.

=== Misquoting Muhammad (book) ===
In his book Misquoting Muhammad, Brown argues that the "depth and breadth" of the early Muslim scholars' achievement in assessing the authenticity of sayings and texts "dwarfed" that of the Fathers of the Christian Church. The book received a number of positive reviews, and was named as one of the top books on religion of 2014 by The Independent. One review of the book in a Catholic journal praised the book calling it "generous to a fault when it comes to remarks about Christianity."

=== Writings on slavery ===
In a 2017 article, Brown stated that "the term 'slavery' is so ambiguous as to be functionally useless for the purposes of discussing extreme domination and exploitation across history", especially in the context of Islamic history. Brown wrote that the current understanding of "slavery" is defined primarily in terms of legal ownership and violations of autonomy. According to Brown, this understanding does not accurately reflect the way slavery was practiced in many times and places in the Islamic world. For example, some enslaved Ottoman officials held authority over free people, while some forms of extreme exploitation happened to legally free persons. Brown writes that while slavery's evil "is so morally clear and so widely acknowledged", and that it is the "Hitler of human practices", he also wishes to challenge the current understanding of slavery.

A lecture presenting this article, and in particular comments Brown made during the Q&A session, sparked criticism from a number of commentators, some of whom accused Brown of supporting slavery and rape. In addition, some liberal scholars of Islam criticized Brown for relativizing the concepts of slavery, human autonomy, and consent, and took issue with his suggestion that Muslims cannot view all historical forms of slavery to be immoral since the Islamic prophet Muhammad had owned slaves.

In response, Brown wrote on Twitter, "Islam as a faith and I as a person condemn slavery, rape and concubinage." In a subsequent essay and interview Brown elaborated his views and apologized for having addressed the subject too cerebrally, adding that members of the alt-right had bombarded him and his family with threats of death and rape over the controversy.

=== Remarks on grooming ===
On April 1, 2026, British Member of Parliament Rupert Lowe wrote a publication on X linking Islam to the grooming gangs scandal. Brown replied "Get over it." When another user called his remark "absurdly evil", Brown repeated it. He then deleted his account.

== Selected works ==
- Islam and Blackness, Oneworld Publications, 2022 | 416 p | ISBN 978-0861544844
- Slavery and Islam, Oneworld Publications, 2019 | 448 p | ISBN 978-1786076359
- Misquoting Muhammad: The Challenge and Choices of Interpreting the Prophet's Legacy, Oneworld Publications, 2014 | 384 p | ISBN 978-1780744209
- Muhammad: A Very Short Introduction, Oxford University Press, 2011 | 160 p | ISBN 978-0199559282
- Hadith: Muhammad's Legacy in the Medieval and Modern World, Oneworld Publications, Foundations of Islam series, 2009 | 320 p | ISBN 978-1851686636
- The Canonization of al-Bukhārī and Muslim: The Formation and Function of the Sunnī Ḥadīth Canon, Brill Publishers, 2007 | 434 p | ISBN 978-9004158399

== See also ==
- Yasir Qadhi
- Dalia Mogahed
- Omar Suleiman
- Hamza Yusuf
- Shabir Ally
- Suhaib Webb
