= Steven Emerson =

American investigative journalist and author (born 1954)

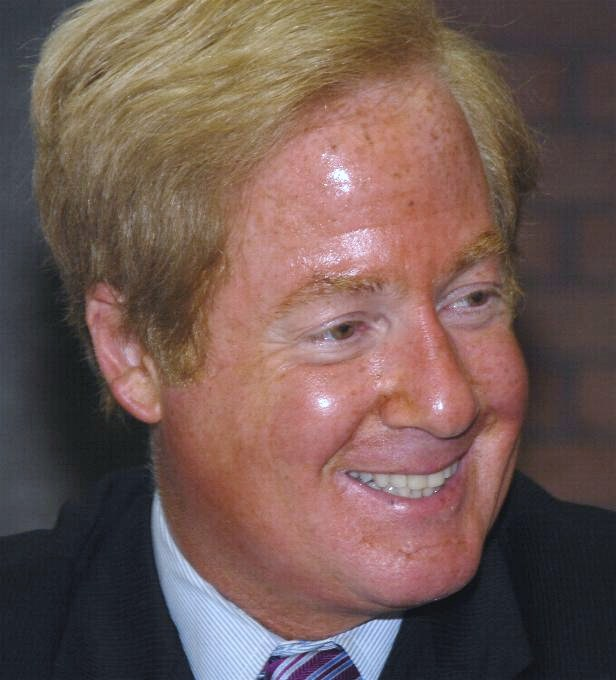
- Emerson in 2008
- Born: June 6, 1954 (age 72); United States
- Education: Brown University (B.A., 1976; M.A., 1977)
- Occupations: Journalist, author, executive director of the Investigative Project on Terrorism (IPT)
- Writing career
- Subjects: National security, terrorism, Islamic extremism
- Notable work: Terrorists Among Us: Jihad in America
- Notable awards: 1994 George Polk Award for best television documentary; top prize for best investigative report from Investigative Reporters and Editors

Steven Emerson (born June 6, 1954) is an American investigative journalist, author, and pundit on national security, terrorism, and Islamic extremism. He is the founder and director of The Investigative Project on Terrorism, and received a George Polk Award for the 1994 documentary Terrorists Among Us: Jihad in America.

== Education and early career ==
Emerson received a Bachelor of Arts from Brown University in 1976, and a Master of Arts in sociology in 1977. He went to Washington, D.C., in 1977 with the intention of putting off his law school studies for a year. He worked on staff as an investigator for the U.S. Senate Foreign Relations Committee until 1982, and as an executive assistant to Democratic Senator Frank Church of Idaho.

== Journalist and commentator ==
Emerson was a freelance writer for The New Republic, for whom he wrote a series of articles in 1982 on the influence of Saudi Arabia on U.S. corporations, law firms, public-relations outfits, and educational institutions. In their pursuit of large contracts with Saudi Arabia, he argued, U.S. businesses became unofficial, unregistered lobbyists for Saudi interests. He expanded this material in 1985 in his first book, The American House of Saud: The Secret Petrodollar Connection.

=== U.S. News & World Report and CNN ===
External videos
- Booknotes interview with Emerson and Brian Duffy on The Fall of Pan Am 103, May 13, 1990, C-SPAN

From 1986 to 1989 he worked for U.S. News & World Report as a senior editor specializing in national security issues. In 1988, he published Secret Warriors: Inside the Covert Military Operations of the Reagan Era, a strongly critical review of Ronald Reagan-era efforts to strengthen U.S. covert capabilities. Reviewing the book, The New York Times wrote: "Among the grace notes of Mr. Emerson's fine book are many small, well-told stories". In 1990, he co-authored The Fall of Pan Am 103: Inside the Lockerbie Investigation, which argued for the then-mainstream theory that Iran was behind the bombing of Pan Am Flight 103. Reviewing the book, The New York Times wrote: "Mr. Emerson and Mr. Duffy have put together a surpassing account of the investigation to date, rich with drama and studded with the sort of anecdotal details that give the story the appearance of depth and weight." The newspaper listed it as an "editors' choice" on their Best Sellers List, and cited it as a "notable book of the year".

In 1990, he joined CNN as an investigative correspondent and continued to write about terrorism. In 1991, he published Terrorist: The Inside Story of the Highest-Ranking Iraqi Terrorist Ever to Defect to the West, detailing how Iraq spread and increased its terror network in the 1980s with U.S. support.

=== Jihad in America ===
Emerson left CNN in 1993 to work on a documentary, Terrorists Among Us: Jihad in America, for the Public Broadcasting Service (PBS). It aired as "a PBS special" in November 1994.

In the documentary, he warned of future Islamic terrorist attacks in the United States. The Council on American-Islamic Relations (CAIR) noted that PBS denied requests by Arab and Muslim journalists to screen the program before its showing, and argued that Emerson was promoting "a wild theory about an Islamic terrorist network in America". Writing for The New York Times, Walter Goodman opined that the request to change or cancel the documentary was not justified, but that the concerns about Emerson's claims of an Islamic terrorist network were justified "since 'Jihad in America' is likely to awaken viewers' unease over what some Muslim groups here may be up to."

He received the 1994 George Polk Award for "Best Television Documentary." He also received the top prize for best investigative report from the Investigative Reporters and Editors Organization (IRE).

A review of the book by The New York Times's Ethan Bronner, says that conservatives and some Jewish organizations took Emerson seriously, but that others have dismissed him as "an obsessive crusader", and concludes that while Emerson sometimes connects unrelated dots, occasionally he can be wrong; but that as an investigator focusing on radical Islamic groups in the US, his information should be taken seriously but not just at face value.

=== Commentary ===
Emerson has made false claims about Muslims in the US and Europe; in particular, some of his claims during a Fox News segment about the relationship between British Muslims and the city of Birmingham were subsequently rebuked by the then British Prime Minister David Cameron and led to a censure of Fox News by Ofcom for the airing of the comments which the broadcasting regulator characterized as "materially misleading" and "a serious breach for a current affairs programme".

It was Emerson's 1994 documentary Jihad in America that first linked Sami Al-Arian to the Palestinian Islamic Jihad (PIJ). When in February 2003 the U.S. indicted Al-Arian, accusing him of being the North American leader of PIJ and financing and helping support suicide bombings, The New York Times noted that Emerson "has complained about Mr. Al-Arian's activities in the United States for nearly a decade." In 2006, Al-Arian pleaded guilty to conspiracy to help a "specially designated terrorist" organization, PIJ, and was sentenced to 57 months in prison, after a jury deadlocked on 9 charges (8 of which the government agreed to drop as part of the plea bargain) and acquitted him on another 8. Al-Arian said that he knew of the terrorist group's violent acts, though no evidence was admitted at trial showing that he was involved with violent acts.

In 1995 CBS interviews, prior to any knowledge the bombing of the Oklahoma City Federal Building was perpetrated by Timothy McVeigh, Emerson said "Oklahoma City, I can tell you, is probably considered one of the largest centers of Islamic radical activity outside the Middle East", and that the bombing "was done with the intent to inflict as many casualties as possible. That is a Middle Eastern trait, and something that has been generally not carried out on this soil until we were rudely awakened to it in 1993". He also told viewers not to believe Islamic groups' denials of their involvement. Emerson has said some critics fail to recite the rest of his statement that references the 1993 World Trade Center attack which was also carried out with a fertilizer truck bomb. Emerson indicated that he was one of many experts interviewed after the bombing who concluded there were similarities between the Oklahoma City bombing and Middle Eastern terrorism. He said the initial reporting did not "tar the entire Muslim community", that he referred only to a fanatical minority in the Islamic community. He acknowledged there were outbreaks of harassment which he referred to as unfortunate. In response to claims that all Muslims were blamed Emerson said "the charge of racism against Muslims is a canard designed to justify radical Islamic activities in this country." He supported the media's decision to report the possible link to Middle East terrorism, saying "There was no doubt" that the FBI and other law enforcement agencies suspected it.

In testimony on March 19, 1996, to the Senate Foreign Relations Committee, Emerson described the Holy Land Foundation as "the main fund-raising arm for Hamas in the United States." In 2007, federal prosecutors brought charges against Holy Land for funding Hamas and other Islamic terrorist organizations. In 2009, the founders of Holy Land were given life sentences for "funneling $12 million to Hamas."

In January 2001 it was reported that Emerson pointed out that the U.S. had missed clues that would have allowed it to focus on al-Qaeda early on. One of the men convicted in the World Trade Center bombing, Ahmad Ajaj, returned to the U.S. from Pakistan in 1992 with a bomb manual later seized by the U.S. An English translation of the document, entered into evidence in the World Trade Center trial, said that the manual was dated 1982, that it had been published in Amman, Jordan, and that it carried a heading on the front and succeeding pages: "The Basic Rule". But those were all errors, as Emerson pointed out. The heading said "al-Qaeda" – which translates as "The Base". In addition, the document was published in 1989, a year after al-Qaeda was founded, and the place of publication was Afghanistan, not Jordan.

== "Investigative Project on Terrorism" ==
The Investigative Project on Terrorism was founded by Emerson in 1995, shortly after the release of his documentary film, Terrorists Among Us: Jihad in America, which first aired in the United States in 1994 on PBS. The documentary was faulted for misrepresentation, and Robert Friedman accused Emerson of "creating mass hysteria against American Arabs." The think-tank, Center for American Progress (CAP), stated that the IPT was one of ten foundations constituting what it called "the Islamophobia network in America".

== Reception ==
In 1988, Emerson was referred to by The New York Times as "an expert on intelligence", and in 2015 as a "self-described terrorism expert". The New York Post referred to him prior to 1989 as "the nation's foremost journalistic expert on terrorism" The Los Angeles Times referred to Emerson as a terrorism expert, and as a Fox News commentator. He has also been regarded as a part of the counter-jihad movement. Some have called Emerson an Islamophobe.

Richard Clarke, former head of counter-terrorism for the United States National Security Council, said of Emerson, "I think of Steve as the Paul Revere of terrorism ... We'd always learn things [from him] we weren’t hearing from the FBI or CIA, things which almost always proved to be true."

Philip Jenkins, in his 2003 book, Images of terror: what we can and can't know about terrorism responded that certain groups criticize Emerson in order to silence and delegitimize his views.

Stephen Suleyman Schwartz wrote an article defending Emerson that attempted to explain why Islamists dislike him.

A review by Michael Wines in The New York Times of The Fall of Pan Am 103, while noting that the authors were "respected journalists" and "not to be lightly dismissed," and that they "talked to 250 people, including senior law enforcement and intelligence officials in seven nations", opined that charges of Iranian complicity were presented "without much substantiation" although Wines did go on to say that: "They build a convincing circumstantial case against Iran and its terrorist agents."

Adrienne Edgar, writing in The New York Times Book Review described Emerson and Cristina del Sesto's 1991 book Terrorist, as "marred by factual errors (such as mistranslations of Arabic names) and marked by "a pervasive anti-Arab and anti-Palestinian bias." Emerson and del Sesto responded: "We defy anyone to point to any passages that suggest such bias.... these characterizations of the book are wild figments of Ms. Edgar's political imagination."

In their report "Fear, Inc.: The Roots of the Islamophobia Network in America", the Center for American Progress accused Emerson of being an "misinformation expert" who, through his testimonies, exaggerates the presence of Sharia law in America and terrorism sympathizers in mosques.

Emerson has been criticized for espousing Islamophobic views by Islamic studies scholars such as Juliane Hamer and Omid Safi, with German media scholar Kai Hafez, and Carl Ernst naming Emerson along with Daniel Pipes as the two most prominent Islamophobic voices in the US. Emerson responded to these and similar characterizations in an op-ed for Fox News, stating that criticism of Islam labeled as Islamphophia, and the labeling of "Islamic terrorism" as a racist generalization of Muslims, is "one of the biggest and most dangerous national security frauds of the past 30 years."

Emerson's work was cited as an instance of poor reporting on Islam in the Sut Jhally film about Edward Said's Orientalism, specifically his claim after the Oklahoma City bombing that the municipality was a center of Muslim extremism.

== Controversies ==
=== Sami al-Arian case ===
Emerson has played a role in criminal prosecutions. In the widely criticized Sami Al-Arian case he was a major source of information and advice to the federal prosecutors and the Tampa Tribune. He has a close relationship to Gordon Kromberg, a federal prosecutor in the Eastern District of Virginia. The Holy Land Foundation prosecution relied on evidence produced by Emerson's Investigative Project.

=== Boston Marathon bombing ===
On April 17, 2013, Emerson stated on the Fox News program Hannity that he had been informed by an official in the US Immigration and Customs Enforcement (ICE) that a Saudi national who was present during the Boston Marathon bombing was suspected of playing a role in the bombing. Emerson wondered why a suspect would be deported and not prosecuted. Emerson reasoned that United States handles Saudi nationals differently to appease Saudi Arabia and not to embarrass the country. Homeland Security Secretary Janet Napolitano, whose department supervises the ICE, dismissed Emerson's allegation during a meeting with the House Homeland Security Committee, as being incorrect. United States officials stated that the injured Saudi national was regarded as a witness and not a suspect. A Saudi official at the embassy also stated that there was no known suspect or person of interest that they were aware of. On April 19, 2013, Steve Emerson was featured in an opinion piece on Fox News and referred to the suspects', Tamerlan and Dzhokhar Tsarnaev's, YouTube channels as being similar in tone to Al Qaeda videos. Many local, state and federal officials, including President Barack Obama, cautioned against jumping to conclusions while there's an ongoing investigation.

=== Comments on Fox News about Birmingham and Paris ===
In January 2015, following terrorist attacks in Paris, Emerson stated in an interview on Fox News that the city of Birmingham was populated entirely by Muslims and was a "no go area" for non-Muslims. According to an estimate from the UK Census of 2011, Birmingham is estimated to have 21.8% of its population identify as Muslim, with a Christian population of 46%, and 25% claiming no religion or not giving a religion. In the same interview, he claimed that in London, "Muslim religious police 'beat' anyone who doesn't dress according to Muslim, religious Muslim attire". The errors led to four apologies within 12 hours by Fox News. The UK media regulatory authority Ofcom found Fox News to be in breach of the UK's broadcasting code on account of the comments. Ofcom described the comments as "materially misleading" and "a serious breach".

In response to these comments, British Prime Minister David Cameron said that he "choked on his porridge" when he heard them and observed that Emerson was "clearly a complete idiot". Local MP Gisela Stuart described Emerson's remarks as "stupid" and that they had "no redeeming features". Emerson's remarks, which "embarrassed" Fox, extended to other countries, especially regarding supposed exclusion zones in Paris. Thousands of people ridiculed Emerson's comments on social media using the hashtag #FoxNewsFacts.

Emerson issued an apology for his misinformation stating, "I have clearly made a terrible error for which I am deeply sorry. My comments about Birmingham were totally in error." He further added that he would make a donation to a charity in Birmingham and also place a newspaper ad in Birmingham. It was also reported that Birmingham City Council welcomed his apology, describing Emerson's comments as "curious" and clearly without foundation. Sir Albert Bore, the leader of the council mocked Emerson writing "As I arrived for work at the Council House this morning I was full of awe and admiration for the many commuters who braved the 'no-go area' that is now Birmingham city centre" and described Emerson's remarks as "stupid, untrue and damaging...ridiculous".

=== Involvement in spying on American Muslim organizations ===
Emerson has recently been accused of spying on two different American Muslim organizations. On December 14, 2021, CAIR's Ohio chapter fired an executive who confessed to acting as a "mole" and passing confidential information to Steven Emerson's organization IPT. Shortly thereafter, another mole operating at a different Muslim organization came forward to CAIR and admitted to being paid $3,000 by Steven Emerson every month for recording discussions with prominent American Muslim leaders, amounting to a total of $100,000 over the course of four years.

== Works ==
=== Books ===
- The American House of Saud: The Secret Petrodollar Connection. Franklin Watts. 1985. ISBN 0-531-09778-1.
- Secret Warriors: Inside the Covert Military Operations of the Reagan Era. Putnam. 1988. ISBN 0-399-13360-7.
- The Fall of Pan Am 103: Inside the Lockerbie Investigation. Putnam. 1990. ISBN 0-399-13521-9. (with Brian Duffy)
- Terrorist: The Inside Story of the Highest-Ranking Iraqi Terrorist Ever to Defect to the West. Random House. 1991. ISBN 0-679-73701-4.
- The worldwide Jihad movement: Militant Islam targets the West. Institute of the World Jewish Congress. 1995.
- American Jihad: The Terrorists Living Among Us. Free Press. 2002. ISBN 0-7432-3435-9.
- Jihad Incorporated: A Guide to Militant Islam in the US. Prometheus Books. 2006. ISBN 1-59102-453-6.

=== Chapters ===
- Terrorism in the United States (1997), Vol. 69, # 1, "The Other Fundamentalists", Editor Frank McGuckin, H.W. Wilson Co., ISBN 0-8242-0914-1
- The future of terrorism: violence in the new millennium (1998), "Terrorism in America: The Threat of Militant Islamic Fundamentalism," Editor Harvey W. Kushner, SAGE, ISBN 0-7619-0869-2

=== Documentaries ===
- Terrorists Among Us: Jihad in America (1994)
- Obsession: Radical Islam's War Against the West (2005)
- Radical Islam: Terror in Its Own Words (2007)
- Jihad in America: The Grand Deception (2013)
