= The Only Game in Town =

The Only Game in Town may refer to:

- Only Game in Town, a 1992 album by The Warratahs
- The Only Game in Town (El-Erian book), a 2016 economics book by Mohamed A. El-Erian
- The Only Game in Town (play), a 1968 play by Frank D. Gilroy
- The Only Game in Town (1970 film), a drama film, based on the play
- The Only Game in Town (1979 film), a Canadian animated short film
