= USA vs. Al-Arian =

- Directed by: Line Halvorsen
- Written by: Line Halvorsen
- Produced by: Jan Dalchow
- Starring: Sami Al-Arian; Nahla Al-Arian; Abdullah Al-Arian; Laila Al-Arian; Leena Al-Arian; Ali Al-Arian; Lama Al-Arian; Linda Moreno; Paul I. Perez; David Cole
- Cinematography: Tone Andersen
- Edited by: Trond Winterkjaer; Line Halvorsen
- Music by: Stein Berge Svendsen
- Release date: 19 January 2007
- Running time: 102 minutes
- Country: Norway
- Languages: English; Arabic

USA vs AL-ARIAN is 2007 documentary film about Sami Al-Arian and his family during and after his federal trial on terrorism-related charges. It was directed by the Norwegian director Line Halvorsen.

According to the St. Petersburg Times, the film "glosses over the specific charges, and pays scant attention to the evidence." However Variety notes that, "Though unquestionably biased, eye-opening docu "USA vs Al-Arian" throws the spotlight on a justice system shanghaied by the Patriot Act, leaving a deeply sympathetic family frayed but not quite broken."

In the trial, the jury acquitted Al-Arian of nearly half the charges, and deadlocked on the remaining charges. After the trial, Al-Arian pleaded guilty in 2006 to conspiracy to help a terrorist organization, the Palestinian Islamic Jihad.

== Awards ==
- Audience Award, 2007 Tromsø International Film Festival
- Best Film, 2007 New Orleans Human Rights Film Festival, USA
- Grand Prix (Flugeprisen), 2007 Norwegian Documentary Film Festival Volda
- Honorary Mention, 2007 International Festival of Muslim Cinema "Golden Minbar", Russia
- Best Nordic Documentary, 2007 Nordisk Panorama – 5 Cities Film Festival
