= Mohamed El-Erian =

Egyptian-American businessman

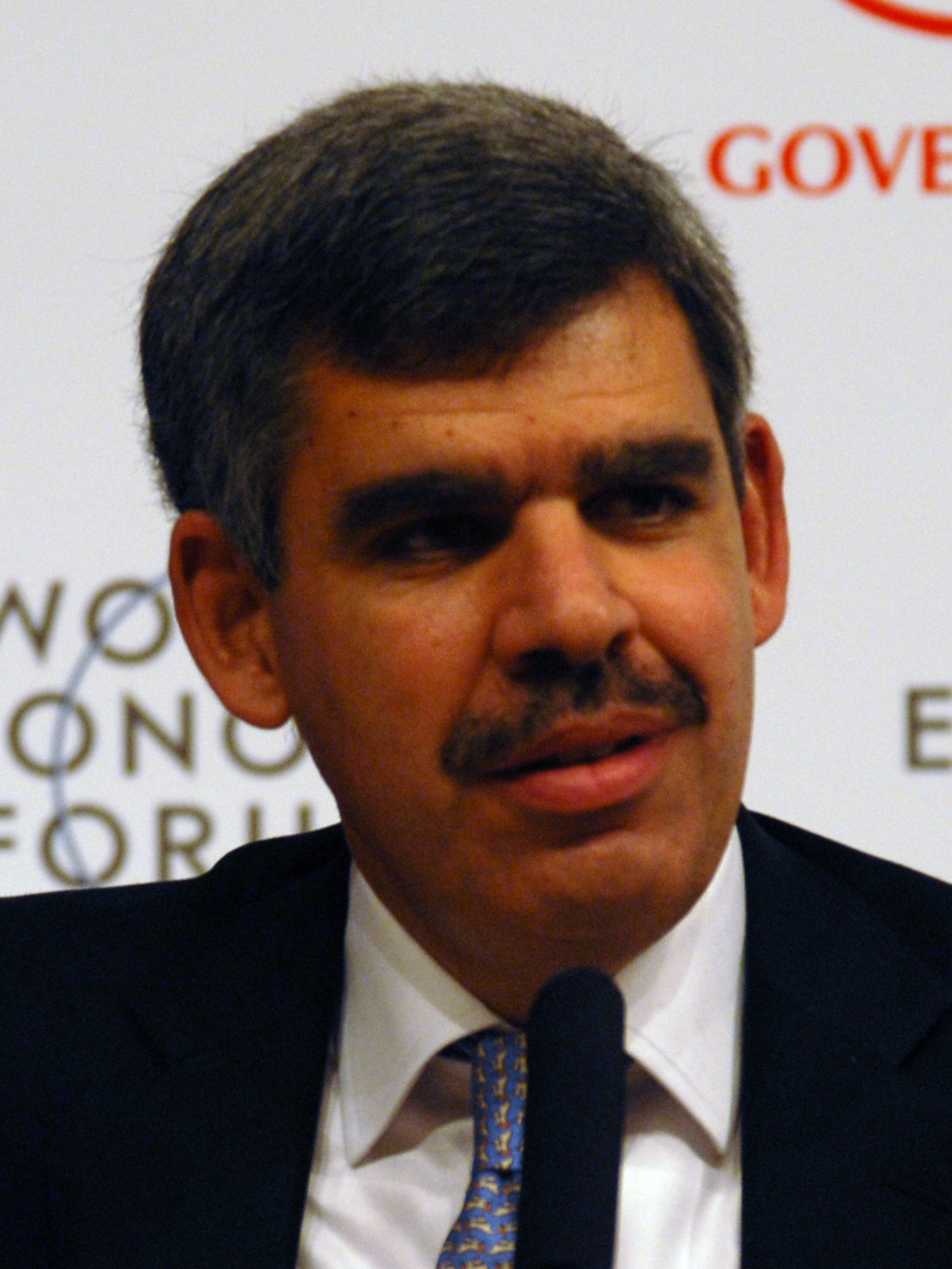
- El-Erian in 2008
- Born: Mohamed Aly El-Erian; August 19, 1958 (age 68); New York City, U.S.
- Education: Queens' College, Cambridge (BA); St Antony's College, Oxford (MPhil, DPhil)
- Known for: Former CEO of PIMCO

Mohamed Aly El-Erian (Arabic: محمد العريان, romanized: Muḥammad al-ʿAryān; born August 19, 1958) is an Egyptian-American economist and businessman. He was President of Queens' College, Cambridge, and chief economic adviser at Allianz, the corporate parent of PIMCO where he was CEO and co-chief investment officer (2007–14). He was chair of President Obama's Global Development Council (2012–17), and is a columnist for Bloomberg View, and a contributing editor to the Financial Times. El-Erian was a candidate in the 2025 University of Cambridge Chancellor election, coming second.

Since 2014, he has been on the panel of experts that judged and selected the Financial Times/McKinsey Business Book of the Year. He is also a regular contributor to Project Syndicate, Yahoo! Finance, Business Insider as well as Fortune/CNN and Foreign Policy. Named for four years in a row as one of Foreign Policy's "Top 100 Global Thinkers," he has written two New York Times bestsellers, including The Only Game in Town: Central Banks, Instability, and Avoiding the Next Collapse, published in January 2016 by Random House. Together with Sir Harvey McGrath, he co-chairs the capital campaign for Cambridge University. On July 1, 2019, El-Erian was appointed Senior Global Fellow at The Lauder Institute and part-time Professor of Practice at The Wharton School.

== Early life and education ==
El-Erian was born in New York City on August 19, 1958, to Egyptian parents Abdullah El-Erian, then an ambassador (later, a judge at the International Court of Justice), and Nadia Shoukry, a cousin of Egyptian politician Ibrahim Shoukry. Shortly after El-Erian's birth, the family moved back to Egypt, where he spent some of his early childhood along with short periods in Europe while his father attended meetings of the International Law Commission. In 1968, the family moved back to New York when his father took a position at the United Nations. From 1971–73, they lived in France while El-Erian's father was the Egyptian ambassador to that nation.

After attending St John's School, Leatherhead, a boarding school in England, he gained a scholarship to Queens' College, Cambridge, and received a first class bachelor's degree in economics in 1980. He later obtained a master's degree (1983) and a doctorate (1985) in economics from St Antony's College, Oxford.

== Career ==
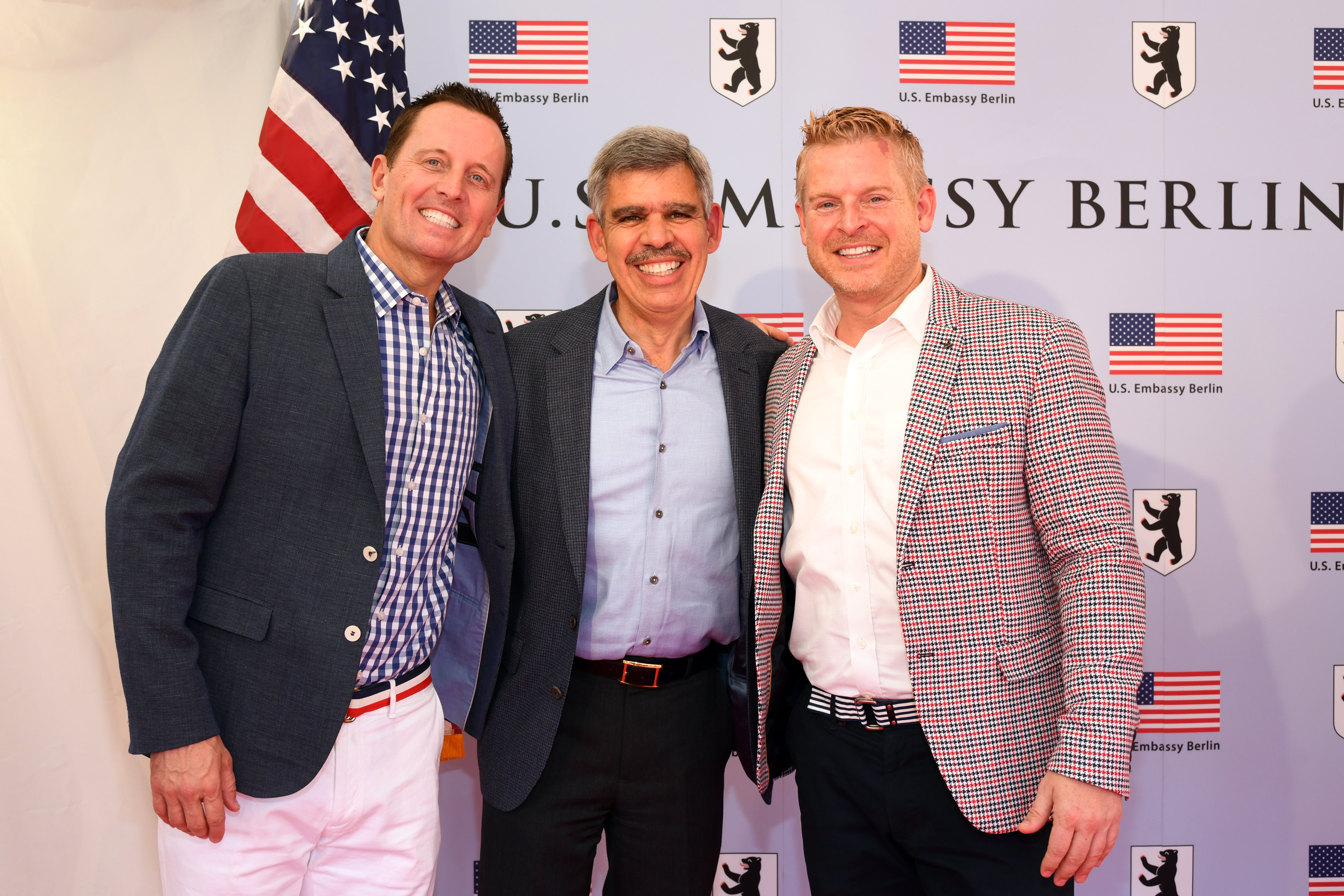
Mohamed A. El-Erian with Ambassador Richard Grenell and Matt Lashey, 4th of July 2018 in Berlin

After his studies at Oxbridge, El-Erian settled in the US in 1983, taking a position at the International Monetary Fund in Washington, D.C., where he rose to become deputy director. He moved to the private sector in January 1998, working in London at Salomon Smith Barney/Citigroup before being recruited by PIMCO to lead its work on emerging markets.

El-Erian worked for several years at PIMCO as a managing director and head of the emerging market portfolio team, where he earned notoriety by avoiding the 2001 bond default by Argentina that otherwise stung the international bond market. Subsequently, he was appointed CEO and president of Harvard Management Company, the entity that manages Harvard's endowment and related accounts. He also served as a member of the faculty of Harvard Business School. As of 2020, he is a member of the Harvard Global Advisory Council.

After twenty months at Harvard, El-Erian returned to PIMCO in December 2007 as CEO and co-CIO. As CEO of PIMCO, El-Erian was responsible for setting the strategic direction of the firm and leading its operations globally. As co-CIO with PIMCO co-founder Bill H. Gross, El-Erian oversaw investment policies and strategies for all the company's portfolio management activities. He helped deliver investment performance for clients and grow PIMCO's assets under management from under $1 trillion to $2 trillion.

On December 21, 2012, President Obama announced the appointment of El-Erian as the chair of the president's Global Development Council, leading the council in its role of informing and providing advice to the president and other senior U.S. officials on global development policies and practices.

On January 21, 2014, El-Erian resigned from PIMCO effective March of that year, stating he decided to leave after receiving a letter from his daughter outlining important events in her life that he missed. However, it was widely reported that his resignation was triggered by conflicts with Gross, raising questions about the company's succession plan as El-Erian was widely perceived as heir apparent to the 69-year-old Gross. Despite this, El-Erian praised Gross as "a brilliant investor ... anchored by three things that you hardly ever find in an investor: Strong fundamentals including economics, a really good feel for the market and strong bond math" when Gross departed Pimco.

El-Erian remains a member of the parent company's (Allianz) international executive committee, chairs its International Advisory Committee, and is an advisor to the management board.

El-Erian has published widely on international economic and finance topics. He is a member of the Financial Times "A-List" of writers, has a monthly column in Foreign Policy and is a contributing editor at the FT. He is also a regular op-ed contributor to Project Syndicate. His columns have appeared in The Atlantic, Bloomberg, The Economist, "Business Insider", Financial Times, Fortune, Newsweek, The Wall Street Journal, The Washington Post, The Financial Express, and other outlets. He is a columnist for Bloomberg. His first book When Markets Collide was a New York Times and Wall Street Journal bestseller. The book won the Financial Times and Goldman Sachs Business Book of the Year Award in 2008, was named a book of the year by The Economist, and called one of the best business books of all time by The Independent. His second book, The Only Game in Town: Central Banks, Instability, and Avoiding the Next Collapse, was also a New York Times bestseller.

El-Erian was named to Foreign Policy's list of Top 100 Global Thinkers each year from 2009 to 2012. He appears regularly on CNN, CNBC, and Bloomberg as well as other media outlets.

In April 2013, Foreign Policy named him as one of the 500 most powerful people on the planet. In 2017, he again was listed on Worth's "power 100." He was inducted into the Fixed Income Analysts Society Hall of Fame on April 14, 2011. In 2011, 2012, and 2013, he was included in Investment Advisor's annual IA 25 list honoring the most influential people in and around the advisor community. In December 2012, Marketwatch named him one of "30 leaders who will set the agenda in 2013" – the publication's annual list of the people who will shape economic currents in the coming year.

Worth Magazine, a publication focused on high-net-worth individuals, named El-Erian to its Power 100 list – "The 100 Most Powerful People in Finance" – in 2011, 2012, 2013, 2016 and 2017. In September 2012, he was given the Creative Leadership Award by the Louise Blouin Foundation. In February 2014, the Ukleja Center honored him with the 2014 Nell and John Wooden Ethics in Leadership award. In July 2014, the Egyptian Cancer Network gave him the Lifetime Achievement Award for his support of cancer treatment and cures for children in Egypt. In November 2015, The Middle East Institute in Washington DC honored him with their Visionary Award. The award recognizes outstanding leadership in international economic and financial policy, melding creativity and vision with expertise to promote global prosperity.

In February 2017, Richtopia ranked him 23rd in its list of top 100 economists in the world. In both 2016 and 2017, Linked-In recognized him as one of its top 3 "voices" among its "influencers." In 2017, he was named to Investment News's list of 20 market "Icons and Innovators." He has appeared regularly on the Orange County Business Journal's list of most influential personalities.

El-Erian has served on several boards and committees, including the U.S. Treasury Borrowing Advisory Committee, the International Center for Research on Women, the IMF's Committee of Eminent Persons, and the Peterson Institute for International Economics. He is currently a board member of the Carnegie Endowment for International Peace (Vice Chair), the NBER (Executive Committee), co-chair of the Capital Campaign for the University and Colleges of Cambridge and Cambridge in America. On March 18, 2015, El-Erian was admitted as Companion of the Guild of Benefactors, Cambridge University. He is also a board member of New America, King Abdullah University of Science and Technology (KAUST) and The Pegasus School. Since 2007, he has served as chair of the Microsoft Investment Advisory Committee. He is also a member of the Council on Foreign Relations and serves on the international advisory committees of Allianz and Investcorp. He is a member of the Council of Foreign Relations.

His philanthropic efforts over the years have emphasized education and health, including major gifts to the Children's Cancer Hospital in Egypt as well as the University of Cambridge and Queens' College. In October 2015, it was announced that, together with funding for studentships and new faculty positions, the El-Erian Institute for Human Behavior and Economic Policy would be established in partnership with Queens' College and the Faculty of Economics at Cambridge. The work of the institute will look to appropriately combine economics and finance with neuroscience, psychology, politics and behavioral finance to better understand how people actually make decisions rather than how narrow theory assumes they will.

El-Erian is a widely recognized thought leader and is credited with developing the post-2008 financial crisis concept of the "New Normal". Having first come up with the concept in January 2009 and after discussions with PIMCO, he wrote about it in May 2009 and presented it in several forums, including as the 2010 Per Jacobsson Foundation Lecture in Washington D.C. He has published numerous articles and commentaries on topics related to the New Normal, the sovereign debt crisis in Europe, the transformative changes occurring in the Middle East, and other matters related to the global economy, policy and markets.

El-Erian has spoken at many universities, public institutions and other organizations, including the University of California, Irvine, the New York Public Library, the University of Southern California, Cambridge, Oxford, the Newport Beach Public Library, the BIS, CFA Society of Chicago, HSBC, Barclays Bank, the UK Parliament’s House of Lords, SALT, Rand Merchant Bank, Marcus Evans, Mortgage Bankers Association, Insurance Bureau of Canada, World 50, and the 92nd Street Y. He has also spoken at CFA, FT, and Economist conferences. In November 2007, El-Erian was the series kick-off speaker of the MIT Egyptian Club. In 2010, he delivered the Per Jacobsson Foundation Lecture in Washington, D.C. In 2012 he was chosen to present the Homer Jones Memorial Lecture at the Federal Reserve Bank of St. Louis. In October 2012, he delivered the keynote Bagehot at The Economist's Buttonwood Gathering in New York. In November 2013, he delivered the luncheon speech at the IMF's Annual Research Conference that also featured Ben Bernanke, Olivier Blanchard, Stanley Fischer, Ken Rogoff, and Larry Summers. In October 2014, he spoke at HSBC and RBS. He participated in the international symposium of the Banque de France.

He was also the keynote speaker at the 2014 CME Conference along with Ben Bernanke and Colin Powell. He has also spoken before the Economic Club of Canada, Soka University, ProBono Economics, Boston Security Analysts, Rabobank, Citadel, ETF, National Rural Utilities Cooperative, Cisco, BTG Pactual, Euromoney, NMS, Mortgage Bankers Association, CME, Rabobank, the Global Financial Forum and many others. In March 2015 he was a featured speaker at the Egypt Economic Development Conference in Sharm El-Sheikh, Egypt. He also is a contributor to LinkedIn's Influencer series and was ranked third on their top 10 influencers of the year. In November 2015, he participated in the Fortune CEO Global Summit and was the keynote speaker at the CFA Society of Chicago. In December 2015, El-Erian was the keynote speaker at the Information Management Network Conference in Scottsdale, Arizona.

On July 1, 2019, El-Erian was appointed Senior Global Fellow at The Lauder Institute and Part-Time Professor of Practice at The Wharton School. He was President of Queens' College, Cambridge from October 1, 2020 to September 30, 2025.

El-Erian was ranked the top influencer by LinkedIn in 2016 and third in 2017.

El-Erian has served on the boards of trustees of several educational institutions, including Pegasus, St. Margaret School, Cambridge in America and KAUST. He co-chairs the capital campaign for Cambridge University. In March 2024, he was named chairman of the board of Under Armour.

== Personal life ==
Previously married to Jamie Walters, then to Minouche Shafik, El-Erian is now married to Anna Stylianides, who is from South Africa and is the executive director of Eco Oro Minerals Corp.

El-Erian is a New York Jets fan and has been known to appear on TV in a Jets jersey.

== Awards ==
In June 2011, El-Erian received an honorary doctorate degree from the American University in Cairo. In December 2013, he became an honorary fellow of Queens' College, Cambridge.

In September 2013, he was recognized as the Capital Markets Personality of the Year by Africa Investor, an international investment and communications group that publishes a leading magazine for Africa's investment decision makers.

In 2023, El-Erian won the Great Arab Minds Award in the economics category.

== Bibliography ==
- When Markets Collide: Investment Strategies for the Age of Global Economic Change, McGraw-Hill Professional, 2008. ISBN 978-0-07-159281-9.
- The Only Game in Town: Central Banks, Instability, and Avoiding the Next Collapse, Penguin Random House, 2016. ISBN 9780812997620.
