= American Jihad =

2003 book by Steven Emerson

American Jihad: The Terrorists Living Among Us
- Author: Steven Emerson
- Subject: Terrorism
- Publisher: Simon and Schuster
- Publication date: 2003
- Pages: 261
- ISBN: 0-7434-7750-2
- OCLC: 48811726

American Jihad: The Terrorists Living Among Us is a book by investigative journalist Steven Emerson, aiming to document the clandestine activities of Islamic terrorist groups such as Hamas in the United States.

Emerson seeks to explain the ideological motives of the global Islamic Jihad movements and he contends that their efforts are aimed at exploiting the freedoms prevalent in the West and the United States to infiltrate and develop various terrorist recruiting and financing networks and set the foundations for the destruction of the West.

Peter Probst reviewed the book for the Middle East Quarterly, writing: "In the best tradition of investigative reporting, Emerson has written a must-read account if one is to understand the events of September 2001, and more broadly, the threat posed by the Islamists in the United States." Writing for Military Review, Youssef Aboul-Enein wrote: "Emerson's book is important because it helps differentiate between the militant from the moderate Muslim and articulates the threat militant Islamic groups pose to Americans as well as to moderate and liberal Muslims."

A review of the book by The New York Times's Ethan Bronner, says that conservatives and some Jewish organizations took Emerson seriously, but that others have dismissed him as "an obsessive crusader", and concludes that while Emerson sometimes connects unrelated dots, occasionally he can be wrong; but that as an investigator focusing on radical Islamic groups in the US, his information should be taken seriously but not just at face value.
