= Yaqeen Institute =

Theological research institute

Yaqeen Institute for Islamic Research
- Formation: 2016; 10 years ago
- Founder: Omar Suleiman
- Type: Research Institute, non-profit
- Headquarters: 7750 N. MacArthur Blvd Suite 120237, Irving, TX 75063
- President: Omar Suleiman
- Director of Development: Tammam Alwan
- Research Director of Islam & Society: Tom Facchine
- Advisor: Jonathan Brown
- Revenue: $8,759,241 (2023)
- Expenses: $5,007,425 (2023)
- Website: yaqeeninstitute.org

The Yaqeen Institute for Islamic Research is an independent American research institute and think tank founded in 2016, mainly interested in the advanced study of modernity, Islam and Muslim societies. It works to aggregate complex Islamic topics for audiences outside of the field of Islamic academia. The institute had a revenue of nearly $9 million in 2023 and has $5 million in assets; it spends nearly $1 million per year publishing academic and peer-reviewed research papers.

Yaqeen Institute was founded by American Islamic scholar Omar Suleiman and is based in Irving, Texas. It has published works have covered a variety of topics at the intersection of Islam, including perennialism, international politics, parenting, and historical preservation of Islamic texts. It works to "pioneer Islamic research in cutting-edge, creative formats."

In 2021, Yaqeen Institute launched Yaqeen Curriculum, a researched, trademarked curriculum project for North American Islamic schools. The institute's "scholars, senior fellows [and] staff come from a diverse range of positions within Islamic orthodoxy."

== Work ==
Yaqeen Institute publishes three primary categories of content: research articles, infographics, and videos. Investing considerable resources into its video development, the institute has more than 1.7 million subscribers on YouTube and has received more than 270 million views.

The institute's videos, webinars, and livestreams include khutbahs, interviews, Ramadan video series, exegetical analyses of the Quran, and brief explanations. The videos regularly include guest academics and scholars. In the past, Yaqeen Institute has worked on various projects alongside the Stanford University School of Medicine, NYU, the Harvard University Divinity School, and other higher education institutions.

A prominent element of the organization's work includes 'combatting the Islamophobia network'. Yaqeen Institute has held in-person events across the United States and Canada since its inception, including its flagship annual event, the Yaqeen/MAS Academic Conference, held annual in Chicago in coordination with the Muslim American Society. In 2019, the institute's president, Omar Suleiman, delivered an invocation in the U.S. House of Representatives as a guest chaplain. The institute has published articles criticizing pro-LGBTQ activism, (though at the same time they push modernism and Muslim feminism) praising the removal of a Canadian poster depicting two Muslim lesbians kissing created for International Day Against Homophobia, Biphobia and Transphobia. One article stated that "Islam’s prohibition of homosexual acts is categorical", and that "Muslims must... establish and advocate for the Islamic paradigm of gender and sexuality over and against modern and postmodern perversions while also supporting those Muslims who acknowledge orthodox Islamic teachings, but who struggle with same-sex attractions and/or gender dysphoria."

After the Gaza War began, the institute published an array of resources covering Islam, Palestine, and international politics from a 'Qur'anic lens'. It has also published pieces on the persecution of Uyghurs and other groups in the past. In early 2024, the institute's Canada branch launched IMIRT, an app aimed at accelerating the reporting of Islamophobic incidents in the country. Yaqeen Institute also awards multiple $2,000 Malcolm X Vanguards of Justice scholarships annually.
