= Line Halvorsen =

Norwegian filmmaker (born 1969)

Line Halvorsen (born 1969) is a Norwegian film maker. She was educated at the University of Trondheim and in the documentary film department at Volda University College.

She has directed and edited more than 20 documentaries and travel films since 1997. Halvorsen lived in Bethlehem in the West Bank from 2002 until 2004. During that time she wrote, edited and directed the award-winning documentary A Stone's Throw Away (2003) about the lives of three young Palestinian children. In 2004, she moved to the United States where she made USA vs Al-Arian (2007) about the trial and imprisonment of Sami al-Arian. After a six-month trial in 2005, the jury found Al-Arian not guilty of raising funds for the Palestinian Islamic Jihad. In 2010 her documentary "Living Without Money" was released, portraying the life of the German woman Heidemarie Schwermer who has been living without money since 1996.

Her other film credits include:

- Orphan Voices (2002)
- Horsebacking Australia (2000)
- Behind the Scenes 71° North (2000)
