= The Only Game in Town (El-Erian book) =

2016 economics book by Mohamed A. El-Erian

The Only Game in Town: Central Banks, Instability, and Avoiding the Next Collapse
- First edition
- Authors: Mohamed A. El-Erian
- Language: English
- Genre: non-fiction
- Publisher: Random House
- Publication date: January 2016
- Publication place: United States
- Pages: 296
- ISBN: 9780812997620

The Only Game in Town: Central Banks, Instability, and Avoiding the Next Collapse is a 2016 economics book authored by Mohamed A. El-Erian.

== Summary ==
El-Erian argues that, forced to take on massive policy responsibilities with inevitably partial tools, central banks only managed to put a band-aid on the consequences of the Great Recession, and that a continued period of low-growth and financial repression is not sustainable for much longer. The global economy and markets are on what he calls a "T junction". The current path being our pursued – or what he labeled back in 2009 as the "new normal" – will likely end within the next three years; and to illustrate this, the book identifies the mounting tensions and inherent contradictions that are becoming more visible at the domestic, regional and global levels. But what comes thereafter is not as yet pre-destined. It depends on choices that are made by governments and other members of society.

One road out of the T junction involves even lower growth, periodic recessions and financial instability; and it is a road that will fuel even greater political dysfunction, a worsening of what he calls the inequality trifecta (that of income, wealth and opportunity), and social tensions. The other road is one that unleashes the considerable productive capacity of the global economy, which is then turbocharged by the deployment of corporate cash sitting on the sidelines and exciting innovations. El-Erian then identifies the key drivers of each.

Reviewing how they have ended up as the only game in town policy-wise, El-Erian argues that, by necessity rather than choice, central banks have ended carrying too many responsibilities for policy decisions in recent years, and that politicians need to, and must, play a more active role in shaping policy.

Providing details, El-Erian suggests fixing the Great Recession for good will entail a four-pronged approach: fostering economic growth through structural reforms; encouraging greater balance in aggregate demand, including more inclusive access to consumption; implementing debt reduction in areas where crippling debt overhangs are destroying potential; and spearheading global coordination of economic policy. Some policy measures include "revamping the education system, strengthening infrastructure, improving labour competitiveness and flexibility, while simultaneously closing tax loopholes and increasing marginal tax rates on the wealthy in order to reduce inequality."

Given the "unusual uncertainty" associated with the T junction, the book also discusses the challenges facing sound decision making by governments, households and companies. Using the insights of behavioral science, he points to the most common mistakes that are made in such circumstances, and provides guidance on what can be done to address blind spots, unconscious biases and other inherent challenges.

== AIDAN ==
Financial Times
What better moment could there be for a book subtitled "Central Banks, Instability, and Avoiding the Next Collapse"? And who better to write it than Mohamed El-Erian— the man who captured the essence of the present era of low growth, low inflation and low investment returns better than anyone else with his memorable concept of the "new normal"? It is refreshing to read a policy book with the confidence to say that it is pointless to dispense elevator-pitch solutions to epochal economic challenges.

New York Times
El-Erian expertly offers a balanced view, commending the central banks for their necessarily aggressive policy views while noting, for example, the failure of the Fed to recognize the pre-crisis housing bubble. But title aside, this is hardly just a book about central banks. Instead, El-Erian offers a grand tour of the challenges we face, along with ideal solutions and more likely outcomes. He even dips into subjects of questionable relevance, like cognitive diversity and cultural bias.

Time Magazine
If you want to understand this bifurcated world and where it's headed, there is no better interpreter than Mohamed El-Erian. El-Erian is the former CEO of PIMCO, the world's largest bond trading firm, and now the chief strategist for insurance giant Allianz. His new book, "The Only Game in Town: Central Banks, Instability and Avoiding the Next Collapse” (Random House), is an excellent primer on how we got here and what to expect as the world struggles to cope with slower, less equal growth and the resulting populism, nationalism and ugly partisan politics that we see in countries from the U.S. to France to China.

The Economist
Mohamed El-Erian, a former IMF economist and executive at the Pimco fund management group, is the latest to sound the alarm. While central banks "averted tremendous human suffering", he argues that they have failed to generate what the Western world really needs—"the combination of high, durable and inclusive growth together with genuine financial stability". Worse still, politicians have come to rely on central bankers to provide the main source of economic stimulus. As a result, Mr El-Erian asserts, they have failed to force through reforms that were badly needed. The long period of easy monetary policy has pushed up asset prices and thus wealth inequality. It has also meant that the appetite for financial risks (market speculation, in other words) is greater than the willingness of businesses to take economic risks by increasing investment.

Publishers Weekly
It is suggested the main thesis of the book was "well-informed, if sometimes overstretched," but they criticized its forays into "trendy but less relevant territory with references to "cognitive diversity" and quotes from Sheryl Sandberg." However, they praised its "prescient warning against our current overreliance on central banks."
