= Sami Al-Arian =

Stateless political activist (born 1958)

- Born: January 14, 1958 (age 68); Kuwait
- Education: Southern Illinois University; North Carolina State University
- Occupation: Professor of computer engineering
- Employer: University of South Florida
- Spouse: Nahla Al-Najjar
- Children: 5, including Laila
- Parent(s): Amin, Laila

Sami Amin Al-Arian (Arabic: سامي أمين العريان; born January 14, 1958) is a Kuwaiti-born political activist of Palestinian origin who was a computer engineering professor at University of South Florida. During the Clinton administration and Bush administration, he was invited to the White House. He actively campaigned for the Bush presidential campaign in the United States presidential election in 2000.

After a contentious interview with Bill O'Reilly on The O'Reilly Factor following the September 11 attacks, Al-Arian's tenure at University of South Florida came under public scrutiny.

He was indicted in February 2003 on 17 counts under the Patriot Act. A jury acquitted him on 8 counts and deadlocked on the remaining 9 counts. He later struck a plea bargain and admitted to one of the remaining charges in exchange for being released and deported by April 2007. However, as his release date approached, a federal prosecutor in Virginia demanded he testify before a grand jury in a separate case, which he refused to do, claiming it would violate his plea deal. He was held under house arrest in Northern Virginia from 2008 until 2014 when federal prosecutors filed a motion to dismiss charges against him.

Al-Arian's activities and connections became a factor in multiple political campaigns, including the 2004 United States Senate election in Florida and the 2010 United States Senate election in California.

He was deported to Turkey on February 4, 2015.

== Early life and education ==
=== Kuwait and Egypt ===
Al-Arian was born on January 14, 1958, in Kuwait. His parents, Amin and Laila Al-Arian, were Palestinian refugees who left after the creation of Israel in 1948. After the 1948 Palestine war, Amin had to leave behind the family soap factory in Jaffa and flee towards the Gaza Strip's refugee camps. Amin's family migrated to Kuwait in 1957 where Sami Al-Arian was born. Under Kuwaiti law, his parents had legal resident status but he was not eligible for citizenship. In 1966, his family left Kuwait and went back to Egypt. He received his primary and secondary education at Cairo, Egypt. He left Egypt in 1975, and returned in 1979 for a visit when he married Nahla Al-Najjar.

=== United States ===
Sponsored by his father, Sami went to America for education. In 1975, Al-Arian came to the United States to study engineering at Southern Illinois University. In 1978, he graduated with a major in Electrical Sciences and Systems Engineering. At North Carolina State University, he earned his master's degree in 1980 and doctorate in 1985. He worked with Professor Dharma P. Agrawal on physical failures and fault models of CMOS circuits.

== Tenured at University of South Florida ==
He moved to Temple Terrace after he was hired as an assistant professor to teach computer engineering at University of South Florida (USF) on January 22, 1986. He was granted permanent resident status for United States in March 1989. He was promoted from an assistant professor to an associate professor with tenure. He received many accolades relating to teaching including the Jerome Krivanek Distinguished Teacher Award in 1993 and a salary raise based on merit grades via the Teaching Incentive Program in 1994.

== Activism ==
=== Community involvement and WISE ===
He was very involved in the local community. He served as an imam for a local mosque and as a charter officer for the local religious school. In 1992, he hosted a local cable-access show — Peace be upon you.

Al-Arian criticized the peace process led by Palestinian Authority president Yasser Arafat and advocated support for the Palestinian uprisings against Israeli occupation during the 1980s and early 1990s. On October 20, 1988, Al-Arian established the Islamic Concern Project, which included a committee devoted to raising charity for Palestine. In 1990–91, his continued involvement in promoting dialogue between the West and Middle East led to the creation of World and Islam Studies Enterprise (WISE), which served as a think tank that promoted public policy initiatives. WISE and University of South Florida formally agreed to cooperate on March 11, 1992. WISE published journals, supported graduate student education, and held seminars between American and Middle Eastern scholars.

=== Emerson film and investigation ===
Steve Emerson published a film in November 1994 that accused WISE as a terrorist front organization which Al-Arian vehemently denied. In May 1995, Michael Fechter of the Tampa Tribune expanded on Emerson's film. Sami Al-Arian's daughter, Laila Al-Arian, lambasted Emerson and the Tribune for publishing photographs of their home, school, and family car. In November 1995, federal agents investigating "violations of perjury and immigration laws" searched Sami Al-Arian's home for six hours to seize bank statements dating as far back as 1986, airline passes, telephone bills, AAA travel maps, family videotapes, audiotapes, and computer disks. A three-month independent inquiry was led by prominent Tampa lawyer and former USF President William Reece Smith that involved hundreds of documents and 59 interviews. The investigation reported in May 1996 that there was "no evidence" to support the allegation that Al-Arian or WISE supported terrorism. The report went on to conclude that University of South Florida officials acted appropriately in collaborating with WISE. The 99-page report was lauded by USF President Betty Castor for its "comprehensive, thoughtful, and detailed analysis". In June 1996, Florida universities Chancellor Charles Reed also said their investigation found no links between WISE and terror organizations.

In May 1996, Villanova University canceled a seminar that involved many speakers including Al-Arian after the Anti-Defamation League (ADL) complained about the possibility of riots. The Middle East Studies Association of North America (MESA), the United States's largest association of Middle East scholars, approved a resolution that rebuked ADL for "creating an atmosphere of intimidation that resulted in the cancellation of an academic event". USF placed Al-Arian on paid administrative leave in May 1996 pending the outcome of a federal investigation which had an indefinite time frame. Students complained in August 1997 after a graduation requirement course taught by Al-Arian was cancelled. After consultation with authorities who brought no charges after a three-year federal investigation, USF decided to reinstate him in August 1998.

=== Citizenship ===
He applied for U.S. citizenship in January 1994. Although he was informed that he passed all of the requirements to obtain citizenship in September 1994, he was neither granted nor denied citizenship. Federal law requires notification within 120 days after the citizenship examination. In October 1995, he filed suit for a judge to award him citizenship directly. His petition for citizenship was denied in March 1996 for allegedly unlawfully voting in a 1994 Hillsborough County local election.

=== Mazen Al-Najjar ===
Sami Al-Arian's brother-in-law Mazen Al-Najjar was jailed for nearly five years, accused of having links to Palestinian terrorists. In May 1997, Al-Najjar was incarcerated in Miami, Florida without charge and was held in jail indefinitely on the basis of secret evidence. Although Judge McHugh found Al-Najjar to be a respected member of a community, McHugh denied bail on the basis of secret evidence in May 1997. In May 2000, U.S. district judge John A. Leonard ordered a rehearing because Al-Najjar's right to due process had been violated when the government did not cede evidence in order for Al-Najjar to defend himself. During the first day of the rehearing in August 2000, the government called Al-Arian to testify. Several legal analysts and Al-Arian were convinced that Al-Arian, not Al-Najjar, was the focus of the Al-Najjar's court case. On the advice of his attorney, Al-Arian cited the 5th Amendment to 99 of 102 questions. Because Al-Najjar was a Palestinian born in Gaza during Egyptian control of the region, Al-Najjar essentially had no citizenship anywhere and the allegations that he was connected to terrorists had ruined attempts to find a country to take him, his wife, and three young daughters. Al-Najjar was released in December 2000 after a judge ruled the government had no evidence to continue holding him. (Note: Al-Najjar was again detained in November 2001 by Immigration and Naturalization Service (INS). He was held in detention officially for overstaying his student visa in the 1980s. His supporters accused the government of subverting civil liberties in the wake of the September 11 attacks. Al-Najjar was granted a two-week tourist visa by Bahrain. But en route to Ireland, Bahrain reversed its decision to accept Al-Najjar. After negotiations, Al-Najjar flew to Italy and then landed in Lebanon, which granted him a six-month visitor's visa beginning in August 2002.) He overstayed his US student visa, and was deported in August 2002.

=== Political involvement ===
Inspired by Al-Najjar's predicament, Al-Arian co-founded the Tampa Bay Coalition for Peace and Justice, which focused on the use of secret evidence and other civil rights issues in Antiterrorism and Effective Death Penalty Act of 1996 and Illegal Immigration Reform and Immigrant Responsibility Act of 1996. In 2000, Al-Arian co-founded and led the National Coalition to Protect Political Freedom. Newsweek named him as a "premier civil rights activist" for his efforts to repeal the use of secret evidence in trials.

Al-Arian visited the White House four times from 1997 to 2001.

During the 2000 presidential election, Al-Arian contacted Al Gore's campaign and Bush's campaign to address the use of secret evidence to detain U.S. citizens without charge. Al-Arian met Bush during a campaign stop at the Florida Strawberry Festival to demonstrate against the Clinton administration's use of secret evidence. After presidential debates in which Bush decried the use of secret evidence as a form of racial profiling against Arab-Americans, Al-Arian began campaigning for Bush as the candidate most likely to end discrimination. During the White House briefing that announced Bush as the winner of the election, Al-Arian received a spot in the front row for his voter outreach efforts in Florida. On June 20, 2001, Al-Arian joined 160 Muslim-American activists in a White House briefing with Bush senior adviser Karl Rove. But in a separate White House event on June 28, his son Abdullah – a congressional intern – made national headlines when he was escorted out by Secret Service without explanation. Twenty four Muslim community leaders walked out also to protest Abdullah's ejection. The Secret Service later apologized for the incident citing "confusion by one of its guards". President Bush personally apologized in a letter to Nahla and thanked the family for their charitable contributions to the Muslim communities around the world.

The Tampa Bay Muslim Alliance (TBMA) and Al-Arian had helped the resettlement of 50 families fleeing from the Bosnian War. Al-Arian and other leaders of TBMA condemned the September 11 attacks in the immediate aftermath. Al-Arian encouraged the nation to pursue those responsible but simultaneously discouraged acts of war that might impact innocent people. He discouraged radio talk show hosts from spreading hate-filled rhetoric and called for national unity. Al-Arian led the local Muslim community in organizing a blood drive in solidarity with the victims of September 11.

Al-Arian had opposed the War in Iraq and has spoken at a rally against the war. He has also been critical of neoconservatism and the Zionist movement.

=== Education ===
Al-Arian co-founded the Islamic Academy of Florida. After his criminal indictment, the school dissolved itself in 2004, with the new American Youth Academy using the former Islamic Academy buildings and equipment, with most of the students remaining.

== O'Reilly controversy ==
=== Television interview ===
On September 26, 2001, Al-Arian was invited to appear on The O'Reilly Factor to discuss Arab-American reactions to the 9/11 attacks. O'Reilly never addressed the reactions of Arab-Americans and confronted Al-Arian with a 1988 recording of him shouting "death to Israel".

O'REILLY: In – in 1988, you did a little speaking engagement in Cleveland, and you were quoted as saying, "Jihad is our path. Victory to Islam. Death to Israel. Revolution. Revolution until victory. Rolling to Jerusalem." Did you say that?
AL-ARIAN: Let me just put it into context. When president Bush talked about crusade, we understand what he meant here. The Muslim world thought he is going to carry a cross and go invade the Muslim world and turn them into Christians. We have to understand the context. When you say "Death to Israel", you mean death to occupation, death to apartheid, death to oppression, death to ... (sentence interrupted)

O'Reilly ended his interview by calling for the Central Intelligence Agency to shadow Al-Arian. USF spokesman Michael Reich said that "O'Reilly's comments were nothing but speculation." The O'Reilly interview caused Al-Arian to receive death threats from throughout the country.

=== Academic freedom ===
In October 2001, USF president Judy Genshaft placed Al-Arian on paid administrative leave and prohibited Al-Arian from entering USF property because she believed Al-Arian's presence would compromise campus security. During winter recess when students and faculty were on leave in December 2001, Genshaft and the USF Board of Trustees declared their intention to fire Al-Arian from teaching at USF because of academic disruption and problems for campus safety. The Faculty Senate President Gregory Paveza condemned the intention to fire as underhanded because the professors did not have their voices heard. The faculty adviser to the Board of Trustees resigned in protest of the firing. The Faculty Senate held an emergency meeting in January 2002 in which they approved by a wide majority a resolution that condemned the firing as an assault on academic freedom. United Faculty of Florida, the faculty union representing USF professors, voted to throw its full support behind Al-Arian and condemned the university for exaggerating security concerns.

CNN did an interview with Al-Arian in January 2002 in which Al-Arian accused the university of allowing those who make death threats to dictate the limits of academic freedom. Florida Governor Jeb Bush entered into the fray when he offered support for Genshaft's decision for Al-Arian's dismissal. An editorial from The New York Times criticized Bush and the university's handling of the case as an affront to freedom of speech. In late January, several student organizations at USF rallied on campus to protest Genshaft's firing of Al-Arian. At the Unitarian Universalist Fellowship in Lakeland in February 2002, Al-Arian discussed the history of the Israeli-Palestinian conflict and answered questions from the community regarding his USF quandary. Roy Weatherford, the President of the USF Faculty Union, lambasted the decision to fire Al-Arian in front of Genshaft in a faculty summit in March 2002. Following the summit, the American Association of University Professors (AAUP) revealed that it was conducting an investigation on Genshaft to determine if she had violated academic freedom. In late April 2002, AAUP investigators reported that Genshaft was wavering on her decision to fire Al-Arian, especially if the university was officially censured. AAUP investigators went on to conclude that Genshaft's decision to place Al-Arian on paid administrative leave rather than suspension reflected her lack of faith in legal advice that green-lighted Al-Arian's firing. USF denied the report and denied that AAUP's decision for censure would factor in Al-Arian's firing.

The largest national teachers' union, American Federation of Teachers, called on Genshaft in July 2002 to protect academic freedom by the reinstatement of Al-Arian. AAUP's investigating committee determined USF's premise for Al-Arian's removal was "insubstantial" and cited "grave issues of academic freedom and due process". Civil libertarians and professors nationwide condemned USF for willingly capitulating to post-9/11 hysteria. Former Central Intelligence Agency (CIA) agent Vincent Cannistraro publicly rebuked allegations against Al-Arian and testified in a civil disposition that Al-Arian had no ties to illegal organizations.

The investments of the Genshaft Family Foundation (GFF) in corporate bonds of the Industrial Development Bank of Israel came under scrutiny in September 2002. Several internet petitions also cited Genshaft's Jewish faith to raise support against Al-Arian. Genshaft denied knowing about the corporate bonds and said her decisions were neither affected by her investments nor her religion in the Al Arian case. John Esposito, a prominent scholar of Middle East, cancelled his USF speech in October 2002 to protest Genshaft's contraventions on academic freedom.

Because Genshaft feared the punitive lawsuits if she fired Al-Arian, Genshaft continued to pursue the Al-Arian's dismissal through an unusual step in which she asked Hillsborough Circuit Court to determine whether firing Al-Arian would violate Al-Arian's First Amendment rights. District Court judge Susan Bucklew dismissed Genshaft's case in December 2002. After Al-Arian filed a grievance contending that Genshaft broke the union contract by disciplining Al-Arian, Genshaft reversed course and affirmed Al-Arian was never disciplined. But a week after a federal indictment on Al-Arian, Genshaft fired him on February 27, 2003, by using the indictment as legal cover to protect the university from any ensuing lawsuit.

=== Loftus lawsuit ===
In March 2002, John Loftus compounded on O'Reilly's accusations by citing anonymous sources and filing a lawsuit that claimed Al-Arian used state-regulated organizations to launder money. Al-Arian's defense team derided the lawsuit as a publicity seeking stunt and suggested Loftus needed mental treatment. Loftus's lawsuit was summarily dismissed by the judge for failing to adequately show how Loftus was personally injured by Al-Arian's alleged activities.

== Indictment ==
=== Indictment ===
After one of the Justice Department's longest-running and most controversial terrorism investigations, federal prosecutors filed an indictment on February 21, 2003, which charged Al-Arian with racketeering for Palestine Islamic Jihad (PIJ). Al-Arian was indicted with co-defendants Ghassan Ballut, Hatim Fariz, and Sameeh Hammoudeh. Attorney General John Ashcroft hailed the vastly expanded powers of the Patriot Act as fundamental to the indictment. Arab American groups condemned the indictment as persecution for Al-Arian's advocacy of Palestinian causes. Local community activists, Iraq war protesters, and Muslim-Americans held demonstrations regularly on Al-Arian's affair in the weeks following the indictment. Al-Arian labeled his arrest a consequence of post-9/11 hysteria at a public pronouncement in front of a courthouse rally by his supporters.

In the wake of the indictment of Al-Arian, he became a major issue in the 2004 United States Senate election in Florida. Former USF president Castor, running for Senate, was attacked in the Democratic primary election by opponent Congressman Peter Deutsch and an allied 527 group and in the general election by opponent former HUD Secretary Mel Martinez for not denouncing or firing Al-Arian.

=== Trial ===
Al-Arian's five-month, 13-day trial began with frenzied attention from national media outlets. The prosecution's case was built largely on FBI wiretaps and fax transmissions gathered between 1994 and the time of Mr. Al-Arian's arrest in 2003. The surveillance included roughly 20,000 hours of dialogue from 472,000 wiretapped telephone conversations on 18 tapped lines gathered from 1994 to 2003. While such wiretaps taken by the intelligence arm of the FBI are usually kept secret from federal criminal investigators, provisions in the Patriot Act and the Foreign Intelligence Surveillance Act allow their use in certain trials dealing with terrorism. At the end of the prosecution's case, Al-Arian's lawyers chose not to present any witnesses in his defense and rested without offering a defense, hoping to leave the burden of proof squarely on the government's shoulders. The trial concluded in November 2005. After 13 days of deliberations, the jury acquitted Al-Arian in December on 8 of 17 counts and deadlocked on the remaining nine. Two co-defendants were acquitted of all charges and another co-defendant was also acquitted on majority of his charges. The verdict was seen as a major embarrassment to the government's prosecution and to the Patriot Act.

At trial, the prosecution accused Al-Arian of aiding Palestine Islamic Jihad (PIJ), which the Clinton administration issued an executive order declaring the PIJ a "specially designated terrorist" organization in 1995. The executive order barred "making or receiving contributions, funds, goods or services" to benefit the PIJ. Federal prosecutors also presented several transcripts of phone calls, but none involved any discussion of an attack against the U.S. or reflected advance knowledge of attacks in the Middle East.

In April 2005, the faculty union United Faculty of Florida passed resolutions to send a representative to Al-Arian's trial and to express support for Al-Arian's constitutional right to a fair trial with fair treatment of prisoners.

=== Plea agreement ===
On February 28, 2006, Al-Arian signed a plea agreement in which he agreed to plead guilty to one count of conspiracy to contribute services to or for the benefit of the PIJ, a Specially Designated Terrorist organization, in violation of 18 U.S.C. § 371. In return, the U.S. Attorney: a) agreed to dismiss the other eight remaining charges in the superseding indictment; b) agreed not to charge Al-Arian with any other crimes known to the government at the time of the execution of the agreement; c) agreed not to enter any recommendation as to the imposition or amount of a fine; d) agreed with Al-Arian that an appropriate sentence would be 46–57 months in prison; and e) covenanted that if no adverse information were received suggesting such a recommendation to be unwarranted, the U.S. would recommend that Al-Arian receive a sentence "at the low end of the applicable guideline range, as calculated by the Court". As part of the deal, Al-Arian agreed to be deported once his prison sentence ended. The plea agreement provided that it was "limited to the Office of the United States Attorney for the Middle District of Florida and the Counterterrorism Section of the Department of Justice, and cannot bind other federal, state, or local prosecuting authorities." It also provided that it "constitutes the entire agreement between the government and [Al-Arian] ... and no other promises, agreements, or representations exist or have been made to [Al-Arian]". The district court judge asked Al-Arian whether he had been promised anything else by anyone to induce his guilty plea, and he said that he had not. The plea agreement was unsealed and accepted by Judge James S. Moody on April 17, 2006. The count carried a maximum sentence of five years imprisonment, a $250,000 fine, and three years of supervised release. Al-Arian remained in custody pending his sentencing and deportation. The deal came after 11 years of Federal Bureau of Investigation investigations, wiretaps and searches, and three and a half years of trial preparation, time Al-Arian spent in jail, most of it in solitary confinement.

Supporters of Al-Arian said the agreement was reached in part to end his family's suffering and to reunite them.

=== Sentencing ===
Judge Moody sentenced al-Arian to the maximum 57 months in prison and three years of supervised release on May 1, 2006, and gave him credit for time served. Prosecutors said al-Arian would serve the balance of 19 months, and then be deported. In his ruling, Moody harshly criticized al-Arian. Al-Arian went on a 62-day hunger strike to protest the ruling.

Amnesty International demanded his immediate release and called for an investigation on his treatment in prison. It deemed his pre-trial detention conditions to be "gratuitously punitive" and "inconsistent with international standards for humane treatment". In a 2007 letter to Ashcroft, the human rights organization went on to declare that his "unacceptably harsh and punitive" abuse by prison guards was "based, at least in part, on his political background."

== Civil and criminal contempt prosecutions; 2006–present ==
Al-Arian was subpoenaed three times to testify in terrorism-related investigations before Virginia federal grand juries between 2006 and 2008. Each time, he refused to testify. He challenged the initial subpoena in four different federal courts, each of which held that he was in fact required to testify. He was imprisoned for 13 months for civil contempt for failing to testify in compliance with the first subpoena.

=== Grand jury subpoenas, refusal to testify, civil contempt, and hunger strikes ===
In May 2006, the U.S. District Court for the Eastern District of Virginia issued a subpoena to Al-Arian to testify before a federal grand jury in Alexandria, Virginia, in an investigation into the alleged financing of terror by the Herndon, Virginia-based International Institute of Islamic Thought (IIIT). The subpoena was served on Al-Arian in October 2006. He sought to quash it on the assertion that his plea agreement prevented his being forced to testify before the Virginia grand jury. He said the government had agreed that he would not be required to cooperate with it in any manner, though that specific agreement was not reflected in the written plea agreement. In a verbal agreement that he says appears in court transcripts, federal prosecutors agreed he would not have to testify in Virginia. Second, Al-Arian also said he refused to testify because he believed "his life would be in danger if he testified." Third, Al-Arian claimed he has no information that could further the investigation. Fourth, Al-Arian said he would not testify because he felt IIIT was inappropriately charged. When called before the grand jury on October 19, Al-Arian refused to answer questions about IIIT.

A Virginia District Court held that he had no legal basis to refuse to testify. The court held him in civil contempt, and imprisoned him on November 16, 2006, for contempt of court, with the days served for civil contempt not counting towards the days of imprisonment he had remaining on his guilty conspiracy plea. He appealed the Virginia District Court decision to the Fourth Circuit Court of Appeals, which affirmed the lower court's ruling. Thirteen months later, on December 14, 2007, the Virginia District Court lifted its contempt order, starting the clock ticking again on his days-served on his conspiracy guilty plea sentence. A Florida District Court also held that the plea agreement was not ambiguous, and did not prevent the government from issuing a subpoena requiring him to testify before a grand jury. Al-Arian, who is diabetic, began a 60-day hunger strike on January 22, 2007, to "protest continued government harassment." By March 20, 2007, the 6-foot-tall (1.8 m) Al-Arian had gone from 202 to 149 pounds (92 to 68 kg). Al-Arian appealed the Florida District Court decision to the Eleventh Circuit Court of Appeals, which upheld the lower court on January 25, 2008. It pointed out that the plea agreement did not contain any mention of whether Al-Arian would be compelled to testify in front of a grand jury in the future. It also noted that the agreement said it reflected all promises and agreements between Al-Arian and the government, and that this accorded with Al-Arian's statement, when questioned by the trial court judge, that there were no promises or inducements made to him other than those reflected in the written agreement. Furthermore, the court observed that the plea agreement only spoke to the issue of the government prosecuting Al-Arian for crimes known to the office at the time of the agreement, but did not immunize Al-Arian from future subpoenas. The court therefore held the plea agreement to be clear, unambiguous, and to not grant Al-Arian immunity from the grand jury subpoena. The Justice Department issued its third subpoena later that month.

In March 2008 he began another hunger strike, to protest his subpoena. He ended his hunger strike two months later. A 2011 NPR report claimed some of the people associated with this case were imprisoned in a highly restrictive Communication Management Unit.

=== Criminal contempt proceedings; house arrest; deportation ===
On June 26, 2008, he was indicted by a grand jury in the Eastern District of Virginia on two counts of criminal contempt, for unlawfully and willfully refusing court orders that he testify as a grand jury witness on October 16, 2007, and March 20, 2008. On September 2, 2008, he was released from custody and put under house arrest at his daughter Laila's residence in Northern Virginia, where he was monitored electronically while he awaited trial on criminal contempt charges.

At a January 2009 hearing to schedule his trial, his attorneys filed documents saying Al-Arian "did cooperate and answer questions on IIIT" for federal prosecutors. Attorneys alleged Virginia prosecutors are "ultimately not interested in IIIT ... but want to revisit the Tampa trial." In a motion filed on March 4, 2009, prosecutors in Virginia acknowledged that when Al-Arian took the plea deal in early 2006, prosecutors in Tampa believed that it exempted him from testifying in other cases. This affirms sworn declarations submitted to the court by Al-Arian's Florida trial attorneys, Bill Moffitt and Linda Moreno.

On March 9, 2010, Judge Leonie Brinkema postponed the criminal contempt trial, pending a motion by defense attorneys to dismiss the charges in the case. While under federal law, Al-Arian could not be jailed for more than 18 months for civil contempt, the law does not have a time limit for criminal contempt. On June 27, 2014, Assistant U.S. Attorney Gordon D. Kromberg moved to dismiss the indictment, but because the case has dragged on so long they decided to drop the case and begin proceedings to deport Al-Arian.

On February 4, 2015, Al-Arian was deported from the United States to Turkey. He was flown on a commercial flight from Dulles International Airport from Herndon, Virginia to Turkey. In a statement released by his former attorney, Jonathan Turley, Al-Arian said in part, "After 40 years, my time in the U.S. has come to an end." He added, "But despite the long and arduous ordeal and hardships suffered by my family, I leave with no bitterness or resentment in my heart whatsoever. In fact, I'm very grateful for the opportunities and experiences afforded to me and my family in this country, and for the friendships we've cultivated over the decades. These are lifelong connections that could never be affected by distance."

In 2017, Al-Arian founded the Center for Islam and Global Affairs (CIGA) at Istanbul Sabahattin Zaim University (IZU) in Istanbul, Turkey, which he directs.

In 2024, the New York Police Department and Mayor Eric Adams stated that Al-Arian posted on Twitter a photo of his wife at the 2024 Columbia University pro-Palestinian campus occupation. Adams cited the posting as evidence of non Columbia-affiliated individuals training and providing tactics to students to escalate their protests.

== Personal life ==
He is married to Nahla Al-Najjar, and they have five children. Nahla was born in 1960. His son Abdullah Al-Arian was an intern for U.S. Representative David E. Bonior in 2001. Al-Arian's eldest daughter, Laila Al-Arian, is a producer for Al Jazeera English in Washington, D.C., and a freelance journalist and contributor to the Huffington Post and The Nation.

=== Film ===
USA vs. Al-Arian is a 2007 documentary film by Norwegian director Line Halvorsen about Al-Arian and his family during and after his trial from his family's point of view, and a commentary on the U.S. justice system under the Patriot Act. The documentary was hosted by two MPs and screened in the Norwegian parliament.

== See also ==
- Sami Al-Arian indictments and trial
