= The Investigative Project on Terrorism =

American non-profit organization

- Project type: Research group
- Duration: 1995 – present
- Website: investigativeproject.org

The Investigative Project on Terrorism (IPT) is a non-profit research group founded by Steven Emerson in 1995. IPT has been called a prominent part of the "Islamophobia network" within the United States and a "leading source of anti-Muslim racism" and noted for its record of selective reporting and poor scholarship.

== History ==
IPT maintains a data center that includes archival information relating to the past activities of known Islamic terrorist groups. They also investigate suspected funding activities and networks of Islamic extremists in the US and abroad. IPT obtains information from a variety of sources, including "websites, list-serves, publications, informants, undercover recordings, government records, court documents, and so on". IPT has provided useful evidence to law enforcement and government agencies, and occasionally provides testimonial evidence during special committee hearings of the US Congress.

In April 2006, Emerson organized The Investigative Project on Terrorism Foundation as a nonprofit organization and serves as its executive director. In January 2007, the IRS granted the organization tax-exempt status. The organization's nonprofit status received a great deal of scrutiny from critics. According to an article published in the Tennessean by Bob Smietana, allegations of ties between the newly organized charity, and Emerson's for-profit company, SAE, were brought to the attention of the IRS. It was alleged that the foundation's tax-free dollars were being funneled to Emerson's production company in violation of the law. A spokesperson for Emerson's SAE Productions said the approach had already been vetted by the group's lawyers and declared legal, that it was set up that way for security reasons, and he further explained that Emerson does not take any profits from SAE Productions. No formal charges were made, or disciplinary actions taken against Emerson. The foundation maintained its nonprofit status.

== Indictments and trial evidence ==
According to an article in the Middle East Forum's Middle East Quarterly, "the IPT has access to information and intelligence to which the government is not privy, and has been instrumental in shutting down more than a dozen Islamic charitable terrorist and nonviolent front-groups since 2001."

In the 2007 and 2008 Holy Land Foundation Trials - prosecution relied on evidence produced by IPT, one of the three groups responsible for much of the analysis of exhibits and the links from Holy Land Foundation (HLF) to Hamas, the Muslim Brotherhood (MB), and the extended MB network. On May 27, 2009, in federal court in Dallas, "U.S. District Judge Jorge A. Solis sentenced the Holy Land Foundation for Relief and Development (HLF) and five of its leaders following their convictions by a federal jury in November 2008 on charges of providing material support to Hamas, a designated foreign terrorist organization." As a result of IPT's vast archives on the activities of Hamas front groups in the United States Law enforcement officials commented that IPT had an instrumental role in prosecuting and convicting the Holy Land Foundation, a trial that resulted in sweeping convictions for all defendants in 2008.

== Funding ==
The fund-raising arm of the Investigative Project on Terrorism is the Investigative Project on Terrorism Foundation, a 501(c)(3) tax-exempt organization established in 2006 by Steven Emerson. The Foundation is operated for the most part by SAE Productions, a Delaware-based company that was also founded by Emerson in 1994. According to an officer of SAE Productions, the arrangement avoids the need for the kind of public disclosure associated with tax-exemption and is necessary for security reasons: "The very nature of our work mandates that we protect the organization and its staff from threats posed by those that are the subject or our research by preserving the confidentiality of our methods."

An article by Bob Smietana in the Nashville Tennessean says that money is transferred from the non-profit foundation to the for-profit production company, SAE. In 2008, the non-profit paid US$$3,390,000 to SAE Productions for what was described as "management services", while Emerson was SAE's sole officer. IPT published a statement in response noting that, "At issue in the Tennessean story is the relationship between the IPT Foundation, a tax-exempt charity, and SAE Productions, a for-profit company run by IPT Executive Director Steven Emerson. The foundation accepts private donations and contracts with SAE to manage operations."

IPT has stated that it "accepts no funding from outside the United States, or from any governmental agency or political or religious institutions". In 2002 and 2003, Emerson received a total of $600,000 in grants from the Smith Richardson Foundation, a conservative-leaning policy research foundation. According to the Islamophobia project of the Center for American Progress, between 2009 and 2012, IPT received $1,409,585 of funding from conservative think tank the Middle East Forum.

== Reception ==
The liberal think-tank, Center for American Progress (CAP), stated that the IPT was one of ten foundations constituting what it called "the Islamophobia network in America." Robert Marinov and Daniel Stockemer also cited IPT as among the "Islamophobia networks," networks of organizations and their respective propaganda that "are among the 'main sources' generating anti-Islamic sentiments and rhetoric." Deepa Kumar described IPT as among the "leading sources of anti-Muslim racism" promoting the idea "that there is a conspiracy by Muslims to take over the United States" and asserted that Emerson founded IPT "to more consistently spew out conspiracy theories about the Islamic threat." Michael Loadenthal mentioned IPT as an "obvious example" of an organization "represent[ing] thinly veiled political motives typically infused with poor scholarship and extremely selective reporting," though he also acknowledged that IPT provided easy "access to court materials from terrorism trials." The organization has also been regarded as a part of the counter-jihad movement.

== Controversy ==
In December 2021, it was revealed that Romin Iqbal, at the time the leader of the Columbus chapter of the Council on American-Islamic Relations, was passing confidential information to the IPT, including voice recordings of private conversations. Iqbal was subsequently fired.
