= Omar Suleiman (imam) =

American imam, author and civil rights activist (born 1986)

Imam Omar Suleiman
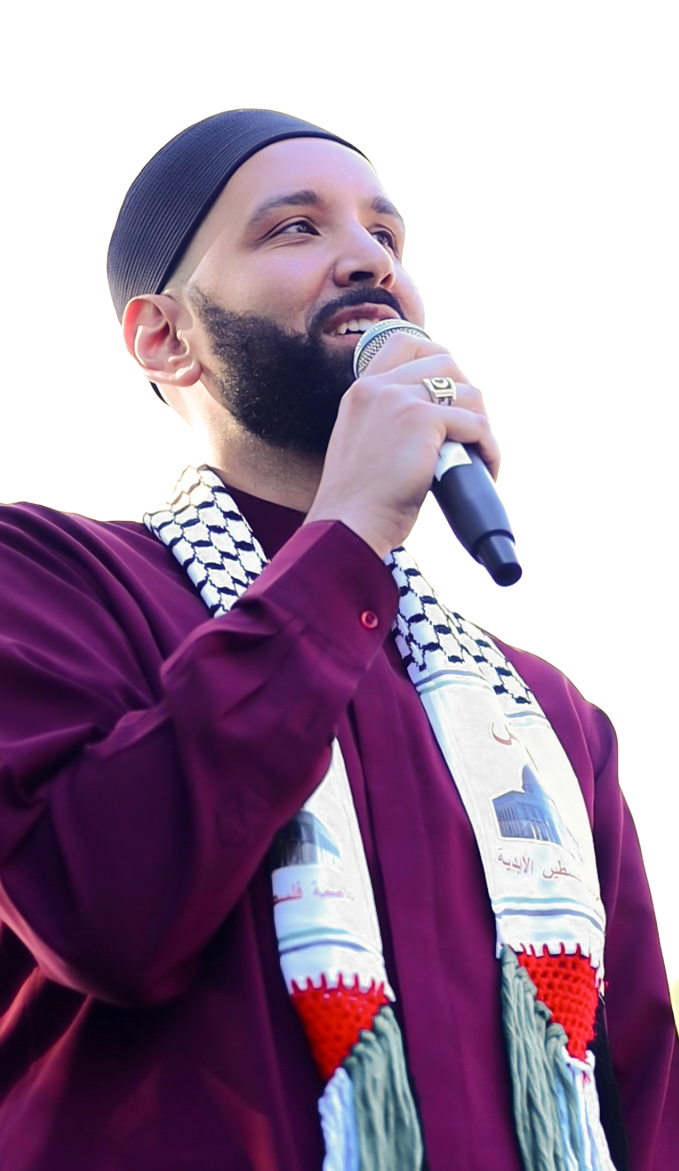
- Suleiman speaking at UNRWA USA's Gaza 5k fundraising event in Dallas, Texas, on September 28, 2024

Personal life
- Born: June 3, 1986 (age 40) New Orleans, Louisiana, United States
- Children: 3
- Education: International Islamic University Malaysia
- Occupation: Imam; author; civil rights activist
- Website: yaqeeninstitute.org

Religious life
- Religion: Islam
- Denomination: Sunni

Muslim leader
- Influenced by: Malcolm X; Martin Luther King Jr.

Omar Suleiman (born June 3, 1986) is an American imam, author and civil rights activist. He is the founder and president of the Yaqeen Institute and a member of the Ethics Center Advisory Board at Southern Methodist University.

Suleiman is also the Resident Scholar of the Valley Ranch Islamic Center and the Co-chair Emeritus of Faith Forward Dallas at Thanks-Giving Square.

== Early life and education ==
Suleiman was born on June 3, 1986, to a family of Palestinian Muslims in New Orleans. On his maternal side, he is a great-grandson of Muhammad Munib Hashem al-Ja'fari, a Hanafite scholar who had served as the final Mufti of Ottoman Nablus and traced his lineage back to Ja'far al-Tayyar, an older brother of Ali ibn Abi Talib.

Suleiman holds bachelor's degrees in accounting and Islamic law and Master's degrees in Islamic finance and political history. He completed doctoral studies in Islamic thought and civilization at the International Islamic University Malaysia.

== Career ==
Suleiman served as the imam of the Jefferson Muslim Association for six years, and as director of the "Muslims for Humanity" Hurricane Katrina relief effort in late 2005. He co-founded the East Jefferson Interfaith Clergy Association and received an award for outstanding civic achievement from the mayor and city council of New Orleans in 2010.

In 2016, Suleiman founded the Yaqeen Institute, a Muslim think tank. He is also the founding director of MUHSEN (Muslims Understanding and Helping Special Education Needs), a nonprofit umbrella organization that aims to create more inclusive Muslim communities that better cater to the disabled and their families.

He is a member of the Maguire Ethics Center Advisory Board at Southern Methodist University.

Suleiman completed his doctorate degree (PhD) in Islamic Thought and Civilization from the International Islamic University Malaysia in 2020.

He is Resident Scholar of the Valley Ranch Islamic Center and co-chair of Faith Forward Dallas at Thanks-Giving Square after September 2022.

== Activism ==
Suleiman has engaged in social justice organizing and activism on a host of progressive causes. He said that Donald Trump's presidency "fatigues" American citizens. He also "considers [himself] a student of Malcolm X" and believes that "his most important contribution to the revolution is his idea that the greatest casualty of the subjugation of African Americans was the loss of black consciousness." He has expressed that "America is a work in progress, and the most patriotic Americans are those that demand it live up to its promise." He also believes that "Muslim theology can be a source of liberation."

In July 2016, he marched with demonstrators in Dallas against the killings of Alton Sterling and Philando Castile. These demonstrations were eventually punctuated by a shooting in which five police officers were killed in retaliation for police shootings of African Americans. Suleiman recalls "an eternity of gunshots" ringing out just as the march came to a close. In the wake of the shooting, he was invited to lead the invocation at a memorial service for the slain officers attended by President Barack Obama and former first lady Michelle Obama, then-former Vice President Joe Biden and his wife Jill Biden, as well as George W. Bush and former first lady Laura Bush.

Since 2015, Suleiman has frequently visited Syrian refugee camps delivering aid with Muslim humanitarian relief group Helping Hand for Relief and Development.

Suleiman led airport demonstrations in Dallas in reaction to the Trump travel ban, which has since come to be known as the "Muslim ban" due to its restricting immigration from 7 predominantly Muslim-majority nations, as well as Trump's call for a temporary ban on Muslim entry into the U.S. following the 2015 San Bernardino attack, and again after the Orlando nightclub shooting. In a 2016 interview following the Orlando shooting, Suleiman denounced homophobia, stating: "If you believe that homosexuality is immoral, that’s fine, but you do not treat someone who’s gay as less than you because they don’t hold that belief." Despite this, Algemeiner Journal accused Suleiman of sexism and homophobia for past remarks, such as stating boys and girls could not hold platonic relationships and comparing homosexuality to bestiality.

In 2017, Suleiman was arrested on Capitol Hill protesting outside of the office of then-House Speaker Congressman Paul Ryan. He had been participating in a sit-in demonstration calling for comprehensive immigration reform. He later led a group of clergy to the U.S.–Mexico border to protest in solidarity with and meet migrants affected by Trump's family separation policy.

He has also worked to assist families of victims of police brutality, voiced support for the Black Lives Matter movement, and underscored the importance of anti-racism work more broadly.

Suleiman has advocated on behalf of Jamil Abdullah Al-Amin and members of the Holy Land Foundation, also known as "the HLF 5", such as Ghassan Elashi, whom Suleiman views as political prisoners.

In December 2021, Suleiman was the keynote speaker at the Russell Tribunal on War Crimes on Kashmir hosted in Sarajevo, Bosnia-Hercegovina.

=== 2017 ISIS assassination threat ===
In March 2017, ISIS published a propaganda film, Kill The Apostate Imams, that called for the assassination of Suleiman and a number of other prominent Islamic scholars based in the Western world. The film was a response to an earlier video Suleiman had produced with American pastor Andrew Stoker of the First United Methodist Church Dallas, An Imam, a Pastor and a Dream, that called for unity between Christians and Muslims in the U.S. and worldwide. In response to the threat, Suleiman said: "I believe that their venom needs to be condemned. They’ve hijacked my religion."

== Awards and recognition ==
Suleiman's work in the fields of community service, interfaith dialogue, and social justice led to his award for outstanding civic achievement from the mayor and city council of New Orleans in 2010.

He was featured as a "rising star" in Ozy Magazine and dubbed "The Religious Leader Dallas Needs" by D Magazine.

Suleiman was also the subject of a BBC documentary in 2016 highlighting the experience of Muslims in Texas facing rising Islamophobia, and a 2017 PBS documentary showcasing his work with Syrian refugees.

On May 9, 2019, Suleiman served as the congressional guest chaplain at the invitation of U.S. Representative Eddie Bernice Johnson and delivered the day's opening invocation.

In addition to being recognized by CNN as one of 25 Muslim American change-makers, Suleiman was also included in The Muslim 500, an annual ranking of the world's most influential Muslims compiled by The Royal Islamic Strategic Studies Centre in Amman, Jordan.

In observation of Frederick Douglass's bicentennial, the Antiracist Research and Policy Center at American University and Frederick Douglass Family Initiatives recognized Suleiman among 200 honorees whose work was deemed to best embody the legacy of Douglass's commitment to social change.

The Texas House of Representatives honored Suleiman in March 2022 for his role in assisting during the Colleyville synagogue hostage crisis. As congregants in a Sabbath service were being kept hostage by a lone gunman, Suleiman drove to the Congregation Beth Israel synagogue and volunteered to partake in hostage negotiations.

== Published works ==
- Prayers of the Pious, 2019. ISBN 978-1-84-774129-5
- Allah Loves..., 2020. ISBN 978-1-84-774135-6
- Repentance: Breaking Habits of Sin, 2020. ISBN 978-9-67-174029-3
- 40 on Justice: The Prophetic Voice on Social Reform, 2021. ISBN 978-1-84-774144-8
- Angels in Your Presence, 2021. ISBN 978-1-84-774150-9
- Meeting Muhammad, 2022. ISBN 978-1-84-774177-6
- Wings of Faith: Patience and Gratitude, 2022. ISBN 978-9-67-284419-8
