= American Youth Academy =

Islamic school in Florida, United States

Location
- 28°03′52″N 82°23′27″W

Information
- Established: 2004
- Grades: Infant–12th Grade
- Enrollment: c. 1200 (2023)
- Website: www.ayatampa.org

American Youth Academy is a Infant–12th Grade Islamic IB School in Tampa, Florida, United States, located in Temple Terrace (as of 2004).

== History ==
The school was established in 2004.

== Student body ==
In the mid-2000s the school had around 200 students. Students came from Hillsborough, Manatee, Pasco, Polk, and Sarasota counties. In many of those counties there were no Islamic schools, so Muslim parents in those counties enrolled their children in AYA. As of 2023, American Youth Academy has 1200 students.
