= Trials of Sami Al-Arian =

Sami Al-Arian indictments and trial began on February 20, 2003, the U.S. Department of Justice announced that Sami Al-Arian had been arrested as the alleged leader of the Palestine Islamic Jihad (PIJ) in the U.S., and Secretary of the PIJ's central worldwide governing group (the "Shura Council"). It also charged three others living in the U.S., as well as four outside the U.S. These included Al-Arian's long-time top USF/WISE associate Ramadan Abdullah Shallah, who had been designated a Specially Designated Terrorist by the U.S. in 1995, and was accused of being Secretary General of the PIJ.

The PIJ was identified as an international terrorist organization, with cells throughout the world, that supports jihad and martyrdom, responsible for the deaths of among other Americans Alisa Flatow (20 years old) and Shoshana Ben-Yishai (16 years old). In 1995 the PIJ, Syrian-based and largely financed by Iran, had been designated a "Specially Designated Terrorist" by the U.S., and in 1997 it had been designated a "foreign terrorist organization".

A 50-count indictment returned by a federal grand jury in Tampa charged the defendants under the Racketeer Influenced and Corrupt Organizations Act (RICO) with operating a racketeering enterprise from 1984 that engaged in violent activities, as well as: conspiracy within the U.S. to kill and maim persons abroad, conspiracy to provide material support and resources to PIJ, conspiracy to violate emergency economic sanctions, engaging in various acts of interstate extortion, perjury, obstruction of justice, and immigration fraud. The indictment alleged a ten-year conspiracy to support PIJ worldwide, help solve internal PIJ disputes and financial problems, help disseminate PIJ claims it was responsible for terrorist attacks in Israel, and raise funds within the U.S. for "violent jihad." It alleged numerous PIJ-associated terrorist acts, resulting in the murders of over 100 people in Israel and the Occupied Territories. It claimed that PIJ, ICP, and WISE operated together as an illegal enterprise. It also alleged that the defendants used USF, where some of them were teachers or students, as cover and as a means to bring other PIJ members into the U.S., purportedly for academic meetings and conferences.

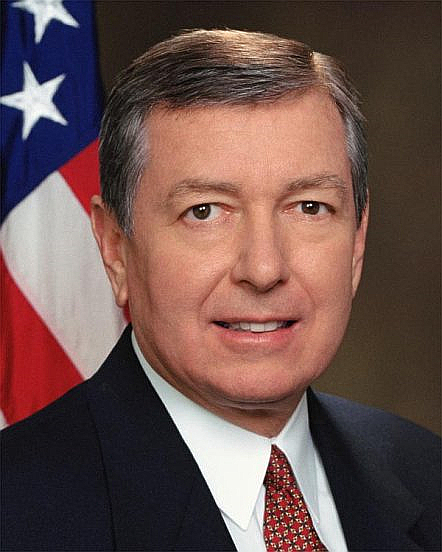
Attorney General John Ashcroft

Attorney General John Ashcroft said that Al-Arian and his co-defendants played:

a substantial role in international terrorism. They are 'material supporters' of foreign terrorist organizations. They finance ... and assist acts of terror. Our message to them is clear: We make no distinction between those who carry out terrorist attacks, and those who knowingly finance, manage, or supervise terrorist organizations.

Al-Arian told reporters: "it's all about politics", and his attorney labeled the indictment a "work of fiction."

The indictment was later expanded into a 53-count superseding indictment in September 2004. It charged Al-Arian with: 1) conspiracy to commit racketeering; 2) conspiracy to murder or maim persons outside the U.S.; 3) conspiracy to provide material support to a foreign terrorist organization (the PIJ); 4) conspiracy to make and receive contributions of funds, goods, and services for the benefit of Specially Designated Terrorists (the PIJ); 5) use of the mail or any facility in interstate or foreign commerce to promote unlawful activity; 6) providing material support to a foreign terrorist organization; 7) money laundering; 8) attempt to procure naturalization unlawfully; and 9) obstruction of justice.

== Trial ==
Al-Arian was tried with co-defendants Ghassan Ballut, Hatim Fariz, and Sameeh Hammoudeh in the United States District Court for the Middle District of Florida in Tampa, beginning on June 6, 2005. At trial, FBI agent Kerry Myers testified that the PIJ had planned an attack inside the U.S., but that all information about the plot was classified and he could not discuss it. Under cross-examination, Myers admitted that the PIJ had never carried out an attack outside Israel and the "occupied territories." Myers also testified that during its 10-year investigation of the defendants, the FBI intercepted 472,239 telephone calls on 18 tapped lines. However, none involved any discussion of an attack against the U.S. or reflected advance knowledge of attacks in the Middle East. Furthermore, some of the conversations occurred before PIJ was designated a Foreign Terrorist Organization in 1995.

The five-month trial featured 80 witnesses and 400 transcripts of intercepted phone conversations and faxes. At the end of the prosecution's case, Al-Arian's attorneys rested without offering a defense, and the trial concluded on November 14, 2005. On December 6, 2005, after 13 days of deliberations, the jury acquitted Al-Arian on 8 of 17 counts. It deadlocked on the 9 other counts, with 10-2 favoring acquittal. The jury deadlocked on what the prosecutors described as three of the most important four conspiracy charges against Al-Arian, including the charge of conspiracy to provide services to the PIJ. A co-defendant also was acquitted on some charges and faced deadlocks on others, and two co-defendants were acquitted of all charges. U.S. Justice Department officials said they were considering whether to retry Al-Arian and co-defendant Hatem Fariz on the jury deadlock charges, one of which carried a life sentence.

Jurors had mixed reactions. One who voted for acquittal said, "They have so little on [Al-Arian] that I'm disappointed. Most of us think he gave in because he was so sick of being in jail." But one of the jurors who believed Al-Arian was guilty on nine counts, causing a mistrial, said:

Like another person on the jury, I was convinced Mr. Al-Arian was still working with the PIJ after it was illegal. He was a very smart man and knew how not to be obvious. For me, the absence of evidence didn't mean there was no evidence. For me, it suggested a coverup, which he admitted to, in the plea agreement.

== Guilty plea, pursuant to plea agreement ==
On February 28, 2006, Al-Arian signed a plea agreement in which he agreed to plead guilty to one count of conspiracy to contribute services to or for the benefit of the PIJ, a Specially Designated Terrorist organization, in violation of 18 U.S.C. § 371. In return, the U.S. Attorney: a) agreed to dismiss the other eight remaining charges in the superseding indictment; b) agreed not to charge Al-Arian with any other crimes known to the government at the time of the execution of the agreement; c) agreed not to enter any recommendation as to the imposition or amount of a fine; d) agreed with Al-Arian that an appropriate sentence would be 46–57 months in prison; and e) covenanted that if no adverse information were received suggesting such a recommendation to be unwarranted, the U.S. would recommend that Al-Arian receive a sentence "at the low end of the applicable guideline range, as calculated by the Court".

In the agreement, Al-Arian said that he was pleading guilty because he was "in fact" guilty. Al-Arian admitted knowing "that the PIJ achieved its objectives by, among other means, acts of violence." As part of the deal, Al-Arian agreed to be deported once his prison sentence ended.

The plea agreement provided that it was "limited to the Office of the United States Attorney for the Middle District of Florida and the Counterterrorism Section of the Department of Justice, and cannot bind other federal, state, or local prosecuting authorities." It also provided that it "constitutes the entire agreement between the government and [Al-Arian] ... and no other promises, agreements, or representations exist or have been made to [Al-Arian]".

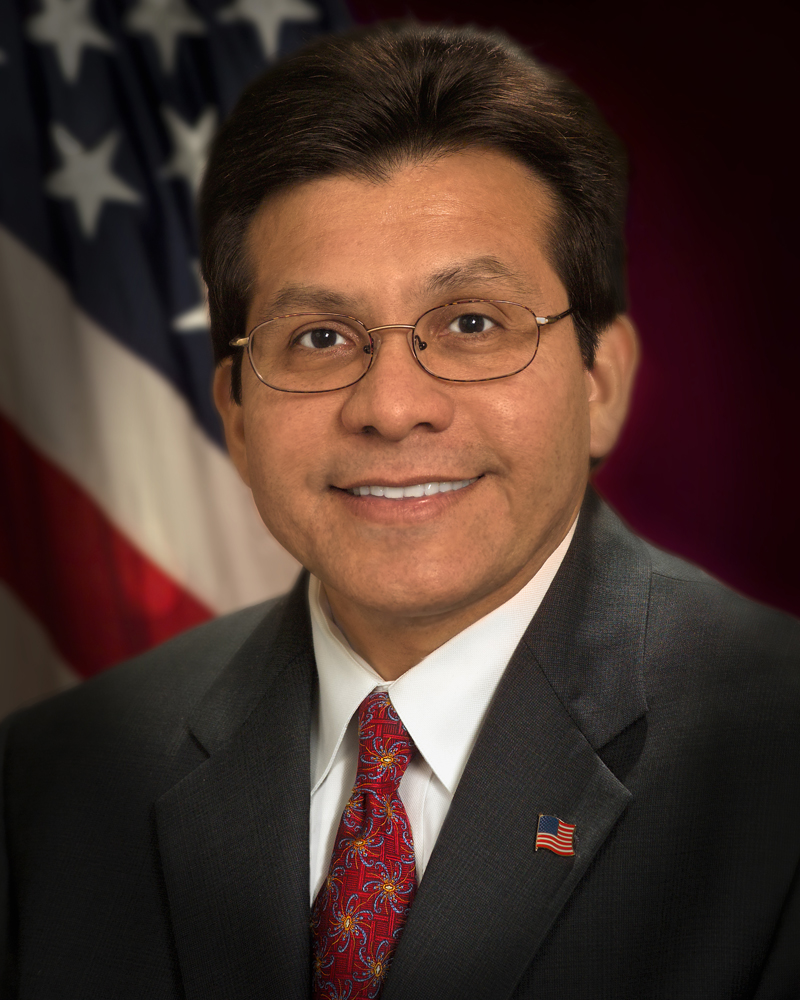
Attorney General Alberto Gonzales

Attorney General Alberto Gonzales said:

We have a responsibility not to allow our nation to become a safe haven for those who provide assistance to ... terrorists. Sami Al-Arian has already spent significant time behind bars, and will now lose the right to live in the country he calls home as a result of his confessed criminal conduct on behalf of the [PIJ], which is the same conduct he steadfastly denied in public statements over the past decade.

At the plea agreement hearing, U.S. Magistrate Thomas B. McCoun said, " if you're satisfied you're guilty or you believe it's in your best interest to plead guilty ... let me know that." Al-Arian replied, "I believe it's in my best interest to enter a plea."

The district court judge asked Al-Arian whether he had been promised anything else by anyone to induce his guilty plea, and he said that he had not. The plea agreement was unsealed and accepted by Judge James S. Moody on April 17, 2006. The count carried a maximum sentence of five years imprisonment, a $250,000 fine, and three years of supervised release. Al-Arian remained in custody pending his sentencing and deportation.

The deal came after 11 years of Federal Bureau of Investigation investigations, wiretaps and searches, and three and a half years of trial preparation, time Al-Arian spent in jail, most of it in solitary confinement. Amnesty International said Al-Arian's pre-trial detention conditions "appeared to be 'gratuitously punitive'", and that "the restrictions imposed on Dr. Al-Arian appeared to go beyond what were necessary on security grounds and were inconsistent with international standards for humane treatment.".

Supporters of Al-Arian said the agreement was reached in part to end his family's suffering and to reunite them.

On July 25, 2006, Fariz pleaded guilty to one count of providing nonviolent services to associates of Palestinian Islamic Jihad. He was sentenced to 37 months in prison. He was released on May 26, 2010.

== Sentencing ==
Judge Moody sentenced al-Arian to the maximum 57 months in prison and three years of supervised release on May 1, 2006, and gave him credit for time served. Prosecutors said al-Arian would serve the balance of 19 months, and then be deported.

In his ruling, Moody harshly criticized al-Arian for doing nothing to stop suicide bombings perpetrated by the PIJ. "I find it interesting that you praise this country in public," he said, "the one you called Great Satan." He continued:

You lifted not one finger. To the contrary, you laughed when you heard of the bombings ... You are a master manipulator. The evidence is clear in this case. You were a leader of the PIJ.

Describing the PIJ suicide bombings, the judge said: "Anyone with even the slightest bit of human compassion would be sickened. Not you, you saw it as an opportunity to solicit more money to carry out more bombings." Reacting to Al-Arian's contention that he had raised money for charities, Moody said: "Your only connection to widows and orphans was that you create them."

== Civil and criminal contempt prosecutions; 2006-2014 ==
Al-Arian was subpoenaed three times to testify in terrorism-related investigations before Virginia federal grand juries between 2006 and 2008. Each time, he refused to testify. He challenged the initial subpoena in four different federal courts, each of which held that he was in fact required to testify. He was imprisoned for 13 months for civil contempt for failing to testify in compliance with the first subpoena, later released on house arrest and eventually placed on daytime GPS monitoring. On June 27, 2014, all charges were dropped regarding his refusal to testify in grand jury proceedings. Per his 2006 plea agreement he was deported to Turkey on February 5, 2015.

=== Grand jury subpoenas, refusal to testify, civil contempt, and hunger strikes ===
Subpoena

In May 2006, the U.S. District Court for the Eastern District of Virginia issued a subpoena to Al-Arian to testify before a federal grand jury in Alexandria, Virginia, in an investigation into the alleged financing of terror by the Herndon, Virginia-based International Institute of Islamic Thought (IIIT). Homeland Security agent David Kane described alleged ties between Al-Arian and IIIT in an affidavit that was unsealed in 2003, saying that IIIT was once the largest contributor to a PIJ group run by Al-Arian. Kane also alluded to a letter from a leader of IIIT to Al-Arian saying he considered him and leaders of the Palestinian resistance to be "a part of us and an extension of us."

Refusal to testify

The subpoena was served on Al-Arian in October 2006. He sought to quash it on the assertion that his plea agreement prevented his being forced to testify before the Virginia grand jury. He said the government had agreed that he would not be required to cooperate with it in any manner, though that specific agreement was not reflected in the written plea agreement. In a verbal agreement that he says appears in court transcripts, federal prosecutors agreed he would not have to testify in Virginia.

Second, Al-Arian also said he refused to testify because he believed "his life would be in danger if he testified." Third, Al-Arian claimed he has no information that could further the investigation. Fourth, Al-Arian said he would not testify because he felt IIIT was inappropriately charged. Finally, another explanation for his not testifying was presented by his wife, who said:

My husband is a man of principle, and he will never turn into an informant. We admire him and are proud of him. In our culture, as Palestinians, if a person becomes an informant for the government, this is very shameful.

When called before the grand jury on October 19, Al-Arian refused to answer questions about IIIT.

Virginia District Court, civil contempt, and Fourth Circuit Court of Appeals

A Virginia District Court held that he had no legal basis to refuse to testify. The court held him in civil contempt, and imprisoned him on November 16, 2006, for contempt of court, with the days served for civil contempt not counting towards the days of imprisonment he had remaining on his guilty conspiracy plea. He appealed the Virginia District Court decision to the Fourth Circuit Court of Appeals, which affirmed the lower court's ruling. Thirteen months later, on December 14, 2007, the Virginia District Court lifted its contempt order, starting the clock ticking again on his days-served on his conspiracy guilty plea sentence.

Florida District Court; hunger strike

A Florida District Court also held that the plea agreement was not ambiguous, and did not prevent the government from issuing a subpoena requiring him to testify before a grand jury. Al-Arian, who is diabetic, began a 60-day hunger strike on January 22, 2007, to "protest continued government harassment." By March 20, 2007, the 6-foot-tall (1.8 m) Al-Arian had gone from 202 to 149 pounds (92 to 68 kg).

Eleventh Circuit Court of Appeals

Al-Arian appealed the Florida District Court decision to the Eleventh Circuit Court of Appeals, which upheld the lower court on January 25, 2008. It pointed out that the plea agreement did not contain any mention of whether Al-Arian would be compelled to testify in front of a grand jury in the future. It also noted that the agreement said it reflected all promises and agreements between Al-Arian and the government, and that this accorded with Al-Arian's statement, when questioned by the trial court judge, that there were no promises or inducements made to him other than those reflected in the written agreement. Furthermore, the court observed that the plea agreement only spoke to the issue of the government prosecuting Al-Arian for crimes known to the office at the time of the agreement, but did not immunize Al-Arian from future subpoenas. The court therefore held the plea agreement to be clear, unambiguous, and to not grant Al-Arian immunity from the grand jury subpoena. The Justice Department issued its third subpoena later that month.

Professor Robert Chesney, of Wake Forest University Law School, said:

It is certainly not uncommon for the government to expect a defendant to testify in the wake of a plea agreement. In this instance, the agreement is silent on the question, and the court of appeals agrees with the government that this leaves the door open to subpoena his testimony.

Hunger strike

In March 2008 he began another hunger strike, to protest his subpoena. He ended his hunger strike two months later.

=== Criminal contempt proceedings; house arrest ===
On June 26, 2008, he was indicted by a grand jury in the Eastern District of Virginia on two counts of criminal contempt, for unlawfully and willfully refusing court orders that he testify as a grand jury witness on October 16, 2007, and March 20, 2008. On September 2, 2008, he was released from custody and put under house arrest at his daughter Laila's residence in Northern Virginia, where he is being monitored electronically while he awaits trial on criminal contempt charges.

At a January 2009 hearing to schedule his trial, his attorneys filed documents saying Al-Arian "did cooperate and answer questions on IIIT" for federal prosecutors. Attorneys alleged Virginia prosecutors are "ultimately not interested in IIIT ... but want to revisit the Tampa trial." In a motion filed on March 4, 2009, prosecutors in Virginia acknowledged that when Al-Arian took the plea deal in early 2006, prosecutors in Tampa believed that it exempted him from testifying in other cases. This affirms sworn declarations submitted to the court by Al-Arian's Florida trial attorneys, Bill Moffitt and Linda Moreno.

On March 9, Judge Leonie Brinkema postponed the criminal contempt trial, pending a motion by defense attorneys to dismiss the charges in the case. While under federal law, Al-Arian could not be jailed for more than 18 months for civil contempt, the law does not have a time limit for criminal contempt.

== Rashad Hussain comments ==
Rashad Hussain's comments on Sami Al-Arian became the subject of coverage in the media after Rashad Hussain was appointed United States Special Envoy to the Organisation of the Islamic Conference in February 2010. The controversy concerned remarks made by Hussain in 2004, criticizing procedural issues in the U.S. terror prosecution of Sami Al-Arian. He "drew sharp criticism from conservatives for calling the prosecution of some terror suspects 'politically motivated,' a comment both Hussain and The White House denied." The Council on Foreign Relations stated that, "The controversy led to a larger question of whether the United States should engage the Organization of Islamic Conference diplomatically."

In 2004, while a student at Yale, Hussain attended a Muslim Students Association conference in Chicago and participated in a panel discussion on civil rights. Laila Al-Arian, a daughter of Sami Al-Arian, was also on the panel. During the discussion, Hussain made critical statements about the US terror prosecution of Sami Al-Arian and other terrorism suspects, such as Chaplain James Yee and Brandon Mayfield.[20] According to recordings obtained by Politico in 2010, Hussain referred to the cases as examples of "politically motivated prosecutions." [20] He was careful to say that he was not offering an opinion on whether Al-Arian was guilty of the charges that he was a top leader of the U.S. branch of the Palestinian Islamic Jihad, a "specially designated terrorist" organization.[20][21] In 2006, Al-Arian pleaded guilty to one charge of conspiracy to help the Palestinian Islamic Jihad, was sentenced to 57 months in prison, and agreed to be deported following his prison term.[21][22]

Opinions differ on whether the recording shows that Hussain using the term "prosecutions," or "persecutions," and whether he said that the prosecutions were "used to squash political dissent," quotations from a 2004 story that Hussain denied making.[23] After the controversy over the statements, Press Secretary Robert Gibbs expressed continued White House confidence in Hussain, noting, "This is an individual that has written extensively on why some have used religious devices like the Qur'an to justify this [terrorism] and why that is absolutely wrong. And has garnered support from both the left and the right so we obviously have confidence."

Originally, journalist Shannon Bream of Fox News reported that The White House attributed the "controversial remarks defending al-Arian" to Laila al-Arian. Later, Jake Tapper, the Senior White House Correspondent for ABC News, reported that the "controversy was all the more confusing because the remarks were reported in the WRMEA in 2004, but the editor, Delinda Hanley, later removed the comments from the Web site, though she didn't recall why. In an email to Politico, Delinda C. Hanley, editor of the WRMEA, wrote that "Laila Al-Arian said the things attributed to Rashad Hussain, and an intern who attended the event and wrote up the article made an error, which was corrected on our Web site by deleting the two quotes in their entirety."

Later, in the April 2010 edition of WRMEA, Hanley wrote:

Four or five years after the above item was published, this writer received a phone call or a phone message, I honestly can't remember, on a date I can't recall—we get so many calls I'm lucky if I can remember a conversation a week later!—saying Hussain had been misquoted in Kandil's article. I don't remember if it was a misquote or misattribution and, since Kandil had left the magazine years ago, I did not contact her. But I do remember asking our webmaster to remove the quote in question—because this sequence of events was unusual. Normally we publish a correction or objection as a letter to the editor (see, respectively, p. 6 of this issue and the letter from Daniel Pipes on p. 3 of our October 2001 issue). Years after the fact, however, that seemed pointless. Now that oversight has come back to haunt me—and, more importantly, hurt Obama's envoy pick.

In The Washington Post article titled Rashad Hussain, a Muslim and new U.S. envoy, is bridge between two worlds, Hussain is quoted as saying that his "extensive writings on this topic make it clear that I condemn terrorism unequivocally in all its forms. I'd be happy to put that against one sentence from 2004 that I believe was taken out of context." In his May 11, 2010 interview with Asharq Al-Awsat, Hussain was asked, "During your studies in law college in University of Yale you have criticize Sami Al-Aryan's trial and you have considered it represents a kind of politically motivated prosecution. Do you think that the courts in U.S. still suffer from identification of terrorism with the Muslims?" Hussain responded, "You know in that case that I said very clearly on the panel that I wasn't commenting on any of the specific allegations on him but I was making a comment about the process that was used in that case."
