= Abdullah El-Erian =

Egyptian jurist (1920–1981)

Abdullah el-Erian (March 21, 1920, in Damanhur — December 12, 1981, in Leiden) was an Egyptian international lawyer, diplomat, and judge. From 1959 to 1968 he headed the legal affairs and treaties department of the Ministry of Foreign Affairs of Egypt. He served as Permanent Representative of Egypt to the United Nations in Geneva from 1968 to 1979. He was a judge at the International Court of Justice (ICJ) from 1979 until his death in 1981. In 1967, he was elected member of the Institut de Droit International.

He died of a heart attack in 1981. He was succeeded at the ICJ by Mohammed Bedjaoui.
