= Ethan Bronner =

American journalist (born 1954)

Ethan Samuel Bronner
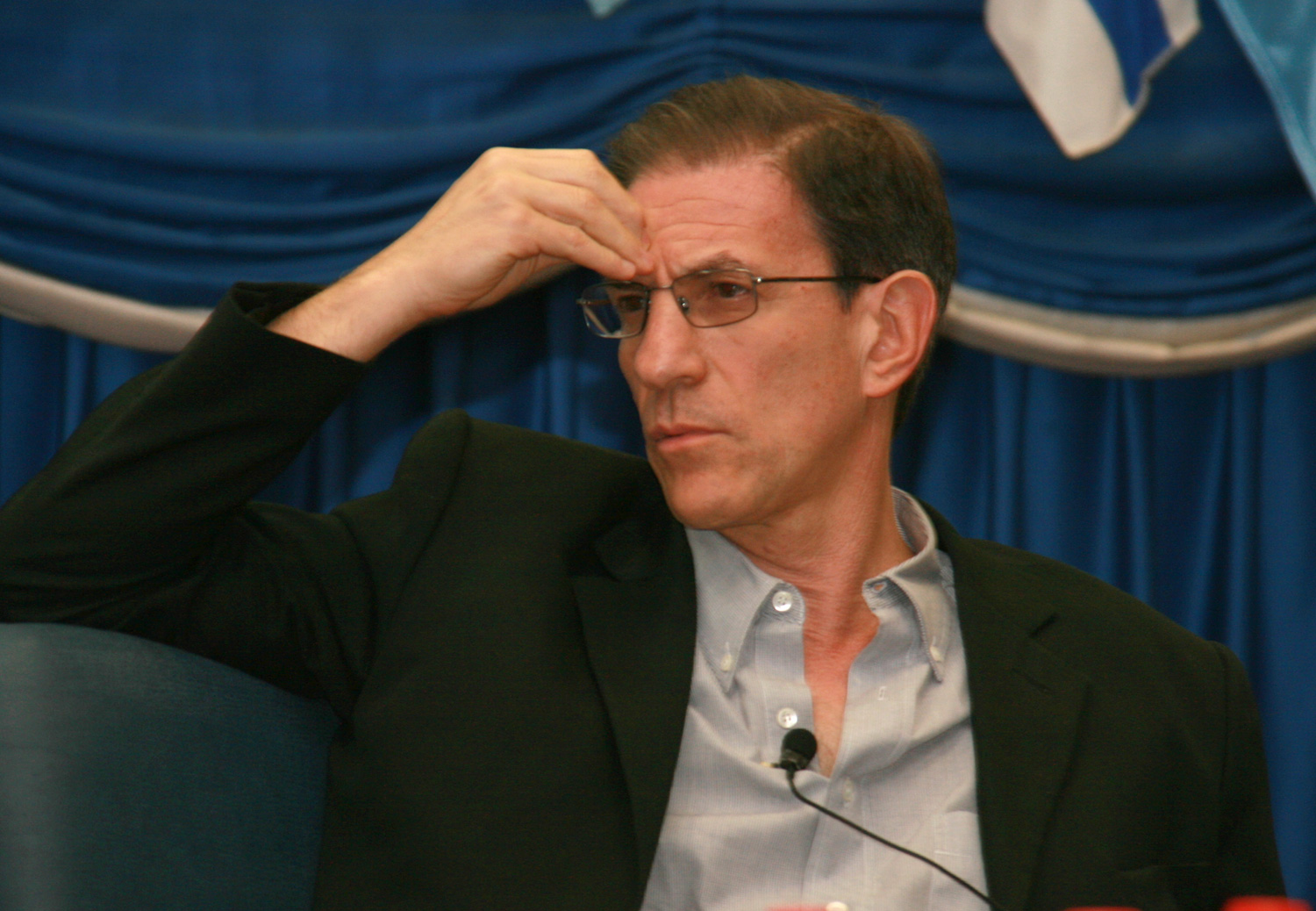
- Born: 1954 (age 71–72)
- Education: Wesleyan University Columbia University
- Occupations: Journalist, essayist, author
- Notable credit(s): The New York Times; The Boston Globe
- Spouse: Naomi Kehati
- Children: 2

Ethan Bronner (born 1954) is Israel bureau chief and a senior editor for the Middle East at Bloomberg News, which he joined in 2015 following 17 years at The New York Times.

== Biography ==
Bronner is a graduate of Wesleyan University's College of Letters and the Columbia University Graduate School of Journalism. He began his journalistic career at Reuters in 1980, reporting from London, Madrid, Brussels and Jerusalem. From 1985 until 1997, he worked for The Boston Globe. He started as a general assignment and urban affairs reporter. He went on to be the paper's Supreme Court and legal affairs correspondent in Washington, D.C. and then its Middle East correspondent, based in Jerusalem.

He then accepted a position with The New York Times, where he was the newspaper's national education correspondent from 1997 to 1999 and education editor from 1999 to 2001. In 2001, he transferred to the paper's investigative unit which focused on the September 11 attacks. A series of articles on al Qaeda that Bronner helped edit during that time was awarded the 2001 Pulitzer Prize for explanatory journalism. He then served as assistant editorial page editor and in 2004, he became its deputy foreign editor. From 2008 to 2012 he was The Times' Jerusalem bureau chief. He rotated out of Jerusalem in 2012 and spent a year as the NYT's national legal reporter, then became its deputy national editor. In 2015, he accepted a position as senior editor at Bloomberg News where he edits and writes investigative and analytic articles dealing mostly with international affairs. In March 2023, he became Israel bureau chief.

Bronner is the author of Battle for Justice: How the Bork Nomination Shook America (Norton, 1989), which was chosen by The New York Public Library as one of the 25 best books of 1989.

== Personal ==
Bronner and his wife Naomi Kehati, an Israeli-born psychologist, live in Tel Aviv. They have two sons, Eli and Gabriel. One of his sons served in the Israel Defense Forces.

== Bibliography ==
- Battle for Justice: How the Bork Nomination Shook America. New York: W.W. Norton & Co., 1989. ISBN 0-393-02690-6
