= Laila Al-Arian =

American broadcast journalist

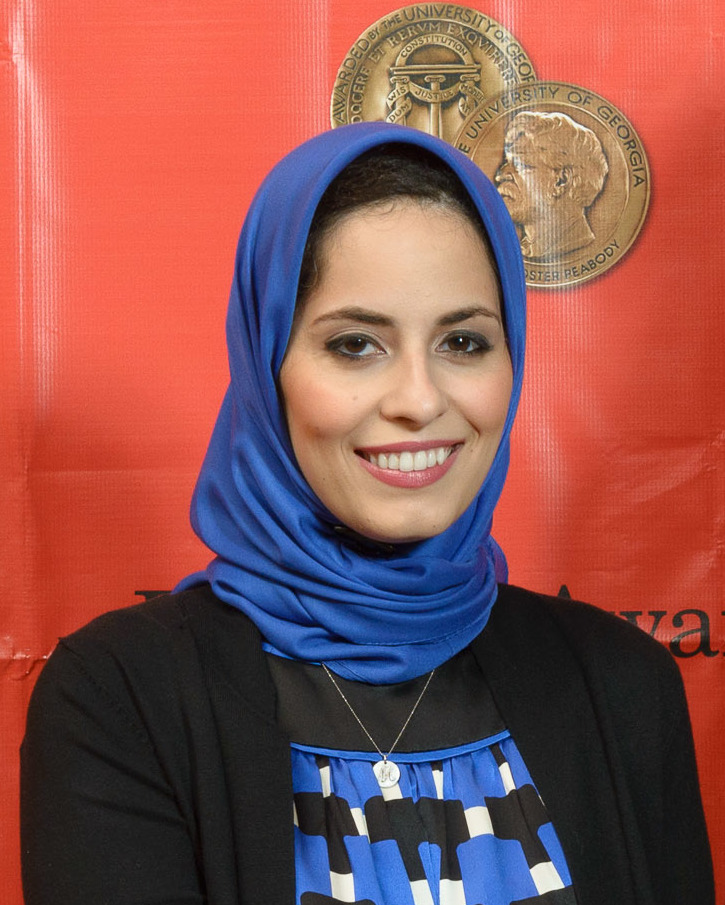
- Laila Al-Arian at the 73rd Annual Peabody Awards
- Education: Columbia University (MS); Georgetown University (BA)
- Occupations: Broadcast journalist, author

Laila Al-Arian is an American broadcast journalist for the Al Jazeera Media Network. She is the executive producer for the Al Jazeera English documentary series Fault Lines. She co-authored Collateral Damage: America's War Against Iraqi Civilians with Chris Hedges. She is married to American scholar of Islamic studies, Jonathan A. C. Brown.

She produced the Al Jazeera English special on the Palestine Papers in January 2011, a four-day program on the largest diplomatic leak in the history of the Israeli–Palestinian conflict. She raised national attention for an article in which she described Homeland as "TV's most Islamophobic show". She has produced several documentaries, including the Peabody-winning investigative report Made in Bangladesh. In 2013, she spoke at New America Foundation to discuss the history and impact of surveillance on targeted communities.

Since graduating from the Columbia School of Journalism in 2006, Laila Al-Arian's work has appeared in The Nation, The Independent, The Guardian, Huffington Post, Salon, and several other publications. She is the daughter of Sami Al-Arian. On October 1, 2018, Laila won an Emmy for her film, The Ban: The human cost of Trump's travel ban.

== Works ==
- Al-Arian, Laila (14 June 2012). "When your father is accused of terrorism". The Nation.
- Al-Arian, Laila (29 August 2012). "Exploring the roots of 'the abortion war'". HuffPost.
- Hedges, Chris; Al-Arian, Laila (10 July 2007). "The other war: Iraq vets bear witness". The Nation.
- Al-Arian, Laila (15 December 2012). "TV's most Islamophobic show". Salon. Archived from the original on 15 December 2012.
