= Radeh =

Radeh (Persian: خوران) may refer to:

- Radeh-ye Madan
- Radeh-ye Sadat
- Radeh-ye Seyhan
- Radeh-ye Taha
