= Seyyedhasan =

Seyyedhasan or Seyyed Hasan (Persian: سيدحسن) may refer to:

- Seyyed Hasan, Fars
- Seyyed Hasan, Ahvaz, Khuzestan Province
- Seyyed Hasan, Shushtar, Khuzestan Province
- Seyyed Hasan-e Hakim, Khuzestan Province
- Seyyedhasan, Lorestan
