= Tura =

Tura may refer to:

== Places ==
India

- Tura, Meghalaya, a municipality in India
- Tura (Lok Sabha constituency), a parliamentary constituency in Meghalaya State
- Roman Catholic Diocese of Tura, in Tura, Meghalaya

Russia

- Tura, Russia, several rural localities
- Tura Airport, a small airport in Krasnoyarsk Krai
- Tura (river), a tributary of the Tobol in the Ural Mountains and Siberia

Other

- Tura Beach, New South Wales, a community in Australia
- Tura, Egypt, a town in Cairo Governorate, Egypt
- Tura, Hungary, a city in Pest County, Hungary
- Tura, alternative name of Tarreh Bakhakh Pardis, a village in Khuzestan Province, Iran
- Turá, a village and municipality in Slovakia
- Tura, alternative name of Tengri as used by the Chuvash people

== Other ==
- Tura (name)
- Tura language
- Tura (isopod)

== See also ==
- Astictopterus tura, a butterfly
- Chimgi-Tura, a medieval city of the Siberian Tatars
- Mexichromis tura, a sea slug
- Nizhnyaya Tura, a town in Sverdlovsk Oblast, Russia
- Stará Turá, a town in Trenčín Region, Slovakia
- Tura al-Gharbiya, a Palestinian town
- Tura Magic F.C., a Namibian association football club
- Tura Satana (band), an American alternative metal band
- Verkhnyaya Tura, a town in Sverdlovsk Oblast, Russia
