= Tangeh (disambiguation) =

Tangeh is a village in Tehran Province, Iran.

Tangeh or Tongeh (Persian: تنگه) may also refer to:

- Tangeh 1, Khuzestan province
- Tangeh 2, Khuzestan province
- Tangeh 3, Khuzestan province
- Tangeh-ye Olya, Razavi Khorasan province
- Tangeh-ye Torkaman, North Khorasan province
