= Shalheh-ye Emam Hasan =

Shalheh-ye Emam Hasan شلهه امام حسن عسكرئ
- Village
- Location within Iran
- Coordinates: 30°13′16″N 48°24′08″E
- Country: Iran
- Province: Khuzestan
- County: Abadan
- Bakhsh: Central
- Rural District: Shalahi

Population (2006)
  - Total: 831
- Time zone: UTC+3:30 (IRST)
  - Summer (DST): UTC+4:30 (IRDT)

Shalheh-ye Emam Hasan (Persian: ) شلهه امام حسن عسكرئ, also Romanized as Shalḩeh-ye Emām Ḩasan) is a village in Shalahi Rural District, in the Central District of Abadan County, Khuzestan Province, Iran. At the 2006 census, its population was 831, in 148 families.
