= Mogheytiyeh =

Mogheytiyeh مغيطيه
- Village
- Location within Iran
- Coordinates: 30°17′34″N 48°23′11″E
- Country: Iran
- Province: Khuzestan
- County: Abadan
- Bakhsh: Central
- Rural District: Shalahi

Population (2006)
  - Total: 794
- Time zone: UTC+3:30 (IRST)
  - Summer (DST): UTC+4:30 (IRDT)

Mogheytiyeh (Persian: مغيطيه, also Romanized as Mogheytīyeh; also known as Faḥestān (Persian: فحستان), Mokhestān, Moqbetīyeh, Moqeyţīyali, Moqeyţīyeh, Moqeyţīyeh, Moqeytiyye, Moqītiyeh, Moxestan, Mughaiti, and Seyyed Ḩasan-e Hakīm) is a village in Shalahi Rural District, in the Central District of Abadan County, Khuzestan Province, Iran. At the 2006 census, its population was 794, in 142 families.
