= Seyyed Hoseyn =

Seyyed Hoseyn (سيدحسين) may refer to:

- Seyyed Hoseyn, Kazerun, Fars Province
- Seyyed Hoseyn, Rostam, Fars Province
- Seyyed Hoseyn, Khuzestan
- Seyyed Hoseyn, Ahvaz, Khuzestan Province
- Seyyed Hoseyn, Kurdistan
