= Malakeh =

Malakeh ملاكه
- Village
- Location within Iran
- Coordinates: 30°18′22″N 48°22′40″E
- Country: Iran
- Province: Khuzestan
- County: Abadan
- Bakhsh: Central
- Rural District: Bahmanshir-e Jonubi

Population (2006)
  - Total: 585
- Time zone: UTC+3:30 (IRST)
  - Summer (DST): UTC+4:30 (IRDT)

Malakeh (Persian: ملاكه, also Romanized as Malākeh; also known as Malācheh, Mallācheh, and Mulāchi) is a village in Bahmanshir-e Jonubi Rural District, in the Central District of Abadan County, Khuzestan Province, Iran. At the 2006 census, its population was 585, in 111 families.
