= IRIB Transmitting Station =

IRIB Transmitting Station فرستنده صداوسيما
- populated place
- Country: Iran
- Province: Khuzestan
- County: Abadan
- Bakhsh: Central
- Rural District: Bahmanshir-e Shomali

Population (2006)
  - Total: 17
- Time zone: UTC+3:30 (IRST)
  - Summer (DST): UTC+4:30 (IRDT)

IRIB Transmitting Station (Persian: فرستنده صداوسيما – Farstandeh-ye Şedā va Sīmā) is a populated place and transmitting station of Islamic Republic of Iran Broadcasting (IRIB), in Bahmanshir-e Shomali Rural District, in the Central District of Abadan County, Khuzestan Province, Iran. At the 2006 census, its population was 17, in 5 families.
