= Khezr =

Khezr (Persian: خضر) may refer to:

- Khezr, Fars
- Khezr, Khuzestan
- Khidr
