= Kher Khereh =

Kher Khereh خرخره
- Village
- Location within Iran
- Coordinates: 30°21′36″N 48°18′32″E
- Country: Iran
- Province: Khuzestan
- County: Abadan
- Bakhsh: Central
- Rural District: Bahmanshir-e Shomali

Population (2006)
  - Total: 570
- Time zone: UTC+3:30 (IRST)
  - Summer (DST): UTC+4:30 (IRDT)

Kher Khereh (Persian: خرخره, also Romanized as Kherkhereh; also known as Jazīreh Kher Khereh and Beyt-e Yāsīn) is a village in Bahmanshir-e Shomali Rural District, in the Central District of Abadan County, Khuzestan Province, Iran. As of the 2006 census, its population was 570, with 106 families.
