= Naqsheh-ye Hir =

Naqsheh-ye Hir نقشه حير
- Village
- Country: Iran
- Province: Khuzestan
- County: Abadan
- Bakhsh: Central
- Rural District: Shalahi

Population (2006)
  - Total: 483
- Time zone: UTC+3:30 (IRST)
  - Summer (DST): UTC+4:30 (IRDT)

Naqsheh-ye Hir (Persian: نقشه حير, also Romanized as Naqsheh-ye Ḩīr) is a village in Shalahi Rural District, in the Central District of Abadan County, Khuzestan Province, Iran. At the 2006 census, its population was 483, in 82 families.
