= Seyd Aviyeh =

Seyd Aviyeh صيداويه
- Village
- Location within Iran
- Coordinates: 30°14′28″N 48°27′37″E
- Country: Iran
- Province: Khuzestan
- County: Abadan
- Bakhsh: Central
- Rural District: Shalahi

Population (2006)
  - Total: 1,926
- Time zone: UTC+3:30 (IRST)
  - Summer (DST): UTC+4:30 (IRDT)

Seyd Aviyeh (Persian: صيداويه, also Romanized as Şeyd Āvīyeh) is a village in Shalahi Rural District, in the Central District of Abadan County, Khuzestan Province, Iran. At the 2006 census, its population was 1,926, in 386 families.
