= Dalgeh =

Dalgeh دلگه
- Village
- Location within Iran
- Coordinates: 30°17′05″N 48°25′33″E
- Country: Iran
- Province: Khuzestan
- County: Abadan
- Bakhsh: Central
- Rural District: Bahmanshir-e Jonubi

Population (2006)
  - Total: 270
- Time zone: UTC+3:30 (IRST)
  - Summer (DST): UTC+4:30 (IRDT)

Dalgeh (Persian: دلگه, also Romanized as Delgeh) is a village in Bahmanshir-e Jonubi Rural District, in the Central District of Abadan County, Khuzestan Province, Iran. At the 2006 census, its population was 270, comprising 45 families.
