= Shalheh-ye Hajji Hoseyn =

Shalheh-ye Hajji Hoseyn شلحه حاجي حسين
- Village
- Location within Iran
- Coordinates: 30°16′35″N 48°20′54″E
- Country: Iran
- Province: Khuzestan
- County: Abadan
- Bakhsh: Central
- Rural District: Shalahi

Population (2006)
  - Total: 797
- Time zone: UTC+3:30 (IRST)
  - Summer (DST): UTC+4:30 (IRDT)

Shalheh-ye Hajji Hoseyn (Persian: شلحه حاجي حسين, also Romanized as Shalḩeh-ye Ḩājjī Ḩoseyn and Shalheh Hājī Hoseyn; also known as Hājī Hoseyn, Ḩājjī Ḩoseyn, and Shalheh-ye Ḩājj Ḩoseyn) is a village in Shalahi Rural District, in the Central District of Abadan County, Khuzestan Province, Iran. At the 2006 census, its population was 797, in 149 families.
