= Darvishiyeh =

Darvishiyeh درويشيه
- Village
- Location within Iran
- Coordinates: 30°17′14″N 48°24′05″E
- Country: Iran
- Province: Khuzestan
- County: Abadan
- Bakhsh: Central
- Rural District: Shalahi

Population (2006)
  - Total: 206
- Time zone: UTC+3:30 (IRST)
  - Summer (DST): UTC+4:30 (IRDT)

Darvishiyeh (Persian: درويشيه, also Romanized as Darvīshīyeh) is a village in Shalahi Rural District, in the Central District of Abadan County, Khuzestan Province, Iran. At the 2006 census, its population was 206, in 35 families.
