= CAFA =

CAFA or Cafa may refer to:

== CAFA ==
- Caithness Amateur Football Association
- Canadian Airborne Forces Association
- Canadian Arts and Fashion Awards
- Central Academy of Fine Arts, China
- Central Asian Football Association
- Class Action Fairness Act of 2005, U.S.
- Committee for Academic Freedom in Africa
- Critical Assessment of Function Annotation an ongoing community-driven experiment designed to evaluate computational methods for protein function prediction
- Critics Adult Film Association, U.S.
- Republic of China Air Force Academy, a military academy in Taiwan

== Cafa ==
- Caffa, a 13th–15th-century Genoese colony
- Ćafa, Podgorica, Montenegro
- Melchiorre Cafà (1636–1667), Maltese Baroque sculptor

== See also ==
- Kafa (disambiguation)
- Gafa (disambiguation)
