= Tarreh Bakhakh Pardis =

Tarreh Bakhakh Pardis طره بخاخ پرديس
- Village
- Location within Iran
- Coordinates: 30°15′33″N 48°27′04″E
- Country: Iran
- Province: Khuzestan
- County: Abadan
- Bakhsh: Central
- Rural District: Shalahi

Population (2006)
  - Total: 2,326
- Time zone: UTC+3:30 (IRST)
  - Summer (DST): UTC+4:30 (IRDT)

Tarreh Bakhakh Pardis (Persian: طره بخاخ پرديس, also Romanized as Ţarreh Bakhākh Pardīs; also known as Pardīs, Parpīs, Tare baxâj, Tare-baxxâx, Ţareh, Ţareh Bakhāj, Ţareh Bakhkhākh, Tareh Nejākh, and Tura) is a village in Shalahi Rural District, in the Central District of Abadan County, Khuzestan Province, Iran. At the 2006 census, its population was 2,326, in 490 families.
