= Qafë =

Qafë may refer to:

- Qafë, Albania
- Qafë, North Macedonia
