= Qofas =

Qofas قفاس
- Village
- Location within Iran
- Coordinates: 30°07′21″N 48°34′53″E
- Country: Iran
- Province: Khuzestan
- County: Abadan
- Bakhsh: Central
- Rural District: Bahmanshir-e Jonubi

Population (2006)
  - Total: 34
- Time zone: UTC+3:30 (IRST)
  - Summer (DST): UTC+4:30 (IRDT)

Qofas (Persian: قفاس, also Romanized as Qofās and Qafās; also known as Absin, Gafāş, Gofās, Hāji Sālih, and Ḩājjī Şāleḩ) is a village in Bahmanshir-e Jonubi Rural District, in the Central District of Abadan County, Khuzestan Province, Iran. At the 2006 census, its population was 34, in 8 families.
