= Albuebadi =

Village in Khuzestan province, Iran

Albuebadi Persian: البوعبادي
- Village
- Location within Iran
- Coordinates: 30°19′40″N 48°21′06″E
- Country: Iran
- Province: Khuzestan
- County: Abadan
- District: Central
- Rural District: Bahmanshir-e Shomali

Population (2016)
  - Total: 941
- Time zone: UTC+3:30 (IRST)

Albuebadi (Persian: البوعبادي) (Note: Also romanized as Albū’ebādī; also known as Abu ‘Ebādī, Faraḩzād, Farrokhzād (فرخزاد), and Farroxzâd) is a village in, and the capital of, Bahmanshir-e Shomali Rural District of the Central District of Abadan County, Khuzestan province, Iran. The previous capital of the rural district was the village of Salih-ye Sharqi (سلیح شرقی).

== Demographics ==
=== Population ===
At the time of the 2006 National Census, the village's population was 830 in 143 households. The following census in 2011 counted 857 people in 224 households. The 2016 census measured the population of the village as 941 people in 256 households.
