= Radeh-ye Taha =

Radeh-ye Taha رده طاها
- Village
- Location within Iran
- Coordinates: 30°17′22″N 48°23′31″E
- Country: Iran
- Province: Khuzestan
- County: Abadan
- Bakhsh: Central
- Rural District: Shalahi

Population (2006)
  - Total: 445
- Time zone: UTC+3:30 (IRST)
  - Summer (DST): UTC+4:30 (IRDT)

Radeh-ye Taha (Persian: رده طاها, also Romanized as Radeh-ye Tāhā and Radeh-ye Ţāhā) is a village in Shalahi Rural District, in the Central District of Abadan County, Khuzestan Province, Iran. At the 2006 census, its population was 445, in 74 families.
