= Ramileh, Khuzestan =

Village in Khuzestan province, Iran

Ramileh Persian: رميله
- Village
- Location within Iran
- Coordinates: 30°17′17″N 48°20′38″E
- Country: Iran
- Province: Khuzestan
- County: Abadan
- District: Central
- Rural District: Shalahi

Population (2016)
  - Total: 2,986
- Time zone: UTC+3:30 (IRST)

Ramileh (Persian: رميله) (Note: Also romanized as Ramīleh and Romeyleh) is a village in Shalahi Rural District of the Central District of Abadan County, Khuzestan province, Iran.

== Demographics ==
=== Population ===
At the time of the 2006 National Census, the village's population was 2,043 in 368 households. The following census in 2011 counted 1,869 people in 508 households. The 2016 census measured the population of the village as 2,986 people in 832 households. It was the most populous village in its rural district.
