= Gafa =

Gafa or GAFA may refer to:

- Geometric and Functional Analysis (journal), a mathematical journal
- Guangzhou Academy of Fine Arts, a Chinese national university
- GAFA (Google, Amazon, Facebook, Apple), an abbreviation for four Big Tech companies

== Names ==
- Gafa, a diminutive of the Russian female first name Agafa
- Gafa, a diminutive of the Russian male first name Agafon
- Gafa, a diminutive of the Russian male first name Agafonik

== People ==
- Jordan Gafa (born 1990), American soccer player
- Lorenzo Gafà (1638–1703), Maltese architect, brother of Melchiorre
- Melchiorre Gafà or Melchiorre Cafà (1636–1667), Maltese sculptor, brother of Lorenzo
- Matt Gafa (born 1978), Australian rules footballer

== Places ==
- Great Australian Fuck-All, a colloquial term for the Outback of Australia

== See also ==
- Gafas, a village in Iran
- Cafa (disambiguation)
