= Fayyazi =

Fayyazi (Persian: فياضی) may refer to:

- Bita Fayyazi (b. 1962), Iranian artist
- Fayyazi, Iran, a village in Khuzestan Province, Iran

== See also ==
- Fayyad (disambiguation)
