= Tangeh-ye Seh =

Tangeh-ye Seh تنگه سه
- Village
- Location within Iran
- Coordinates: 30°11′20″N 48°30′10″E
- Country: Iran
- Province: Khuzestan
- County: Abadan
- Bakhsh: Central
- Rural District: Bahmanshir-e Jonubi

Population (2006)
  - Total: 1,137
- Time zone: UTC+3:30 (IRST)
  - Summer (DST): UTC+4:30 (IRDT)

Tangeh-ye Seh (Persian: تنگه سه) is a village in Bahmanshir-e Jonubi Rural District, in the Central District of Abadan County, Khuzestan Province, Iran. At the 2006 census, its population was 1,137, in 217 families.
