= Radeh-ye Seyhan =

Radeh-ye Seyhan رده سيحان
- Village
- Location within Iran
- Coordinates: 30°17′59″N 48°23′22″E
- Country: Iran
- Province: Khuzestan
- County: Abadan
- Bakhsh: Central
- Rural District: Bahmanshir-e Jonubi

Population (2006)
  - Total: 537
- Time zone: UTC+3:30 (IRST)
  - Summer (DST): UTC+4:30 (IRDT)

Radeh-ye Seyhan (Persian: رده سيحان, also Romanized as Radeh-ye Seyḩān; also known as Beyt-e Seyḩān, Radeh-ye Sobhān, Seyḩān, and Seyjān) is a village in Bahmanshir-e Jonubi Rural District, in the Central District of Abadan County, Khuzestan Province, Iran. At the 2006 census, its population was 537, in 92 families.
