= Savamar =

Village in Khuzestan province, Iran

Savamar Persian: ثوامر
- Village
- Location within Iran
- Coordinates: 30°15′43″N 48°21′41″E
- Country: Iran
- Province: Khuzestan
- County: Abadan
- District: Central
- Rural District: Shalahi

Population (2016)
  - Total: 1,432
- Time zone: UTC+3:30 (IRST)

Savamar (Persian: ثوامر) (Note: Also romanized as S̄avāmar and Savāmer) is a village in, and the capital of, Shalahi Rural District of the Central District of Abadan County, Khuzestan province, Iran.

== Demographics ==
=== Population ===
At the time of the 2006 National Census, the village's population was 1,283 in 243 households. The following census in 2011 counted 1,408 people in 367 households. The 2016 census measured the population of the village as 1,432 people in 398 households.
