= Chavibdeh =

City in Khuzestan province, Iran

Chavibdeh Persian: چويبده
- City
- Location within Iran
- Coordinates: 30°10′51″N 48°34′59″E
- Country: Iran
- Province: Khuzestan
- County: Abadan
- District: Central
- Established as a municipality: 2007

Population (2016)
  - Total: 7,906
- Time zone: UTC+3:30 (IRST)

Chavibdeh (Persian: چويبده) (Note: Also romanized as Chavībdeh, Chū'ībdeh, Chūybdeh, and Chwaibdeh; also known as Cavib-deh, Choo Abdeh, Chovīdeh, Chūbīdeh, Chū'ebdeh-ye Yek, Covideh, Javībdeh, Kuwaibdeh, and Kūyab Deh) is a city in the Central District of Abadan County, Khuzestan province, Iran.

== Demographics ==
=== Population ===
At the time of the 2006 National Census, Chavibdeh's population was 6,491 in 1,154 households, when it was a village in Shalahi Rural District. The following census in 2011 counted 7,252 people in 1,699 households, by which time the village had been elevated to the status of a city. The 2016 census measured the population of the city as 7,906 people in 2,100 households.
