= Tarreh-e Khezr =

Tarreh-e Khezr طره خضر
- Village
- Location within Iran
- Coordinates: 30°16′59″N 48°24′28″E
- Country: Iran
- Province: Khuzestan
- County: Abadan
- Bakhsh: Central
- Rural District: Shalahi

Population (2006)
  - Total: 571
- Time zone: UTC+3:30 (IRST)
  - Summer (DST): UTC+4:30 (IRDT)

Tarreh-e Khezr (Persian: طره خضر, also Romanized as Ţorreh-e Khezr and Tare Xezr; also known as Seyneh (Persian: سيهنه), Khezr, Samand) is a village in Shalahi Rural District, in the Central District of Abadan County, Khuzestan Province, Iran. At the 2006 census, its population was 571, in 104 families.
