= Abu Shanak =

Village in Khuzestan province, Iran

Abu Shanak Persian: ابوشانك
- Village
- Location within Iran
- Coordinates: 30°17′45″N 48°24′20″E
- Country: Iran
- Province: Khuzestan
- County: Abadan
- District: Central
- Rural District: Bahmanshir-e Jonubi

Population (2016)
  - Total: 1,173
- Time zone: UTC+3:30 (IRST)

Abu Shanak (Persian: ابوشانك) (Note: Also romanized as Abū Shānak and Abū Shānek; also known as Abowlshānak, Bashnak, Bū Shānek, Sânel, Shānek, Shānel, and Shanel) is a village in, and the capital of, Bahmanshir-e Jonubi Rural District of the Central District of Abadan County, Khuzestan province, Iran.

== Demographics ==
=== Population ===
At the time of the 2006 National Census, the village's population was 1,031 in 161 households. The 2011 census counted 652 people in 174 households. The 2016 census measured the village population as 1,173 people in 352 households.
