= Fiaz =

Fiaz (Persian: فیاض, Urdu: فیاض,) is both a surname and masculine given name. Fiaz is an alternative and less-common romanized spelling of the same name 'Fayyaz' (فیاض). Notable people with the surname include:

- Muhammad Fiaz, Canadian politician
- Rokhsana Fiaz (born 1971), British politician

== See also ==
- Faiz
