= Tangeh-ye Do =

Tangeh-ye Do تنگه دو
- Village
- Location within Iran
- Coordinates: 30°12′22″N 48°27′31″E
- Country: Iran
- Province: Khuzestan
- County: Abadan
- Bakhsh: Central
- Rural District: Bahmanshir-e Jonubi

Population (2006)
  - Total: 859
- Time zone: UTC+3:30 (IRST)
  - Summer (DST): UTC+4:30 (IRDT)

Tangeh-ye Do (Persian: تنگه دو) is a village in Bahmanshir-e Jonubi Rural District, in the Central District of Abadan County, Khuzestan Province, Iran. At the 2006 census, its population was 859, in 153 families.
