= Kafa =

Kafa or KAFA may refer to:

- Kafa, alternative spelling of Kaffa Province, Ethiopia
- Kafa, historical name of Feodosia, Crimea, Ukraine
- Ḱafa, a village in the municipality of Kičevo, North Macedonia
- Kafa language (or Kefa, Kafi noono), an Afroasiatic language spoken in Ethiopia
- KAFA-FM, the United States Air Force Academy radio station (97.7 FM)
- Korea Air Force Academy
- Korean Academy of Film Arts
- Korea American Football Association

== See also ==
- Cafa (disambiguation)
