= Radeh-ye Sadat =

Radeh-ye Sadat رده سادات
- Village
- Location within Iran
- Coordinates: 30°18′59″N 48°21′31″E
- Country: Iran
- Province: Khuzestan
- County: Abadan
- Bakhsh: Central
- Rural District: Bahmanshir-e Jonubi

Population (2006)
  - Total: 1,633
- Time zone: UTC+3:30 (IRST)
  - Summer (DST): UTC+4:30 (IRDT)

Radeh-ye Sadat (Persian: رده سادات, also Romanized as Radeh-ye Sādāt; also known as Sādāt) is a village in Bahmanshir-e Jonubi Rural District, in the Central District of Abadan County, Khuzestan Province, Iran. At the 2006 census, its population was 1,633, in 322 families.
