= Radeh-ye Madan =

Radeh-ye Madan رده مدن
- village
- Location within Iran
- Coordinates: 30°21′03″N 48°18′41″E
- Country: Iran
- Province: Khuzestan
- County: Abadan
- Bakhsh: Central
- Rural District: Bahmanshir-e Shomali

Population (2006)
  - Total: 694
- Time zone: UTC+3:30 (IRST)
  - Summer (DST): UTC+4:30 (IRDT)

Radeh-ye Madan (Persian: رده مدن, also known as Madan) is a village in Bahmanshir-e Shomali Rural District, in the Central District of Abadan County, Khuzestan Province, Iran. At the 2006 census, its population was 694, in 132 families.
