= American Muslims for Palestine =

American nonprofit organization

- Formation: 2006; 20 years ago
- Founder: Hatem Bazian
- Type: Nonprofit organization
- Headquarters: Palos Hills, Illinois
- National policy director: Osama Abu Irshaid
- Key people: Taher Herzallah and Kareem El-Hosseiny
- Website: www.ampalestine.org

The American Muslims for Palestine (AMP) is an American nonprofit organization founded in 2006.

AMP holds conferences and training sessions for coalition building and legislative advocacy, such as hosting annual Palestine Advocacy Days, that provide workshop panels and encourage attendees to meet with American Congress members. AMP works with Jewish Voice for Peace and IfNotNow to bolster Palestine solidarity campaigns.

== History ==
AMP was founded in 2006 by Palestinian-American UC Berkeley professor Hatem Bazian, who is also the co-founder of Students for Justice in Palestine. The organization opened its first office in 2009 in Palos Heights, Illinois.

== Policy positions ==
AMP supports the BDS movement's call for a boycott of Israel to put pressure on the country to comply with international law and human rights. The group hopes that a boycott will put an end to the Israeli occupation of the West Bank, grant full equality to Arab Israelis, and promote the right of return for the Palestinian refugees. AMP does not take a position on one-state solution or two-state solution as a resolution to the Israeli–Palestinian conflict.

== Campaigns ==
AMP co-signed a letter with Jewish Voice for Peace (JVP) in 2012 calling on the University of California system to protect student civil liberties from efforts to censor Palestine-related activism.

AMP has organized several billboard and bus advertisement campaigns in New York City and Washington, D.C. to end U.S. foreign aid to Israel. During the 2014 Gaza war, in which over 2,000 Palestinians were killed, it organized protests against Israel's conduct. In 2015, it ran a bus advertisement campaign in advance of Israeli Prime Minister Benjamin Netanyahu's speech to a joint session of Congress calling on members of Congress to boycott the speech.

In December 2016, AMP hosted an event endorsed by 15 other Syrian advocacy and relief organizations in support of the Syrian resistance at Aleppo in the Battle of Aleppo by encouraging attendees to lobby Congress. Later that month, AMP hosted a protest with Council on American–Islamic Relations and JVP calling on Illinois Governor Bruce Rauner to reverse the moratorium on resettling Syrian refugees.

In 2017, JVP, the U.S. Campaign for Palestinian Rights, the left-wing anti-war organization Code Pink, and AMP organized a letter campaign signed by 32 Democratic congresspeople urging United States Secretary of State Rex Tillerson to assist Palestinian protester Issa Amro, who was facing criminal charges in Israel.

During the 2017 crisis on the Temple Mount, AMP organized a protest called "Aqsa Under Attack" in front of the Israeli embassy in Washington, D.C. During the 2018 Gaza border protests, AMP's local chapter in New Jersey protested outside the offices of Senators Cory Booker and Bob Menendez, calling them to instigate an investigation on Israel using the Leahy Law.

During the 2021 Israel-Palestine conflict, AMP, along with other Muslim advocacy groups, called for a boycott of President Biden's Eid al-Fitr celebration at the White House due to his support of Israel during the conflict.

== Reactions ==
In 2013, the Anti-Defamation League (ADL) released a report in which it described AMP as one of the most "influential and active anti-Israel groups" The AMP has said that pro-Israel groups like the ADL deliberately use "false anti-Semitism charges" as a way to limit free speech, silence political activism, and intimidate vocal pro-Palestinian activists.

Middle East historian Asaf Romirowsky says that AMP "grew out of the network of Muslim Brotherhood organizations in America" and has an Islamist view of the Israeli–Palestinian conflict.

According to AMP director Kristin Szremski, the organization "typically ignores these smear campaigns because they're aimed, in part, to detract us from our work."

== Legal issues ==
A national board member of AMP was prevented from entering Israel as part of an interfaith delegation in 2017. In 2018, Israel officially barred members of AMP from entering Israel due to the organization's support of the BDS movement, which calls for a global boycott of Israel.

According to Jonathan Schanzer of the Foundation for Defense of Democracies, several of AMP's key personnel have previously worked for the Holy Land Foundation for Relief and Development, KindHearts for Charitable Humanitarian Development, or the Islamic Association of Palestine, all of which have had legal difficulties resulting from convictions of providing material support for terrorism to Hamas.

In 2017, AMP was sued by Stanley and Joyce Boim, claiming that the organization was "a mere continuation" of the Islamic Association of Palestine (IAP), and therefore liable for the damages associated with Boim vs Quranic Literacy institute (2004), in which the IAP was found civilly liable for the 1996 murder of 17-year old David Boim by Hamas militants. The case was dismissed in 2020 by the United States District Court, but the dismissal was "reversed and remanded" by the Seventh Circuit Court of Appeals in 2021. The trial is currently scheduled to commence on February 8, 2027.

In July 2024, a federal judge ruled that AMP must provide documents to the Attorney General of Virginia Jason Miyares regarding alleged fundraising violations.
