= Students for Justice in Palestine =

Pro-Palestinian student activist organization

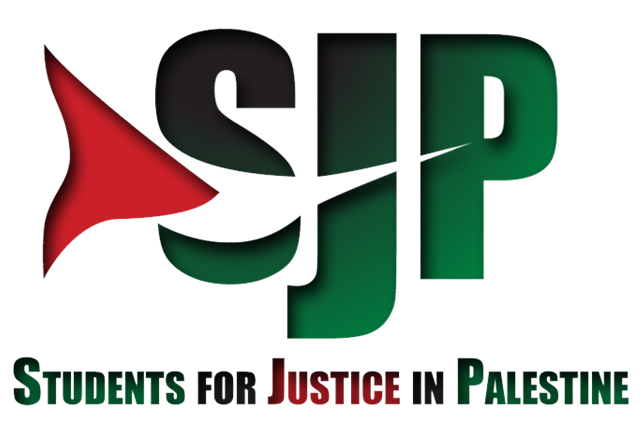
- Abbreviation: SJP
- Founded: 1993; 33 years ago
- Founder: Hatem Bazian
- Founded at: University of California, Berkeley
- Location: United States, Canada, New Zealand
- Affiliations: Palestine Solidarity Movement, Solidarity for Palestinian Human Rights
- Website: nationalsjp.org

Students for Justice in Palestine (SJP; Arabic: طلاب من أجل العدالة في فلسطين, romanized: Ṭullāb min ajl al-ʿAdāla fī Filasṭīn) is a pro-Palestinian college student activism organization in the United States, Canada, and New Zealand. Founded at the University of California, Berkeley in 1993, it has campaigned for the Boycott, Divestment, and Sanctions movement. The SJP praised Hamas's October 7 attacks on Israel as a "historic win for the Palestinian resistance". The group has faced accusations of antisemitism and some of its campus chapters have been suspended.

== Names ==
Some SJP chapters in the U.S. have adopted the name Palestine Solidarity Committee or Students for Palestinian Equal Rights. In Canada, some SJP chapters have adopted the name Solidarity for Palestinian Human Rights (SPHR). In Quebec, some use the name Solidarité pour les droits humains des Palestiniennes et Palestiniens (SDHPP), which means the same thing in French.

== History ==
Students for Justice in Palestine was founded at the University of California, Berkeley in 1993. It was cofounded by Hatem Bazian, now the chairman of American Muslims for Palestine. It held several events in spring 1993, and was officially recognized by the university in the fall. After the organization's status briefly lapsed in 1999, it was revived at the time of the Second Palestinian Intifada, which began in September 2000.

In 2002, the Berkeley chapter organized the first National Student Conference of the Palestine Solidarity Movement (PSM) to coordinate Palestine solidarity activism nationwide. Subsequent national conferences were held at the University of Michigan–Ann Arbor, Ohio State University, Duke University, and Georgetown University.

On 16 October 2011, the SJP held its first national conference at Columbia University. That same year, The New York Times called it "the leading pro-Palestinian voice on campus".

As of 2024, SJP reported having over 350 chapters in North America.

== Mission and organization ==
The SJP's mission statement is to develop "a connected, disciplined movement that is equipped with the tools necessary to contribute to the fight for Palestinian liberation", with an emphasis on intersectionality. SJP chapters agree to guard against "homophobia, sexism, racism, bigotry, classism, colonialism, and discrimination of any form".

The organization claims over 200 chapters nationwide, though this cannot be confirmed.

== Structure and funding ==
The National Students for Justice in Palestine is sponsored by the Westchester People's Action Committee (WESPAC) Foundation. WESPAC also sponsors Adalah NY, International Jewish Anti-Zionist Network, Palestinian Feminist Collective, Palestine Freedom Project, and Within Our Lifetime. WESPAC does not disclose information about its donors, which include organizations such as Elias Foundation and Tides Foundation. The Palestinian Solidarity Movement (PSM), the previous national hub organization, was sponsored by American Muslims for Palestine (AMP).

At a hearing of the House Ways and Means Committee, author Jonathan Schanzer criticized the SJP and AMP for the AMP's links to several now-defunct charities the U.S. government shut down for alleged indirect funding of Hamas, including the Holy Land Foundation.

== Protests ==
Students for Justice in Palestine became known for theatrical protests dramatizing Palestinian life for people on university campuses, including through protests recreating Israeli military checkpoints, detentions, and the West Bank separation wall, which they call an "Apartheid Wall".

Some SJP chapters encourage activists to cover their faces when protesting, and to avoid using their real names and photos on social media, to avoid doxing.

=== Occupation of academic building at UC Berkeley ===
In 2001, SJP's University of California, Berkeley chapter chose the memorial of the Deir Yassin massacre to occupy a campus building and disrupt a midterm exam in progress for over 600 students as part of a protest against the university's investments in Israel. Police broke up the occupation after warning the students of trespassing. Seventy-nine protesters were arrested for trespassing and resisting arrest. One protester was jailed on a charge of felony battery after he bit a police officer.

After the arrests, SJP was banned from operating at UC Berkeley, prompting an SJP protest by 200 demonstrators a month later. University Chancellor Robert M. Berdahl said, "It is important to understand that this is neither an issue of free speech, nor of the right to hold demonstrations on campus. The issue is the occupation of an academic building, interfering with the rights of other students to continue their education."

Students and faculty members at Berkeley said SJP's protests heightened polarization and were more "hostile" than other protests at Berkeley. One student remembers a demonstrator with a sign comparing the Star of David to the swastika. Students for Justice in Palestine picked up a nickname among critics, "Students for Just Us in Palestine."

=== Wheeler Hall sit-in ===
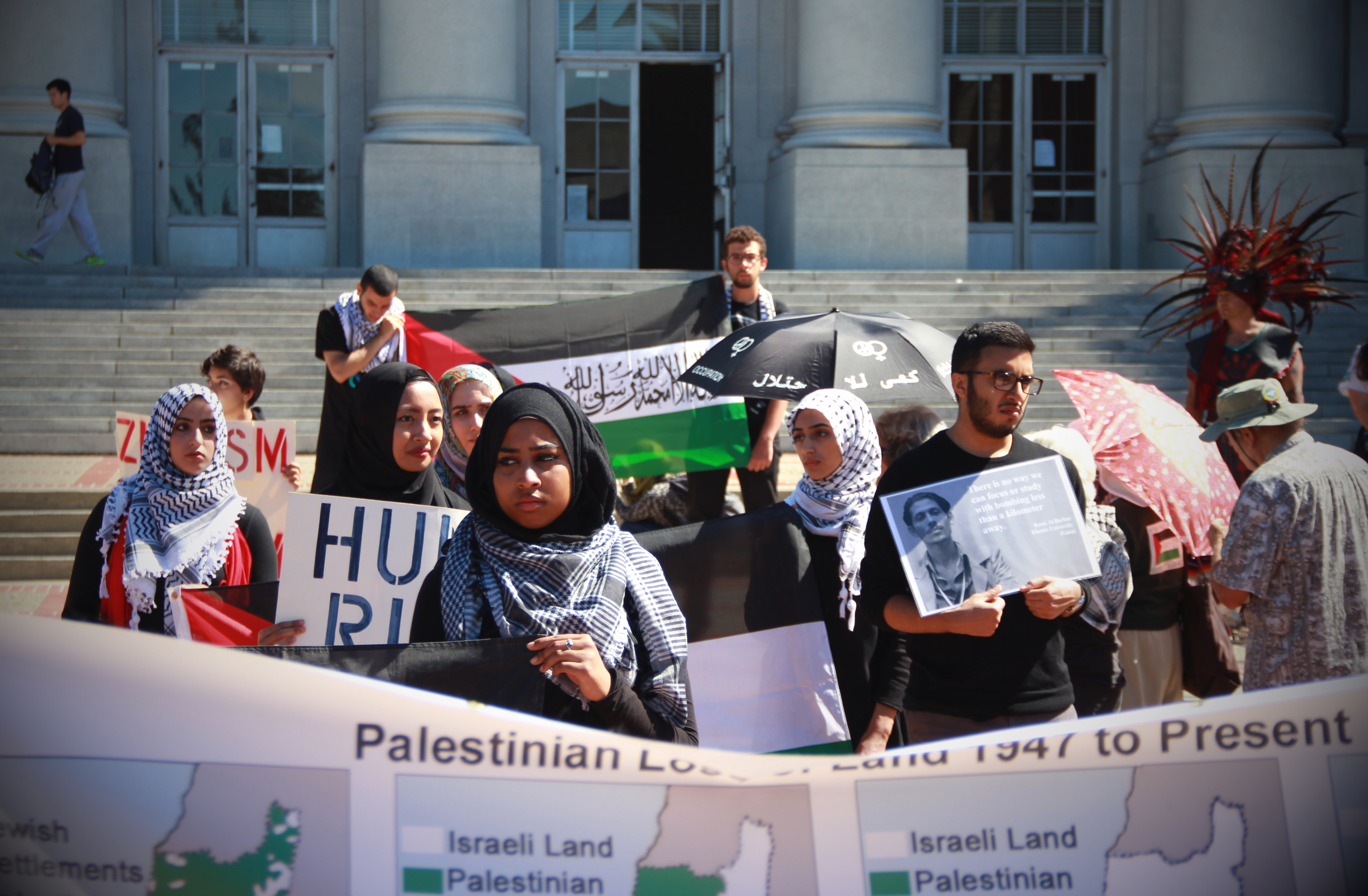
Protesters at a Students for Justice in Palestine rally in Berkeley, California, 2014

On April 9, 2002, SJP staged a sit-in at Wheeler Hall, one of the University of California, Berkeley's largest classroom buildings. Police were called to the scene, and the students were ordered to leave or face arrest. 41 students did not leave and were arrested and charged with various violations of the university's Code of Student Conduct. The university also banned SJP from engaging in on-campus protests.

=== New Zealand ===
In 2006, Auckland University's SJP led demonstrations against the local weapons industry Rakon, a company that sells components to the U.S. military. On 28 September 2015, members of the Victoria University of Wellington's SJP branch picketed a talk by two visiting former Israeli soldiers that had been organized by the Australasian Union of Jewish Students.

=== Brandeis University ===
In April 2011, while speaking at Brandeis University, Avi Dichter, a member of the Knesset and of Israel's centrist and Kadima party, was interrupted by protesters from the university's SJP calling him a war criminal and accusing him of torture and crimes against humanity.

=== Vassar College ===
Every year, the International Studies (IS) program at Vassar College offers a course that sends students abroad. In 2013, it was decided that the trip would be to Israel and Palestine to study water issues for a course called The Jordan River Watershed. The trip drew the ire of SJP for, among other things, being coordinated with the Israeli research institute Arava Institute for Environmental Studies. On February 6, nine SJP members picketed an IS class and handed out leaflets criticizing Israel.

=== Loyola University Chicago ===
On September 9, 2014, at Loyola University Chicago, students were manning a Hillel table promoting Birthright Israel, a program that subsidizes Jewish visits to Israel. A group of Palestinian students affiliated with SJP lined up at the table and tried to register for trips to Israel. After conversations with the students manning the table, they were turned away because they were not Jews. The Palestinian students then lined up for a photo op some distance away with signs that read: "My family is from the ethnically cleansed village of [each place name] BUT I DO NOT HAVE THE RIGHT TO RETURN."

The Hillel students complained and accused the Palestinian students of having harassed and verbally assaulted them "in an attempt to intimidate Jewish students." After two months of investigation, the university cleared SJP of those allegations, but found both Hillel and SJP responsible for having violated the university's Free Expression and Demonstration policy, Hillel for not having registered its table and SJP for not having registered its impromptu action, having learned about Hillel's tabling the night before.

As punishment, Hillel was required to attend an event on how to register events, while SJP was sanctioned with probation for the remainder of the school year, which prohibited it from requesting funds from the school for the duration. It was also required to attend "InterGroup Dialogue Training."

== Campaigns ==
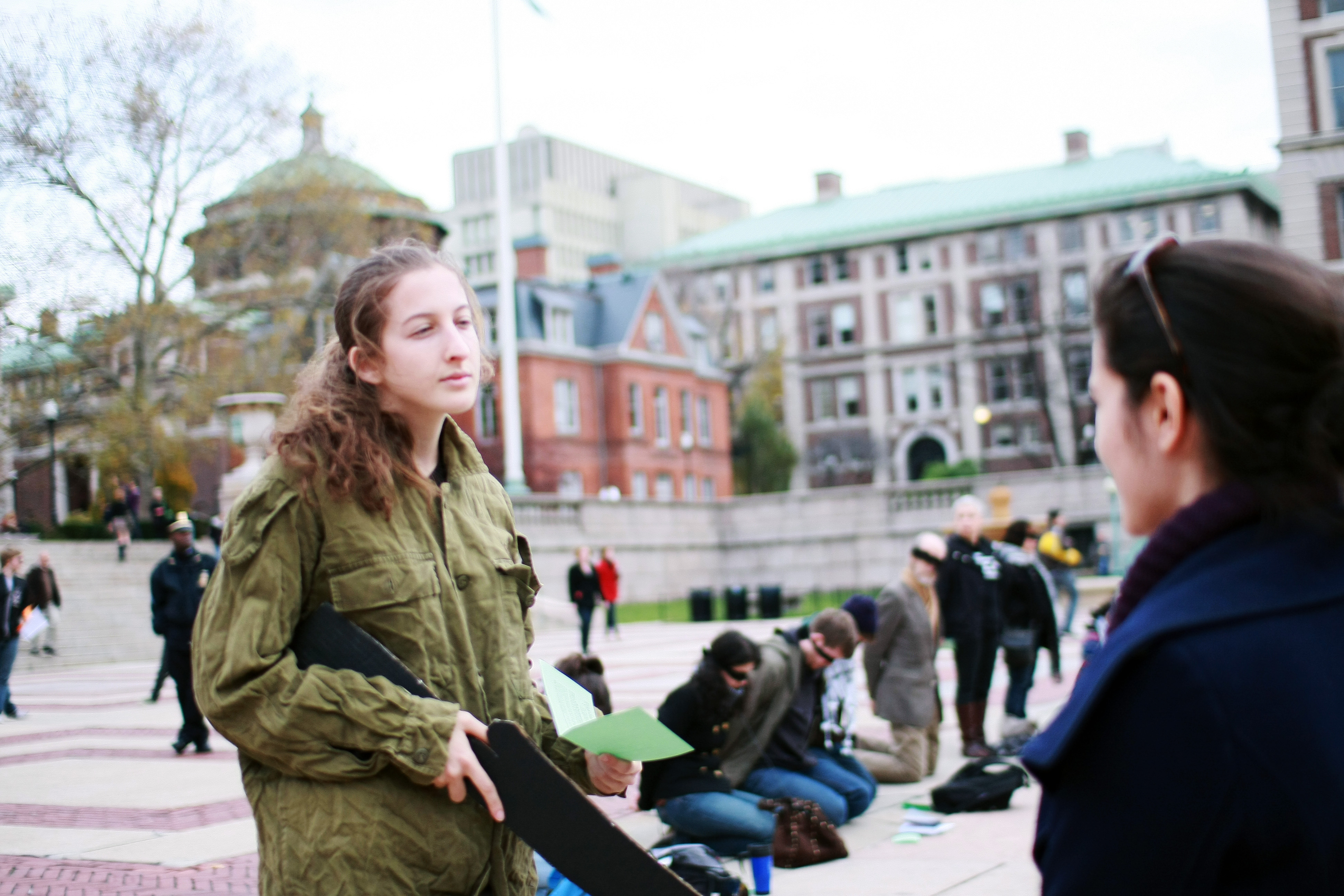
Columbia Students for Justice in Palestine organized a mock Israeli Checkpoint.

=== Bowdoin College ===
In May 2015, after a more than year-long campaign, the SJP boycott of Israel at Bowdoin College ended with 20% voting in favor, 21% abstaining, and 59% voting against.

=== Hampshire College ===
In February 2009, after a two-year campaign by SJP, signed by over 800 students, professors, and alumni, Hampshire College in Massachusetts became the first U.S. college to divest from companies involved in the Israeli occupation of Palestine. The board of trustees decided to divest from Caterpillar Inc., United Technologies, General Electric, ITT Corporation, Motorola, and Terex.

Hampshire College president Ralph Hexter said the decision to divest from those companies was not aimed at Israel but related to socially responsible investing criteria, and criticized SJP for suggesting otherwise. SJP representatives replied that the college was shying away from the "political implications of its action".

=== DePaul University ===
In November 2010, SJP at DePaul University began a campaign to have Sabra-brand hummus removed from the university. The parent company of Sabra is the Strauss Group, an Israeli food company. The university initially agreed, but reversed its stance a few days later and reinstated Sabra hummus in the dining halls. A university spokesperson said: "In this instance the sale of Sabra hummus was temporarily suspended, by mistake, prior to review by the Fair Business Practices Committee. We have reinstated sales to correct that error by staff personnel."

In May 2011, the DePaul SJP presented a referendum to the student government with regard to Sabra. The result was 1,127 in favor, 332 against, and 8 extraneous write-ins. The number of votes was 32 short of the 1,500 needed for the referendum to be valid.

=== Stanford University ===
Stanford University's Boycott, Divestment and Sanctions (BDS) group's defeat was notably followed by two quick BDS victories at University of California, Riverside (UCR), and University of California, San Diego. On March 8, 2013, substantial SJP campaigning at UCR culminated in a victory, with the school's senate voting 11–5 to endorse BDS and divest from Caterpillar and Hewlett-Packard. The vote in support of BDS at UCR was large enough to override a veto by the undergraduate student body president, who opposed the resolution.

=== Columbia University ===
In 2016, Columbia University's SJP and Jewish Voice for Peace chapters formed the Columbia University Apartheid Divest coalition. The organization's campaigns led to two student referendums: one held by the Barnard College Student Government Association in 2018 and one by the Columbia College Student Council in 2020. Students voted to divest from Israel in both votes, but Columbia University president Lee Bollinger declined to divest the university's holdings.

On October 25, 2023, following the October 7 attacks, hundreds of Columbia University affiliates, in coordination with SJP and other Palestinian advocacy groups, participated in a walkout protesting violence in Israel and Gaza, as well as the university's ties to Israel. The event, co-organized by Columbia's SJP and JVP chapters, called for a ceasefire, divestment from companies profiting from Israeli activities, and the cancellation of the Tel Aviv Global Center opening. The walkout did not receive university approval, and participants faced threats of doxxing. Counter-protesters supporting Israel were also present. In November, Columbia University suspended the group for violating campus event policies that require 10 days' notice for events. The suspension was effective until the end of the fall semester, and the group could not receive university funding or hold events on university grounds during this period. The campus event policy was updated to 12 days' notice before SJP held a walkout. Criticizing the changes, the executive committee of the Columbia chapter of the American Association of University Professors wrote the administration a letter saying that the change "flagrantly contravenes University rules and procedures" and calling on the administration to "commit to shared faculty governance, and to nullify improperly authorized committees, actions, and policies that circumvent channels of governance at the University and the core principle of free speech."

=== 2023 Gaza war ===
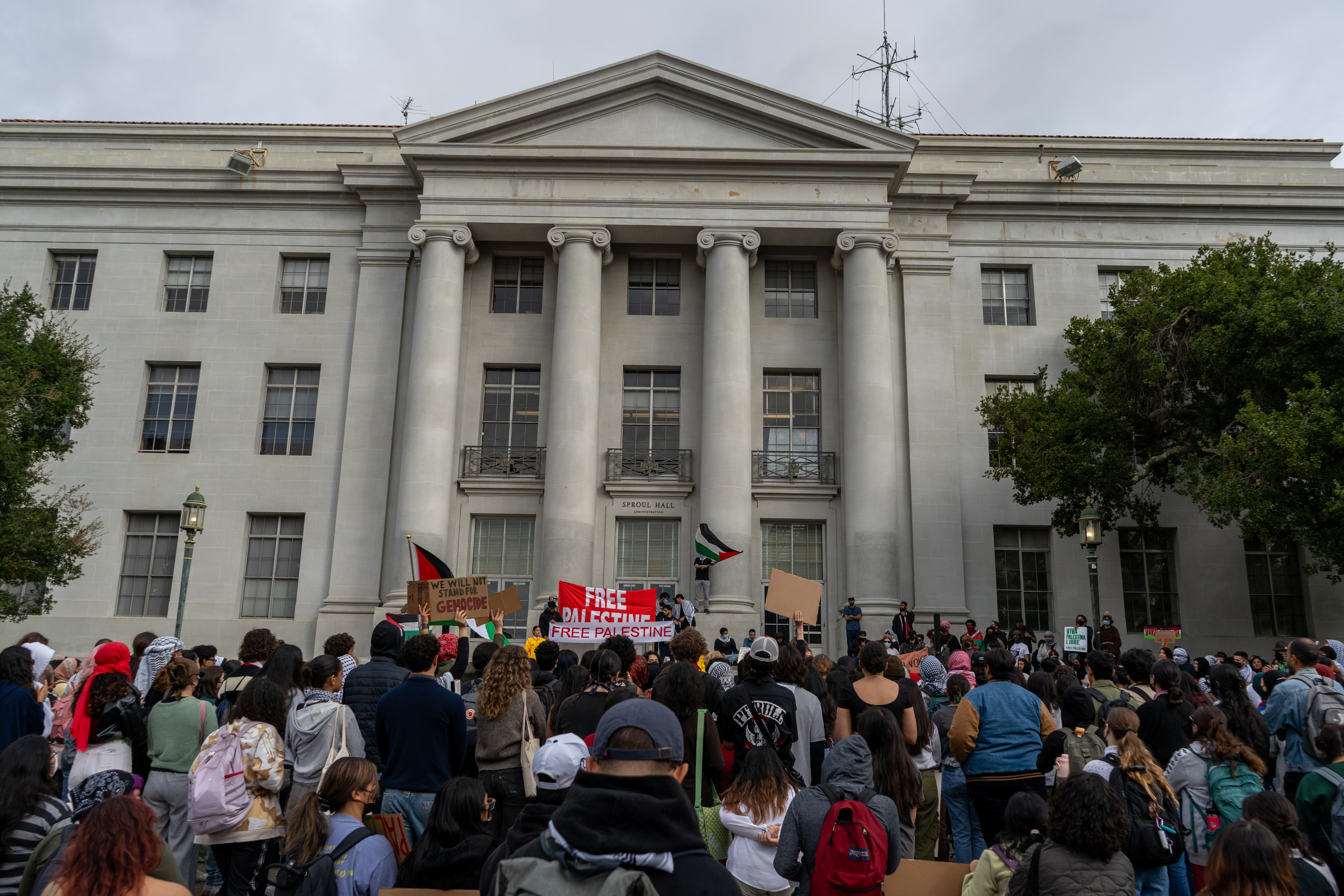
Pro-Palestine protest at UC Berkeley in October 2023

During the Israel–Hamas war that began in October 2023, SJP and various other organizations coordinated nationwide student walkouts on college campuses on October 25, 2023, and February 7, 2024. Their objective was to protest Israeli assaults on Gaza and denounce U.S. financial support for Israel. The walkouts were scheduled at campuses ranging from the University of Massachusetts Amherst, to the University of California, Los Angeles. The national SJP helped organize the National March on Washington: Free Palestine event held on November 4, 2023. SJP organizers reportedly estimated that the 150 active SJP chapters at the beginning of the war were joined by interested students at an additional 80 campuses during fall 2023.

An internal document the national SJP distributed shortly after Hamas's October 7 attack on Israel praised the attack as a "historic win for the Palestinian resistance". It advocated a "day of resistance" on October 12, involving demonstrations by its chapters at over 200 colleges in the U.S. and Canada. Some university administrators criticized the organization for this.

In September 2024, the group's national leadership shared—and later deleted—a post saying that the ultimate goal of divestment is "the total collapse of the university structure and the American empire itself. To divest from this is to undermine and eradicate America as we know it".

=== Accusation of support for Hamas ===
The Tufts University SJP branch faced criticism for expressing support for Hamas's 2023 attack on Israel in an email. In a letter, Tufts SJP commended Hamas's "creativity" in launching the attack. The university disapproved of the statement, emphasizing that no student group speaks for the university. The Anti-Defamation League's New England chapter condemned Tufts SJP's remarks as "obscene". Harvard's Hillel called the student group's letter an "outrageous statement that blames Israel for the violence carried out by Hamas terrorists—a group that has opposed peace and called for Israel's destruction since it was founded." The Tufts SJP chapter organized an October 10 vigil mourning the lives lost in Gaza over the preceding days, then numbering nearly 1,000.

In October 2023, Florida governor Ron DeSantis directed state universities to ban SJP on campuses, alleging that it illegally supported Hamas militants who attacked Israel. State University System of Florida chancellor Ray Rodrigues issued the directive, basing the ban on a "toolkit" the national organization gave its chapters calling Hamas's attack "the resistance" and asserting that "Palestinian students in exile are integral to this movement". The university system cited Florida law criminalizing support for designated foreign terrorist organizations. SJP was active at at least two Florida universities, the University of Florida and the University of South Florida. The move was described as part of DeSantis's heightened pro-Israel stance during the Gaza war and drew criticism for potentially suppressing speech on campuses.

On October 25, the Anti-Defamation League (ADL), in collaboration with the Louis D. Brandeis Center for Human Rights Under Law, sent an open letter to over 200 colleges urging them to investigate SJP chapters for supporting Hamas. The ADL wrote that many SJP chapters endorsed Hamas's attack on Israel, potentially violating laws against material support for terror groups. SJP denies these claims, asserting that independent protests for Palestinian rights do not constitute support for terrorism.

In November 2024, SJP's co-president and former president at George Mason University were banned from campus and subjected to a police raid on their home. According to the local authorities, the police found weapons belonging to their family members, Hamas and Hezbollah flags, and "patches that call for death to Jews and America". More than 90 advocacy organizations signed a letter in protest of the campus bans and police search, and the Council on American–Islamic Relations said it was an attempt to suppress pro-Palestinian speech. The students' lawyer said that the patches were incorrectly translated and that the students had been racially profiled. As of December 2024, no charges had been filed.

== Reception ==
=== Accusations of antisemitism ===
Pro-Israel and Jewish organizations have said that SJP promotes antisemitism. The Louis D. Brandeis Center for Human Rights Under Law has described the network as "celebrating terrorism". The pro-Israel AMCHA Initiative has published a report on what it considers the association between SJP groups, the BDS movement, and campus antisemitism, including a 2015 report that said "the presence of an anti-Zionist student group such as Students for Justice in Palestine" is one of the two "best statistical predictors of overall antisemitic activity on a campus". A 2016 followup report said that antisemitism was "eight times more likely to occur on campuses with at least one active anti-Zionist student group such as SJP". A 2016 report by researchers at the Steinhardt Social Research Institute concurred with the AMCHA Initiative's report.

According to Mark Rotenberg, vice president for university initiatives and general counsel for Hillel, "SJP is a primary source of aggressive and hostile anti-Israel and antisemitic activity that targets university campuses". In 2023, Haaretz said, "based on dozens of conversations with Jewish students on U.S. campuses since October 7", that "a sizable majority seem to feel that by legitimizing and even glorifying the atrocities perpetuated by Hamas, and by showing no empathy for fellow Jewish students grieving for the victims, SJP has crossed the line from anti-Zionist to antisemitic". The Jerusalem Center for Public Affairs published a book titled Students for Justice in Palestine Unmasked that documents many instances of the group reportedly supporting antisemitism and violence and connections between the group and U.S.-designated terror groups.

=== BDS forum at Brooklyn College ===
On February 7, 2013, Brooklyn College's (BC) SJP chapter organized an open forum on the BDS movement and boycotts of Israel, co-sponsored by the college's political science department. The speakers were Judith Butler, an American philosopher who supports the BDS movement, and Omar Barghouti, a Palestinian co-founder of the movement. The forum attracted widespread media attention, including criticism from the Anti-Defamation League; Alan Dershowitz, who called it an "anti-Israel hatefest"; and New York politicians, who said they would stop funding the college if the event were held. The forum took place, with around 200 people in the audience and 150 anti-BDS protesters gathered outside.

During Butler's speech, four Jewish BC students—Yvonne Juris, Melanie Goldberg, Ari Ziegler, and one unnamed student—were asked to leave. They had brought with them anti-BDS literature and flyers that they intended to hand out. According to Goldberg, the organizers confronted them, demanded they hand over the papers, and asked a security guard to remove them from the event. Subsequently, the organizers were accused of antisemitism for evicting the Jewish students, and of stifling free speech. Four months later, the Zionist Organization of America (ZOA) filed a legal complaint against the college, alleging anti-Jewish discrimination. As a result, BC conducted a two-month investigation, and the student organizers of the event sought legal help from the Center for Constitutional Rights. The investigation's 40-page report found that the eviction was not discriminatory but based on a "political viewpoint". BC eventually settled with ZOA, and then-BC president Karen L. Gould apologized for how the school had handled the event.

=== Suspensions ===
In February 2014, SJP at Northeastern University posted fake eviction notices throughout student housing, designed to look like the Israeli demolition notices distributed to Palestinians. The campus Hillel called the notices "a campaign of intimidation and fear". In response, the university suspended SJP from campus for a year and distributed a letter to students saying that targeting and intimidation would not be condoned. SJP accused the university of suppressing criticism of Israel and collected a petition of 6,000 signatures in support of its reinstatement. The university reached an agreement with SJP in April that lifted the suspension in exchange for a semester of probation, during which SJP was required to elect new leadership.

In mid-November 2023, George Washington University suspended SJP's activity on its campus after SJP activists projected slogans including "glory to our martyrs" and "free Palestine from the river to the sea" on the building of the Estelle and Melvin Gelman Library. In November, Columbia University also suspended its chapter of SJP, saying that the group, along with Jewish Voice for Peace, had breached university policies by holding unauthorized protests. Within days of the Columbia suspension, the Columbia University Apartheid Divest coalition, involving over 80 student groups, reactivated (it had been dormant since 2020) and continued activism in support of a ceasefire, university divestment, and breaking ties with Israeli institutions.

In the wake of the 2024 Columbia University pro-Palestinian campus occupation, the University of Pennsylvania revoked the status of its SJP chapter, and Harvard suspended its Palestine Solidarity Committee. The University of Illinois at Urbana-Champaign revoked its SJP chapter's registered student organisation (RSO) status after seven people were arrested in connection with an SJP protest. The group may reapply for RSO status in 2027.
