= Palestine Solidarity Movement =

Student organization in the United States

The Palestine Solidarity Movement (PSM) is a student organization in the United States which was established in 2000 after the start of the Second Intifada in Israel. The organization aims to use "divestment as a tactic to non-violently influence a just resolution to the Israeli–Palestinian conflict." Aside from divestment from Israel, the group focuses on ending U.S. aid to Israel and a Right of return. PSM tactics include: education; public demonstrations and rallies; and civil disobedience or direct action.

The PSM has not taken any policy stances for adoption by the Palestinian people, and therefore refuses to denounce terrorism by Palestinians, stating that "as a solidarity movement, it is not our place to dictate the strategies or tactics adopted by the Palestinian people in their struggle for liberation."

The Anti-Defamation League has held numerous protests against PSM activities. University presidents have received criticism for hosting the conferences, and have usually had to respond to the events through websites and statements.

== Divisions ==
There have been some divisions in the PSM and there have been some other groups that have been formed. The largest of these is the New Jersey Solidarity group, which is centered at Rutgers University. They have held their own separate conferences and events.

== Conferences ==
PSM holds annual conferences at universities throughout America.

Inaugural Divestment Conference

University of California, Berkeley, California – February 16–18, 2002 The first national PSM conference was initiated by Students for Justice in Palestine, a student group from the University of California, Berkeley, in conjunction with the San Francisco chapter of the American-Arab Anti-Discrimination Committee. One of the resolutions adopted at the first PSM conference expressed an unreserved support for the Intifada: "We, the national student movement for solidarity with Palestine, declare our solidarity with the popular resistance to Israeli occupation, colonization, and apartheid."

Second Annual Divestment Conference

University of Michigan, Ann Arbor, Michigan – October 12–14, 2002 The second national PSM conference, held at the University of Michigan in Ann Arbor, attracted over 400 people, included former University of South Florida Professor Sami al-Arian. Representatives of Al-Awda sold T-shirts with the inscription "Intifada! Palestine will be free from the river to the sea." According to two protestors, participants in the conference chanted "Chrad al Yahud", which they claimed means "Death to the Jews" in Arabic. (Transliteration note: "Itbah al Yahud" – slaughter the Jews – or "Khaybar ya Yahood" – Jew, remember Khaybar, are plausible.) This was denied by the Dean of the University of Michigan, who was monitoring the event for any disturbances. Furthermore, "Chrad" is not a word, colloquially or formally, in Arabic. The conference included presentations by a number of American, Palestinian, Jewish, and Israeli academics and speakers supporting divestment from the state of Israel.

Third Annual Divestment Conference

The conference, originally announced for Rutgers University, was actually held in a nearby motel after failing to get permission to use a university facility. October 10–12, 2003

Ohio State University, Columbus, Ohio, – November 7–9, 2003 The OSU conference was hosted by the local Committee for Justice in Palestine and attracted over 200 people. Attendees reaffirmed their commitment to the movement's guiding principles. Resolutions adopted during the conference included a commitment to the divestment campaign and an affirmation of the movement's claim that "Zionism is racism." Conference attendees also reaffirmed the movement's goals: the right of return for Palestinians, a "full decolonization of all Palestinian land" and an end of the Israeli occupation.

Fourth Annual Divestment Conference

Duke University, Oct. 15–17, 2004

Fifth Annual Divestment Conference

Georgetown University, Washington, D.C. – February 17–19

== See also ==
- Fayyad Sbaihat
