= Hatem Bazian =

Palestinian-American Academic and Activist

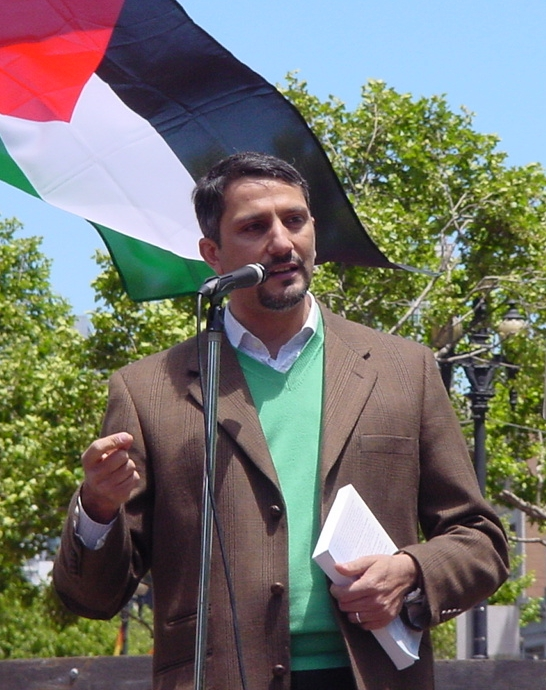
- Bazian in 2009
- Born: Jordan
- Education: San Francisco State University (B.A., M.A.); University of California, Berkeley (Ph.D.)
- Occupations: Academic, activist
- Known for: Co-founding Students for Justice in Palestine, founding American Muslims for Palestine, Islamophobia research, founding Islamophobia Studies Journal
- Title: Teaching Professor, UC Berkeley; Co-founder, Zaytuna College; President, International Islamophobia Studies Research Association

Hatem Bazian is a Palestinian-American academic and activist. He is a teaching professor in the Departments of Near Eastern and Asian American and Asian Diaspora Studies at the University of California, Berkeley, and co-founder and Professor of Islamic Law and Theology at Zaytuna College, the first accredited Muslim liberal arts college in the United States.

Bazian is known for his involvement in Palestinian activism on college campuses. He co-founded the first chapter of Students for Justice in Palestine at UC Berkeley in the 1990s and later founded American Muslims for Palestine in 2006.

== Early life and education ==
Bazian was born in Jordan to parents from Nablus and Jerusalem. After completing high school, he moved to the United States to study at San Francisco State University, where he first earned a B.A. in International Relations and Speech/Communication, followed by an M.A. in International Relations. He later received his Ph.D. in Philosophy and Islamic Studies from the University of California, Berkeley in 2002.

During his time at San Francisco State University, Bazian was elected president of the Associated Students and its Student Union Governing Board. He also became president of the General Union of Palestine Students (GUPS), and was a leader of the Muslim Students Association.

== Academic career ==
=== University of California, Berkeley ===
Bazian is currently a teaching professor in the Departments of Near Eastern and Asian American and Asian Diaspora Studies. He also serves as a Continuing Lecturer with Berkeley's Center for Race and Gender. Bazian's research interests include Arabic Language, Arab Society and Culture, Classical Arabic Literature and Poetry, Qur'anic Commentary, Post-Colonial Studies, Muslim American Studies, Diaspora Studies, Critical Race Theory, and Palestine Studies, among more.

Between 2002 and 2007, Bazian also served as an adjunct professor of law at UC Berkeley School of Law. From 2001 to 2007, he was a visiting professor in Religious Studies at Saint Mary's College of California and served as an adviser to the Religion, Politics and Globalization Center at UC Berkeley. In Spring 2015, Bazian was the Tolson Visiting Scholar at the Pacific School of Religion.

=== Zaytuna College ===
In the early 2000s, Bazian co-founded Zaytuna College alongside Hamza Yusuf and Zaid Shakir, establishing it as the first independently accredited Muslim liberal arts college in the United States. The college, located in Berkeley, California, offers bachelor's and master's degrees in Islamic law and theology. Bazian has described the founding as a response to growing complexities facing the Muslim community after the September 11 attacks, particularly the need for an academic institution that integrated Western and Islamic traditions. He serves as co-founder and Professor of Islamic Law and Theology at the institution.

=== Islamophobia research ===
Bazian is considered a leading scholar in the Islamophobia Studies field. In 2009, Bazian founded the Islamophobia Research and Documentation Project (IRDP) at UC Berkeley's Center for Race and Gender, dedicated to the systematic study of anti-Muslim sentiment and "Othering" of Islam and Muslims. In 2012, he launched the Islamophobia Studies Journal, and serves as its Editor-in-Chief. The journal is published bi-annually through collaborative efforts between UC Berkeley, San Francisco State University, the Graduate Theological Union, the University of South Australia, and Zaytuna College.

He co-founded and currently serves as President of the International Islamophobia Studies Research Association (IISRA). In 2018, Bazian contributed to the Carter Center's report "Countering the Islamophobia Industry Toward More Effective Strategies." In 2021, Bazian advised on the UN Special Rapporteur on Freedom of Religion or Belief report on "Countering Islamophobia/Anti-Muslim Hatred to Eliminate Discrimination and Intolerance Based on Religion or Belief."

== Activism and organizational involvement ==
Bazian is a prominent founder and leader in multiple organizations. He co-founded American Muslims for Palestine (AMP) in 2006 and serves as its National Chair. He also serves in leadership roles with the Northern California Islamic Council, Islamic Scholarship Fund, Muslim Legal Fund of America, and Dollar for Deen Charity.

=== Students for Justice in Palestine ===
While a graduate student at UC Berkeley, Bazian helped support the establishment of the first Students for Justice in Palestine (SJP) chapter, originally founded by Osama Qasem in 1993. Self-described as a co-founder of SJP, Bazian has described putting the organization "on [his] organizing shoulders and brought [it] into the center of progressive networking on campus and nationally." After the original organization went defunct in 1999, Bazian "renamed and redesigned" the campus chapter of GUPS into a revived SJP under his leadership.

The renewed SJP chapter engaged in provocative demonstrations, including blocking campus gates to simulate Israeli checkpoints and chaining most doors of a campus building shut during protests. The organization grew from a single chapter to a national network with hundreds of chapters across the United States and Canada, maintaining a deliberately decentralized structure with no formal national hierarchy.

=== American Muslims for Palestine ===
In 2006, Bazian founded American Muslims for Palestine (AMP), which he currently chairs. The organization describes itself as "a grassroots organization dedicated to advancing the movement for justice in Palestine" via education, advocacy and organizing. The AMP supports "campus activism through Students for Justice in Palestine and Muslim Student Associations."

== Controversies ==
=== American Muslim Alliance comments ===
In 1999, according to Steven Emerson's book American Jihad, Bazian spoke at an American Muslim Alliance conference where he advocated for the creation of an Islamic State of Palestine and quoted a Hadith about fighting Jews: "The Day of Judgment will never happen until you fight the Jews... until the trees and stones will say, 'oh Muslim, there is a Jew hiding behind me. Come and kill him!'" In a later interview with American commentator Bill O'Reilly, Bazian denied ever having invoked the hadith, stating he "would never use that statement...[i]t's a part of the Hadith collections, references to the end of time...[a]nd I in general don't use that in any type of speech or discussions."

=== 2002 comments about Jewish building donors ===
In 2002, as a graduate student at Berkeley, Bazian attracted controversy when, during an anti-Israel protest, he told attendees to "take a look at the type of names on the building around campus—Haas, Zellerbach—and decide who controls this university," referencing major Jewish donors to the university. The protest coincided with a Holocaust Remembrance Day event, and followed the arrest of 79 Students for Justice in Palestine members who had attempted to disrupt the remembrance ceremony.

=== "Intifada" speech (2004) ===
In April 2004, at an anti-war rally in San Francisco, Bazian called for an "intifada" in the United States, saying "How come we don't have an intifada in this country?" and "It's about time we have an intifada in this country!" He added, "They're going to say some Palestinian being too radical – well, you haven't seen radicalism yet!"

Following the speech, Bazian received approximately 100,000 critical emails, including numerous death threats.

When questioned about the remarks on Fox News's The O'Reilly Factor, Bazian claimed he was calling for a "grassroot political change" and defined intifada as "shaking off," denying any call for violence.

=== Antisemitic social media controversy (2017) ===
In November 2017, Bazian retweeted antisemitic memes on social media. The images included one showing an Orthodox Jewish man with the caption "I can now kill, rape, smuggle organs & steal the land of Palestinians" with the hashtag "#Ashke-Nazi," and another showing North Korean leader Kim Jong-Un wearing a kippah claiming conversion to Judaism and stating "Now my nukes are legal & I can annex South Korea & you need to start paying me 34 billion a year in welfare." The content was shared from an account that regularly used antisemitic language, questioned the Holocaust, and denied that Jews existed in the biblical period.

Following the incident, Jewish student groups at UC Berkeley sent a letter to university administrators urging "decisive action" and citing Bazian's "consistent pattern of spreading or justifying anti-Semitism." UC Berkeley spokesman Dan Mogulof stated that while the university did not consider all criticism of Israel inherently antisemitic, "the social media posts in question clearly crossed the line." Bazian apologized, claiming he had not carefully examined the content before retweeting.

=== Government scrutiny ===
Bazian's organization, American Muslims for Palestine, has faced multiple legal challenges and investigations. In May 2025, a Virginia circuit judge ordered AMP to disclose its funding sources following an investigation by Virginia Attorney General Jason Miyares, who alleged that AMP "may have used funds raised for impermissible purposes under state law, including benefiting or providing support to a terrorist organization." In October 2025, Judge Leonie Brinkema issued an injunction against Miyares.

In 2025, the House Oversight Committee launched a probe into AMP and the National Students for Justice in Palestine over their allegedly "substantial ties to Hamas," subpoenaing AMP for documents and communications. Also in 2025, U.S. Senator Bill Cassidy (on behalf of Senate Health, Education, Labor, and Pensions (HELP) Committee) launched an investigation into the organization's alleged ties to terrorism.

=== Legal proceedings ===
In 2019, Bazian was deposed as part of a civil lawsuit claiming that AMP is a rebranding of the Islamic Association for Palestine.

== Selected works and publications ==
Bazian has authored five books, including Palestine...It is Something Colonial (2016), Annotations on Race, Colonialism, Islamophobia, Islam and Palestine (2017), and Erasing the Human: Collapse of the Postcolonial World and the Refugee‑Immigration Crisis (2021). As editor-in-chief, he has overseen eight volumes of the Islamophobia Studies Journal.

From 2013 to 2016, Bazian was a regular contributor to Al Jazeera. In 2018–2019, he served as a weekly columnist for the Turkish Daily Sabah newspaper and Turkey Agenda online magazine.

== Awards and recognition ==
In 2011, Bazian was named one of "The Muslim 500: The World's Most Influential Muslims" in the Social Justice category by The Royal Islamic Strategic Studies Center.
