= Fayyad =

Fayyad (Arabic: فَيَّاض fayyāḍ), also spelt Fayyadh, is an Arabic masculine given name which means "elaborate, flowing, plentiful, abundant". The Persian spelling is Fayyaz.

It may refer to:

== People ==
=== Given name ===
- Fayyad Abdel Moneim (born 1957), Egyptian academic and economist
- Fayyad Sbaihat, a Palestinian American writer
- Fayyad, fictional arms trafficker in the 2023 Indian film Pathaan

=== Surname ===
- Feras Fayyad, Syrian documentary filmmaker, director of Last Men in Aleppo and The Cave
- Mohammad Ishaq Al-Fayyad, a Grand Ayatollah of Iraq
- Salam Fayyad, a Palestinian politician
- Usama Fayyad, Yahoo!'s chief data officer and executive vice president of Research & Strategic Data Solutions

== See also ==
- Fayad, a given name and surname
- Fayyazi (disambiguation)
