= Osama Abu Irshaid =

American board member

Osama Abu Irshaid is a Jordanian writer and researcher based in Washington DC. He is a board member and national director for American Muslims for Palestine (AMP), and serves on the board of United States Council of Muslim organizations. He has frequently appeared on media outlets such as National Public Radio, Al Jazeera, Syrian TV, Al-Alam, and Al Hiwar TV as a commentator on Palestinian and Middle Eastern affairs and United States domestic and foreign policy. He completed his master's at Northeastern Illinois University and received his doctorate at Loughborough University. Canary Mission and The Investigative Project on Terrorism have accused Irshaid of antisemitism and ties with Hamas.

== Life ==
Irshaid was born in Jordan and has Palestinian ancestry.

== Gaza War ==
In August 2024, the Council on American-Islamic Relations (CAIR) launched a lawsuit against the US federal government, alleging the existence and use of a "secret watchlist" targeting Palestinian activists protesting against Israel's actions in the Gaza War, including Osama Abu Irshaid and Mustafa Zeidan.

At the Third Palestinian National Dialogue in Istanbul, Turkey in November 2025, Irshaid alleged that Holocaust museums are part of a "Zionist lobby" spreading "false propaganda", and accused Israel of using the Holocaust to blackmail the international community. He also urged the creation of a new "Palestinian genocide" narrative and called for investment in a museum dedicated to the Palestinian people.
