= Feyyaz =

Feyyaz is a Turkish spelling of the Arabic masculine given name Fayyad (Arabic: فَيَّاض fayyāḍ) which means "elaborate, flowing, plentiful, abundant". The Persian spelling is Fayyaz.

People named Feyyaz include:

- Feyyaz Berker (1925-2017), Turkish businessman
- Feyyaz Duman (born 1982), Turkish actor
- Feyyaz Uçar (born 1963), Turkish footballer
