= Tangeh-ye Yek =

Village in Khuzestan province, Iran

Tangeh-ye Yek Persian: تنگه يك
- Village
- Location within Iran
- Coordinates: 30°13′18″N 48°27′38″E
- Country: Iran
- Province: Khuzestan
- County: Abadan
- District: Central
- Rural District: Bahmanshir-e Jonubi

Population (2016)
  - Total: 3,119
- Time zone: UTC+3:30 (IRST)

Tangeh-ye Yek (Persian: تنگه يك) (Note: Also romanized as Tangeh Yek; also known as Bahār Tangeh (بهارتنگه), Tang Yek, Tangeh, Tingeh, and Tongeh) is a village in Bahmanshir-e Jonubi Rural District of the Central District of Abadan County, Khuzestan province, Iran.

== Demographics ==
=== Population ===
At the time of the 2006 National Census, the village's population was 2,726 in 505 households. The following census in 2011 counted 2,743 people in 621 households. The 2016 census measured the population of the village as 3,119 people in 855 households. It was the most populous village in its rural district.
