= Fayad =

Fayard or Fayadh may be a given name or surname.

Notable people with the name include:

== Given name ==
- Fayad Mahmoud Hissain, Bahraini footballer
- Fayad Jamís (1930–1988), Cuban poet, painter, designer, journalist and translator

== Surname: Fayad ==
- Ali Fayad (disambiguation), multiple people
- Álvaro Fayad aka "The Turk" (1946–1986), Colombian guerrilla, co-founder and leader of the 19th of April movement (M-19)
- José Antonio Gali Fayad (born 1959), Mexican politician
- Zulma Fayad, Argentinian actress of Lebanese ethnic origins
- Mahmoud Fayad (1925–2002), Egyptian featherweight weightlifter and Olympian
- Mohamed Fayad, Egyptian-American professor of Computer Engineering
- Omar Fayad (born 1962), Mexican politician
- Said Fayad (1921–2003), Lebanese poet and literary journalist
- Victor Fayad (1955–2014), Argentine politician and lawyer
- Khalil Fayad (born 2004), French-Moroccan football player

== Surname: Fayadh ==
- Ashraf Fayadh (born 1980), Saudi Arabian poet imprisoned and lashed for apostasy
- Shafiq Fayadh (1937–2015), Syrian military commander and close adviser to President Hafez al-Assad

== Surname: Fayard ==
- Joseph-Arthème Fayard

== See also ==
- Fayyad (disambiguation)
