= Fayazi =

Village in Khuzestan province, Iran

Fayazi Persian: فياضي
- Village
- Location within Iran
- Coordinates: 30°24′45″N 48°14′18″E
- Country: Iran
- Province: Khuzestan
- County: Abadan
- District: Central
- Rural District: Bahmanshir-e Shomali

Population (2016)
  - Total: 2,225
- Time zone: UTC+3:30 (IRST)

Fayazi (Persian: فياضي) (Note: Also romanized as Fayāzī, Fayyāzī, and Fayyāẕī; also known as Faiyeh) is a village in Bahmanshir-e Shomali Rural District of the Central District of Abadan County, Khuzestan province, Iran.

== Demographics ==
=== Population ===
At the time of the 2006 National Census, the village's population was 1,893 in 305 households. The following census in 2011 counted 2,253 people in 542 households. The 2016 census measured the population of the village as 2,225 people in 614 households. It was the most populous village in its rural district.
