= Tura, Russia =

Tura (Russian: Тура) is the name of several rural localities in Russia:

- Tura, Krasnoyarsk Krai, a settlement in Evenkiysky District of Krasnoyarsk Krai
- Tura, Udmurt Republic, a village in Agrikolsky Selsoviet of Krasnogorsky District in the Udmurt Republic

== See also ==
- Nizhnyaya Tura, a town in Sverdlovsk Oblast
- Verkhnyaya Tura, a town in Sverdlovsk Oblast
