= Seyyed Hasan, Shushtar =

Seyyed Hasan سيدحسن
- Village
- Location within Iran
- Coordinates: 31°43′46″N 48°58′39″E
- Country: Iran
- Province: Khuzestan
- County: Shushtar
- Bakhsh: Central
- Rural District: Shahid Modarres

Population (2006)
  - Total: 318
- Time zone: UTC+3:30 (IRST)
  - Summer (DST): UTC+4:30 (IRDT)

Seyyed Hasan (Persian: سيدحسن, also Romanized as Seyyed Ḩasan; also known as Saiyid Hasan and Seyyed Ḩasan-e Do) is a village in Shahid Modarres Rural District, in the Central District of Shushtar County, Khuzestan Province, Iran. At the 2006 census, its population was 318, in 59 families.
