= Turá =

Turá Tőre
- Municipality
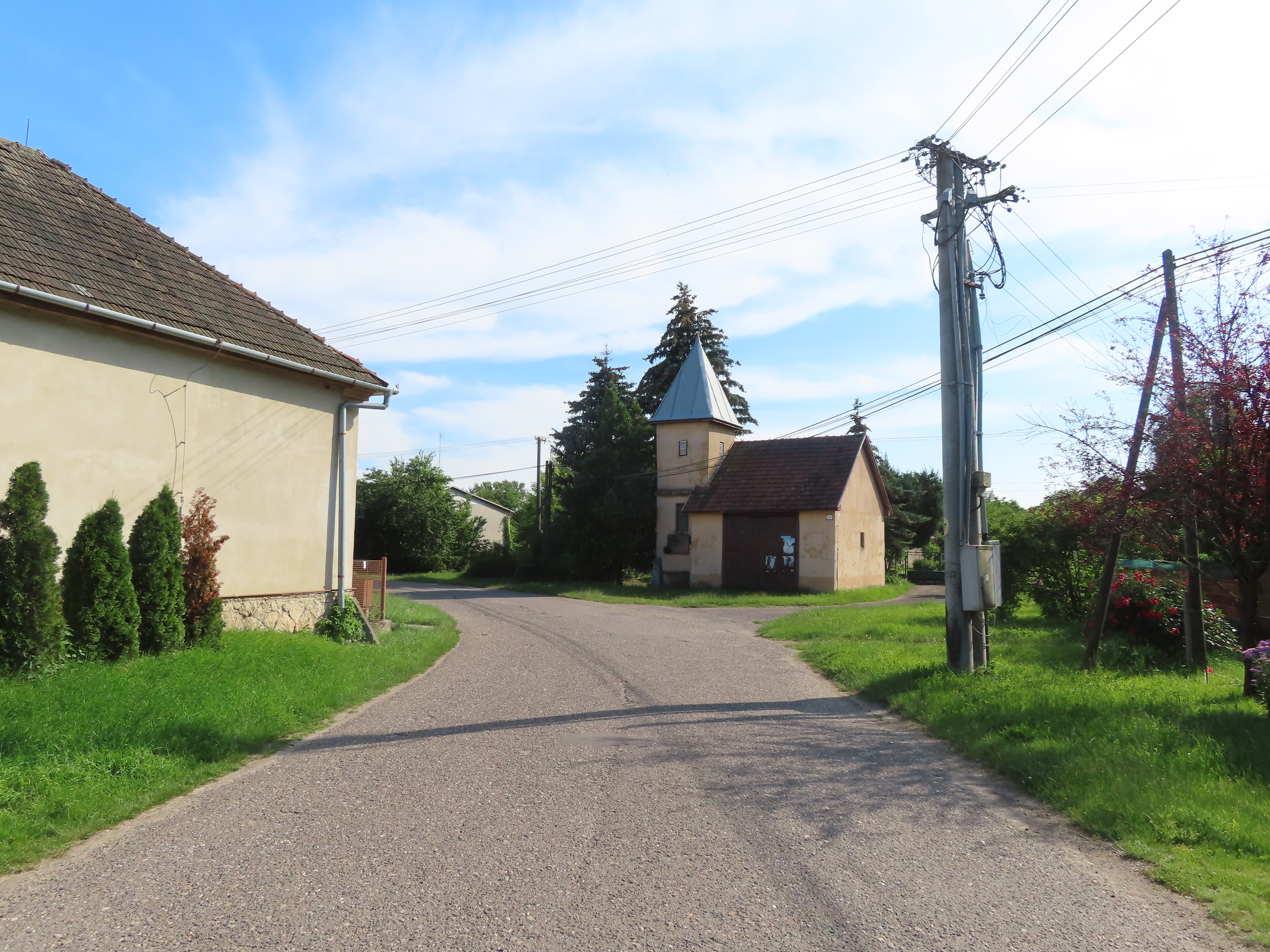

- Flag

- Location of Turá in the Nitra Region Location of Turá in Slovakia
- Coordinates: 48.15°N 18.58°E
- Country: Slovakia
- Region: Nitra Region
- District: Levice District
- First mentioned: 1264

Area
  - Total: 9.28 km^{2} (3.58 sq mi)
- Elevation: 151 m (495 ft)

Population (2025)
  - Total: 228
- Time zone: UTC+1 (CET)
  - Summer (DST): UTC+2 (CEST)
- Postal code: 935 51
- Area code: +421 36
- Vehicle registration plate (until 2022): LV
- Website: www.obectura.sk

Turá (Hungarian: Tőre) is a village and municipality in the Levice District in the Nitra Region of Slovakia.

== History ==
In historical records the village was first mentioned in 1264.

== Geography ==
The municipality lies at an altitude of 151 metres (495 ft) and covers an area of 9.28 km^{2} (3.58 sq mi) (2025).

== Population ==
Population statistic (10 years)
Year	1995	2005	2015	2025
Count	255	246	215	228
Difference		−3.52%	−12.60%	+6.04%

Population statistic
Year	2024	2025
Count	229	228
Difference		−0.43%

It has a population of 228 people (31 December 2025).

=== Ethnicity ===
Census 2021 (1+ %)
Ethnicity	Number	Fraction
Slovak	140	65.11%
Hungarian	80	37.2%
Not found out	5	2.32%
Serbian	4	1.86%
Total	215	

In year 2021 was 215 people by ethnicity 140 as Slovak, 80 as Hungarian, 5 as Not found out, 4 as Serbian and 1 as Russian.

Note on population: The difference values of population numbers in the table "Population statistic" and in the sections "Ethnicity" & "Religion" is caused by the use of various statistical methods.

=== Religion ===
Census 2021 (1+ %)
Religion	Number	Fraction
Roman Catholic Church	110	51.16%
None	77	35.81%
Calvinist Church	16	7.44%
Not found out	5	2.33%
Evangelical Church	3	1.4%
Total	215	

In year 2021 was 215 people by religion 110 from Roman Catholic Church, 77 from None, 16 from Calvinist Church, 5 from Not found out, 3 from Evangelical Church, 2 from Greek Catholic Church, 1 from Eastern Orthodox Church and 1 from Baptists Church.

== Facilities ==
The village has a public library and football pitch.
