= Tangeh-ye Olya =

Tangeh-ye Olya تنگه عليا
- Village
- Location within Iran
- Coordinates: 36°31′08″N 58°36′58″E
- Country: Iran
- Province: Razavi Khorasan
- County: Nishapur
- Bakhsh: Central
- Rural District: Binalud

Population (2006)
  - Total: 67
- Time zone: UTC+3:30 (IRST)
  - Summer (DST): UTC+4:30 (IRDT)

Tangeh-ye Olya (Persian: تنگه عليا, also Romanized as Tangeh-ye ‘Olyā; also known as Tangeh-ye Bālā) is a village in Binalud Rural District, in the Central District of Nishapur County, Razavi Khorasan Province, Iran. At the 2006 census, its population was 67, in 24 families.
