= Tura, Udmurt Republic =

Coordinates: 57°40′38″N 52°25′53″E

Tura Тура
- Interactive map of Tura
- Country: Russia
- Republic: Udmurt Republic
- Municipal District: Krasnogorsk

Tura is a village in Krasnogorsk region of Udmurt Republic.

== Geography ==
It is located in the northwestern part of Udmurtia at a distance of approximately 3 km southwest in a straight line from the regional center of the village Krasnogorskoye.

== History ==
Known since 1802 as the repair of Uziturga in 4 courtyards. In 1873 there were 8 households here (Uzinshurinskaya or Tura), in 1905 — 25, in 1924 (already the village of Tura) — 41. Until 2021, she was part of the Agrikol rural settlement.

== Population ==
The resident population was 86 (1873), 258 (1905), 234 (1924,), 79 people in 2002, 66 in 2012.
