= Ćafa, Podgorica =

Ćafa Ћафа
- Village
- Location within Montenegro
- Country: Montenegro
- Municipality: Podgorica

Population (2011)
  - Total: 102
- Time zone: UTC+1 (CET)
  - Summer (DST): UTC+2 (CEST)

Ćafa (Serbian Cyrillic: Ћафа) is a village in the municipality of Podgorica, Montenegro.

== Demographics ==
According to the 2011 census, its population was 102.

Ethnicity in 2011
Ethnicity	Number	Percentage
Montenegrins	68	66.7%
Serbs	29	28.4%
other/undeclared	5	4.9%
Total	102	100%
