= Tura (name) =

Tura may refer to the following people

Given name

- Tura Satana (1938–2011), American actress and former exotic dancer

Surname

- Agnolo di Tura, a 14th-century Italian chronicler
- Cosimo Tura (c. 1430–1495), Italian painter
- Eshetu Tura (born 1950), Ethiopian long-distance runner
- Jordi Solé Tura (1930–2009), Spanish politician
- Montserrat Tura (born 1954), Spanish politician
- Tai Tura (born 1949), Cook Islands politician
- Will Tura (born 1940), Belgian singer
