= Dast-e Khezr =

Dast-e Khezr دستخضر
- Village
- Location within Iran
- Coordinates: 29°34′43″N 52°38′09″E
- Country: Iran
- Province: Fars
- County: Shiraz
- Bakhsh: Central
- Rural District: Kaftarak

Population (2006)
  - Total: 5,540
- Time zone: UTC+3:30 (IRST)
  - Summer (DST): UTC+4:30 (IRDT)

Dast-e Khezr (Persian: دست خضر, also Romanized as Dast-e Kheẕr; also known as Kheẕr) is a village in Kaftarak Rural District, in the Central District of Shiraz County, Fars province, Iran. At the 2006 census, its population was 5,540, in 1,401 families.
