= Fayyad Sbaihat =

Fayyad Sbaihat (Arabic: فياض صبيحات) born in Jenin, Palestine, is a Palestinian-American writer.

== Life ==
As a student activist, Fayyad focused on corporate ethics, social responsibility in investing, and human rights. In line with a movement modeled after the anti-apartheid corporate divestment campaign directed at Apartheid South Africa in the 1970s and 1980s.

He became one of the leaders of and the national spokesperson of the Palestine Solidarity Movement, the umbrella organization that coordinates the divestment campaign across the US colleges. Fayyad later wrote a divestment handbook titled "Fighting the New Apartheid".

While in college, Fayyad contributed a regular column to the student newspaper The Badger Herald, covering a variety of political issues, but focusing on the Middle East.

== See also ==
- Economic and political boycotts of Israel
- Academic boycotts of Israel
- Palestinian Campaign for the Academic and Cultural Boycott of Israel
- Boycott, Divestment and Sanctions
