= Seyyed Hoseyn, Rostam =

Seyyed Hoseyn سيدحسين
- Village
- Location within Iran
- Coordinates: 30°29′55″N 51°19′56″E
- Country: Iran
- Province: Fars
- County: Rostam
- Bakhsh: Sorna
- Rural District: Poshtkuh-e Rostam

Population (2006)
  - Total: 62
- Time zone: UTC+3:30 (IRST)
  - Summer (DST): UTC+4:30 (IRDT)

Seyyed Hoseyn (Persian: سيدحسين, also Romanized as Seyyed Ḩoseyn; also known as Seyyed Ḩasan) is a village in Poshtkuh-e Rostam Rural District, Sorna District, Rostam County, Fars province, Iran. At the 2006 census, its population was 62, in 12 families.
