= Seyyed Hasan, Ahvaz =

Village in Khuzestan, Iran

Seyyed Hasan سيدحسن
- Village
- Location within Iran
- Coordinates: 31°41′43″N 48°34′27″E
- Country: Iran
- Province: Khuzestan
- County: Ahvaz
- Bakhsh: Central
- Rural District: Elhayi

Population (2006)
  - Total: 163
- Time zone: UTC+3:30 (IRST)
  - Summer (DST): UTC+4:30 (IRDT)

Seyyed Hasan (Persian: سيدحسن, also Romanized as Seyyed Ḩasan; also known as Seyyed Ḩoseyn) is a village in Elhayi Rural District, in the Central District of Ahvaz County, Khuzestan Province, Iran. At the 2006 census, its population was 163, in 37 families.
