= Ḱafa =

Ḱafa Ќафа Qafë
- Village
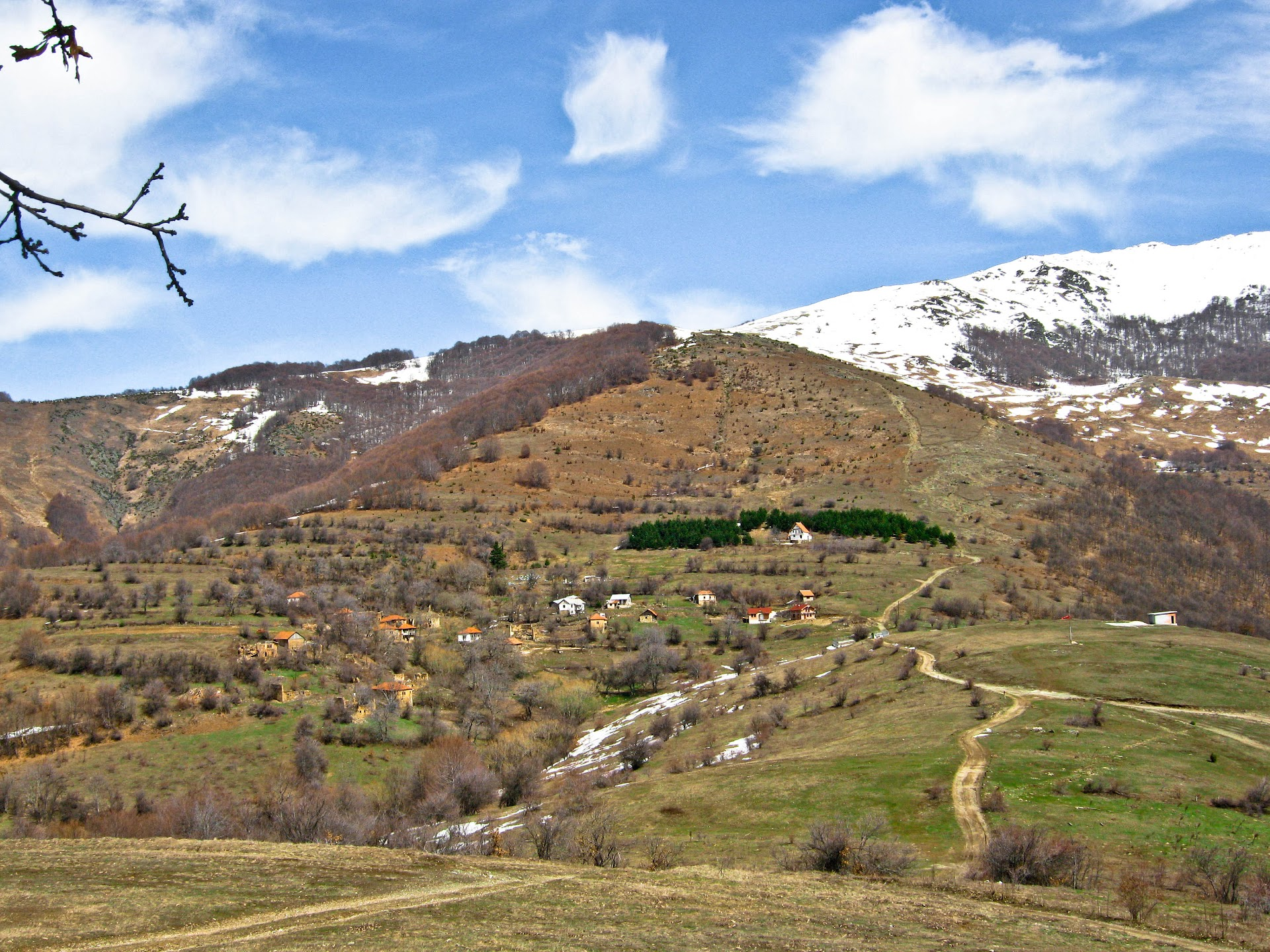
- Ḱafa

- Location within North Macedonia
- Coordinates: 41°39′N 21°01′E
- Country: North Macedonia
- Region: Polog
- Municipality: Gostivar

Population (2021)
  - Total: 0
- Time zone: UTC+1 (CET)
  - Summer (DST): UTC+2 (CEST)
- Car plates: KI
- Website: .

Ḱafa (Macedonian: Ќафа, Albanian: Qafë) is a village in the municipality of Gostivar, North Macedonia. The name of the village comes from Albanian word qafë meaning "neck".

== History ==
During the period of 1912–1913, Chetnik forces under the leadership of Mikajle Brodski massacred a total of 65 Albanian men, women and children from the village. One particular incident, occurred when a local girl named Sulltana the daughter of Mazllam, grabbed a pair of scissors and killed Mikajle's nephew while wounding two other chetniks before being killed herself. Sulltana of Qafe became ingrained in the local folklore of the region.

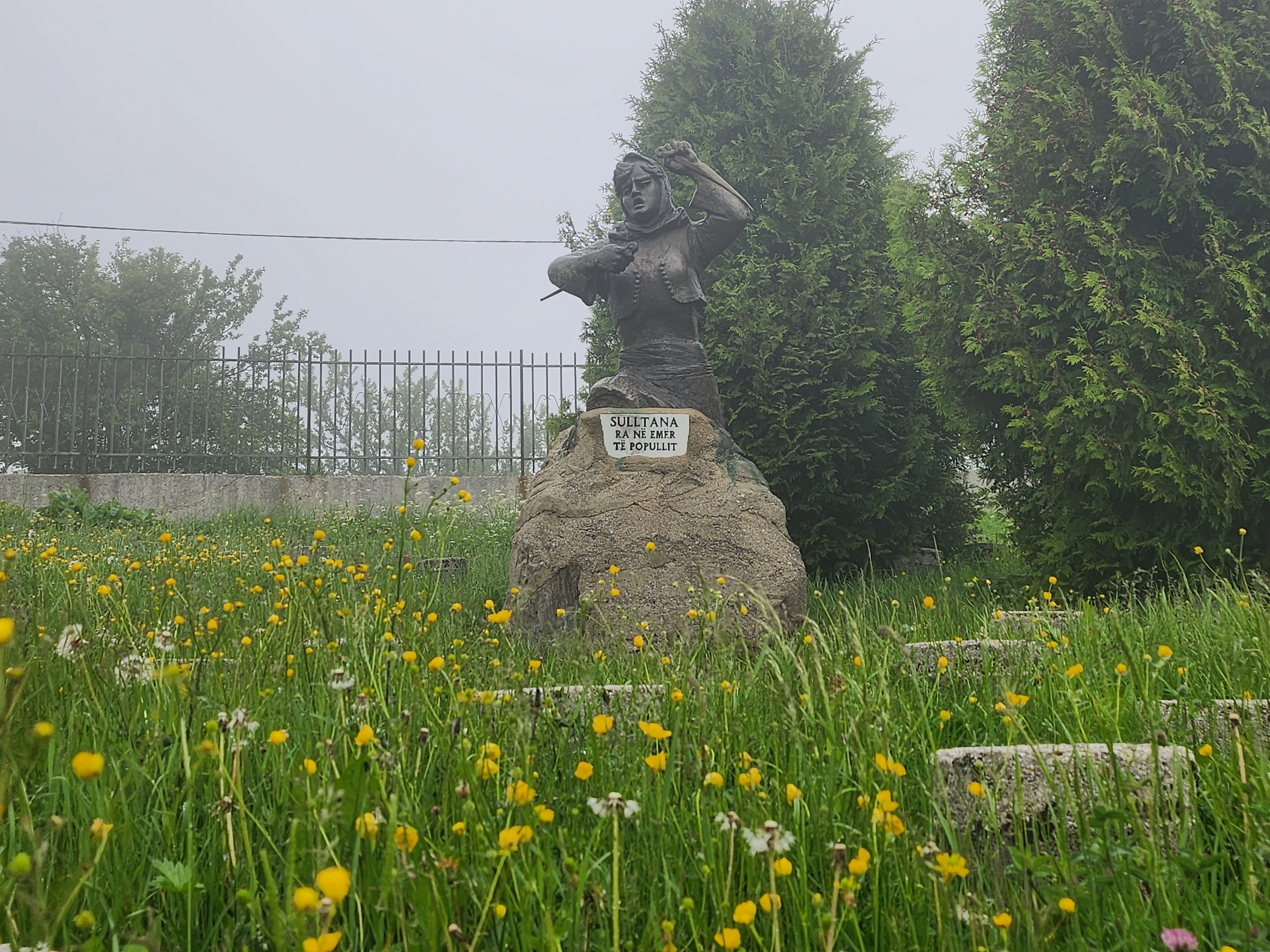
Statue of Sulltana, the local heroine of Qafa.

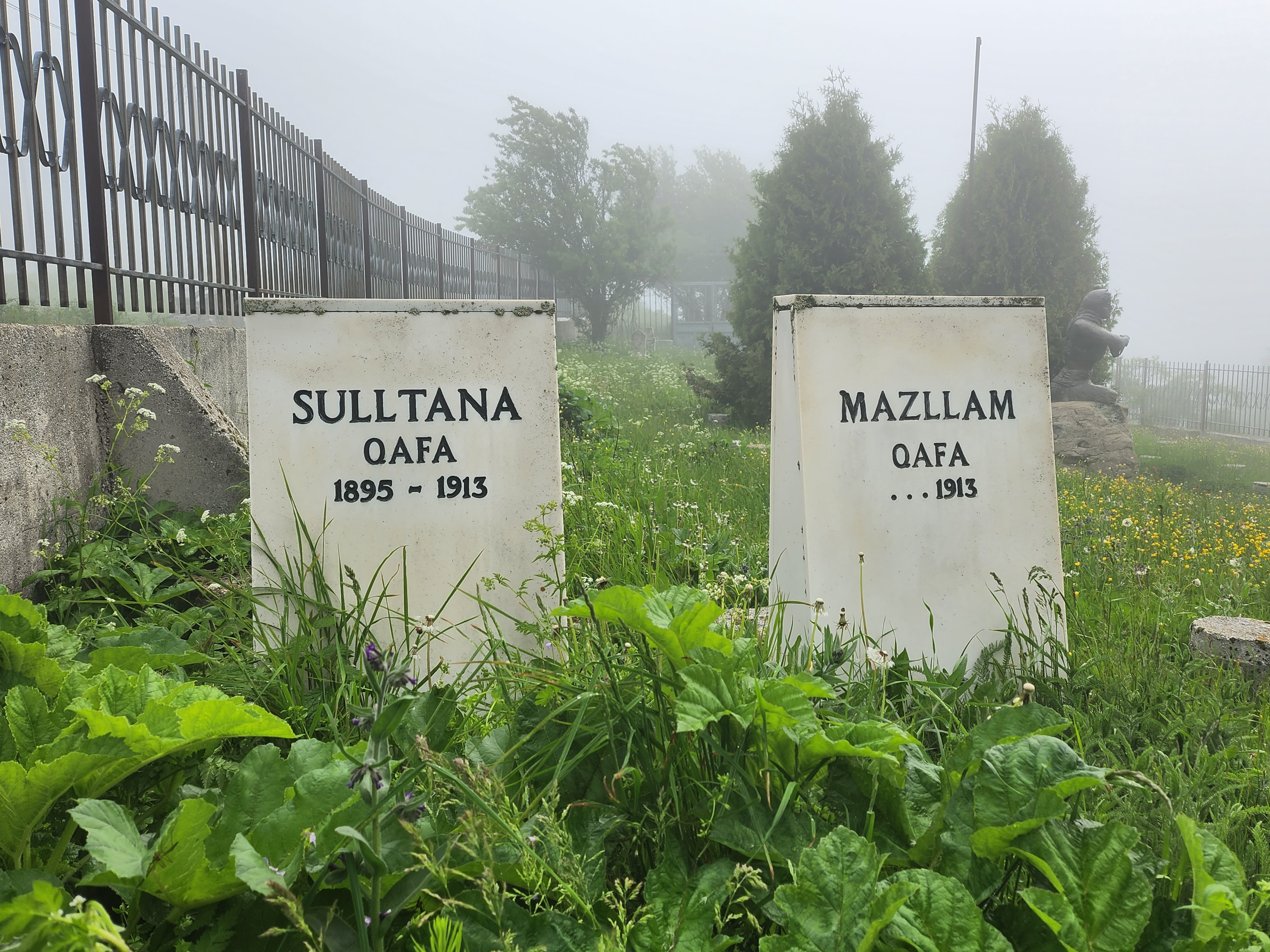
Graves of Sulltana and her father Mazllam, in Qafa.

== Demographics ==
As of the 2021 census, Ḱafa had zero residents.

According to the 2002 census, the village had a total of 5 inhabitants. Ethnic groups in the village include:

- Albanians 5

According to the 1942 Albanian census, Ḱafa was inhabited by 182 Muslim Albanians.

== Gallery ==
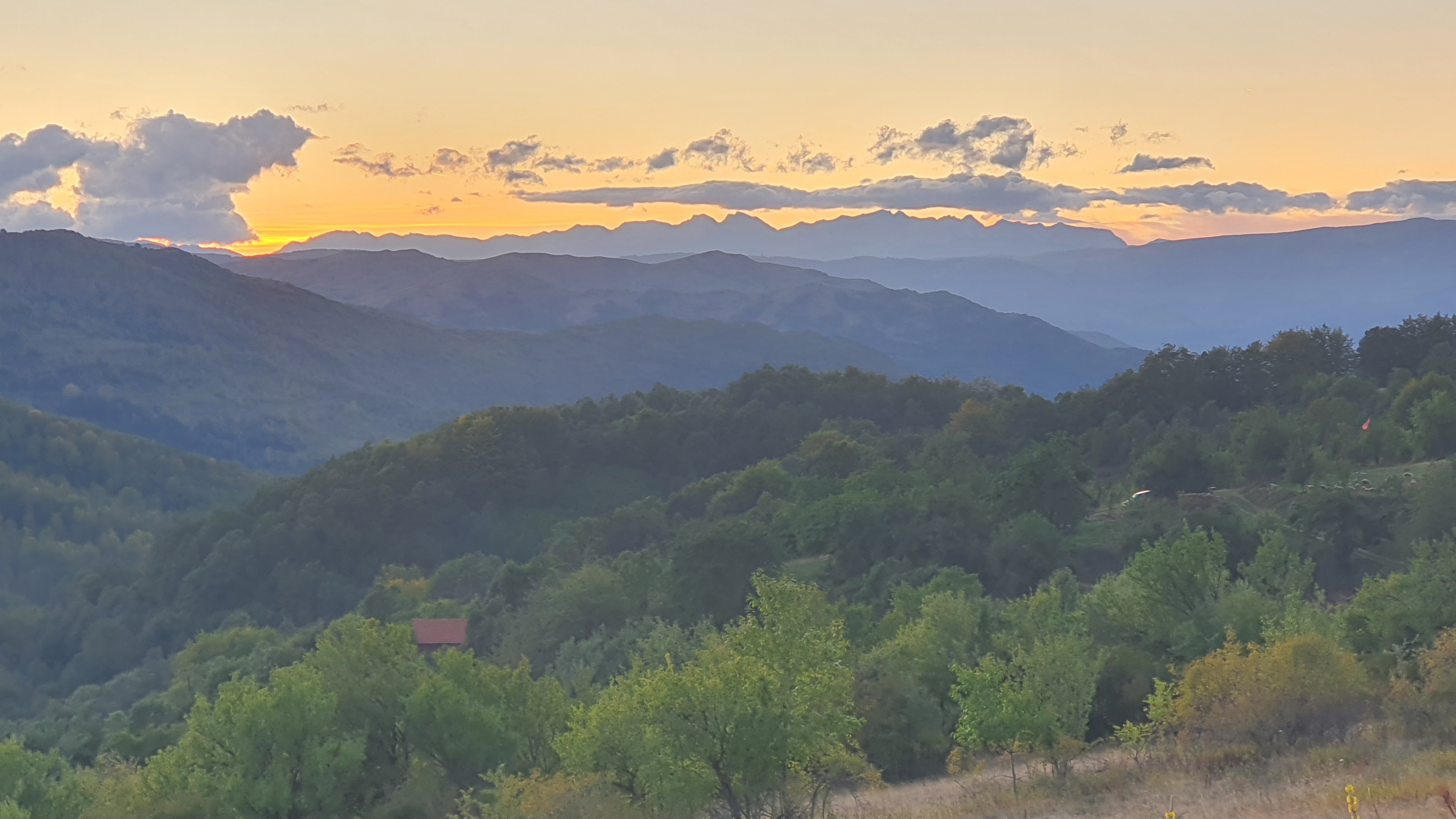
View of Korab (mountain) from the village of Qafë. Mt Korab is the tallest mountain in North Macedonia.

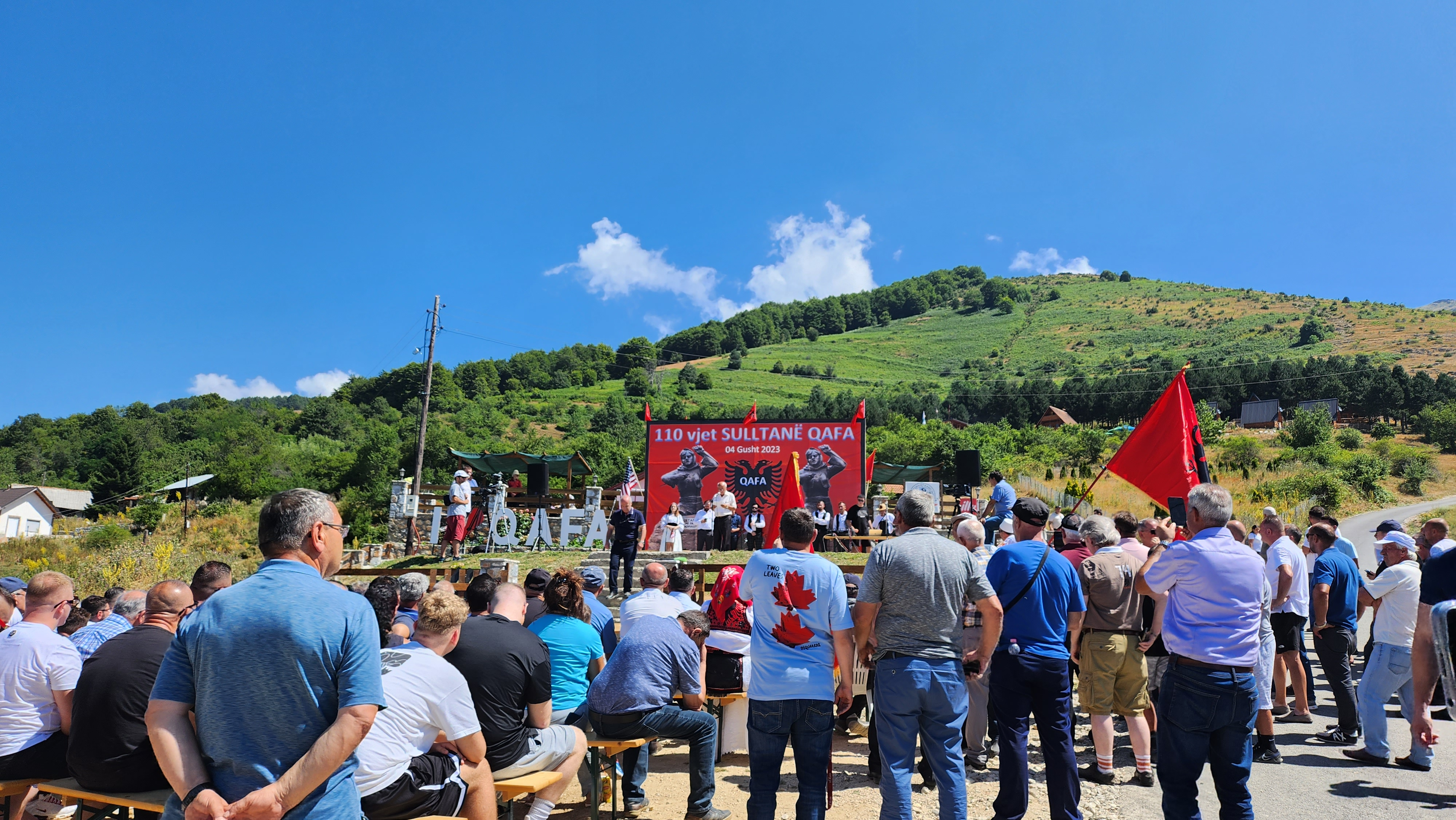
Festival held in Qafa for the 110 year anniversary of the death of Sulltana Qafa.

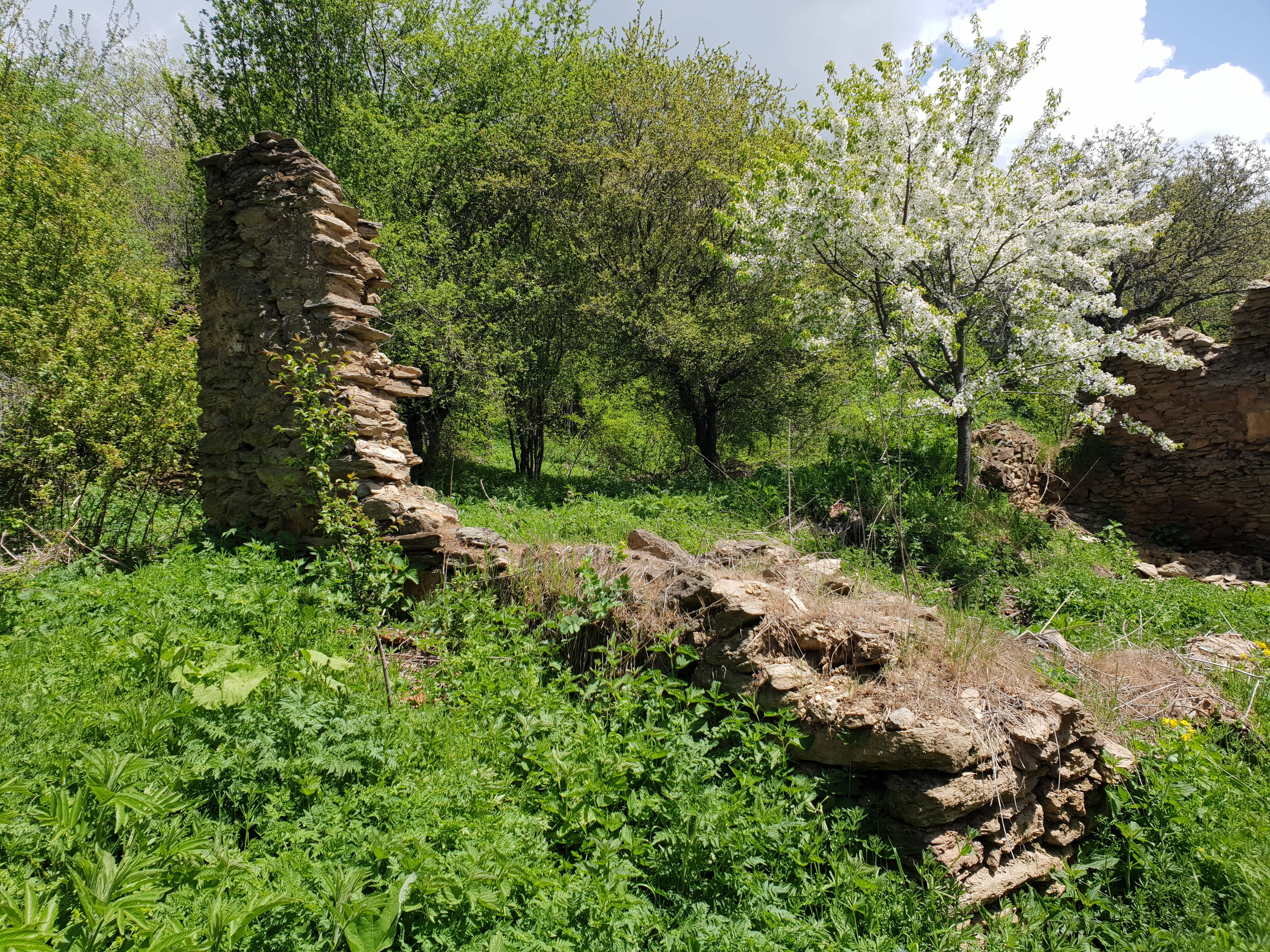
Ruins of old houses are scattered all around the village.

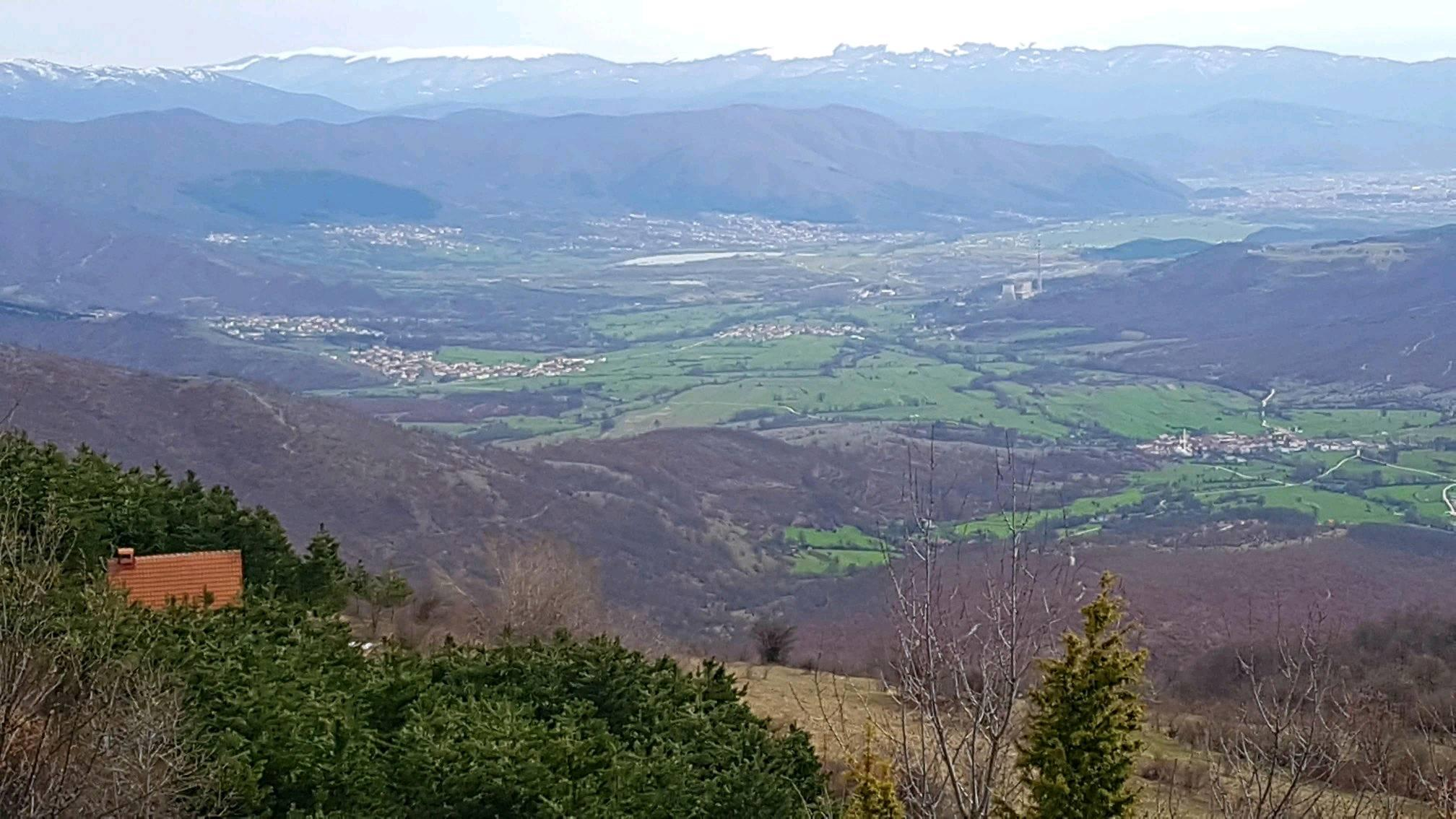
View of the city of Kičevo (far right) and surrounding villages, from Qafa.
