= Bahmanshir-e Shomali Rural District =

Rural district in Khuzestan province, Iran

Bahmanshir-e Shomali Rural District Persian: دهستان بهمنشير شمالي
- Rural District
- Location within Iran
- Coordinates: 30°23′30″N 48°19′30″E
- Country: Iran
- Province: Khuzestan
- County: Abadan
- District: Central
- Capital: Albuebadi

Population (2016)
  - Total: 5,306
- Time zone: UTC+3:30 (IRST)

Bahmanshir-e Shomali Rural District (Persian: دهستان بهمنشير شمالي) is in the Central District of Abadan County, Khuzestan province, Iran. Its capital is the village of Albuebadi. The previous capital of the rural district was the village of Salih-ye Sharqi (سلیح شرقی).

== Demographics ==
=== Population ===
At the time of the 2006 National Census, the rural district's population was 4,017 in 695 households. There were 4,977 inhabitants in 1,225 households at the following census of 2011. The 2016 census measured the population of the rural district as 5,306 in 1,452 households. The most populous of its 19 villages was Fayazi, with 2,225 people.
