= Bahmanshir-e Jonubi Rural District =

Rural district in Khuzestan province, Iran

Bahmanshir-e Jonubi Rural District Persian: دهستان بهمنشير جنوبي
- Rural District
- Location within Iran
- Coordinates: 30°12′43″N 48°42′28″E
- Country: Iran
- Province: Khuzestan
- County: Abadan
- District: Central
- Capital: Abu Shanak

Population (2016)
  - Total: 9,943
- Time zone: UTC+3:30 (IRST)

Bahmanshir-e Jonubi Rural District (Persian: دهستان بهمنشير جنوبي) is in the Central District of Abadan County, Khuzestan province, Iran. Its capital is the village of Abu Shanak.

== Demographics ==
=== Population ===
At the time of the 2006 National Census, the rural district's population was 8,812 in 1,614 households. There were 8,189 inhabitants in 1,970 households at the following census of 2011. The 2016 census measured the population of the rural district as 9,943 in 2,793 households. The most populous of its 17 villages was Tangeh-ye Yek, with 3,119 people.
