= Shalahi Rural District =

Rural district in Khuzestan province, Iran

Shalahi Rural District Persian: دهستان شلاهی
- Rural District
- Location within Iran
- Coordinates: 30°14′14″N 48°27′30″E
- Country: Iran
- Province: Khuzestan
- County: Abadan
- District: Central
- Capital: Savamar

Population (2016)
  - Total: 15,991
- Time zone: UTC+3:30 (IRST)

Shalahi Rural District (Persian: دهستان شلاهی) is in the Central District of Abadan County, Khuzestan province, Iran. Its capital is the village of Savamar.

== Demographics ==
=== Population ===
At the time of the 2006 National Census, the rural district's population was 19,299 in 3,570 households. There were 14,111 inhabitants in 3,617 households at the following census of 2011. The 2016 census measured the population of the rural district as 15,991 in 4,406 households. The most populous of its 25 villages was Ramileh, with 2,986 people.
