= Central District (Abadan County) =

District in Khuzestan province, Iran

Central District (Abadan County) Persian: بخش مرکزی شهرستان آبادان
- District
- Location within Iran
- Coordinates: 30°15′44″N 48°38′15″E
- Country: Iran
- Province: Khuzestan
- County: Abadan
- Capital: Abadan

Population (2016)
  - Total: 270,622
- Time zone: UTC+3:30 (IRST)

The Central District of Abadan County (Persian: بخش مرکزی شهرستان آبادان) is in Khuzestan province, Iran. Its capital is the city of Abadan.

== History ==
After the 2011 National Census, the village of Chavibdeh was elevated to the status of a city.

== Demographics ==
=== Population ===
At the time of the 2006 census, the district's population was 250,116 in 53,940 households. The following census in 2011 counted 247,273 people in 63,829 households. The 2016 census measured the population of the district as 270,622 inhabitants in 72,221 households.

=== Administrative divisions ===
Central District (Abadan County) Population
Administrative Divisions	2006	2011	2016
Bahmanshir-e Jonubi RD	8,812	8,189	9,943
Bahmanshir-e Shomali RD	4,017	4,977	5,306
Shalahi RD	19,299	14,111	15,991
Abadan (city)	217,988	212,744	231,476
Chavibdeh (city)		7,252	7,906
Total	250,116	247,273	270,622
RD = Rural District
