= International Exhibition of Calligraphy =

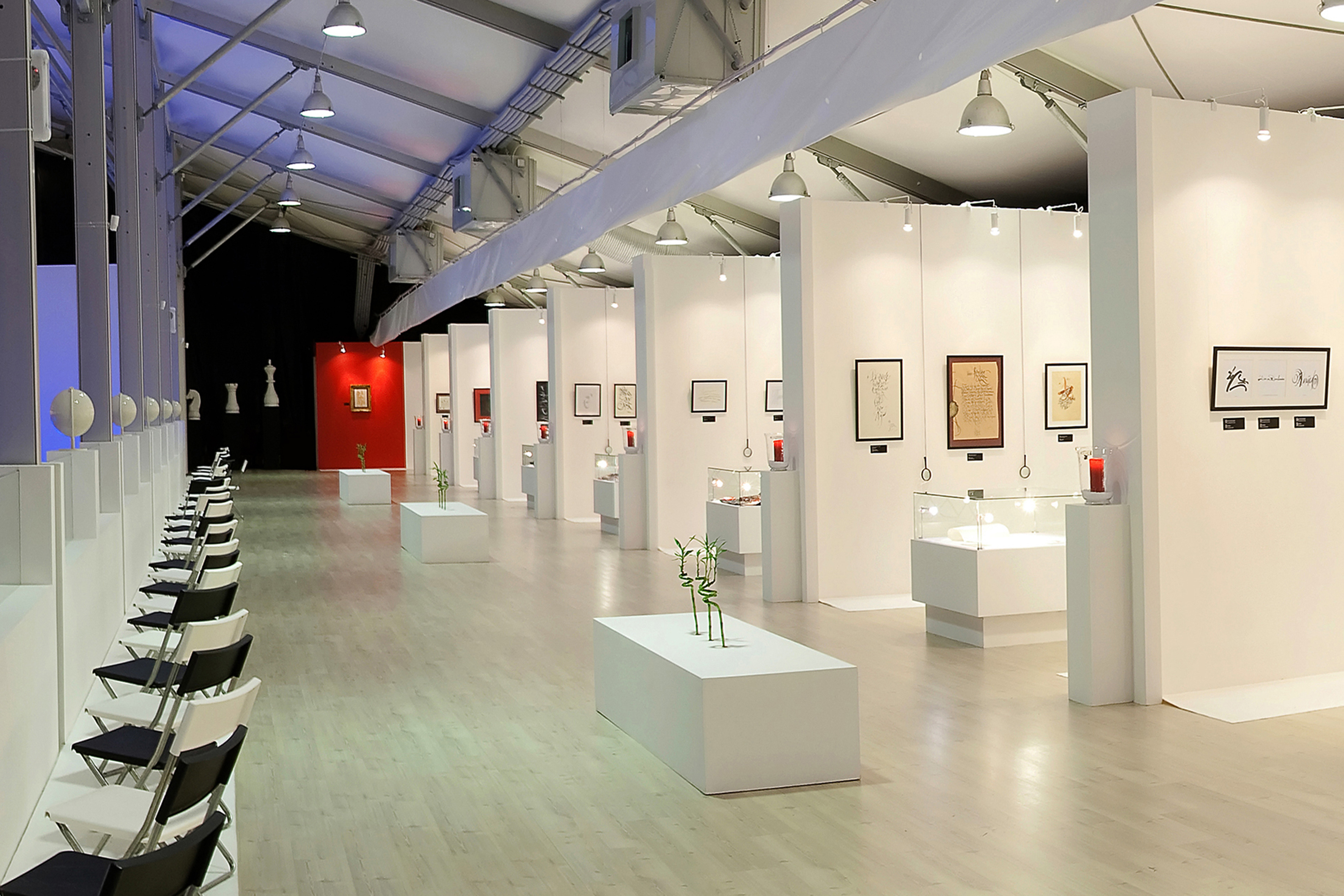
- Country: Russia
- Location: Moscow, St. Petersburg, Veliky Novgorod
- Opened: 2008
- Curator: Alexey Shaburov
- Organiser: Contemporary museum of calligraphy

The International Exhibition of Calligraphy (Russian: Междунаро́дная вы́ставка каллигра́фии) is a project organized by The Contemporary Museum of Calligraphy, with the support of the National Union of Calligraphers and the Sokolniki Exhibition and Convention Centre. The project's aim is to promote the art of calligraphy and highlight its educational significance through exhibitions and festivals.

== About ==
Calligraphy is the art of giving form to signs in an expressive, harmonious and skillful manner (Mediavilla 1996: 18).

The project began in 2008 under the leadership of Alexey Shaburov, the president of the Sokolniki Exhibition and Convention Centre. Within just a few months, many renowned calligraphers and designers joined the project. Among these were Pyotr Chobitko, Evgeny Dobrovinsky, Leonid Proneko, Pavel Semchenko, Ilya Bogdesko, and Nikolay Taranov.

== Participants ==
Over the years of the project's existence, it has featured works by renowned calligraphers from the following countries: Australia, Argentina, Armenia, Belarus, Belgium, Bulgaria, Brazil, Great Britain, Hungary, Germany, Hong Kong, Greece, Georgia, Israel, India, Jordan, Morocco, the Netherlands, Norway, Pakistan, Palestine, Peru, Poland, Russia, Serbia, Syria, Slovenia, United States, Taiwan, Tunisia, Turkey, Uzbekistan, Ukraine, Finland, France, Montenegro, Czech Republic, Ethiopia, United Arab Emirates, and South Africa.

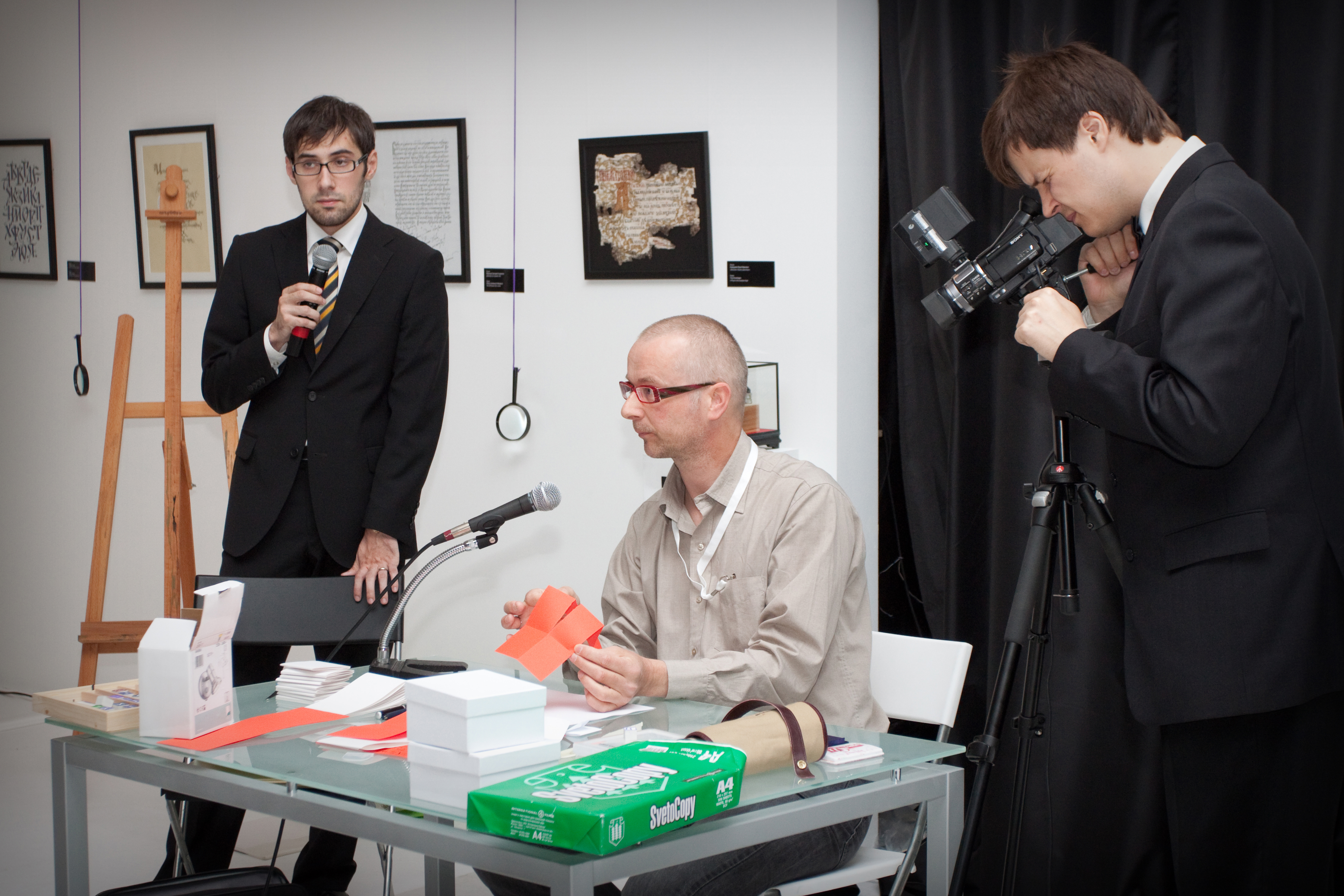
Bas Vlam, Norway

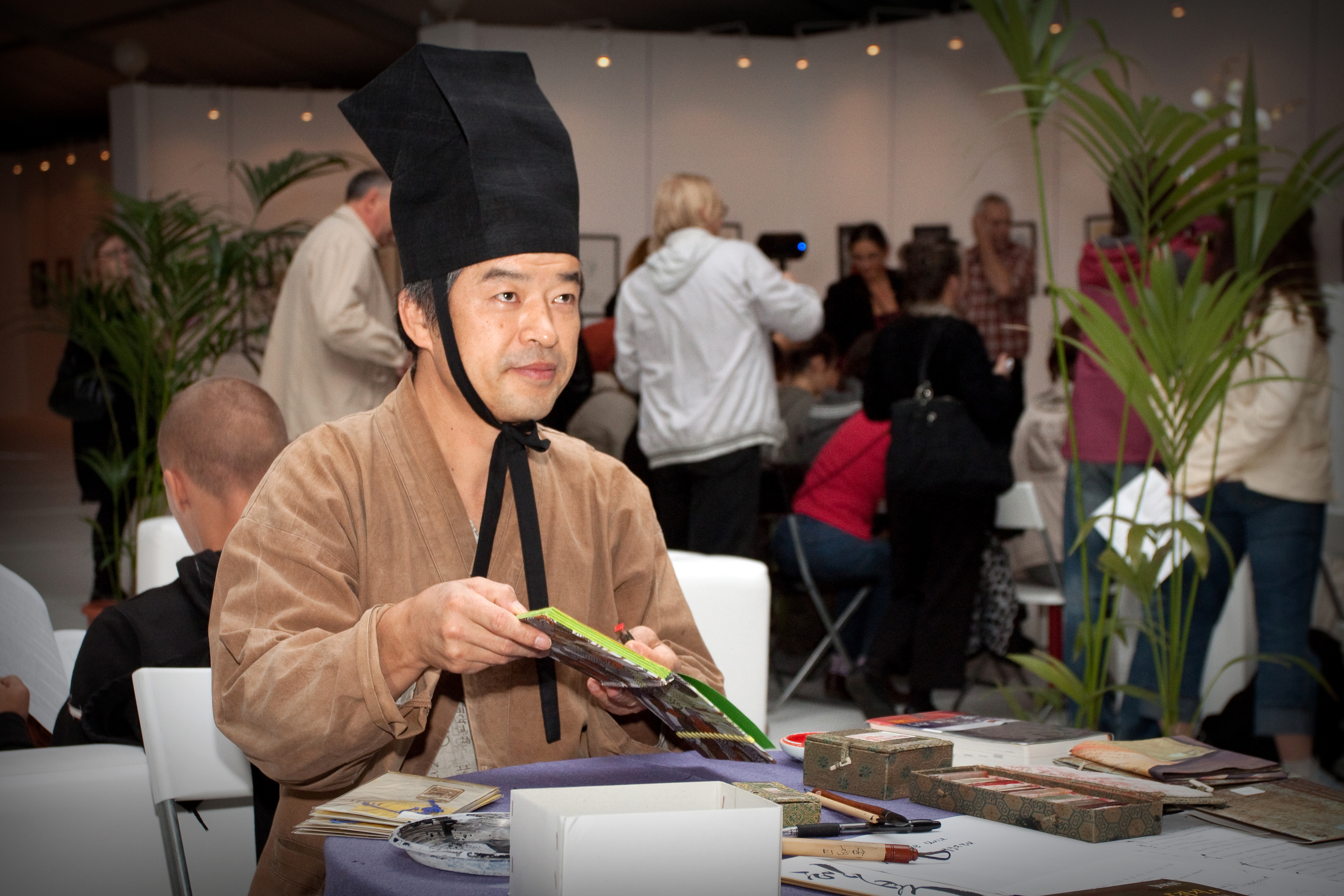
Kim Jong Chil, Korea

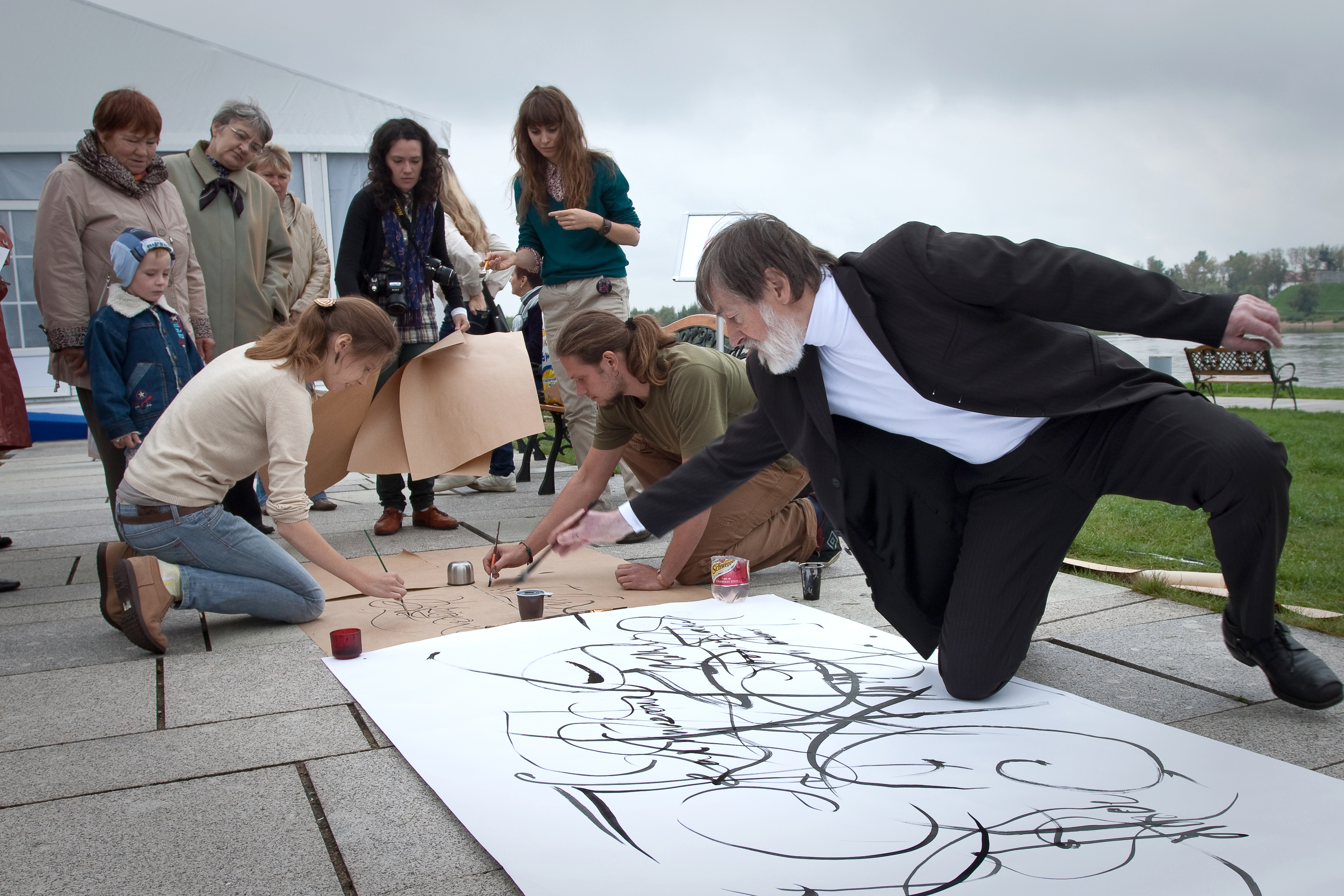
Petr Chobitko, Russia

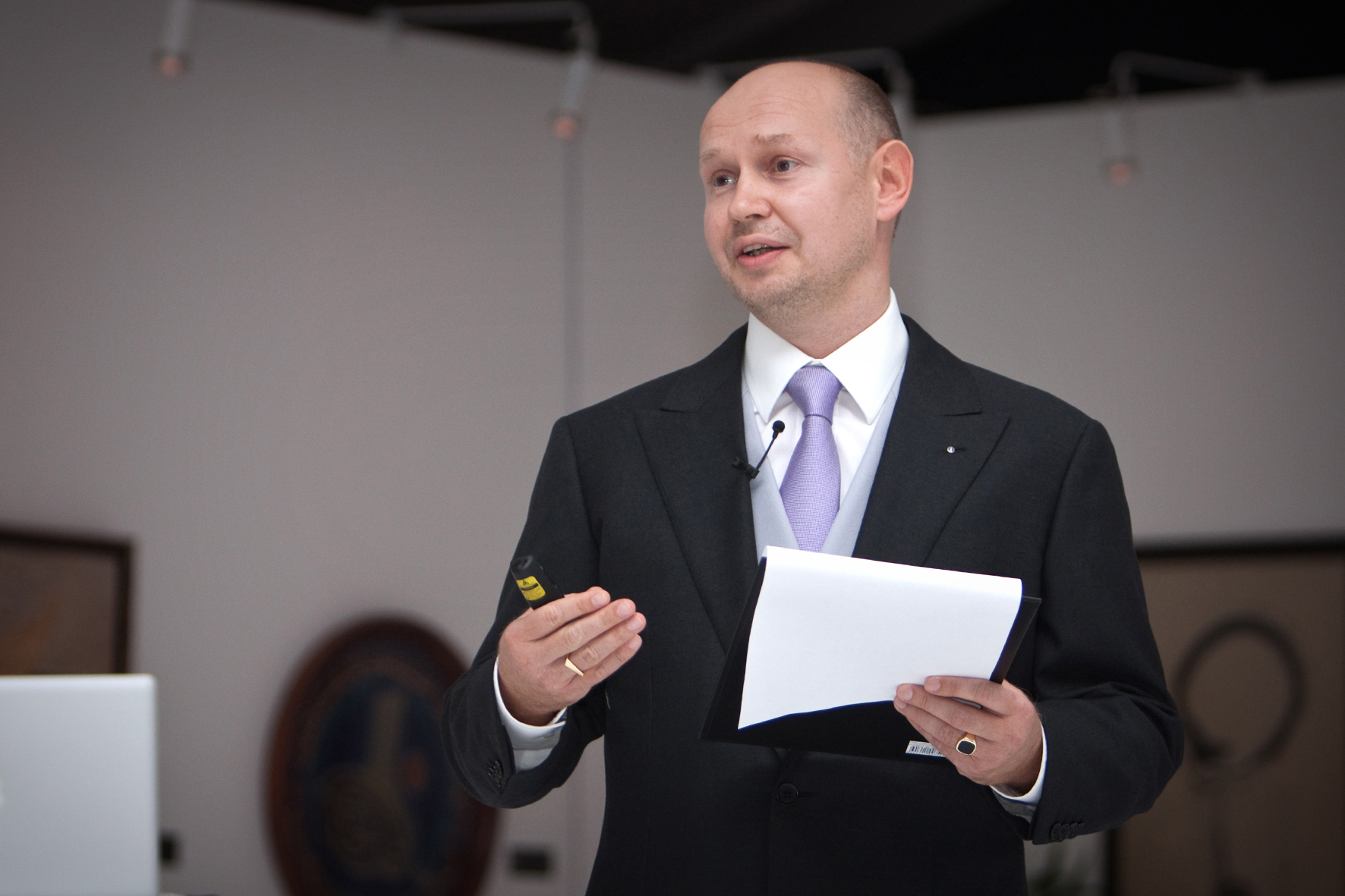
Alexey Shaburov, director of the project

== Exhibitions ==
=== First International Exhibition of Calligraphy ===
The I.E. Repin State Institute of Painting, Sculpture, and Architecture hosted the first International Exhibition of Calligraphy on September 16–21, 2008. On the first day, more than 500 people had arrived to the exhibition site before the doors even opened. 480 works from 26 states were presented. In total, over 700 works were displayed in the exhibition.

More than 20 lectures and workshops, by Russian and foreign artists, were held during the five days of the exhibition, which was attended by 40 renowned Russian and international calligraphers.

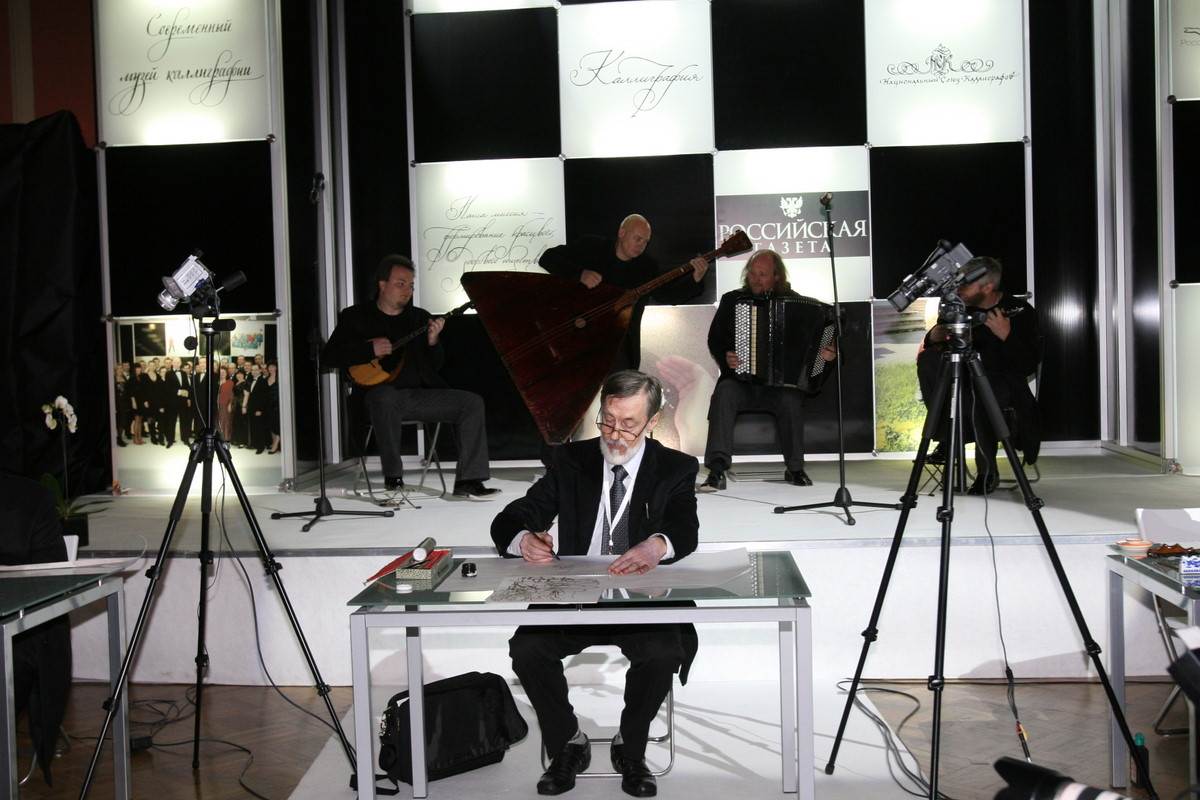
Calligrapher Petr Chobitko at the opening ceremony of the I International Exhibition of Calligraphy

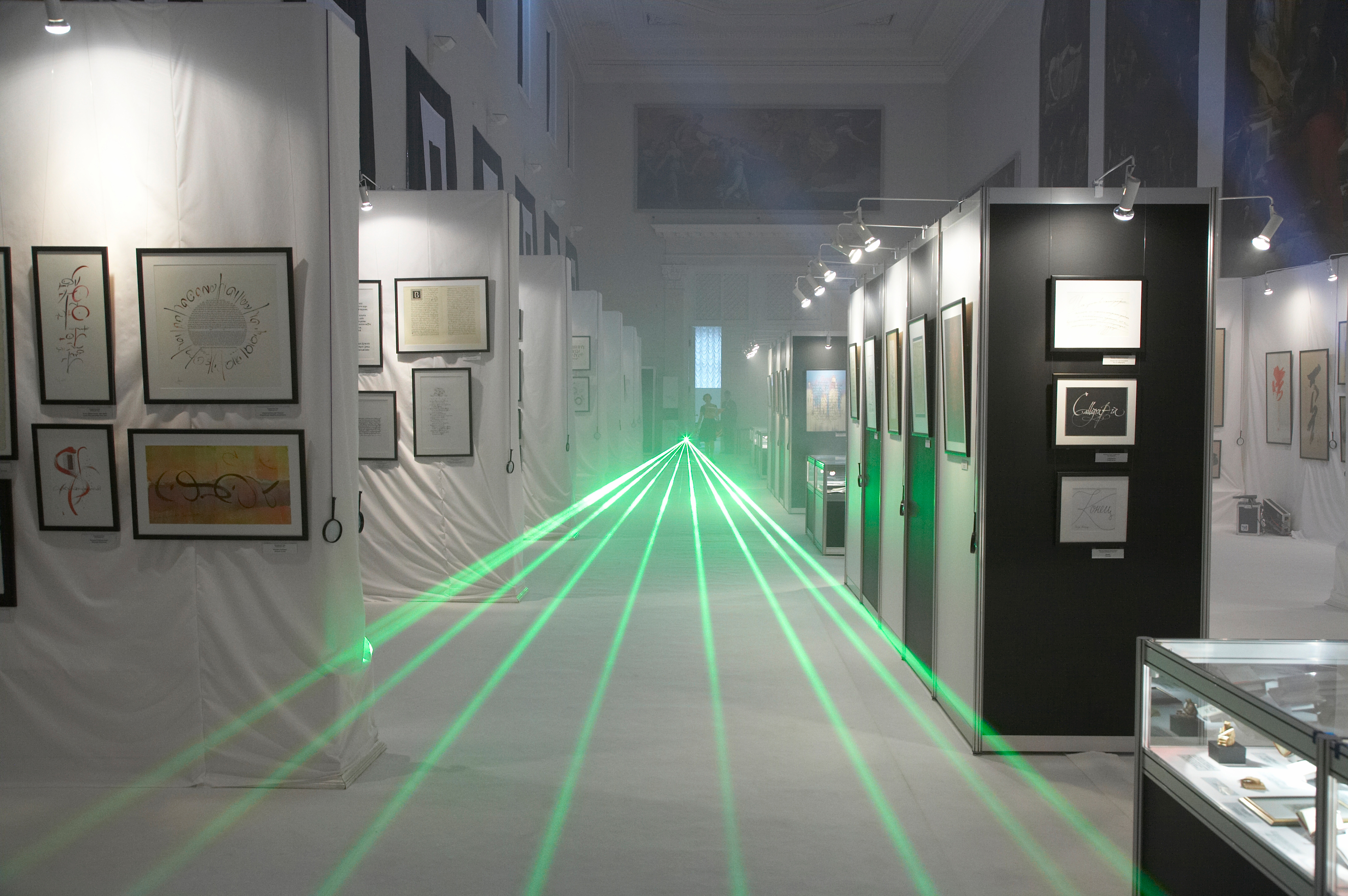
Exposition in the Repin State Academic Institute

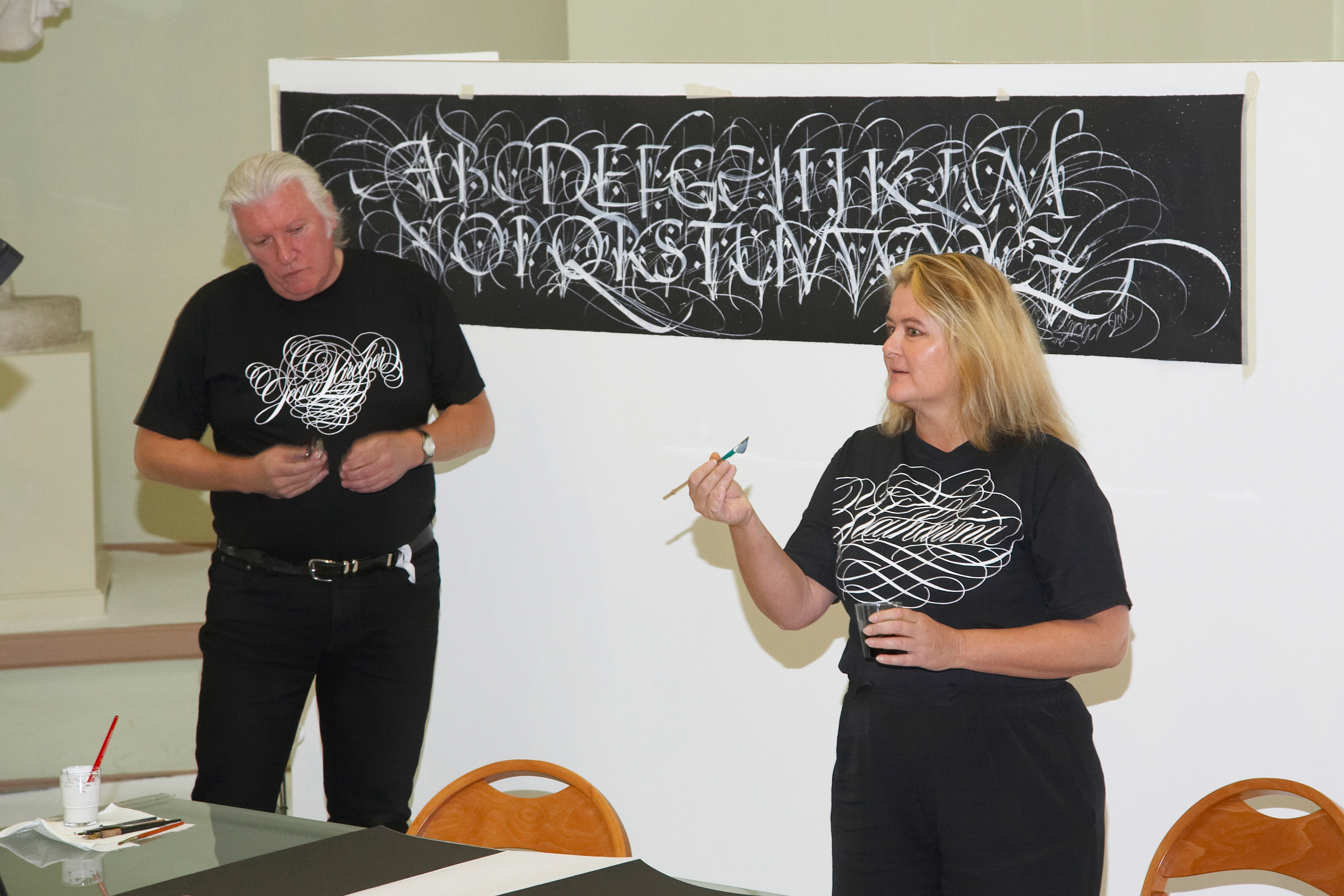
German Calligraphers Jean Larcher and Katharina Pieper giving a workshop

=== Mysteries of World Calligraphy (special exhibition) ===
On December 9–14, 2008, the Contemporary Museum of Calligraphy held the special exhibit Mysteries of World Calligraphy, which was dedicated to the Constitution Day of the Russian Federation. To launch this exhibit was the arrival of a new item: the Handwritten Constitution of the Russian Federation, the first of its kind in the Post-Soviet Russia. This A2-sized work was created in five months by Pyotr Chobitko, chairman of the National Union of Calligraphers. He completed the work by himself, with the exception of the ruling of the sheets.

The exhibition featured several workshops and lectures by Russian and international artists.

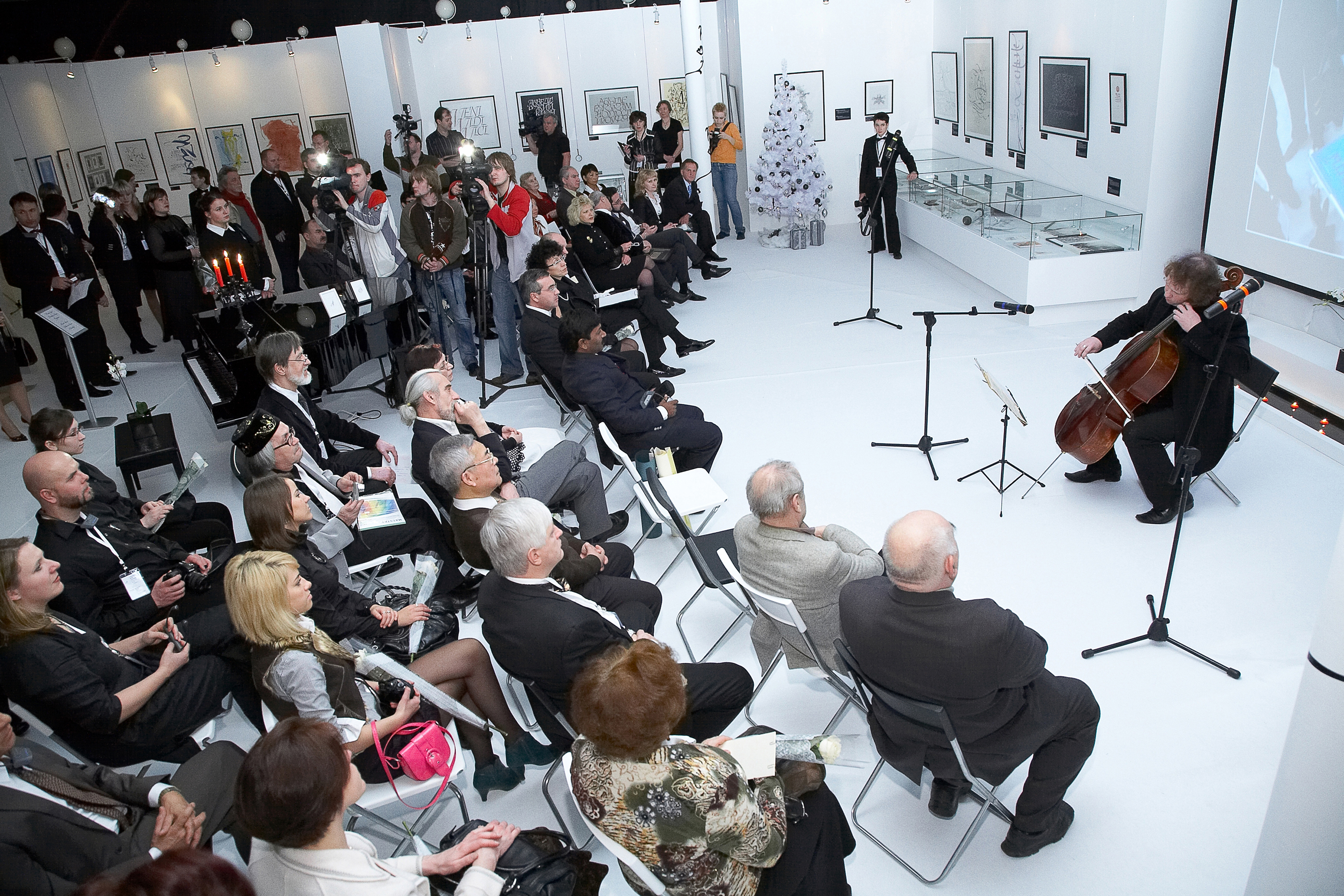
Opening ceremony of the Mysteries of World Calligraphy exhibition

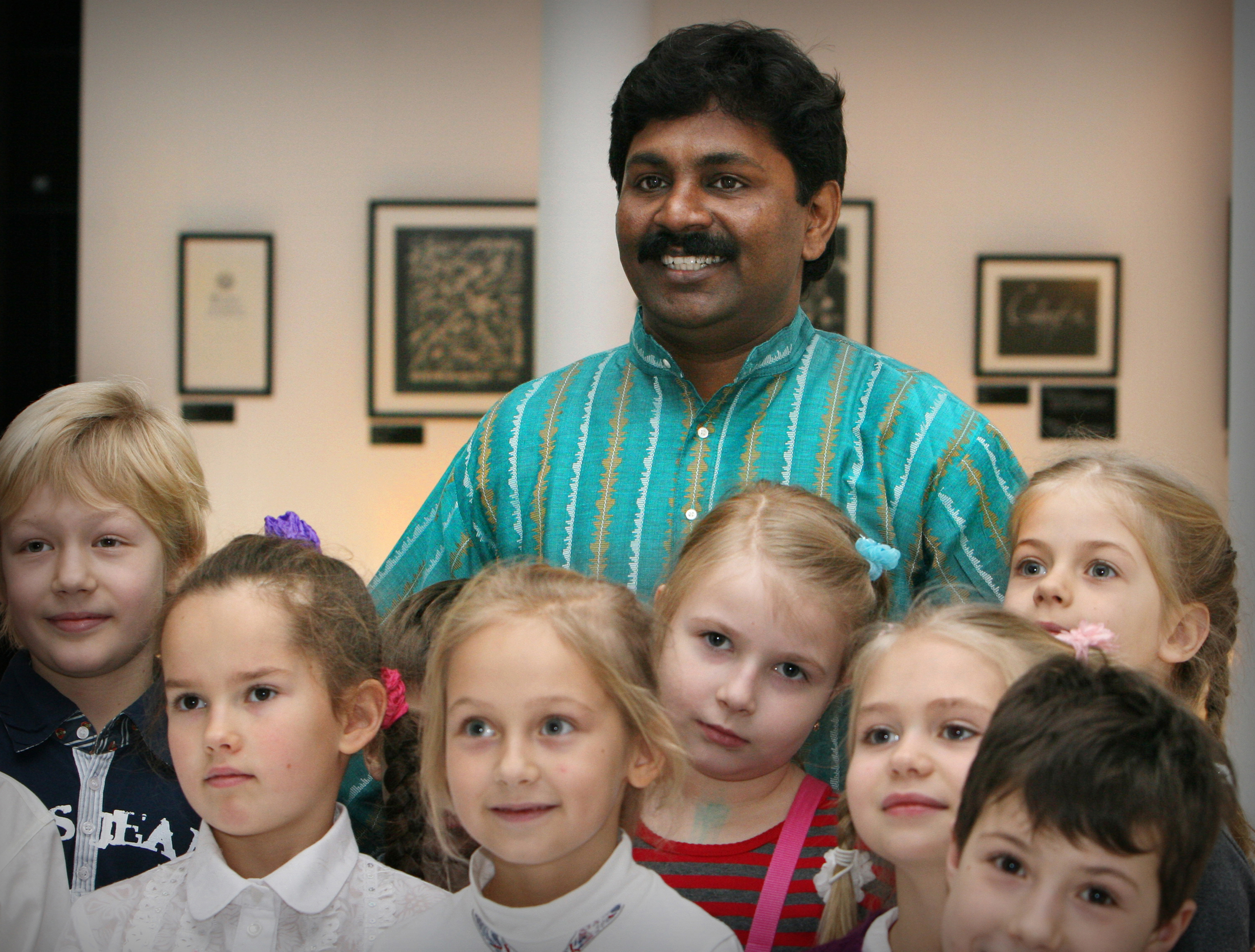
Indian calligrapher Manohar Desai

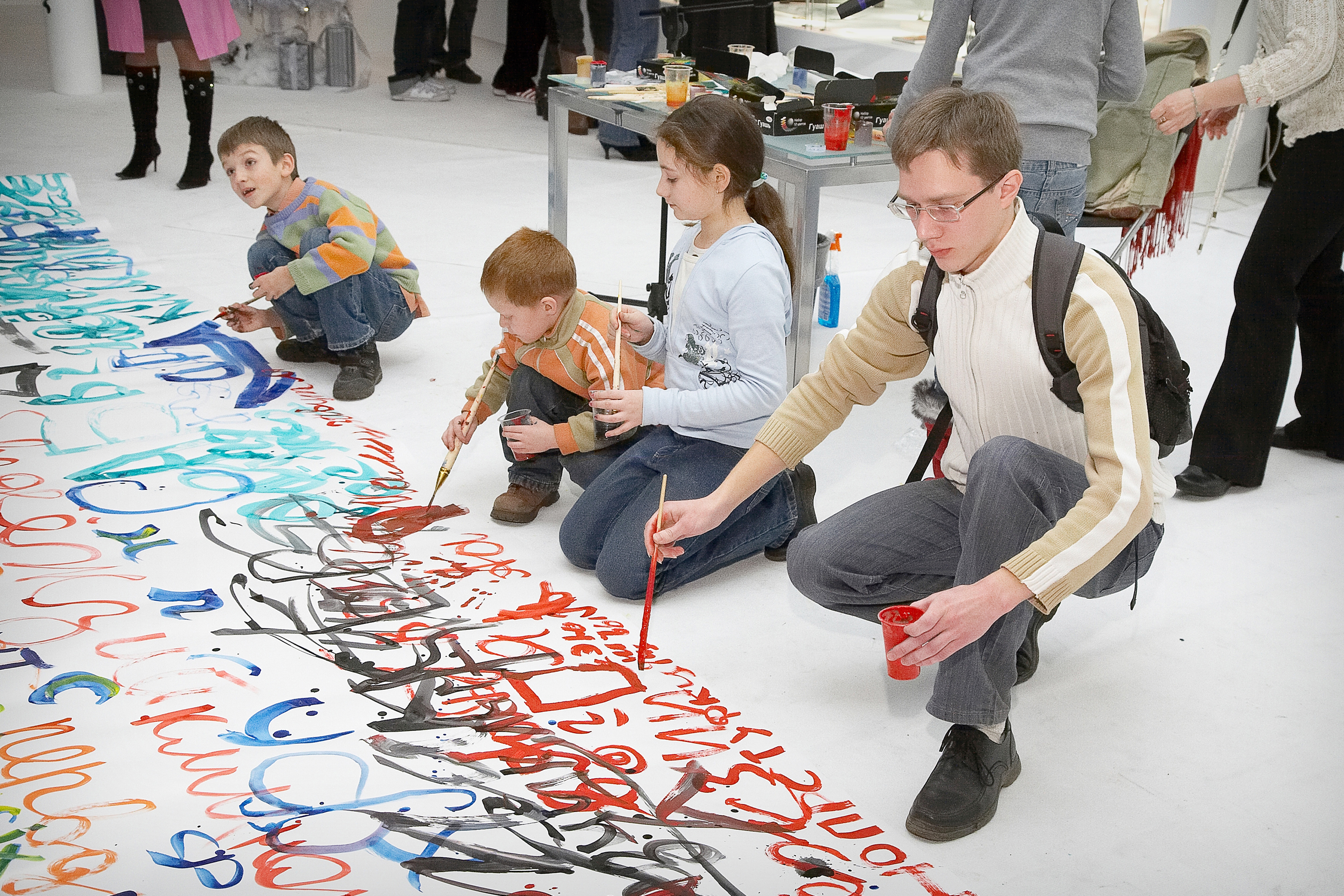
One of the workshops for kids

=== Second International Exhibition of Calligraphy ===
On October 14 – November 14, 2009, the Second International Exhibition of Calligraphy took place at the Sokolniki Exhibition and Convention Centre, which afforded a total exhibition area of 5,000 square metres (54,000 sq ft). It was held under the auspices of the Commission of the Russian Federation for UNESCO with the support of the Ministry of Culture of the Russian Federation. This exhibition received The Global Association of the Exhibition Industry's approval for the highly professional level of exhibition organization. In 2010, the exhibition reached the final three of the exhibitions World Cup, according to Exhibition News Awards (London).

The event featured 72 workshops offered by the leading calligraphy masters of the world, among them

- Barbara Calzolari, who has worked for Pope Benedict XVI and G8 leaders;
- Evgeny Drobyazin, author of the calligraphic text of the National Anthem of Russia which Silvio Berlusconi presented to the then President Dmitry Medvedev during the G8 summit in L'Aquila;
- Nja Mahdaoui, winner of numerous art contests, member of the UNESCO international jury on art awards distribution;
- Pyotr Chobitko, chairman of the National Union of Calligraphers;
- Massimo Polello, president of the Guild of Calligraphers of Turin;
- Other renowned calligraphers from Russia, Ukraine, Belarus, Israel, Italy, France, Tunisia, China, and Serbia.

Unique pieces premiered at the exhibition:

- Tsar Mezuzah – which was in The Guinness Book of World Records;
- the Sacred Calligraphy collection;
- a calligraphy scroll 30 metres (98 ft) long;
- a 4.5 metres (15 ft) long carpet decorated with Arabic writings woven into it;
- birch-bark manuscripts, pergamens (parchments), Chinese and Korean scrolls;
- Decalogue – a calligraphy book unique in design and complexity.
- The framework of the exhibition also featured the "From the Earth to the Universe" project, representing a collection of unique photographs of the vast depths of space.
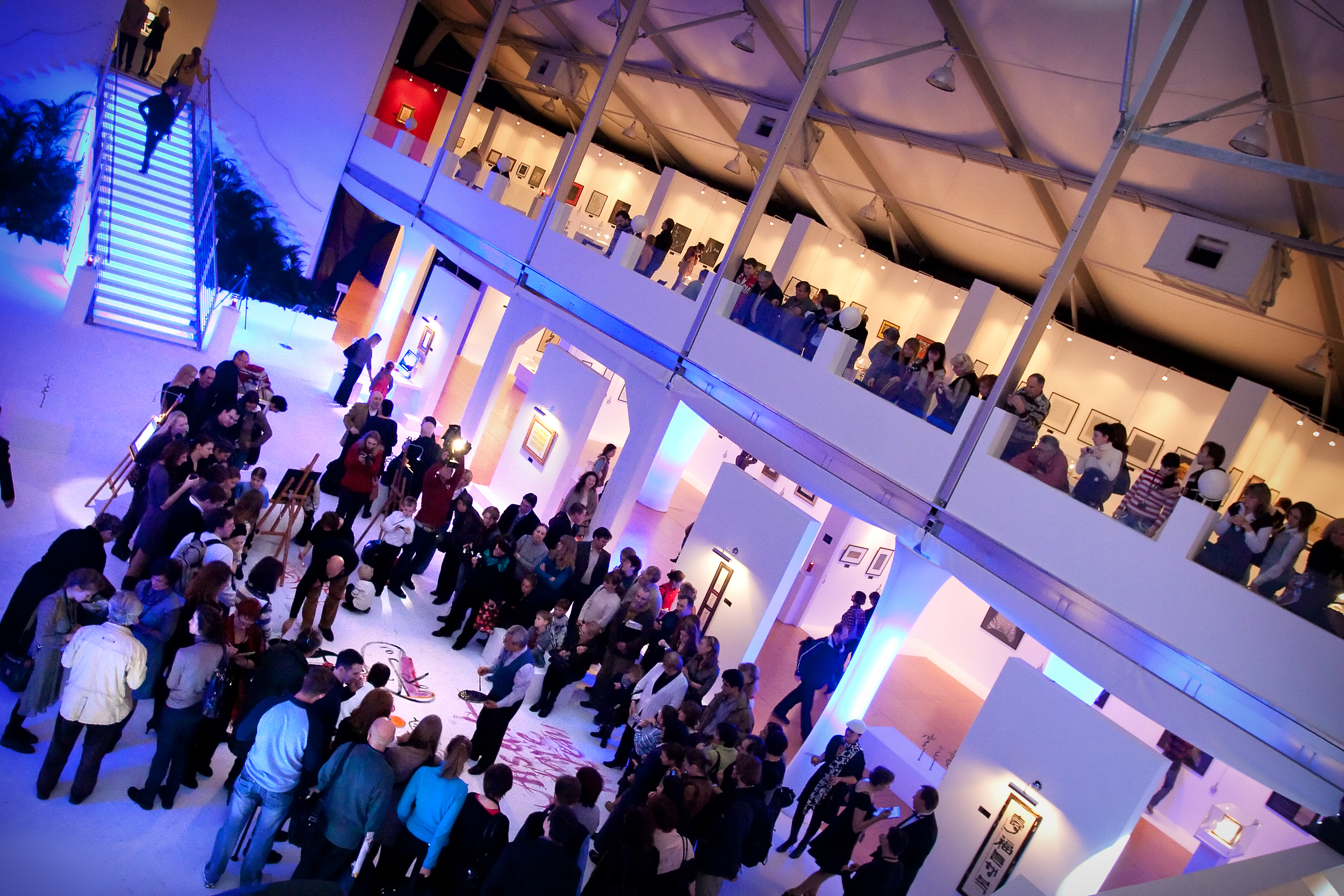
II International exhibition of calligraphy, the main hall

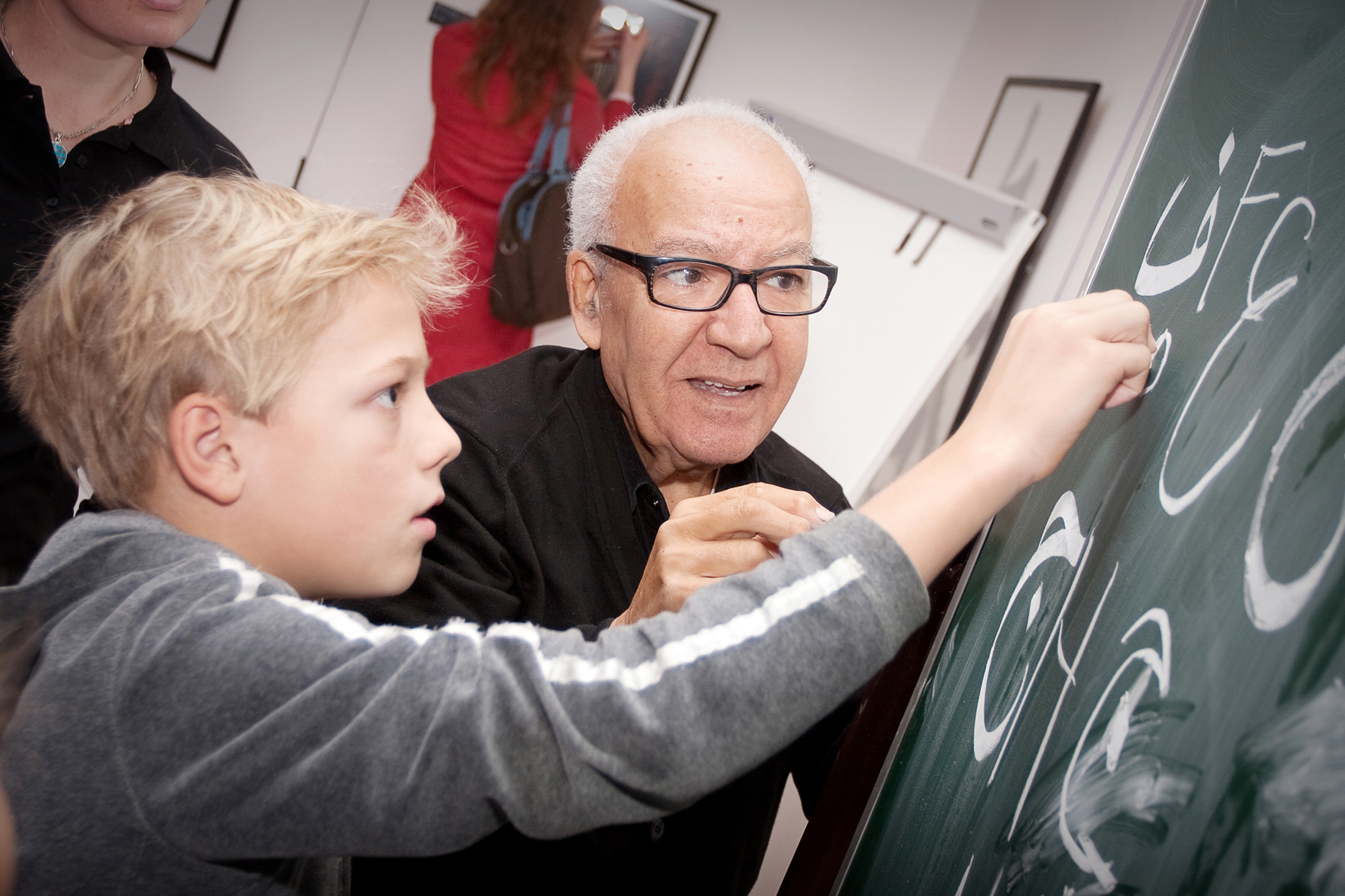
.II International exhibition of calligraphy, calligrapher from Tunisia Nja Mahdaoui

=== Third International Exhibition of Calligraphy ===
On September 10–12, 2010, the Third International Exhibition of Calligraphy was held in Veliky Novgorod. Its venue was a specially built mobile pavilion erected in the city's historic centre, in Yaroslav's Court near the city Kremlin. The project's unique feature was that the event was the first ever large-scale travelling exhibition of a current International Council of Museums (ICOM) member. The exhibition received the approval of the Russian Union of Exhibitions and Fairs (RUEF) for its highly professional level of organization.

A team of 91 from the Contemporary Museum of Calligraphy and the MVK International Exhibition Company came from Moscow to prepare the exhibition. 19 trucks with 136 tons of equipment and exhibits travelled from Moscow to Novgorod. Over the three days of the event, 46 workshops were held. In total, 35 renowned calligraphy artists took part in the exhibition. Novgorod residents had a chance to see over 300 calligraphy exhibits, including some listed in the Guinness Book of World Records. Over 37,000 visitors attended the event over the three days.

For the first time a wakeboarding tournament for WakeWorld Russia Cup took place within the Exhibition, with the best professional riders from Russia, Europe, and Asia. The Museum Night project was also held in cooperation with the Novgorod State United Museum-Reserve.

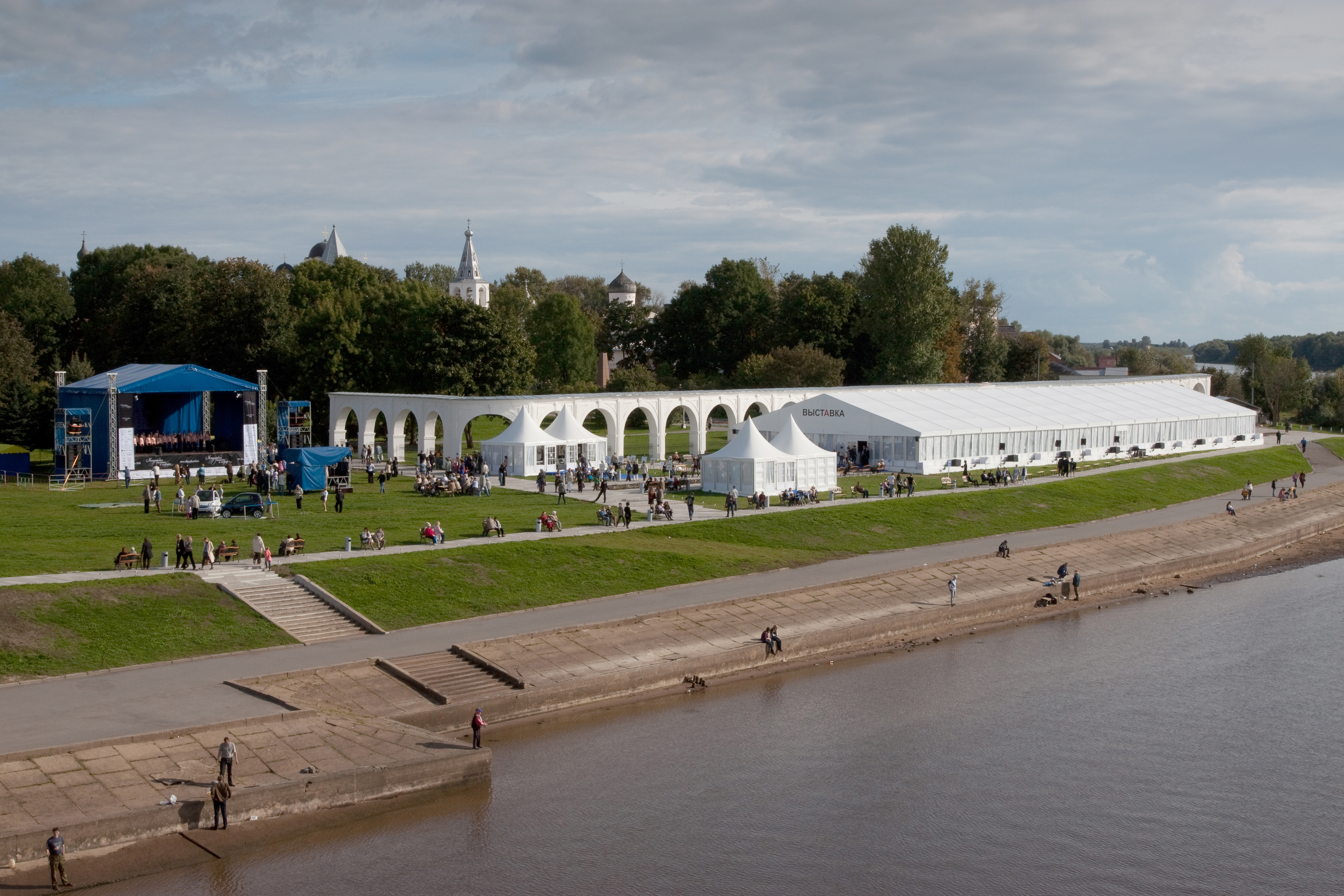
III International exhibition of calligraphy, exhibition pavilion on the bank of the Volkhov river

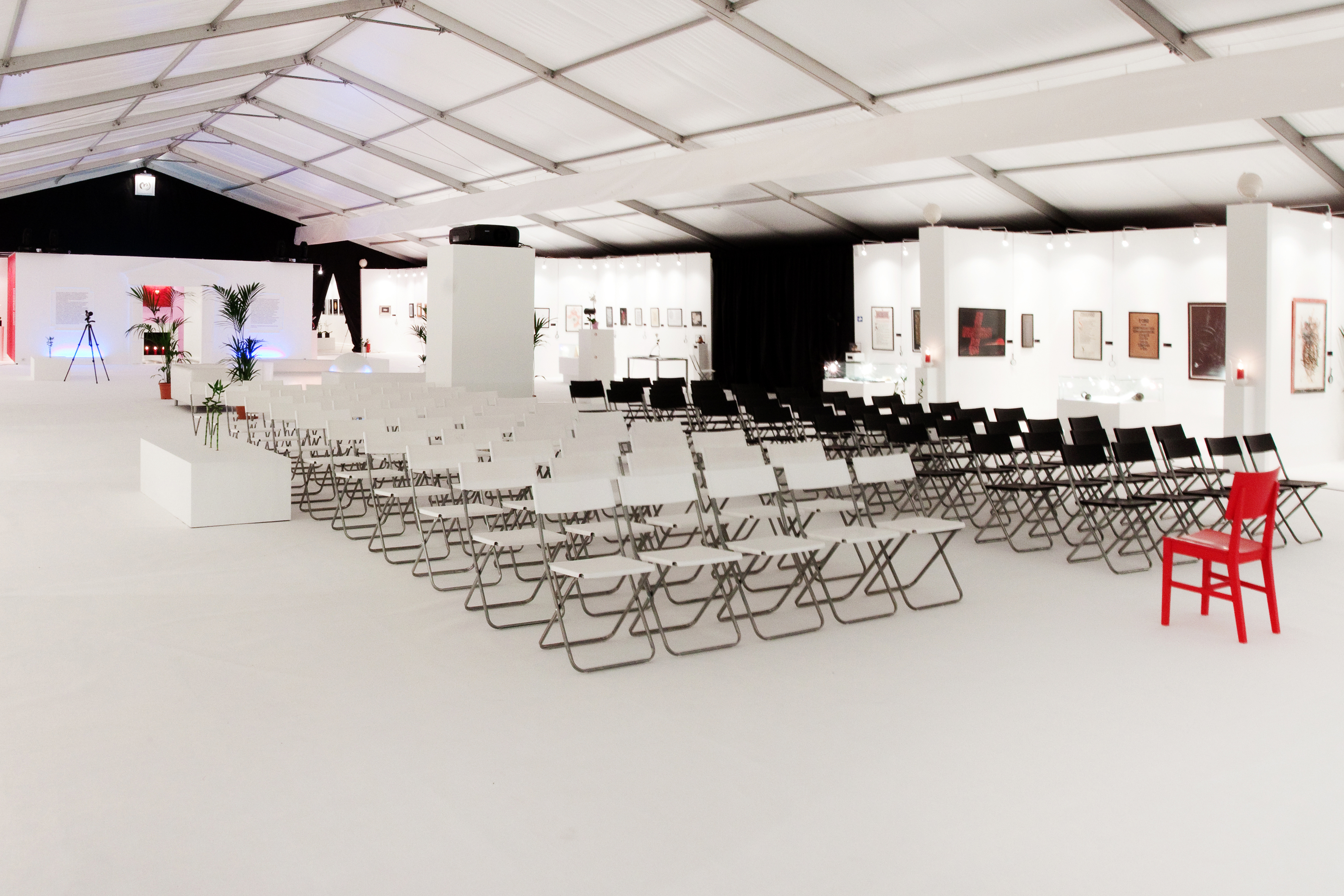
III International exhibition of calligraphy, exhibition hall

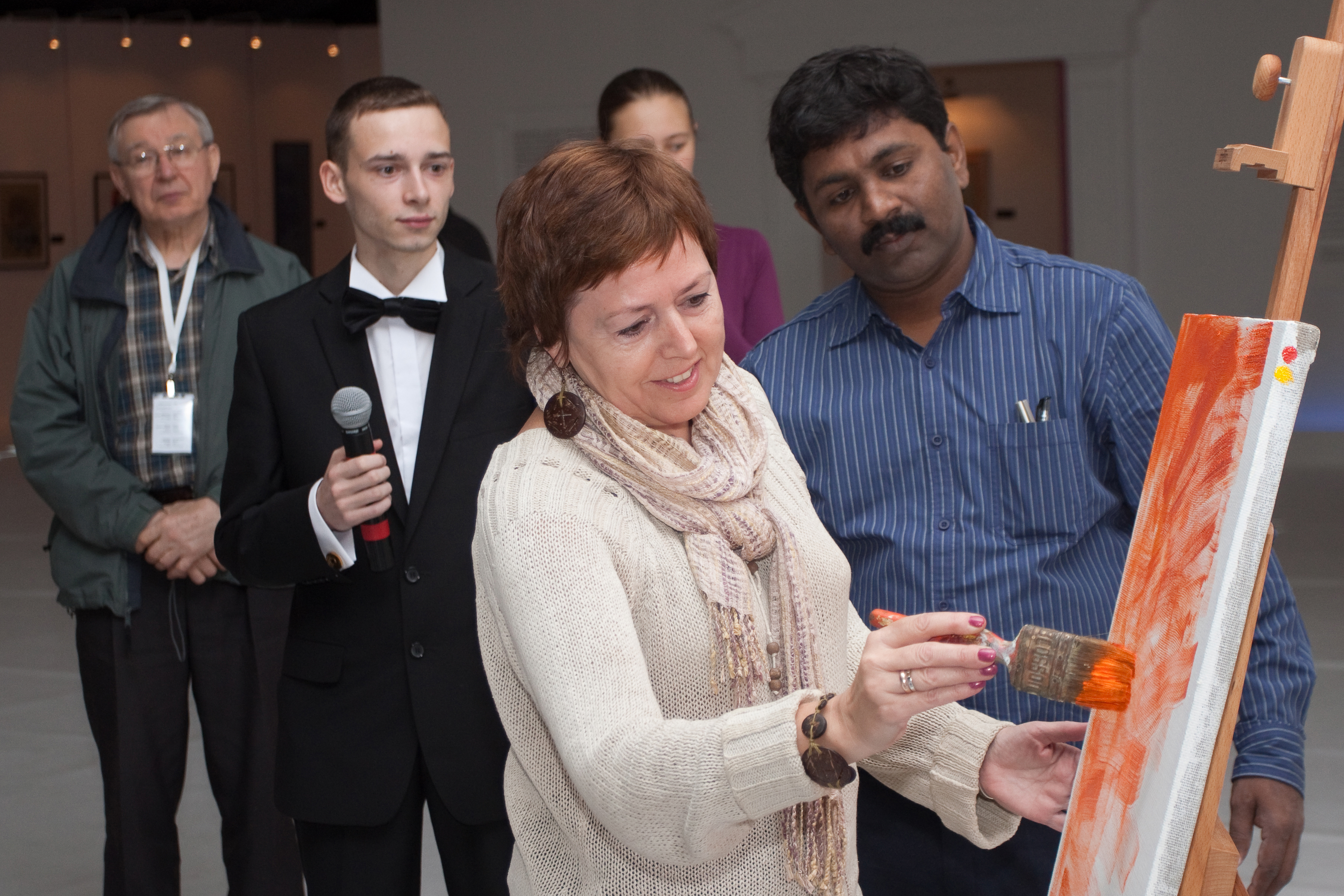
III International exhibition of calligraphy, every visitor had a chance to try his hand

=== Fourth International Exhibition of Calligraphy ===
On November 1 – December 15, 2012, the Fourth International Exhibition of Calligraphy was held at the Contemporary museum of calligraphy.

10 new authors from European and Eastern countries with their distinct styles and personalities took part in the exhibition. Valerian Bakharev's "I Ching Signs", consisting of 64 hexagrammic paintings, became the symbol of the exposition.

The program included lectures and workshops for both adults and children.

=== Fifth International Exhibition of Calligraphy ===
On March 14 through April 12, 2015, the Fifth International Exhibition of Calligraphy was held in Moscow. The anniversary event boasted a record number of participants: 90 artists from 52 countries who presented 201 calligraphic artworks. The theme of the exposition was "Reflections on the Motherland".

One of the unique pieces presented at the exhibition was the handwritten Gospel of Mark created by the Russian artist Apollinariya Mishina. The book contains a series of illustrations on 155 pages, 104 of which are miniatures made by a colour etching technique and illuminated with gold leaf. This piece was highly praised by the Russian Orthodox Church.

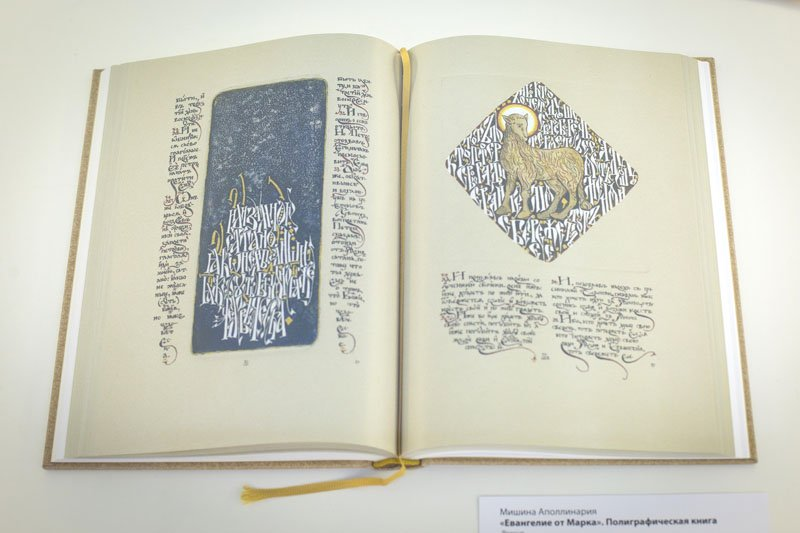
It took Apollinaria Mishina 5 years to create this Gospel of Mark.

=== Sixth International Exhibition of Calligraphy ===
On September 1 to 10, 2018, the Sixth International Exhibition of Calligraphy was held in Sokolniki Park, Moscow, in an exhibit hall custom built for the project. The exhibition featured over 350 masterpieces by 150 artists from more than 60 countries.

The exhibit featured both traditional and uncommon calligraphy styles. Mongolian calligraphy was shown for the first time – along with European, Slavonic, Arabic, Hebrew, Chinese, Japanese, Korean and Indian calligraphy – as members of the International Association of Mongolian Calligraphy took part in the exhibition, and their art aroused keen interest.

Many handwritten books were exhibited, such as the handwritten Constitution of the Russian Federation, which is one of the major items in the museum's collection, and original art books varying from handmade pages of the Russian ABC Book illustrated by Marina Khankova to illuminated sheets of The Saint John's Bible by Donald Jackson.

A highlight on the guest list was Timothy Noad, scribe and illuminator to the Crown Office in Chancery and a heraldry and illumination artist. He is renowned for his Royal Charters and coin designs.

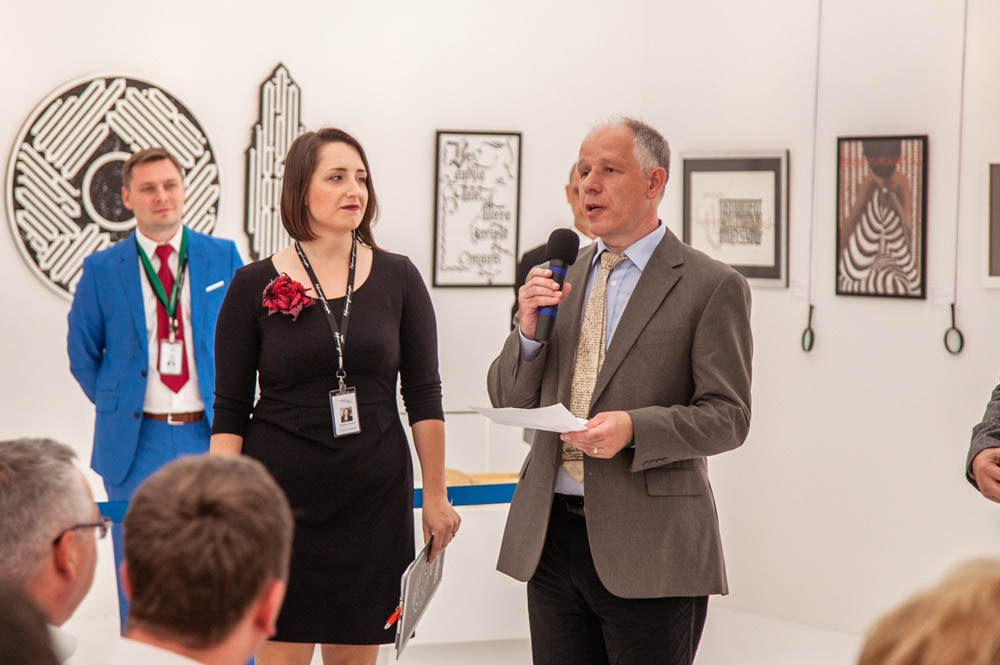
Timothy Noad, Scribe and Illuminator to Her Majesty's Crown Office

== Project's development ==
=== National Union of Calligraphers ===
On May 14, 2008, the National Union of Calligraphers was established at the International Exhibition of Calligraphy. The handwritten charter, with many famous Russian calligraphers' signatures, testifies to the Union's birth. Under the Charter, the Union aims at the revival of the art of calligraphy in Russia, creating conditions for its development, and admitting everybody who is willing to learn the beauty of writing. Petr Chobitko was elected Chairman of the Union with Alexey Shaburov as its president.

The Union's masterpiece is the Handwritten Constitution of the Russian Federation, scribed by Pyotr Chobitko. It is stored at the Contemporary Museum of Calligraphy. Miniature copies have been prepared as gift editions.

== See also ==
- Writing system
