= Sokolniki Exhibition and Convention Centre =

Exhibition and conference venue in Moscow, Russia

Coordinates: 55°47′57″N 37°40′28″E

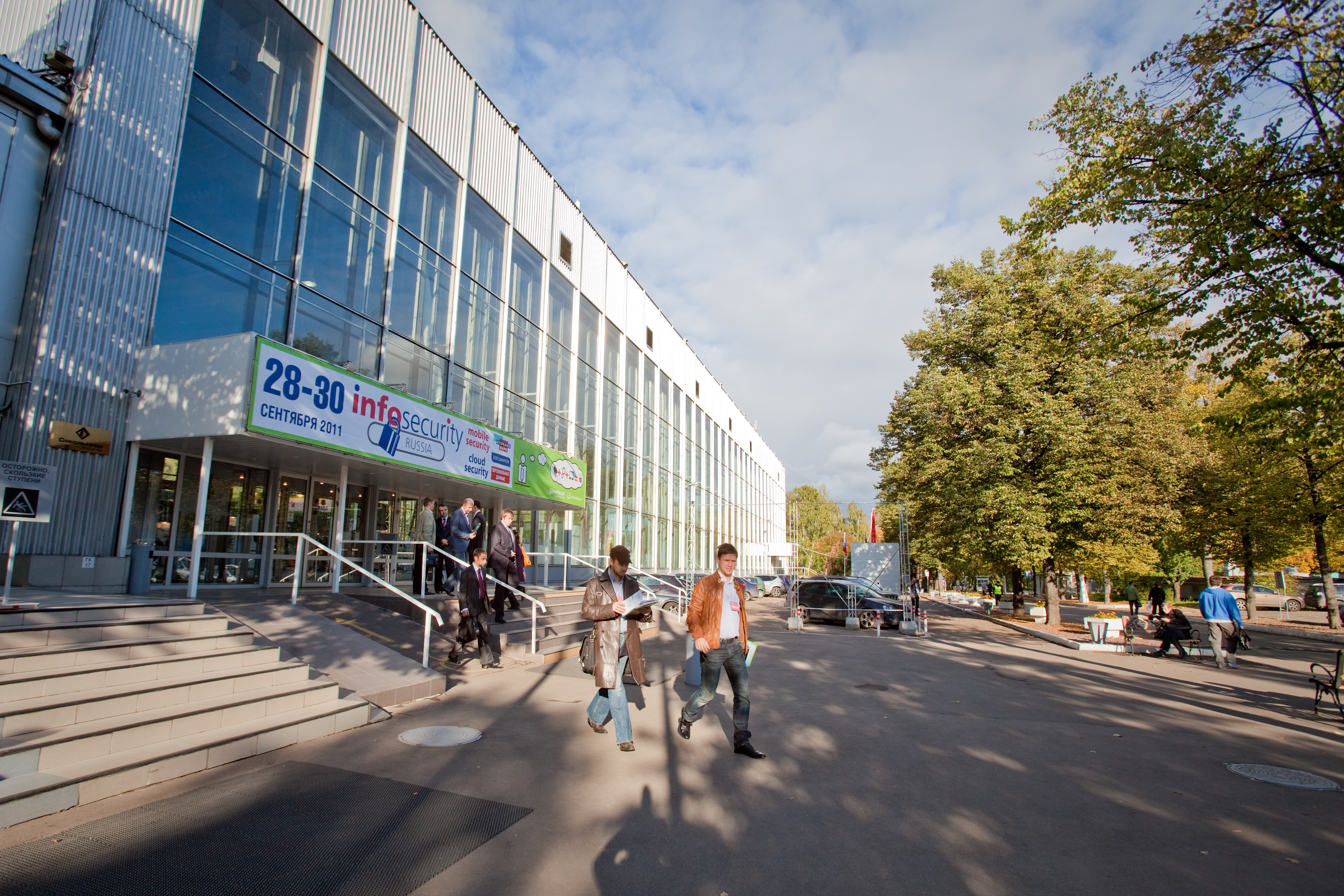
| Location | Sokolniki Park, Moscow, Russia |
- Senior Management
| President | Alexey Shaburov |
| CEO | Pavel Revenko |
- Foundation
| Beginning of the exhibition activity | 1959 |
| Web | https://www.sokolniki.com/en |
| Country | Russia |

Sokolniki Exhibition and Convention Centre is one of Moscow’s venues to host some exhibitions and conferences. It is located in East Administrative District directly in Sokolniki Park for Leisure and Recreation. It is one of the oldest exhibition sites and the first to start exhibition industry in Russia.

== History ==
The first exhibition to be held in Sokolniki took place in 1959. The American National Exhibition was the first international event to demonstrate some foreign achievements in the USSR. Nikita Khrushchev and the US Vice President Richard Nixon officially opened the exhibition. That’s when pavilion no. 2 witnessed the legendary “kitchen debate” between Nixon and Khrushchev at the General Electric Company’s booth. During the so-called “kitchen debate” America and the Soviet Union verbally jousted over which system was superior – communism or capitalism. Since then, exhibitions received a permanent residence in Sokolniki.

The first exhibition pavilion highlighted the event. It was a round dome construction invented by American architect and engineer Richard Fuller.

Construction of new exhibition pavilions in Sokolniki Park started in 1960s. Those were light single-floor buildings with a steel framework. During the first years the exhibitions were held only in summer because the buildings were not heated. The “Interorgtekhnika” international exhibition of 1966 was hosted in 20 exhibition halls occupying an area of 50 000 sq. m. The exhibition halls were mounted in various areas of the park depending on the requirements of a given project. In the years of prosperity Sokolniki had 22 exhibit halls. The biggest total exhibition area of 65 000 sq. m (indoor and outdoor) was occupied by the exhibition “Chemistry-70”. For many years Sokolniki has been the only international exhibition site in the Soviet Union.

56 national and international expositions were exhibited in Sokolniki in 1959-1976. The largest events displayed printing, chemical, engineering and machine-building, automobile and geodesic industries’ production. That time 19,000 million people visited the exhibition pavilions. The American National Exhibition (1959) attracted over one million visitors and the French National Exhibition (1961) was visited by about 1.8 million people. The same interest was attracted by specialized industrial exhibitions. For example, the exhibition "Chemistry-1965" was visited by 1.5 million people. The collections of all these exhibitions were placed among others in the two exhibition halls left by the Americans after their exhibition in 1959.

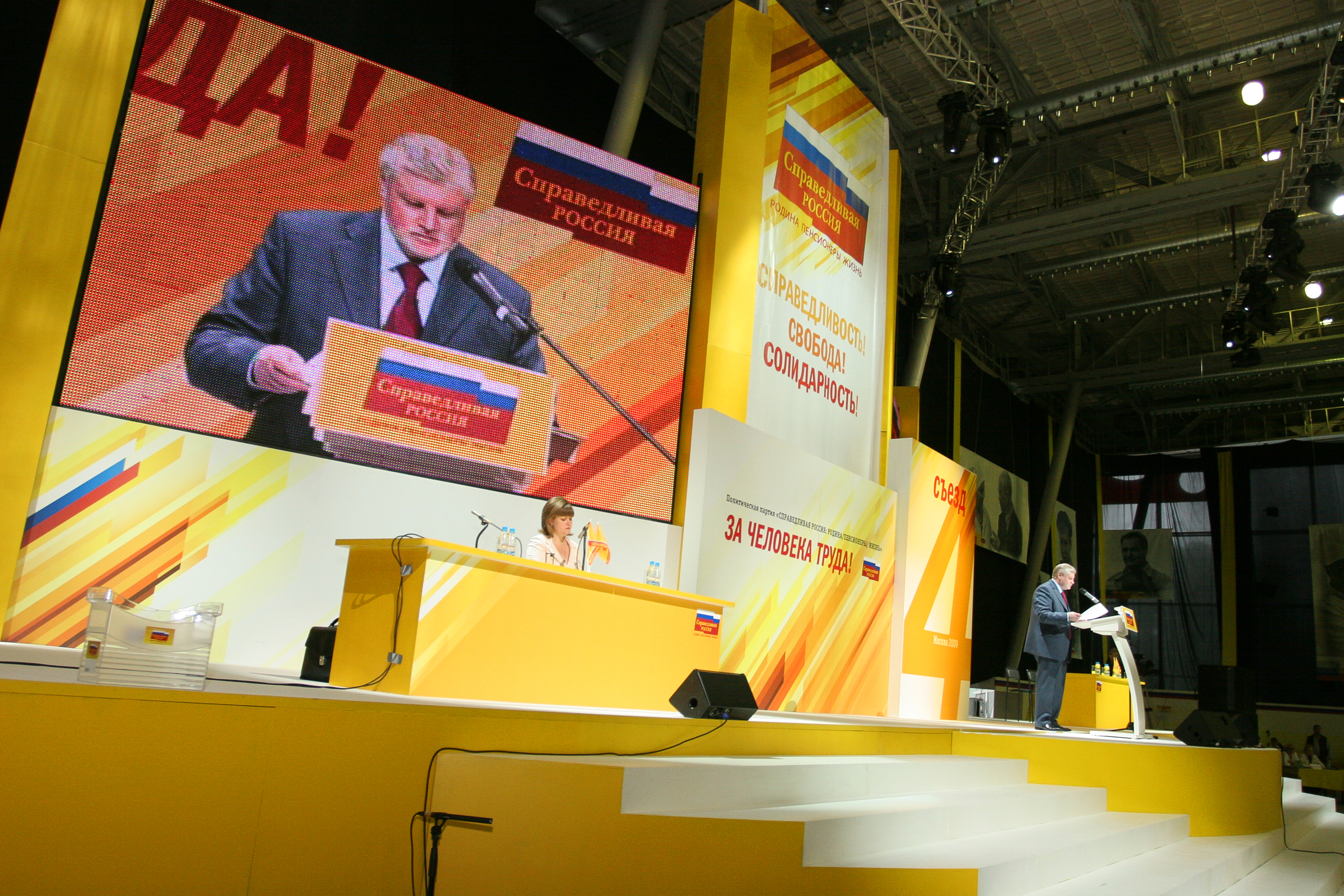
Pavilion 4 of the exhibition centre

Since 1977, Sokolniki has been suffering the period of exhibition “stagnation” that ended only in late 1980s.

In 2011, Sokolniki Exhibition and Convention Centre became a full member of the Russian Union of Exhibitions and Fairs, the Global Association of Exhibition Industry (UFI) and the International Association of Congress Centres (AIPC).

In 2011 close interaction was established between Sokolniki Exhibition and Convention Centre and Sokolniki Park for Leisure and Recreation. A new development strategy to be evolved.

== Sokolniki Exhibition and Convention Centre today ==
Nowadays, Sokolniki Exhibition and Convention Centre complex features 10 pavilions.

Contemporary Museum of Calligraphy opened in Sokolniki is the only museum in Russia dedicated to the art of fancy writing. The National School of Calligraphy works at the Museum.

== See also ==
- Exhibition of Achievements of National Economy
- Futurione
