= Museum of Calligraphy =

Museum in Moscow, Russia

Coordinates: 55°48′02″N 37°40′33″E

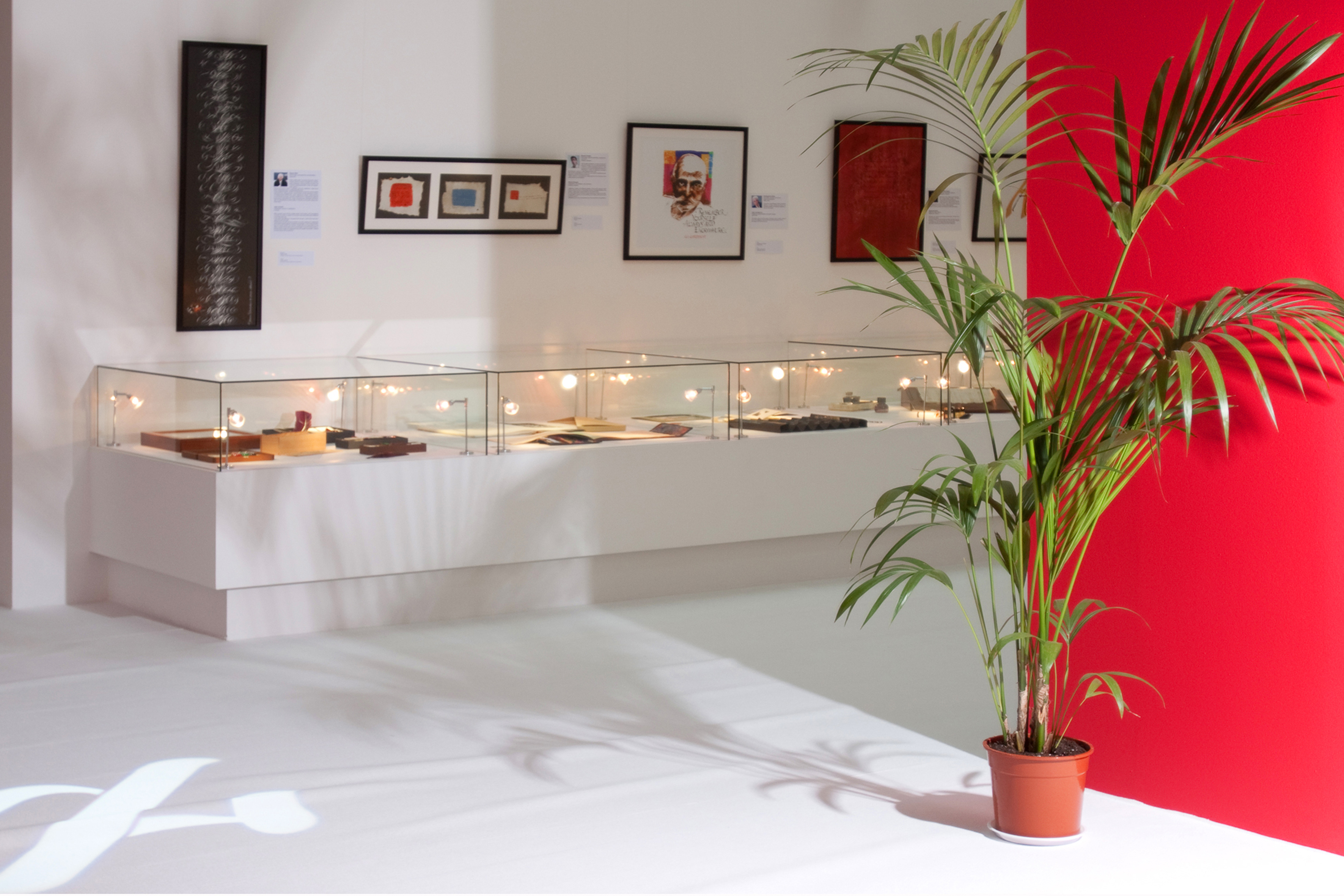
- Established: 14 August 2008
- Location: Sokolniki Park, Moscow
- Website: calligraphy-museum.com/eng/default.aspx/

The Contemporary Museum of Calligraphy, dedicated to the art of calligraphy, is situated in Sokolniki Park, Moscow. The museum collection features calligraphy masterpieces from 65 countries. The concept was elaborated by Sokolniki Exhibition and Convention Centre and the National Union of Calligraphers. The museum was officially opened on August 14, 2008.

Contemporary museum of calligraphy is a member of International Council of Museums (ICOM), American Alliance of Museums (AAM) and European Museum Forum (EMF). The exhibitions, organized by the museum, are supported be the Ministry of Culture of Russian Federation and are granted the auspices . In 2009 the museum's project International Exhibition of Calligraphy was approved by UFI (Global Association of the Exhibition Industry) for high professional level of exhibitions organization. In 2010 the project entered the final three of exhibitions World Cup according to Exhibition News Awards (London). In 2010 the International Exhibition of Calligraphy was certified by Russian Union of exhibitions and fairs (RUEF).

== Contemporary museum of calligraphy Timeline ==
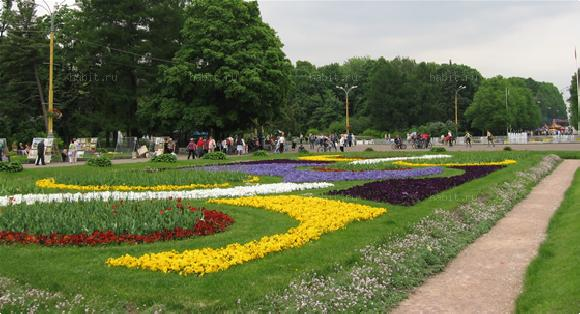
Museum is situated in one of the most beautiful places of Moscow - park Sokolniki

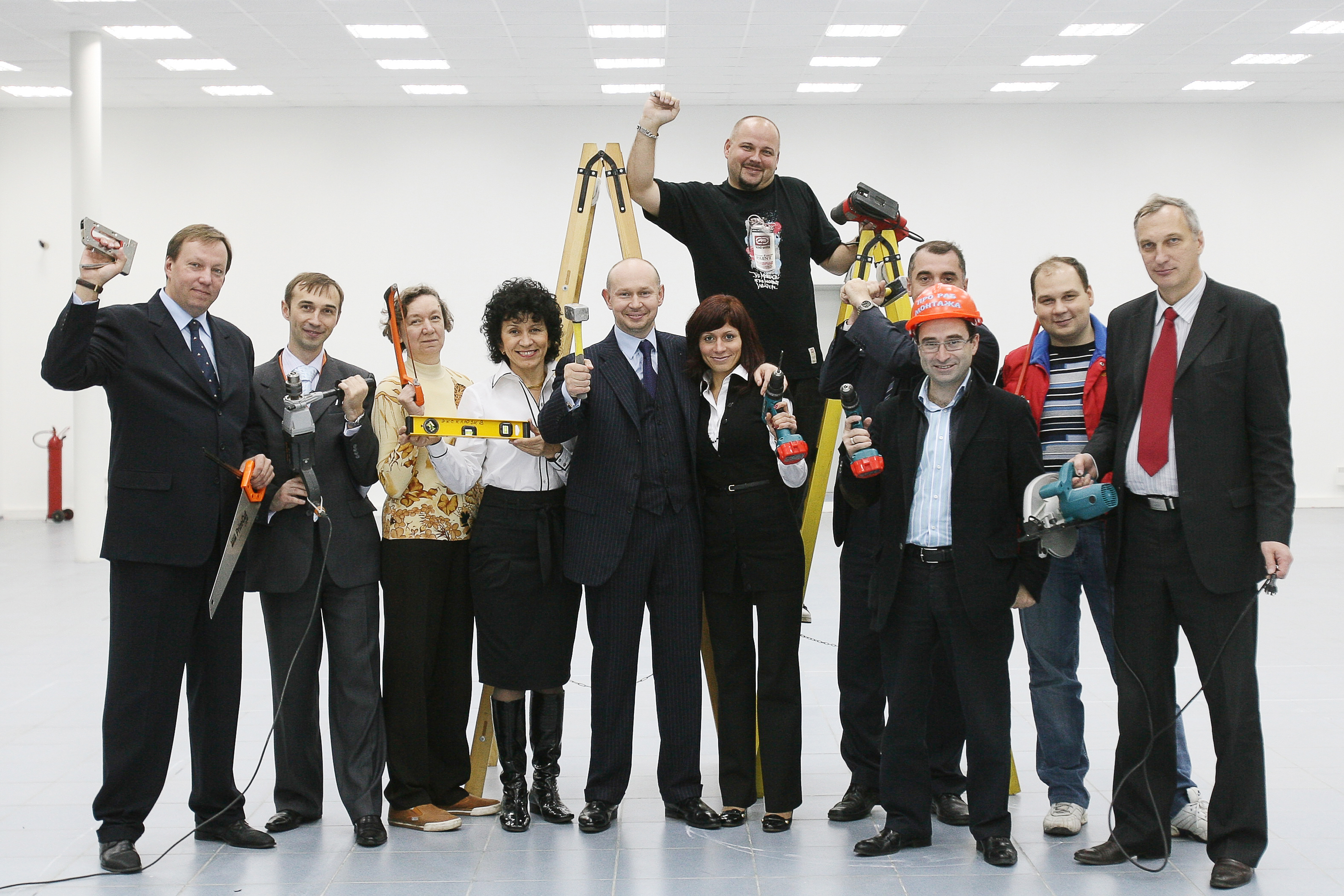
The museum's start

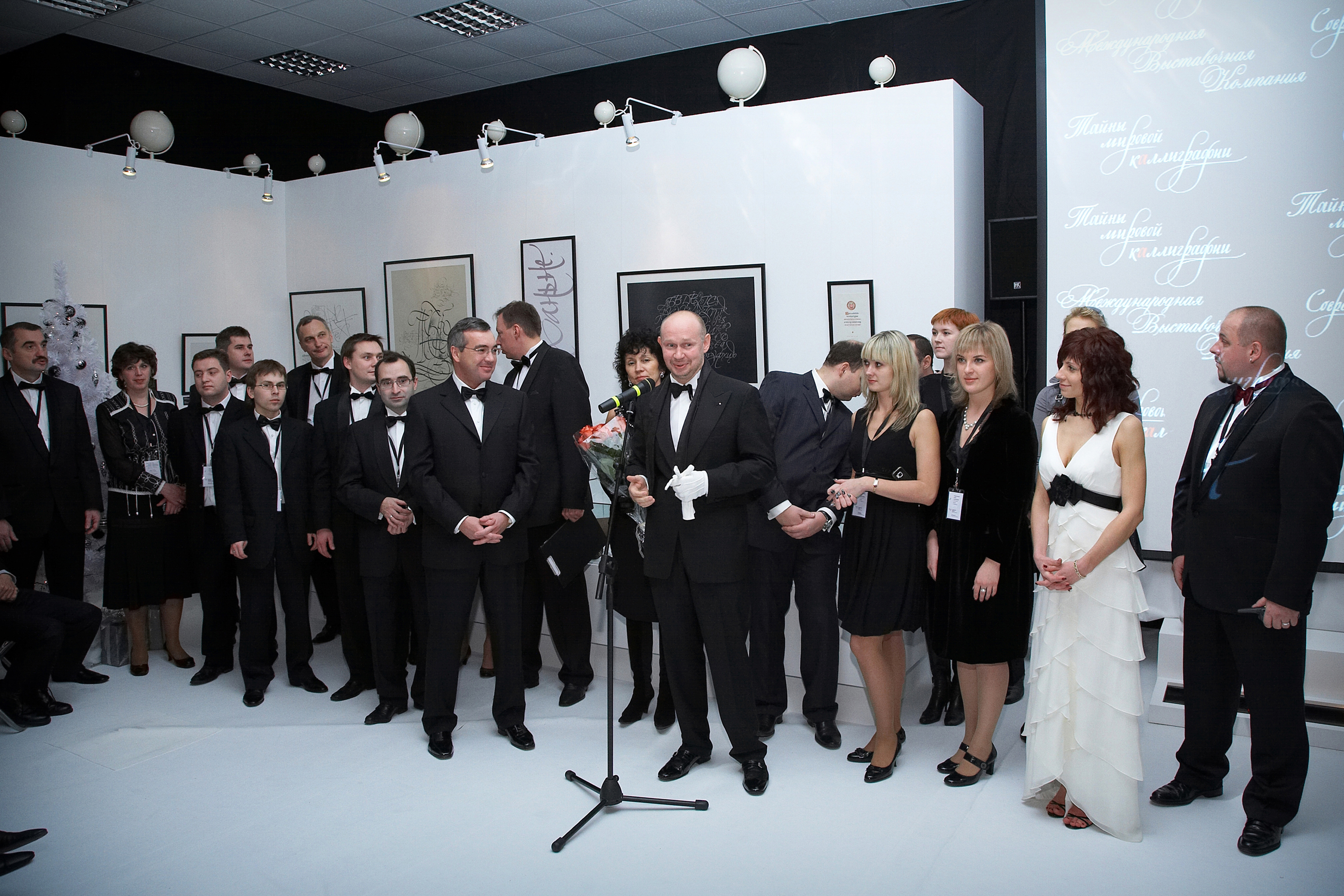
The solemn opening ceremony

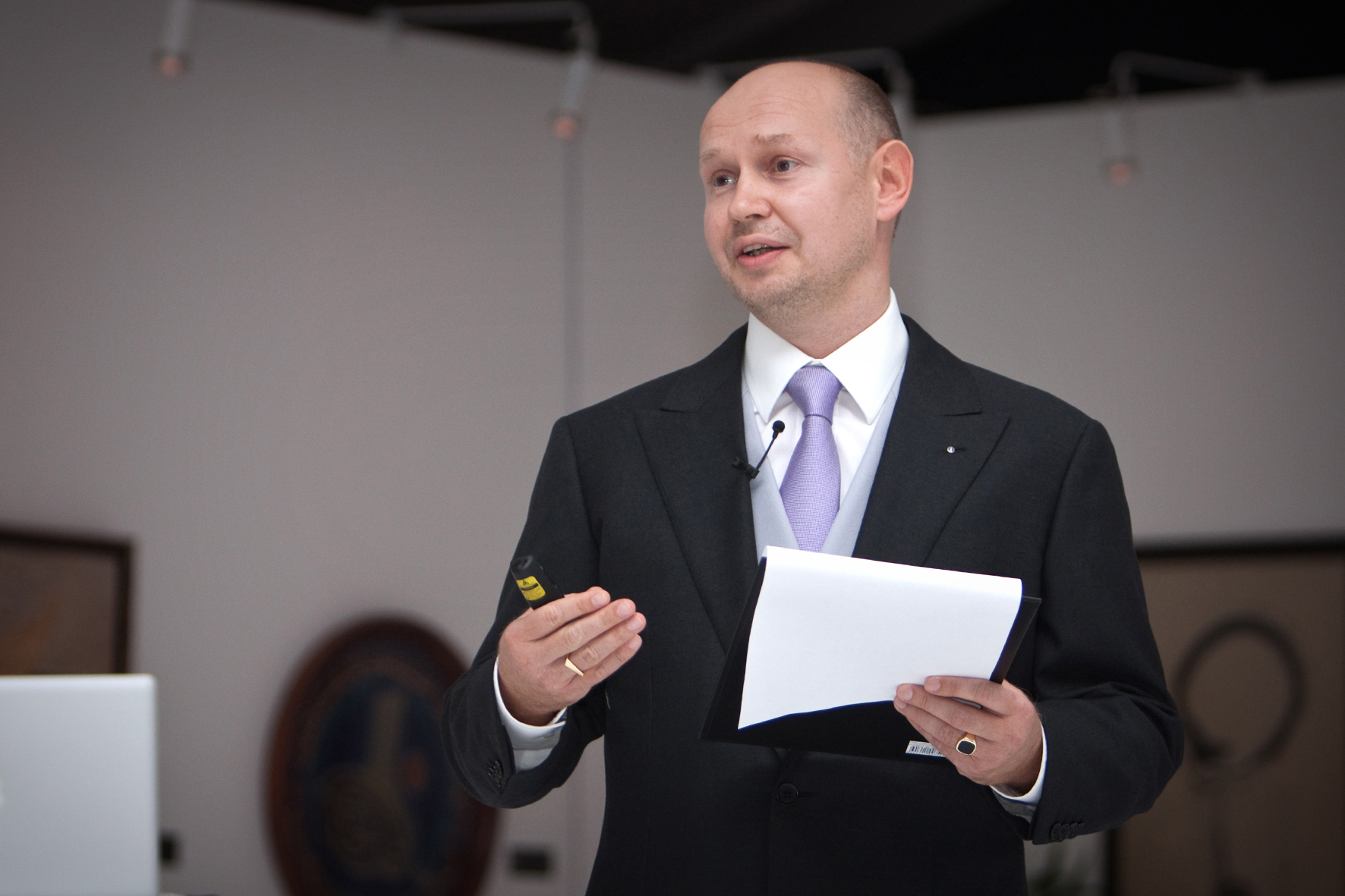
Alexey Shaburov, Director of the Contemporary museum of calligraphy

August 14, 2008—the opening day of the Contemporary museum of calligraphy.

September 16–21, 2008—The I International Exhibition of Calligraphy (Repin State Academic Institute of Painting Sculpture and Architecture, Saint Petersburg).

July 8, 2009 — at G8 summit Italian Prime Minister Silvio Berlusconi holly presented to the Russian president Dmitry Medvedev the Russian national anthem written by hand and illuminated.

August 14, 2009 — Museum's birthday. The museum gets new exhibit — the World largest Mezuzah written by a famous Israeli calligrapher Avraham Borshevsky. This scroll is by right included into the Guinness Book of World Records.

July 8, 2010 — the museum becomes a member of the American Association of Museum (AAM).

August 1, 2010 — the museum becomes a member of the European Museum Forum (EMF).

November 1 – December 15, 2012 – The IV International Exhibition of Calligraphy, took place at the Contemporary Museum of Calligraphy, Moscow, traditionally featuring lectures and workshops by Russian and foreign calligraphy masters. Its characteristic was the shape-shifting exposition that had been changed several times during the event

March 15–21, 2013 – Korean Calligrapher Kim Jong Chil's Solo Exhibition

April 3–7, 2014 – Russia-Asia art exhibition featuring calligraphy masterpieces from China, Japan, Korea, Israel and other countries

March 14 – April 12, 2015 – 90 calligraphers from over 50 countries took part in the 5th International Exhibition of Calligraphy held in Moscow in the Contemporary Museum of Calligraphy, and designed around the Contemplation of the Motherland theme.

September 1–10, 2017 – The opening of the 6th International Exhibition of Calligraphy highlighted the beginning of the autumn cultural season in Moscow.

May 9–31, 2018 – a calligraphy exhibition to celebrate the Great Patriotic War victory day.

The Great Chinese Calligraphy and Painting, a new exhibition organized by the Contemporary Museum of Calligraphy, will be held in Sokolniki Park on September 20–22, 2019.

== Museum activity ==
I International Exhibition of Calligraphy was held in Saint Petersburg in 2008. 68 participants from 26 countries took part in this exhibition

II International Exhibition of Calligraphy was held in Museum-educational complex Sokolniki in Moscow in 2009. More than 100 calligraphers from 34 countries. The exhibition halls’ total area is about 5 000 sq.m.

III International Exhibition of Calligraphy was held in Velikiy Novgorod in 2010. For this exhibition a special pavilion was built in the city historic centre near the Kremlin in Yaroslav's Court. 135 calligraphers from 43 countries.

The IV International Exhibition of Calligraphy at the Contemporary Museum of Calligraphy, Moscow, attended by 143 calligraphers from 44 countries (footnotes 10–11).

A dedicated exhibit hall was erected for the 6th International Exhibition of Calligraphy in Sokolniki. A record in scale and scope, the event featured over 350 works by 150 calligraphers from over 60 countries. The program included Kim Jong Chil's calligraphy performance, Luo Lei's talk and demonstration of the Chinese writing development history, Bilibin's Style Capital workshop by Marina Khankova and more.

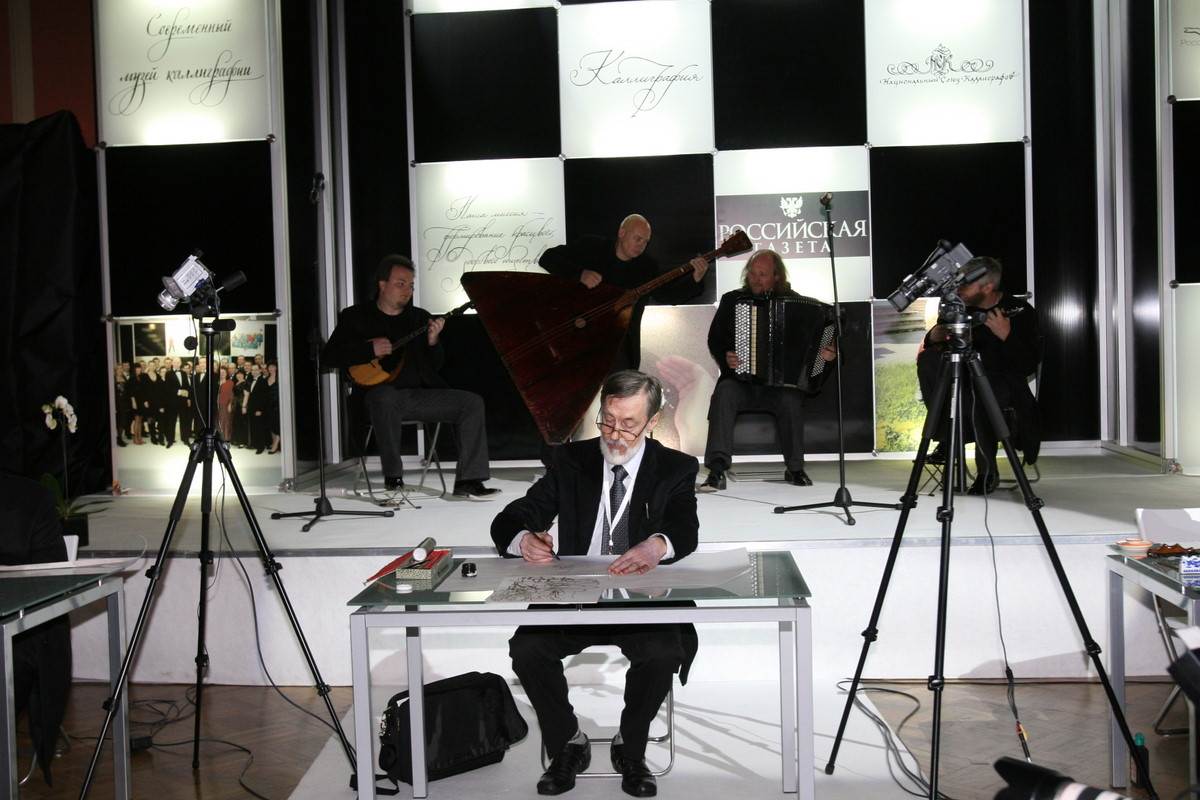
Calligrapher Petr Chobitko, opening ceremony of the I International exhibition of calligraphy

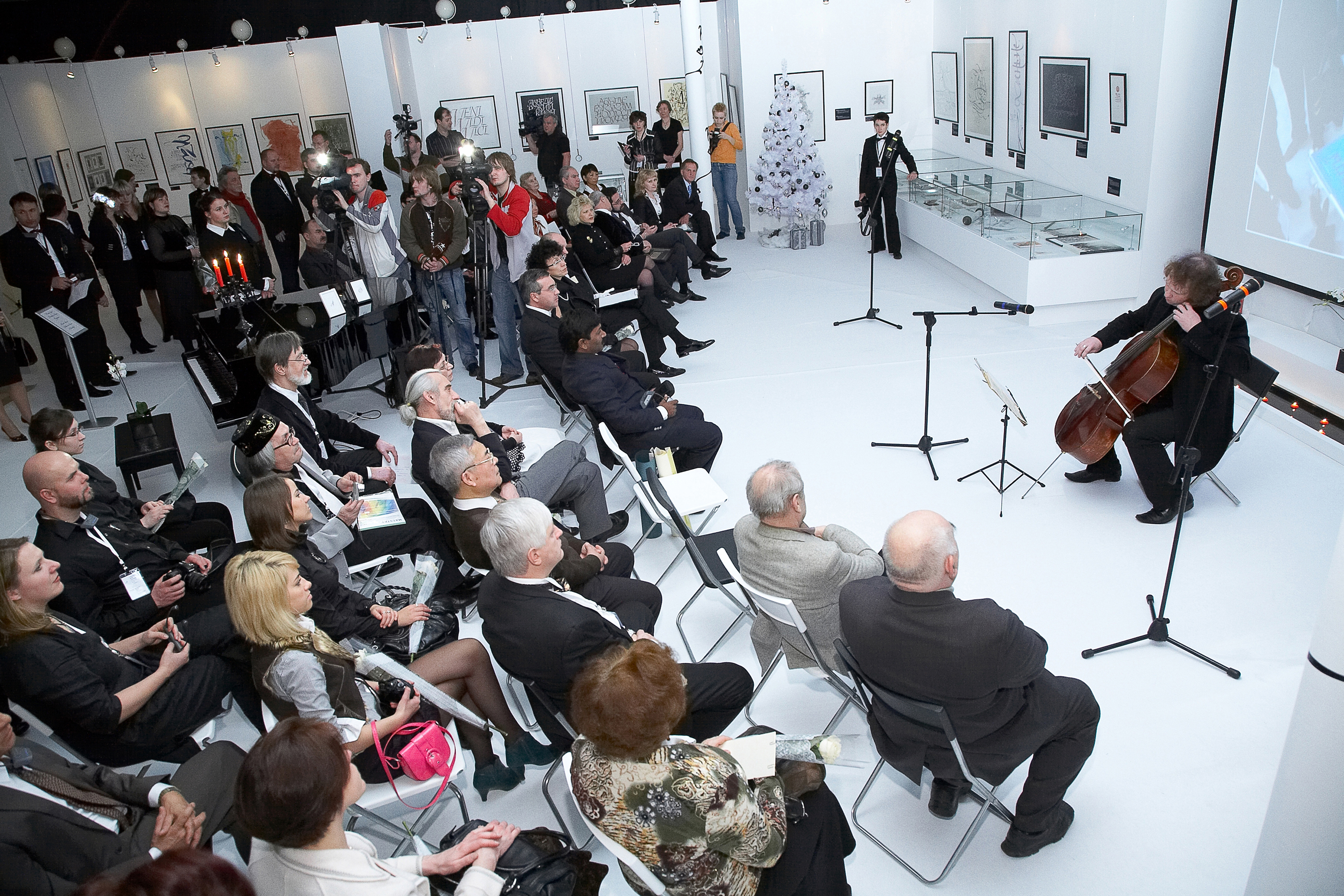
The opening ceremony of the Mystery of the world calligraphy exhibition

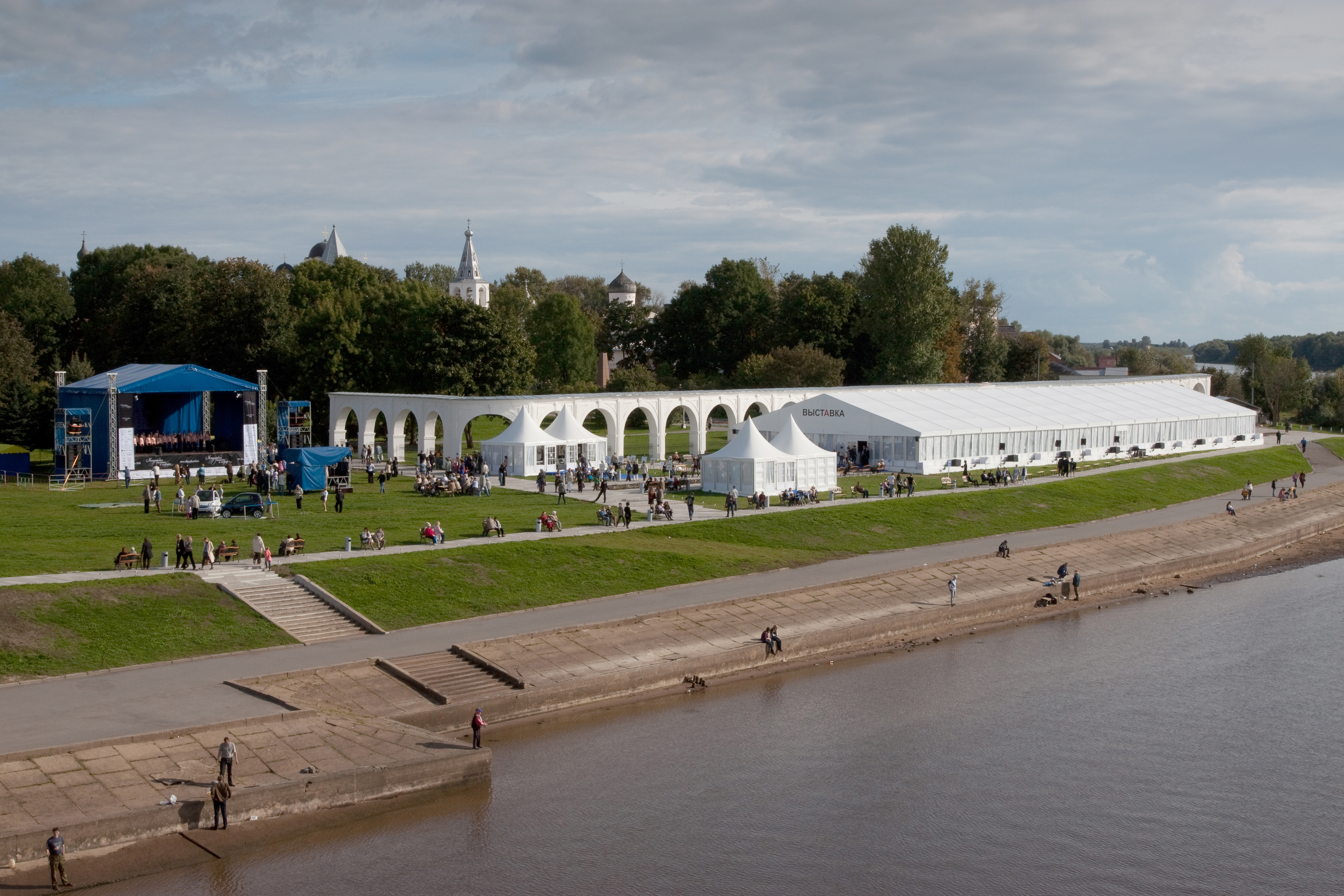
III International exhibition of calligraphy, exhibition pavilion on the bank oh the Volkhov river
- Cultural Festivals and Events

April 14–19, 2009 — festival of Japanese culture “Sakura” in the Contemporary museum of calligraphy.

- Master-classes

The Contemporary museum of calligraphy regularly organizes master-classes of Russian calligraphers and famous masters of writing art from abroad.

- The National School of Calligraphy

The School opened in November 2010. The School's aim is to show people what calligraphy art is, explore the history of different fonts, teach to use different pens, give basics of beautiful writing. The senior professor is Yury Koverdyaev, graphic artist, calligrapher, member of Russian Union of Artists.

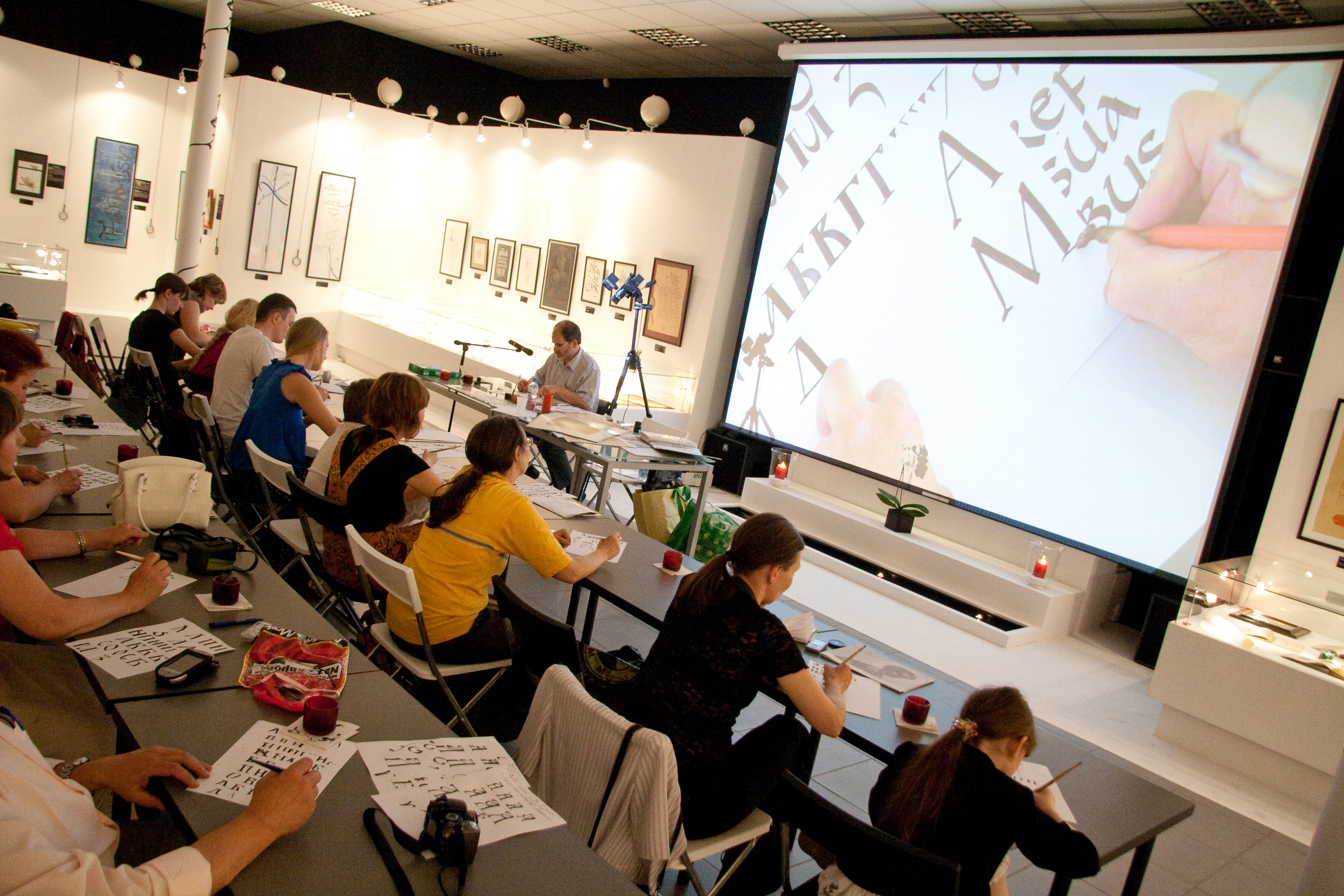
School's everyday life

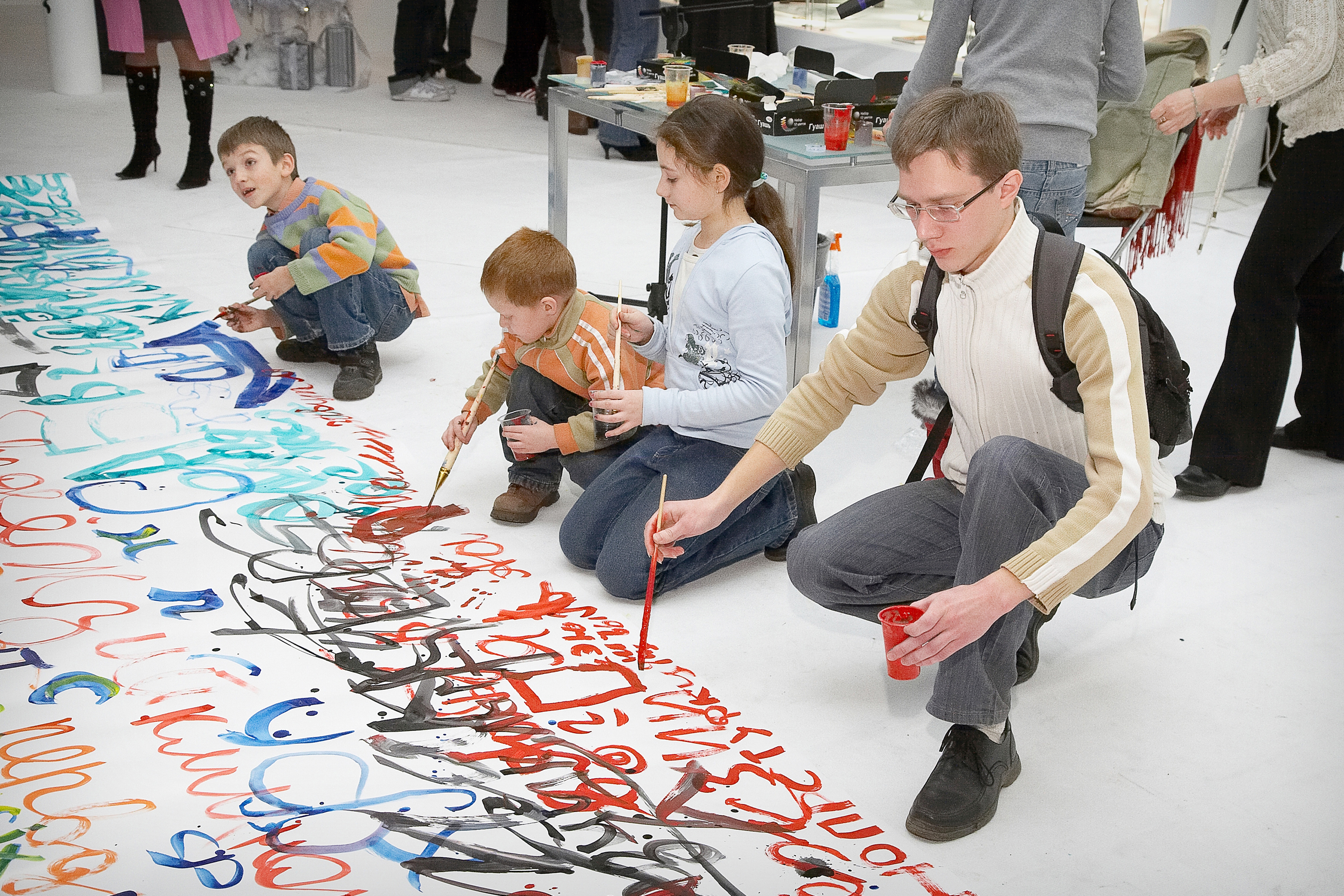
Calligraphy lesson for children

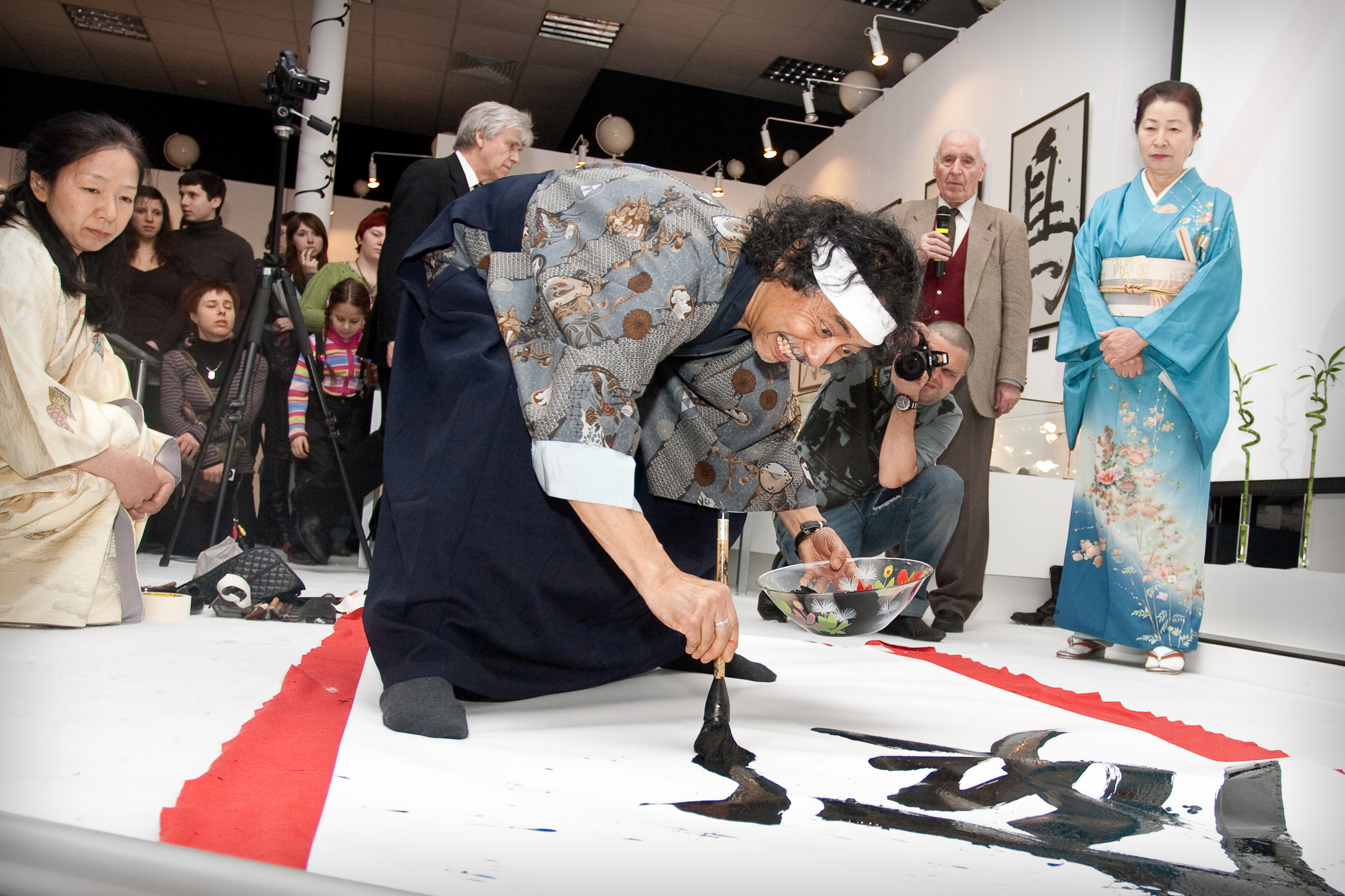
Master-class of Japanese calligraphers Sashida Takefusa and Hirose Shoko

== Exposition ==
The museum has a collection of national Russian calligraphy, European writing systems, samples of Hebrew calligraphy, Arabic calligraphy, Georgian calligraphy, Japanese hieroglyphs and Chinese calligraphy.

Samples of sacred calligraphy

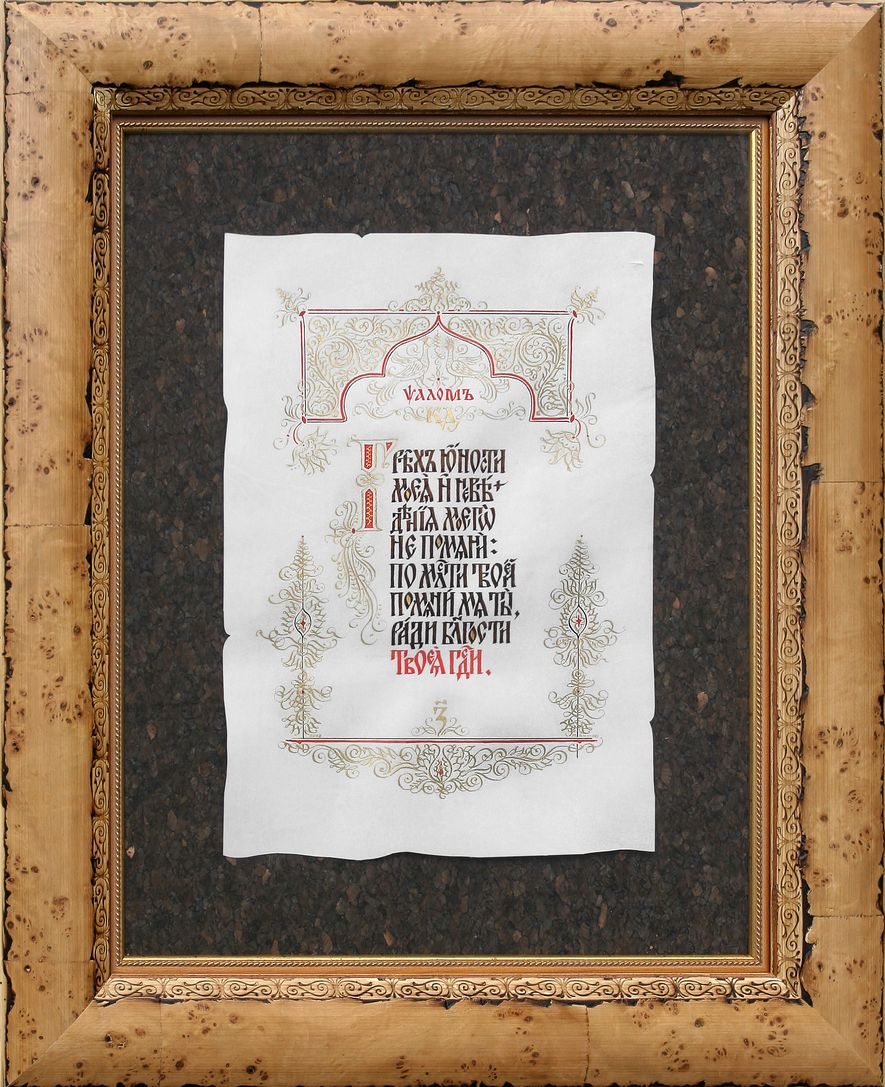
Petr Chobitko. "Remember not the sins of my youth and ignorance of mine…" Psalms 25:7

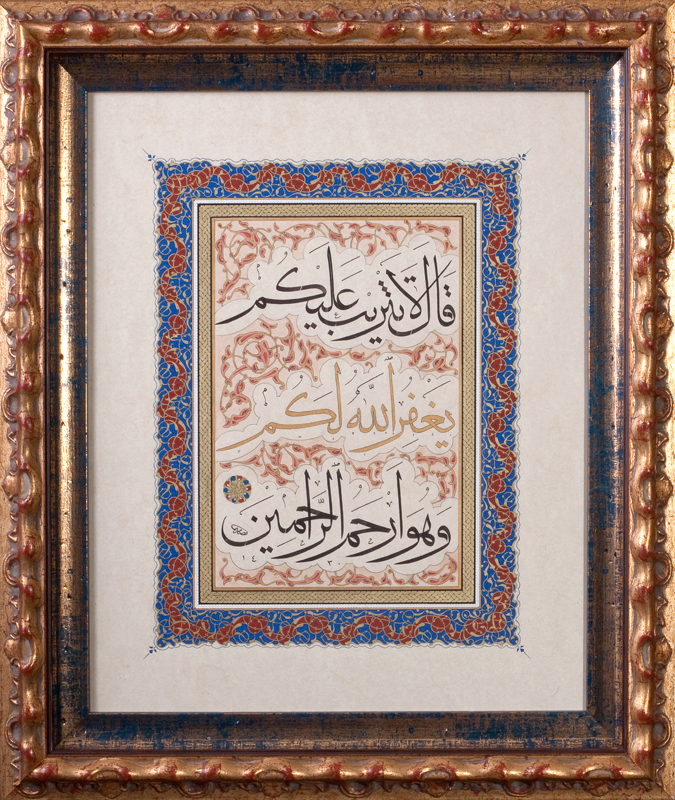
Nassar Mansour. "This day let no reproach be (cast) on you…" Surah 12 (Yusuf), verse 92

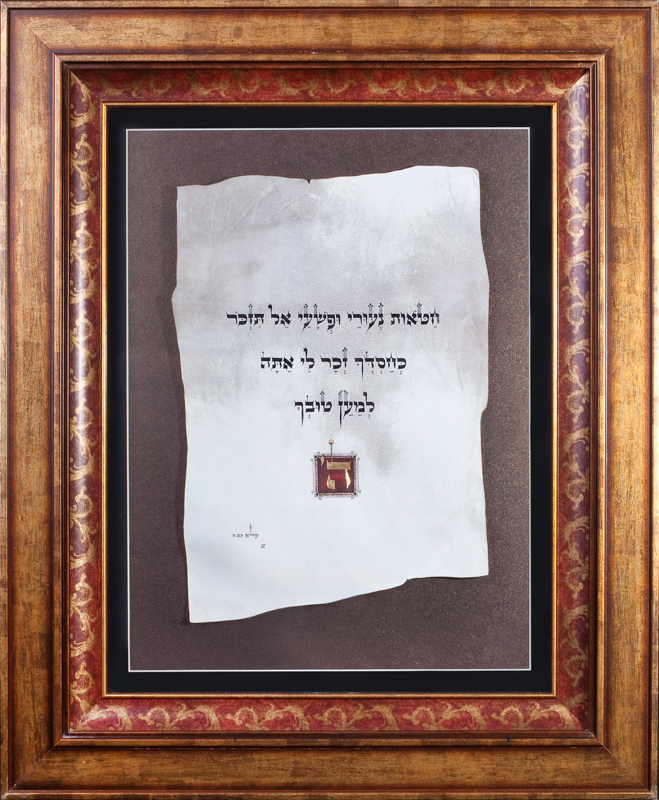
Avraham Borshevsky. "Remember not the sins of my youth...". Psalms 25:7

The Contemporary museum of calligraphy is a new and unique institution that unites painting, graphics and writing. The Contemporary Museum of Calligraphy is located at Pavilion 7 of the museum-educational complex Sokolniki.

== Calligraphy museums ==
- Contemporary museum of calligraphy
- Bartlhaus
- Hill Museum & Manuscript Library
- The Karpeles Manuscript Library
- Manuscript Museum (MsM)
- Naritasan Calligraphy museum
- The Modern Calligraphy Collection of the National Art Library at the Victoria and Albert Museum
- Ditchling Museum
- Klingspor Museum
- Sakip Sabanci Museum

== Calligraphy exhibitions ==
- International Exhibition of Calligraphy
- Calligraphy Exhibition at Ethos Art Gallery
- Japanese calligraphy exhibition

== World calligraphy association ==
- National Union of Calligraphers
- Association for the Calligraphic Arts
- North West Calligraphers’ Association
- The Chinese Calligraphy Association
- The Washington Calligraphers Guild
- Calligraphy Society of Florida
- The International Association of Master Penmen, Engrossers and Teachers of Handwriting IAMPETH
- L’esperluette
- Centro Internazionale Arti Calligrafiche
- Peannairi (Irish Scribes)
- Associazione Calligrafica Italiana (ACI)
- Meitokai
- Calligraphy & Lettering Arts Society

== Press coverage ==
- The Diplomat magazine. Treasures of Calligraphy, 1.2009

The museum was created in order “to provide the conditions for developing calligraphy as a language of mutual understanding without borders.”

- Mospress. Official web-portal of the Moscow government - available in Russian

Similar museums have been long working in Turkey, China, Japan and United Arab Emirates. It is by a very strange chance that Russia did not have any calligraphy museum before.

- RIA Novosti - available in Russian

Contemporary Museum of Calligraphy is the first Russian museum for the art of lettering.
