= Ilya Bogdesko =

Russian painter

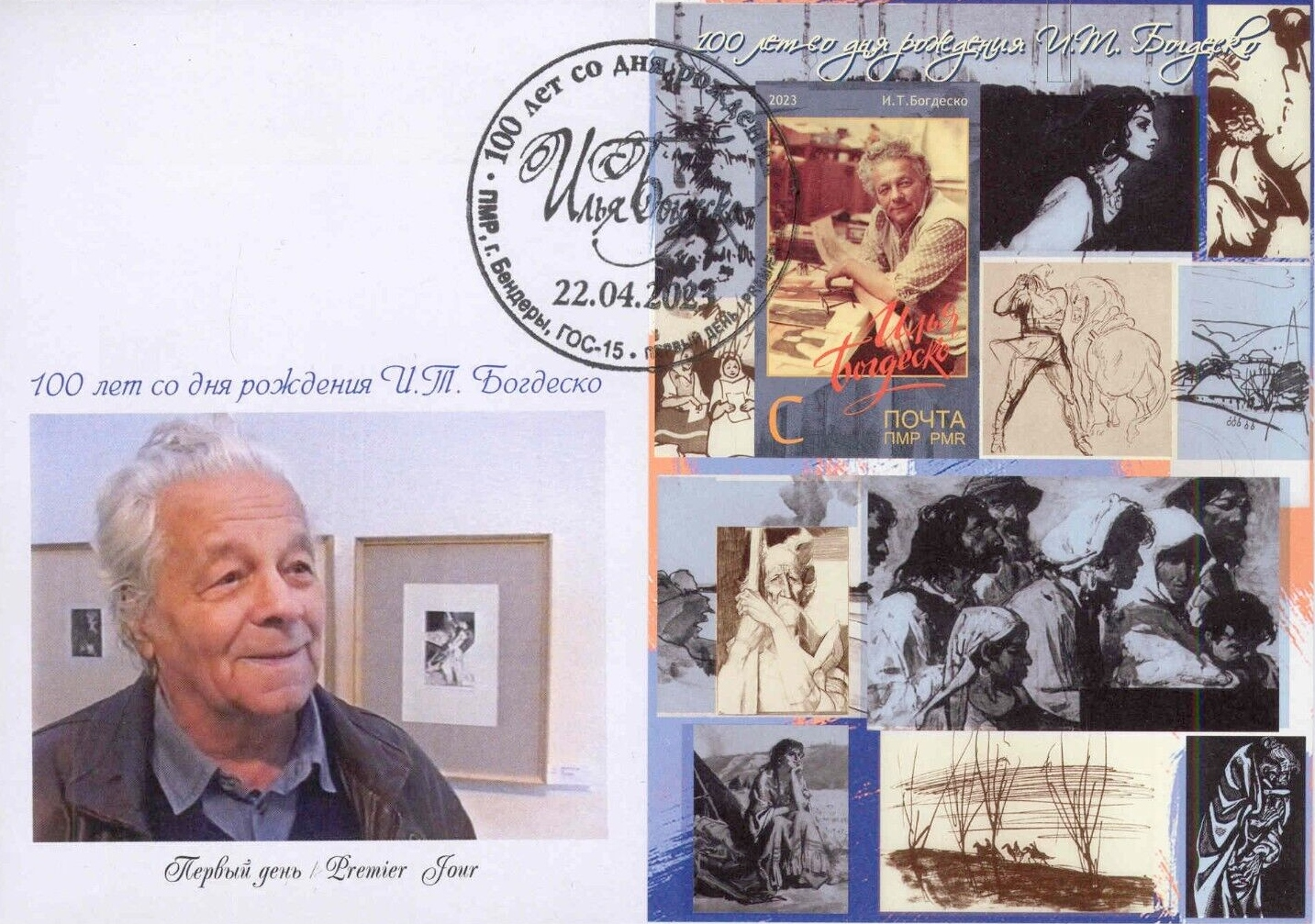
Bogdesko and his works on a 2023 postal cover of Transnistria dedicated to the 100th anniversary of his birth

Ilya Trofimovich Bogdesko (Russian: Илья́ Трофи́мович Богде́ско; 20 April 1923 – 29 March 2010) was a Soviet and Moldovan graphic artist, People's Painter of the USSR (1963), member of the Academy of Arts (1988).

Participant of the Great Patriotic War. Drafted into the Red Army was in 1942.

One of the most famous works, illustrations for the Jonathan Swift novel Gulliver's Travels, uses in the technique of engraving on metal cutter, widespread in the days of Swift. For this work at the National competition Book Art in 1980, Bogdesko was awarded the diploma of Ivan Fyodorov.

Over the course of five years, For about five years Bogdesko created a series of 33 illustrations for the Miguel de Cervantes novel Don Quixote. He illustrated the Ion Creangă book Punguța cu doi bani (Wallet with Two Coins).
