= Sokolniki Park =

Park in Moscow

Coordinates: 55°48′2″N 37°40′11″E

- Парк «Сокольники»
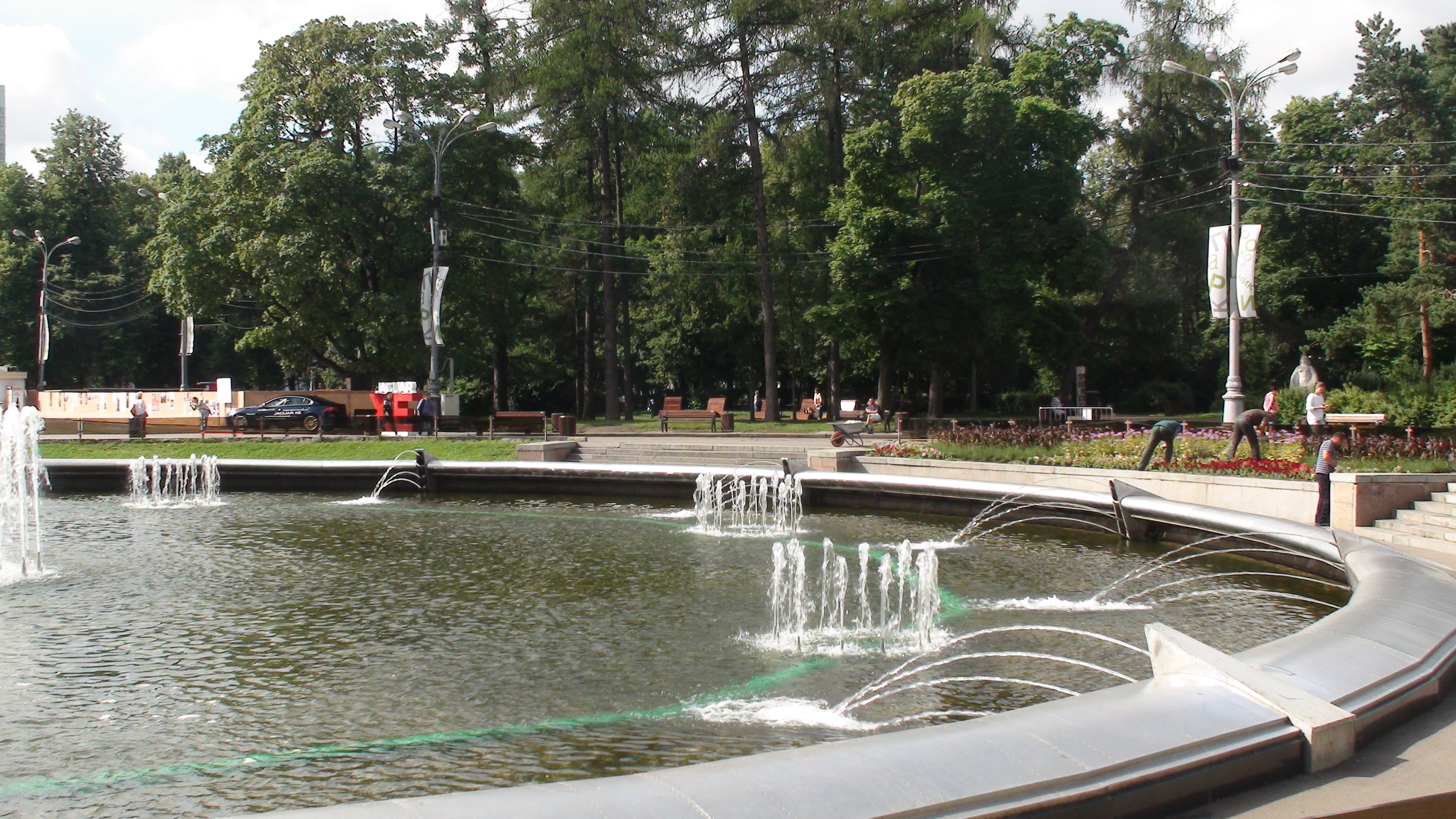
- Location in Moscow
- Location: Moscow, Russia
- Area: 516 hectares (1,280 acres)
- Status: Open all year
- Public transit: Sokolniki

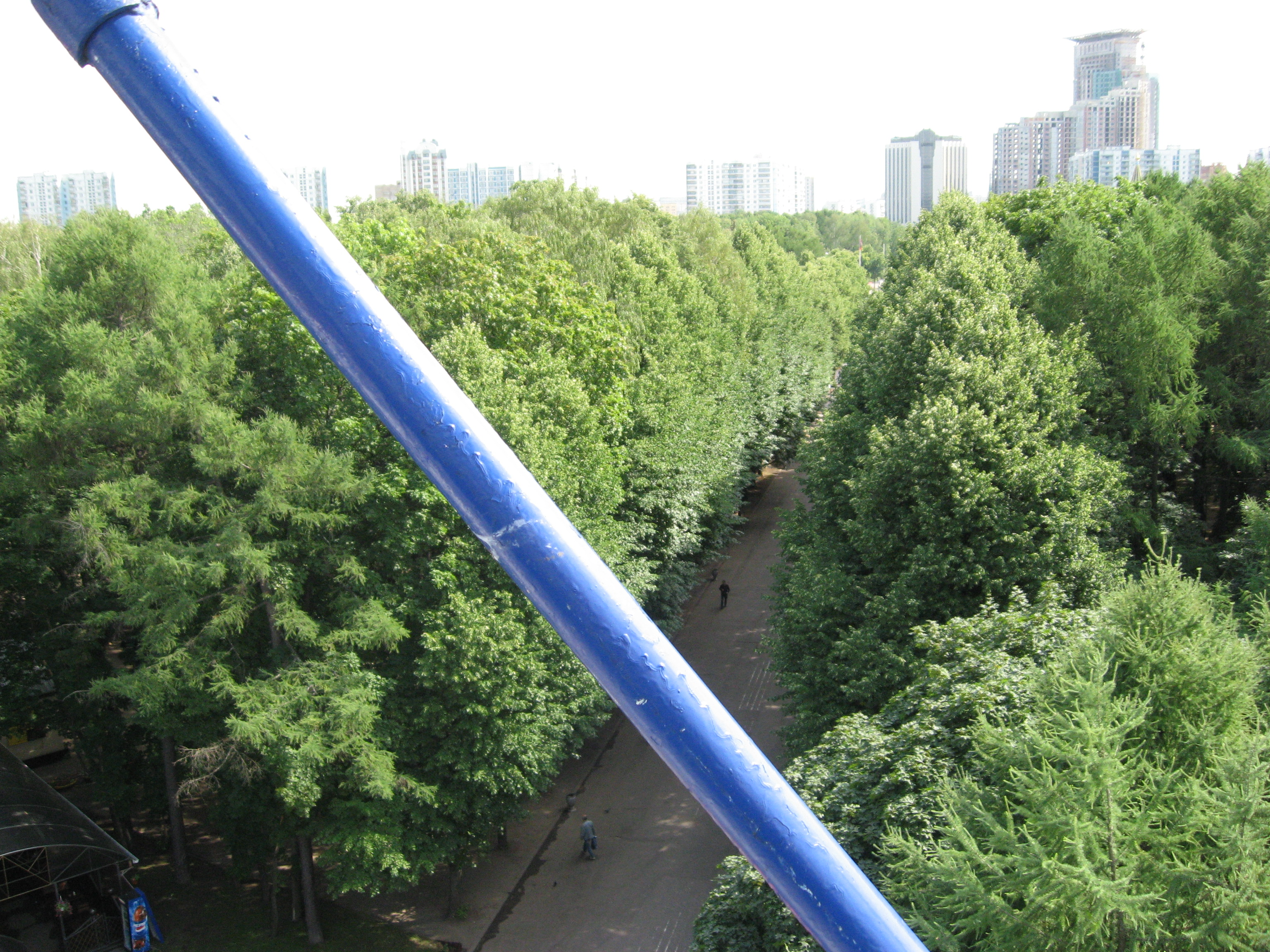
View of Sokolniki from the Ferris wheel

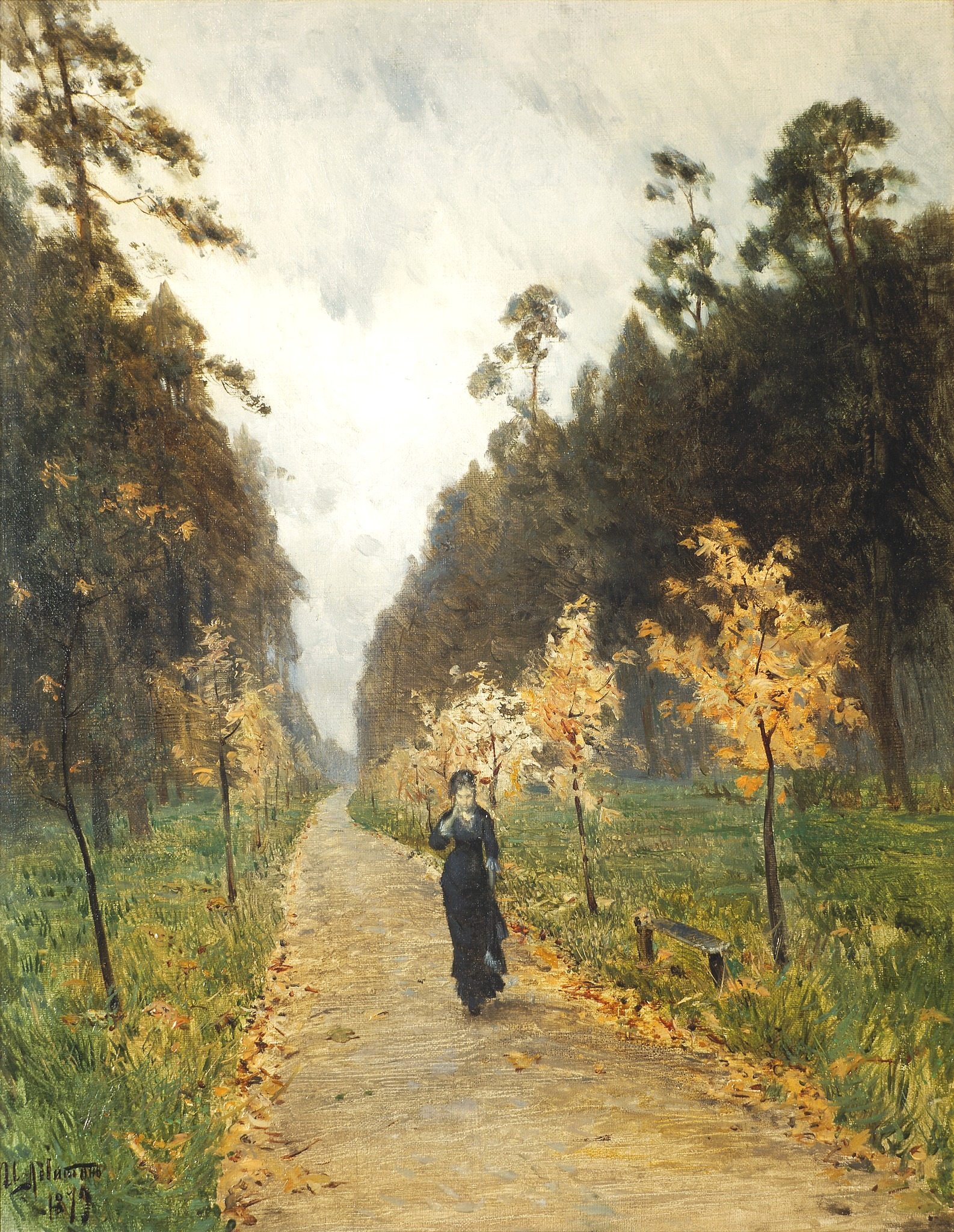
Isaac Levitan. Autumn day. Sokolniki. 1879

Sokolniki Park, named for the falcon hunt of the grand princes of Moscow formerly conducted there, is located in the eponymous Sokolniki District of Moscow. Sokolniki Park is not far from the center of the city, near Sokolnicheskaya Gate. The park gained its name from the Sokolnichya Quarter, the 17th-century home of the sovereign's falconers (sokol (сокол) is the Russian word for falcon). It was created by Tsar Alexei Mikhailovich (father of Peter the Great), a keen hunter who loved to go falconing in the area.

Today, Sokolniki is a typical Russian park, with an aging funfair and other amusements for children, and numerous fast food stalls all clustered near the main entrance. In summer the central alleyways are a mass of brightly colored formal flowerbeds, while the depths of the park are a wilderness home to pines and spruces, birches and oaks, limes and maples - all trees native to the Moscow region - as well as a number of non-indigenous trees, such as larches, cedars, walnut, red oaks, etc. The park's wildlife includes hares, squirrels and weasels, as well as 76 types of bird.

== History ==
The park's current layout of clearings and alleys began under Tsar Peter the Great. In 1900 a "labyrinth", or network of alleys, was laid out.

It was established as a public municipal park in 1878. From 1931 onwards, Sokolniki has been developed as an official "park of culture and leisure". The park, with an area of six square kilometers, is also the most Western extension of a larger Losiny Ostrov natural reserve that spans from the Eastern edge of Sokolniki to MKAD ring road and beyond. The park territory contains an amusement park, a winter outdoor ice skating rink and an exposition centre which was the site of the Kitchen Debate between Richard Nixon and Nikita Khrushchev at the American National Exhibition in 1959. It also contains the Sokolniki Sports Palace, home to the ice hockey team HC Spartak Moscow. The soccer club in Sokolniki was the site of the 2006 murder of Central Bank of Russia executive Andrey Kozlov.

== Culture institutions ==
- Contemporary museum of calligraphy

== Sokolniki Chess Club ==
Sokolniki Park is famous for its chess club, which is located on the rotunda of the far end of the park's circle. The chess club produced some of the finest grandmasters of history. During the 1959 US-USSR expo, exhibition matches were held for the eyes of the US delegation, headed by then-Vice President Richard Nixon. In the 1970s, the then-little known engineer Natan Sharansky coached locals at the chess club. He would later go on to be a renowned refusenik activist and Israeli politician. In the mid-1970, the soon-to-be famous grandmaster Alexey Vyzmanavin practiced chess and started "hanging out with the hustlers".

== Sokolniki Exhibition and Convention Centre ==
The Sokolniki Exhibition and Convention Centre is one of Moscow's venues to host some exhibitions and conferences. It is located in East Administrative District directly in Sokolniki Park for Leisure and Recreation. It is one of the oldest exhibition sites and the first to start exhibition industry in Russia.

== Museum of Sokolniki Park ==
On September 5, 2015, a museum dedicated to preserving and commemorating the history of Sokolniki was opened on the first floor of the park's administration building (Sokolnichesky Val, Building 1, Structure 1). During the opening ceremony, Alexander Kibovsky, the head of Moscow's Department of Culture, donated family photographs to the museum's collection, which were related to the post-war restoration of Sokolniki Park.

The museum hosts exhibitions, guided tours, and quests.

== Transport ==
Located 400 meters from the park's main entrance is Sokolniki station on the Sokolnicheskaya Line of the Moscow Metro. Nearby, the construction of the eponymous station on the Bolshaya Koltsevaya Line (Greater Ring Line) has been completed. At the park's western boundary lie the Moscow-3 and Malenkovskaya platforms of the Yaroslavl direction of the Moscow Railway. Public transport routes along the park's boundaries include:

- Eastern side: Trams 4 and 25, and Bus 75.
- Northern side: Trams 11 and 25, and Bus 311.
- Southern side: Buses 40, 122, 140, and 265.
- Western side: Bus 140.

Additionally, the Rizhsky Railway Station, Rizhskaya metro station (Kaluzhsko-Rizhskaya Line), and the Rizhskaya and Rzhevskaya railway platforms are situated near the park.

== Bibliography ==
- Hayden, Peter (2006). Russian Parks and Gardens. Frances Lincoln. ISBN 978-0-7112-2430-8.
- Cite Sokolniki Park
