= Abdul Sahib Nasrallah =

Iraqi author and custodian of the Imam Husayn shrine

Sayyid Abdul Sahib Nasrallah
- السيد عبد الصاحب نصر الله

40th Custodian of Imam Husayn Shrine
- In office March 19, 1992 – April 5, 2003
- Preceded by: Adel al-Killidar
- Succeeded by: Mohammed Hussain Nasrallah

Personal details
- Born: Abd al-Saheb Naser Husayn Nasrallah; February 28, 1953 (age 73) Karbala, Kingdom of Iraq
- Education: University of Baghdad (BA); Moscow University for the Humanities (D)

Sayyid Abd al-Saheb Naser Nasrallah (Arabic: عبد الصاحب ناصر آل نصر الله; born February 28, 1953) is an Iraqi author, and served as the 40th custodian of the Imam Husayn Shrine from 1992 until 2003.

== Early life and education ==
Nasrallah was born on February 28, 1953, to Nasser Nasrallah, a servant in the Abbas shrine. He hails from the noble Al Faiz family, and claims agnatic descent from Muhammad's daughter Fatimah and her husband, Ali, the first Shia Imam. He grew up and studied in Karbala, and joined the Baath party in the 1970s. He achieved his bachelor's degree in accounting and business management from the University of Baghdad. He also achieved a diploma in political economy science from the Institute of Youth.

== Custodianship ==
=== Appointment ===
After the 1991 uprising, Adel al-Killidar had abandoned the sidana of the Husayn shrine, having fled to Baghdad, whilst the saden of the Abbas shrine, Muhammad-Husayn Dhiya al-Din, had been dismissed due to his support of the rebels. Hence, this left both shrines vacant of a custodian, and so at first the Baathists assigned Mehdi al-Ghirabi as the saden of the Abbas shrine. This however, did not go well with the people of the city, as al-Ghirabi was neither from a noble Karbalaei family or one that had a history in serving in the shrines, in fact he wasn't even from Karbala. Furthermore, the names that were nominated for custodianship for the Husayn shrine included Sheikh Abd al-Latif al-Darmi and Sayyid Yusuf al-Wajidi, which again were nominees that had no relationship or history with the shrines or the city. This led a number of the city's dignitaries to meet with the mayor, Abd al-Khaliq Abd al-Aziz, and nominate Nasrallah. This went well with the mayor, since Nasrallah fulfilled the sidana requirements, and was a member of the party. So on March 19, 1992, he was assigned as the saden of the Husayn shrine.

=== Accomplishments ===
Some of the notable accomplishments that occurred under Nasrallah's custodianship included:

- The remake of the cage of Ibrahim al-Mujab's shrine, after it was destroyed during the uprising. It was unveiled to the public on October 1, 1992.
- The maintenance of the cage of Habib ibn Madhahir's shrine, after it was damaged during the uprising. It was completed in 1993.
- The fencing of the outer inner precinct of the shrine with a silver window and red marble pillars. It was completed in 1993.
- The gilding of the balcony that encircles the upper sections of the minarets. It was completed in 1994.
- Converting the Leader of the 1920 Revolution graveyard into the shrines ceremonial hall in 1996.
- The Bayn al-Haramayn regeneration programme–after it was desecrated during the 1991 uprising–removing all concrete damns, laying a concrete floor, and planting palm trees across the area. The project was completed in 1997.
- Creating a golden door inside the shrine, made exclusively by Iraqi hands, for the first time in the history of the shrine. The door was completed on January 4, 1999.
- Expanding the shrine of the martyrs of Karbala, and creating a second window for it in the southern rawaq (hallway). This project was done without the knowledge of the authorities, since they were against the idea, however Nasrallah was adamant on the expansion for a number of reasons, so he directed the Najafi gilder, Majid Abu al-Nawair and the Karbalaei architect Hassan al-Memar, and together they worked on the expansion and completed it on August 8, 2000.
- The initiation of the University of Karbala project, and Nasrallah using his influence, along with a number of other noblemen of Karbala, to gather funds to establish the university in 2002.

=== Arbaeen Pilgrimage 1996 ===
In addition to the damage the city took after the uprising, the city was struck by a strong wave of depression. Nasrallah met numerously with the newly assigned mayor, Saber al-Douri, to discuss opening way for pilgrims to visit the Husayn shrine on Arbaeen, using the city's depleted situation as an excuse. Nasrallah's encounters brought results, and al-Douri managed to get permission from higher authority, to allow a large pilgrimage take place in the city. On July 6, 1996, which coincided with the 20th of Safar that year, Karbala witnessed a large gathering of approximately seven million pilgrims. This ease lasted for a while under al-Douri, however by 2000, restrictions for pilgrims returned, and were harsher.

=== U.S. Invasion ===
He served as custodian up until the 2003 invasion of Iraq. After Karbala was captured by U.S. forces on April 5, 2003, he fled to Pakistan, then to Iran where he settled for a while, to avoid clashes with his countrymen who were frustrated at the time with the Baath and anyone affiliated with them.

== Return to Iraq ==
Ever since his dismissal from the sidana, Nasrallah has been occupied with writing books, and has produced a number of publications on the history, culture, and literacy of Islam and Karbala.

== Works ==
=== Books ===
- Tarikh Karbala (History of Karbala). 8 volumes.
- Buyutat Karbala al-Qadima (Old Houses of Karbala).
- Tarikh al-Sidana al-Husayniya wal-Abbasiya (History of the Custodianship of the Husayn and Abbas Shrines).
- Tadhhiya wal-Ramz (Sacrifice and Symbolism).
- al-Hawadith wal-Waqa'i Fi Tarikh Karbala (Events and Chronicles in the History of Karbala).
- Karbala: al-Tarikh wal-Qadasah (Karbala: History and Sanctity).
- Karbala Fi Adab al-Rahlat (Karbala in the Literature of Travellers).
- Hadithat al-Zarka wal-Harakat al-Mahdawiya Fi al-Iraq (The Zarka Incident and the Mahdawi Movements in Iraq).

== See also ==
- Imam Husayn Shrine
- Al Faiz family
