= Hassan Nasrallah (businessman) =

Iraqi nobleman (1881–1959)

Sayyid Hassan Nasrallah
- السيد حسن نصر الله
- Born: Hassan Muhammad Sultan Nasrallah; December 27, 1881; Karbala, Ottoman Iraq
- Died: October 8, 1959 (aged 77); Karbala, Republic of Iraq
- Children: Nathum; Hashem; Adnan
- Relatives: Mohammed Hussain Nasrallah (great nephew); Aref Nasrallah (great nephew); Mohammed Hassan Dhiya al-Din (brother-in-law)

Sayyid Hassan Hammoud Nasrallah (Arabic: حسن حمود آل نصر الله; December 27, 1881 – October 8, 1959) was an Iraqi nobleman, activist, and businessman.

== Early life ==
Nasrallah was born into an aristocratic family, that had held a high status in Karbala. His father, Muhammad (Hammoud) Nasrallah (d. October 27, 1901), was the head of the traders of Karbala, in the late Ottoman era, and his mother, Amina Thabit (d. 1919), was the granddaughter of Muhammad-Ali Thabit (d. 1817), the 10th saden of the Al-Abbas Shrine, as well as the great-granddaughter of Dowlatshah. He was the fourth of ten siblings. His parents respectively hail from the noble families of Al Faiz and Al Zuhayk, and both claim agnatic descent from Musa al-Kadhim, the seventh Shia Imam. His ancestors on both sides, on some occasions ruled Karbala, and held custodianship of its holy sites.

== Business career ==
Nasrallah's father died in 1901, and his older brother, Sultan, assumed the family business, and inherited the status of the head of traders. However, Sultan died four years later, and Nasrallah in turn took over. He continued his father's business, and established his own company, selling agricultural products and appliances, some imported from the US and Europe. After his death in 1959, his sons became chairmen of the company and began to further expand the business.

== Political activism ==
Nasrallah was involved in a number of political movements in Karbala during the first third of the 20th century, being at the forefront of activism, namely against British occupation. In July 1920, he was among other noblemen that revolted against the British and seized the city of Karbala, which was later split into councils, Nasrallah being part of the High Council of Military Affairs. The councils were then disbanded after the death of Mirza Taqi al-Shirazi in August of that year, and a mutasarrif was assigned. However, the local government was short-lived, with the British ending the revolt in October 1920.

Nasrallah continued his activism, by joining his cousin, Muhsin al-Tawil Nasrallah, who lead the Karbala branch of the Iraqi Renaissance Party–a party also made up of noblemen who had been active in their resistance to British occupation. The party was outlawed and closed down by British High Commissioner Percy Cox in the late 1920s.

== Personal life ==
Nasrallah was married to Muluk Dhiya al-Din (d. 1968), daughter of Murtadha Dhiya al-Din (d. 1938), the 19th saden of the al-Abbas shrine. He had three sons, Nathum, Hashim and Adnan.

He republished the diwan of his ancestor Nasrallah al-Haeri in 1954.

== Death ==
He died on October 8, 1959 and was buried in one of the Nasrallah family crypts in the al-Abbas shrine.
