= Ahmed Shams al-Din al-Faizi =

Sayyid Ahmed Shams al-Din al-Fa'izi
- أحمد شمس الدين الفائزي

Minister of Ra's al-'Ayn
- In office 1334–1349
- Leader: Abu Sa'id Bahadur Khan

Personal life
- Died: 1349 Karbala, Ilkhanate
- Resting place: Ahmed Ibn Hashim Shrine
- Parent: Muhammad Abu al-Faiz (father)
- Other names: Abu Hashim (أبو هاشم); Nathir Ras al-Ayn (ناظر رأس العين)

Religious life
- Religion: Islam
- Denomination: Shīʿā

Sayyid Ahmed Shams al-Din bin Muhammad Abu al-Fa'iz al-Musawi al-Ha'iri (Arabic: أحمد شمس الدين بن محمد أبي الفائز الموسوي الحائري) also known as Ahmed ibn Hashim (Arabic: أحمد بن هاشم), was an Iraqi Alid noble from Karbala. He was the minister of Ra's al-'Ayn (now Ayn al-Tamr) in 1334.

== Family ==
He is the son of Muhammad Abu al-Faiz, the eponymic ancestor of the Al Faiz family, that is known today as Al Tumah, Al Nasrallah, Al Dhiya al-Din, Al Awj, Al Tajer, and Al Sayyid Amin (Jolokhan al-Faizi). His lineage is as follows:

Aḥmed Shams al-Din bin Moḥammed Abu al-Faʾiz bin Abu al-Ḥassan ʿAli bin Aḥmed Jalal al-Din bin Abu Jaʿfar Moḥammed bin Abu Jaʿfar Moḥammed bin Abu Jaʿfar Najm al-Din al-Aswad bin Abu Jaʿfar Moḥammed bin ʿAli al-Ghareeq bin Moḥammed al-Khair bin Abu al-Ḥassan ʿAli al-Majthoor bin Abu al-Ṭayyib Aḥmed bin Moḥammed al-Ḥaʾiri bin Ibrahim al-Mujāb bin Moḥammed al-ʿAābid bin Musa al-Kāthim.

== Biography ==
In c. 1311, the Ilkhanate minister, Rashid al-Din, called for Ahmed in Hilla, and ordered him to kill the naqib which they had instated over the Ilkhanate kingdom, Taj al-Din al-Awi al-Aftasi, and his two sons, Hussain and Ali. In return, he promised that he will make him naqib. Upon hearing this, Ahmed strongly refused, and fled that night to Karbala, and remained in hiding until Rashid al-Din's motive was exposed, in 1318.

He was appointed Minister of Ras al-Ayn (Shfatha) in 1334 by Bahadur Khan. He died in 1349, and has a shrine and mosque in northwest Shfatha.

== Ibn Hashim Shrine ==
al-Faizi's shrine now stands as the shrine of Sayyid Ahmed Ibn Hashim. In essence he is not Ibn (son of) Hashim, because his father was Muhammad Abu al-Fa'iz, but when people in that time wanted to show respect to an Alid, they would call him 'son of Hashim', and that stayed until his shrine become known as the shrine of Sayyid Ahmed Ibn Hashim.

=== Location ===
The shrine is considered to fall 25 kilometres north west of Shfatha (another name for Ayn al-Tamr), in the outskirts of the Karbala governate, near al-Rahaliyah. Close to Wadi al-Aswad, it is 75 kilometres west of Karbala. British orientalist, Gertrude Bell, mentions the shrine's location during her 1909 Iraq expedition.

=== Current build ===
The shrine building is rectangular in shape, which is 84.5 metres long by 45 metres wide. It incorporates the tomb building which occupies the central area of the shrine, which is rectangular in shape and being 22.5 metres long by 14.5 metres wide and its height is 6 metres. The precinct of the tomb lies in the middle of the Aafih building surmounted by an onion shaped dome supported by eight columns which have square cross section whose side is 65 centimetres long. The diameter of the dome is about 7 metres and its height is about 10 metres above the ground level of the dharih building. The dome has 8 windows around its neck and each window is I metre high and also I metre wide. The exterior of the dome is decorated with the beautiful kashani tiles and at its top end is a metallic pole with spheres of different sizes attached to it. The tomb building is preceded by an iwan whose facade consists of three pointed arches, the middle one being higher than the other two and covered from the outside with kashani tiles. The top line of the external facades of the tomb building is covered with kashani tiles with scripts from the Quran decorated in Arabesque style. The tomb building is surrounded by a vast open courtyard which itself is surrounded on its four sides by a roofed iwans whose front is surmounted by pointed arches and are used as rest places by pilgrims.

== See also ==
- Al Faiz Family
- Ibrahim al-Mujab
- Nasrallah al-Haeri
