= Jawad Nasrallah =

Custodian of Imam Husayn shrine

Sayyid Jawad Nasrallah
- السيد جواد نصر الله

21st Custodian of the Imam Husayn Shrine
- In office June 2, 1802 – January 2, 1808
- Preceded by: Musa al-Wahab
- Succeeded by: Ali al-Tawil Nasrallah

Personal details
- Born: Jawad Kadhim Nasrallah al-Faizi c. 1725 Karbala, Ottoman Empire
- Died: January 2, 1808 Karbala, Ottoman Empire
- Resting place: Imam Husayn Shrine
- Children: 1
- Relatives: Nasrallah al-Haeri (grandfather)

Sayyid Jawad Kadhim Nasrallah (Arabic: جواد كاظم آل نصر الله; died January 2, 1808) was an Arab nobleman from the Ottoman Empire that served as the 21st custodian of the Imam Husayn shrine from 1802 until 1808.

== Biography ==
Nasrallah was born c. 1725 to Kadhim Nasrallah. His grandfather Nasrallah al-Faizi, is the patriarch of the Nasrallah family, and a prominent scholar and poet. He hails from the noble Al Faiz family.

After Musa al-Wahab was killed in the sack of Karbala on April 22, 1802, some of the city's dignitaries, Sayyid Ali al-Tabatabei, Sayyid Murtadha Al Daraj (the naqib then), Sheikh Ali Abd al-Rasool (saden of the Abbas shrine), sent a transcript to the governor, Sulayman Pasha, requesting that Nasrallah be the saden of the Husayn shrine, and so on June 2, 1802, an imperial decree was issued declaring Nasrallah the saden of the Husayn shrine.

Due to his position, Nasrallah was sometimes known as Jawad al-Killidar (Arabic: الكليدار), which roots from the Persian words, kileet (Persian: كليت) and dar (Persian: دار), which translates to key holder. This was a name often given to those that take on the role of tending to holy shrines. However, Nasrallahs descendants did not carry the name, and remained with Nasrallah.

With the help of the son of Sayyid Muhammad Mehdi al-Shahristani (d. 1801), he combined the mosque that headquartered the Sunni mufti of Karbala with the grand courtyard, forcing the garrison of Karbala, Amin Agha Turk, to relocate the mufti to the small courtyard also known as the Buyid graveyard.

In 1804, he supervised the expansion of the precinct of the grave, adding Ibrahim al-Mujab's grave and rawaq (hallway) to the north west side of the precinct.

His son Ali al-Tawil (progenitor of House al-Tawil of Al Nasrallah), was appointed as saden, after his death.

== Death ==
Nasrallah died on Saturday, January 2, 1808, and was buried in the Al Nasrallah graveyard in the Imam Husayn shrine.

== See also ==
- Imam Husayn shrine
- Al Faiz family
