= Salman Tumah =

Iraqi historian and poet

Sayyid Dr. Salman Hadi Tumah
- سلمان هادي طعمة
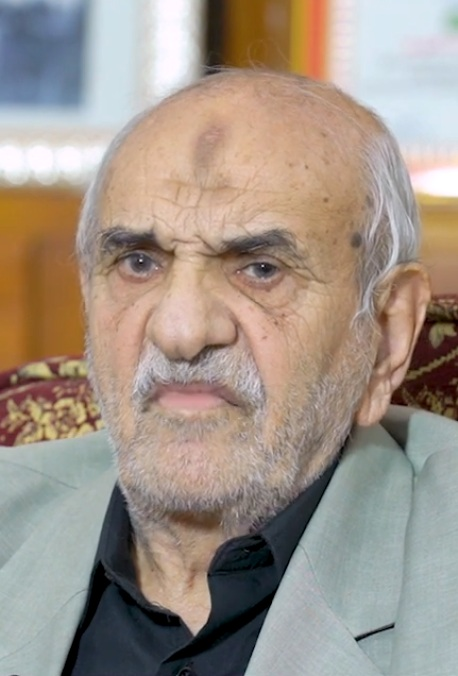
- Born: Salman Hadi Muhammad Tumah; 16 February 1935 (age 91); Karbala, Kingdom of Iraq
- Education: University of Baghdad (BA); The Islamic Civilization Open University (MA); Islamic University of Lebanon (MA); The Islamic Civilization Open University (PhD)
- Children: 2
- Writing career
- Notable works: Heritage of Karbala; Karbala in the memory The History of the Husayn and Abbas shrines

Sayyid Salman Hadi Tumah (Arabic: سلمان هادي آل طعمه; born 16 February 1935), is an Iraqi poet, writer, and historian.

He is considered Karbala's leading historian, writing a plethora of records on the city's history and heritage, as well its inhabitants and notables.

== Early life and education ==
Tumah was born on 16 February 1935, to Hadi Tumah and to the daughter of Ahmed Tumah. He hails from the noble Al Faiz family, and claims agnatic descent from Muhammad's daughter Fatimah and her husband, Ali, the first Shia Imam. His grandfather, Salih Tumah (d. 1901) was a member of the governing council of Karbala in the late Ottoman era.

He had both an academic and religious primary education. His religious education was held at the Imam Husayn shrine, and he was taught Quran by Sheikh Hasan Kusa; Arabic by Sheikh Abd al-Husayn al-Baydhani, and Islamic History by Sayyid Abd al-Husayn al-Killidar. He graduated from Karbala High School in 1951. He then graduated from the Teachers' Institute in 1959, and was assigned as a teacher in a number of Karbala's schools. He then completed his education in the Psychology department of the University of Baghdad, graduating with a BA in 1971.

A while after his retirement, he went to Lebanon and graduated with a MA. In 2009, he received his PhD from The Islamic Civilization Open University, and a year later, graduated with a second MA from the Islamic University of Lebanon, with his dissertation being about Sufi exegesis of the Quran (Ibn Arabi).

== Career ==
He set up a literary society along with a group of laureates named The Middle Euphrates Association in 1956, and it remained until 1959.

He worked as a teacher in the 1960s, and retired in 1985, to then become a full-time researcher. His research consisted of history, genealogy, and religious theology.

He received a 48 ijaza's in narrating hadiths from notable scholars such as Agha Bozorg Tehrani, Muhammad-Mehdi al-Isfahani, Shihab al-Din al-Mar'ashi, Yusuf al-Khurasani, Muhammad-Mehdi al-Khirsan, Husayn al-Mahfudh, Muhammad-Saeed al-Hakim, Sadiq al-Shirazi, Ishaq al-Fayadh and others.

== Works ==
=== Books ===
Tumah has published over seventy books, spanning between literature, poetry, and history. He also has more than 30 books in manuscript format. Some of his most notable works include:

- Turath Karbala [Karbala's Heritage] (1964 & 1983 & 2011).
- Karbala Fi al-Thakirah [Karbala in the memory]. (1982)
- A'lam al-Shu'ara' al-Abbasiyeen [Notable Abbasid Poets] (1987).
- Asha'er Karbala Wa Usariha [Families and Tribes of Karbala] (1998).
- Mu'jam Khutaba' Karbala [Glossary of Karbalaei Orators] (1999).
- Kaarbala Athna' Thawrat al-Ishreen [Karbalaei during the 1920 revolt] (2000).
- Diwan Abul Mahasin al-Karbalaei. Compilation of poetry by Muhammad-Hasan Abu al-Mahasin.
- Diwan Sheikh Muhsin Abu al-Hab.
- Diwan Jawad Bedget.

=== Poetry ===
Tumah has also written number of poems, and some of his notable poems include:

- A poem in mourning the tragic bloodbath of Husayn, that starts with:

أتـنـسـى الـحـسـيـنَ وأصحابَه
فسلْ (كربلاء) وأشـجانَها
وتــلــكَ الــديــارُ وأطــلالُـهـا
تـنـوحُ وتـنـدبُ سـلـوانَـها

Translation:

If you forget Husayn and his companions,
Then ask Karbala and its sorrows.
Those homes and its rises,
Weep and mourn its joy.

- A poem about the valiant stand of Karbala in the 1920 revolt, that starts with:

يا (كربلاء) وأنـتِ فـخـرُ قداسةٍ
يـسـتـوجبُ التعظيمَ والتبجيلا
يا موطنَ الأحرارِ مـنه تـألّـفـتْ
سورُ الجهادِ وفُصِّلتْ تفصيلا

Translation:

O' Karbala, you are the pride of all that is sacred,
You deserve the pride and honour.
O' nation of the free, that erected,
The wall of holy war.

== Personal life ==
Tumah is married to his cousin, the daughter of Muhammad Ahmed Tumah, and has two children. His son, Ahmed is a professor in electrical engineering, having achieved his doctorate from Brunel University, and teaches at the University of Karbala. His cousin and brother-in-law, Adnan Tumah (d. 2021) is a professor of Andalusian history and literature.
