= Al Faiz family =

Noble Alid family from Karbala

House of Faiz آل فائز Faizids
- Parent house: A branch of Ibrahim al-Mujab, of Musawi, of Banu Hashim, of Quraysh
- Founded: 861; 1165 years ago in Karbala
- Founder: Ibrahim al-Mujab; Mohammed Abu al-Faiz
- Current head: Tumah: Muhi Mustafa Tumah; Nasrallah: Muhammad-Hussain Muhammad-Ali Nasrallah; Dhiya al-Din: Abd al-Ridha Kadhim Dhiya al-Din
- Titles: Naqib al-Ashraf; Saden al-Rawdhat; Ra'is al-Ha'ir; Hakim Karbala
- Estates: Mahalat Al Faiz, Fidan al-Sada, Maal Yunis, Umm Ramila, Bustan Dhway, Maal Ju'an

The family of Al Faiz (Arabic: آل فائز, romanized: ʾĀl Fāʾiz; /ˈɑːl fɑːɪz/), also transliterated in a number of other ways, including Al Fa'iz, Al Fa'ez, Al Faez, or Al Fayez, is the oldest Alid family of Karbala, which they have occupied, on some occasions ruled, and held custodianship of its holy sites, since 861.

The family traces its lineage to Ibrahim al-Mujab, the 9th-century grandson of Musa al-Kadhim, the seventh Imam in Twelver Shia Islam. Its eponymous ancestor is held to be Muhammad Abu al-Faiz, a twelfth-generation descendant of al-Mujab. In Karbala, the family holds a high prestige where they maintained the authority of the niqaba (supervision) of Karbala's Sayyids and the sidana (custodianship) of Karbala's holy sites numerous times over different periods.

Today, the wider family is represented by several branches, and they are Al Tumah, Al Nasrallah, Al Dhiya al-Din, Al Tajir, Al Awj, and Al Sayyid Amin.

== History ==
=== Alid settlement in Karbala ===
Following the assassination of the Abbasid caliph al-Mutawakkil in 861, the Alids experienced a period of relative security under his son and successor, al-Muntasir, who is reported to have shown them favour and afforded them protection. The earliest known Alid to settle in Karbala was Ibrahim al-Mujab ibn Muhammad al-Abid ibn Musa al-Kadhim, also known as Taj al-Din Ibrahim al-Mujab.

=== Sidana and Niqaba ===
Following the settlement of the Alids in Karbala, Ibrahim al-Mujab assumed responsibility for the two holy shrines of Husayn ibn Ali and Abbas ibn Ali. Through this role, he became known as the sādin al-rawḍatayn, meaning the custodian of the two shrines. The office itself came to be known as the sidāna, referring to the custodianship and administration of the holy sanctuaries.

The sidāna was inherited by al-Mujab’s eldest son, Muhammad, who was nicknamed al-Ha'iri owing to the family’s residence in the Ha'ir, another name for Karbala. He assumed the office in 913. The custodianship was then transmitted through the following descendants:

- Ahmed Abu al-Tayyib (962–995)
- Ali al-Majthoor (995–1029)
- Ahmed al-Ha'iri (1029–1068)
- Ibrahim al-Ha'iri (1068–1097)
- After Ibrahim al-Ha'iri, the sidāna passed to a Sayyid from the descendants of Ali Zayn al-Abidin, and subsequently to various other figures. It later returned to the descendants of Ibrahim al-Mujab through Muhammad Abu al-Faiz in 1259.

In the late 10th century, during the Buyid period, the office of naqib al-ashraf was established in Karbala. The naqib al-ashraf was the recognised head or supervisor of the descendants of the Islamic prophet Muhammad, and the institution itself was known as the niqāba. Muhammad al-Husayni, a descendant of Ali Zayn al-Abidin, was appointed to this office and became the first naqib of the Ha'ir.

After al-Husayni, the office passed in around 985 to Sharaf al-Din Ahmad, a descendant of Ibrahim al-Mujab. He was succeeded by his son, Ibrahim al-Ha'iri, who assumed the niqāba in 1001. Following Ibrahim’s death in 1049, the office passed to other Sayyids, before returning to the line of Ibrahim al-Mujab through Muhammad Abu al-Faiz in 1259.

At certain periods in Karbala’s history, the offices of niqāba and sidāna appear to have been merged. In such cases, the holder of the niqāba also served as sādin of the two holy shrines.

=== Tribal feud ===
By 1317, the Ilkhanate state had begun to disintegrate, leaving the Euphrates region without a stable central authority. In this context, Karbala became divided between two principal factions: Al Faiz and Al Zuhayk. Al Faiz traced their descent to Muhammad al-Abid ibn Musa al-Kadhim, while Al Zuhayk descended from Ibrahim al-Asghar ibn Musa al-Kadhim. The rivalry between the two groups developed into a prolonged feud that continued for nearly half a century. The Moroccan traveller Ibn Battuta witnessed the unrest during his visit to Karbala in 1326.

Al Faiz were the older-established group in Karbala, owing their presence in the city to Ibrahim al-Mujab, who settled there in 861 during the reign of al-Muntasir. Although numerous branches descended from al-Mujab, Muhammad Abu al-Faiz later emerged as the leading patriarch of the wider family in Karbala. Since the feud began during the latter part of Abu al-Faiz’s life, the faction known as Al Faiz cannot have consisted solely of his direct descendants. Rather, it appears to have included several related branches of his wider kin, united under his name.

Al Zuhayk, by contrast, were named after their patriarch Yahya Zuhayk, a descendant of Abdullah al-Ha'iri, the naqib of the Talibids who had moved to Karbala in the early 11th century. The descendants of Ibrahim al-Asghar appear to have united under the name of their kinsman Yahya Zuhayk. In later generations, Al Zuhayk became represented by several families, including Al Thabit, Al Daraj (later known as Al Naqib) and Al Wahab. The families of Al Eshaiker and Al Jelokhan were also related to Al Zuhayk and became associated with their name.

The dispute centred on the office of the niqāba in Karbala. Al Faiz regarded the office as belonging to them on account of their earlier residence in the city, while Al Zuhayk claimed entitlement to it on the basis that their ancestors had previously held the niqāba of the Talibids of Iraq.

Amid the continuing disorder caused by the feud, and in the absence of effective central authority, a tribe known as Al Muhanna invaded Karbala in 1355, claiming that their intention was to end the unrest. They took control of the city and its holy sites, and Shihab al-Din Al Muhanna declared himself naqib of the Ha'ir.

When Al Faiz and Al Zuhayk realised the extent of Al Muhanna’s control, they set aside their rivalry and joined forces against the invaders. Their revolt succeeded in removing the naqib and expelling him and his tribe from the city. Following this, the two factions formed an alliance and agreed to divide the principal offices of Karbala between them. Muhammad Sharaf al-Din, the grandson of Muhammad Abu al-Faiz, became governor of Karbala and sādin al-rawḍatayn, while Abu al-Qasim Muhammad, the son of Yahya Zuhayk, became naqib. The alliance was further strengthened through intermarriage between the two families.

=== Attire and distinctive dress ===
In the 9th century, the Alids of Karbala are said to have worn traditional Arab garments, including the turban, thawb, and bisht, in a variety of colours, although green appears to have been especially common. In 1372, Sultan Shaban introduced a form of noble distinction for the Alids by granting them the privilege of wearing green turbans, thereby distinguishing them from the black colour associated with the Abbasids.

With the growing popularity of the fez in Ottoman Iraq during the 19th century, Hassan Nasrallah is said to have imported fezzes from Vienna and green woollen shawls from England. From these, he developed what became known as the kashida: a fez around which a green scarf was wrapped. The kashida, together with the jubba, a long sleeved robe similar to a cassock but without buttons, became the distinctive dress of the Faizids. It was subsequently adopted as the official attire of the sadens and servants of the shrines of Husayn and Abbas in Karbala, before spreading to other shrine cities in Iraq.

The style of the kashida varies between Karbala and other shrine cities. In Karbala, the green scarf is longer and covers approximately half of the fez, with the wrapping arranged in an overlapping manner that gives the front a distinctive appearance. In Najaf, the wrapping is shorter, though it still retains a visible overlap. In Samarra, the wrap is shorter still and lacks the overlapping front, forming instead a more uniform band around the fez.

== Figures ==
=== Epithets ===
It is worthy to note that the notable figures of Al Faiz had the addition of al-Husayni (descendants of Husayn) to their name until the 16th century. This then changed to al-Musawi (descendants of Musa) in the following centuries.

=== Muhammad Abu al-Faiz ===
He is:

Moḥammed Abu al-Faʾiz bin Abu al-Ḥassan ʿAli bin Aḥmed Jalal al-Din bin Abu Jaʿfar Moḥammed bin Abu Jaʿfar Moḥammed bin Abu Jaʿfar Najm al-Din al-Aswad bin Abu Jaʿfar Moḥammed bin ʿAli al-Ghareeq bin Moḥammed al-Khair bin Abu al-Ḥassan ʿAli al-Majthoor bin Abu al-Ṭayyib Aḥmed bin Moḥammed al-Ḥaʾiri bin Ibrahim al-Mujāb bin Moḥammed al-ʿAābid bin Musa al-Kāthim.

He is the progenitor of the Tumah, Nasrallah, Dhiya al-Din, Tajir, Awj and Sayyid Amin families. He is reported to have been a valiant and noble man, followed by the majority of the city. He was the one that united all of the branches from the descendants of al-Mujab, that resided in Karbala, under his name. Abu al-Faiz owned vast lands across Karbala and Shfatha. In 1259, under the rule of Hulegu, he was made naqib and ruler of Karbala, at the behest of al-Muhaqqiq al-Hilli. He died in c. 1317.

=== Ahmed Shams al-Din al-Faizi ===
He was the son of Abu al-Faiz. He was appointed Minister of Ras al-Ayn (Ayn al-Tamr) in 1334 until his death in 1349.

=== Muhammad Sharaf al-Din al-Faizi ===
He was the son of Ahmed Shams al-Din. After the exile of the al-Muhanna tribe in the last third of the 14th-century, Muhammad was made ruler of Karbala. In 1393, when Timur Lang's forces, under the command of his son Miran Shah, defeated Ahmed Jalayir, they entered Karbala, to which they were met with its noblemen, headed by Muhammad who was ruling the city. Just before the Timurid invasion, the saden, Shaykh Ali al-Khazin, had died, Miran saw that the most appropriate person to hold the sidana was Muhammad, so he appointed him as saden of the Husayn and Abbas shrines', in 1393.

In 1412, tensions grew between the Alid and non-Alid tribes as to the matters of the shrines'. For this reason Muhammad formed a number of groups, each representing a tribe, and designated a sarkoshk (leading minister) to lead each group.

=== Tumah I Kamal al-Din al-Faizi ===
He was the son of Ahmed III Abu Tiraas, the son of Yahya Dhiya al-Din, the son of Muhammad Sharaf al-Din. In 1423, Tumah I assumed the niqaba of the ashraf of Karbala, as well as the sidana of the Husayn and Abbas shrines' at the behest of the governor of Baghdad, Shah Muhammad, of the Black Sheep Turcomen tribe. Tumah died in 1442.

=== Sharaf al-Din al-Faizi ===
He was the son of Tumah I. Sharaf al-Din took the niqaba and sidana after his father, died in 1442, during the Black Sheep monarchy, and carried on during the White Sheep monarchy. He passed down the niqaba and sidana to his son, Yahya, in 1493. He died in 1500. Iraqi historian, Dr. Imad Rauf in his book, al-Usar al-Hakima, mentions he holds a document that has both Sharaf al-Din's name and Sultan Yaqub's, dated from 1455.

=== Yahya al-Faizi ===
He was the son of Sharaf al-Din. In 1493, Yahya took charge of the niqaba and sidana after his father. He died in 1536.

=== Taj al-Din al-Faizi ===
He was the son of Tumah I. After the death of his nephew, Yahya in 1536, Taj al-Din took charge of the niqaba and sidana. He was naqib and saden until his death in 1556.

=== Alam al-Din al-Faizi ===
He was the son of Tumah II, the son of Sharaf al-Din. In 1573, the Sublime Porte issued a firman, appointing Alam al-Din as the minister of Charitable Endowments of Karbala. In November, 1589, he signed a power of attorney over all of his possessions to his son, Jameel; the document was witnessed by Muhammad-Ali al-Eshaiker and four other noblemen. He died in 1598.

=== Nasrallah al-Faizi ===
He was the son of Husayn, the son of Ali, the son of Yunis, the son of Jameel, the son of Alam al-Din. Nasrallah was a senior jurist, teacher, poet, author and annalist. He was the patriarch of the Nasrallah family.

=== Mehdi al-Faizi ===
He was the son of Hasan, the son of Mansur, the son of Nasir al-Din, the son of Yunis, the son of Jameel, the son of Alam al-Din. He was made saden of the Husayn shrine in 1752, until his death in 1790.

=== Muhammad-Ali 'Abu Ridin' al-Faizi ===
He was the son of Muhammad-Musa, the son of Darwish, the son of Sharaf al-Din III, the son of Abbas, the son of Hashim, the son of Muhammad, the son of Sharaf al-Din (naqib and saden). He was named Abu Ridin (transl. one with the sleeve) as he used to wear a unique cassock-like dress, similar to ones worn by knights and leaders. When Muhammad-Ali Tumah abandoned the sidana to become vice governor of Karbala in 1821, Abu Ridin was assigned as saden of the Husayn shrine, at the behest of his father-in-law, the naqib, Husayn Daraj al-Naqib. However, when the governor of Baghdad, Dawud Pasha returned from the Ottoman-Persian war, he replaced Abu Ridin with Wahab Tumah in 1823. Abu Ridin had a large role in the Battle of Menakhur in 1826, and because of the Karbalaeis victory over the Ottomans, he was reinstated in August 1826. He died in 1829.

== Al Tumah ==
Al Tumah (Arabic: آل طعمة, romanized: ʾĀl Ṭuʿma; /ˈɑːl tʊˈmɑː/) branched off Tumah III al-Faizi. They own the famous muqata'a Fidan al-Sada which Tumah III endowed to his descendants on September 26, 1616, after it was granted to him by Sheikh Ahmed al-Nahawi. It is worthy to note that, it is a khairi endowment, i.e. devoted to a charitable purpose from its inception, rather than for the benefit of his descendants. The family held custodianship of the Husayn shrine numerously throughout the last four centuries. It is currently one of the largest Alid families in Karbala. The family branched into five clans:

- Al Wahab
- Al Mustafa (from this clan branched out Al Qotob, Al Fathallah and Al Urzuq)
- Al Darwish (from this clan branched out Al Killidar, Al Sarkhadamah, and Al Rozekhan)
- Al Muhammad (from this clan branched out Al Shurufi and Al Khemgeh)
- Al Jawad

=== Notable members ===
- Khalifah bin Nimatullah (died 1697) was the grandson of Tumah III, he became the first of the descendants of Tumah III to hold the niqaba of Karbala, and this was in 1680. His grandson, Abbas also became naqib in 1773, but he died two months later.
- Muhammad bin Jafar was the saden of the Abbas shrine in 1834 until 1838.
- Wahab bin Muhammad-Ali (1801–1846) was the governor of Karbala and saden of the Husayn shrine from 1823 until 1826, and then reinstated in 1831 until 1842. He was also the saden of the Abbas shrine from 1826 until 1829. A plague epidemic in Iraq led to his death on August 29, 1846.
- Jawad al-Killidar bin Hasan (died 1891) was the saden of the Husayn shrine in 1875 until his death in 1891. His descendants took his epithet - al-Killidar (holder of the key) - as their family name, and are known as al-Killidar or al-Killidar Tumah.
- Ali bin Jawad al-Killidar (died 1900) was the saden of the Husayn shrine in 1891 until his death in 1900.
- Muhammad-Hassan bin Kadhim (1864–1945) was a religious scholar and orator. He was a leader in the Iraqi revolt of 1920, and the first person to raise the Arab (Iraqi) flag over Karbala's civic centre, causing his arrest by the British. He was freed at the behest of a senior cleric. He died whilst on pilgrimage to Imam Ridha in Mashhad, in 1945, and his corpse was returned and buried in Karbala.
- Abd al-Husayn bin Ali al-Killidar (1881–1961) was the saden of the Husayn shrine in 1900, until he passed it down to his son, Abd al-Salih in 1927. He was also an author, and wrote a number of books, including Baghiyat al-Nubala Fi Tarikh Karbala and Nash'at al-Adyan al-Samawiya.
- Dr. Abd al-Jawad bin Ali al-Killidar (1892–1959) was a doctor in Islamic history, and authored a number of books on the history of Karbala, including Tarikh Karbala and Ha'ir al-Husayn. He founded the al-Ahrar newspaper in the 1930s.
- Abd al-Razzaq bin Abd al-Wahaab al-Wahaab (1895–1958) was a distinguished writer and publisher, most famous for his three volume book, Karbala Fi al-Tarikh (Karbala in History).
- Abd al-Saleh bin Abd al-Husayn al-Killidar (1911–2005) was a saden of the Husayn shrine in 1930 until he retired in 1981.
- Muhammad-Hassan bin Mustafa al-Killidar (1913–1995) was a celebrated author, most famous for his book Madinat al-Husayn (City of Hussain) which narrates a great deal of detail about the history of Karbala in numerous volumes. He was an advocate for women's rights, and issued a chain of articles titled 'The necessity of liberating women according to Islam'.
- Muhammad-Mehdi bin Abd al-Wahaab al-Wahaab (1914–1985) was an Iraqi lawyer, journalist and politician from Karbala. He practised law in Baghdad, served as a representative of the Arab Youth Forum Association, and founded the newspaper Al-Nadwa in 1941. He was later elected as a member of the Iraqi Chamber of Deputies for Karbala, serving until the fall of the monarchy in 1958.
- Dr. Saleh bin Jawad (born 1929) is a doctor of Arabic and Comparative Literature. He is professor emeritus of East Asian Languages and Cultures at Indiana University, and has been associated with the university since 1964.
- Dr. Salman bin Hadi (born 1935) is a renowned author and poet. He is a graduate of Baghdad University's college of education, with many leading books on the history and culture of Karbala, as well as its notable figures.
- Dr. Adnan bin Jawad (born 1941) is a doctor in Language. He is a professor at Philipps-Universität Marburg. He has authored a number of books and publications, focusing on Arabic calligraphy and religious manuscripts.
- Adel bin Abd al-Saleh al-Killidar (born 1942) was the saden of the Husayn shrine in 1981 until 1991. He was studying for his PhD in Cairo in 1979, however he left it to attend to his duty as saden, at the behest of his father.
- Dr. Mustafa bin Sadiq is a Clinical Associate Professor at UBC and is a Heart Failure/Heart Transplant cardiologist at St. Paul's Hospital. He completed his Internal Medicine and Cardiology training at the University of Alberta and his Heart Transplant fellowship at the Cleveland Clinic. He subsequently completed a Master of Science in Clinical Epidemiology at the Harvard School of Public Health. He is the Director of the Cardiac Intensive Care Unit at St. Paul's Hospital in Vancouver.
- Dr. Husayn bin Ali al-Killidar is a pulmonologist in Woodstown, and is affiliated with multiple hospitals in the area, including Cooper University Health Care-Camden and Salem Medical Centre. He received his medical degree from University of Baghdad College of Medicine and has been in practice for more than 20 years.

== Al Nasrallah ==
Al Nasrallah (Arabic: آل نصرالله, romanized: ʾĀl NaṣrĀllāh; /ˈɑːl nʌsrʌllɑː/) branched off Nasrallah al-Faizi. They own vast lands across Ayn al-Tamur and Karbala. Their grandfather Yunis al-Faizi excelled in business, and managed to purchase the muqata'a Maal Yunis which extended from the borders of Arba' Nahran to al-Jayya to Umm al-'Agareeg in Bab al-Salalma. He endowed his muqata'a to his descendants for their benefit. The family at some point held custodianship of the Husayn and Abbas shrines, and is the only Alid family that had the right to serve in both shrines. It is also the only Alid family to have three designated crypts in the Husayn shrine, the first is behind the grave of Ibrahim al-Mujab, opposite the Royal Qajari crypt, the second is besides the qatlgah (place where Husayn was slaughtered), and the third is near the tomb of Husayn's companions. It is also one of the largest Alid families in Karbala. The family branched into five clans:

- Al Muhammad
- Al Ahmed
- Al Tawil
- Al Salih
- Al Muhammad-Ali

=== Notable members ===
- Jawad bin Kathim (died 1808) was the saden of the Husayn shrine after the sack of Karbala, in 1802 until his death in 1808.
- Ali al-Tawil bin Jawad (died 1851) was the saden of the Husayn shrine after his father Jawad, upon the royal decree issued by Sulayman Pasha, from 1808 until he was replaced on the orders of Fath Ali Qajar in 1810, because he was allegedly too young. His descendants took his epithet - al-Tawil (the tall) - as their family name, and are known as 'al-Tawil' or 'al-Tawil Nasrallah'.
- Ahmed bin Nasrallah (died 1872) was the saden of the Abbas shrine after 1863 until before 1868.
- Ali bin Ahmed was a custodian of the Imam Husayn shrine, and a co-founder of the Coalition Party (Arabic: تجمع الحلف) in 1907, that sought to challenge the Ottoman government in Iraq, and eventually topple it.
- Baqir bin Salih (died 1886) was an Islamic missionary, that played a big role in the conversion of many of Talafar to Shia Islam. He was known to have a remarkable level of physical strength, it is narrated on the account of Sayyid Ibrahim al-Isfahani in Sayyid Muhammad al-Hindi an-Najafi's kashkool (diary), that "Sayyid Baqir was known for his exceptional strength, for he would stand on one leg on the edge of a well, and no man would be able to push him into the well.".
- Muhammad bin Sultan (died 1901) also known as Hammoud, was head of the traders of Karbala in the Ottoman era, before the introduction of the chamber of commerce. He was an affluent man, and owned a whole parade along Bayn al-Haramayn. He was married to Amna Thabit, the granddaughter of Muhammad-Ali Thabit, the 10th saden of the Abbas shrine, as well as the great-granddaughter of Dowlatshah .
- Hassan bin Muhammad (1881–1959) was an activist, and affluent businessman. He was a member of the High Council of Military Affairs during the Iraqi revolt of 1920. He continued his activism in Iraqi Renaissance Party until it was disbanded in the late 1920s.
- Hashem bin Husayn (died 1959) was a socialite, and political activist. He was active in his resistance to the British in the 1920 revolt, and worked closely with Muhammad Sa'id al-Habboubi. He later became the representative of grand Ayatollah Hakim in Karbala. After his death, his brother, Sayyid Rasheed became the representative of Hakim.
- Dr. Murtadha bin Nasir (1922–2005) was a doctor of law, he worked as a professor at the University of Baghdad's business school. He was a celebrated author, writing some of the leading books on corporation law.
- Hashem bin Hassan (1923–1997) was the chairman of the Karbala Chamber of Commerce for six terms from 1959 to 1969. He supervised al-Iqtisad magazine that issued its first magazine on 15 July 1960. He founded the Chamber's library in 1963.
- Dr. Hadi bin Ibrahim al-Tawil (born 1932) is a physician, graduated from Istanbul Medical School in 1956, specialising in paediatrics and radiology. Over his extensive career, he held pivotal roles in Karbala and Baghdad's healthcare system, including at Al-Hussein Hospital, Al-Abbas Clinic, and later as Director of the Arab Children's Hospital and Saddam Hussein Central Hospital (now Al-Iskan Central Pediatric Teaching Hospital). After retiring, he ran a private clinic before relocating to the USA due to safety concerns during Iraq's turbulent period.
- Muhammad-Husayn bin Muhammad-Ali (born 1951) is a judge, prosecutor, and served as the president of the courts of appeal in four different Iraqi provinces, as well as a general Judicial Supervisor. He is currently the chief of the Nasrallah family.
- Dr. Hasan bin Ali (born 1951) is a doctor of internal medicine, and the dean of the Medical College of the University of Karbala. He completed his primary studies in the Hashemiyah School in 1963, and his secondary studies in Baghdad College in 1968. He graduated from the University of Baghdad in 1974 with a degree in medicine. He received a diploma in internal medicine from the same university in 1987. He obtained Arab Board certification in Internal Medicine at Yarmouk University in 1988. He has served as a specialist doctor at the Husayni Hospital since 1988, and held numerous positions there, including director of the hospital between 1994–95 and 2003–05.
- Abd al-Saheb bin Nasir (born 1953) was the saden of the Husayn shrine from 1992 to 2003. He is also an author with many published books, mostly about the history and culture of Karbala.
- Dr. Hashim bin Muhammad al-Tawil (born 1955) is a doctor of art history, he is the Tenured Professor and Chair of Art History Area Studies at Henry Ford College, Dearborn, MI. He has also been an advisory board member at the Arab Cultural Studies Program in Henry Ford College since 2011, and a board of directors member in the Asian & Islamic Art Forum of the Detroit Institute of Arts since 2006.
- Aref bin Muhammad (born 1958) is a social activist, he is the chairman of the al-Wala' wal-Fida' wal-Fath Association. He is currently the director of Ayatollah Shirazi's public relations office in Iraq.
- Dr. Salam bin Abd al-Husayn (born 1981) is a consultant Hepato-Pancreatico-Biliary (HPB) and liver transplant surgeon at the Royal Free Hospital, specialising in complex liver, gallbladder, and pancreatic conditions, including cancer and hernias. A graduate of Oxford University Medical School, he completed groundbreaking research during his PhD, published in Nature. Recognised internationally, he received the Medawar Medal and was named a Rising Star by the International Liver Transplantation Society in 2017. With over a decade of experience, he has performed more than 3,500 surgeries.

== Al Dhiya al-Din ==
Al Dhiya al-Din (Arabic: آل ضياء الدين, romanized: ʾĀl Ḍhiyaʾ āl-Din; /ˈɑːl ðɪjɑː ˈæl diːn/) branched off Dhiya al-Din al-Faizi. They own lands in Umm Ramila in Shfatha, and in Karbala, they own the famous Dhway grove, which they were on some occasions named after. In 1799, the grove was endowed by Yahya, to his son, Dhiya al-Din and his descendants, for the benefit of the Husayn Shrine. In 1953, it was purchased by the city council, and made a public park. The family held the custodianship of the Abbas shrine numerous times throughout the 20th century.

=== Notable members ===
- Husayn bin Muhammad-Ali (died 1871) was the saden of the Abbas shrine in 1868 until his death in 1871.
- Mustafa bin Husayn (died 1879) was the saden of the Abbas shrine after his father's death, until his death in 1879.
- Murtadha bin Mustafa (1869–1938) was the saden of the Abbas shrine after his father's death, until his death in 1938. When his father died, he was still too young to take on the duty of the sidana, so it was held by Muhammad-Mehdi Tumah until he was reported to the governor of Baghdad, Abd al-Rahman Pasha. Abd al-Rahman reinstated Murtadha, upon receiving the news. He also issued a firman to solidify Murtadha's position, however, his uncle Abbas Dhiya al-Din took responsibility, until Murtadha came of age, as he was only ten years old.
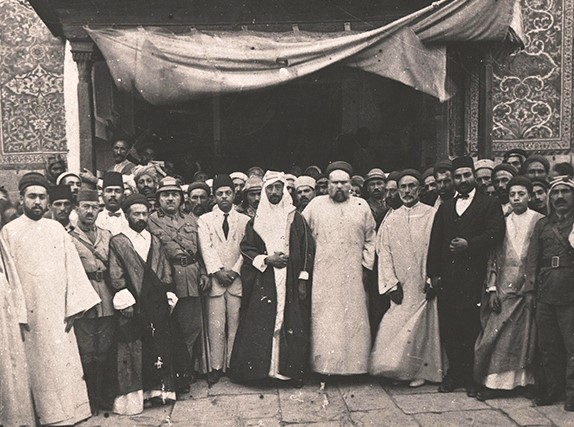
  Murtadha Dhiya al-Din (centre right) during his sidanate with King Faisal I (centre) in the Abbas shrine, 1921.
- Muhammad-Hassan bin Murtadha (died 1953) was the saden of the Abbas shrine after his father's death in 1938.
- Badr al-Din bin Muhammad-Hassan (died 1985), also known as Badri, was the saden of the Abbas shrine after his father's death in 1953. He retired from his responsibilities in 1982.
- Muhammad-Husayn bin Mehdi was the saden of the Abbas shrine in 1982 until 1991.
- Ahmed bin Abbod (died 2015) was a renowned merchant. He opened a number of businesses in mulk (parade) Al Nasrallah. He is the first person to bring the radio and television to Karbala. He was known as balur (crystal) because he owned a large crystal store. He was the chief of the Dhiya al-Din family until his death.
- Mustafa bin Murtadha is the current secretary-general of the Abbas shrine, since 2022.
- Dr. Alaa bin Ahmed (born 1965) is the Director of the Imam Husayn Museum and has served as Deputy Secretary-General of the Imam Husayn Shrine since 2022. He earned a PhD with distinction from the University of Babylon in 2021 for his thesis on "The Aesthetics of Panoramic Composition," which integrates virtual reality to depict the events of Karbala.

== Al Tajir ==
Al Tajir (Arabic: آل تاجر, romanized: ʾĀl Tāǧir; /ˈɑːl tɑːdʒɪr/) branched off Ali 'al-Tajir' al-Faizi. Ali was named al-Tajir (the merchant), due to his frequent travels to East Asia for trade. The family owns farms known as Umm al-Sudan in mahalat Al Faiz (now known as al-Hayabi), that Hassan al-Tajir endowed to his descendants in 1680. The family served in the holy Husayn and Abbas shrines'.

=== Notable members ===
- Muhammad bin Ali was the sarkoshk of the Ha'iri group of custodians of the two shrines in the late 19th century.
- Ali bin Muhammad-Ali (born 1962) is a painter and art historian. He studied at the College of Fine Arts at the University of Baghdad, ultimately earning a master's degree in drawing. He is currently a celebrated artist with his award-winning series, ‘Babylon’, which fuses scenes from daily urban life in Iraq with symbolic characters and objects.

== Al Awj ==
Al Awj (Arabic: آل عوج, romanized: ʾĀl ʿAwǧ; /ˈɑːl ˈuːdʒ/) branched off Muhsin Awj al-Faizi, who branched off Msa'id al-Faizi. They have a partful ownership in Tumah III's Fidan al-Sada muqata'a. They also own parts of the farms known as Maal al-Saghir, in mahalat Al Faiz, endowed in 1847 and Maal Ju'an, near mahalat Al Faiz, endowed in 1853. The family served in the holy Husayn and Abbas shrines'.

=== Notable members ===
- Abd al-Amir bin Jawad (1958–2011) was an author and poet. He obtained a BSc in Project Planning and Management and pursued a career in writing and journalism. He has authored numerous books, including leading books on genealogy and Islamic folklore. He disappeared in 2011, and has been missing since.

== Al Sayyid Amin (Jolokhan) ==
Al Sayyid Amin (Arabic: آل سيد أمين, romanized: ʾĀl Sayyid Āmin; /ˈɑːl seɪjɪd ɛmiːn/) branched off Muhammad-Amin al-Faizi, also known as Sayyid Amin al-Faizi. They also own lands in Ayn al-Tamur that Muhammad-Amin endowed to his descendants in 1703. The family have an official Ottoman firman confirming this. The family served in the holy Husayn and Abbas shrines'. In the late 19th century, they became known as Al Jolokhan al-Faizi, as there was a large open space near where they lived, and in Persian it was known as a jolokhan (Persian: جلوخان). They are not to be mistaken by Al Jolokhan from Al Zuhayk, who also lived near the jolokhan, in Bab al-Taag.

=== Notable members ===
- Murtadha bin Baqir was a nobleman and leader. He was a celebrated warrior during the Battle of Menakhur in 1826. He headed the Bab al-Mukhayyam battalion, and managed to keep the Ottomans out of the city for most of the battle.
- Muhammad bin Baqir was a member of the board of governors of Karbala in 1885 until 1889.
- Muhammad bin Muhammad-Ali (1928–2007) was a renowned cleric and orator. He was the maternal grandson of grand Ayatollah Muhammad-Husayn al-Shahrestani.
- Hasan bin Muhammad-Ali (1934–2023) was a theatrical producer, director, and actor. His theatrical career started in the 1940s, and by 1960, headed the theatrical movement in Karbala.

== Family Tree ==
Hashim
Abdul-Muttalib
Abu Talib	Abdullah
Muhammad (Islamic prophet)
Ali (1st Imam)	Fatimah
Husayn (3rd Imam)
Ali (4th Imam)
Muhammad (5th Imam)
Jafar (6th Imam)
Musa (7th Imam)
Muhammad al-Abid
Ibrahim al-Mujab; Custodian of Husayn & Abbas shrines' 861–913 (First Alid to settle in Karbala)
Muhammad al-Hairi; Custodian of Husayn & Abbas shrines' 913–963
Abu al-Tayyib Ahmed; Custodian of Husayn & Abbas shrines' 963–995
Ali al-Majthoor; Custodian of Husayn & Abbas shrines' 995–1029
Muhammad al-Khayr
Ali al-Ghareeq
Muhammad I
Muhammad II Al-Thair
Najm al-Din al-Aswad
Muhammad III
Muhammad IV
Ahmed I Jalal al-Din
Abu al-Hasan Ali
Muhammad V Abu al-Faiz; Naqib al-Hair (eponymous ancestor)
Ahmed II Shams al-Din; Minister of Ras al-Ein 1334
Muhammad Sharaf al-Din; Naqib al-Hair; Custodian of Husayn & Abbas shrines' 1393–1423
Yahya Dhiya al-Din
Ahmed III Abu Tiraas
Tumah I Kamal al-Din; Naqib al-Hair; Custodian of Husayn & Abbas shrines' 1423–1442
Sharaf al-Din; Naqib al-Hair; Custodian of Husayn & Abbas shrines' 1442–1493
Yahya; Naqib al-Hair; Custodian of Husayn & Abbas shrines' 1493–1536	Tumah II	Msaid
Dhiya al-Din; Grandfather of House Dhiya al-Din	Alam al-Din; Minister of Charitable Endowments of Karbala; 1573–1597	Jafar	Muhammad
Tumah III; Grandfather of House Tuma	Hassan	Jameel	Musa	Msaid
Kadhim	Yunis (Owner of Maal Yunis)	Isa	Musa
Ali	Ali	Hassan	Salman
Muhammad-Amin; Grandfather of House Sayyid Amin	Husayn	Abu al-Hasan	Mohammed-Daud
Nasrallah; Grandfather of House Nasrallah	Ali al-Tajir; Grandfather of House Tajir	Muhsin Ouj; Grandfather of House Ouj
