= Haramayn =

Haramayn (from Arabic: الحرمين, dual form of haram, meaning "The Two Sanctuaries"), is the traditional Islamic appellation of the two holiest cities of Islam, Mecca and Medina. It may also refer to:

- Jerusalem and Hebron during the Mamluk and Ottoman eras, echoing their status as holy sites for Palestinian Muslims
- Al-Juwayni (1028–1085), Sunni Shafi'i hadith and Kalam scholar
- al-Haramain Foundation (or al-Haramayn Foundation), a charity foundation based in Saudi Arabia, alleged by the U.S. Department of the Treasury to have "direct links" with Osama bin Laden
- Haramain High Speed Railway, Saudi Arabia's high-speed rail system linking Mecca and Medina.
- Bayn al-Haramayn, the area between Imam Husayn shrine and al-Abbas Shrine in Karbala

== See also ==
- Custodian of the Two Holy Mosques
