= Mohammed Hussain Nasrallah =

Iraqi judge

Sayyid Mohammed Hussain Nasrallah
- السيد محمد حسين نصر الله

Member of the Judicial Supervisory Authority
- In office 2011 – May 27, 2014

President of the Court of Appeal of al-Muthanna
- In office October 18, 2007 – 2011
- Preceded by: Rashid al-Khayoun
- Succeeded by: Dhiya al-Zanbur

President of the Court of Appeal of Karbala
- In office June 8, 2005 – October 18, 2007
- Preceded by: position established
- Succeeded by: Rashid al-Khayoun

President of the Court of Appeal of Wasit
- In office March 22, 2004 – June 8, 2005
- Preceded by: Jowhar Mahood
- Succeeded by: Faeq Dhamad

Vice President of the Court of Appeal of Babil
- In office October 20, 2003 – March 22, 2004
- Preceded by: Sami al-Mamuri
- Succeeded by: Sami al-Mamuri

41st Custodian of the Imam Husayn Shrine
- In office April 5, 2003 – August 24, 2003
- Preceded by: Abdul Sahib Nasrallah
- Succeeded by: Custodianship abolished Abdul Mahdi al-Karbalaei, Secretary General

Personal details
- Born: Muhammad-Husayn Muhammad-Ali Abid Nasrallah; May 17, 1951 (age 75) Karbala, Iraq
- Children: 4
- Relatives: Aref Nasrallah (first cousin); Hashem Nasrallah (first cousin, once removed)
- Education: University of Baghdad (LLB); Iraqi Judicial Institute (J)

Military service
- Allegiance: Iraq
- Branch/service: Iraqi Ground Forces
- Years of service: October 1, 1972, to December 12, 1973 (431 days)
- Unit: Iraq Army Reserve

Sayyid Muhammad-Husayn Muhammad-Ali Nasrallah (Arabic: محمد حسين محمد علي آل نصر الله; born May 17, 1951) is an Iraqi judge, former prosecutor who served as President of the Court of Appeal in four Iraqi provinces.

Following the fall of Saddam Hussein's government in April 2003, he was elected Governor of Karbala but declined the position to continue his judicial career. He subsequently served as a custodian of the Imam Husayn Shrine during the transition of its administration to the Shi'i Endowment Office and remained a member of its management board until January 2014.

Nasrallah retired from the judiciary in May 2014 and subsequently became a legal representative for Pillsbury Global in Iraq. He is also the head of the Nasrallah family, a prominent family of Karbala.

== Early life and education ==
Nasrallah was born on May 17, 1951, to Muhammad-Ali Nasrallah and Monira Tumah. Both of his parents hail from the noble Al Faiz family, and claim agnatic descent from Muhammad's daughter Fatimah and her husband, Ali, the first Shia Imam. Nasrallah was born in Karbala, and grew up there. He is the eldest of six children. His ancestors on some occasions ruled the city, and held custodianship of its holy sites. His brother, Haidar was executed by the Baathist regime in 1989.

=== Education ===
He moved to Baghdad in the late 1960s, and graduated with a bachelor's degree in law and politics in 1972 from the University of Baghdad. He was conscripted into the military after he graduated from university, and appointed as a legal soldier, serving for just under two years. Nasrallah then worked as a judicial investigator in 1973, until he joined the Judicial Institute of Iraq in 1977 to become a judge. He graduated as a judge from the institute in 1979. He also graduated in supreme specialised studies from the same institute in 2000.

Nasrallah was awarded with a certificate from the United Nations during a Convention on the Prevention and Punishment of the Crime of Genocide course in 2003.

Under a grant from the British Department for International Development, Nasrallah travelled, along with 139 other Iraqi judges, to Prague, to attend the Judging in a Democratic State course at the CEELI Institute. He attained a diploma from the institute in 2004. He also holds a diploma in Law Enforcement attained in Verbania, in 2005.

== Career ==
On June 19, 1979, the republican decree was issued appointing judges for that year, and Nasrallah was among those assigned, yet he was reluctant to assume his role. This was due to the civil laws in Baathist Iraq that clashed with Islamic laws and values. Hence, he ended up seeking Muhammad-Baqir al-Sadr in Najaf, and managed to get a religious decree allowing him to do so, with guidance on how to work the role, without violating his religious values.

Nasrallah participated in the 1991 uprising by supporting the rebels, and was eventually suspected by the Baathists and so was sent away from his hometown to work in cities in the north and south of Iraq.

=== Governorship and Custodianship ===
Following the 2003 invasion of Iraq and the fall of Saddam Hussein's government, local dignitaries in Karbala established a 30-member governing committee to oversee the province's administration during the transitional period. Comprising tribal leaders, senior clerics and other prominent figures, the committee was formed following four days of consultations. At its inaugural meeting on 15 April 2003, the committee elected Nasrallah, a serving judge, as Governor of Karbala, succeeding Lieutenant-General Talei al-Douri, the Ba'athist-era governor who had disappeared from public view following the capture of the city by American forces on 6 April. Despite his election, Nasrallah declined to assume the governorship, preferring to continue his judicial career. Nasrallah was then assigned as a custodian of the Imam Husayn shrine, until a secretary general was appointed by Ayatollah Sistani, as part of the constitutional transition of the shrines' management from the sidana to the Shi'i Endowment Office. However, Nasrallah remained on the shrine's management board until January 14, 2014.

=== Court of Appeal ===
The Court of Appeal is the highest judicial and administrative body in Iraq. The head of the court is considered to be the head of justice in the province and a member of the Supreme Judicial Council. On October 20, 2003, Nasrallah was assigned as vice president of the Court of Appeal of Babil. A year later he became the president of the Court of Appeal of Wasit, and a member of the Supreme Judicial Council. In 2005, he established the Court of Appeal in Karbala and was assigned as its president. Two years later, he became the president of the Court of Appeal of al-Muthanna, until 2011.

=== Judicial Supervisory Authority ===
In 2011, he became a member of the Judicial Supervisory Authority of the Supreme Judicial Council. Nasrallah was responsible for monitoring the conduct of the judges and the staff in the courts of Babil, Wasit, Najaf and al-Qadissiyah. He remained a member of the commission, until he retired on May 27, 2014.

=== Technocratic Nomination ===
In 2016, Muqtada al-Sadr attempted to form a technocratic government along with Haider al-Abadi. For this campaign, Nasrallah was nominated as Minister of Justice, considering his political independence, and honourable reputation. However, due to the political chaos in Iraq, the plans for the government were not followed through.

== Works ==
Nasrallah has produced three law studies:

- The Obligatory Will: In Law and Jurispuridence (1987)
- Laws of Absence (1993)
- Protesting and Appealing Laws in Absentia (1999)

The result of the first two studies caused amendments in the Iraqi Law of Personal Status.

== Personal life ==
Nasrallah is married and has four children. His son Ali, teaches Computer Science at the University of Karbala.

== See also ==
- Judiciary of Iraq
- Medhat al-Mahmoud
- Al Faiz family
