= Aref Nasrallah =

Iraqi activist

Sayyid Aref Nasrallah
- السيد عارف نصر الله
- Born: Aref Muhammad Abid Nasrallah; 1958 (age 67–68); Karbala, Kingdom of Iraq
- Occupations: Commissioner of Ibn Fahd shrine and seminary; Director at Public Relations Office of Ayatollah Shirazi - Iraq
- Relatives: Mohammed Hussain Nasrallah (first cousin); Hashem Nasrallah (first cousin, once removed)

Sayyid Aref Muhammad Nasrallah (Arabic: عارف محمد آل نصرالله; born 1958) is an Iraqi Shia social activist, philanthropist, and official commissioner of the Ibn Fahad shrine and seminary.

He was one of the preeminent leaders of the Islamic Action Organisation. He is currently also the director of grand Ayatollah, Sadiq al-Shirazi's public relations office in Iraq and has been holding this position since the 2003 Invasion of Iraq.

Nasrallah is the founder of the al-Wala' wa al-Fida' wa al-Fateh Association, an organisation that helps revive religious Shia sites that are affected by war or terrorism, as well as hold functions to commemorate the memory of the Ahl al-Bayt.

== Early life ==
Nasrallah was born in Karbala, to Muhammad Nasrallah, a merchant and servant at the al-Abbas shrine. Both of his parents hail from the noble Al Faiz family, and claim agnatic descent from Muhammad's daughter Fatimah and her husband, Ali, the first Shia Imam. His ancestors on some occasions ruled the city, and held custodianship of its holy sites. Nasrallah grew up in Karbala, and spent his childhood serving with his father. Nasrallah's life took a turn when his father died in 1969, and he was taken under the care of his uncles. Nasrallah joined the risali movement, known as the Islamic Action Organisation (IOA) in 1973, after the injustices the Baathist regime was projecting towards the Shia of Iraq. By 1976, he was wanted by the regime, because he was both, not enrolled in the army, which was obligatory at that time, and had been reported to the authorities as a member of al-Modarresi's illegal movement. In 1979, he was sentenced to death in absentia, whilst he was still in Karbala.

== Combat History ==
Straight after his sentence, he fled to Kuwait, and remained there for just under a year. He then went to Iran, upon the start of the Iran-Iraq war, and carried on with the IAO, which was fully functional and operational in Iran. The IAO was also working with the Islamic Revolutionary Guard Corps (IRGC), and so the IRGC were impressed with Nasrallah's capabilities, and decided to train him and send him out for combat missions abroad. He carried out numerous missions in Kurdistan in 1981. He fought alongside the Peshmerga in the Kurdish mountains until 1987, and then became the manager of the IOA's office in Kurdistan and settled there for ten years.

In the nineties, the IOA began to disintegrate, and the leadership was divided into a number of factions. Because of this, Nasrallah began to gradually withdraw himself. He left Kurdistan for Iran, and settled in Qom. By November, 1996, two sons of Muhammad al-Shirazi (Murtadha and Mahdi) were imprisoned in Iran due to ongoing disputes between the government and the Shirazis promotion of the shura al-fuqaha (leadership of a council of jurists) ideology. When they were released three years later, al-Shirazi turned to Nasrallah for help–who at that time had grown close to the Shirazis–to smuggle them out of Iran and go to Syria. After Nasrallah successfully transported both of al-Shirazi's sons, he returned to Iran. A little while after his arrival, he was imprisoned. A year later in prison, he was sentenced to death, but was then saved, following a decision by Mohammad Khatami to pardon a number of political prisoners, in an easing of the Islamic Republic's strict security policies. After he was released, he remained in Qom, near al-Shirazi–who was now pretty much alone, with most of his children and students abroad or in prison–for approximately six months, until al-Shirazi insisted that Nasrallah leave Iran, as it was not safe anymore.

Nasrallah fled to Kurdistan and then left for Damascus. He set foot in the Syrian capital in February 1999.

== Return to Iraq ==
In March 2003, just before Baghdad fell, Nasrallah returned to Iraq. Upon his return, he was assigned as the commissioner of the Ibn Fahd shrine and seminary in Karbala by the Shiite Endowment Office. He also assumed the position of director for the public relations office of Ayatollah Shirazi.

=== Samarra expedition ===
Three days after the 2006 bombing, Nasrallah organised a protest in Karbala condemning the bombing of the al-Askari shrine. Three thousand people joined in the protest, and from there they decided to go to Samarra. However upon reaching Latifiya, they were stopped by troops from both the US and Iraqi army. As much as Nasrallah insisted they let them through, they were denied. In the end, he was connected to Nouri al-Maliki's personal assistant, who made it clear to Nasrallah that it was impossible for the troops to allow them to proceed for a number of reasons. Despite Nasrallah's countless attempts at convincing al-Maliki's assistant that all they wanted to do was go and protect the shrine from any further potential danger, they were denied. These sentiments were shared by the vast majority of Iraqis, who wanted their country to remain whole and free of ethnic conflict.

After that, Samarra remained untouched, with very little development to return it to its old state. It was slowly fading away and considered a bygone by the majority of the Shias. This was because many of them were either scared of going, or simply avoiding to even think about it since they feared to go. However, Nasrallah was uncomfortable with this and felt he needed to revive the case. He organised another protest in Bayn al-Haramayn, this time demanding the reconstruction of the al-Askari shrine. The protest lasted for three days, however the response was relatively weak. So he consulted al-Shirazi - his spiritual leader – and was granted religious permission to go to Samarra, adding that this will be considered a "religious crusade" and their deaths will be considered martyrdom.

Nasrallah took heed of this, and announced that on eve of the martyrdom anniversary of Hasan al-Askari, i.e. March 16, 2008, they will be heading to Balad, as the closest point to Samarra, and hold a mourning procession there. At first, he struggled to find any coaches with drivers that we're willing to take them. So he reached out to some friends of his in Shatra, who were able to provide him with two coaches. He then contacted a friend of his in the special operations forces, Col. Sadiq al-Fatlawi, to help and escort them throughout the way, however al-Fatlawi strongly advised against the trip, and described it as a 'death-wish', and that they would be 'finished' at the first checkpoint. Nasrallah explained that they were only going to Balad (which was 45 kilometres away from Samarra), and not Samarra, but this still did not convince al-Fatlawi, and he remained in disagreement. Despite this, the next morning, Nasrallah called al-Fatlawi, and informed him that they were coming regardless, and this caused al-Fatlawi to eventually agree on escorting them to Balad.

Nasrallah reached Balad in the evening of March 16, and was welcomed greatly by its people and heads, who were overwhelmed, since they had not seen any visitors for more than two years, i.e. since the bombings of the shrine. Nasrallah and his convoy spent the night in Balad mourning the martyrdom anniversary of al-Askari in the Sayid Muhammad shrine. After the procession, Nasrallah decided to unveil his true intentions to his group, which was he was planning to make his way to Samarra. To his joy, everyone was more than willing to join him.

The following morning, the heads of Balad approached Nasrallah, and wanted to show their gratitude by asking him for any request. Nasrallah responded with a call for support for his trip to Samarra, as they were more familiar with the way and situation. The people were shocked, and refused, saying that they would not want to thank them by sending them to their deaths. However, Nasrallah had no interest in backing down, so he remained persistent. He sent a first batch in front to test the way and see if the route was safe until the first checkpoint. When that batch returned, it reported that it was turned away by the first checkpoint, where they met the governor of Saladin, Hamad al-Qaysi, who explained that it was too dangerous.

Nasrallah did not care for this and decided to set off, and before he left Balad, he made a call to one of the leaders of the city, and pleaded for their support, yet they declined. Ten minutes later, he made one last call, this time using a more shaming tone, and uttered "remember this very well, remember that the Imams called for your aid, and you refused them, remember how you betrayed and shamed your religion, and this will follow for your coming generations, and I will stand and call you out on the day of Judgement." It seemed that this speech of his had moved them, and so they decided to follow. They came with forty cars, civilian and military. They spent the way receiving random gunfire coming from undisclosed locations, until they safely reached the al-Askari shrine. It was overwhelming and an emotional scene for them all, as they saw the dome of one of their most adhered figures, demolished, along with all of the debris.

Nasrallah and the convoy performed a mourning procession there, and then later spoke to the military men, who uncovered that the al-Maliki had planned to contract a Turkish company to lift all the debris in three years, and a reconstruct the shrine in fifteen years. Nasrallah was very unhappy with the plans and progress, so he contacted the higher religious authority in Najaf, i.e. Ayatollah Sistani's office, demanding a better plan, so al-Sistani sent Muhammad-Ali al-Shahristani to liaise. Nasrallah made five demands to the government, that needed to be addressed if they wanted them to leave, they were:

1. Samarra is to be released from the political sphere and made a religious case only.
2. The contract between the Iraqi government and Turkish company be terminated, and new one be formed strictly with an Iraqi company.
3. UNESCO's involvement be limited to only observation, and no interference in the al-Askari shrine.
4. The significant increase of military presence placed in order to protect the shrines.
5. The way to Samarra be secured enough, so that pilgrims can comfortably make visitation at any time during the year.

Nasrallah wanted to do some work to deal with the debris, but he was not allowed, and the special operations forces commander said that letting them in itself was going to get them in a lot of trouble, and that they can not let them do anything else.

Nasrallah also introduced the idea of dedicating the last Friday of Ramadan as the national day to support al-Askariyayn (Hasan al-Askari and Ali al-Hadi).

Inspired by Mirza Shirazi and his revitalisation and re-centralisation of Samarra, Nasrallah has been working to return the city to its prior academic status and become a centre for teaching and training those seeking Islamic sciences and knowledge taught by the Ahl al-Bayt, especially since it took a halt after the death of Shirazi. He has been working on establishing religious and cultural centres. This includes Husayniyat al-Rasool al-Adam, which he personally funds and supervises.

== Activism ==
Nasrallah hosts an annual protest, in Arar, near the Iraqi-Saudi border, condemning the demolition of the al-Baqi' cemetery, and demanding the Saudi government to rebuild the graves of the prominent Islamic figures buried there.

He also called for the legislation of a vatican-like vicinity to be made for the city of Karbala, with its own holy laws that will prevent the violation of the sanctity of the city.

In Syria, after the civil war set off, he took the first mourning delegation to visit the Sayeda Zainab shrine, and helped many Afghans that lived in Damascus, relocate to Karbala.

== Philanthropy ==
Nasrallah sponsors a number of charitable initiatives in Iraq, some of them include:

- The Fatima al-Zahra Charitable Foundation in Iraq, which distributes financial aid to newly weds that are struggling financially in Karbala.
- The Grand Hussaini Project, which annually provides multiple services (such as accommodation, food and drink, etc.) for free to the public, during the Arbaeen pilgrimage.
- Al-Rahiq al-Makhtoom campaign that saw the distribution of food bags to underwhelmed families in face of the COVID-19 pandemic.

== Personal life ==
Nasrallah is married and has seven children. His son Muhammad-Mehdi was killed in an explosion on June 6, 2016, in Karbala. The attack was claimed by ISIS, and was initially targeting Nasrallah. An annual football tournament was set up in honour of Muhammad-Mehdi by the Youth and Sport Welfare Authority in the Imam Husayn Shrine. Karbala's city council also renamed the road in which the explosion took place in to al-Shahid Muhammad Aref Nasrallah (transl. The Martyr Muhammad Aref Nasrallah) Road.

Nasrallah is a close friend of Kuwaiti MP, Saleh Ashour.

== See also ==
- Imam al-Askari Shrine
- Sadiq al-Shirazi
- Al Faiz Family
