= Ahmad bin Ismail al-Jazyiri =

Iranian-Iraqi faqih and writer

- أحمد بن إسماعيل الجزائري
- Born: ? Al-Jazayir, Arabistan, Safavid Iran
- Died: 1736; Najaf, Baghdad Eyalet, Ottoman Empire
- Resting place: Imam Ali Shrine
- Occupations: Islamic jurist; writer; teacher
- Writing career
- Language: Arabic
- Genre: Religious literature

Ahmad bin Ismail al-Jazyiri al-Najafi (Arabic: أحمد بن إسماعيل الجزائري النجفي, romanized: Aḥmad ibn Ismāʻīl al-Jazāʼirī al-Najafī); died 1736) was an Iranian-Iraqi Ja'fari jurist and writer, best known for his 1726 work Qalāʼid al-durar fī bayān āyāt al-aḥkām bi-al-Athār (Arabic: قلائد الدرر في بيان آيات الأحكام بالأثار) which is written about Quran-Fiqh relation by focusing on juristic verses.

== Biography ==
Ahmed bin Ismail bin Abd al-Nabi bin Saad al-Jaza’iri al-Gharawi/ al-Najafi was born in an unknown year in Al-Jazayir, Arabistan, under Musha’sha’iyah Emirate of Safavid Iran. Belonged to the Al-Jazairi family, who descended from Banu Asad tribe, they came from Al-Jazayir, whose location was Lake Hammar to Al-Qurnah. This family was known in Najaf from the late 17th century, where migrated and settled.

In Najaf, he was a student of Muhammad Salih Khatun Abadi, Ahmad ibn Muhammad Yusuf al-Bahrani, Hussein ibn Abd Ali al-Khamaisi and Abu al-Hasan al-Fotoni. He received ijazah from some scholars of his time. Then worked as a teacher, a large group of 18th century scholars graduated from him, including: his son Muhammad, Nasrallah al-Haeri and Abdul Aziz bin Ahmed Al-Najafi. He mentioned his teachers of Islamic sciences in his ijazah for his son. He was interested in writing and left several important works in Ja'fari jurisprudence, more famous for his book on Quran-Fiqh relation Qalāʼid al-durar fī bayān āyāt al-aḥkām bi-al-Athār(Arabic: قلائد الدرر في بيان آيات الأحكام بالأثار) which completed in Rajab 1138/ March 1726. This book made him as one of the figures of the religious scientific revival movement in 18th century Najaf.

Al-Jazairi died in Najaf in 1151 AH/ 1738 and was buried in the Iwan of ulema of Imam Ali Shrine.

== Works ==
- Arabic: قلائد الدرر في بيان آيات الأحكام بالأثار, romanized: Qalāʼid al-durar fī bayān āyāt al-aḥkām bi-al-Athār,
- Arabic: رسالة في الارتداد
- Arabic: رسالة في آداب المناظرة
- Arabic: رسالة في ارتداد الزوجة
- Arabic: رسالة في الطهارات الثلاث وبعض مسائل الصلاة
- Arabic: رسالة في الطهارة
- Arabic: رسالة في كيفية إقامة المسافر في بلده
- Arabic: رسالة ميزان المقادير
- Arabic: تبصرة المبتدين
- Arabic: الشافية
- Arabic: شرح الإيساغوجي
- Arabic: شرح التهذيب
- Arabic: مناسك الحج والأدعية
