= Ibn Fahad al-Hilli =

14th/15th-century Iraqi Muslim scholar (1355–1438)

- ابن فهد الحلي

Personal life
- Born: 1355
- Died: 1438 (aged 82–83)
- Resting place: Ibin Fahad al-Hilli shrine, Karbala
- Region: Iraq, Qaraqoyunlu
- Notable work: 'Uddat al-Da'i Wa Najah al-Sa'i

Religious life
- Religion: Islam
- Denomination: Shia
- Jurisprudence: Ja'fari
- Creed: Twelver

Allamah Sheikh Ahmed bin Muhammad bin Fahad al-Hilli al-Asadi (Arabic: العلامة أحمد بن محمد بن فهد الحلي الأسدي; 1355–1438), famously known as Ibn Fahad al-Hilli (Arabic: ابن فهد الحلي), was an eminent Iraqi Shia jurist and religious authority.

He was known for his works on religious ethics, supplications and spirituality.

== Early life and education ==
The whereabouts of his birthplace are unknown. He lived for a while in Hillah, which was one of the first center of Shi'a scholars such as ibn Fahd. He studied at the Zaynabiyah school, and was taught by the students of Fakhr al-Muhaqiqeen and al-Shaheed al-Awwal.

Agha Bozorg al-Tehrani believes that he was among the students of al-Shaheed al-Awwal. Al-Hilli received his ijaza in 1421, from the son of al-Shaheed al-Awwal when he visited Jabal Amel, and Jezzine. After that, he moved to Karbala, and found its religious seminary. His move played an important role in establishing Karbala, as the religious Shia kernel at the time.

== Impact on the Qara Qoyunlu state ==
In 1436, Ispend bin Yusuf, the ruler of Baghdad, invited al-Hilli, so that he may debate his faith with Sunni scholars. In the debate, al-Hilli and his consortium of Shia scholars, debated with the Sunnis and were able to beat them, and convince Ispend to convert to Shi'ism. Through his move, Ispend declared Shi'a Islam as the official religion of his state and struck coins with the names of the twelve Imams.

== Works ==
He wrote books on different aspects of Islamic sciences such as mysticism, jurisprudence, tradition and other religious spheres. Some of them include:

- Al Awiyah va Al Fatum
- Istekhraj Al Havadeth (predicting some events, such as appearance of Safavid dynasty and Mongol's Attack by Ali ibn Abi Talib
- The Mysteries of Praying
- Tahsin fi Sefat al Arefin
- Iddat Al Daei

== Death and shrine ==
He died in Karbala, and was buried in his home. Over time, a shrine was erected over his tomb. The ground floor of his home became a mosque, and an inn for the pilgrims of Karbala. The upper levels became a religious seminary, known as the Ibin Fahad school. In 1939, a library was built in the shrine, and was named the Rasool al-Adham library. In the 1964, Sayyid Muhammad al-Shirazi and his brother, Sayyid Hassan al-Shirazi strived to renovate the seminary, and managed to do so by gathering donations from some of the notables of Karbala, and this was all done under the supervision of the supreme religious authority of the time, Sayyid Muhsin al-Hakim.

His shrine lies on the Qibla street, approximately 500 metres from the Imam Husayn shrine. After the US invasion of Iraq, the Shiite Endowment Office appointed Aref Nasrallah as the commissioner of the shrine and seminary.

== See also ==
- Ja'fari jurisprudence
- Principles of Islamic jurisprudence
