= Ali Al Tajer =

Iraqi painter and art historian

- Born: 1962 (age 63–64); Karbala, Iraq
- Education: University of Baghdad, BA, MA
- Occupations: Painter, Illustrator
- Writing career
- Period: 1987–present
- Notable work: Babylon (2015)
- Website: alialtajer.com

Sayyid Ali Muhammad-Ali Al Tajer (Arabic: علي محمد علي آل تاجر; born 1962) is an Iraqi painter and art historian. He studied drawing at the University of Baghdad's College of Fine Arts. He currently stands as a member of the Association of Iraqi Artists, as well as the Organization of Iraqi Fine Artists.

== Early life and education ==
Al Tajer was born in Karbala in 1962 to lawyer, Muhammad-Ali Al Tajer. He hails from the noble Al Faiz family, and claims agnatic descent from Muhammad's daughter Fatimah and her husband, Ali.

He moved to Baghdad to pursue his studies, and enrolled at the College of Fine Arts at the University of Baghdad, earning a bachelor's degree in 1987, then went on to earn a master's degree in drawing in 1992.

== Career ==
In the late seventies he went on to work as an illustrator for several magazines and newspapers in Iraq. Eventually he participated in a collective exhibition held for the international Annual Festival of the Child. In 1982 he produced his first animated film for the educational channel on Iraqi state television. Then throughout the eighties he was participating in different exhibitions across the country.

In 2000, Al Tajer participated in his first international exhibition, in Beirut, and went on to participate in other countries, such as Jordan, Bahrain, and Oman.

== Art ==
Al Tajer's art typically depicts daily urban life in Iraq, featuring customs and traditional aspects of Iraqi culture. Flowers, and particularly roses, are commonly used motifs. He has cited the painters James Ensor and Marc Chagall as sources of inspiration. In 2015, Al Tajer exhibited a painting series entitled Babylon, which combined moments of day-to-day life in Iraq with symbolic objects and people.

As a researcher, Al Tajer has explored Iraqi folk heritage, as well as the role of ancient myths, human and animal motifs in Iraqi folk art.
