= Hashem Nasrallah =

Iraqi businessman

Sayyid Hashem Nasrallah
- السيد هاشم نصر الله

Chairman of the Karbala Chamber of Commerce
- In office November 1, 1959 – October 29, 1969 (6 terms)
- Preceded by: Mehdi al-Hindi
- Succeeded by: Jawad Abu al-Hab

Personal details
- Born: Hashim Hassan Muhammad Nasrallah; February 7, 1923 Karbala, Mandatory Iraq
- Died: May 4, 1997 (aged 74) Karbala, Ba'athist Iraq
- Parent: Hassan Nasrallah (father)
- Relatives: Mohammed Hussain Nasrallah (first cousin, once removed); Aref Nasrallah (first cousin, once removed); Mohammed Hassan Dhiya al-Din (maternal uncle)

Sayyid Hashem Hassan Nasrallah (Arabic: هاشم حسن آل نصر الله; February 7, 1923 – May 4, 1997) was an Iraqi nobleman, businessman and the chairman of the Karbala Chamber of Commerce for six terms from 1959 to 1969.

== Early life ==
Nasrallah was born on February 7, 1923, in Karbala. His father was Hassan Nasrallah, the son of Muhammad (Hammoud) Nasrallah (d. October 27, 1901), the head of traders of Karbala in the Ottoman era and a very affluent man. His mother was the daughter of Murtadha Dhiya al-Din, the 19th saden (custodian) of the al-Abbas shrine. Nasrallah is the third of four children. Both his parents hails from the noble Al Faiz family, and claim agnatic descent from Muhammad's daughter Fatimah and her husband, Ali, the first Shia Imam. His ancestors on some occasions ruled Karbala, and held custodianship of its holy sites.

== Career ==
Nasrallah worked for his father Hassan's trading company, selling agricultural products and appliances, some imported from the US and Europe. In 1959, he and his brothers became chairmen of the company and began to further expand the business. They then established a large warehouse that distributed food and non-food goods, as well as the agricultural goods. At some point they were also importing cars from Europe, and had the warehouse act as a car showroom.

Due to Nasrallah's calibre among the traders in Karbala, he was nominated for chairman of the Karbala Chamber of Commerce by the traders, and in 1959, he took on management of the chamber. He served for six terms, from November 1959 to October 1969, being the longest serving chairman of the chamber. As chairman of the chamber, he would issue export and import licenses, as well as execute building contracts through his construction company, and invite members from the chambers of commerce from all over Iraq to Karbala, for meetings that would lead to many business ventures for the city.

The chamber began the al-Iqtisad magazine on July 15, 1960, under the supervision of Nasrallah. The chamber issued two magazines a month, and only had nine issues. Its final issue was released on December 15, 1960.

Nasrallah enjoyed Arab-Islamic history and culture greatly, and decided to establish a library for the chamber, in 1963. After attaining permission from the higher authority, he formed a committee made up of employees from the chamber, and had them purchase a plethora of books, ranging from history books to books about business, religion, and science. Members of the committee travelled to other cities such as Baghdad and Najaf to purchase books, until a notable amount of books was collected in the library. The library kept expanding over the years until the 1991 uprising, which saw the Baathist forces destroy Karbala, and this included the chamber, which they burnt down, and only a few books remained from the chambers library.

In 1965, Nasrallah endorsed a new date syrup factory in Karbala, in conjunction with the Industrial Bank, and the factory was established the following year.

On February 28, 1968, Nasrallah sent a telegram, on behalf of all of Iraq's chambers of commerce, to Mohamed Makiya, endorsing his plans to revolutionize the city of Kufa by building a state of the art university, and large market. However the plans were opposed by the Baathists, who Makiya fell from favour with, and the project never saw light.

== Personal life & death ==
Nasrallah was responsible for receiving the mourning processions representing the University of Baghdad on Ashura. Along with the sons of Ayatollah Hakim, he would receive over 2000 students and 1000 professors. The procession would arrive to Karbala on the ninth of Muharram, visit the two shrines, then return to their accommodation, which was spread across five Hussainiyah's, and spend the night there. Then they would wake up the following morning, on the tenth of Muharram, and attend a majlis at the al-Masloob Hussainiyah, that started with a recitation of Ziyarat Ashura, followed by a word by a Moroccan student, an elegy by an Algerian student, and finally, a closing speech by Nasrallah, where he thanks the university, and extends his hope that they are inspired by Husayn, whose ethics provide a socio-ethical blueprint that is exemplary in the way it articulates the values of Islam.

Nasrallah held an annual festival at his home, where he would invite high officials and dignitaries to commemorate the birth of Fatimah. He would either invite Sayyid Hashem al-Qari, Sayyidd Mustafa al-Faizi Al Tumah, or other orators to give a sermon, and then a discussion would follow between those present, about the merits of Fatima and her noble cause during her lifetime. This gathering was popular enough to be featured in the local press.

In August 1965, the office of Abd al-Salam Arif appointed Nasrallah as saden of the al-Abbas shrine, replacing his maternal cousin, Badr al-Din Dhiya al-Din. This decision came as a result of the governor of Karbala, Sultan Kirmashah reporting Dhiya al-Din to the president for being inept in his job. However, the real reason was that Kirmashah felt that Dhiya al-Din did not show him enough respect as someone in a more senior position. On the other hand, Nasrallah strongly rejected this ordeal, and believed his cousin was wrongfully dismissed, so he and other members of the Nasrallah and Dhiya al-Din families lobbied for the return of Dhiya al-Din, and by October 1965, Kirmashah was transferred away from Karbala, and Dhiya al-Din was reinstated as saden.

Nasrallah was married and had one son, Ali (b. 1952), who is a Senior Fellow in Financial Services at the Manchester Business School, where he lectures and researches into areas relating to banking, corporate financial management and information technology. He is also a key adviser to Generali.

=== Death ===
Nasrallah spent the end of his life taking care of his library, that contained an array of different books, until he died on May 4, 1997.

== See also ==
- Chamber of Commerce
- List of Iraqi businesspeople
- Al Faiz family
