= Murtadha Nasrallah =

Iraqi law professor

Sayyid Dr. Murtadha Nasrallah
- السيد مرتصى نصر الله
- Born: Murtadha Nasir Ali Nasrallah; 1922; Kadhimiya, Kingdom of Iraq
- Died: 2005 (aged 82–83); Kadhimiya, Iraq
- Resting place: Karbala, Iraq

Murtadha Nasir Nasrallah (Arabic: مرتضى ناصر آل نصر الله; 1922–2005) was an Iraqi doctor of law, he worked as a professor at the University of Baghdad's business school. He was a celebrated author, writing some of the leading books on corporation law.

== Early life and education ==
Nasrallah was born in Kadhimiya in 1922. Originally from Karbala, his father Nasir Nasrallah moved to Kadhimiya early in the 20th-century. His mother was the daughter of Sheikh Muhammad-Kadhim al-Shaybani. His father hails from the noble Al Faiz family that hold high status in Karbala, Nasrallahs grandfather, Sayyid Ali Nasrallah was the saden of the Imam Husayn shrine, whilst his great-grandfather, Sayyid Ahmed Nasrallah was the saden of the al-Abbas shrine. Nasrallah claims agnatic descent from Musa al-Kadhim, the seventh Shia Imam. His ancestors on some occasions ruled Karbala, and held custodianship of its holy sites.

He completed his primary education at the Amiriya school in Kadhimiya, and went on to study his secondary studies in the Markaziya school in Baghdad. From there on he was admitted into Law school in 1943, and completed his bachelors in Law in 1947. He travelled to Switzerland in 1947, and joined the Faculty of Law at the University of Geneva. In Switzerland, he graduated with a diploma in Law in 1948, a diploma in International Law in 1949, and then a doctorate of Law in 1952.

== Career ==
He returned to Iraq in 1952, upon completing his PhD from the University of Geneva, and joined the University of Baghdad's Law school as a teacher. In 1960 he became an assisting professor, and in 1969 a professor.

He then moved to Jordan, working as a Law professor at the University of Jordan between the years 1983 and 1997. After this he retired.

== Works ==
- Mabādiʾ al-Qānūn al-Duwalī al-Khāṣ al-Tijārī [Principles of Private International Commercial Law] (1962).
- Al-ʾAwrāq al-Mālīyah Alatī Taṣdurhā al-Sharikāt al-Musahama [Securities issued by joint stock companies] (1968). Research paper released in al-Balagh magazine, year #2. issues 4, 5, 6, and 7.
- Al-Sharikāt al-Tijārīyah [Trading Companies] (1969) – via New York University Libraries.

== Personal life ==
Nasrallah was married and had children. He was a close friend of Iraqi sociologist, Dr. Ali al-Wardi, and would often help him with his research.

== Death ==
Nasrallah died in 2005 in Kadhimiya, and was buried in Karbala in one of the family crypts in the old cemetery.

== See also ==
- Al Faiz Family
- Corporate Law
- Ali al-Wardi
