= Abdul Razzaq al-Wahaab =

Iraqi writer

Sayyid Abd al-Razzaq al-Wahaab
- عبد الرزاق الوهاب آل طعمه
- Born: Abd al-Razzaq Abd al-Wahaab Abd al-Razzaq Tumah; 1895; Karbala, Ottoman Empire
- Died: August 10, 1958 (aged 62–63); Baghdad, Kingdom of Iraq
- Resting place: Al-Abbas Shrine
- Writing career
- Notable work: Karbala in History (3 volumes)

Sayyid Abd al-Razzaq al-Wahaab Tumah (Arabic: عبد الرزاق الوهاب آل طعمه; 1895 – August 10, 1958), was an Iraqi nobleman, and writer.

He is known for his most notable work, Karbala Fi al-Tarikh (Karbala in History) which consisted of 3 volumes.

== Biography ==
al-Wahaab was born in 1885 to Abd al-Wahaab Tumah (d. 1928), the mayor of Karbala in 1926. He is from the Tumah branch of the Al Faiz family. His grandfather, and his brothers, took on the family name of al-Wahaab, after their father, Wahaab Tumah, the governor of Karbala; custodian of the Imam Husayn shrine (1823–1826); custodian of the al-Abbas shrine (1826–1829). His family name is not to be mistaken with the al-Wahaab family that branched from Al Zuhayk.

al-Wahaab was a distinguished in his writing, and witnessed most of the incidents of 1920 revolt, recording them in his books and publications. His works were featured many times in the press and magazines, namely in the al-Irfan, al-I'tidal, al-Sa'a, and Risalat al-Sharq.

He had a remarkable library in Karbala, with rare books and manuscripts. The library was destroyed during the 1991 uprising.

al-Wahaab died on Sunday, August 10, 1958, in Baghdad. His corpse was transferred to Karbala, and buried in the al-Abbas shrine.
