= Mohammed Hassan Dhiya al-Din =

Custodian of al-Abbas shrine

Sayyid Mohammed Hassan Dhiya al-Din
- السيد محمد حسن ضياء الدين

20th Custodian of the al-Abbas Shrine
- In office 1938 – January 2, 1953
- Preceded by: Murtadha Dhiya al-Din
- Succeeded by: Badr al-Din Dhiya al-Din

Personal details
- Born: Muhammad-Hasan Murtadha Mustafa Dhiya al-Din; 1889 Karbala, Ottoman Empire
- Died: January 2, 1953 (aged 63–64) Karbala, Kingdom of Iraq
- Resting place: al-Abbas Shrine
- Relatives: Hashem Nasrallah (nephew)

Sayyid Muhammad-Hassan Murtadha Dhiya al-Din (Arabic: محمد حسن مرتضى آل ضياء الدين; 1889 – January 2, 1953), also known as Agha Hassan al-Killidar, was an Iraqi nobleman that served as the 20th custodian of the al-Abbas shrine from 1938 until 1953.

== Early life ==
Dhiya al-Din was born in 1889 to Murtadha Dhiya al-Din. His father, grandfather, and great-grandfather all served as sadens of the Abbas shrine before him. He hails from the noble Al Faiz family, and his ancestor Dhiya al-Din al-Faizi was the naqib of Karbala in 1622.

== Custodianship ==
Dhiya al-Din became the saden of the Abbas shrine after the death of his father in May 1938.

In 1926, the Iraqi government assigned ten notable figures from each Iraqi city to sign a protocol deeming Mosul a part of Iraq and not Turkey, as part of the Mosul Question. Dhiya al-Din's father was one of the figures and signatories representing Karbala. However his father fell ill so Dhiya al-Din signed on his behalf as his eldest son.

In 1932, Dhiya al-Din's father established the first water supply in Karbala in their famous grove, Dhway, and after his death, Dhiya al-Din took control, and improved it greatly by providing new pumps, and sanitation systems.

On July 17, 1930, a large feud began between the mawakeb (mourning processions) of Kadhimiya and the mawakeb of Najaf broke out, leading to a larger feud between Najaf and Karbala, that saw the mawakeb of Najaf barred from entering Karbala during pilgrimage seasons. Compounding this running feud was that the Najafis expected Karbala to side with them at the time of their feud with the Kadhmawi mawakeb, since it was a part of Karbala at the time, yet Karbala did not join and chose a neutral stand point. This sad issue ran for more than a decade, until Dhiya al-Din took it on himself to end this feud, and invited both mawakeb to his famous al-Buqcha garden, for a large feast, and formed a peace treaty between them. From that day on, the mawakeb of Najaf returned to Karbala, and relations were restored.

In 1948, a delegation from Mosul visited Karbala, after visiting Najaf to console the renowned poet, Muhammad-Mehdi al-Jawaheri on the death of his brother, who was killed during the al-Wathbah uprising. The delegation was hosted in Dhiya al-Din's famous garden.

In February of 1952, the oil agreement instigated opposition parties to spark protests across the country, and so a march set out in Karbala, and the situation quickly escalated. Clashes between the people and the army turned violent, and so the army, on the orders of the governor of Karbala, Makki al-Jamil, climbed the walls of the shrines to establish control over the city. This did not go down well with Dhiya al-Din, so he ordered the police and army to immediately come down from the walls, as that will only make the situation worse. Tensions grew between Dhiya al-Din and al-Jamil, however al-Jamil ordered the forces down from the walls. The forces remained on he streets, and soon after, the protests were extinguished. This encounter caused a fringe in the relationship between Dhiya al-Din and al-Jamil, which led Dhiya al-Din to personally call the prime minister, Nuri al-Said telling him that either one of them will have to leave Karbala, to which al-Said replied: "You will remain, and Mekki al-Jamil will leave Karbala today!" al-Jamil was transferred on Tuesday August 18, 1952.

== Personal life ==
Dhiya al-Din married the daughter of an affluent scholar and mystic, known as Sayyid Ali al-Qutb.

He had five sons, and it was his son, Badr al-Din (Badri) who succeeded him as saden of the Abbas shrine.

== Death ==
Dhiya al-Din fell ill in the first quarter of 1952, and died on January 2, 1953. He was buried in the Dhiya al-Din crypt in the Abbas shrine.

== See also ==
- Al-Abbas Shrine
- Anglo-Iraqi treaty
- Al Faiz family
