= Moscow University for the Humanities =

Coordinates: 55.7299°N 37.814°E

Moscow University for the Humanities (Russian: Московский гуманитарный университет - МосГУ) is an accredited privately operated institution for higher education located in Moscow, Russia. It is a member of the International Association of Universities.

The university has six faculties. It serves more than 5,000 students at a time.

The institution traces its history back to the Central Komsomol School, created by the Soviet Union in 1944. It became the Higher Komsomol School in 1969. In 1990, it became the "Institute of Youth", and in September 1991, shortly before the end of the Soviet Union, it became an independent private school. In 2000, it was given the status of "academy" and renamed the Moscow Humanitarian and Social Academy. Finally, in 2003, it became a university.

Since 1994, the head of the university has been Igor Ilinskiy, who published a history of the university in 2005.
