= Nasrallah al-Haeri =

Iraqi polymath

Ayatollah Sayyid Nasrallah al-Haeri
- السيد نصرالله الفائزي الحائري
- Title: Ayatollah al-Sha'ir

Personal life
- Born: Nasrallah bin Hussain al-Fa'izi; 1696 Karbala, Ottoman Iraq
- Died: 1746 (aged 49–50) Constantinople, Ottoman Empire
- Cause of death: Assassination (Poison)
- Resting place: Istanbul
- Education: Mujtahid
- Other names: Mudarris at-Taff, Arabic: مدرّس الطف. al-Mudarris al-Shaheed, Arabic: المدرّس الشهيد al-Safi Arabic: الصفيّ al-Sharif al-'Awhad Arabic: الشريف الأوحد

Religious life
- Religion: Islam
- Denomination: Shia
- Institute: Najaf Seminary; Imam Husayn Shrine Seminary
- Lineage: Al Faiz
- Creed: Twelver

Ayatollah al-Shaheed Sayyid Abū al-Fatḥ ʿIzz ad-Dīn Naṣrallāh ِal-Fāʾizī al-Mūsawī al-Ḥāʾirī (Arabic: أبو الفتح عز الدين نصر الله الفائزي الموسوي الحائري; 1696 – 1746), also known as Sayyid Nasrallah al-Haeri, was a senior Iraqi Shia jurist, teacher, poet, author and annalist.

Nasrallah was a highly revered poet and influential cleric, described as being from the greatest among the scholars of his age, and was frequently labelled as a broad-minded and tolerant personality; "accepted by the opposition and the supporters". Famous Iraqi statesman Muhammad Ridha al-Shabibi described Nasrallah as "one of the literary leaders of the 18th century". He played an important role in inner-Islamic ecumenical dialogue during the Ottoman era.

== Lineage ==
Nasrallah belonged to the noble Faiz family, who have lived in Karbala since 861 and claim agnatic descent from Muhammad's daughter Fatimah, as follows:

Nasrallāh bin Ḥusayn bin ʿAli bin Yunis bin Jameel bin ʿAlam al-Dīn bin Ṭuʿma II bin Sharaf al-Dīn bin Ṭuʿma I bin Aḥmed Abu Ṭirās bin Yaḥya Dhiyaʾ al-Dīn bin Muḥammad Sharaf al-Dīn bin Aḥmed Shams al-Dīn bin Muḥammad Abu al-Faʾiz bin Abu al-Ḥassan ʿAli bin Aḥmed Jalal al-Dīn bin Muḥammad bin Abu Jaʿfar Muḥammad bin Abu Jaʿfar Najm al-Dīn al-Aswad bin Abu Jaʿfar Muḥammad bin ʿAli al-Gharīq bin Muḥammad al-Khair bin ʿAli al-Majthoor bin Aḥmed Abu al-Ṭayyib bin Muḥammad al-Ḥaʾiri bin Ibrahīm al-Mujāb bin Muḥammad al-ʿAābid bin Musa al-Kāthim bin Jaʿfar as-Sādiq bin Muḥammad al-Bāqir bin ʿ Ali al-Sajjad bin Ḥusayn al-Shahid bin ʿ Ali Ibna Abi Talib.

== Biography ==
=== Early life ===
Nasrallah was born in Karbala, Ottoman Iraq, in 1696. His father was Sayyid Hussain al-Faizi, and his mother was the daughter of his father's first cousin, Sayyid Mansoor al-Faizi. He comes from a long lineage of leaders of Karbala and custodians of the Husayn and Abbas shrines'.

He moved to Najaf to study religion under some of the most prominent scholars of his time, and attained the level of ijtiihad in 1713, at the young age of 16, being awarded permits by Sayyid Noor al-Din b. Ni'matullah al-Jazaeri, Shaykh Muhammad Baqir al-Neysaburi, al-Mawla al-Baghmaji, Sayyid Muhammad b. Ali al-Ameli al-Makki, Abu al-Hasan al-Ameli al-Futuni, Shaykh Ali b. Ja'far al-Bahrani, al-Amir al-Khatun al-Abadi, al-Mawla Muhammad Salih al-Harawi, al-Shaykh Mirza Ibrahim al-Isfahani al-Khuzani and others.

Nasrallah then returned to Karbala to teach in the Imam Husayn shrine. He taught many religious scholars, such as Sayyid Abdullah b. Noor al-Din al-Jazaeri, Sayyid Muhammad b. Amir al-Haaj, Shaikh Ali b. Ahmed al-Ameli, Shaykh Ahmed b. Hasan al-Nahawi and Sayyid Husayn b. Mir Rashid al-Radhawi al-Najafi (later compiled Nasrallah's poetry).

He would frequently perform i'tikaf in the Abbas shrine, spending his seclusion in prostration and studying the teachings of Muhammad's progeny.

In 1718 he went to the Hajj with his father Husayn and wrote about his pilgrimage in his book al-Rihla al-Makkiya.

In 1730 he travelled to Qom and stayed there for a while. Whilst in Qom, he attracted the attention of many of the residing scholars and mystics, and began teaching Al-Istibsar. He returned to Iraq in 1740.

=== Works ===
Nasrallah authored books, prose and poetry. These included:

- Adaab Tilawat al-Quran (The Etiquettes of Reading the Holy Quran)
- Diwan Nasrallah al-Haeri (Poetry Collection)
- al-Rihla al-Makkiya (The Meccan Journey)
- Tahreem al-Titin (The Forbidding of Smoking)
- al-Rawdhat al-Zahira Fi al-Mu'jizat Ba'd al-Wafat (The Blossomed Gardens of Miracles after Death)
- Salasil al-Thahab al-Marboota Biqanadeel al-Isma al-Shamikha al-Rutab (Golden Chains Attached to the Lanterns of Infallibility)
- al-Nafha al-Qudsiya Fi Madh Kheyr al-Bariya (A Divine Scent in the Praise of the Best of Men)
- Nafhat al-Nashwa Min Rawdhat al-Qahwa (The Scent of Ecstasy from the Gardens of Coffee)

=== Library ===
Nasrallah had a special library in the Husayn shrine, that contained thousands of books. He had purchased a thousand books upon his travels to Isfahan alone, which would be regarded as remarkable, with no printers at the time, this entailed difficulties in production and copying, making books a valuable commodity. Travel was also difficult, so bringing that many books from Isfahan to Karbala was very strenuous.

Sayyid Abdullah, the grandson of Sayyid Ni'matullah al-Jaza'iri narrates in his book, al-Ijaza al-Kabira: "I saw many interesting books in Sayyid Nasrallah's library, ones I had never seen in my life. This included the entire volumes of Bihar ul-Anwar. These gems were then passed onto Sayyid Nasrallah's heirs."

== Literary ==
=== Poetry ===
Nasrallah was distinguished in his poetry, writing about all different things, including eulogies and praises for Muhammad's progeny, condolences, thanksgivings, friendships, ghazal, nature, alliterations, chiding, gifts, apologies, satire, asceticism and authoritative criticism. It is said that his style was inspired by famous Iraqi poet Safi al-Din al-Hilli.

Nasrallah's poetry was compiled by his student, al-Radhawi, in a Diwan, and first published in 1954 by Shaykh Abbas Kirmani, at the expense of Sayyid Hassan Nasrallah, with a foreword by the prominent Shia intellectual and marja' of Najaf, Shaykh Muhammad-Husayn Kashif al-Ghita.

His poetry would often be engraved on different areas inside the shrine of Imam Hussain.

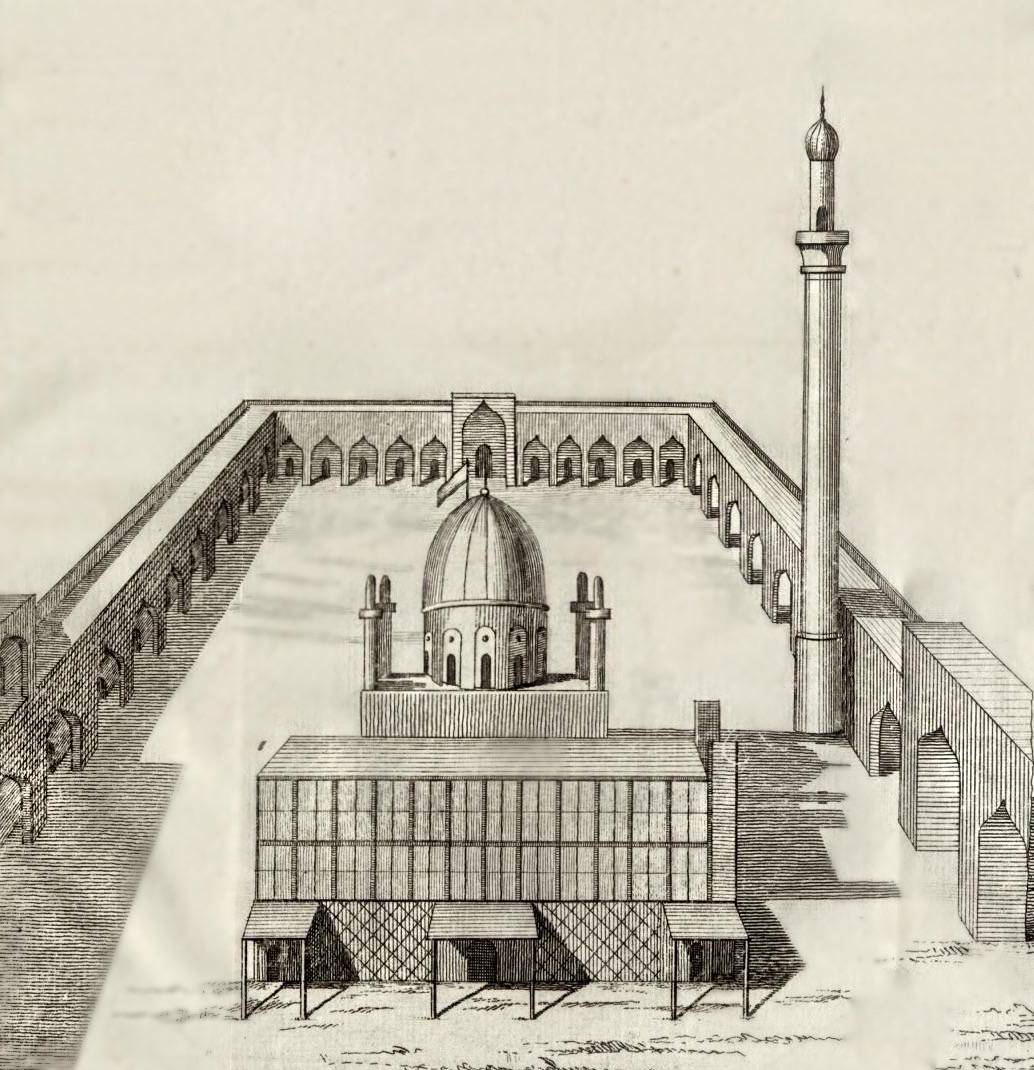
Illustration of Imam Husayn Shrine in 1765

In 1742, a grand fanous was placed inside the holy shrine with Nasrallah's two bayts engraved on it:

ألا إنّما فانوسُ شَمْعِك سَيّدي
أَرانا مِنَ الأَحْزَانِ في القَلبِ نيرانا
وما طاف حول الشمع إلا ليفتدي
لِشَمْعِكَ يا خيرَ البرية قُربانا

Translation:

The light of this lantern of yours O' master,
uncovers the grief that burns in our hearts.
The heart only circulates around this lantern,
to declare a ransom for your light, O' best of men.

On the south central door leading to the shrine, he has two beits engraved:

زائِري سِبْط أَحْمَد
مَنْبَع الرُشْدِ والهُدى
أسْبِلوا دَمْعَكُم دَمَاً
وَادْخُلُوا الْبَابَ سُجَّدا

Translation:

O' pilgrims of the grandson of Ahmed;
The source of truth and guidance.
Let your tears stream as blood,
and enter the gate bowing humbly.

On the south western door leading to Habib Ibna Mathahir's shrine, he has two beits engraved:

أَيُّها الزّوارُ نُلْتُمْ
ههُنا أَقصَى المَرامْ
هَذِهِ جَنَّاتُ عَدْنٍ
فادْخُلُوهَا بِسَلَامْ

Translation:

O' pilgrims you have earned,
over here, the best of wishes.
These are plots of Eden,
so enter them in peace.

On the south eastern door leading to the shrine, he has two beits engraved:

هَذِهِ بَاب لِجَنَّات النَعِيمْ
سَقْفُهَا رِضْوَان رَبِّ الْعَالَمِينْ
حَيْثُ قَدْ شَرَّفَهَا الله بِمَن
جَدِّهِ مَخْدُوم جِبْرَائيلَ الْأَمِينْ

Translation:

These are the gates to paradise,
Its roof is the throne of the lord of the worlds.
For Allah has honoured it with,
The grandson of whose servant was Gabriel.

In one of his most notable poems about the yearning for the city of Karbala, he states:

أَقدامُ مَنْ زارَ مَغناكِ الشَّريفَ غَدَتْ
تُفاخِرُ الرَّأسَ مِنْهُ ، طابَ مَثواك‌ِ

Translation:

The feet of that who visits your holy site,
Pride themselves over the head, blessed is your land.

Nasrallah describes how the feet pride themselves over the head – in contrary to the norm of the head being held in higher regard than the feet - because they are first to physically touch the ground of Karbala when you enter the city.

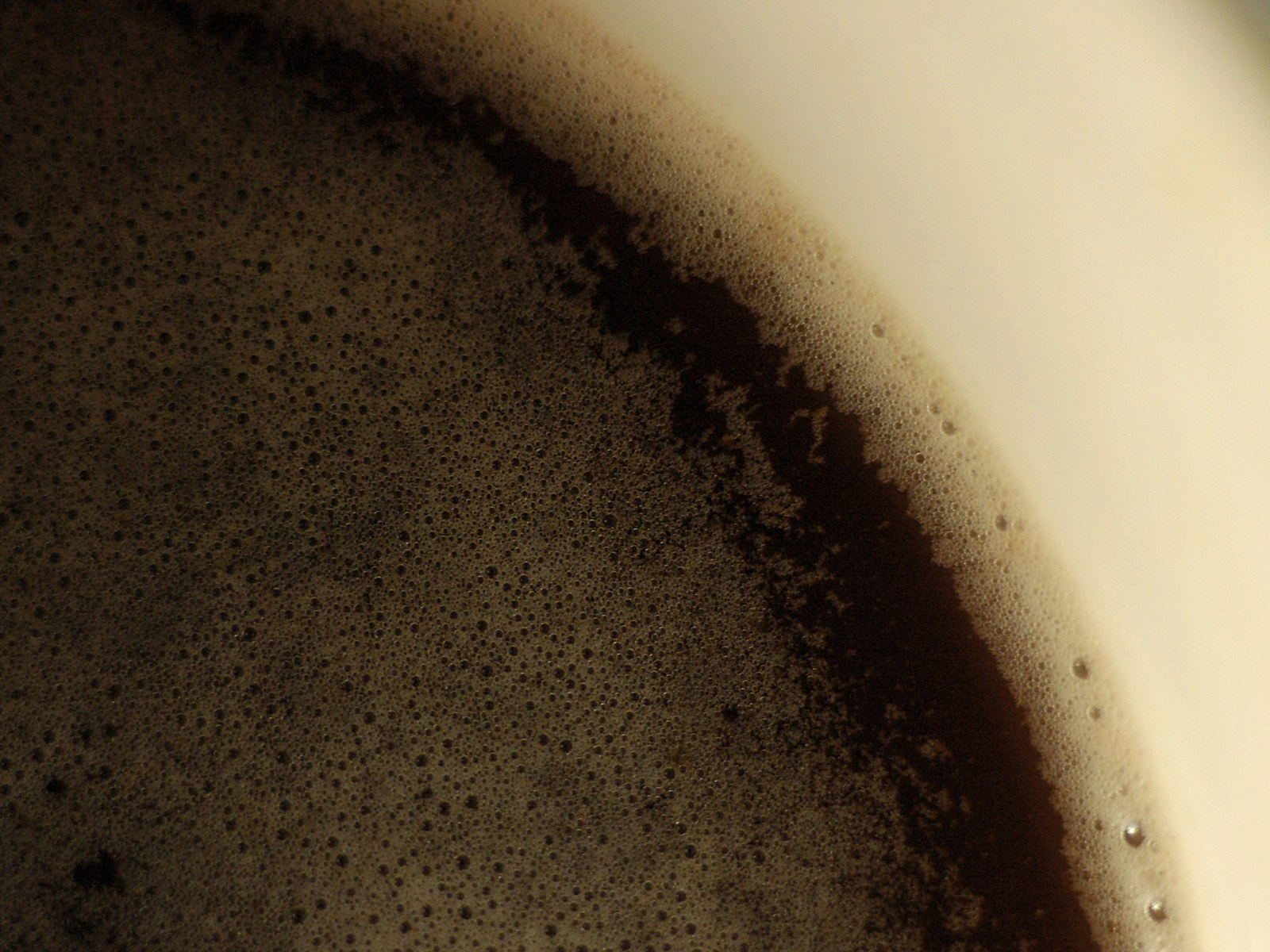
Black coffee in a white cup.

When the Damascene scholar, Shaykh Mustafa al-Siddiqi al-Dimashqi, visited Karbala in 1726, he met with Nasrallah, to which Nasrallah gifted him some of his works, including a writing about coffee, and the difference between black coffee and white coffee. This interestingly shows that three centuries ago, coffee was consumed in two different ways in Iraq, either as black coffee, which is roasted at higher temperatures for a longer time, or as white coffee, which is roasted for a short time at low temperatures, and hence you will get a lighter brew compared to black coffee. Some of what he states about coffee, in his poetry:

وَافُوا بِفِنْجَانٍ نَقِيٍ أَبْيَض
كَالبَدْرِ فِيهِ مِنْ الجَمَالِ صُنُوف
فَأسْوَدٌ لَما صُبَّت السَوْدَا بِهِ
فَكَأنٌّهُ بَدْرٍ عَلَاهُ كُسُوف

Translation:

Bring a cup that's purely white,
Like the moon, beautiful in different ways.
When you pour that blackness into it,
It's like a moon that has been eclipsed.

=== Maqamat ===
In Arabic prose literature, Nasrallah composed al-maqāma az-zar'iyya (the agricultural assembly).

The maqama is a eulogy of agriculture and its products, especially bread, which is of rare occurrence in Arabic literature. Arabic literature, in general, was fully urban – when not haunted by Bedouin nostalgia – and the farmers and their life in the countryside were almost totally neglected during the millennium of Classical Arabic literature. The maqama contains elements of social criticism, that aims to draw attention to the neglected agricultural system in eighteenth-century Iraq; however, it comes in the form of a playful petition to a patron, and the rural point of view is there to make the listeners or readers laugh, as well as relatively awaken them to the social melancholy in the countryside.

Nasrallah's maqama widens the perspectives of maqama by its rural setting. Plants had their say in many earlier maqamas but always remained within the refined urban culture. The plants of e.g. al-Suyuti are the cultivated flowers of a superb garden, not the simple agriculture plants and their products. Instead of luxurious aromatic plants, Nasrallah brings the ordinary edible plants into the foreground, making it a more down to earth description of agriculture.

=== Annals ===
Nasrallah would regularly record the date of events in his poetry, in the form of the abjad arrangement of the Arabic language.

Some of his annals included:

- Upon the positioning of Husayn Agha as garrison of Karbala in 1709, Nasrallah wrote:

بِمِصْرِنا وُلِيّ العُتُلُّ
ذَاكَ الذِي بِالشِقَا تَمَسَّكْ
وسَاءنَا حُكْمَهُ فَأرِخْ
(فِرْعَوْن الطَّفِ قَدْ تَمَّلَكْ)

Translation:

In our Egypt, the cruel rules,
the one who upholds misery.
His rule has brought dismay, so record:
(The Pharoah has possessed al-Taff)

The verse in brackets has a numerical value of 1120 (the hijri year for 1709).

- Upon the positioning of Ahmed al-Sayaf as garrison of Karbala in 1717, Nasrallah wrote:

أحْمَدْ السَيَّـاف مُذ ولـّي فِي
كَربلا أضْحَى بِهِ الظُلْمُ مُمَزّقْ
فَأتَـى تَـارِيخَـُه (رَبِـــــــحَ بِــــــــهِ
أحْمَدْ السَيَّاف جُنْدٌ الجَورِ فَرَّقْ)

Translation:

Since Ahmed al-Sayaf took charge,
darkness was abolished in Karbala.
So history recorded: (Triumphant is he who is with –
Ahmed al-Sayaf – breaker of the soldiers of tyranny)

The verse in brackets has a numerical value of 1129 (the hijri year for 1717).

- Upon the gilding of the dome of the Imam Ali Shrine by Nader Shah in 1742, Nasrallah wrote a long poem that starts with:

إِذَا ضَــامَـكَ الدَهْــرُ يَـوْمَـاً وَجَارَا
فَـلُـذْ بِـحِـمَـى أَمْـنَـعْ الـخَـلْـقِ جـَارَا

Translation:

If your world ever turns against you,
turn to the sanctuary of the protector.

And ends with:

هِــــيَ النَـــارُ، نَــارْ الـكَـلِـيم الَــتِي
عَــلَيْـهَـا الـــهُــدَى قَدْ تَبَدَّى جِـهَـارَا
تُــبـْـدِى سَـنَـاهَـا عِــيَـانَـاً فَــأَرّخـــــ
ـــتُ (آنِسْتُ مِنْ جَانِبْ الطُورِ نَارَا)

Translation:

She is the fire, of the one to whom Allah spoke,
upon which guidance became clearly visible.
It emits light to the gazing eye, so I record-
ed (I saw from the side of the Mount a fire)

The verse in brackets has a numerical value of 1155 (the hijri year for 1742).

- Upon the formation of a spring in al-Husayniya, Karbala by the Hasanid Sharifs of Mecca in 1718, Nasrallah wrote:

عَــيْـنُ الحَـــيَـــاةِ بَــــدَا عَــلَـى أَرْجَــائــهَــا
خِــضْـر الــنَــبَــاتْ يُـمِـيـسُ كَالمُـتَـبَخْتَرْ
لَمْ يَــبْــقِ فِي تَـــأرِيخِـــهَـــا (بَـــــرٌ) فَقُلْ
(بَحْرَ الـــنَـــدَى أَجْـــرَى مِـيَـاهْ الـكَــوْثَرْ))

Translation:

The spring of life came to its banks,
the green of the plants began prancing.
No (land) was left in its record, so say:
(This sea of generosity sprouted waters of Kowthar)

This verse is slightly different to other verses. Here there is a subtraction involved. The first bracket (land) has a value of 202, and the second bracket (This sea...) has a value of 1130, with a total numerical value of 1332. However, using a linguistic feature in the poem, the first bracket is subtracted from the second, rendering the value 1130 (the hijri year for 1718).

== Islamic ecumenism and Assassination ==
During the reign of the Ottoman Sultan, Mahmud I, there was no sign or intention to introduce the state recognition of Shi'ism. However, the Persian King Nader Shah was desperate for an ecumenical policy. It was difficult to maintain his political authority over his religiously mixed army when he was declared an infidel. So he needed to revoke this idea and declare Shi'ism the fifth Islamic school of thought after the four Sunni madhhabs. He labelled it the Ja'fari madhhab, a term derived from the name of Ja'far al-Sadiq who is considered by the Twelvers to be their Sixth Imam who presented "a legal treatise".

During Nader's presence in Iraq during the Ottoman-Persian war, he was advised that Nasrallah was one of the senior scholars of Iraq, and so he sought him to lead the intra-Muslim faith campaign. Nasrallah was a firm believer and advocate for peace between the two sects, and gladly pursued the cause throughout the country. However, he eventually began to understand that Nader Shah's efforts were purely for political gain and hardly for religious conviction, and so developed some reservations.

=== Najaf Conference of 1743 ===
In December 1743, Nader Shah pursued an initiative to bring the two sects together by convening a three-day conference (commencing on Wednesday 11 December), of both Sunni and Shiite scholars at Imam Ali's shrine in Najaf. This was a meeting that saw Sunnis and Shias coming together for the first time in history. There were seventy scholars from Iran, seven from Afghanistan and seven from Transoxania present. The governor of Baghdad, Ahmed Pasha, also sent the Hanafi qadi, Abdullah al-Suwaydi, to oversee and write the protocol of the conference, at the behest of Nader Shah.

The conference clearly portrayed Nader Shah's ulterior motive, since it stemmed from the need to appease the anti-Shi'i hostility reflected by the Sunni's, as only the legitimacy of Shi'ism was questioned, and not Sunnism. The discussions included the vilification of the first caliphs, the legitimacy of their rule, the question of Muhammad's companions in general, and temporary marriage (mut'a).

The Sunni's scholars were elated and saw this as a victory for them. However, the Shia scholars obviously did not, so they saw to the failure of the conference through an exceptional example of the 'art of mental reservation'. On the third and last day of the conference, Nasrallah was asked to hold the Friday prayer and sermon in the mosque of Kufa. Nader believed that if the names of the four caliphs would be read in the proper Sunni order by a Shi'i Imam, it would provide a public stamp of approval to the agreement.

So in his sermon, Nasrallah decided to use his exceptional literary skills when pronouncing the tardiya, i.e. Radi Allahu anhu (may Allah be pleased with him), after the names of Abu Bakr and Umar, as Sunni Muslims usually do upon mentioning the names of the sahaba. He had done what was expected, but he made a "mistake" and pronounced Umar's name with a triptote ending (Arabic: عمرِ), turning the meaning of the formula into "may Allah be pleased with anyone named 'Umar'". Playing, in addition, on the two inflectional terms 'adl (justice) and ma'rifa (knowledge), which are commonly known to grammarians, he made an extremely sublime pun that only a listener with advanced grammatical expertise, i.e. al-Suwaydi, would grasp. He thus surreptitiously fulminated against the second caliph twisting the usual meanings of 'adl and ma'rifa and unequivocally declared Umar void of these two virtues without explicitly uttering it. He also carried out the prayer in the Shi'i way.

This way, Nasrallah managed to vent the true feelings of the Shia's, and restore their dignity, without angering Nader, who was oblivious to the grammatical subtleties.

Despite what seemed like a positive conclusion to the meeting, the conference represented an early instructional example of the complicated relationship between politics and theology, especially as far as inner-Islamic rapprochement is concerned.

=== Assassination ===
The year following the Najaf conference, Nader Shah sent Nasrallah, as the Shia's representative to Mecca, with a letter to the Sharif of Mecca Mas'ood b. Sa'id to assert the recognition he planned to attain with the conference, and establish the 'fifth corner' in the Kaaba for the Ja'faris to pray in. The Sharif was hesitant, but duly accepted due to Nasrallah's eloquence and demeanor, where he allowed him to hold the prayer in the north west corner (corner of the Kaaba that faces Syria) and give a sermon. Upon his return, Nader Shah ordered him to go to Mahmud I in Constantinople (Istanbul) to receive the firman confirming this establishment.

Nasrallah was largely welcomed by the Sultan, and spent some time in Constantinople. However, not too long into his stay, the Sultan's religious advisers were not happy with the developments of the acknowledgment, so they spread rumours that Nader Shah was killed to cause havoc and try delay matters. Consequently, Nasrallah began to feel that he was in danger. Later, a plot was devised to assassinate Nasrallah to completely sabotage the deal, and at the Sultan's guards discretion, Nasrallah was poisoned. Upon the Sultan's discovery of the assassination, he tracked down the culprits and executed them. He also held a respectful funeral for Nasrallah, and is said to have buried him near Büyük Valide Han in Istanbul. There are other reports that claim that Mahmud I was behind the assassination, and had no interest in providing the Shi'is the recognition they longed for from the Ottoman Empire.

After the assassination of Nasrallah, no efforts were made to pursue the ecumenical policy, and it entirely collapsed after the assassination of Nader Shah in 1747.

== See also ==
- Ahmad bin Ismail al-Jazyiri

== See also ==
- Al Faiz Family
- Imam Husayn Shrine
