= Mohammed Hussain al-Shahrestani =

Iranian-Iraqi Shia marja' and poet

Grand Ayatollah Sayyid Muhammad-Husayn al-Shahrestani
- السيد محمد حسين الشهرستاني
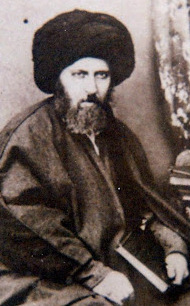

Personal life
- Born: 1840 Kermanshah, Iran
- Died: February 25, 1898 (aged 57–58) Karbala, Ottoman Empire
- Resting place: Imam Husayn Shrine
- Children: Muhammad-Ali; Muhammad-Jafar; Zayn al-Abideen; Murtadha; Muhammad; Abu Talib; Ahmed
- Parent: Muhammad-Ali al-Marashi (father)
- Relatives: Wahid Behbahani (grandfather)

Religious life
- Religion: Islam
- Jurisprudence: Twelver Shia Islam

Grand Ayatollah Sayyid Muhammad-Husayn al-Husayni al-Marashi al-Shahrestani al-Haeri (Arabic: محمد حسين الحسيني المرعشي الشهرستاني الحائري; Persian: محمد حسين حسينى مرعشى شهرستانى حائرى; 1840 – February 25, 1898), known as al-Shahrestani al-Thani (transl. the second Shahrestani; the first being his brother-in-law, Sayyid Muhammad-Husayn al-Musawi al-Shahrestani), was an Iranian-Iraqi Shia marja' and poet.

== Family and early life ==
al-Sharetstani was born to Sayyid Muhammad-Ali al-Marashi, and the daughter of al-Wahid al-Behbahani. His family are originally from Shahrestan, but he was born in Kermanshah, raised in Marash, and lived and died in Karbala. Al-Shahrestani adopted the surname, al-Shahrestani after his marriage and affiliation with Sayyid Muhammad-Mehdi al-Shahrestani from the Musawid al-Shahrestani family.

His lineage is as follows:

Muḥammad-Ḥusayn bin Muḥammad-ʿAli bin Ismaʿil bin Muḥammad-Bāqir bin Muḥammad-Taqi bin Attaallāh bin Mehdi bin Taj al-Dīn Ḥusayn bin Nitham al-Dīn ʿAli bin ʿAbdallāh bin Muḥammad Khān bin ʿAbd al-Karīm bin ʿAbdallāh (3rd King of Tabaristan) bin ʿAbd al-Karīm bin Muḥammad bin Murtadha ʿAli bin ʿAli Khan bin Sadiq Kamāl al-Dīn bin Qawām al-Dīn bin Sadiq Kamāl al-Dīn bin ʿAbdallāh al-Naqīb bin Muḥammad bin Abu Hāshim bin Ḥusayn bin ʿAli al-Marʿashi bin ʿAbdallāh bin Muḥammad al-Akbar bin Ḥasan al-ʿAlawi bin Ḥusayn al-Asghar bin ʿAli al-Sajjad bin Ḥusayn al-Shahid bin ʿAli Ibna Abi Talib.

== Works ==
al-Shahrestani has books in jurisprudence and principles of jurisprudence. Some of them include:

- Ghayat al-Mas'ul wa Nihayat al-Ma'mul Fi 'Ilm al-Usul.
- Shawari' al-A'lam Fi Sharh Shara'i' al-Islam.
- Tiryak Farooq (in Persian). A critique on Shaykhism.
- Talweeh al-Ishara Fi Talkhees Sharh al-Ziyara. Analysis on the exegesis of Ziyarah al-Jami'a al-Kabira by Sheikh Ahmed al-Ahsa'i.
- Tareeq al-Najat (in Persian). A critique on Christianity.
- al-Fara'ed. A book on Arabic syntax.
- Dam' al-Ayn Ala Khasa'is al-Husayn.
- Libab al-Ijtihad
- Al-Nur al-Mubin Fi Usul al-Din.
- Asal Mussaffa.

== Personal life ==
al-Shahrestani married the daughter of Sayyid Muhammad-Mehdi al-Shahrestani. He had seven sons, Muhammad-Ali, Muhamamd-Jafar, Zayn al-Abideen, Murtadha, Muhammad, Abu Talib, and Ahmed.

His great-grandson is Sayyid Jawad al-Shahrestani, the son-in-law and representative of grand Ayatollah Sayyid Ali al-Sistani.

== Death ==
al-Shahrestani died on February 25, 1898, and was buried in the Musawid al-Shahrestani crypt in the Imam Husayn shrine.

== See also ==
- al-Shahrestani family
- al-Qazwini family
- Ali al-Sistani
