= Ibrahim al-Mujab =

Custodian of the Imam Husayn Shrine (died 912)

Sayyid Ibrahim al-Mujab
- إبراهيم بن محمد المجاب
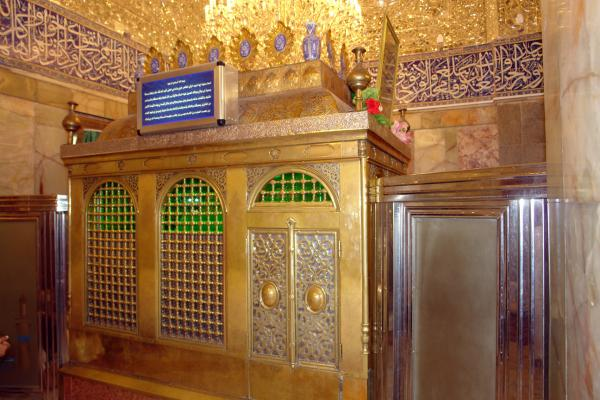
- al-Mujab's shrine inside the Husayn Shrine precinct

1st Custodian of the Imam Husayn Shrine
- In office 861–912
- Preceded by: position established
- Succeeded by: Muhammad al-Ha'iri

Personal life
- Died: 912 Karbala, Abbasid Caliphate
- Resting place: Imam Husayn Shrine
- Parent: Muhammad al-Abid (father)
- Known for: First Alid to settle in Karbala
- Other names: Tāj al-Dīn (تَاجْ الدِّينْ)
- Relatives: Musa al-Kazim (grandfather); Ali al-Rida (uncle)

Religious life
- Religion: Islam
- Denomination: Shīʿa

Sayyid Ibrāhīm ibn Muḥammad ibn Mūsā al-Kāẓim (Arabic: إبْرَاهِيم بْنِ مُحَمَّد بْنِ مُوسَى الكَاظِمْ) also known as Ibrāhīm al-Mujāb and al-Ḍarīr al-Kūfī, was the son of Muḥammad al-ʿĀbid, and grandson of Mūsā al-Kāẓim, the seventh Twelver Shia Imam. He was the first Alid to settle in Karbala, where he died, and was buried in the Imam Husayn shrine.

al-Mujab has many descendants that are known today by various names. Al Faiz is the only line of his that remained in Karbala until this day, since he settled in 861. As for his other descendants, most of them emigrated to other cities and countries, some of them are known today as Al Qazwini, Al Hamami, Al Awadi, Al Sabziwari, and Al Khirsan. It is also reported, that the scholars al-Sharif al-Radi and al-Murtada are descendants of al-Mujab.

== Biography ==
The date and place of al-Mujab's birth are unknown.

al-Mujab migrated from Kufa to Karbala in 861, after the Abbasid caliph al-Mutawakkil was killed at the hands of his son, al-Muntasir. al-Muntasir was more merciful towards the Shias, and sympathetic with the Alids, allowing them to freely visit the grave of Husayn.

al-Mujab became the first custodian of the Husayn and Abbas shrines.

It is reported that when al-Mujab entered the shrine of Husayn, he called, "Peace be upon you, O' father" to which he received an answer from the grave in a loud voice; "and with you be peace, O' my son"; and thus, became known as al-mujab, meaning "the answered one".

One of his descendants recorded the incident in poetry, stating:

مِـنْ أيْـنَ لِلْنَــاسِ مِثْــلُ جَـدِّي
مُــوْسَــى أَوْ اِبْـنُ اِبْنِهِ المُجَابْ
إذْ خَاطَبَ السِبْطُ وَهُوَ رِمْسُ
جَــــاوَبَـــهُ أَكْـــــــرَمَ الجَــــــوَابْ

Translation:

From where do the people have the like of my grandfather;
Musa, or the son of his son, al-Mujab.
As he greeted the grandson [of the prophet] whilst in his tomb,
and he replied with the most honourable reply.

== Death and resting place ==
Al-Mujab died in Karbala, in 912. He was buried in the grand courtyard of the Husayn shrine.

In 1804, al-Mujab's grave and rawaq (hallway) were added to the north west side of the Husayn shrine's precinct, under the supervision of the shrines' custodian at the time, Jawad Nasrallah, as part of an expansion of the Husayn shrine.

The zarih above his grave was renewed in 2013, by the Iranian association responsible for religious sites in Iraq.

== Descendants ==
Ibrahim al-Mujab is the father of Muhammad al-Ha'iri, the ancestor of the Faiz Sayyids who are currently the custodians of Karbala. Along with the Faiz and al-Haeris, the Abu-Ragheef, an Iraqi tribe, also claim descent from Ibrahim.

=== Abu-Ragheef ===
The Abu-Ragheef are a Sayyid Husayni Musawi tribe in southern Iraq who claim descent from Ibrahim al-Mujab through his son Ahmad. Their lineage is as follows:

1. Ali ibn Abi Talib
2. Husayn ibn Ali
3. al-Sajjad ibn Husayn
4. Muhammad al-Baqir ibn Ali
5. Jafar al-Sadiq ibn Muhammad
6. Musa al-Kadhim ibn Jafar
7. Muhammad al-Abid ibn Musa
8. Ibrahim al-Mujab ibn Muhammad
9. Sayyid Ahmad ibn Ibrahim
10. Sayyid Najm al-Din Hasan ibn Ahmad
11. Sayyid Idris ibn Hasan
12. Sayyid Ja'far ibn Idris
13. Sayyid Ibrahim ibn Ja'far
14. Sayyid Hasan ibn Ibrahim
15. Sayyid Radi al-Din ibn Hasan
16. Sayyid Jamal al-Din ibn Radi al-Din
17. Sayyid Zayn al-Din ibn Jamal al-Din
18. Sayyid Amin al-Din ibn Zayn al-Din
19. Sayyid Malir ibn Amin al-Din
20. Sayyid Amin al-Din ibn Malir
21. Sayyid Ali ibn Amin al-Din
22. Sayyid Hamd ibn Ali
23. Sayyid Muslih ibn Hamd
24. Sayyid 'Ilm ibn Muslih
25. Sayyid Hamoud ibn Ilm
26. Sayyid Dawoud ibn Hamoud
27. Sayyid Khalaf ibn Dawoud
28. Sayyid Ibrahim ibn Khalaf
29. Sayyid Dakheel ibn Ibrahim ibn Khalaf

Sayyid Dakheel is the ancestor of the Abu-Ragheef, and his grandson Sayyid Taher is their eponymous ancestor. The name Abu-Ragheef comes from an incident with Sayyid Taher. Taher's father, Sayyid Rahm, was in the Muntafiq liwā′ under the Muntafiq ruler, Prince Saadoun Nasser al-Ashkar
