= Bayn al-Haramayn =

Coordinates: 32°37′00″N 44°02′03″E

- بَيْن الحَرَمَيْن (Arabic); Bayn al-Ḥaramayn (Arabic)
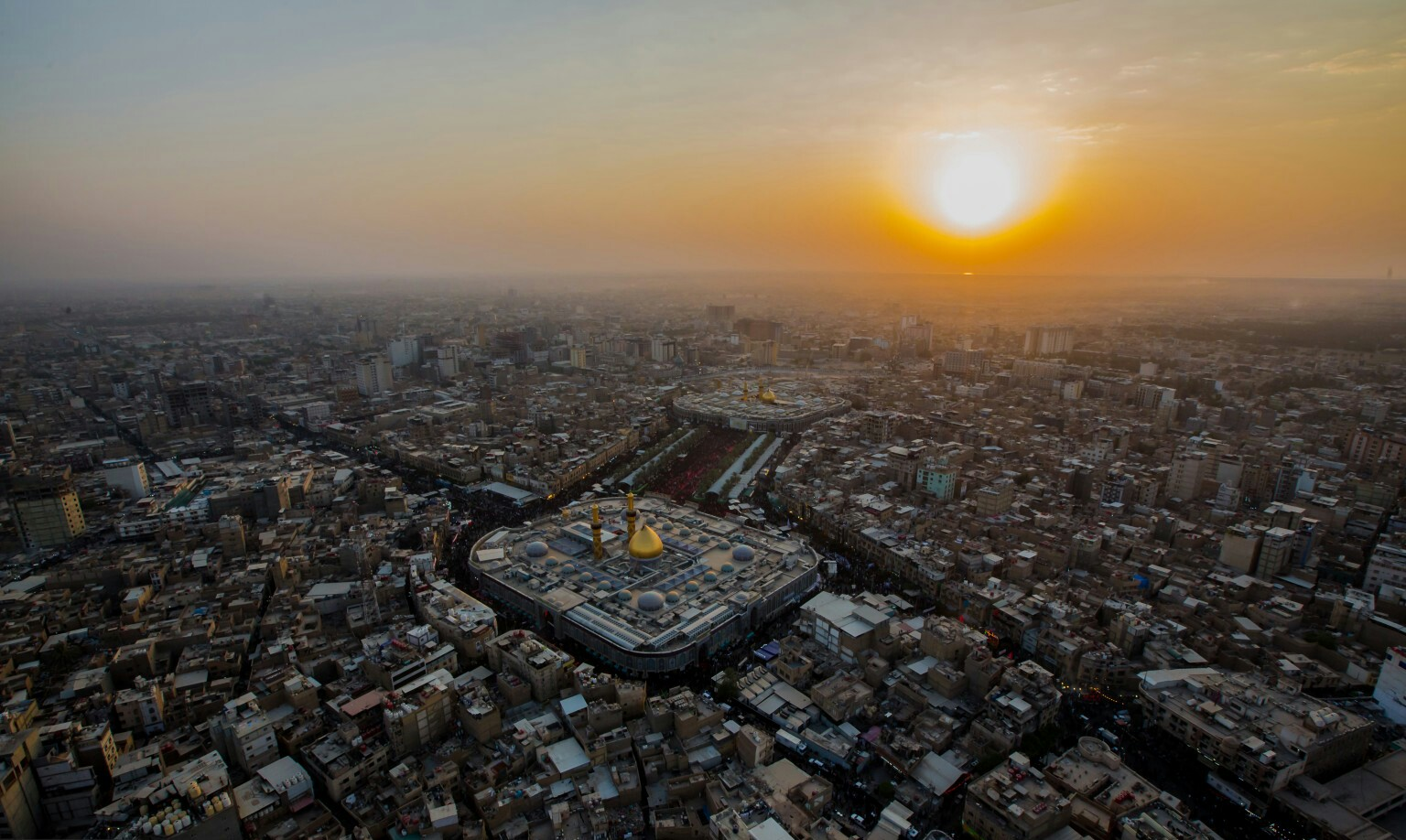
- Aerial view of Bayn al-Haramayn, with a view of the Husayn and Abbas shrines.

- Location in Iraq
- Location: Karbala, Iraq

Site notes
- Area: 48,000m²
- Visitors: 13 million (in October, 2018); 50 million (annually)

Bayn al-Haramayn (Arabic: بَيْن الحَرَمَيْن, romanized: Bayn al-Ḥaramayn), also transliterated as Bainul Haramain, is the area between the Imam Husayn Shrine and al-Abbas Shrine, which is a distance of 378 meters. It is said to be the exact place where the fighting in the Battle of Karbala took place.

In the past, the area was not an empty space between the two shrines; rather it was divided into a single main street and a number of alleyways, with residential and commercial buildings. During the Baathist era, the buildings between the two shrines were demolished to make way for the area known today as Bayn al-Haramayn. After the 2003 invasion of Iraq, the administration of the two shrines initiated a project of further developing the area, as well as the shrines to form a large unified precinct for the holy shrines of Karbala.

== Etymology ==
Bayn al-Haramayn literally means "between the two shrines". Before the destruction of the buildings between the two shrines, the area was only known as mahalat Bab al-Najaf. It consisted of alleyways and one main street called Ali al-Akbar Street. The term entered Ashura literature after the demolition of all that stood in the area, in the late 1970s, creating an open canvas between the two shrines, known in its Arabic term as, Bayn al-Haramayn.

== Before construction ==
Karbala is known by its numerous mahalat. The Bayn al-Haramayn area was known as mahalat Bab al-Najaf. It had some of the following agids (Arabic: عگد; alleyway) and taags (Arabic: طاق; an arch covering an alleyway, known by the home it extends from):

- Agid al-Damad and taag al-Damad
- Agid Sayyid Abd al-Wahab Tuma and taag Sayyid Hashim Tuma
- Agid al-Gilgawiyin
- Agid Shir Fidha
- Agid al-Chrakh
- Agid al-Tabatabaei and taag al-Tabatabaei
- Agid Hamza Bahar
- Agid Abideen

There were multiple souqs, such as Souq al-Siyyagh, Souq al-Tujar, Souq al-Sa'achiya and Souq al-Abbas. In 1909, the garrison of Karbala, Jalal Pasha, expanded the tailors market in the souq.

Karbala had a large number of Sufis (mostly of the Bektashi and Mevlevi orders) that lived in it, and they were known as derawish. A renowned Darwish Ali, used to go around the markets in Karbala reciting poetry in praise of Ali ibn Abi Talib. He would also perform hajj-like rituals in an ihram on the eve of Eid al-Adha, and perform sa'i between the two shrines, for spiritual merit.

In 1973, the Endowment Ministry of Iraq undertook the administration of holy shrines, and in 1975, a work-group was formed to reconstruct and expand the two shrines. In 1979, the project saw the demolition of buildings, historical monuments, seminary schools and old mosques as well as graves of some scholars. This new open area between the two shrines began to gradually be known as Bayn al-Haramayn.

In 1987, Saddam Hussein went to Karbala to announce a new expansion plan for the shrines and their connection with a shared square. In this project, the areas and districts around the shrines were purchased. That same year, the Iraqi government unveiled the completed projects, such as the gilding of the Imam Husayn shrine dome, as well as other projects related to the shrine's development. They also uncovered new areas in Bayn al-Haramayn that saw further more houses, shops and monuments destroyed, including a two storey mosque that was built in 1949. Hotels were erected on each side of the area.

=== Landmarks ===
There were a number of notable and historical landmarks in the area between the two shrines before its demolition. This included:

- Sanctuary of Al al-Tabatabaei - This was a shrine and cemetery at the outset of Souq al-Tujar, that had members of the al-Tabatabaei scholarly family buried in it. During the demolition in 1979, the deceased bodies of Sayyid Muhammad al-Mujahid al-Tabatabaei and his mother, Aminah al-Behbehani were exhumed, and their corpses were left on the floor by the rubble for three days. The remains were only relocated to the city's graveyard, after pressures rose from disturbed members of the public.
- Karbala Restaurant - This was the first and most popular restaurant in the area. It was at the beginning of Ali al-Akbar Street and owned by Muhammad-Taqi Salar. The restaurant used to close on Ashura, and used to distribute food to the pilgrims, free of charge. The restaurant had a basement, with a small shrine, associated with the event of a man purportedly seeing an apparition of Ali ibn Abi Talib.
- Parade of Al Nasrallah - This was a large parade that extended along Ali al-Akbar Street, owned by Muhammad (Hammoud) Nasrallah, who was the head of the traders of Karbala during the late Ottoman era.
- Masjid al-Safi - This was a mosque built by Sayyid Muhammad-Mahdi al-Shahristani in 1775. The mosque acted as a sanctuary for the pilgrims who would visit Karbala on holy occasions.
- Ali Hadla Cafe - This was a cafeteria owned by Ali Hadla. Hadla gained fame after heading a movement, which called for the youth of Karbala to protest the Ottoman's enlistment of Iraqis to their army to fight the Russians in the Russian-Ottoman war, in 1876. The protest started after the Ottoman government tried to arrest Hadla for allegedly killing an Ottoman spy. Following the protests, the central government in Baghdad sent troops to Karbala to suppress the uprising, however upon arrival to the city, they saw no civil unrest, and couldn't locate the rebels. Upon the troops return to Baghdad, they arrested approximately 70 individuals, including Hadla. They were all released a year later.

== 1991 Uprising ==
Following the 1991 uprising in Karbala, most of the buildings surrounding the shrines were completely reduced to rubble. After reclaiming the vicinity of both shrines, Saddam further opened and cleared the area surrounding the shrines and in between them, to make control over the area easier. The expanded area became 350 metres long and 160 metres wide.

In 1997, the city council laid cement to the damaged floor, and planted palm trees along two columns of the area.

== Post 2003 ==
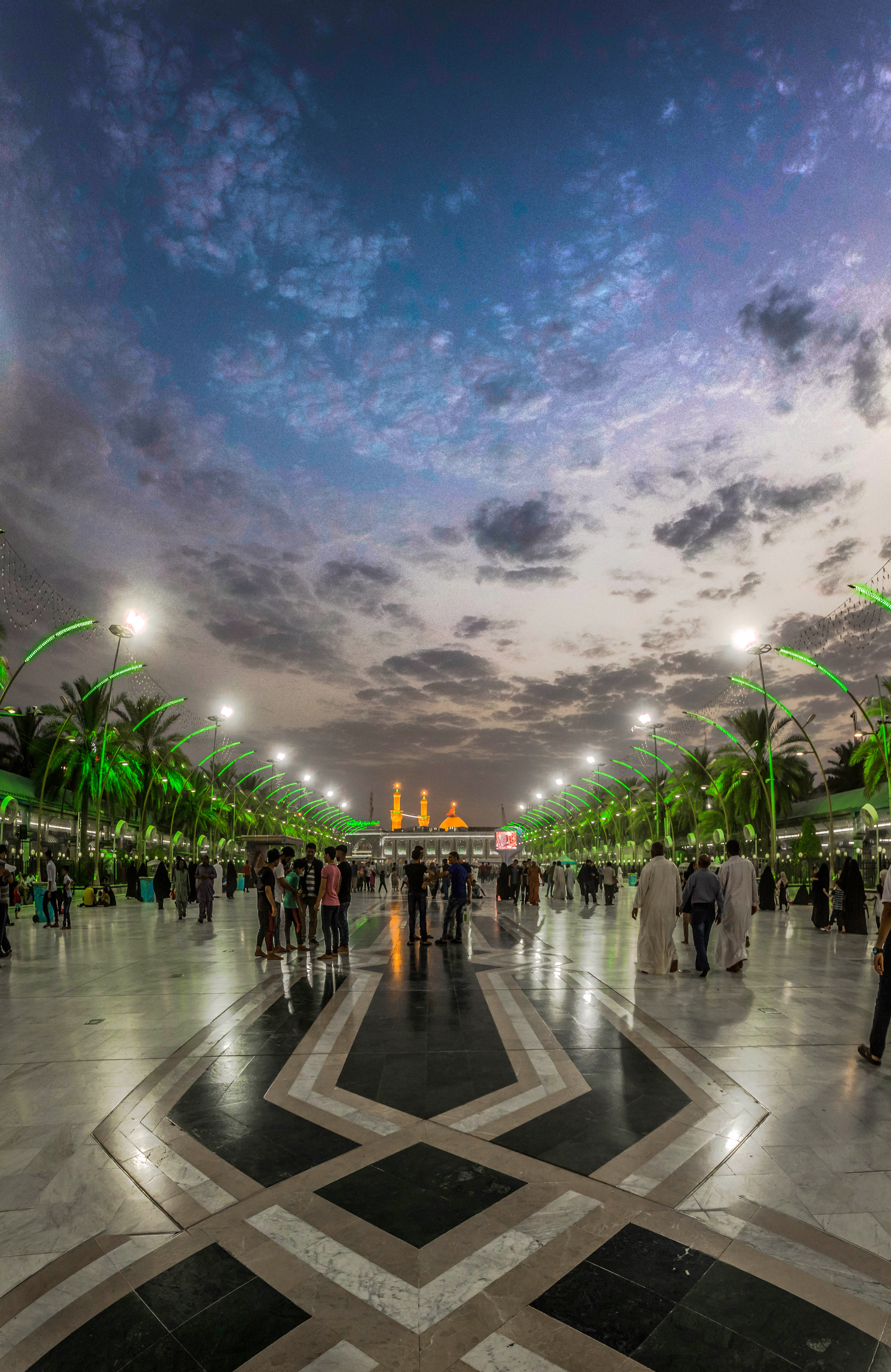
Image from Bayn al-Haramayn, looking towards the Imam Husayn shrine.

After the Iraqi invasion of 2003, the new Iraqi government initiated an expansion project for all religious sites in Karbala. This was to provide services for the pilgrims and facilitate the traffic between the two shrines.

By 2013, Bayn al-Haramayn was paved with stone. The Iraqi Ministry of Reconstruction and Residence covered the floor of the area, with Italian marble. The project included the development of infrastructural and electric installations, ablution facilities, cooling systems, closed-circuit cameras, and auditory devices. The stones used for the courtyard of Bayn al-Haramayn are allegedly similar to the ones laid in the courtyard of Masjid al-Haram.

== See also ==
- Arba'een
- Imam Husayn Shrine
- Al-Abbas Mosque
- Holiest sites in Shia Islam
- Karbala
