= University of Karbala =

Public university in Karbala, Iraq

Coordinates: 32°36′33″N 44°0′11″E

- جامعـــة كربـــلاء
- Type: Public university
- Established: 2002
- President: Prof. Dr. Sabah Wajid Ali
- Location: Karbala, Karbala Governorate, Iraq
- Website: www.uokerbala.edu.iq

The University of Karbala (UoK) is a university located in the city of Karbala, Iraq. The university was founded in 2002. The university has an impact role in the academic research.

== Colleges ==
- College of Veterinary medicine
- College of Medicine
- College of Dentistry
- College of Pharmacy
- College of Engineering
- College of Agriculture
- College of Law
- College of Education for Pure Science
- College of Education for the Humanities
- College of Science
- College of Management and Economics
- College of Applied Medical Sciences
- College of Tourism
- College of Physical Education and Sports
- College of Information Technology and Computers
- College of Islamic Studies
- College of Nursing

== See also ==
- List of universities in Iraq
