= List of airports in Iraq =

This is a list of airports in Iraq, grouped by type and sorted by location.

== List ==
Location/city served	ICAO	IATA	Airport name
Civil airports			
Baghdad	ORBI	BGW	Baghdad International Airport (New Al Muthana Air Base)
Basra (Basrah)	ORMM	BSR	Basra International Airport
Erbil (Arbil; Hawler)	ORER	EBL	Erbil International Airport
Harir	ORBR		Al-Harir Air Base
Iskandariya	ORAI		Al Iskandariyah Airport
Karbala			Karbala International Airport (under development)
Karbala			Karbala Northeast Airport (Imam Hussein Int'l Airport) (under development)
Kirkuk	ORKK	KIK	Kirkuk International Airport (Al-Hurriya Air Base)
Mosul	ORBM	OSM	Mosul International Airport
Najaf	ORNI	NJF	Al Najaf International Airport
Nasiriyah	ORTL	XNH	Nasiriyah International Airport
Qasr Tall Mihl	ORQT		Qasr Tall Airport
Sulaymaniyah (Slemani)	ORSU	ISU	Sulaimaniyah International Airport
Tikrit	ORTK		Tikrit East Airport
Tikrit	ORTS		Tikrit South Airport
Umm Qasr	ORUQ		Umm Qasr Airport
Military airports			
An Numaniyah	ORAN		An Numaniyah Air Base
Al-Suwaira			As Suwayrah Air Base
Amarah			Amarah Air Base (Contingency Operating Site Garry Owen)
Baghdad			Al Rasheed Air Base
Baghdad			Muthenna Air Base
Bamarni	ORBB	BMN	Bamarni Air Base
Balad	ORBD		Balad Air Base (Al-Bakir Airbase)
Hit	ORAA	IQA	Al Asad Airbase
Habbaniyah	ORAT		Al Taqaddum Air Base
Jalibah	ORJA		Jalibah Southeast Air Base
Kirkuk			Kaywan (K-1) Air Base
Kut	ORUB		Ubaydah Bin Al Jarrah Air Base
Nukhayb			Mudaysis Air Base
Qayyarah	ORQW		Qayyarah Airfield West
Shaibah			Shaibah Air Base
Taji	ORTI		Camp Taji (Camp Cooke)
Tal Afar	ORTF		Tal Afar Air Base (FOB Sykes)
Tikrit	ORSH		Camp Speicher (Majid al Tamimi Airbase/Tikrit Air Academy)
Tikrit			Tikrit South Air Base (FOB Remagen)

== See also ==
- Transport in Iraq
- List of the busiest airports in the Middle East
- List of airports by ICAO code: O#OR - Iraq
- Wikipedia: WikiProject Aviation/Airline destination lists: Asia#Iraq
