= Karbala International Airport =

Karbala International Airport ممطار كربلاء الدولي
- IATA: KHB; ICAO: ORKR

Summary
- Airport type: Public (Under Development)
- Location: Karbala Governorate, Iraq
- Coordinates: 32°21′53″N 44°12′14″E

Map
- Location within Iraq

Karbala International Airport (Arabic: مطار كربلاء الدولي, romanized: Maṭār Karbalāʾ Ad-Duwalī) is an airport under development in Karbala Governorate, Iraq. It is located between the cities of Najaf and Karbala, about 20 miles (32 km) to the southeast of Karbala. It is expected to be Iraq's largest airport upon completion, it was expected to be open in November 2024-April 2025, but there has been no official statement about the reopening date since then.

== Airlines and destinations ==
Currently, there are no destinations to or from Karbala.

== History and description ==
The foundation stone of Karbala International Airport was laid by Shaikh Abdul-Mahdi al-Karbala'i, a representative of Grand Ayatollah Ali as-Sistani, and Chief Cleric of Imam Husayn Holy Shrine, in January 2017. It is being constructed by the United Kingdom's Copperchase Ltd., and designed by the French ADPI Company. At 4.5 km (2.8 miles), the airport's runway is the longest of its kind in Iraq, the only one in the country capable of receiving the Airbus A380, the world's largest passenger aircraft. According to Al-Karbala'i, it was not meant to compete with other airports, but only to serve pilgrims going to the Mosques of Imam Husayn and Abbas.

The airport has two terminals with a total area of 42,000,000 square meters with an annual capacity of approximately 4 million passengers, and 265 aircraft per day. Additionally it has a 6 km taxi network, and a modern control tower.

== See also ==
- Imam Husayn ibn Ali
- Abbas ibn Ali
- List of airports in Iraq
