= 2007 Imam Abbas mosque bombing =

2007 Bombing in Karbala, Iraq

Al Abbas mosque bombing
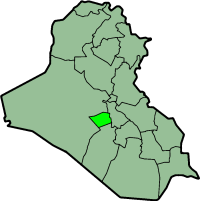
- Location of Karbala
- Location: Karbala, Iraq
- Date: April 28, 2007
- Target: Shia pilgrims
- Attack type: Suicide car bomb
- Deaths: 68
- Injuries: 162-170

The 2007 Al Abbas mosque bombing occurred on April 28, 2007 when a suicide car bomb exploded in front of the al-‘Abbās Mosque in Karbala, Iraq. At least 68 people were killed and about 162 people were injured in the Iraqi city of Karbala. The bomb exploded near the golden-domed mosque. Karbala is considered the second most important shrine city for the Shia. Security officials said the car bomb was parked near a cement barrier intended to keep traffic away from the Imam Abbas and Imam Husayn shrines, which draw thousands of Shiite pilgrims from Iran and other countries.

== See also ==
- 2003 Karbala bombings
- 2007 Karbala bombings
- Holy sites in Iraq
