= Siege of Karbala (1843) =

Ottoman victory in Iraq

Date	January, 1843
Location	Karbala, Ottoman Iraq
Result	Ottoman victory
Territorial changes	Ottomans reassert control over Karbala

Belligerents
Ottoman Empire; (Ottoman Empire) Baghdad Eyalet	Al-Muntafiq; Local Shia gangs of Karbala; Supported by: Qajar Iran

Commanders and leaders
(Ottoman Empire) Najib Pasha	Thamir ibn Sa'dun (executed); Ibrahim al-Zafrani †

Strength
Unknown	Unknown

Casualties and losses
400 killed	4,000 – 6,000 killed
- ~ 15% of the city's civilan population massacred

The Siege of Karbala (1843) was a military confrontation between the Al-Muntafiq Emirate together with the local gangs of Karbala in Ottoman Iraq and the Ottoman Empire.

== Background ==
After the collapse of the Safavid dynasty, Shia clerics fled to Iraq. Karbala being the place of the Martyrdom of Husayn ibn Ali became the alternative to Isfahan and held the most dynamic clerical community. In 1842, Karbala had 14 local gangs each with 60 to 400 members, with a total of 2,000-2,500 members. They collected protection money from residents and pilgrims. Many of them were known to be criminals and debtors from Iraq and defectors from Iranian and Ottoman armies. Ibrahim al Zafrani who was a mixed Iranian-Arab and of lower class, headed the largest gang in the city composed of Iranians and Arabs.

In Karbala and Najaf, Persian scholars succeeded in asserting their influence over the religious affairs of the cities by dominating the Arab scholars. The dispute between the Akhbari and the fundamentalists ended in a victory of the fundamentalists, many of which were Persian who occupied shia religious leadership positions in Iraq. These migrations took place during a time of constant conflict between Arab shi'ite tribes and ottomans which placed the Arab shi'ites in a difficult position. The shi'ite Arabs often showed resentment with the tribes, the Iranian settlers preserved the knowledge, culture and loyalty to Iran.

The walls across the city of Karbala which was originally built against the Wahhabi attacks on Karbala in turn enabled the inhabitants of the city to thwart Ottoman authority onto the city. Najib pasha argued that the walls created a safe haven for gangs (yaramazlar) and various criminal activities as well as a storage site of loots. The Wahhabi attacks gave the Qajar monarch Fath-Ali Shah Qajar to intervene in Karbala. He sent 300 baluch troops, however years later when their salary was cut off, many of the troops settled down and formed gangs in the city.

== Siege ==
In 1842, Muhammad Najib replaced Ali Rıza Pasha, who advocated for the end of Karbala's independent authority and for a centralised ottoman authority over Karbala. By October, the failure to send supplies to Baghdad which was a symbol recognition of the central authority over Karbala and the refusal of entry even as a pilgrim made Najib more determined to establish a military garrison in the city. Zafrani declared to resist the Pasha's entry to the city, who was ready to use military force against the city. When Najib camped at Musayyib, he was received by a deputation from the city by the nominal governors. Before the party left for Karbala to persuade the city's population for agreement over some of the terms of the Pasha, Najib requested to persuade the Iranian faction to dissociate themselves from the "girami" faction or otherwise to quit the town or a quarter of the population to take refugee in the shrines of Husayn ibn Ali and Abbas ibn Ali. Najib assured the governors that anyone seeking refugee in the houses would be secured. The Iranian consulate in Baghdad is said to send 2 letters to Rashti for evacuation of the Iranians in the city, however Sayyid later maintained that he never received the letter to this effect. Rashti tried to resolve the crisis peacefully, he went to Sa'adullah Pasha, the commander of the campaign and offered that they hand over some of the leaders of the Al-Yarmaz as hostages to them and that the ottomans withdraw their forces to al-Musayyib, leaving 500 ottoman troops outside the city wall, whose entrance will coincide with the departure of the Yarmaz (Iranian) hostages. Sa'adullah presented the offer to Najib Pasha. On 22 December 1842, Najib handed over the hostages, who were the family members of Zafrani and Mirza Saleh. Sa'adullah was displeased with the Iranians due to the capture of the Ottoman cannons.

In 1843, the ottomans launched a military assault of Karbala in order to reassert their control over the city. After a siege, a battle took place between the gangs and the ottomans in which 15% of the total population of the city was killed. Ottomans emerged victorious and set a sunni governor in charge of the city, a sunni prayer leader and a sunni judge to arbitrate conflicts even between the shi'ites themselves.

On 13 January, Najib Pasha stormed the city, where an estimated 4,000 people were massacred. About 60-400 people sought refuge in Rashti's residence. Upon entrance, Najib was greeted in the Shrine of Husayn by the party of its surviving notables including Hajj Mahdi Kamuna, the deputy keeper of the keys.

The ottomans were said to have eliminated the "Iranian enclave" as mentioned by western and Turkish studies. During the battle, many craftsmen were seen in Iranian dresses. The ottomans killed and expelled the leaders of the Iranian ( Lutiya ) faction during the conflict.

== See also ==
- Wahhabi sack of Karbala
- Wahhabi War
- Wahhabi raids on Najaf
