= Karbala Northeast Airport =

Domestic Airport

- IATA: none; ICAO: none

Summary
- Airport type: Public (Under Development)
- Location: Karbala Governorate, Iraq
- Elevation AMSL: 313 ft / 95 m
- Coordinates: 32°45′20″N 044°07′39″E

Map

Runways
Direction	Length		Surface
Direction	ft	m	Surface
12/30	10,000	3,030	Asphalt

Karbala Northeast Airport, also known as "Imam Hussein International Airport", is a regional airport under development in the Karbala Governorate of Iraq. It is located to the northeast of the city of Karbala.

== History ==
It is a former Iraqi Air Force auxiliary airfield consisting of a 10,000 feet (3.0 kilometres) runway and a small aircraft parking ramp. It was apparently abandoned after the 1991 Gulf War and was seized by U.S.-led Coalition forces during Operation Iraqi Freedom in March 2003.

Aerial imagery shows that the runway has been resurfaced; however, the airport has not yet registered with the International Air Transport Association (IATA) nor does it have aircraft on its parking ramp.

== See also ==
- Imam Husayn ibn Ali
- Abbas ibn Ali
- List of airports in Iraq
