= 1915 uprising in Karbala =

Arab uprising against the Ottoman Empire

Coordinates: 32.616667°N 44.033333°E

- Part of the Mesopotamian campaign
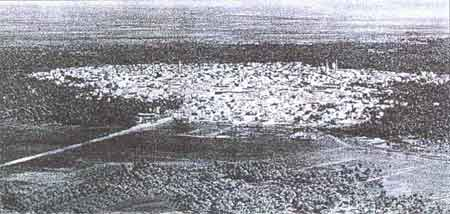
- Aerial view of Karbala, 1918
Date	27 June 1915
Location	Karbala, Ottoman Iraq
Result	Rebel victory
Territorial changes	Ottomans ousted from Karbala

Belligerents
Rebels: Bani Hasan tribe; Ottoman deserters	Ottoman Empire

Commanders and leaders
No centralized leadership	(Ottoman Empire) Unknown
- Location within Iraq

The 1915 uprising in Karbala was an Arab uprising against the Ottoman Empire that took place in June 1915.

== Background ==
Earlier, the Ottoman defeat in the Battle of Shaiba had damaged the authority of the Ottomans in the eyes of the Arabs, and this was exacerbated by the successful ousting of the Ottomans in an uprising in Najaf, which showed the residents of Karbala the potency of a revolt, which they were willing to participate in since the Ottomans had been plundering food, money, and possessions from Karbalans to support the war effort. Emissaries from Najaf had also begun encouraging an uprising in Karbala. The successful ousting of the Ottomans in Najaf had also turned a potential revolt into a matter of civic pride: popular rhetoric included questions such as "Are the people of Najaf better than us, or braver, or more manly?".

== Uprising ==
The uprising began on 27 June 1915, when the Bani Hasan tribe attacked government buildings in Karbala. Ottoman deserters were also amongst the rebels. The rebel tribesmen, lacking any centralized leadership, burned municipal buildings, government schools, a hospital, and 200 dwellings in the suburbs, most of them belonging to Persians living and trading in the Arab community. Charles R. H. Tripp notes that although the uprising was anti-Ottoman in a broad sense, it was not in support of the British war effort and instead intended to grant the city higher administrative autonomy. The uprising ended with an Ottoman withdrawal, securing a rebel victory and Karbala's independence from the Ottoman Empire.

== Aftermath ==
After becoming independent from the Ottoman Empire, Karbala turned into a place of refuge for Ottoman deserters. However, Karbala suffered from a lack of centralized leadership, and was unable to establish contact with the British forces to the south due to tribes still loyal to the Ottoman Empire separating them. The Ottoman Empire re-established control of Karbala in 1916 following their victory in the Siege of Kut.

== See also ==
- 1991 uprising in Karbala
