= Ruins of Mujada =

Coordinates: 32°20′55″N 43°48′15″E

The Ruins of Mujada or the Lighthouse of al-Mawqada (Arabic: المنارة الموقدة) is a historic ruin located to the west of the city of Karbala, Iraq. The ruins sit in the middle of the desert, and around 40 km (25 miles) away from the city. The ruin is cylindrical shaped, and it reaches more than 30 m (98 feet) from sea level. The historical origin of the ruins is unknown.

== See also ==
- Mesopotamia
