= Al-Abbas Shrine =

Mosque in Karbala, Iraq

- حَرَم أَبا الْفَضْل الْعَبَّاس
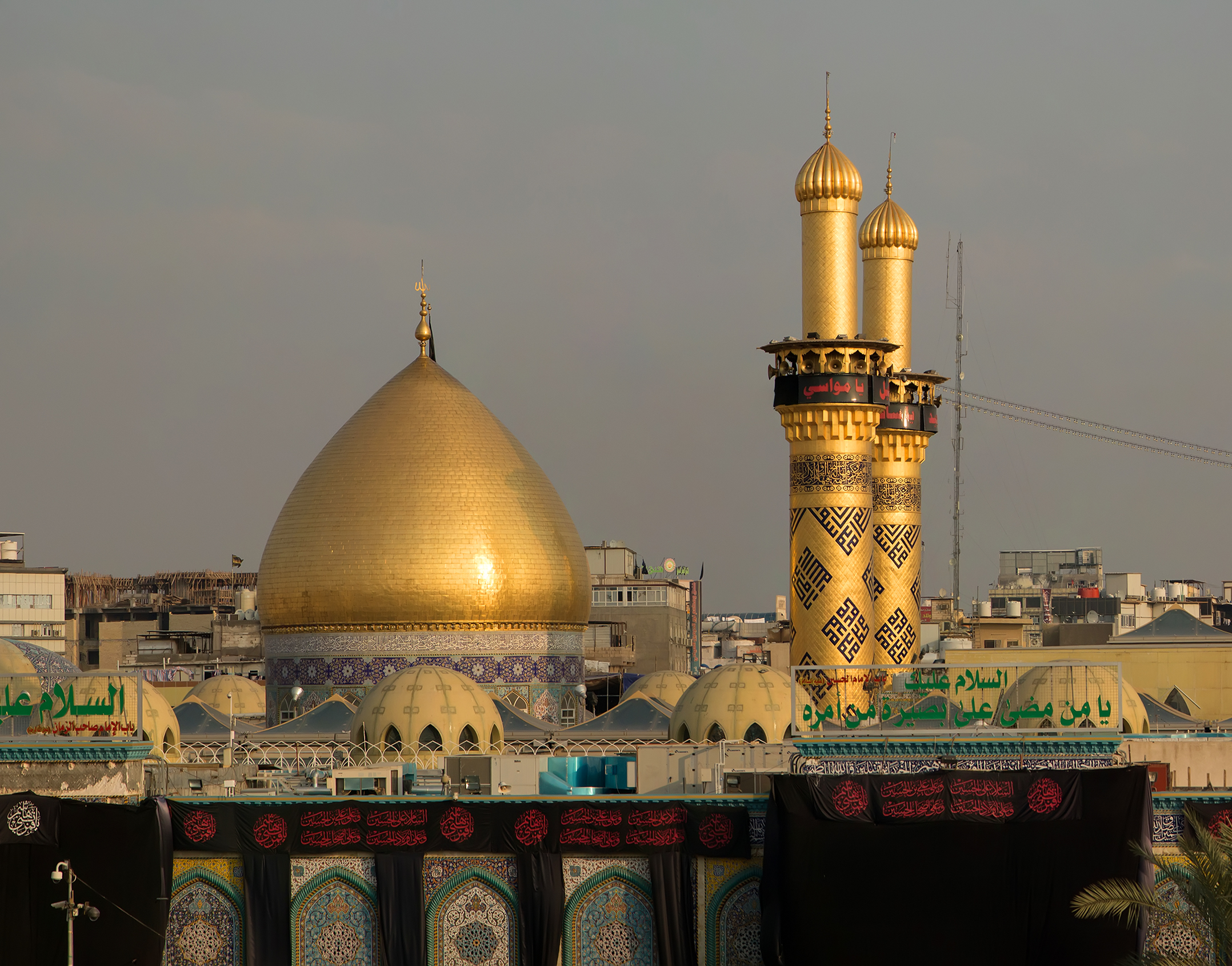
- The gold-gilded dome and minarets, in 2014

- Location of the shrine in Iraq

Religion
- Affiliation: Shia Islam
- Ecclesiastical or organisational status: Shrine
- Status: Active

Location
- Location: Karbala, Karbala Governorate
- Country: Iraq
- Interactive map of Al-Abbas Shrine
- Coordinates: 32°37′1.88″N 44°2′10.38″E

Architecture
- Type: Shi’i mosque
- Style: Islamic architecture

Specifications
- Dome: One
- Minaret: Two
- Materials: Gold; silver

The Al-Abbas Shrine (Arabic: حَرَم أَبا الْفَضْل الْعَبَّاس, romanized: Ḥaram ʿAba al-Faḍl al-ʿAbbās) is the mausoleum of Abbas ibn Ali and a Shi'ite mosque, situated near the Imam Husayn shrine, located in Karbala, in the Karbala Governorate of Iraq. Abbas was son of Ali ibn Abi Talib and the half-brother of both Imam Hasan and Imam Husayn. Abbas ibn Ali was Husayn's flag-bearer in the Battle of Karbala and chief of his caravans. One of the holiest sites in Shia Islam, the shrine is revered by Shia Muslims who visit it every year, especially in the month of Muharram.

Environmental effects over the years have caused the Euphrates river to change course. Nearly 1,400 years after the Battle of Karbala, the river flows across the grave of Abbas and encircles it. It is said that the Euphrates has come to ‘Abbās now.

Since 2012, the shrine has undergone a series of enhancements and additions, such as the re-gilding of the dome, and more recently covering the former courtyard with a roof to provide improved accommodation for the millions of pilgrims who visit the shrine annually, and who come from all over the world.

== History and design ==
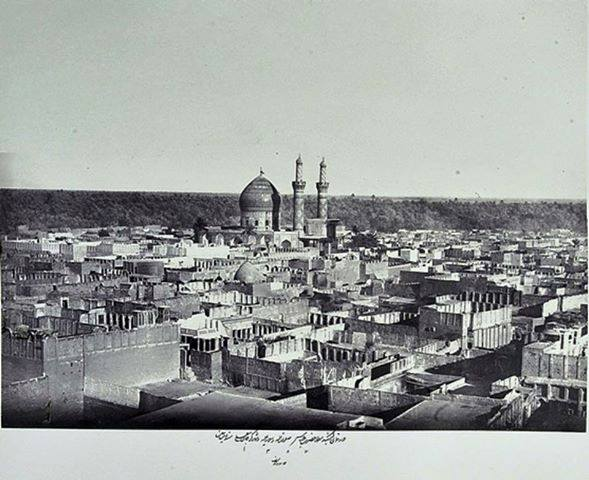
The shrine c. 1890s, prior to its dome being gilded with gold tiles

Emperors and kings of various dynasties have offered valuable gifts and gems to the shrine of Al-Abbas ibn Ali. In 1622, Abbas Shah Safavi ordered the decoration of the grave's dome. He built a window around the grave and organized the precinct.

During the Ottoman era, the shrine was reconstructed by the Ottoman Sultans Suleiman the Magnificent, Murad III, and Murad IV.

The majority of the modern design was done by Persian and Central Asian architects. The central teardrop shaped dome is an ornately decorated structure, with an internal and external dome. The internal dome visible from the inside is ornately decorate with fine mirror work. Two tall minarets stand on the domes sides, and were gilded in gold in the 2007 renovation works. The tomb is covered with pure gold and surrounded by a trellis of silver, along with Iranian carpets rolled out on the floors.

== Renovation ==
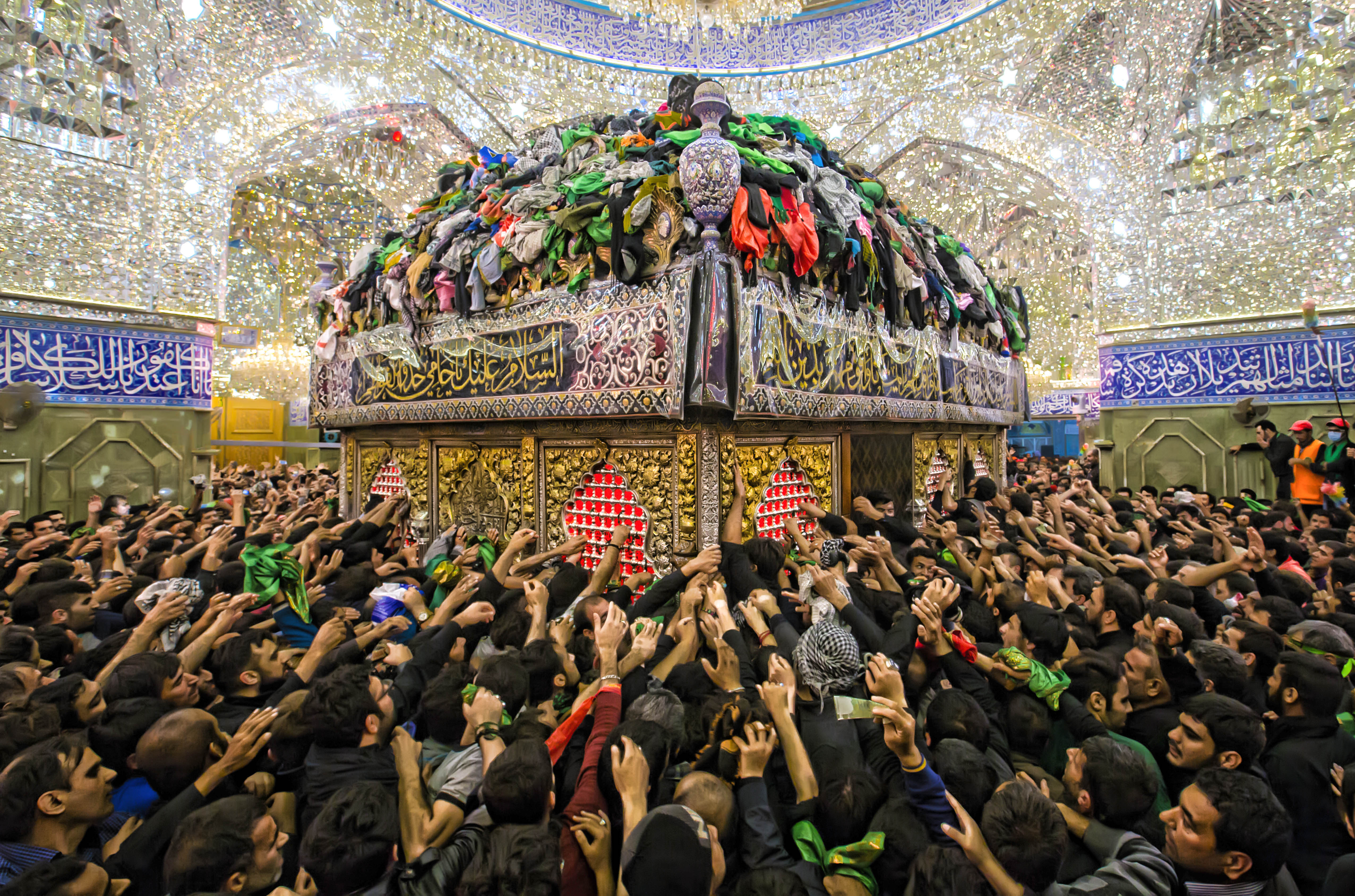
Tomb of Abbas ibn Ali

Beginning in 2012, the Al Abbas mosque underwent extensive renovations intended to improve the ability of the shrine to accommodate the millions of pilgrims who visit each year. The renovations included rebuilding the wall surrounding the shrine and turning it into a multi-story building housing museums, offices, and additional prayer halls. The dome and minaret have also been re-gilded, and the shrine's courtyard has been covered with a roof.

In 2014, construction began on a basement intended to further accommodate pilgrims. The basement is located under the perimeter of the main courtyard and involves systematically closing off parts of the courtyard and then excavating the current court yard. The project dealt with foundational issues of the shrine and reinforced the structure whose foundation has water gaps in it; as part of the Euphrates runs around the grave of Abbas. When complete, pilgrims will have access to the sardab of Abbas and it will be the closest point to the actual grave. In March 2016, a new Zarih for the grave of Abbas was completed. It is the first Zarih to be fully built in Iraq by Iraqi hands, and was duly inaugurated on the 13th of Rajab the birth of Imam Ali, on April 21, 2016.

== Timeline ==
Year		Event	Notes
AH	CE	Event	Notes
61	680	October 10: Al-Abbas ibn Ali was buried at this location.	
1032	1622	Abbas Shah Safavi decorated the dome of the shrine, built glass encasings around the grave, arranged the porticoes and the yard, constructed the lobby of the first gate of the sanctuary, and sent precious carpets from Iran.	
1115	1703	Nadir Shah sent gifts to the shrine and had it further decorated.	
1117	1705	The vizier of Nadir Shah visited the shrine, reconstructed the porticoes, remade the encasings around the grave, and added a chandelier.	
1216	1801	Wahhabis attacked Karbalā, damaged the shrine, and robbed all precious decorative items.	
1232	1817	Fat'h ‘Alī Shāh Qājār reconstructed the dome of the shrine, gifted new chandeliers and lustrous pieces of decoration to the holy shrines, and had other constructions carried out.	
1355	1936	The custodian of the shrine, Sayyid Murtadhā, rebuilt the silver gate in the golden hallway leading towards the room of the tomb.	
1411	1991	March: A violent uprising against the regime of Saddam Hussein occurred in the city, following the Persian Gulf War.	
1415	1994	Repairs to the shrine from the damage done in 1991 were finally completed.	
1425	2004	March 2: At least six explosions occurred during the ‘Āshūrā' commemorations, killing 85 people and wounding 230.	
1426	2006	January 5: Suicide bombers among the crowd between the two shrines killed at least 60 people and injured more than 100.	
1428	2007	April 28: A suicide car bomber killed at least 58 people and wounded 170 others as people were heading towards evening prayers.	
1429	2008	September 11: A bomb was detonated 500 m (1,600 ft) from the shrine which killed one civilian, wounded three others, and damaged buildings in the area.	
1434	2012	Construction of a roof covering the former courtyard of the shrine began, this comes amidst many efforts by the administration of the Al-Abbas Shrine to accommodate pilgrims better and renovate the shrines.	
1436	2014	In late October, the shrine saw the commencement of one of its largest projects ever – the construction of a basement intended to further accommodate pilgrims. The basement is to be located under the perimeter of the main courtyard.	
1438	2016	In April, the Zarih, which stands over the grave of Abbas was replaced, the old Zarih had been installed in 1964 under the commission of Sayyed Mohsen Al-Hakim, the new Zarih is the first to be completely built in Iraq and by Iraqi craftsmen.	

== Customary greeting ==
«السلام علیک یا ابوالفضل العباس»
"As Salamo Alaika Ya Abolfazl El-Abbas"
"Peace be upon you, O Abu al-Fadl al-Abbas"

It is customary among Muslims, especially Iranian Shi'ite Muslims, to whisper, either in person when approaching the shrine or when viewing a picture of the shrine on media: «السَّلامُ عَلَیْکْ یا اَبَا الْفَضْلِ الْعَبّاسَ», "Alsũlãạmu ʿAlaẙ̰ḵ̊ y̰ā Aabā Al̊faḍ̊li Al̊ʿabãạs"; This is an Arabic phrase which meaning: "Peace be upon you, O Abu al-Fadl al-Abbas." This action called "giving greetings to the Imams."

== Titles ==
Abbas ibn Ali was a young man with a good reputation among the people. He was given many good nicknames, including:

→ «ابوالفضل»: "Abo al-Fazl", his Kunya, literally means "The Father of Goodness";
→ «عباس»: "Ab'baas", literally means "The Lion of the Forest, a Lion from Whom Lions Flee";
→ «قمر بنی هاشم»: "Qamar-e Bani Hashem", literally means "The Moon of the Tribe Banu Hashem", because his charming appearance attracted attention, and his face was radiant like the full moon. This title was given to Abbas ibn Ali because of his beauty and handsome face;
→ «سقّا»: "Saq'qaa", literally means "Someone Who Gives Water to the Thirsty." At the age of 33, on the day of Ashura, 10 Muharram 61 AH, while fetching water for his thirsty brother Hussein, Abbas ibn Ali lost his hands in the war, causing the waterskin to fall from his hands, and was then killed. The principle of providing water to the thirsty in Islamic religious teachings, especially Shia Islam, is very popular and reminds everyone of Abbas ibn Ali.
→ «بابُ‌الحَوائِج»: "Baab ol-Hawaa'Ej", literally means "Entrance of Desires". It is well known among Muslims that whatever you ask of Abbas ibn Ali in your heart, he will surely grant it. That is because of the reputation he has with God.
→ «بابُ الحُسین»: "Baab ol-Hossein", literally means "The Way to See Hussein". Since childhood, Abbas ibn Ali had served his older brother Hussein intensely and cared for him very much, to the point that he lost his life in the process.

Overall, Abbas ibn Ali is known among Muslims, especially Shi'ites, for his chivalry, loyalty, and devotion to God.

== Gallery ==
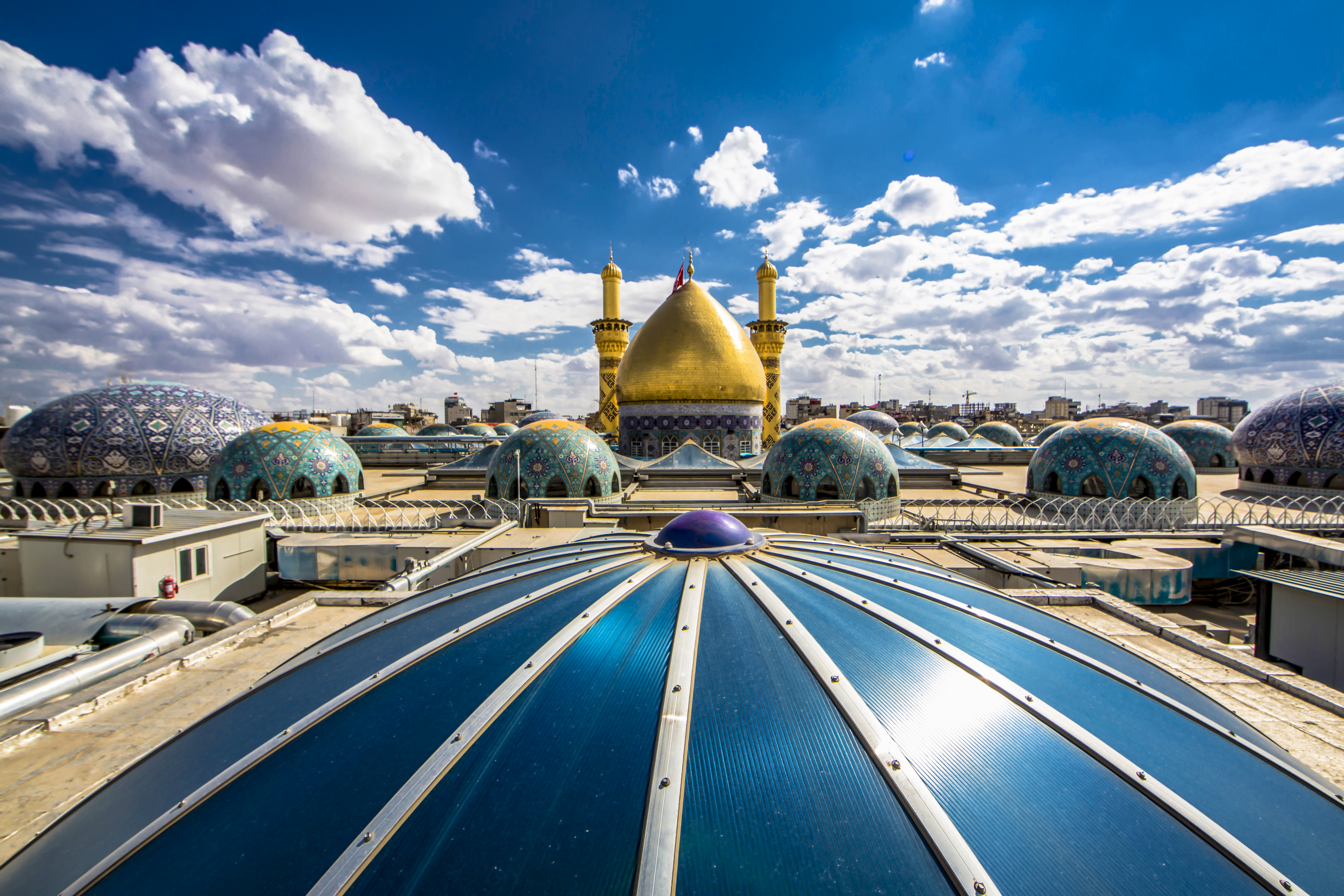

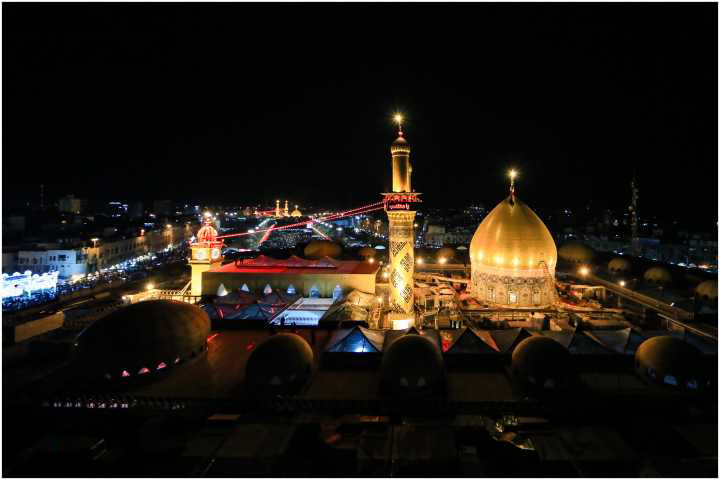

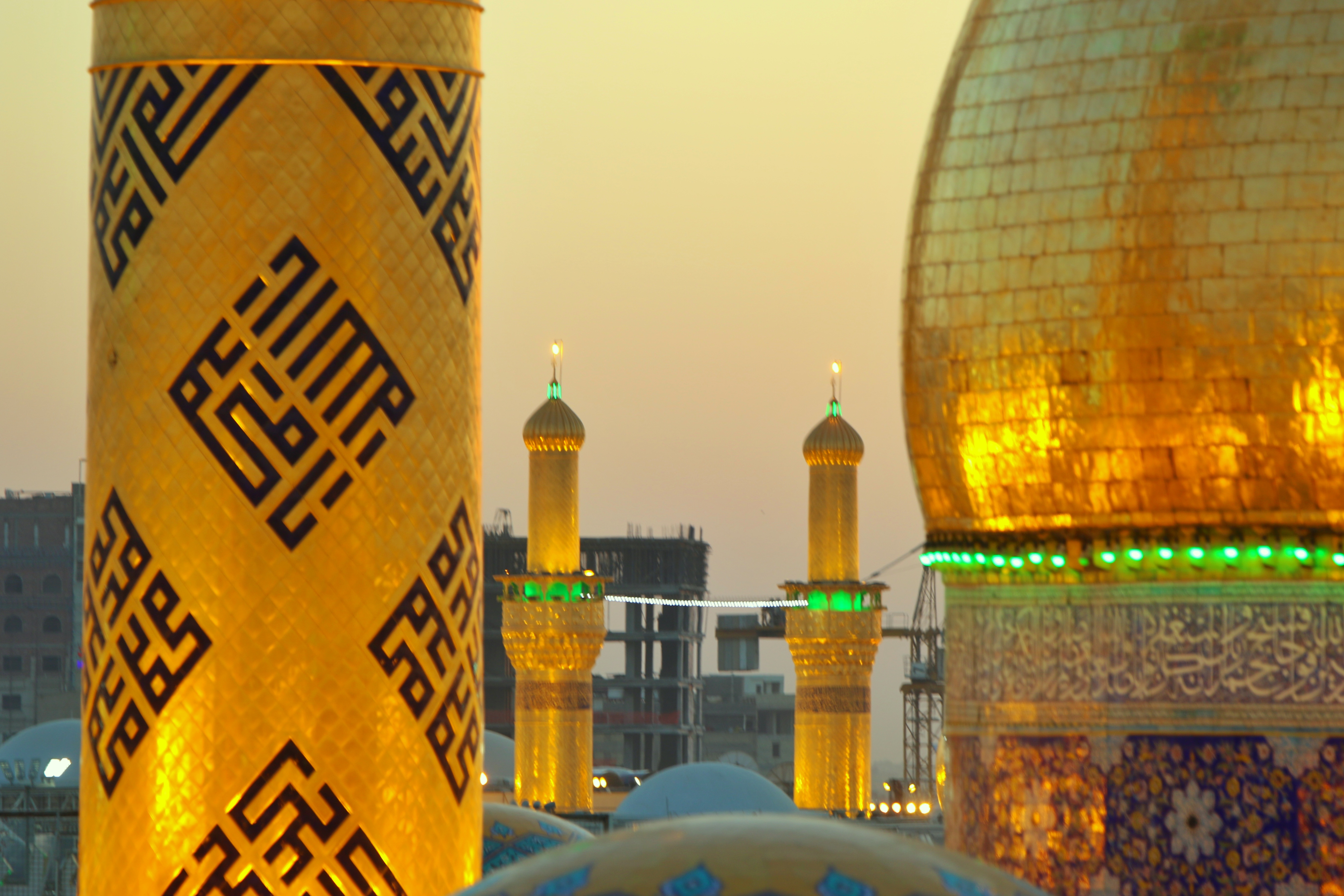

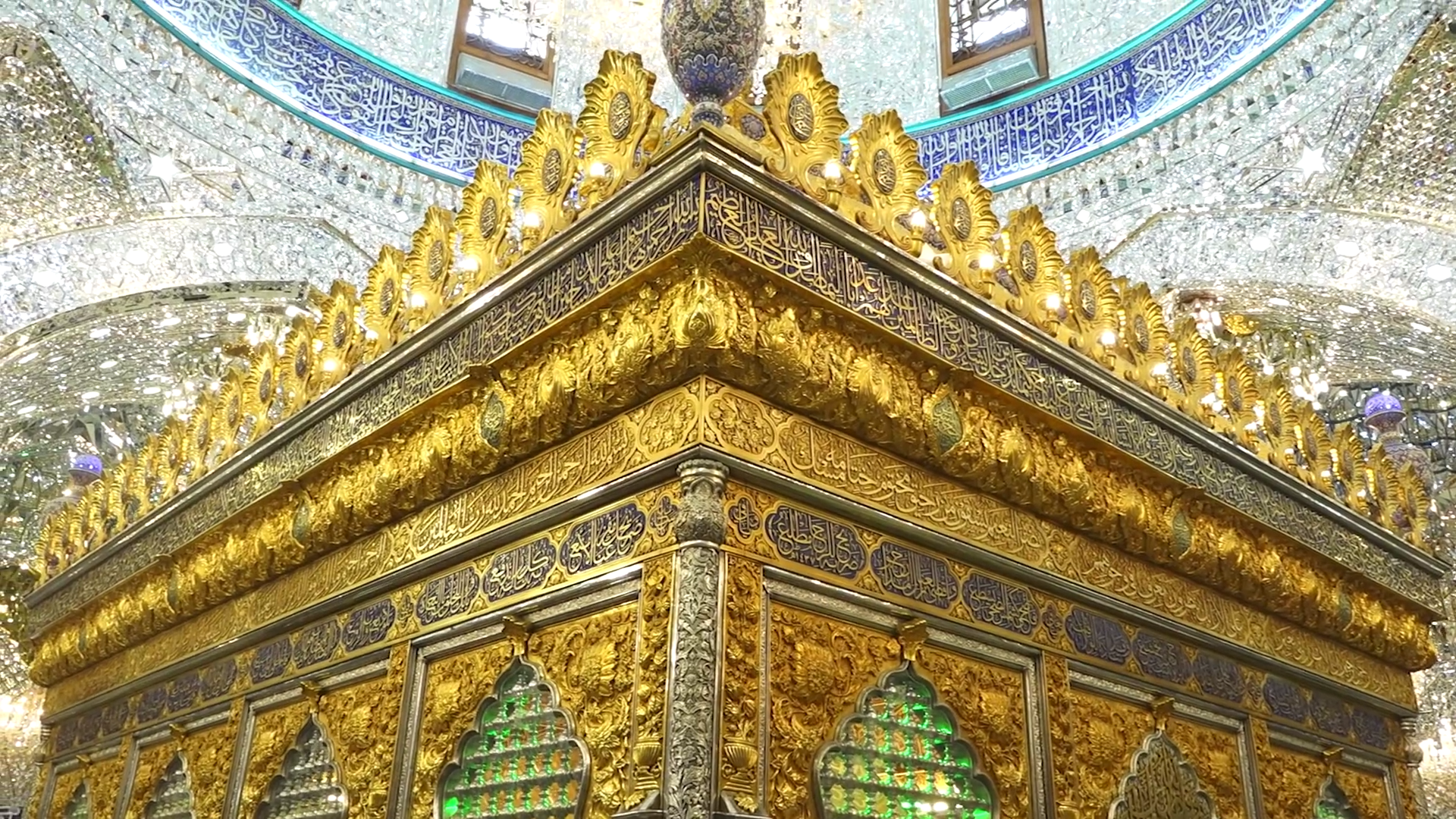

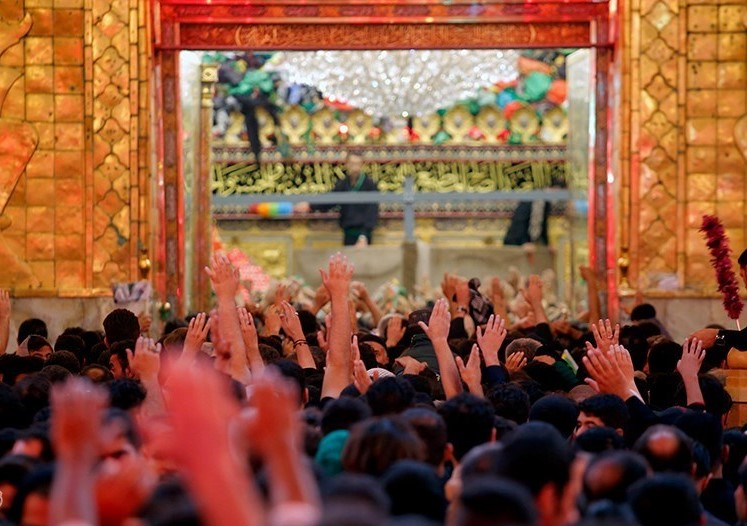

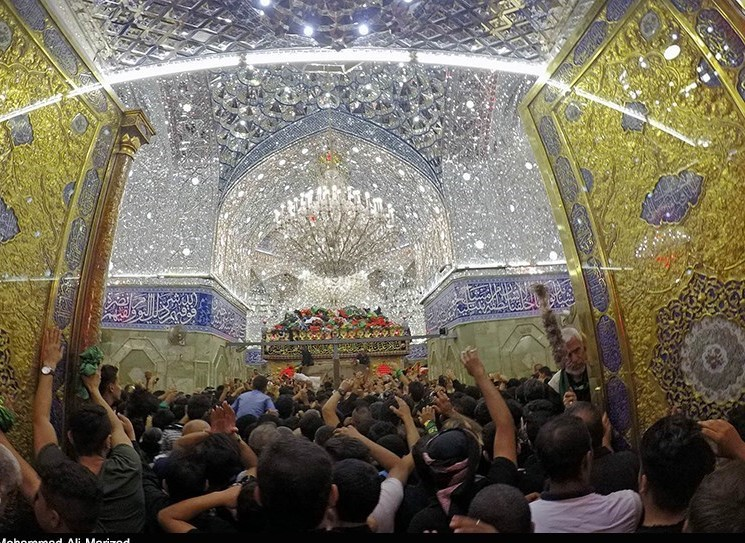

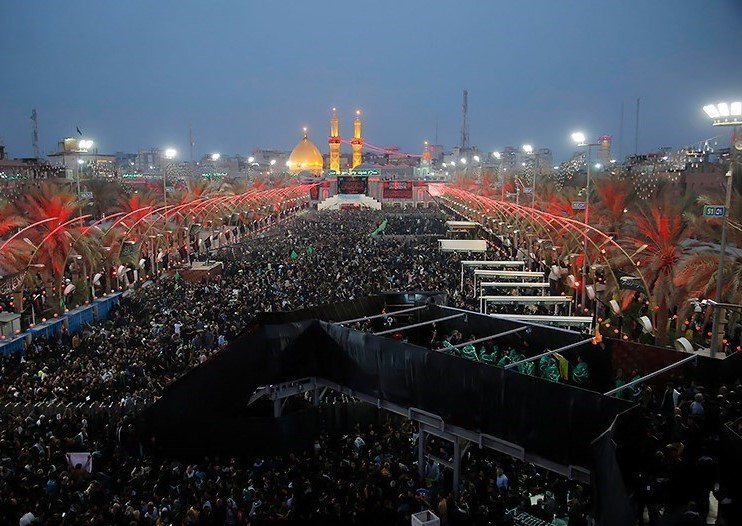

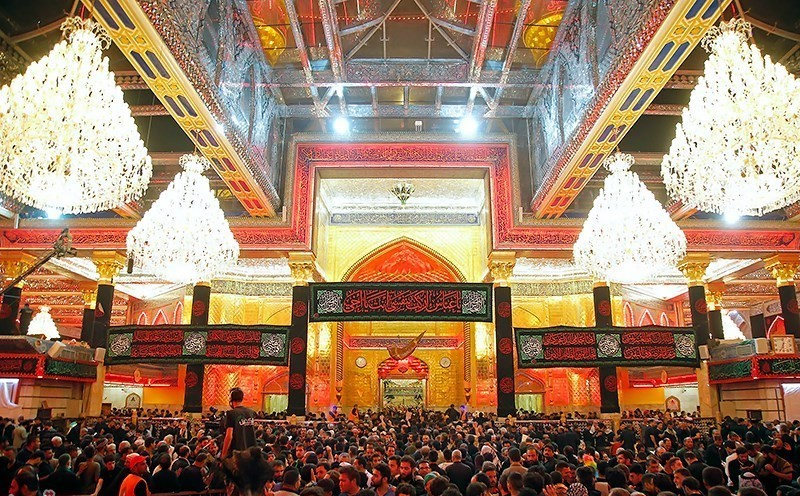

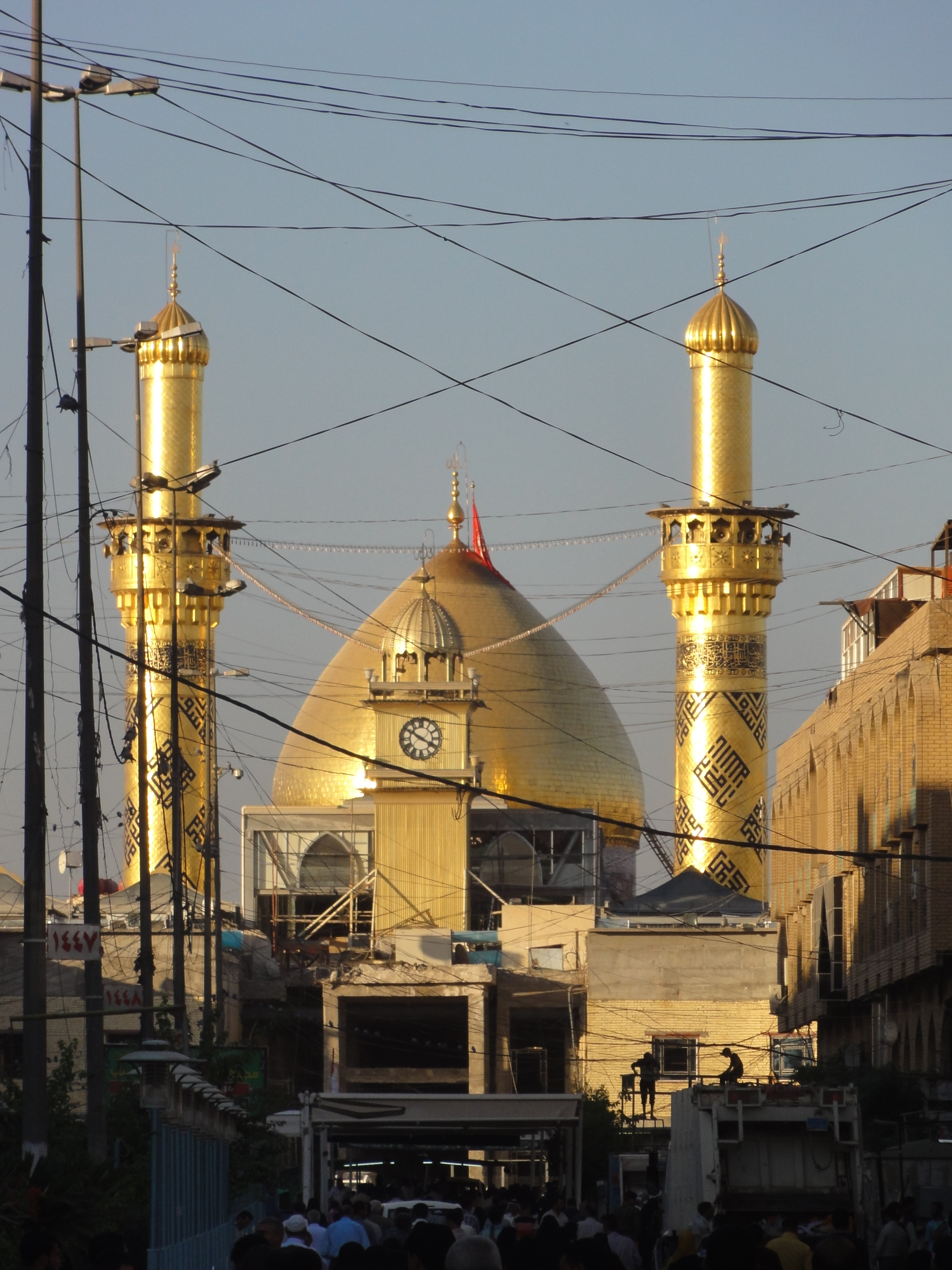

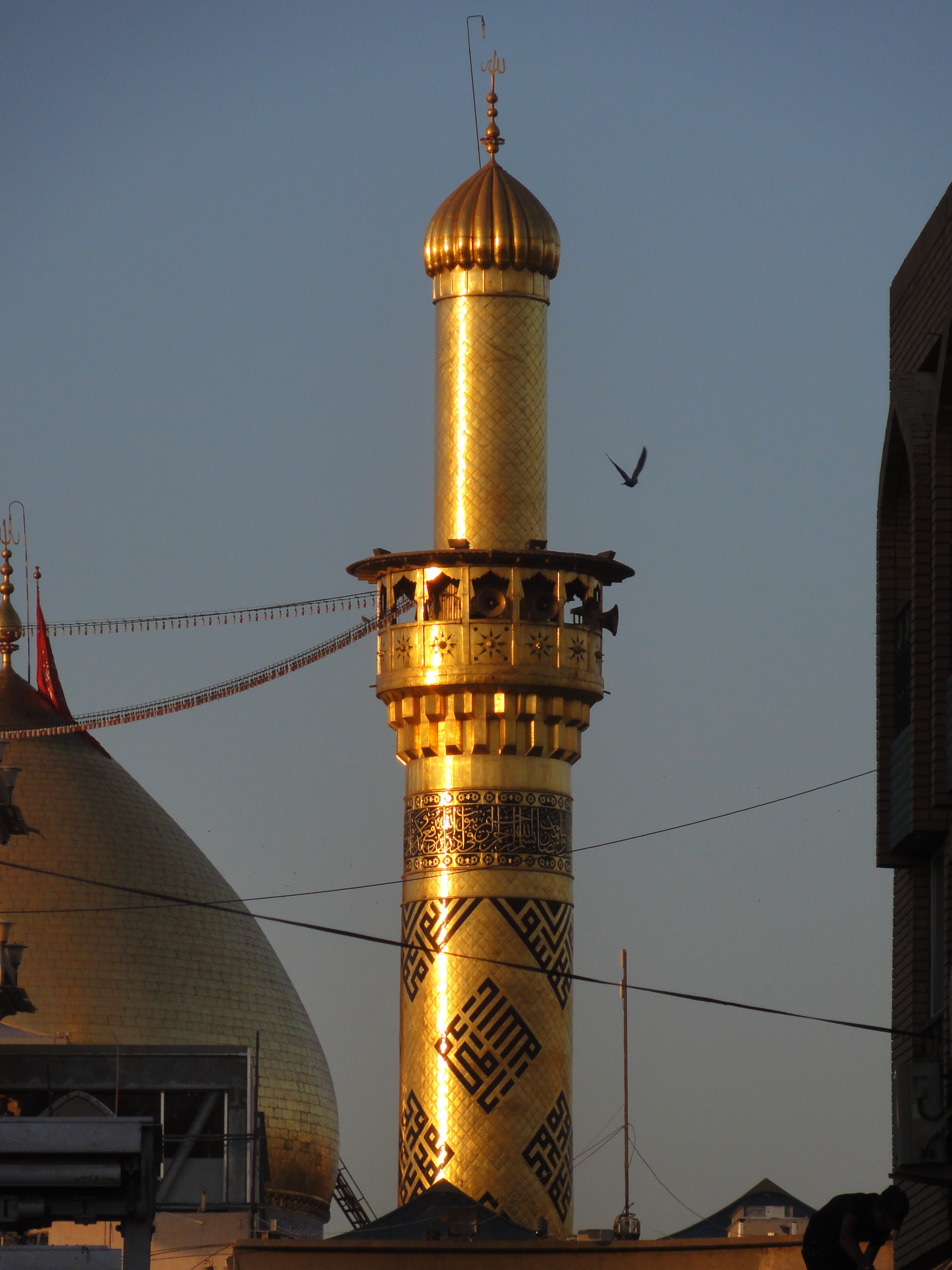

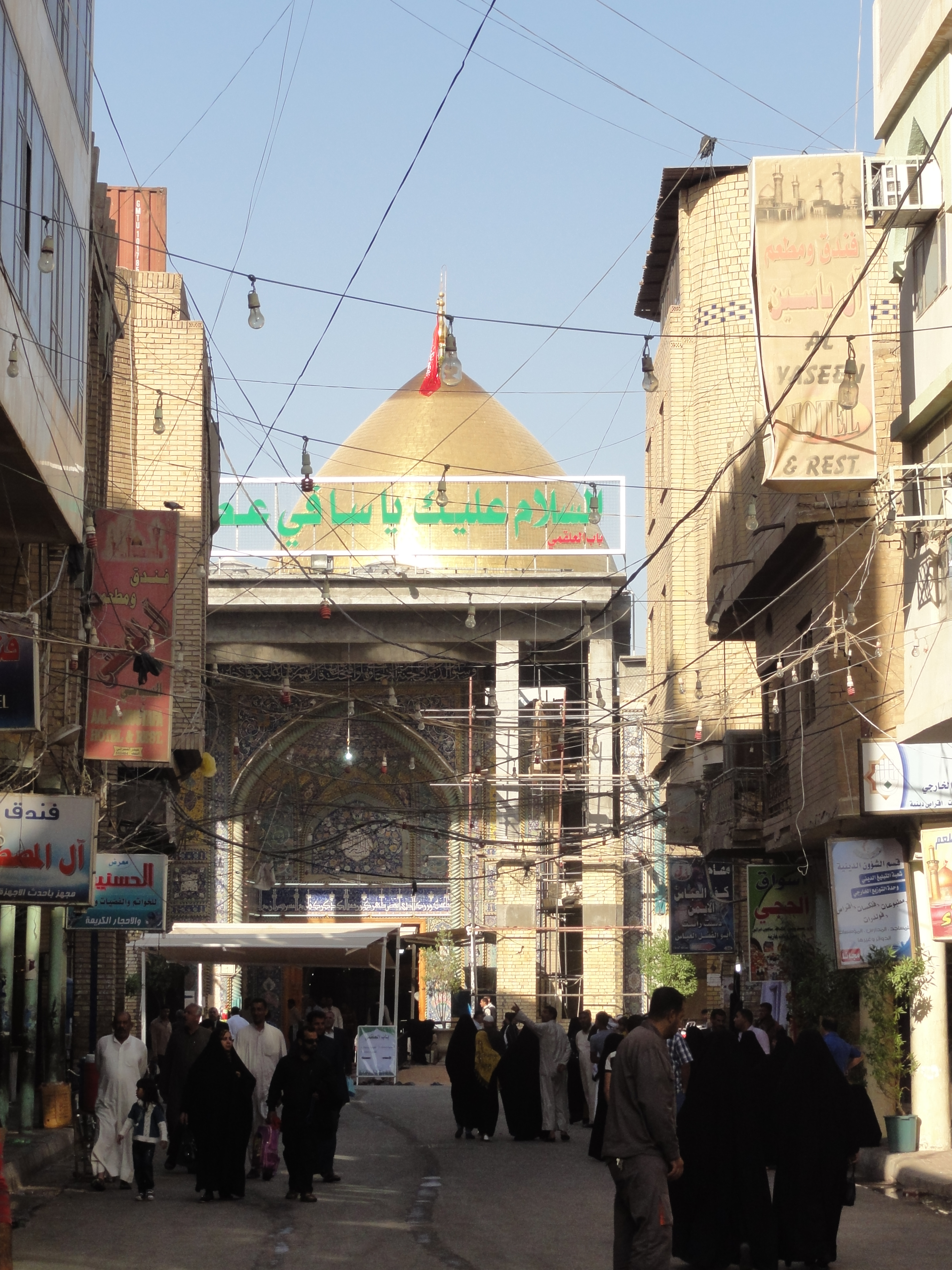

== See also ==
- Shia Islam in Iraq
- Holiest sites in Islam (Shia)
- List of mosques in Iraq
- List of the oldest mosques in the world
