= Wahhabi sack of Karbala =

1802 sack of a city

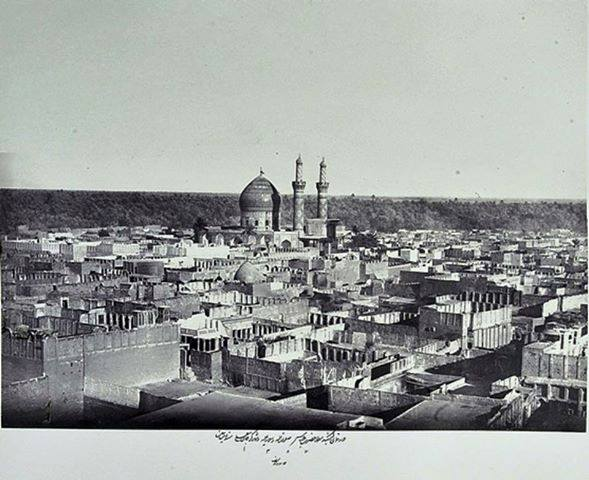
- The shrine of Husayn ibn Ali, Karbala in 1889

- Wahhabi sack of Karbala (Iraq)
- Location: Karbala, Iraq, Ottoman Empire
- Date: April 21, 1802 (or 1801)
- Target: Shrine of Husayn ibn Ali
- Attack type: Land army attack
- Deaths: 2,000–5,000
- Victim: Shia inhabitants of Karbala
- Perpetrator: Emirate of Diriyah
- Assailant: Wahhabis of Najd led by Saud bin Abdulaziz
- No. of participants: 12,000 soldiers

The Wahhabi sack of Karbala (Arabic: الهجوم الوهابي على كربلاء) occurred on 21 April 1802, under the rule of Abdulaziz bin Muhammad Al Saud, the second ruler of the Emirate of Diriyah, where approximately 12,000 Wahhabis from Najd attacked the Shia city of Karbala in Ottoman Iraq. The raid was conducted in retaliation against attacks on Hajj caravans by Iraqi tribes and coincided with the anniversary of Ghadir Khumm.

The Wahhabis killed between 2,000and 5,000 of the inhabitants and plundered the tomb of Husayn ibn Ali, grandson of the Islamic prophet Muhammad and son of Ali ibn Abi Talib, and destroyed its dome, seizing a large quantity of spoils, including gold, Persian carpets, money, pearls, and guns that had accumulated in the tomb, most of them donations. The attack lasted for eight hours, after which the Wahhabis left the city with more than 4,000 camels carrying their plunder.

== Background ==
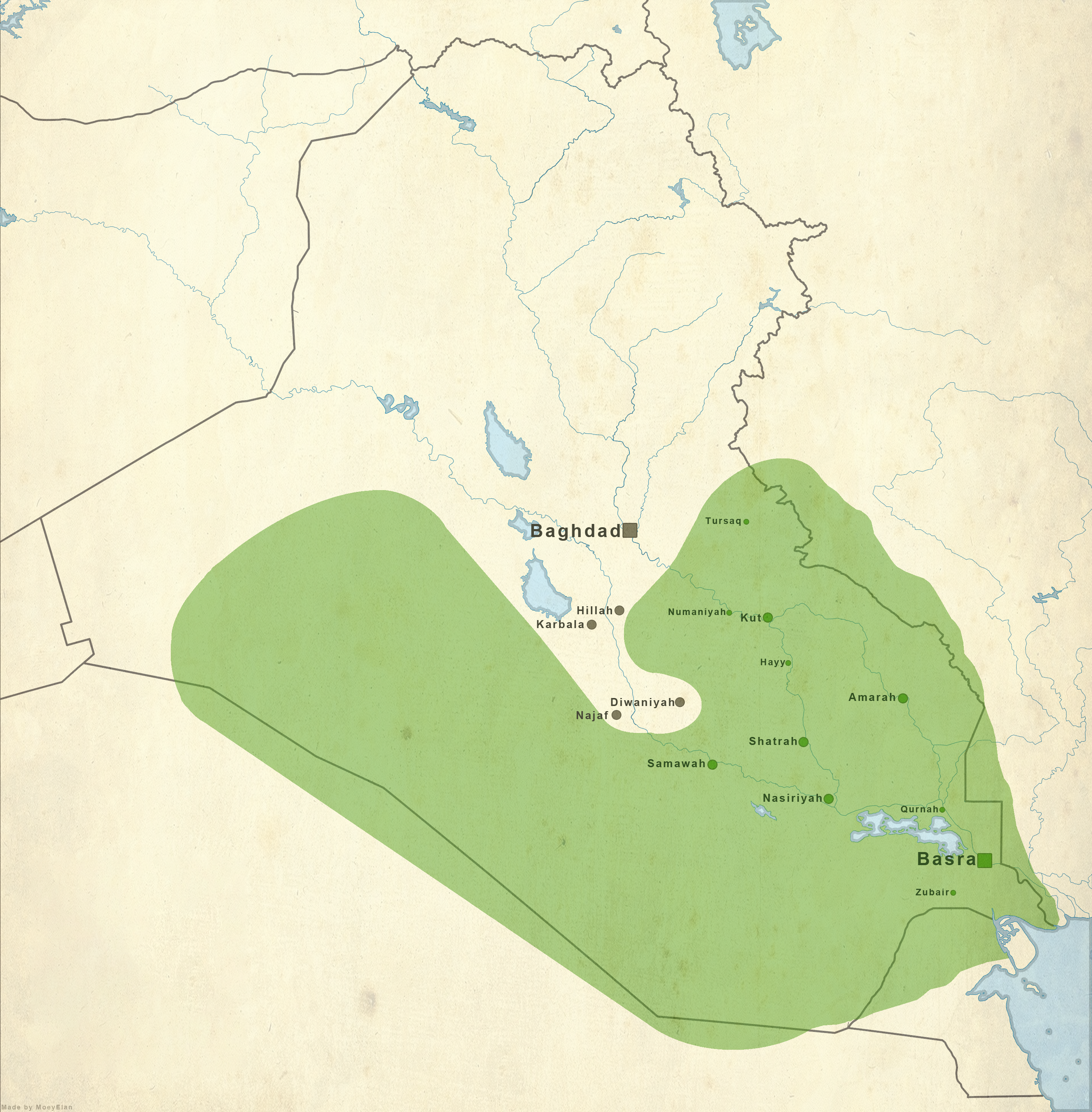
Al-Muntafiq Emirate, a union of Shiite clans based in the middle Euphrates region, was a major rival of the Emirate of Diriyah

Following the teachings of Ibn Taymiyya, the Wahhabis "sought to return to the fundamentals of the tradition – the Quran, and the Sunnah, and the Hanbali school's legal positions." They condemned some of the Shia practices such as veneration of the graves of their holy figures and Imams, which they regarded as shirk akbar, and did not limit themselves to academic confrontation. According to the French orientalist Jean-Baptiste Rousseau, it was also very well known that some of the Shia shrines of Karbala were repositories of "incredible wealth", accumulated over centuries.

The Turkish Deputy of Mecca had concluded an agreement with the Emirate of Diriyah which ensured the safety of Hajj pilgrims. Despite a temporary peace agreement between the Ottoman authorities and the Emirate of Diriyah, tensions escalated after tribal attacks on a Saudi-led caravan near Hail in 1801. The attacks were committed by Iraqi Sunni bedouin tribes, likely for financial gain, there is no direct evidence that the Mamluk governor of Baghdad, Suleyman Pasha, ordered or endorsed the raid.

The attack on the Saudi-led caravan was interpreted by the Emirate of Diriyah as a violation of the peace accord and a hostile provocation. In response, and consistent with their growing ideological opposition to Shi‘ism, Wahhabi forces under Saud bin Abdulaziz launched a major military expedition into Ottoman Iraq, culminating in the assault on Karbala in April 1802.

== Event ==
=== Date of attack ===
Most European and Russian orientalists date the attack to March 1801, based on works by Rousseau, Corancez, Burckhardt, and Mengin. Arab historians and St John Philby date the fall of Karbala to March – April 1802, based on Ibn Bishr's report of the event. The reports dating the attack to 1802, written soon after the attack, are accepted by Ibn Sanad and Raymond. Alexei Vassiliev argues that 1802 is correct, pointing out that the "dispatch" sent from Karbala reached the Russian embassy in Istanbul no later than 1803, and as Rousseau's book describing the attack is almost identical in wording with the text of the dispatch with the exception of accounted dates, the error could be due simply to "negligence" by the author, Rousseau, or the compositor.

=== Attack ===
On 18 Dhu al-Hijjah, coincident with the anniversary of Ghadir Khum, Wahhabis of the Najd led by Abdulaziz bin Muhammad's son, Saud, attacked Karbala. The Ottoman garrison escaped, and the Wahhabis were left free to loot the city and the shrine and kill 2,000–5,000 people.

Describing the event as "a horrible example of Wahhabis' cruel fanaticism in the terrible fate of [mosque of] Imam Husayn," Rousseau, who was residing in Iraq at the time, wrote that an incredible amount of wealth, including donations of silver, gold, and jewels to Husayn ibn Ali's shrine and those brought by Nadir Shah from his India campaign, was known to have been gathered in the city of Karbala. According to Rousseau, 12,000 Wahhabis attacked the city, set fire to everything, and killed old people, women, and children. "... when ever they saw a pregnant woman, they disembowelled her and left the foetus on the mother's bleeding corpse," said Rousseau.

According to a Wahhabi chronicler, Uthman ibn Abdullah ibn Bishr:

The Muslims scaled the walls, entered the city ... and killed the majority of its people in the markets and in their homes. [They] destroyed the dome placed over the grave of Husayn ibn Ali [and took] whatever they found inside the dome and its surroundings ... the grille surrounding the tomb which was encrusted with emeralds, rubies, and other jewels ... different types of property, weapons, clothing, carpets, gold, silver, precious copies of the Qur'an."

Wahhabis such as Ibn Bishr referred to themselves simply as 'Muslims', since they believed that they were the true Muslims.

The leader of the attack, Saud bin Abdulaziz bin Muhammad bin Saud, has been known as the 'butcher of Karbala' since then. The plunder of Karbala took the Wahhabis almost eight hours, according to Mengin. Fath-Ali Shah of Iran offered military help, which was rejected by the Ottomans, and instead he sent "500 Baluchi families to settle in Karbala and defend it."

== Aftermath ==
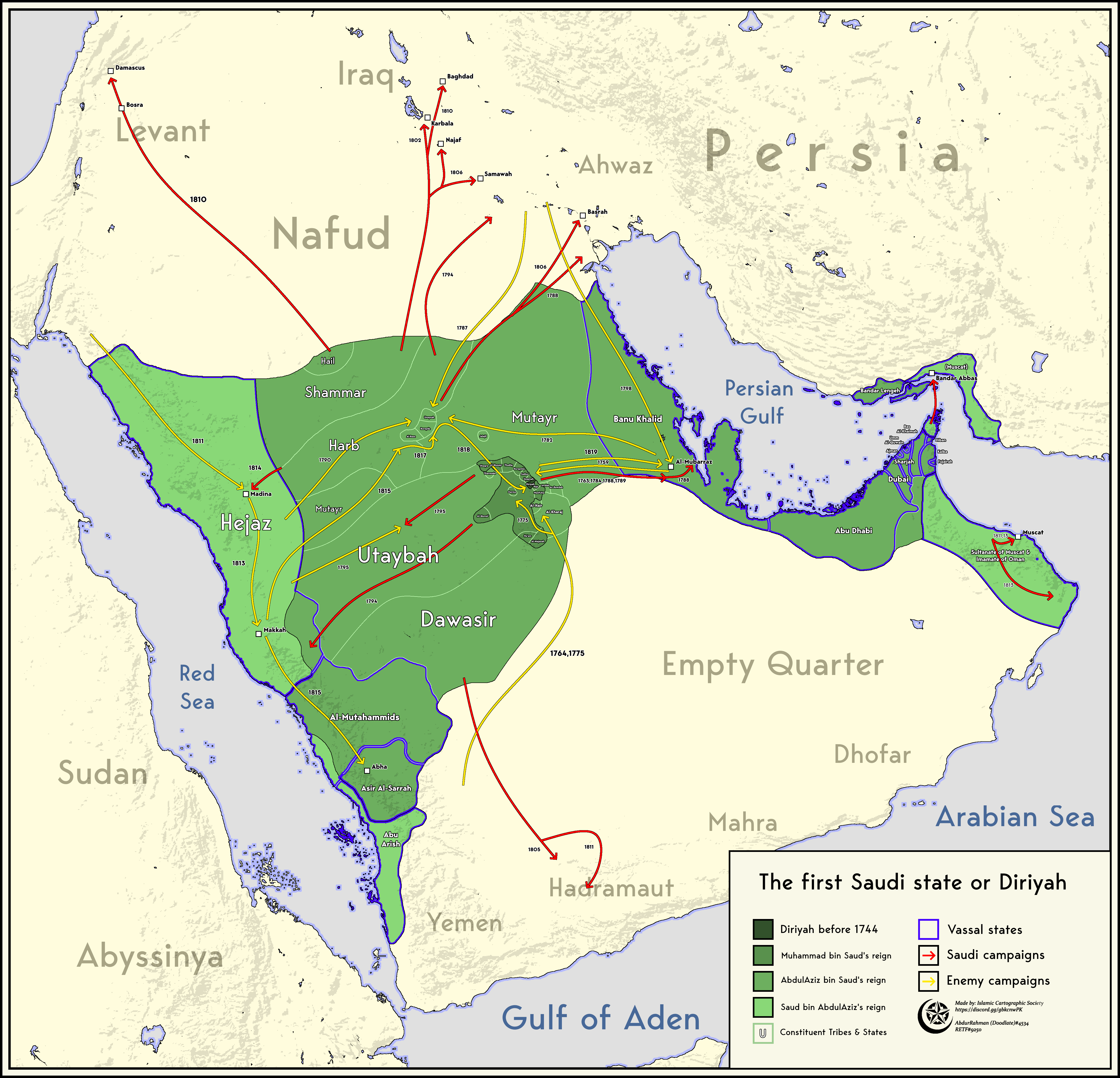
Expansion of the Emirate of Diriyah from 1744 to 1814

The fall of Karbala was counted as a defeat for Buyuk Sulayman Pasha, creating an opportunity for the Ottoman sultan to "dismiss him", especially because his situation was further weakened after he was criticized by the Shah of Persia, Fath Ali Shah, for his inability to confront the Wahhabis.

The attack exposed the lack of a Shia "army" to mobilize against such attacks. It also led to a strengthening of the "sectarian identity" of Shia ulama. The sack horrified the "Sunni scholarly establishment", but its aftermath also gave fundamentalism a degree of intellectual credibility in the Sunni literary salons of Baghdad, further heightening sectarian tensions. Saudi ruler Abd al-Azeez would soon be assassinated by a Shia in a revenge attack. Following 'Abd al-Azeez's death, further Wahhabi advances within Iraq were halted and Iraqi Shia counter offensives into Saudi territory began.

== See also ==
- Demolition of al-Baqi
- Emirate of Nejd
- List of wars involving Saudi Arabia
- Wahhabi War
- Wahhabi raids on Najaf
- Siege of Karbala 1843
