= Karbala =

City in Karbala Governorate, Iraq

Karbala كَرْبَلَاء
- Metropolis
- Mayoralty of Karbala
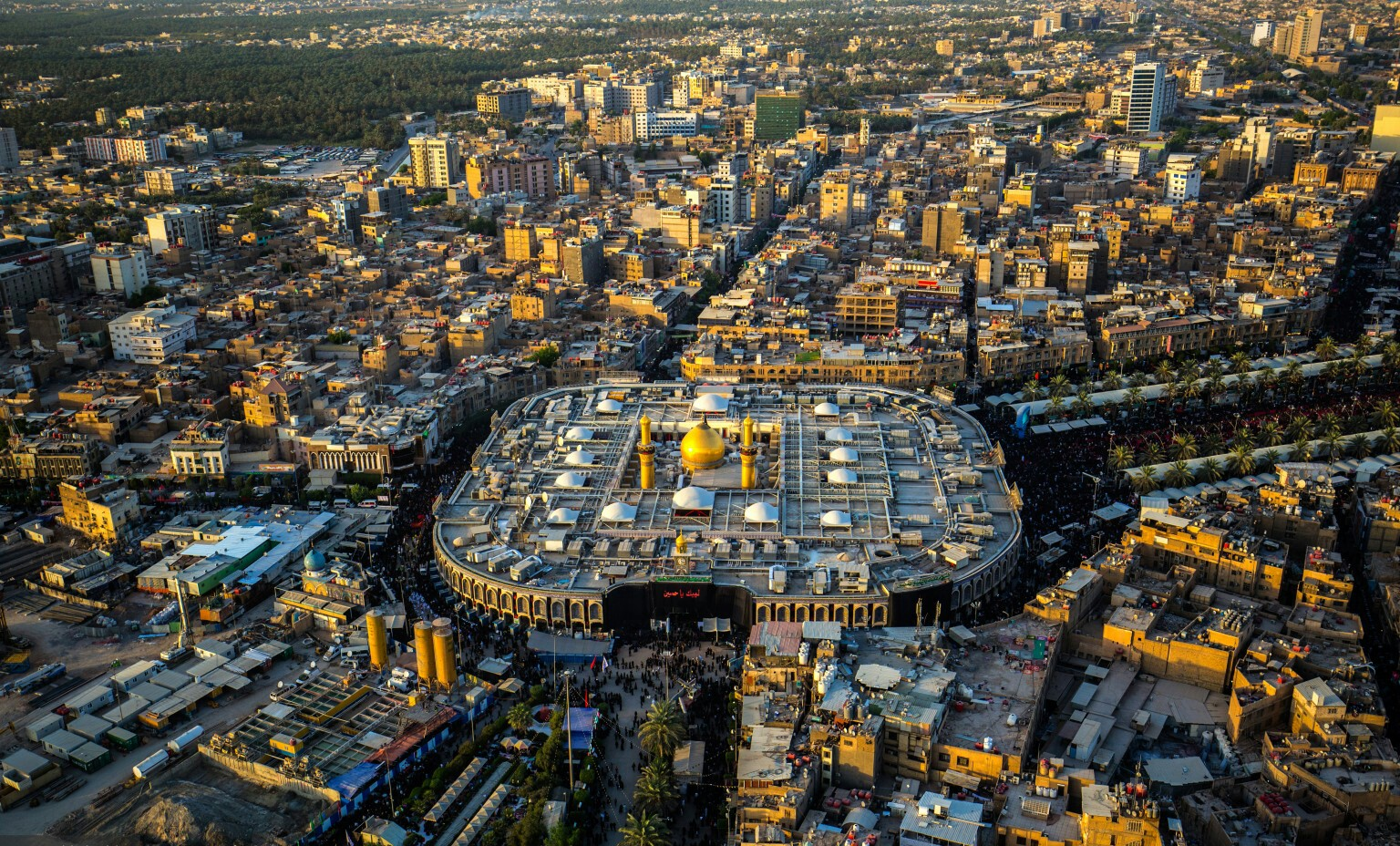
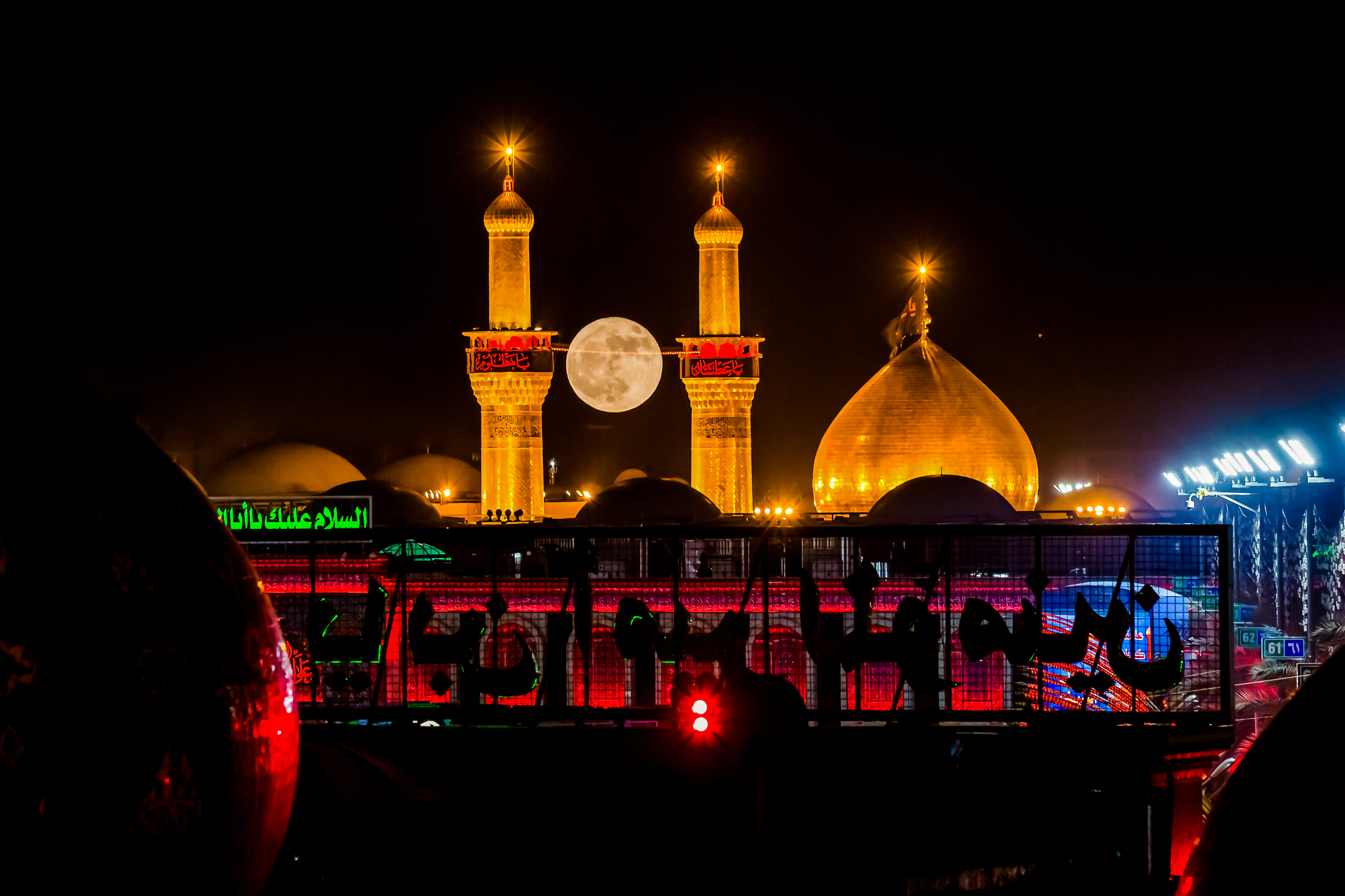
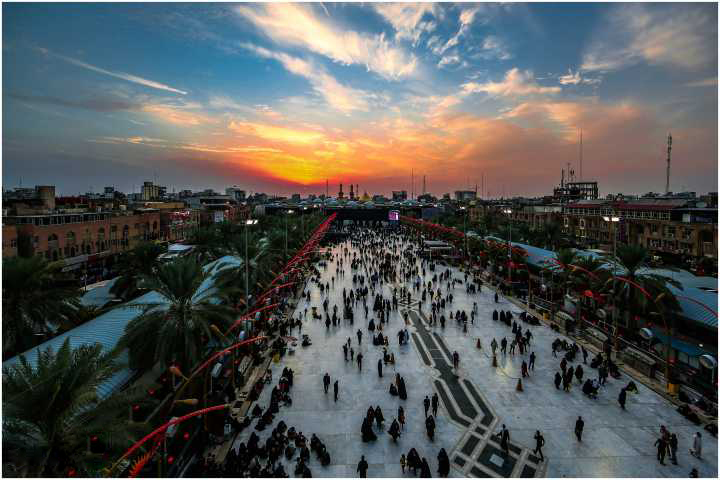
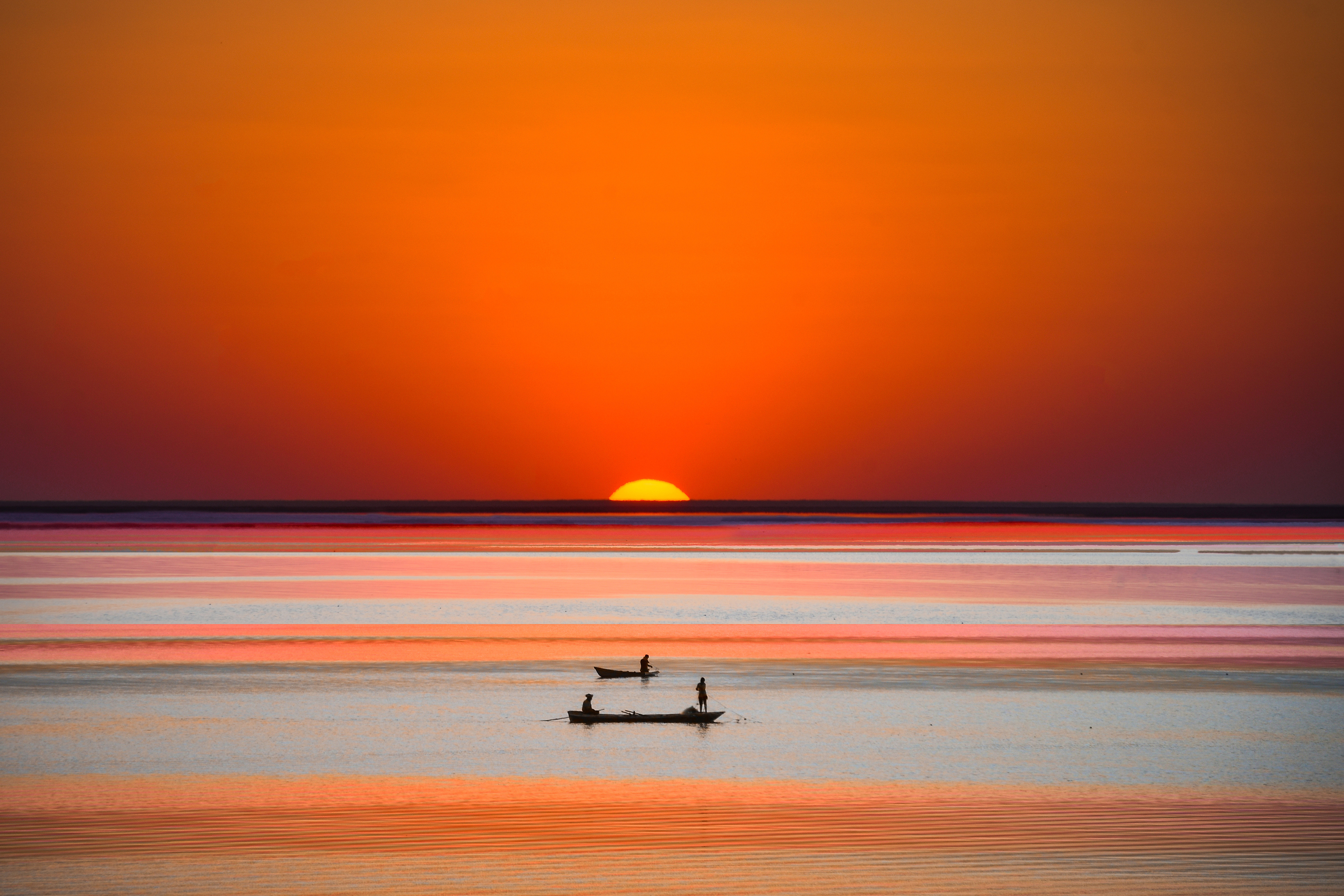
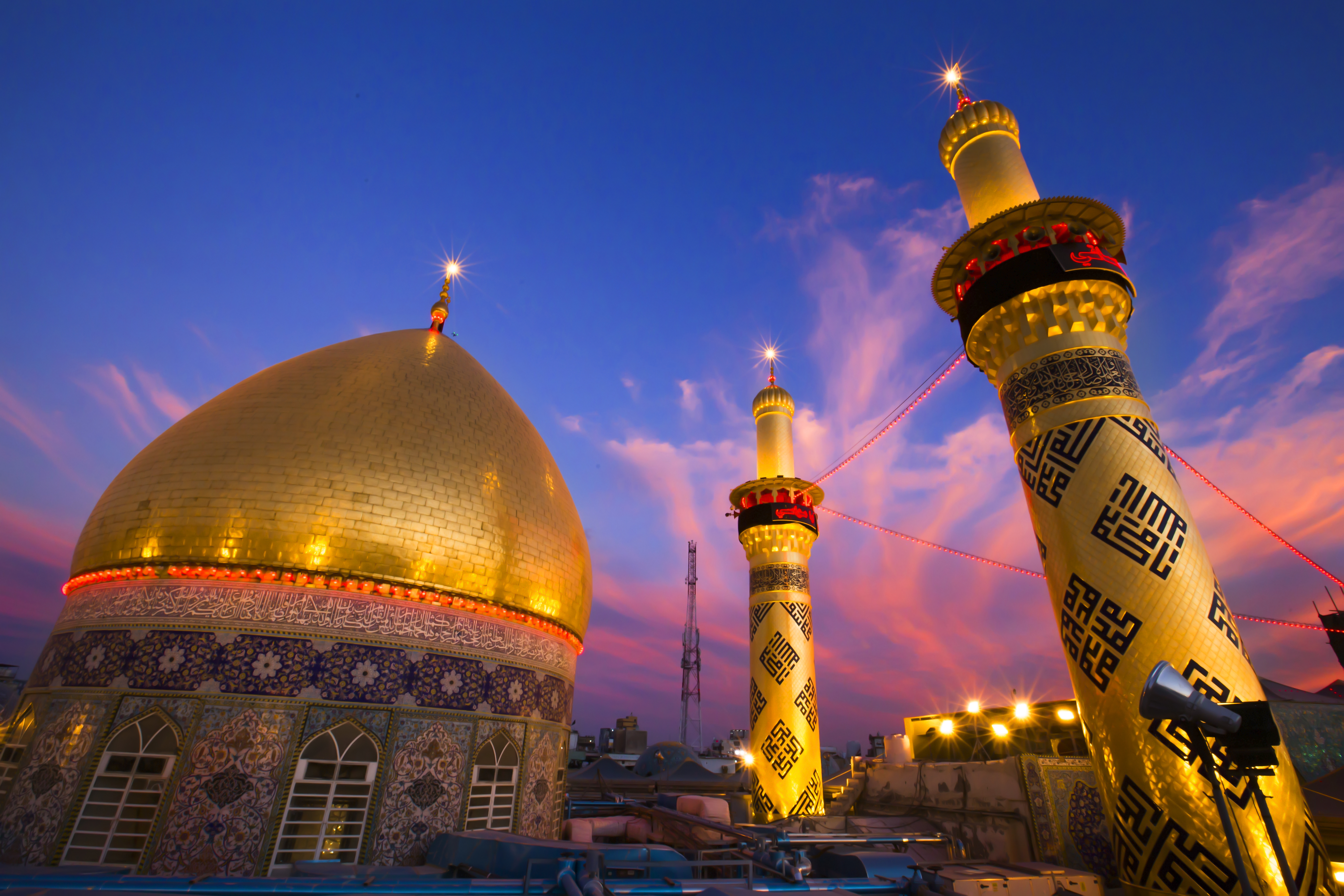
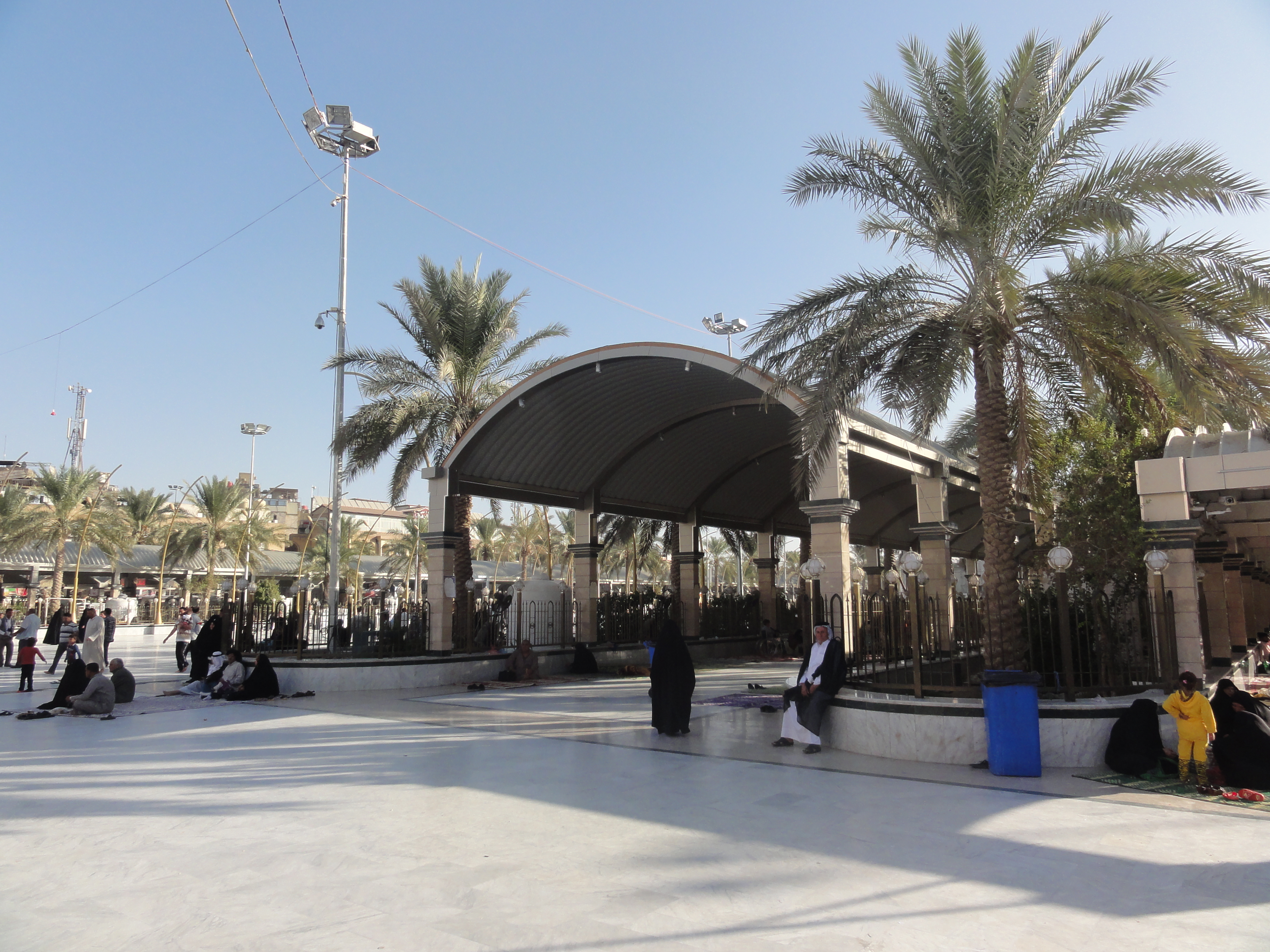
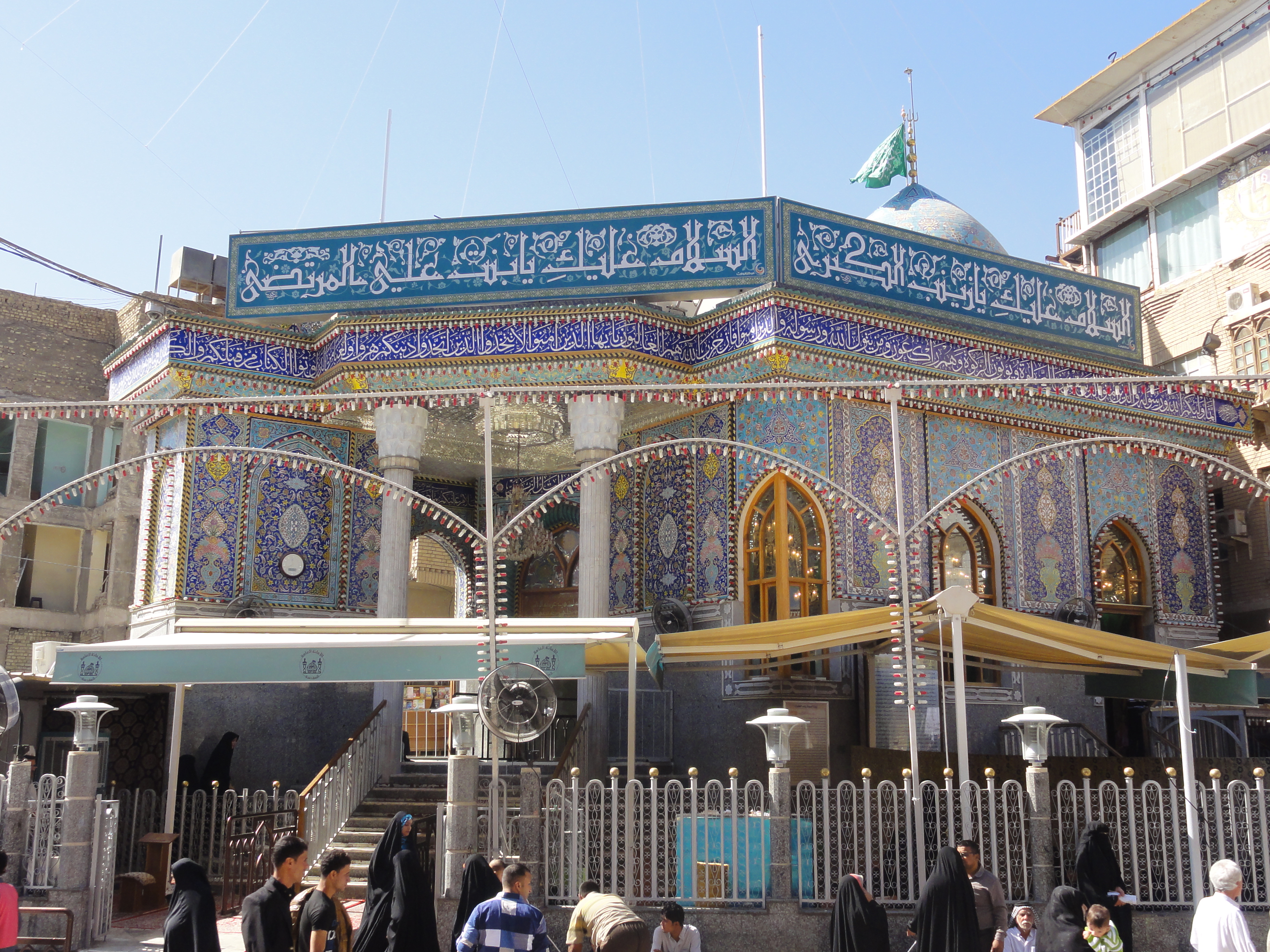
- From top to bottom, left to right: View of Karbala, Holy Shrine Of Abu Fadhl Al-Abbas, Holy Shrine Of Imam Al-Hussein, Al-Khudair Fortress, Imam Hussein Camp, Karbala Orchids and Al-Tar Caves 2
- Interactive map of Karbala
- Location of Karbala within Iraq Karbala (Asia)
- Coordinates: 32°37′N 44°02′E
- Country: Iraq
- Governorate: Karbala
- Settled: 690 CE

Government
  - Type: Mayor–council

Area
  - Total: 42.4 km^{2} (16.4 sq mi)
- Elevation: 28 m (92 ft)

Population (2024 census)
  - Total: 784,219
  - Rank: 8th in Iraq
  - Density: 18,496/km^{2} (47,900/sq mi)
- Demonym: Karbalaei
- Time zone: UTC+3 (Arabian Standard Time)
  - Summer (DST): UTC+3 (No DST)
- Postal code: 10001 to 10090

Karbala (Note: (/ˈkɑːrbələ/ KAR-bə-lə, US also /ˌkɑːrbəˈlɑː/ KAR-bə-LAH; Arabic: كَرْبَلَاء, romanized: Karbalāʾ, IPA: [karbaˈlaːʔ]); due to its status as a holy city in Shia Islam, the city is also referred to with the honorific name Karbala al-Muqaddasah (Arabic: كربلاء المقدسة, lit. 'The Holy Karbala')) is a major city in Iraq, and the capital of Karbala Governorate. With a population of around 800,000 people in 2024, Karbala is the second-largest city in central Iraq, after Baghdad. The city is located a few miles east of Lake Milh, also known as Razzaza Lake. With presence of the Imam Husayn and Al-Abbas Shrines, Karbala is a profoundly holy city in Shia Islam. It is one of the main political, spiritual, and cultural hubs of Shia Islam.

The city was the location of the Battle of Karbala, where Husayn, grandson of the Islamic prophet Muhammad and the third Shia Imam, was massacred alongside most of his family by the forces of the Umayyad caliph Yazid in 680 CE. Karbala went on to become an important center of pilgrimage. After the Siege of Baghdad in 1258, Karbala came under the control of the Mongol Empire led by Hulegu Khan. The city continued to be under multiple successive empires.

Karbala enjoyed the status of semi-autonomy after the First Saudi State invasion. In 1843, Karbala was besieged by Ottoman troops. In 1915, Karbala was site of an uprising, which drove the Ottomans out of the city. Millions of Shia Muslism visit the city twice a year. The martyrdom of Husayn and Abbas is commemorated annually by over 20 million Muslims inside the city. Up to 34 million pilgrims visit the city to observe Ashura (the tenth day of Muharram), which marks the anniversary of Husayn's martyrdom. However, the main event is the Arba'in pilgrimage (the 40th day after Ashura), where up to 40 million visit the graves, the largest annual public gathering on earth. Most of the pilgrims travel on foot and come from all around Iraq and nearly 60 countries.

== Etymology ==
There are many opinions among different investigators, as to the origin of the word Karbala. Some have pointed out that Karbala has a connection to the "Karbalato" language, while others attempt to derive the meaning of word by analyzing its spelling and language. They conclude that it originates from the "Kar Babel" group of ancient Babylonian villages that included Nainawa, Al-Ghadiriyya, Karbella (or Karb Illu), Al-Nawaweess, and Al-Heer. This last name is today known as Al-Hair and is where Husayn ibn Ali's grave is located.

The investigator Yaqut al-Hamawi had pointed out that the meaning of Karbala could have several explanations, one of which is that the place where Husayn ibn Ali was martyred is made of soft earth—al-Karbalāt.

Another theory suggests that this word originates from the Assyrian language and is a combination of two terms: "karb" (meaning proximity or sanctuary / cherub and cherubim) and "ila" (meaning God), thus signifying "sanctuary of God" or "house of God." According to another theory, the word means "great karb," and the element "la" in it should be compared to the ancient "La\Lu" component found in Mesopotamian words (such as the word "Lugal"). In Shi'a Islamic tradition, there are also two hadiths from Ali ibn Abi Talib and the Prophet of Islam that establish a connection between Karbala and the concepts of "karb" (distress) and "bala" (affliction) in the first narration, as well as the event of Noah's flood—which is referred to in the Quran as "great karb"—in the second narration.

According to Shia's belief, the archangel Gabriel narrated the true meaning of the name Karbala to Muhammad: a combination of karb (Arabic: كَرْب, "the land which will cause many agonies") and balāʾ (Arabic: بَلاء, "afflictions").

== History ==
=== Religious significance ===
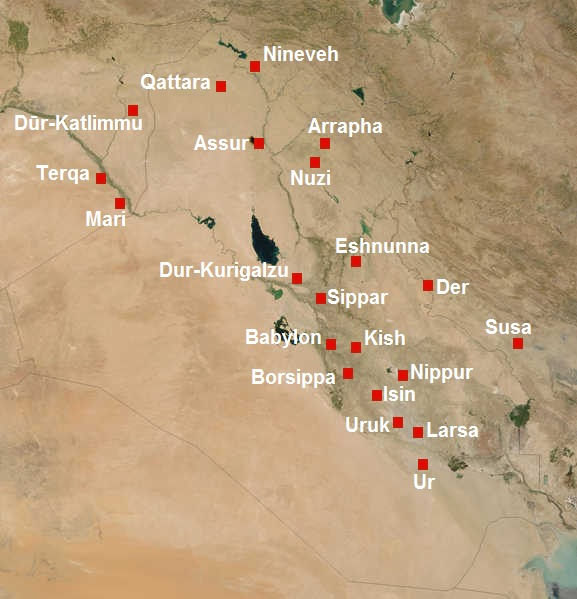
A The map of Mesopotamia in the 3rd millennium BCE, showing Nineveh (the township of Yunus)), Qattara (or Karana), Dūr-Katlimmu, Assur, Arrapḫa, Terqa, Nuzi, Mari, Eshnunna, Dur-Kurigalzu, Der, Sippar, Babylon, Kish, Susa, Borsippa, Nippur, Isin, Uruk, Larsa and Ur, from north to south. Note the relative proximity of Babylon and Sippar to Lake Milh, which is near Karbala.

Mesopotamia has been mentioned in the Quran. Some Shi'ites consider this verse of the Quran to refer to Iraq, the land of the Shi'ite sacred sites of Kufah, Najaf, Karbala, Kadhimiyyah (Note: Kadhimyyah used to be a township of its own, but is now a part of the city of Baghdad.) and Samarra, since the Monotheistic preachers Ibrāhīm (Abraham) and Lūṭ (Lot), who are regarded as Prophets in Islam, are believed to have lived in the ancient Iraqi city of Kutha Rabba, before going to "The Blessed Land".

Then We delivered him (Ibrahim), along with Lot, to the land We had showered with blessings for all people.

— Quran 21:71

Aside from the story of Abraham and Lot in Polytheistic Mesopotamia, there are passages in the Quran about Mount Judi, Babil ("Babylon") and Qaryat Yunus ("Town of Jonah").

The tomb of the martyred Imam has acquired great significance in Shia tradition because he and his fellow martyrs are seen as models of jihad in the way of God. Shi'ites believe that Karbala is one of the holiest places on Earth according to the following traditions (among others):

The angel Gabriel narrated to Muhammad that:

Karbala, where your grandson and his family will be martyred, is one of the most blessed and the most sacred lands on Earth, and it is one of the valleys of Paradise.

Zayn al-Abidin, the fourth Shi'ite Imam, narrated:

God chose the land of Karbalā' as a safe and blessed sanctuary twenty-four thousand years before He created the land of the Ka'bah and chose it as a sanctuary. Verily it (Karbala) will shine among the gardens of Paradise like a shining star shines among the stars for the people of Earth.

In this regard, Ja'far al-Sadiq narrates, 'Allah, the Almighty, has made the dust of my ancestor's grave – Imam Husain (a.s) as a cure for every sickness and safety from every fear.' It is narrated from Ja'far that: "The earth of the pure and holy grave of Husayn ibn ‘Ali (a.s) is a pure and blessed musk. For those who consume it, it is a cure for every ailment, and if our enemy uses it then he will melt the way fat melts, when you intend to consume that pure earth recite the following supplication"

=== Battle of Karbala ===
The Battle of Karbala was fought on the bare deserts on the way to Kufa on October 10, 680 AD (10 Muharram 61 AH). Both Husayn ibn Ali and his brother Abbas ibn Ali were buried by the local Banī Asad tribe, at what later became known as the Mashhad Al-Husayn. The battle itself occurred as a result of Husain's refusal of Yazid's demand for allegiance to his caliphate. The Kufan governor, Ubaydallah ibn Ziyad, sent thirty thousand horsemen against Husayn as he traveled to Kufa. Husayn had no army, he was with his family and few friends who joined them, so there were around 73 men, including the 6-month-old Ali Asghar, son of Imam Husayn, in total. The horsemen, under 'Umar ibn Sa'd, were ordered to deny Husayn and his followers water to force Husayn to agree to give an oath of allegiance. On the 9th of Muharram, Husayn refused, and requested to be given the night to pray. On the 10th day of Muharram, Husayn ibn Ali prayed the morning prayer and led his troops into battle along with his brother Abbas. Many of Husayn's followers, including all of his present sons Ali Akbar, Ali Asghar (six months old) and his nephews Qassim, Aun and Muhammad were killed.

In 63 AH (683 AD), Yazid ibn Mu'awiya released the surviving members of Husayn's family from prison as there was a threat of uprisings and some of the people in his court were unaware of who the battle was with, when they got to know that the descendants of Muhammad were killed, they were horrified. On their way to Mecca, they stopped at the site of the battle. There is a record of Sulayman ibn Surad going on pilgrimage to the site as early as 65 AH (685 AD). The city began as a tomb and shrine to Husayn ibn Ali, grandson of Muhammad and son of Ali ibn Abi Talib, and grew as a city to meet the needs of pilgrims. The city and tombs were greatly expanded by successive Muslim rulers, but suffered repeated destruction from attacking armies. The original shrine was destroyed by the Abbasid Caliph Al-Mutawakkil in 850 but was rebuilt in its present form around 979, only to be partly destroyed by fire in 1086 and rebuilt yet again.

=== Early modern ===
During the period of Ottoman Iraq, Karbala, like Najaf, suffered from severe water shortages that were only resolved in the early 18th century by building a dam at the head of the Husayniyya Canal. In 1737, the city replaced Isfahan in Iran as the main center of Shia scholarship. In the mid-eighteenth century it was dominated by the dean of scholarship, Yusuf Al Bahrani, a key proponent of the Akhbari tradition of Shia thought, until he died in 1772, after which the more state-centric Usuli school became more influential.

The Wahhabi sack of Karbala occurred on 21 April 1802 (1216 Hijri) (1801), under the rule of Abdul-Aziz bin Muhammad the second ruler of the First Saudi State, when 12,000 Wahhabi Muslims from Najd attacked the city of Karbala. The attack was coincident with the anniversary of Ghadir Khum event, or 10 Muharram. This fight left 3,000–5,000 deaths and the dome of the tomb of Husayn ibn Ali, was destroyed. The fight lasted for 8 hours.

After the First Saudi State invasion, the city enjoyed semi-autonomy during Ottoman rule, governed by a group of gangs and mafia variously allied with members of the 'ulama. In order to reassert their authority, the Ottoman army laid siege to the city. On January 13, 1843, Ottoman troops entered the city. Many of the city leaders fled leaving defense of the city largely to tradespeople. About 3,000 Arabs were killed in the city, and another 2,000 outside the walls (this represented about 15% of the city's normal population). The Turks lost 400 men. This prompted many students and scholars to move to Najaf, which became the main Shia religious centre. Between 1850 and 1903, Karbala enjoyed a generous influx of money through the Oudh Bequest. The Shia-ruled Indian Province of Awadh, known by the British as Oudh, had always sent money and pilgrims to the holy city. The Oudh money, 10 million rupees, originated in 1825 from the Awadh Nawab Ghazi-ud-Din Haider. One third was to go to his wives, and the other two-thirds went to holy cities of Karbala and Najaf. When his wives died in 1850, the money piled up with interest in the hands of the British East India Company. The EIC sent the money to Karbala and Najaf per the wives' wishes, in the hopes of influencing the Ulama in Britain's favor. This effort to curry favor is generally considered to have been a failure.

=== Modern history ===
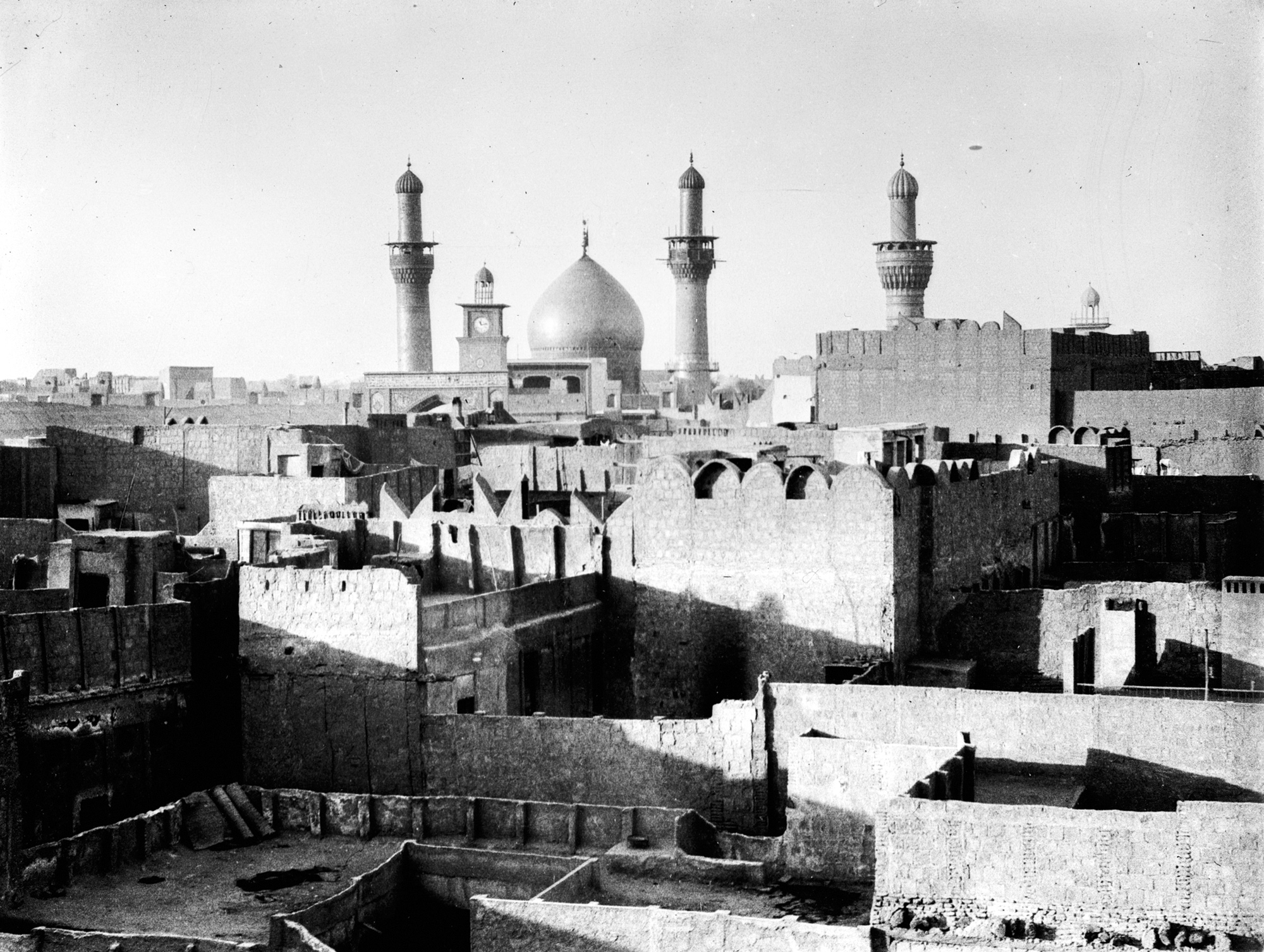
Mosque in Karbala (1932)

In 1915, Karbala was the scene of an uprising against the Ottoman Empire. In 1928, an important drainage project was carried out to relieve the city of unhealthy swamps, formed between Hussainiya and the Bani Hassan Canals on the Euphrates.

Defense of the City Hall in Karbala – a series of skirmishes fought from April 3 to April 6, 2004, between the Iraqi rebels of the Mahdi Army trying to conquer the city hall and the defending Polish and Bulgarian soldiers from the Multinational Division Central-South

In 2003 following the American invasion, the Karbala town council attempted to elect United States Marine Corps Lieutenant Colonel Matthew Lopez as mayor. Ostensibly so that his Marines, contractors, and funds could not leave.

On April 14, 2007, a car bomb exploded about 600 ft (180 m) from the shrine to Husayn, killing 47 and wounding over 150.

On January 19, 2008, 2 million Iraqi Shia pilgrims marched through Karbala city, Iraq to commemorate Ashura. 20,000 Iraqi troops and police guarded the event amid tensions due to clashes between Iraqi troops and Shia which left 263 people dead (in Basra and Nasiriya).

== Geography ==
With 3.9 million palm trees, Karbala produces approximately 160,000 tons of dates across 90 different varieties. Karbala has surpassed Saudi Arabia's Al-Ahsa Oasis, becoming the world's largest palm oasis. It is about 100 km (62 mi) from southwest of Baghdad

=== Climate ===
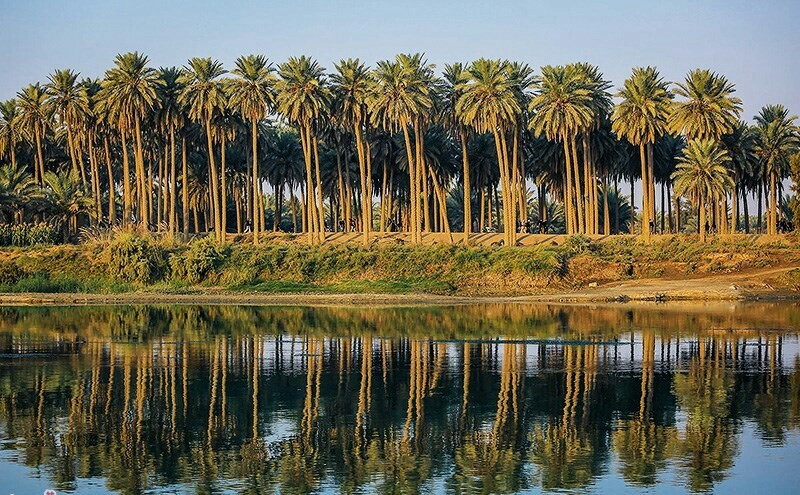
Palm trees in Karbala behind a lake

Karbala experiences a hot arid climate (BWh in the Köppen climate classification) with extremely hot, long, dry summers and mild winters. Almost all of the yearly rainfall is received between November and April, though no month is wet.

Climate data for Karbala (1991–2020)
Month	Jan	Feb	Mar	Apr	May	Jun	Jul	Aug	Sep	Oct	Nov	Dec	Year
Mean daily maximum °C (°F)	16.6 (61.9)	19.5 (67.1)	24.6 (76.3)	31.3 (88.3)	37.6 (99.7)	42.4 (108.3)	44.7 (112.5)	44.7 (112.5)	40.9 (105.6)	34.2 (93.6)	24.1 (75.4)	18.3 (64.9)	31.6 (88.8)
Daily mean °C (°F)	10.6 (51.1)	12.9 (55.2)	17.4 (63.3)	23.9 (75.0)	29.7 (85.5)	33.9 (93.0)	36.4 (97.5)	35.9 (96.6)	32.3 (90.1)	26.2 (79.2)	17.7 (63.9)	12.3 (54.1)	24.1 (75.4)
Mean daily minimum °C (°F)	6.0 (42.8)	8.0 (46.4)	12.1 (53.8)	17.9 (64.2)	23.5 (74.3)	27.6 (81.7)	29.8 (85.6)	29.3 (84.7)	25.6 (78.1)	20.1 (68.2)	12.1 (53.8)	7.4 (45.3)	18.3 (64.9)
Average rainfall mm (inches)	17.6 (0.69)	14.5 (0.57)	14.1 (0.56)	11.9 (0.47)	2.4 (0.09)	0.0 (0.0)	0.0 (0.0)	0.0 (0.0)	0.3 (0.01)	4.1 (0.16)	14.8 (0.58)	13.8 (0.54)	93.5 (3.67)
Average relative humidity (%)	72.1	60.7	49.8	42.5	34.1	28.2	28.6	30.2	34.9	44.7	61.5	70.5	46.5

== Economy ==
Karbala is a significant pilgrimage destination for Shia Muslims, especially during the Islamic holy month of Muharram. According to Azher Al-Kalash, Vice President of the Association of Hotels and Tourist Restaurants in Karbala, said, "Karbala has the highest number of hotels in Iraq, with 900 hotels of various levels, equivalent to one-third of the total number of hotels in the entire country. Some hotels have safety and security concerns raised by the civil defense, but the most comply with the regulations and instructions."

Tourism in every country is influenced by supply and demand. Hence, hotel and transportation prices rise during peak times. In Karbala, the minimum hotel rate is around $10 per night, while the maximum can reach $50 during Ashura. However, the amount doubles during the Arbaeen pilgrimage due to the high demand. Arbaeen is the most significant pilgrimage that hotel owners rely on throughout the year." Thus, tourism plays an important role in stimulating various sectors, whether hotels, agriculture, trade, or others. It contributes to the employment of all economic sectors of society.

Karbala Refinery, with a refining capacity of 140,000 barrels per day (bpd), it stands as Iraq's largest refining project in four decades. The refinery commenced commercial operations in mid-March 2024, initially operating at 60% capacity, with plans to reach full capacity by August 2024. It is estimated that the refinery produce 70% of country's petroleum products and generate $3bn in revenue.

== Culture ==
=== Religious tourism ===
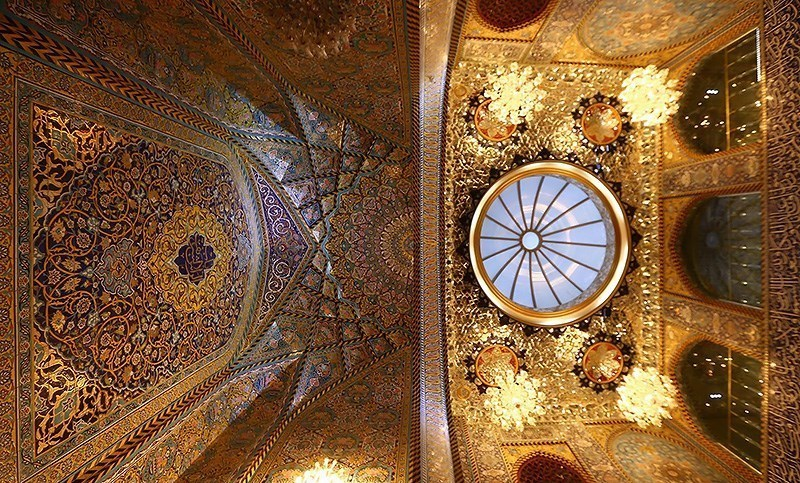
Shrine in Karbala, showing use of Arabesque

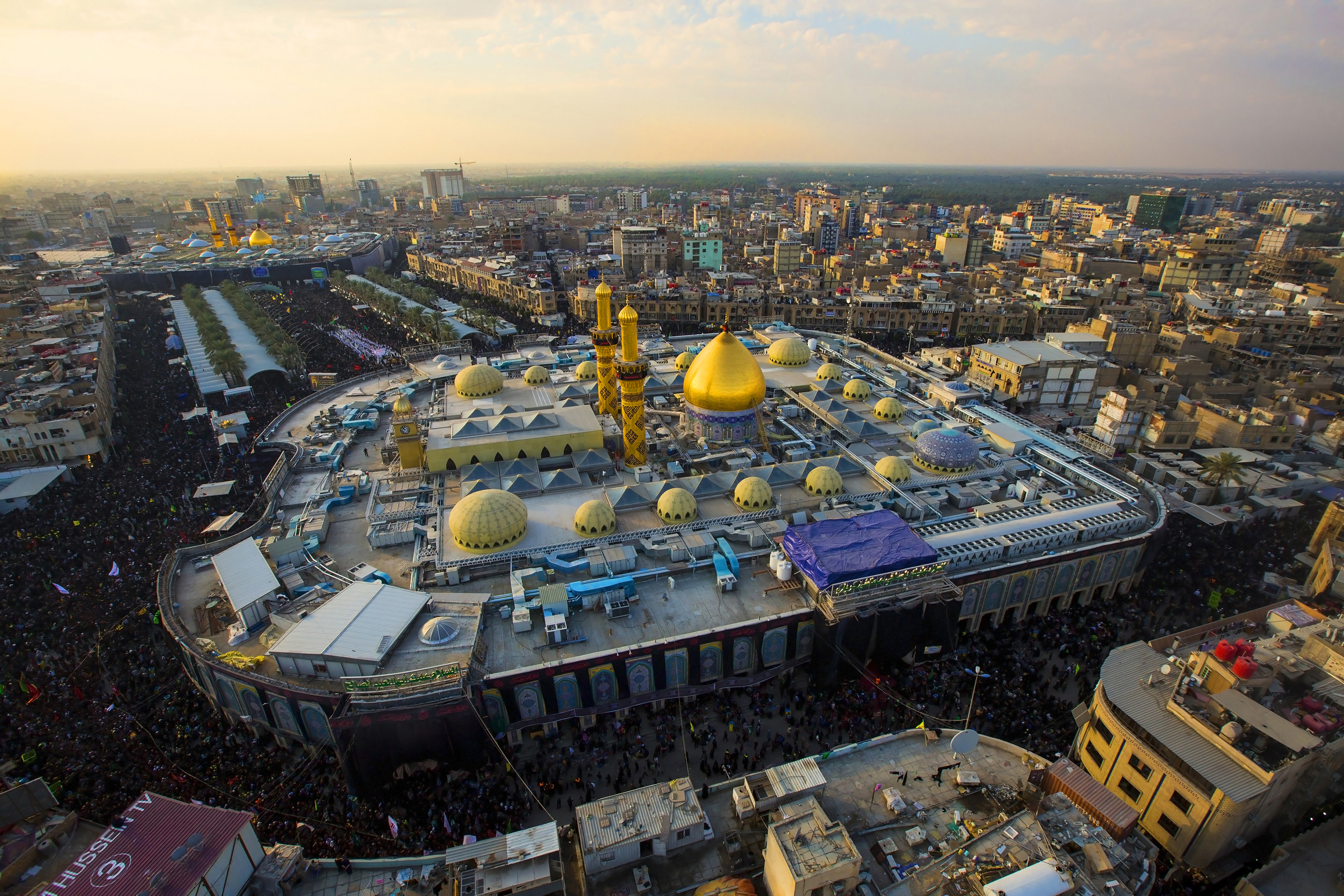
Al-Abbas Shrine

Karbala, alongside Najaf, is considered a thriving tourist destination for Shia Muslims and the tourism industry in the city boomed after the end of Saddam Hussein's rule. Some religious tourism attractions include:

- Al Abbas Mosque
- Imam Husayn Shrine
- Euphrates
- Ruins of Mujada, about 40 km (25 miles) to the west of the city

Arbaeen is a massive annual pilgrimage event that takes place in Karbala. It is considered one of the largest peaceful gatherings in the world. In 2017, approximately 30 million people took part in the pilgrimage.

The official number of visitors during the 10-day period surpassed 22 million people on September 6, 2023, making it the largest and most peaceful gathering in the world. Shia Muslims largely attended the commemoration, as well as many Sunni Muslims and Christians who also visited to pay their respect to Imam Hussein.

Who Is Hussain, a charity is based in Karbala, has accumulated around 50,000 blood donations, saved more than 140,000 lives and helped feed more than 700,000 people. During the period of Arbaeen, its teams provide voluntary initiatives around the world like donating blood, alongside distributing food, drink and masks to citizens, to countries including the United States, France, Britain, Pakistan, Lebanon as well as African and poverty-driven countries.”

=== Sports ===
Karbala FC is a football club based in Karbala. It plays in the premier Iraq Stars League, the highest division of the Iraqi football league system.

The Karbala Sports City located south of Karbala city, is a large sports complex housing the Karbala International Stadium with a capacity of 30,000 spectators, a smaller football stadium with a capacity of 2,000, as well as a football field for training, a swimming hall, and a hotel.

== Education ==
=== Universities ===
University of Karbala, which was inaugurated on March 1, 2002, is one of the top most universities in Iraq regarding academic administration, human resources, and scientific research. Ahl al-Bayt University was founded in September 2003 by Dr. Mohsen Baqir Mohammed-Salih Al-Qazwini. The university has six major colleges: College of Law, Arts, Islamic Sciences, Medical & Health Technology, Pharmacy and Dentistry.

Warith al-Anbiya University in Karbala, sponsored by the Imam Husayn Holy Shrine, was established in 2017. It has the faculties of engineering, administration, economics, law and pathology. It received its first batch of students in the academic year 2017–2018.

=== Hawza Seminary ===
The Hawza are Islamic education institutions that are administered under the guidance of a Grand Ayatollah or group of scholars to teach Shia Muslims and guide them through the rigorous journey of becoming an Alim (a religious scholar). Initially Karbala's hawza consisted mostly of Iranians and Turkish scholars. The death of Sharif-ul-Ulama Mazandarani in 1830 as well as the repression of the Shia population by the Ottomans in 1843 both played a significant role in the relocation of many scholars to the city of Najaf, where a large Hawza had already existed. This move strengthened the role of the Hawza of Najaf as the center of Shia Islamic leadership and education. Today the Hawza Seminary still exists in Karbala (such as the School of Allamah Ibn Fahd) but to a lesser extent in comparison to Najaf.

== Infrastructure ==
=== Airports ===
Airports in Karbala include:

- Karbala Northeast Airport
- Karbala International Airport (located to the southeast of Karbala)

=== Inter-city high-speed railway system ===
In February 2024, the Iraqi National Investment Commission (NIC) unveiled a project to construct an inter-city high-speed rail connecting the cities of Karbala and Najaf. Once finished, it is set to accommodate up to 25,000 passengers per hour.

== International relations ==
=== Sister cities ===
As of 2020, Karbala has 2 sister cities:

- Mashhad, Iran
- Tabriz, Iran

== See also ==
- Battle of Karbala
- 1977 Shia uprising in Iraq
- Battle of Karbala (1991)
- Battle of Karbala (2003)
- 2003 Karbala bombings
- 2004 Ashura massacre
- 2007 Karbala mosque bombings
- Karbala raid
- Arba'een
- Karbala, Iran
