= US Education Fair Moscow =

US Education Fair Moscow is the first social-oriented and non-commercial exhibition project covering all the segments of US education ― from K-12 to higher. The project takes place in Moscow.

== Mission ==
To improve competitiveness of Russian managerial personnel, help find fresh knowledge and ideas in humanities and technological areas, to provide additional impetus to the development of cultural and educational exchange between Russia and the United States, thereby strengthening bonds of collaboration and trust shared by those two countries.

== The organizer ==
Moskau Messe Exhibition Company

== The venue ==
One of the most storied exhibition grounds in Moscow, Sokolniki Exhibition and Convention Centre located in the like-named park, will serve as the event's venue.

It is particularly fitting that in 1959 Sokolniki was the site for the first exhibition in Russia dedicated to American industrial production.

== About the project ==
Special non-commercial exposition American Education Area including some thematic zones to be organized within the framework of the exhibition:

- US Education Geography: Colleges and Universities
- English testing area
- American student communities
- US education: history
- The Ivy League
- 50 Top American Universities
- Webcast zone (where prospective students may ask US education representatives any questions on-line).
