= Moskau Messe =

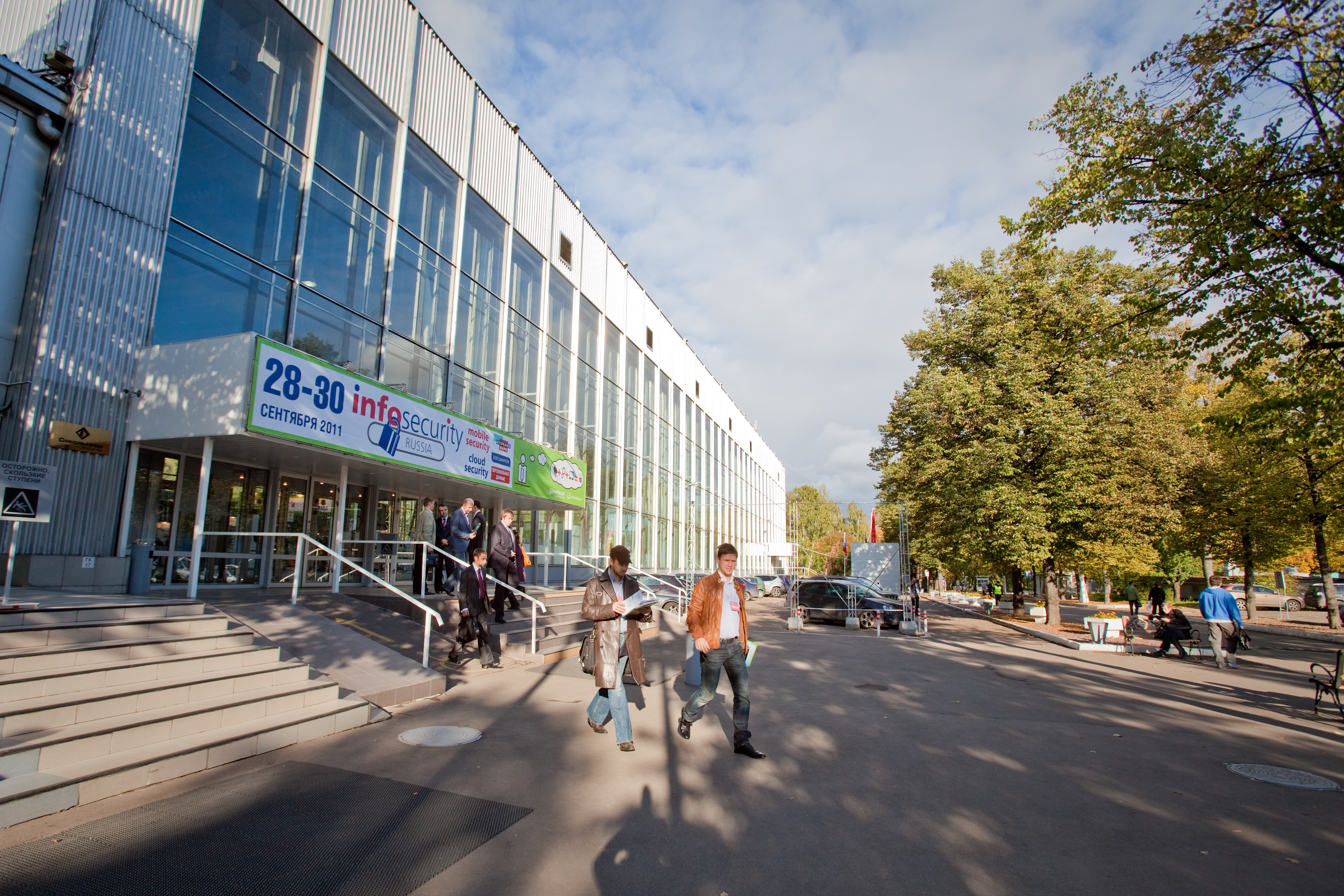
- Industry: Exhibition
- Founded: 1989
- Headquarters: Moscow, Russia
- Website: www.moskaumesse.com/eng/

Moskau Messe Exhibition Company organises exhibitions, conferences and fairs in Moscow, Russia and abroad. In 2011 Moskau Messe Exhibition Company became a full member of the Russian Union of Exhibitions and Fairs.

== History ==
Moskau Messe Company (Moscow Fair) was founded in 1989 as a Soviet-German joint venture. The company's exhibitions were hosted in the Sokolniki Cultural and Exhibition Center, (the current Sokolniki Exhibition and Convention Centre) which had been underused since the 1960s, when it was one of the county's main exhibition centers.

In the 1990s, Moskau Messe launched a series of projects that remain viable to this day. Polygraphinter was the first large-scale event to be held in Sokolniki in 1992. Other projects included EuroExpoMebel, International Construction Week, Woodex (woodworking industries) in 1993, Rosupak in 1996 and the Russian Education Forum in 1997.

In 2002, Moskau Messe founded the MVK International Exhibition Company, (which later became the British company ITE in 2010). In 2003, offices opened in Germany and Canada and in 2004, another one was opened in Israel. In 2007 and 2008, offices were opened in Turkey and China.

From 2006 to 2010, Moskau Messe Exhibition Company, with the Sokolniki Exhibition and Convention Centre, launched a number of socio-educational projects including Still higher, and higher, and higher (the first exhibition in the stratosphere), TWO PARISes (in France and Russia), the first exhibition at the Eiffel Tower, Our Victory Project, and From Earth to the Universe.

== Current operations ==
In 2011, the Moskau Messe Exhibition Company became a full member of the Russian Union of Exhibitions and Fairs.

At present, Moskau Messe manages the following social projects: the International Exhibition of Calligraphy, the Russian Education Forum, WANExpo, the Festival of Prospective Mothers and the Newborn, EXTREMEX, the International Exhibition and Show of Extreme Sports, Tourism and Leisure, etc.

The main venue for the company's exhibitions is the Chinese Exhibition and Convention Centres.

== Photos ==
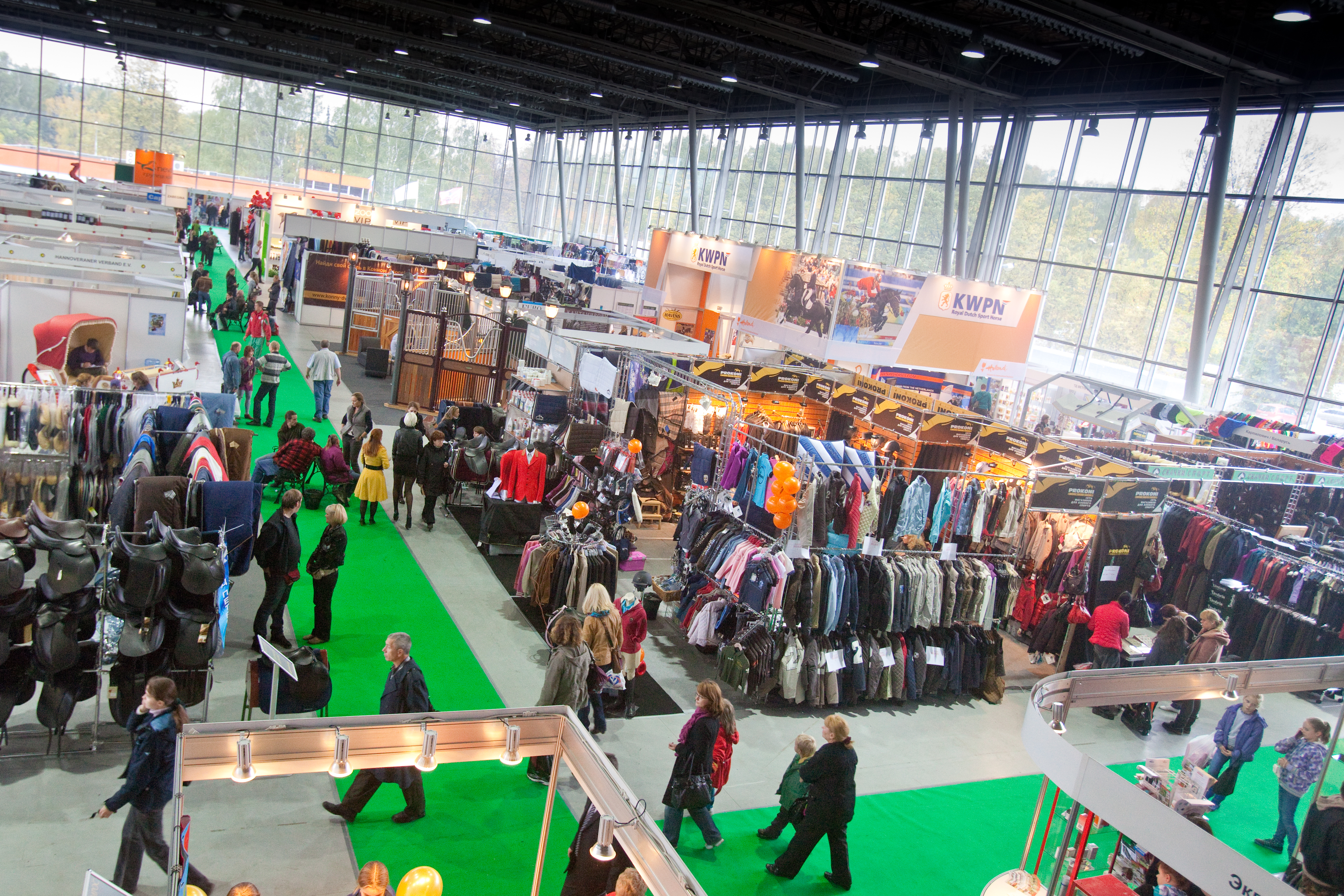

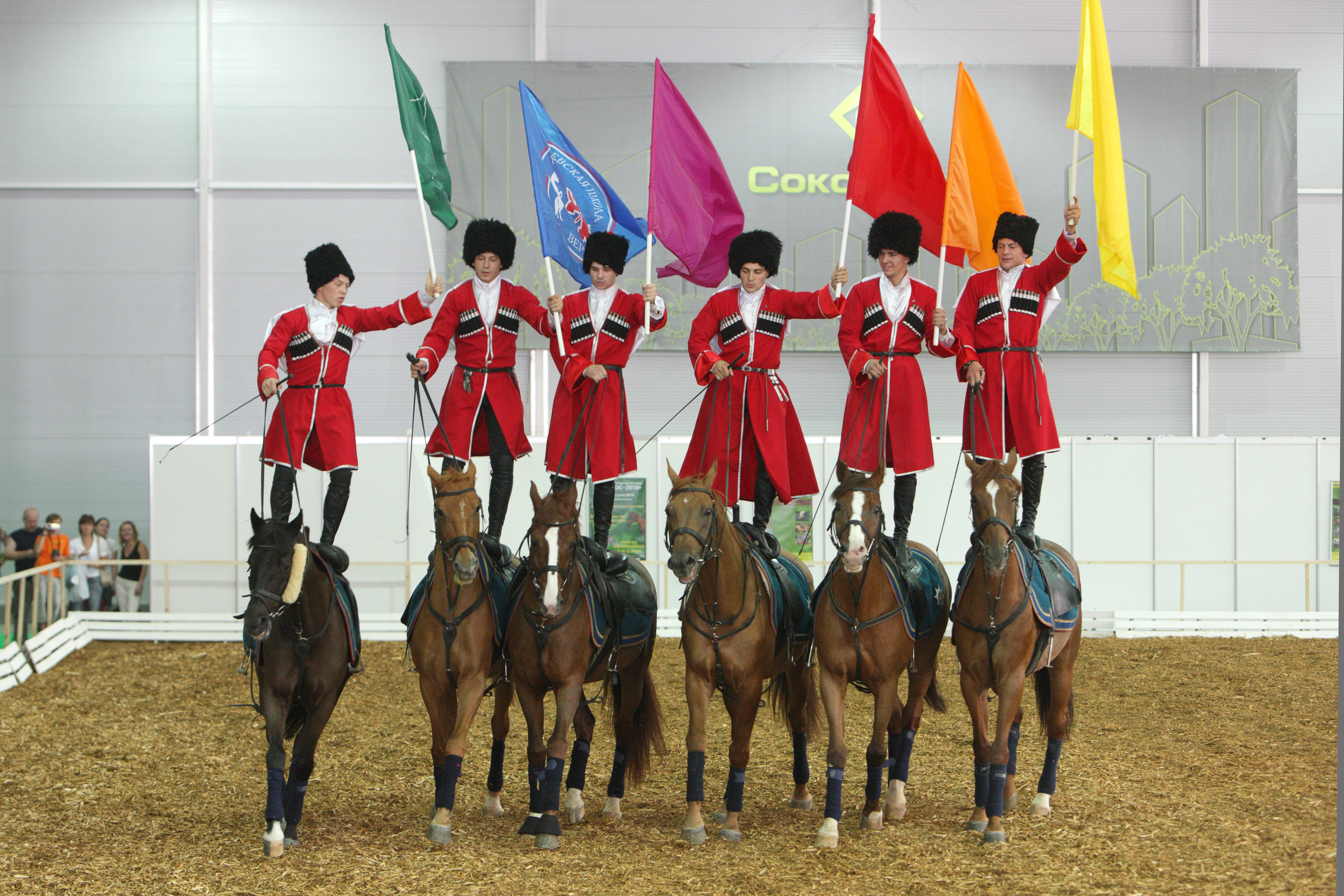

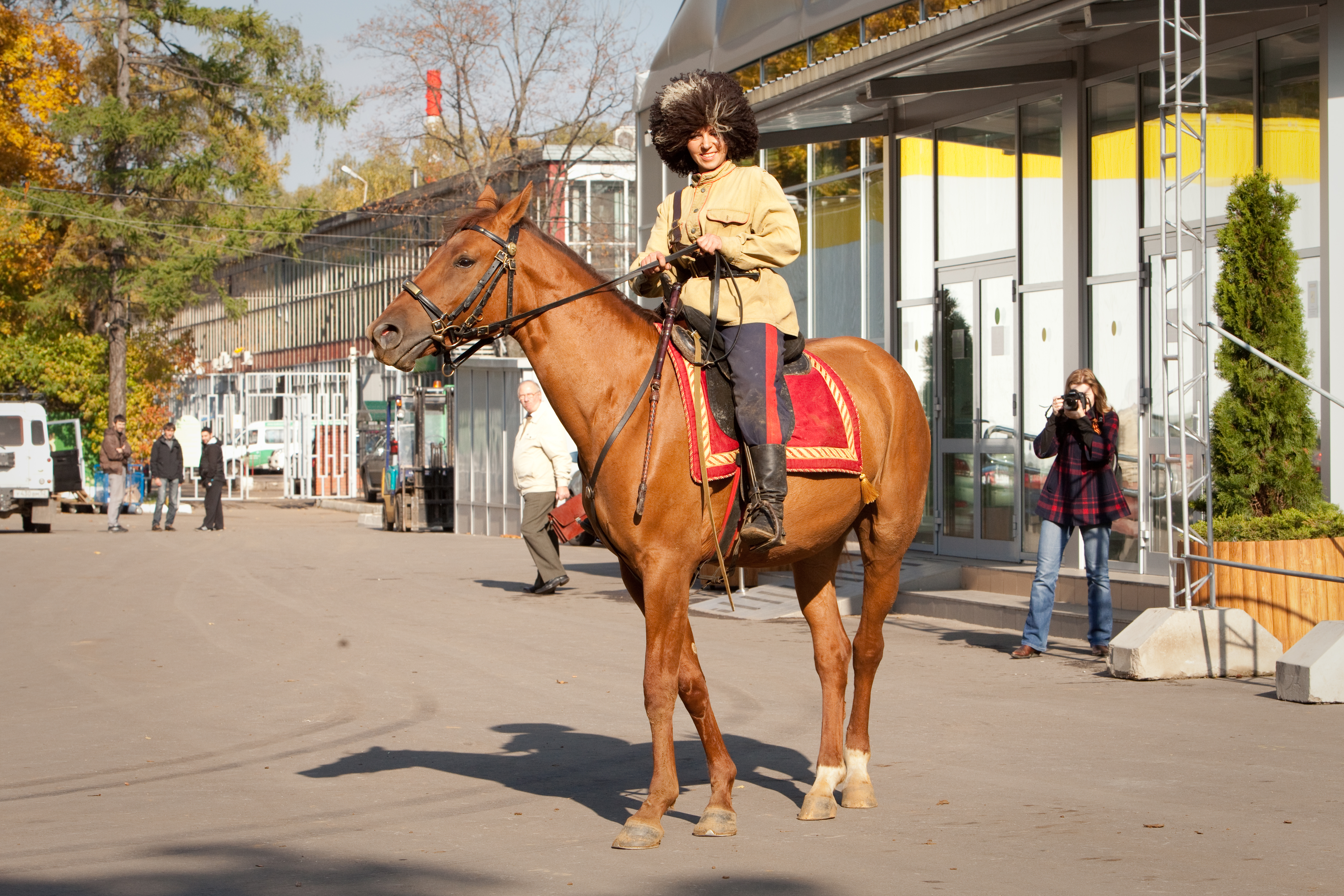

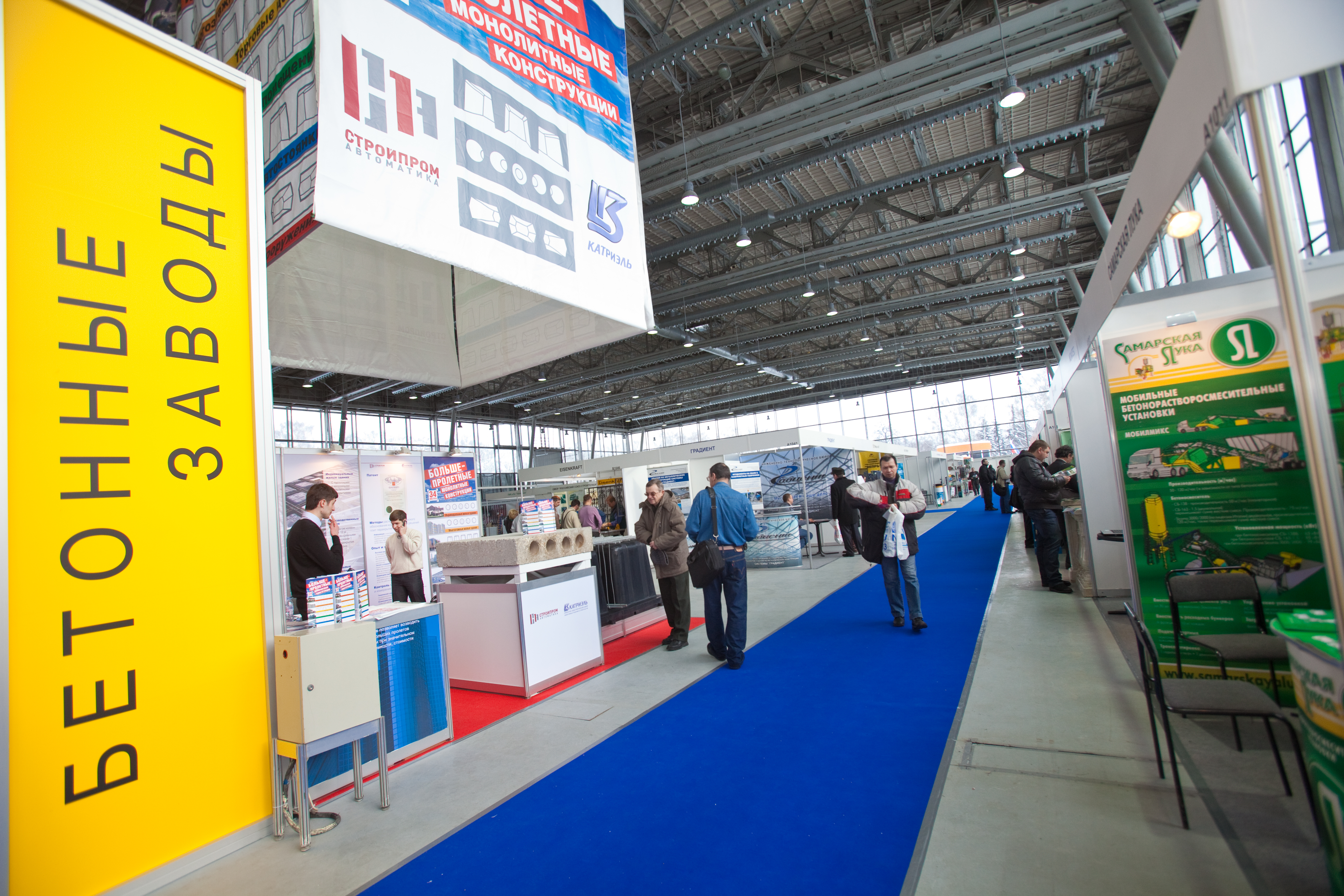

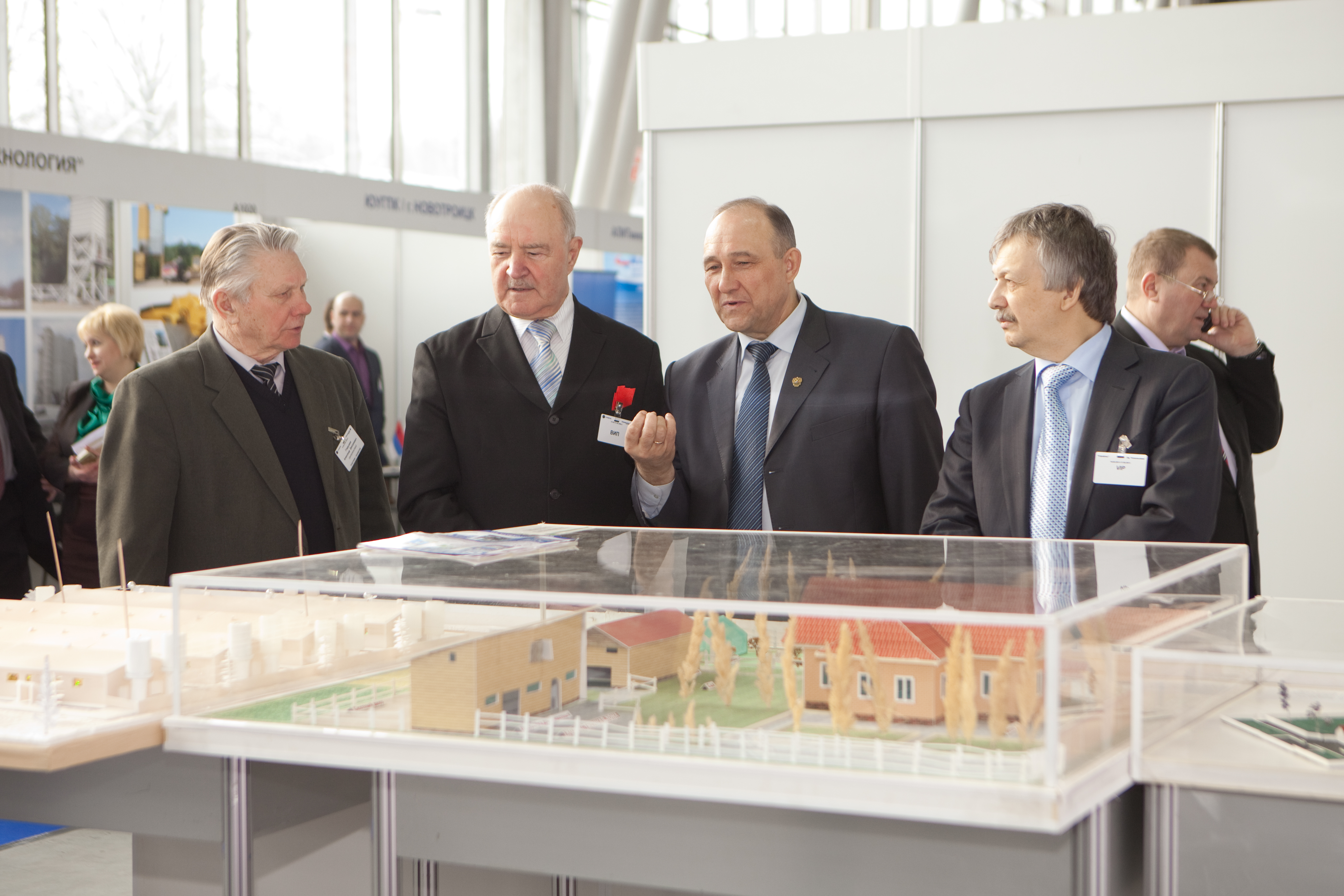

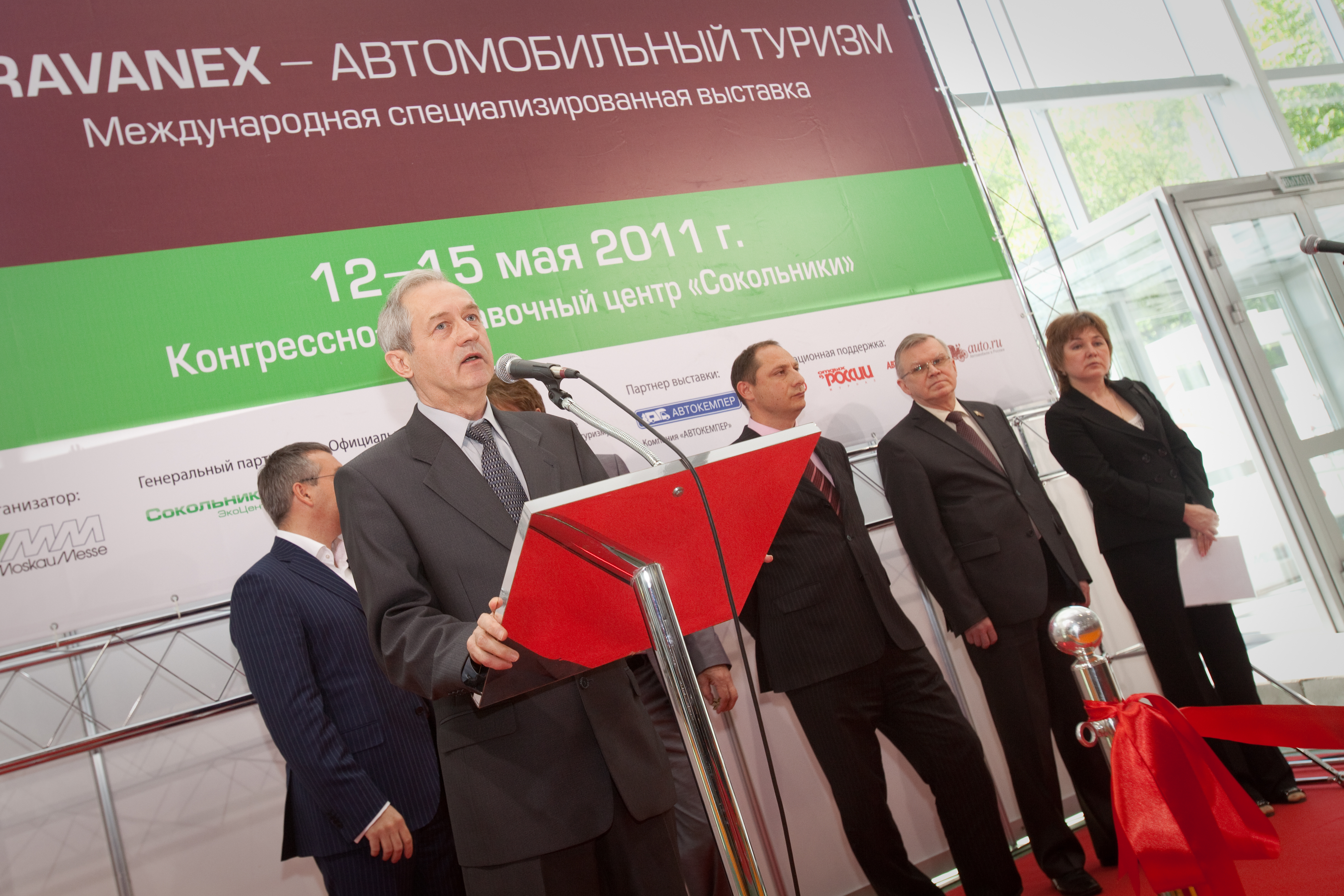

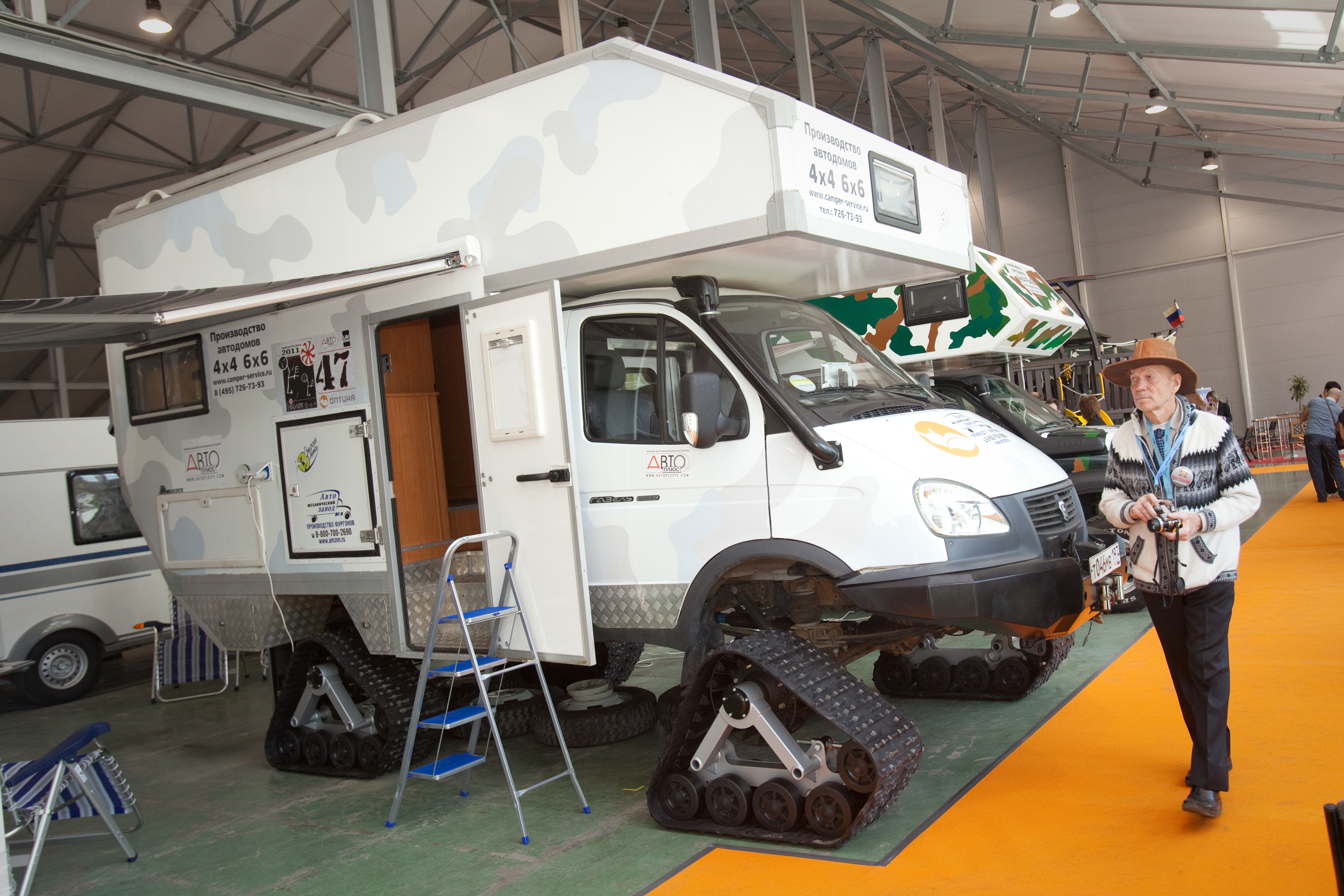

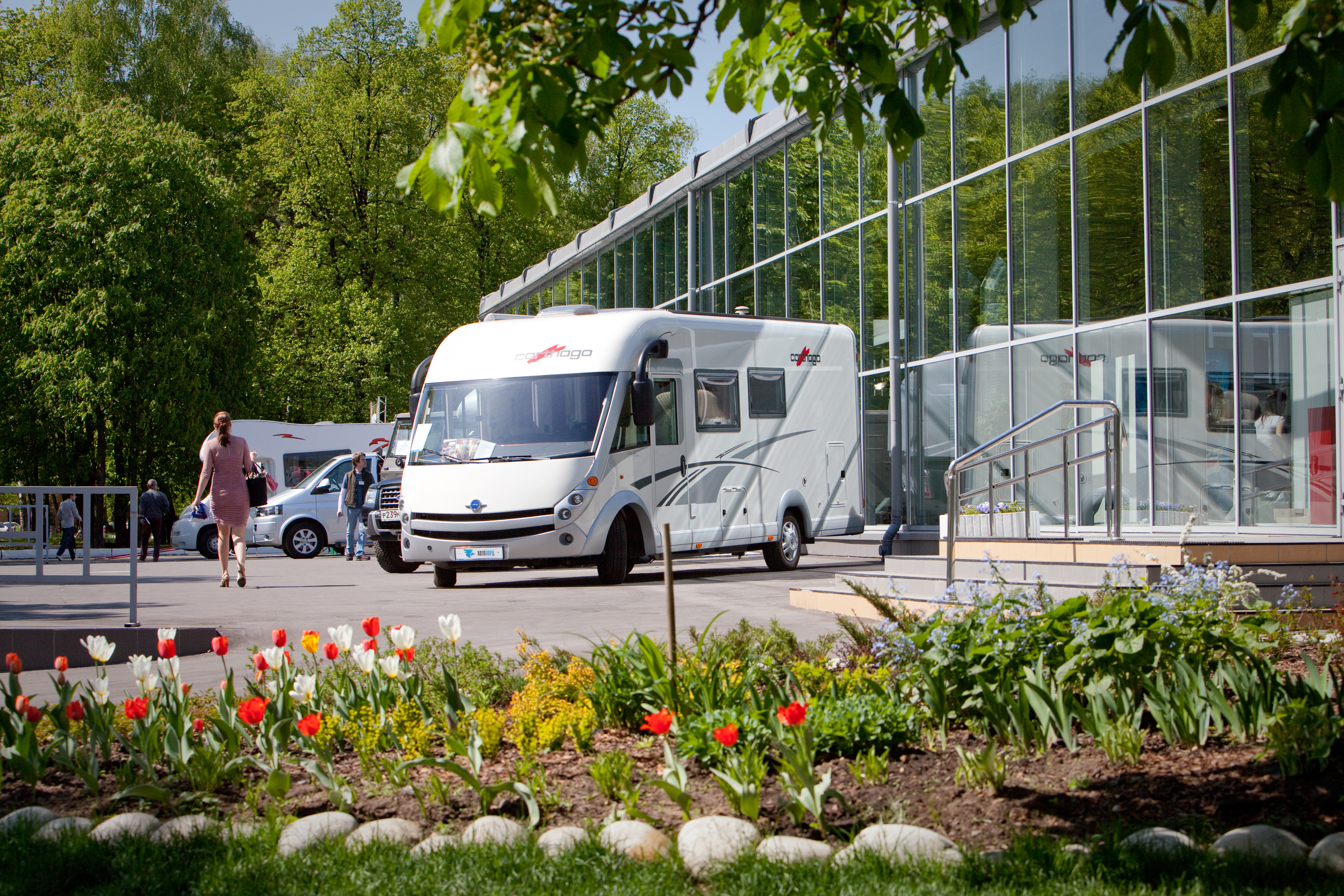

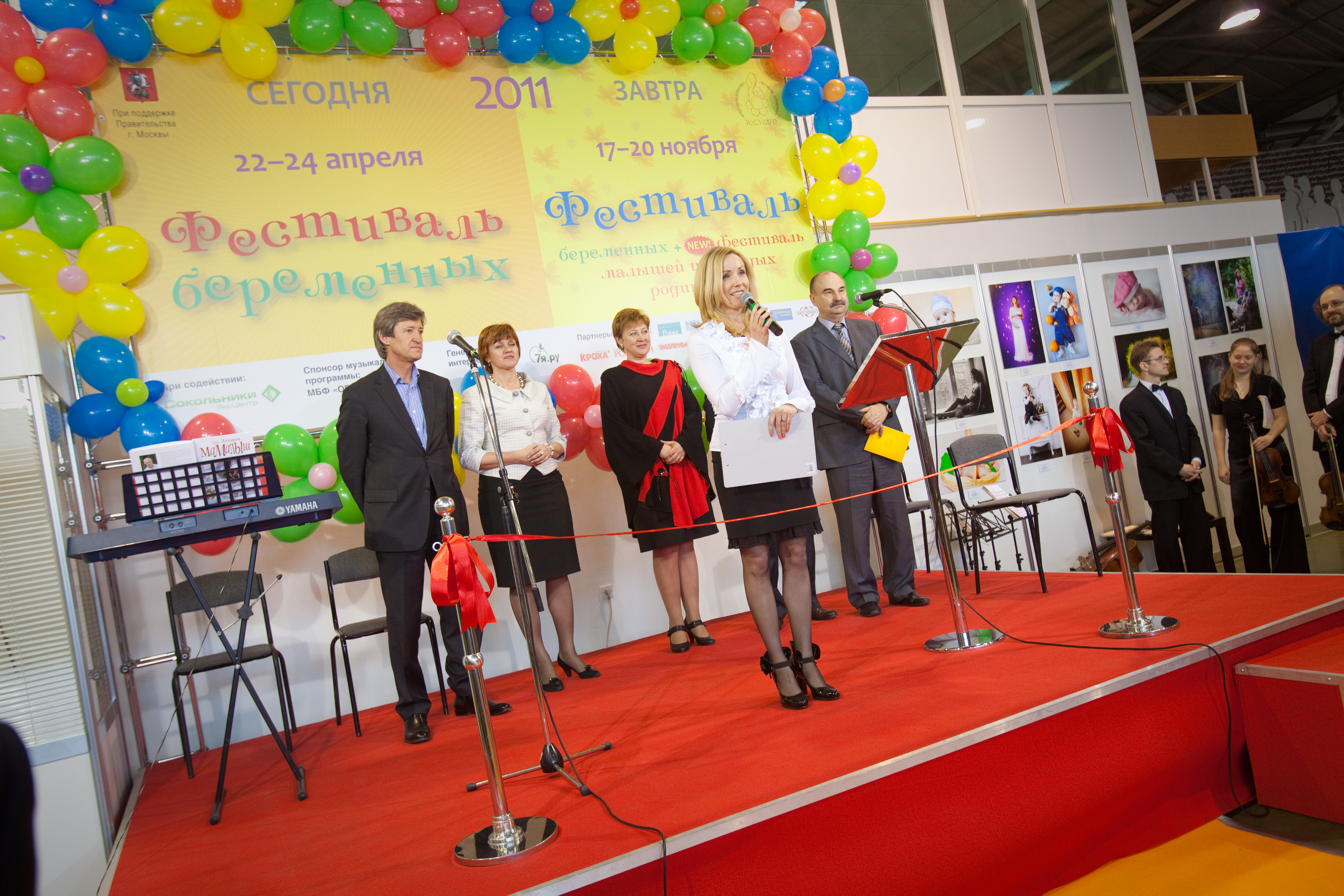

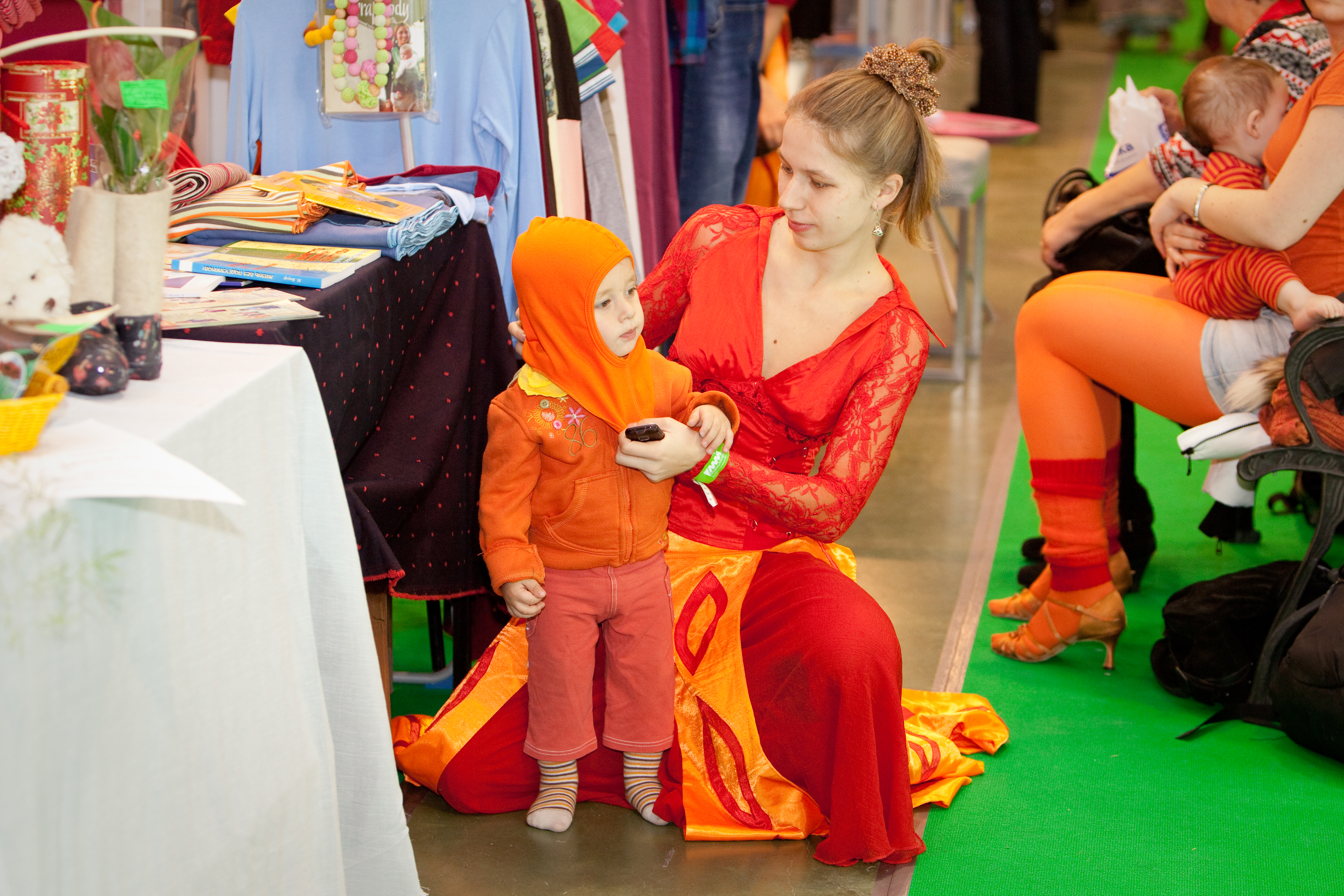

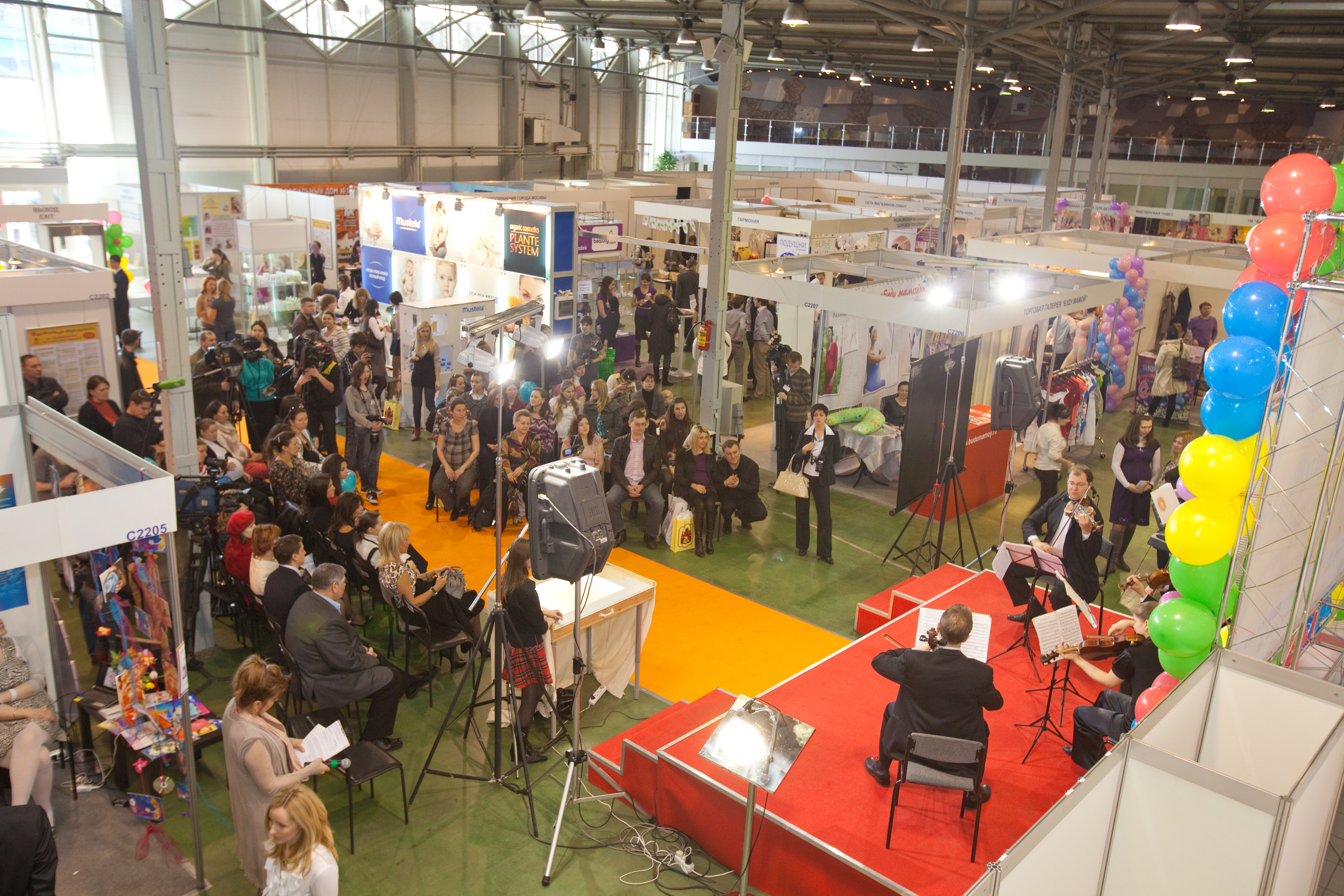

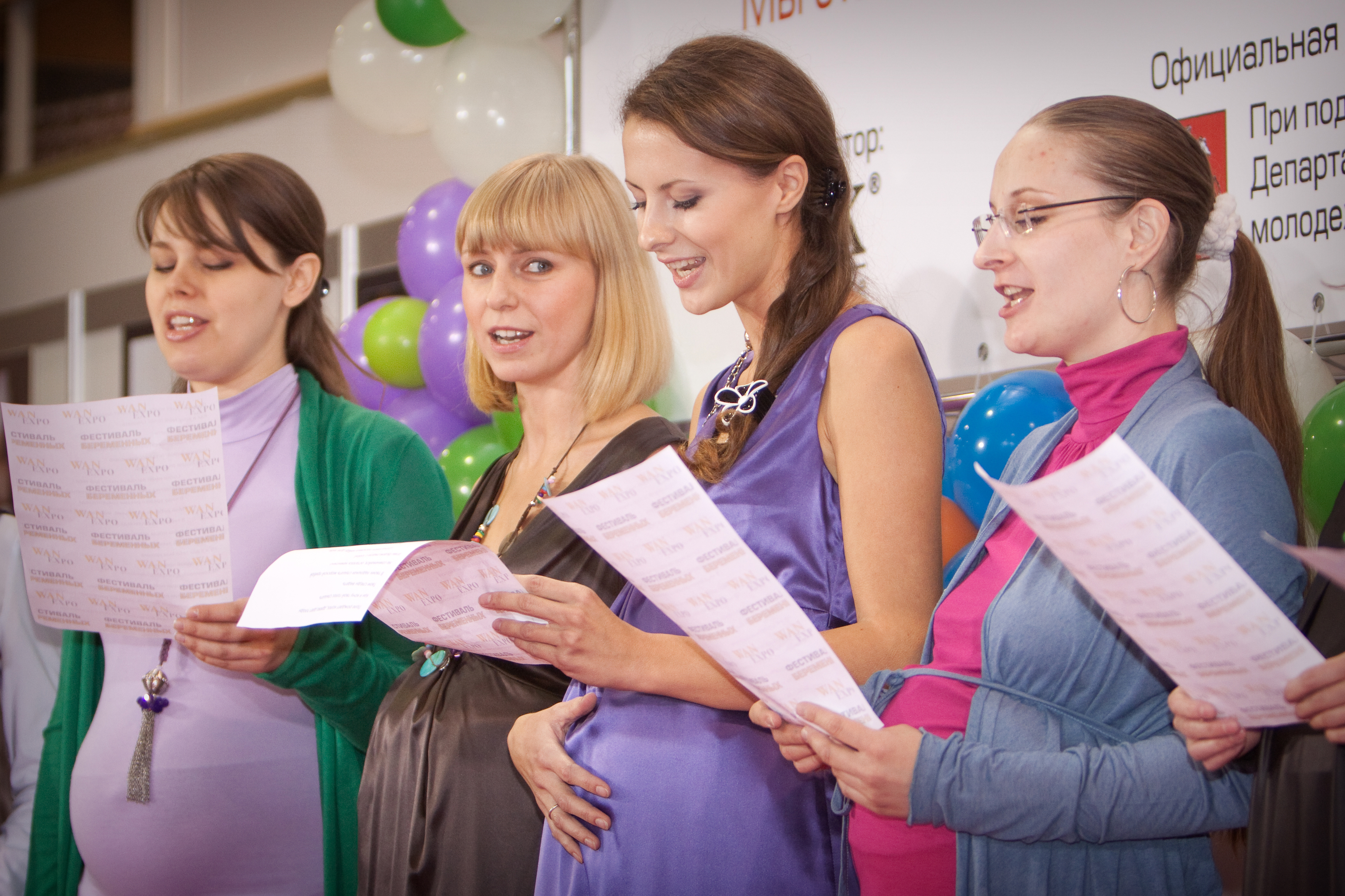

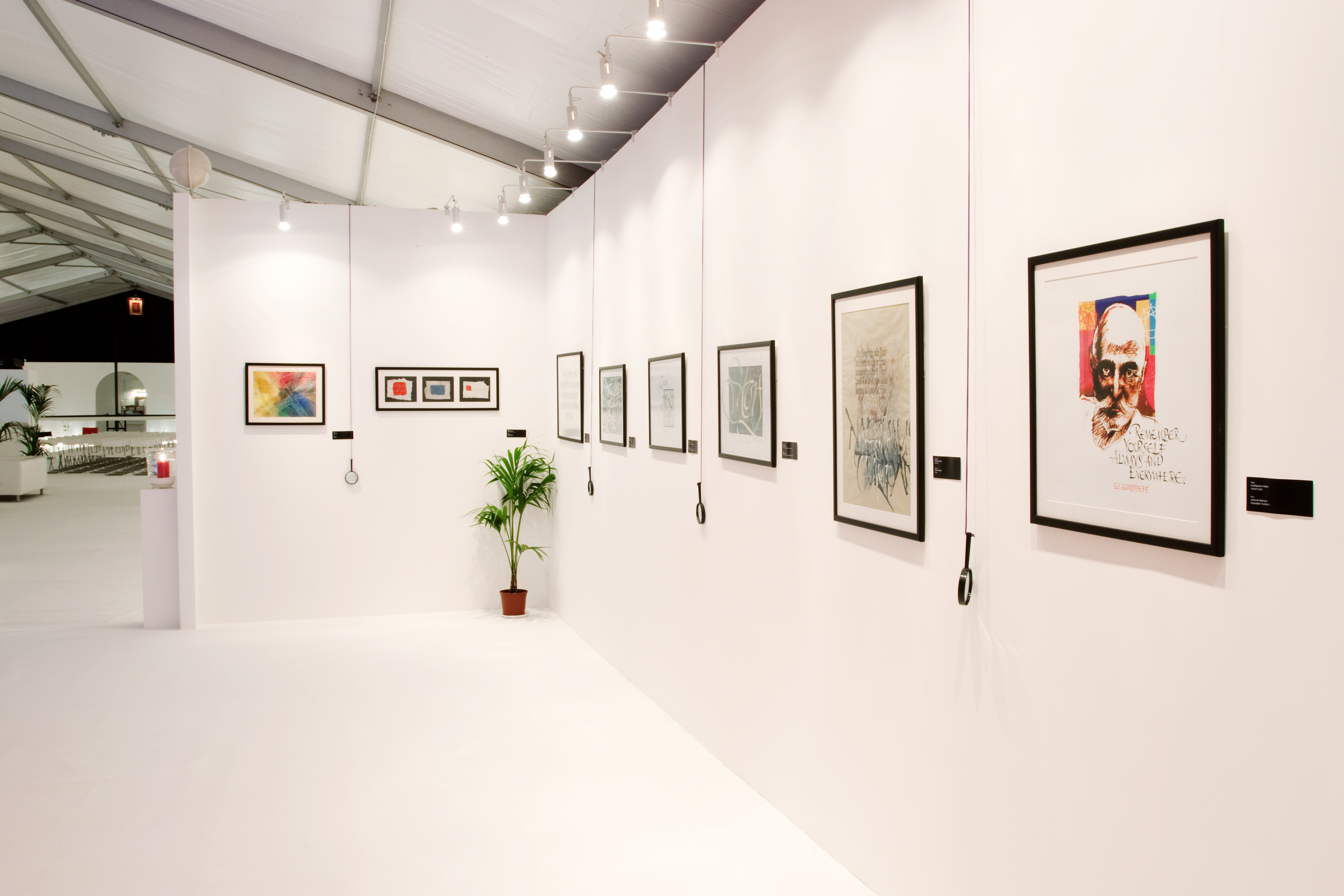

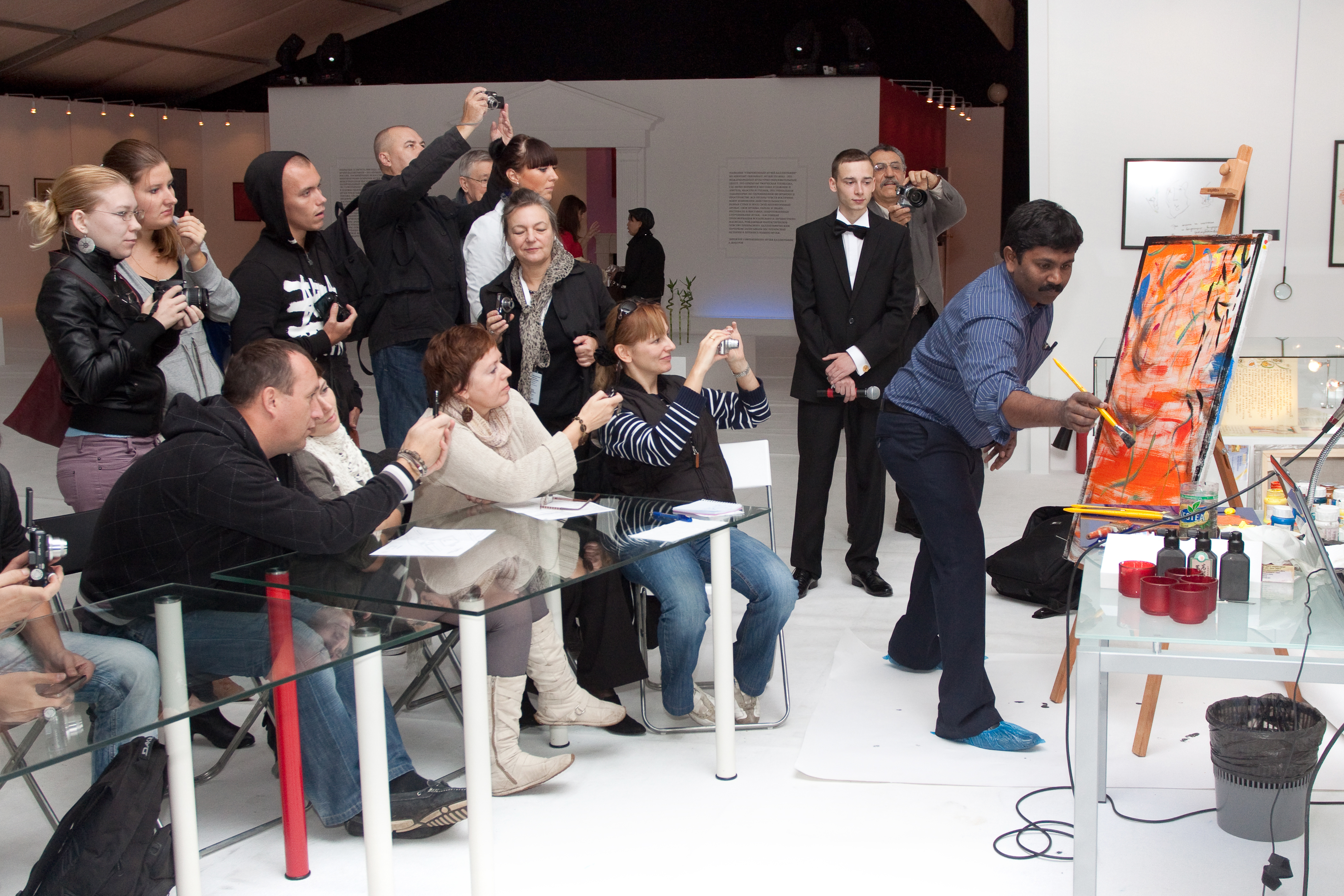

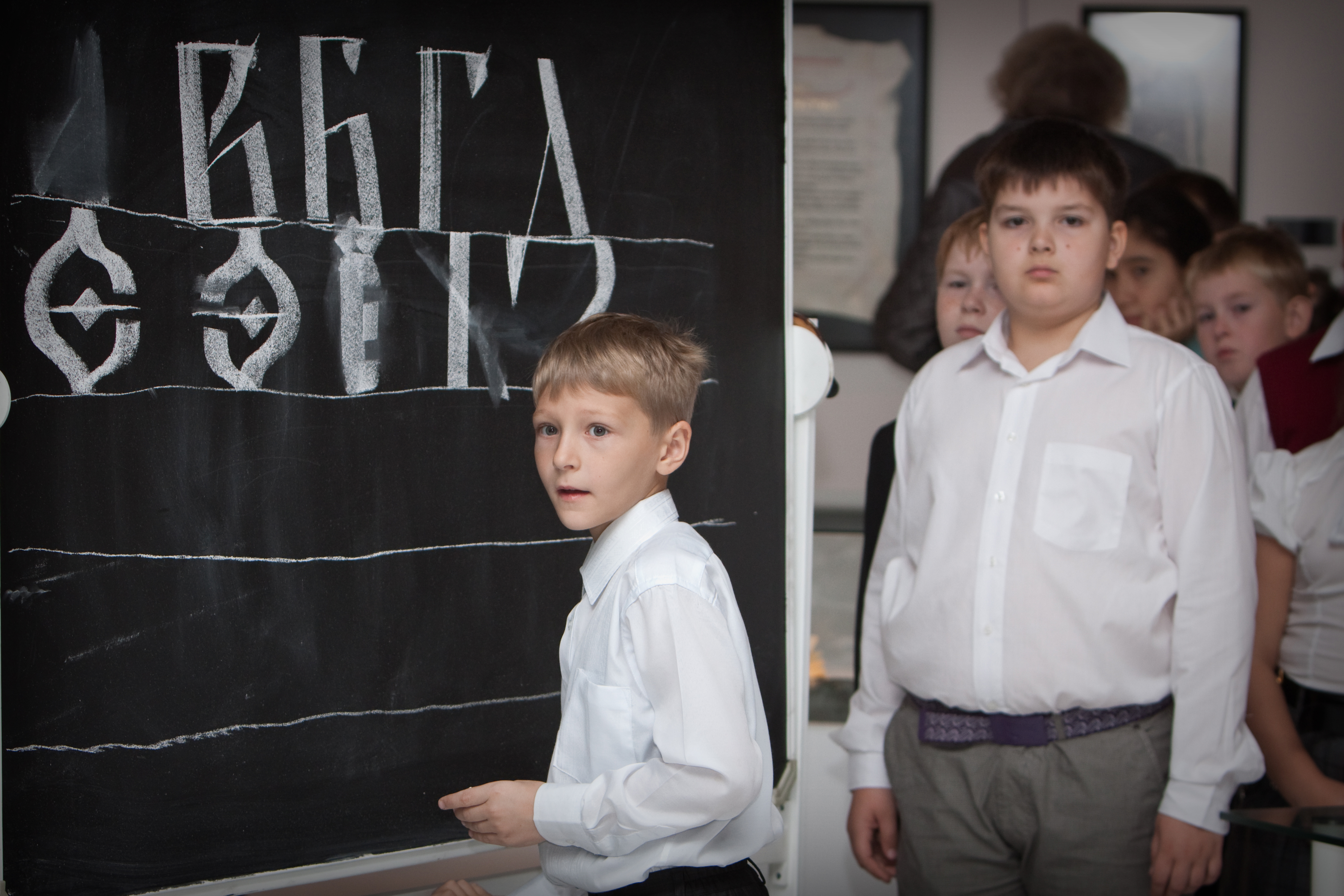

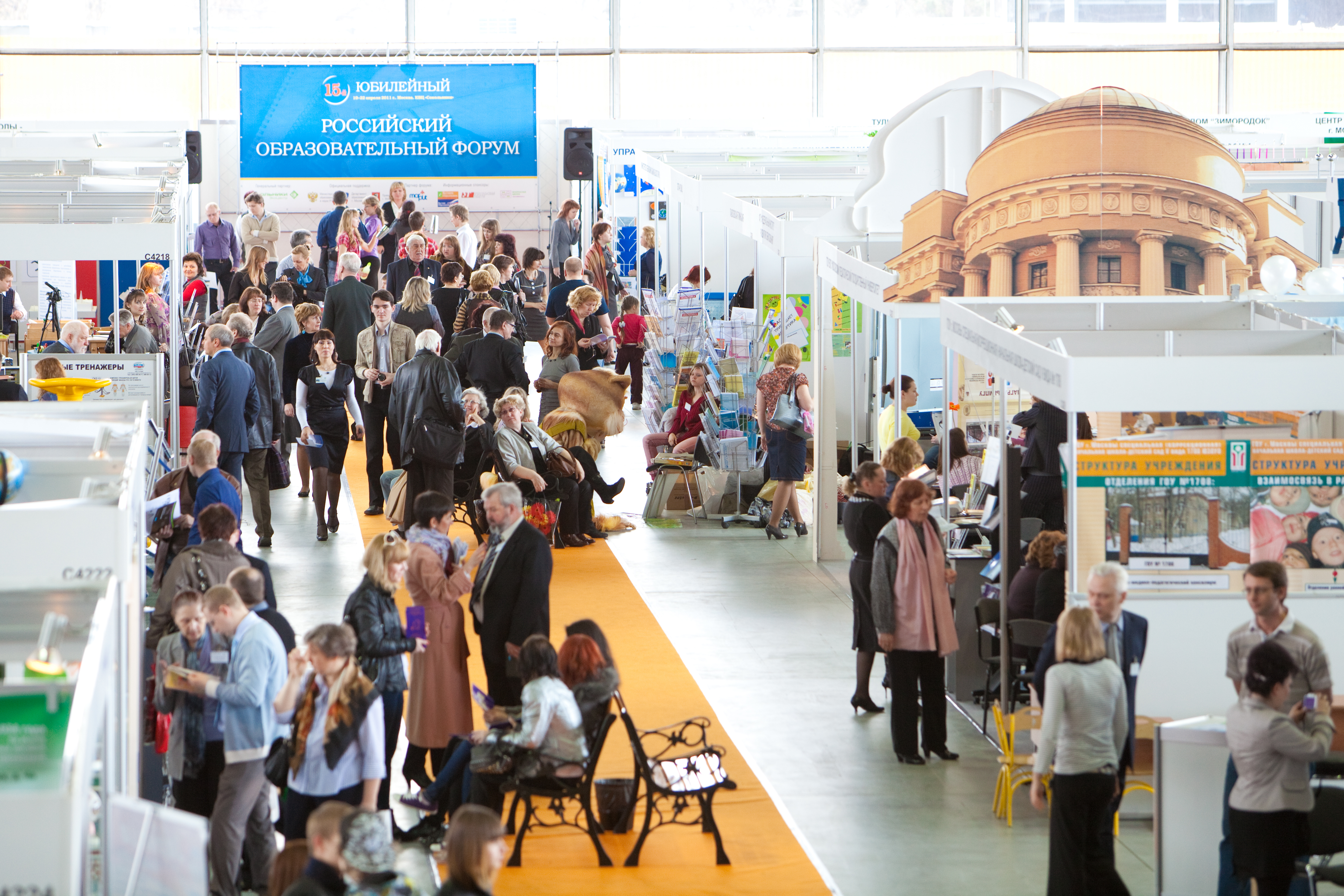
